= National Register of Historic Places listings in Lawrence County, South Dakota =

Location of Lawrence County in South Dakota

This is a list of the National Register of Historic Places listings in Lawrence County, South Dakota.

This is intended to be a complete list of the properties and districts on the National Register of Historic Places in Lawrence County, South Dakota, United States. The locations of National Register properties and districts for which the latitude and longitude coordinates are included below, may be seen in a map.

There are 57 properties and districts listed on the National Register in the county, including 2 National Historic Landmarks.

This National Park Service list is complete through NPS recent listings posted May 1, 2026.

== Current listings ==
	Name on the Register	Image	Date listed	Location	City or town	Description
1	Oliver N. Ainsworth House	Oliver N. Ainsworth House	October 25, 1990 (#90001646)	340 Kansas; 44°29′35″N 103°51′18″W	Spearfish	part of the Architecture of Finnish Settlement Thematic Resource (TR)
2	Rasmus and Elemine Anderson Homestead Ranch		January 16, 2015 (#14001179)	11753 Anderson Rd. 44°30′39″N 103°41′45″W	St. Onge vicinity	
3	Baker Bungalow	Baker Bungalow	October 24, 1996 (#96001231)	740 8th St. 44°29′29″N 103°51′19″W	Spearfish	
4	Henry Buskala Ranch		November 13, 1985 (#85003488)	FDR 206; 44°12′27″N 103°48′11″W	Dumont	part of the Architecture of Finnish Settlement TR
5	Fayette Cook House	Fayette Cook House	July 13, 1988 (#88000573)	840 8th Ave. 44°29′33″N 103°51′20″W	Spearfish	
6	James A. Corbin House	James A. Corbin House	October 25, 1990 (#90001651)	345 Main St. 44°29′11″N 103°51′28″W	Spearfish	
7	Henry Court House	Henry Court House	October 25, 1990 (#90001652)	329 Main St. 44°29′10″N 103°51′28″W	Spearfish	
8	Dakota Tin and Gold Mine	Dakota Tin and Gold Mine	June 8, 2005 (#05000592)	20896 Fillmore Mine Ln. 44°22′23″N 104°02′02″W	Spearfish	
9	Deadwood Historic District	Deadwood Historic District	October 15, 1966 (#66000716)	Bounded by the city limits 44°22′19″N 103°44′00″W	Deadwood	
10	Eleazer C. and Gwinnie Dickey House	Eleazer C. and Gwinnie Dickey House	July 13, 1989 (#89000824)	735 8th St. 44°29′28″N 103°51′21″W	Spearfish	
11	Walter Dickey House	Walter Dickey House	May 16, 1988 (#88000568)	815 State St. 44°29′31″N 103°51′17″W	Spearfish	
12	William D. Driskill House	William D. Driskill House	July 13, 1989 (#89000822)	335 Canyon St. 44°29′10″N 103°51′39″W	Spearfish	
13	Episcopal Church of All Angels	Episcopal Church of All Angels	April 22, 1976 (#76001743)	129 W. Michigan; 44°29′38″N 103°51′38″W	Spearfish	
14	Frawley Historic Ranch	Frawley Historic Ranch	December 31, 1974 (#74001893)	6 miles (9.7 km) east of Spearfish on U.S. Route 14; 44°28′30″N 103°42′38″W	Spearfish	
15	Galena School		November 30, 1999 (#99001435)	Block 13, Lots 1-5 Bryan Placer No. 913; 44°19′42″N 103°38′47″W	Galena	part of the Schools in South Dakota Multiple Property Submission (MPS)
16	Halloran-Matthews-Brady House	Halloran-Matthews-Brady House	December 12, 1976 (#76001744)	214 E. Jackson St. 44°29′30″N 103°51′26″W	Spearfish	
17	Solomon and Martha Hann Homestead		March 14, 2019 (#100003444)	21732 Hann Pl. 44°15′07″N 103°39′44″W	Nemo vicinity	
18	Hardy Guard Station		October 18, 2011 (#11000746)	22107 US 85; 44°11′54″N 104°02′14″W	Lead	
19	Jerome and Jonetta Harvey Homestead Cabin		September 12, 2008 (#08000885)	Township 3, Range 2, Track A of Homestead Entry Survey 71; 44°11′59″N 103°49′10″W	Lead	
20	Arthur Hewes House	Arthur Hewes House	October 25, 1990 (#90001650)	811 St. Joe; 44°29′29″N 103°52′07″W	Spearfish	
21	John Hill Ranch-Keltomaki		November 13, 1985 (#85003489)	Northeast of Brownsville; 44°17′11″N 103°39′11″W	Brownsville	part of the Architecture of Finnish Settlement TR
22	Homestake Mining Company Hydroelectric Plant No. 2	Homestake Mining Company Hydroelectric Plant No. 2	February 10, 2023 (#100008619)	US 14A; 44°23′51″N 103°53′53″W	Spearfish vicinity	
23	Homestake Workers House	Homestake Workers House	November 1, 1991 (#91001620)	830 State St. 44°29′32″N 103°51′15″W	Spearfish	
24	Jackson Boulevard Historic District	Jackson Boulevard Historic District	March 11, 2019 (#100003440)	Several blks. around E. Jackson Blvd., generally bounded by N. 7th, N. 10th, E. Kansas & E. Hudson Sts. 44°29′30″N 103°51′20″W	Spearfish	
25	Henry Keets House	Henry Keets House	July 13, 1988 (#88000572)	344 E. Illinois; 44°29′27″N 103°51′16″W	Spearfish	
26	Webb S. Knight House	Webb S. Knight House	July 13, 1989 (#89000823)	514 7th St. 44°29′19″N 103°51′22″W	Spearfish	
27	Kroll Meat Market and Slaughterhouse	Kroll Meat Market and Slaughterhouse	May 20, 1988 (#88000576)	Spearfish city park 44°29′06″N 103°51′38″W	Spearfish	
28	Lead Historic District	Lead Historic District	December 31, 1974 (#74001892)	Roughly bounded by the city limits 44°21′06″N 103°45′45″W	Lead	
29	William Ernest Lown House	William Ernest Lown House	May 28, 1976 (#76001745)	745 5th St. 44°29′26″N 103°51′38″W	Spearfish	
30	The Mail Building	The Mail Building	May 16, 1988 (#88000574)	731 Main St. 44°29′26″N 103°51′32″W	Spearfish	
31	McLaughlin Ranch Barn		February 14, 2002 (#02000025)	410 N. Rainbow Rd. 44°28′46″N 103°46′06″W	Spearfish	
32	Mount Theodore Roosevelt Monument	Mount Theodore Roosevelt Monument	December 22, 2005 (#05001457)	Black Hills National Forest; 44°23′53″N 103°45′33″W	Deadwood	
33	Nemo School House	Nemo School House	July 17, 1996 (#96000747)	12743 Nemo Rd. 44°11′35″N 103°30′18″W	Nemo	
34	Old Finnish Lutheran Church	Old Finnish Lutheran Church	November 13, 1985 (#85003487)	Sinking Gardens, E. Main St. 44°21′09″N 103°45′50″W	Lead	part of the Architecture of Finnish Settlement TR
35	Patterson Homestead		November 7, 2022 (#100008361)	12445 Misty Meadows Rd. 44°11′32″N 103°33′48″W	Nemo vicinity	
36	Thomas Quillian House	Thomas Quillian House	November 1, 1991 (#91001618)	W. Center St. 44°32′49″N 103°43′23″W	Saint Onge	
37	Old Redwater Bridge		December 9, 1993 (#93001300)	Local road over the Redwater River; 44°35′24″N 103°51′22″W	Spearfish	part of the Historic Bridges in South Dakota MPS
38	Pearson Cabin		August 14, 2012 (#12000514)	0.33 miles (0.53 km) southeast of the junction of Radio Rd. & US 14; 44°23′00″N 103°39′43″W	Deadwood vicinity	
39	Almira Riley House	Almira Riley House	July 13, 1989 (#89000825)	938 Ames; 44°29′35″N 103°52′04″W	Spearfish	
40	St. Lawrence O'Toole Catholic Church	St. Lawrence O'Toole Catholic Church	February 5, 2003 (#02001764)	618 Main; 44°22′10″N 103°45′58″W	Central City	
41	St. Onge Schoolhouse	St. Onge Schoolhouse	May 7, 1980 (#80003727)	Off Highway 24; 44°32′47″N 103°43′26″W	Saint Onge	
42	Saint Onge State Bank	Saint Onge State Bank	October 26, 2005 (#05001190)	214 Center St. 44°32′56″N 103°43′14″W	Saint Onge	The image is not the bank. The Woodmen Hall and the bank were in the same building. It was nominated twice under each name.
43	Spearfish City Hall	Spearfish City Hall	October 25, 1990 (#90001649)	722 Main St. 44°29′27″N 103°51′31″W	Spearfish	
44	Spearfish Filling Station	Spearfish Filling Station	May 16, 1988 (#88000567)	706 Main St. 44°29′25″N 103°51′30″W	Spearfish	
45	Spearfish Fisheries Center	Spearfish Fisheries Center	May 19, 1978 (#78003438)	South of Spearfish off U.S. Route 14; 44°28′52″N 103°51′36″W	Spearfish	
46	Spearfish Historic Commercial District	Spearfish Historic Commercial District	June 5, 1975 (#75001718)	544, 545, 603-645 Main St., 114-136 W. Illinois St., and 701-703 5th St. 44°29′22″N 103°51′32″W	Spearfish	Boundary decrease approved November 2, 2017.
47	Spearfish Rest Stop Tipi	Spearfish Rest Stop Tipi	January 20, 2015 (#14001180)	Mi. 1, I-90; 44°32′42″N 104°02′03″W	Spearfish vicinity	
48	Old Spearfish Post Office	Old Spearfish Post Office	February 12, 1999 (#99000205)	526 Main St. 44°29′19″N 103°51′30″W	Spearfish	part of the Federal Relief Construction in South Dakota MPS
49	Tomahawk Lake Country Club	Tomahawk Lake Country Club	October 26, 2005 (#05001191)	U.S. Route 385; 44°17′27″N 103°41′07″W	Deadwood	
50	Toomey House	Toomey House	November 7, 1997 (#97001390)	1011 Main St. 44°29′36″N 103°51′35″W	Spearfish	
51	Otto L. Uhlig House	Otto L. Uhlig House	July 13, 1989 (#89000827)	230 Jackson; 44°29′30″N 103°51′23″W	Spearfish	
52	Walsh Barn		May 30, 2003 (#03000500)	0.5 miles (0.80 km) west of the junction of Upper Redwater Rd. and 104th Ave. 44°34′47″N 103°59′19″W	Spearfish	
53	Walton Ranch	Walton Ranch	May 30, 2005 (#05000036)	221 Upper Valley Rd. 44°30′38″N 103°52′50″W	Spearfish	
54	Whitewood Historic District		June 8, 2007 (#07000529)	1005-1021 Meade St. 44°27′46″N 103°38′23″W	Whitewood	
55	Mary Whitney House	Mary Whitney House	October 25, 1990 (#90001647)	704 8th St. 44°29′27″N 103°51′19″W	Spearfish	Demolished in 2022.
56	John Wolzmuth House	John Wolzmuth House	July 13, 1988 (#88000562)	814 8th Ave. 44°29′31″N 103°51′20″W	Spearfish	
57	Woodmen Hall	Woodmen Hall	November 14, 1991 (#91001619)	Junction of Center and 2nd Sts. 44°32′49″N 103°43′12″W	Saint Onge	

== Former listings ==
	Name on the Register	Image	Date listed	Date removed	Location	City or town	Description
1	Robert H. Evans House		November 1, 1991 (#91001621)	February 25, 2009	258 Evans Ln. 44°30′25″N 103°52′06″W	Spearfish	Destroyed by fire.
2	Selbie Building		November 6, 1986 (#86003013)	November 9, 2001	1101 Meade	Whitewood	Demolished in April, 1992.
3	James Sunderland House		October 25, 1990 (#90001648)	June 1, 2006	711 Canyon	Spearfish	Removed due to significant alterations.
4	Benjamin F. Walters House		July 13, 1989 (#89000826)	March 27, 1997	740 Seventh St. 44°29′26″N 103°51′27″W	Spearfish	Demolished in January, 1997.

== See also ==
- List of National Historic Landmarks in South Dakota
- National Register of Historic Places listings in South Dakota
