= List of highest communities in the United States =

Cities in the United States above 3,000 feet (914 m) in elevation

This is a list of cities in the United States by elevation. To be included on the list, a place needs to be an incorporated municipality (i.e. a city, town, or village) and it needs to be at an elevation of 3,000 feet (914 m) or higher. In the United States, settlements above 3,000 feet are found primarily on the High Plains, in the Rocky Mountains, and in Western North Carolina. However, since many from the aforementioned locations are not presently listed, this list should not be seen as exhaustive.

== Cities and towns above 10,000 feet (3,000 m) ==
| State | City | Elevation | Population | Average Yearly Temp |
|---|---|---|---|---|
| Colorado | Alma | 10,361 ft (3,158 m) | 313 | 32.4 °F (0.2 °C) |
| Colorado | Montezuma | 10,312 ft (3,143 m) | 74 | 37.5 °F (3.1 °C) |
| Colorado | Leadville | 10,151 ft (3,094 m) | 2,868 | 35.1 °F (1.7 °C) |
| Colorado | Blue River | 10,020 ft (3,054 m) | 921 | No Data |

Note: Alma, Colorado is the highest when considering only areas with permanent residents. Using administrative boundaries as a measure, not settled areas, in 2006 Winter Park, Colorado became the highest incorporated town due to its annexation of a ski area.

== Cities and towns above 9,000 feet (2,700 m) ==
| State | City | Elevation | Population | Average Yearly Temp |
|---|---|---|---|---|
| Colorado | Fairplay | 9,953 ft (3,034 m) | 787 | 35.0 °F (1.7 °C) |
| Utah | Brian Head | 9,800 ft (2,987 m) | 83 | 35.6 °F (2.0 °C) |
| Colorado | Victor | 9,708 ft (2,959 m) | 426 | 39.9 °F (4.4 °C) |
| Colorado | Ophir | 9,695 ft (2,955 m) | 184 | 35.1 °F (1.7 °C) |
| Colorado | Breckenridge | 9,600 ft (2,926 m) | 5,020 | 33.5 °F (0.8 °C) |
| Colorado | Mountain Village | 9,545 ft (2,909 m) | 1,426 | No Data |
| Colorado | Cripple Creek | 9,494 ft (2,894 m) | 1,258 | No Data |
| Colorado | Ward | 9,450 ft (2,880 m) | 161 | No Data |
| Colorado | Mount Crested Butte | 9,375 ft (2,858 m) | 876 | No Data |
| New Mexico | Taos Ski Valley | 9,321 ft (2,841 m) | 169 | 38.0 |
| Colorado | Silverton | 9,318 ft (2,840 m) | 694 | 35.3 °F (1.8 °C) |
| Colorado | Pitkin | 9,216 ft (2,809 m) | 69 | No Data |
| Colorado | Dillon | 9,111 ft (2,777 m) | 967 | 34.9 °F (1.6 °C) |
| Colorado | Silver Plume | 9,101 ft (2,774 m) | 177 | No Data |
| Colorado | Frisco | 9,097 ft (2,773 m) | 3,174 | No Data |
| Colorado | Winter Park | 9,052 ft (2,759 m) | 1,090 | No Data |
| Colorado | Silverthorne | 9,035 ft (2,754 m) | 4,898 | 35.7 °F (2.1 °C) |

== Cities and towns above 8,000 feet (2,400 m) ==
| State | City | Elevation | Population |
|---|---|---|---|
| Colorado | Crested Butte | 8,909 ft (2,715 m) | 1,681 |
| Colorado | Creede | 8,952 ft (2,729 m) | 313 |
| Colorado | Rico | 8,825 ft (2,690 m) | 231 |
| Colorado | Telluride | 8,750 ft (2,667 m) | 2,479 |
| Colorado | Red Cliff | 8,750 ft (2,667 m) | 282 |
| Utah | Brighton | 8,707 ft (2,654 m) | 180 |
| New Mexico | Cloudcroft | 8,676 ft (2,644 m) | 701 |
| New Mexico | Red River | 8,671 ft (2,643 m) | 463 |
| Colorado | Lake City | 8,661 ft (2,640 m) | 394 |
| Colorado | Empire | 8,615 ft (2,626 m) | 304 |
| Colorado | Fraser | 8,574 ft (2,613 m) | 1,326 |
| Utah | Alta | 8,560 ft (2,609 m) | 379 |
| Colorado | Black Hawk | 8,536 ft (2,602 m) | 128 |
| Colorado | Georgetown | 8,530 ft (2,600 m) | 1,112 |
| Colorado | Woodland Park | 8,465 ft (2,580 m) | 7,885 |
| Arizona | Greer | 8,420 ft (2,566 m) | 58 |
| New Mexico | Angel Fire | 8,406 ft (2,562 m) | 1,070 |
| Colorado | Grand Lake | 8,369 ft (2,551 m) | 506 |
| New Mexico | Eagle Nest | 8,238 ft (2,511 m) | 251 |
| Colorado | Nederland | 8,228 ft (2,508 m) | 1,533 |
| Colorado | Snowmass Village | 8,209 ft (2,502 m) | 2,732 |
| Colorado | South Fork | 8,209 ft (2,502 m) | 425 |
| Colorado | Vail | 8,150 ft (2,484 m) | 5,434 |
| Colorado | Walden | 8,099 ft (2,469 m) | 599 |
| Arizona | Alpine | 8,006 ft (2,440 m) | 146 |
| Colorado | Aspen | 8,000 ft (2,438 m) | 7,365 |

== Cities and towns above 7,000 feet (2,100 m) ==
| State | City | Elevation | Population |
|---|---|---|---|
| Colorado | Silver Cliff | 7,986 ft (2,434 m) | 667 |
| Colorado | Buena Vista | 7,965 ft (2,428 m) | 2,866 |
| Colorado | Granby | 7,935 ft (2,419 m) | 2,139 |
| Colorado | Crestone | 7,923 ft (2,415 m) | 127 |
| Arizona | Jacob Lake | 7,920 ft (2,414 m) | 1314 |
| Colorado | Antonito | 7,890 ft (2,405 m) | 747 |
| Colorado | Del Norte | 7,888 ft (2,404 m) | 516 |
| California | Mammoth Lakes | 7,881 ft (2,402 m) | 8,127 |
| Colorado | Yampa | 7,881 ft (2,402 m) | 464 |
| New Mexico | Chama | 7,871 ft (2,399 m) | 992 |
| Colorado | Westcliffe | 7,867 ft (2,398 m) | 628 |
| Colorado | Minturn | 7,861 ft (2,396 m) | 1,145 |
| Colorado | Green Mountain | 7,800 ft (2,377 m) | 722 |
| Colorado | Ouray | 7,792 ft (2,375 m) | 1,010 |
| Utah | Scofield | 7,739 ft (2,359 m) | 23 |
| Colorado | Romeo | 7,736 ft (2,358 m) | 411 |
| Colorado | Gunnison | 7,703 ft (2,348 m) | 6,594 |
| Colorado | Saguache | 7,703 ft (2,348 m) | 505 |
| Arizona | Summerhaven | 7,700 ft (2,347 m) | 71 |
| Arizona | Nutrioso | 7,697 ft (2,346 m) | 39 |
| Colorado | Manassa | 7,690 ft (2,344 m) | 1,001 |
| Colorado | Sulphur Springs | 7,680 ft (2,341 m) | 733 |
| Colorado | Monte Vista | 7,664 ft (2,336 m) | 4,138 |
| Utah | Bryce | 7,664 ft (2,336 m) | 222 |
| Colorado | Center | 7,644 ft (2,330 m) | 2,264 |
| Colorado | Sanford | 7,605 ft (2,318 m) | 887 |
| Colorado | La Jara | 7,605 ft (2,318 m) | 817 |
| Arizona | Forest Lakes | 7,582 ft (2,311 m) | 155 |
| Colorado | Alamosa | 7,543 ft (2,299 m) | 9,591 |
| Colorado | Idaho Springs | 7,526 ft (2,294 m) | 1,786 |
| Colorado | Estes Park | 7,522 ft (2,293 m) | 6,426 |
| Arizona | Happy Jack | 7,493 ft (2,284 m) | 1406 |
| Colorado | Poncha Springs | 7,464 ft (2,275 m) | 956 |
| New Mexico | Questa | 7,461 ft (2,274 m) | 1,755 |
| Colorado | Avon | 7,431 ft (2,265 m) | 6,511 |
| Colorado | Oak Creek | 7,428 ft (2,264 m) | 959 |
| Arizona | McNary | 7,363 ft (2,244 m) | 484 |
| New Mexico | Los Alamos | 7,320 ft (2,231 m) | 12,019 |
| Colorado | Kremmling | 7,313 ft (2,229 m) | 1,524 |
| Wyoming | Encampment | 7,277 ft (2,218 m) | 452 |
| Wyoming | Elk Mountain | 7,264 ft (2,214 m) | 150 |
| Wyoming | Laramie | 7,220 ft (2,201 m) | 31,407 |
| New Mexico | Santa Fe | 7,199 ft (2,194 m) | 84,683 |
| Utah | Lyman | 7,182 ft (2,189 m) | 257 |
| Wyoming | Pinedale | 7,182 ft (2,189 m) | 2,005 |
| Colorado | Evergreen | 7,165 ft (2,184 m) | 9,307 |
| Wyoming | Riverside | 7,142 ft (2,177 m) | 66 |
| Colorado | Monument | 7,135 ft (2,175 m) | 10,399 |
| Colorado | Pagosa Springs | 7,126 ft (2,172 m) | 2,005 |
| Utah | Bicknell | 7,123 ft (2,171 m) | 336 |
| Colorado | Salida | 7,083 ft (2,159 m) | 6,082 |
| Arizona | Eagar | 7,080 ft (2,158 m) | 4,885 |
| Utah | Independence | 7,073 ft (2,156 m) | 198 |
| Wyoming | Superior | 7,070 ft (2,155 m) | 184 |
| Utah | Monticello | 7,070 ft (2,155 m) | 1,969 |
| Utah | Loa | 7,064 ft (2,153 m) | 575 |
| Utah | Alton | 7,041 ft (2,146 m) | 120 |
| Colorado | La Veta | 7,037 ft (2,145 m) | 811 |
| Colorado | Mancos | 7,028 ft (2,142 m) | 1,430 |
| Colorado | Norwood | 7,011 ft (2,137 m) | 579 |
| Utah | Park City | 7,000 ft (2,134 m) | 8,526 |

== Cities and towns above 6,000 feet (1,800 m) ==
| State | City | Elevation | Population |
|---|---|---|---|
| Colorado | Ridgway | 6,985 ft (2,129 m) | 1,039 |
| New Mexico | Taos | 6,969 ft (2,124 m) | 5,929 |
| Arizona | Springerville | 6,967 ft (2,124 m) | 1,961 |
| Wyoming | Kemmerer | 6,949 ft (2,118 m) | 2,415 |
| Utah | Fairview | 6,948 ft (2,118 m) | 1,358 |
| Wyoming | Dubois | 6,946 ft (2,117 m) | 911 |
| Arizona | Clints Well | 6,939 ft (2,115 m) | 9 |
| Colorado | Dolores | 6,936 ft (2,114 m) | 955 |
| New Mexico | Pecos | 6,923 ft (2,110 m) | 1,320 |
| New Mexico | Ruidoso | 6,920 ft (2,109 m) | 7,901 |
| Utah | Koosharem | 6,919 ft (2,109 m) | 330 |
| Utah | Hatch | 6,919 ft (2,109 m) | 142 |
| Arizona | Flagstaff | 6,910 ft (2,106 m) | 75,038 |
| New Mexico | Cuba | 6,906 ft (2,105 m) | 757 |
| Colorado | Bayfield | 6,900 ft (2,103 m) | 2,689 |
| Wyoming | Rock River | 6,896 ft (2,102 m) | 211 |
| Wyoming | Diamondville | 6,893 ft (2,101 m) | 520 |
| Wyoming | Bairoil | 6,887 ft (2,096 m) | 68 |
| Wyoming | Marbleton | 6,867 ft (2,093 m) | 861 |
| Colorado | Dove Creek | 6,844 ft (2,086 m) | 634 |
| Utah | Torrey | 6,837 ft (2,084 m) | 244 |
| Wyoming | Rawlins | 6,834 ft (2,083m) | 8,221 |
| Wyoming | Big Piney | 6,824 ft (2,080 m) | 395 |
| Wyoming | Hanna | 6,818 ft (2,078 m) | 683 |
| Wyoming | Mountain View | 6,804 ft (2,074 m) | 1,278 |
| Arizona | Pinetop-Lakeside | 6,804 ft (2,074 m) | 4,282 |
| Colorado | Crawford | 6,800 ft (2,073 m) | 433 |
| Wyoming | Saratoga | 6,791 ft (2,070 m) | 1,702 |
| Wyoming | Warmsutter | 6,772 ft (2,064 m) | 203 |
| Arizona | Williams | 6,766 ft (2,062 m) | 3,023 |
| Arizona | Window Rock | 6,765 ft (2,062 m) | 2500 |
| California | Big Bear Lake | 6,752 ft (2,058 m) | 5,279 |
| Wyoming | Evanston | 6,749 ft (2,057 m) | 11,747 |
| Colorado | Steamboat Springs | 6,732 ft (2,052 m) | 13,212 |
| Wyoming | Lyman | 6,706 ft (2,044 m) | 2,070 |
| Utah | Boulder | 6,703 ft (2,043 m) | 241 |
| New Mexico | Edgewood | 6,700 ft (2,042 m) | 6,107 |
| New Mexico | Corona | 6,690 ft (2,039 m) | 193 |
| New Mexico | Raton | 6,680 ft (2,036 m) | 5,938 |
| Wyoming | Opal | 6,670 ft (2,033 m) | 64 |
| Montana | West Yellowstone | 6,667 ft (2,032 m) | 1,271 |
| New Mexico | Des Moines | 6,647 ft (2,026 m) | 122 |
| Arizona | Heber Overgaard | 6,627 ft (2,020 m) | 2898 |
| Utah | Panguitch | 6,624 ft (2,019 m) | 1,682 |
| Arizona | Tusayan | 6,612 ft (2,015 m) | 558 |
| Colorado | Basalt | 6,611 ft (2,015 m) | 4,157 |
| Colorado | Eagle | 6,601 ft (2,012 m) | 6,986 |
| Wyoming | La Barge | 6,594 ft (2,010 m) | 394 |
| Wyoming | Sinclair | 6,588 ft (2,008 m) | 374 |
| Utah | Hideout | 6,588 ft (2,008 m) | 998 |
| New Mexico | Magdalena | 6,572 ft (2,003 m) | 878 |
| Wyoming | Medicine Bow | 6,565 ft (2,001 m) | 245 |
| Utah | Francis | 6,562 ft (2,000 m) | 1,574 |
| Arizona | Linden | 6,539 ft (1,993 m) | 2597 |
| Colorado | Calhan | 6,535 ft (1,992 m) | 834 |
| Wyoming | Bear River | 6,532 ft (1,991 m) | 522 |
| New Mexico | Milan | 6,519 ft (1,987 m) | 3,669 |
| New Mexico | Mountainair | 6,519 ft (1,987 m) | 873 |
| Utah | Tabiona | 6,516 ft (1,986 m) | 159 |
| Colorado | Durango | 6,512 ft (1,985 m) | 18,985 |
| Arizona | Munds Park | 6,510 ft (1,984 m) | 1,096 |
| Utah | Kamas | 6,486 ft (1,977 m) | 2,276 |
| Colorado | Elizabeth | 6,476 ft (1,974 m) | 1,566 |
| New Mexico | Gallup | 6,468 ft (1,971 m) | 21,493 |
| New Mexico | Grants | 6,460 ft (1,969 m) | 8,942 |
| Utah | Antimony | 6,453 ft (1,967 m) | 121 |
| Nevada | Ely | 6,437 ft (1,962 m) | 3,993 |
| Utah | Oakley | 6,434 ft (1,961 m) | 1,740 |
| New Mexico | Cimarron | 6,430 ft (1,960 m) | 881 |
| Utah | Eureka | 6,430 ft (1,960 m) | 707 |
| Utah | Dutch John | 6,430 ft (1,960 m) | 141 |
| New Mexico | Las Vegas | 6,424 ft (1,958 m) | 12,919 |
| New Mexico | Ruidoso Downs | 6,417 ft (1,956 m) | 2,574 |
| Colorado | Aguilar | 6,394 ft (1,949 m) | 480 |
| New Mexico | Folsom | 6,391 ft (1,948 m) | 57 |
| Wyoming | Rock Springs | 6,388 ft (1,947 m) | 23,526 |
| Utah | Altamont | 6,388 ft (1,947 m) | 277 |
| Colorado | Kiowa | 6,378 ft (1,944 m) | 761 |
| Colorado | Castle Pines | 6,368 ft (1,941 m) | 10,507 |
| Wyoming | Dixon | 6,355 ft (1,937 m) | 74 |
| New Mexico | Capitan | 6,348 ft (1,935 m) | 1,431 |
| Utah | Manila | 6,348 ft (1,935 m) | 307 |
| Arizona | Show Low | 6,345 ft (1,934 m) | 11,098 |
| Utah | Woodruff | 6,339 ft (1,932 m) | 212 |
| New Mexico | Tijeras | 6,322 ft (1,927 m) | 535 |
| Colorado | Gypsum | 6,312 ft (1,924 m) | 7,375 |
| Montana | Walkerville | 6,309 ft (1,923 m) | 708 |
| Utah | Tropic | 6,309 ft (1,923 m) | 514 |
| Oregon | Greenhorn | 6,306 ft (1,922 m) | 0 |
| Idaho | Island Park | 6,293 ft (1,918 m) | 286 |
| Utah | Randolph | 6,283 ft (1,915 m) | 508 |
| Wyoming | Granger | 6,273 ft (1,912 m) | 98 |
| Arizona | Third Mesa | 6,270 ft (1,911 m) | 1001 |
| Utah | Emery | 6,253 ft (1,906 m) | 268 |
| Wyoming | Star Valley Ranch | 6,253 ft (1,906 m) | 1,866 |
| Wyoming | Baggs | 6,247 ft (1,904 m) | 411 |
| Colorado | Meeker | 6,240 ft (1,902 m) | 2,252 |
| Wyoming | Afton | 6,240 ft (1,902 m) | 2,172 |
| California | South Lake Tahoe | 6,237 ft (1,901 m) | 21,978 |
| Wyoming | Jackson | 6,237 ft (1,901 m) | 10,760 |
| Colorado | Cedaredge | 6,230 ft (1,899 m) | 2,295 |
| Colorado | Castle Rock | 6,224 ft (1,897 m) | 64,827 |
| New Mexico | Moriarty | 6,220 ft (1,896 m) | 1,860 |
| Idaho | Victor | 6,214 ft (1,894 m) | 2,157 |
| New Mexico | Wagon Mound | 6,201 ft (1,890 m) | 287 |
| Colorado | Craig | 6,198 ft (1,889 m) | 9,022 |
| New Mexico | Jemez Springs | 6,197 ft (1,889 m) | 267 |
| Wyoming | Cokeville | 6,194 ft (1,888 m) | 502 |
| Colorado | Cortez | 6,191 ft (1,887 m) | 8,736 |
| Colorado | Carbondale | 6,181 ft (1,884 m) | 6,898 |
| Colorado | Walsenburg | 6,171 ft (1,881 m) | 3,029 |
| New Mexico | Encino | 6,119 ft (1,865 m) | 78 |
| Wyoming | Green River | 6,115 ft (1,864 m) | 11,825 |
| Idaho | Driggs | 6,109 ft (1,862 m) | 1,984 |
| New Mexico | Estancia | 6,109 ft (1,862 m) | 1,571 |
| Utah | Blanding | 6,106 ft (1,861 m) | 3,633 |
| New Mexico | Willard | 6,099 ft (1,859 m) | 242 |
| Utah | Circleville | 6,066 ft (1,849 m) | 489 |
| Wyoming | Cheyenne | 6,062 ft (1,848 m) | 65,132 |
| Colorado | Colorado Springs | 6,035 ft (1,839 m) | 465,101 |
| Utah | Parowan | 6,017 ft (1,834 m) | 3,165 |
| Utah | Kingston | 6,017 ft (1,834 m) | 155 |
| Colorado | Trinidad | 6,010 ft (1,832 m) | 9,096 |
| Utah | Junction | 6,007 ft (1,831 m) | 172 |

== Cities and towns above 5,000 feet (1,500 m) ==
| State | City | Elevation | Population |
|---|---|---|---|
| Utah | Henrieville | 5,997 ft (1,828 m) | 225 |
| Arizona | Valle | 5,994 ft (1,827 m) | 832 |
| Idaho | Montpelier | 5,981 ft (1,823 m) | 2,643 |
| New Mexico | Grenville | 5,981 ft (1,823 m) | 29 |
| New Mexico | Santa Clara | 5,978 ft (1,822 m) | 1,761 |
| New Mexico | Vaughn | 5,978 ft (1,822 m) | 397 |
| Utah | Laketown | 5,974 ft (1,821 m) | 276 |
| Utah | Ferron | 5,971 ft (1,820 m) | 1,495 |
| Utah | Garden City | 5,968 ft (1,819 m) | 617 |
| Arizona | Second Mesa | 5,962 ft (1,817 m) | 843 |
| Arizona | Christopher Creek | 5,961 ft (1,817 m) | 156 |
| Colorado | Lone Tree | 5,948 ft (1,813 m) | 14,653 |
| Idaho | Shelley | 5,945 ft (1,812 m) | 1,783 |
| Utah | Clawson | 5,942 ft (1,811 m) | 186 |
| Utah | Mount Pleasant | 5,925 ft (1,806 m) | 3,530 |
| New Mexico | Maxwell | 5,925 ft (1,806 m) | 212 |
| Utah | Interlaken | 5,919 ft (1,804 m) | 235 |
| Wyoming | Thayne | 5,906 ft (1,800 m) | 380 |
| Utah | Beaver | 5,902 ft (1,799 m) | 3,185 |
| Utah | Fountain Green | 5,899 ft (1,798 m) | 1,166 |
| New Mexico | Roy | 5,896 ft (1,797 m) | 211 |
| New Mexico | Silver City | 5,895 ft (1,797 m) | 9,386 |
| Utah | Cannonville | 5,886 ft (1,794 m) | 173 |
| Utah | Paragonah | 5,879 ft (1,792 m) | 545 |
| Colorado | Parker | 5,869 ft (1,789 m) | 55,636 |
| Utah | Marysvale | 5,863 ft (1,787 m) | 437 |
| Idaho | Ketchum | 5,853 ft (1,784 m) | 3,555 |
| Utah | Cedar City | 5,846 ft (1,782 m) | 34,764 |
| Colorado | Centennial | 5,830 ft (1,777 m) | 110,250 |
| Utah | Spring City | 5,823 ft (1,775 m) | 1,080 |
| New Mexico | Bayard | 5,820 ft (1,774 m) | 2,123 |
| Utah | Escalante | 5,820 ft (1,774 m) | 798 |
| California | Truckee | 5,817 ft (1,773 m) | 16,391 |
| Utah | Helper | 5,817 ft (1,773 m) | 2,105 |
| Colorado | Montrose | 5,807 ft (1,770 m) | 19,512 |
| Arizona | Strawberry | 5,800 ft (1,768 m) | 943 |
| New Mexico | Springer | 5,797 ft (1,767 m) | 906 |
| Utah | Huntington | 5,787 ft (1,764 m) | 1,934 |
| Utah | Orangeville | 5,778 ft (1,761 m) | 1,326 |
| Utah | Glendale | 5,778 ft (1,761 m) | 407 |
| Idaho | Soda Springs | 5,774 ft (1,760 m) | 3,133 |
| Arizona | Crown King | 5,771 ft (1,759 m) | 133 |
| New Mexico | Reserve | 5,771 ft (1,759 m) | 277 |
| Colorado | Glenwood Springs | 5,761 ft (1,756 m) | 9,930 |
| Arizona | Taylor | 5,761 ft (1,756 m) | 4,112 |
| Wyoming | Meeteetse | 5,751 ft (1,753 m) | 309 |
| Utah | Cleveland | 5,722 ft (1,744 m) | 440 |
| Arizona | Chambers | 5,722 ft (1,744 m) | 1,022 |
| New Mexico | Hurley | 5,722 ft (1,744 m) | 1,176 |
| Utah | Daniel | 5,715 ft (1,742 m) | 1,077 |
| Arizona | Kayenta | 5,712 ft (1,741 m) | 4670 |
| Utah | Elmo | 5,692 ft (1,735 m) | 402 |
| Arizona | St. Johns | 5,686 ft (1,733 m) | 3,480 |
| Arizona | Snowflake | 5,682 ft (1,732 m) | 5,590 |
| Utah | Castle Dale | 5,676 ft (1,730 m) | 1,491 |
| Utah | Wallsburg | 5,676 ft (1,730 m) | 385 |
| Colorado | Golden | 5,675 ft (1,730 m) | 21,254 |
| New Mexico | Aztec | 5,646 ft (1,721 m) | 6,369 |
| Wyoming | Alpine | 5,633 ft (1,717 m) | 1,220 |
| Nevada | Wells | 5,630 ft (1,716 m) | 1,252 |
| Utah | Price | 5,627 ft (1,715 m) | 8,332 |
| Utah | Wales | 5,627 ft (1,715 m) | 373 |
| Utah | Manti | 5,610 ft (1,710 m) | 3,738 |
| Utah | Heber City | 5,604 ft (1,708 m) | 17,082 |
| New Mexico | Española | 5,595 ft (1,705 m) | 10,044 |
| New Mexico | Mosquero | 5,591 ft (1,704 m) | 85 |
| Utah | Midway | 5,584 ft (1,702 m) | 5,280 |
| Utah | Coalville | 5,577 ft (1,700 m) | 1,596 |
| Utah | Sterling | 5,574 ft (1,699 m) | 320 |
| Colorado | Fountain | 5,545 ft (1,690 m) | 30,454 |
| Utah | Enoch | 5,545 ft (1,690 m) | 7,180 |
| Utah | Ephraim | 5,541 ft (1,689 m) | 7,308 |
| Utah | Kanarraville | 5,541 ft (1,689 m) | 407 |
| Montana | Butte | 5,538 ft (1,688 m) | 34,284 |
| Arizona | Bisbee | 5,538 ft (1,688 m) | 5,575 |
| Utah | Mayfield | 5,538 ft (1,688 m) | 552 |
| Idaho | Grace | 5,535 ft (1,687 m) | 920 |
| Utah | Moroni | 5,531 ft (1,686 m) | 1,552 |
| Wyoming | Burns | 5,518 ft (1,682 m) | 356 |
| Colorado | Lakewood | 5,518 ft (1,682 m) | 154,393 |
| Utah | Duchesne | 5,518 ft (1,682 m) | 1,710 |
| Utah | Vernon | 5,515 ft (1,681 m) | 356 |
| Arizona | Chinle | 5,506 ft (1,678 m) | 4573 |
| North Carolina | Beech Mountain | 5,506 ft (1,678 m) | 323 |
| Colorado | Superior | 5,495 ft (1,675 m) | 13,175 |
| New Mexico | San Ysidro | 5,466 ft (1,666 m) | 201 |
| Wyoming | Pavilion | 5,463 ft (1,665 m) | 230 |
| Colorado | Wheat Ridge | 5,459 ft (1,664 m) | 31,400 |
| New Mexico | Bloomfield | 5,456 ft (1,663 m) | 7,685 |
| Utah | Charleston | 5,440 ft (1,658 m) | 487 |
| Utah | Joseph | 5,436 ft (1,657 m) | 358 |
| New Mexico | Carrizozo | 5,429 ft (1,655 m) | 935 |
| Colorado | Greenwood Village | 5,422 ft (1,653 m) | 15,801 |
| Colorado | Broomfield | 5,420 ft (1,652 m) | 69,267 |
| Utah | Wellington | 5,413 ft (1,650 m) | 1,620 |
| Colorado | Aurora | 5,403 ft (1,647 m) | 361,710 |
| Utah | Hildale | 5,409 ft (1,649 m) | 2,896 |
| New Mexico | Farmington | 5,395 ft (1,644 m) | 44,372 |
| Utah | Monroe | 5,394 ft (1,644 m) | 2,258 |
| Colorado | Westminster | 5,384 ft (1,641 m) | 113,479 |
| Colorado | Northglenn | 5,377 ft (1,639 m) | 39,010 |
| Colorado | Englewood | 5,371 ft (1,637 m) | 34,690 |
| Arizona | Pine | 5,369 ft (1,636 m) | 1953 |
| Arizona | Prescott | 5,368 ft (1,636 m) | 42,731 |
| Wyoming | Lander | 5,358 ft (1,633 m) | 7,546 |
| Utah | Richfield | 5,354 ft (1,632 m) | 7,888 |
| Utah | Elk Ridge | 5,354 ft (1,632 m) | 4,335 |
| Wyoming | Rolling Hills | 5,354 ft (1,632 m) | 427 |
| Colorado | Thornton | 5,351 ft (1,631 m) | 136,703 |
| Colorado | Littleton | 5,351 ft (1,631 m) | 48,007 |
| Utah | Elsinore | 5,351 ft (1,631 m) | 882 |
| Colorado | Arvada | 5,344 ft (1,629 m) | 117,453 |
| Arizona | KOHLS Ranch | 5,340 ft (1,628 m) | 30 |
| Wyoming | Albin | 5,338 ft (1,627 m) | 169 |
| Colorado | Louisville | 5,335 ft (1,626 m) | 21,163 |
| Utah | Henefer | 5,335 ft (1,626 m) | 979 |
| Colorado | Cañon City | 5,332 ft (1,625 m) | 16,750 |
| Utah | Woodland Hills | 5,331 ft (1,625 m) | 1,590 |
| Colorado | Boulder | 5,328 ft (1,624 m) | 107,125 |
| Utah | Vernal | 5,328 ft (1,624 m) | 10,438 |
| Idaho | Arco | 5,325 ft (1,623 m) | 879 |
| Idaho | Hailey | 5,318 ft (1,621 m) | 7,960 |
| Utah | Enterprise | 5,318 ft (1,621 m) | 1,663 |
| South Dakota | Custer | 5,315 ft (1,620 m) | 1,935 |
| Utah | Levan | 5,315 ft (1,620 m) | 954 |
| Utah | Scipio | 5,315 ft (1,620 m) | 332 |
| New Mexico | Albuquerque | 5,312 ft (1,619 m) | 560,218 |
| Utah | Central Valley | 5,305 ft (1,617 m) | 570 |
| Arizona | Seligman | 5,305 ft (1,617 m) | 446 |
| Utah | New Harmony | 5,305 ft (1,617 m) | 234 |
| Wyoming | Chugwater | 5,295 ft (1,614 m) | 175 |
| Colorado | Federal Heights | 5,292 ft (1,613 m) | 12,845 |
| Utah | Annabella | 5,292 ft (1,613 m) | 810 |
| Utah | Mantua | 5,292 ft (1,613 m) | 963 |
| Wyoming | Bar Nunn | 5,285 ft (1,611 m) | 2,981 |
| New Mexico | Rio Rancho | 5,282 ft (1,610 m) | 99,178 |
| Utah | Minersville | 5,282 ft (1,610 m) | 920 |
| Colorado | Denver | 5,280 ft (1,609 m) | 716,492 |
| Montana | Anaconda | 5,276 ft (1,608 m) | 9,131 |
| Utah | Glenwood | 5,272 ft (1,607 m) | 476 |
| Idaho | Ashton | 5,259 ft (1,603 m) | 949 |
| Idaho | Challis | 5,253 ft (1,601 m) | 902 |
| Wyoming | Manville | 5,253 ft (1,601 m) | 92 |
| Utah | Naples | 5,230 ft (1,594 m) | 2,082 |
| Utah | Sigurd | 5,226 ft (1,593 m) | 443 |
| South Dakota | Lead | 5,213 ft (1,589 m) | 2,985 |
| Colorado | Lafayette | 5,210 ft (1,588 m) | 28,924 |
| Utah | Aurora | 5,200 ft (1,585 m) | 1,052 |
| New Mexico | Kirtland | 5,187 ft (1,581 m) | 601 |
| Arizona | Young | 5,184 ft (1,580 m) | 561 |
| Arizona | Ashfork | 5,181 ft (1,579 m) | 361 |
| Idaho | Bellevue | 5,167 ft (1,575 m) | 2,560 |
| Arizona | Whiteriver | 5,164 ft (1,574 m) | 4329 |
| Colorado | Commerce City | 5,164 ft (1,574 m) | 58,449 |
| Utah | Salina | 5,161 ft (1,573 m) | 2,612 |
| South Dakota | Hill City | 5,159 ft (1,572 m) | 1,002 |
| Wyoming | Casper | 5,150 ft (1,570 m) | 59,038 |
| Utah | Gunnison | 5,138 ft (1,566 m) | 3,585 |
| Utah | Fillmore | 5,135 ft (1,565 m) | 2,650 |
| Colorado | Erie | 5,130 ft (1,564 m) | 25,447 |
| Utah | Nephi | 5,128 ft (1,563 m) | 6,378 |
| Wyoming | Evansville | 5,125 ft (1,562 m) | 2,746 |
| Wyoming | Mills | 5,125 ft (1,562 m) | 4,034 |
| Wyoming | Wright | 5,121 ft (1,561 m) | 1,644 |
| Utah | Stockton | 5,118 ft (1,560 m) | 682 |
| Utah | Oak City | 5,112 ft (1,558 m) | 649 |
| Utah | Redmond | 5,105 ft (1,556 m) | 747 |
| Utah | Holden | 5,102 ft (1,555 m) | 393 |
| Utah | Centerfield | 5,098 ft (1,554 m) | 1,495 |
| Utah | Roosevelt | 5,095 ft (1,553 m) | 7,233 |
| Utah | Myton | 5,085 ft (1,550 m) | 606 |
| Utah | Cedar Fort | 5,085 ft (1,550 m) | 395 |
| Wyoming | Hudson | 5,085 ft (1,550 m) | 431 |
| Arizona | Holbrook | 5,082 ft (1,549 m) | 5,053 |
| Utah | Morgan | 5,069 ft (1,545 m) | 4,273 |
| Nevada | Elko | 5,066 ft (1,544 m) | 20,452 |
| Arizona | Jerome | 5,066 ft (1,544 m) | 444 |
| Arizona | Fort Apache | 5,059 ft (1,542 m) | 143 |
| New Mexico | Clayton | 5,056 ft (1,541 m) | 2,681 |
| New Mexico | Bernalillo | 5,052 ft (1,540 m) | 10,477 |
| Utah | Fayette | 5,052 ft (1,540 m) | 263 |
| Utah | Tooele | 5,050 ft (1,539 m) | 36,015 |
| Wyoming | Pine Bluffs | 5,049 ft (1,539 m) | 1,172 |
| Utah | Ballard | 5,049 ft (1,539 m) | 1,093 |
| Utah | Rush Valley | 5,043 ft (1,537 m) | 494 |
| Arizona | Prescott Valley | 5,026 ft (1,532 m) | 45,500 |
| New Mexico | Corrales | 5,023 ft (1,531 m) | 8,696 |
| Utah | Kanosh | 5,020 ft (1,530 m) | 485 |
| Wyoming | Lusk | 5,020 ft (1,530 m) | 1,541 |
| Wyoming | Glenrock | 5,020 ft (1,530 m) | 2,420 |
| Wyoming | Cody | 5,016 ft (1,529 m) | 10,028 |
| Idaho | McCall | 5,013 ft (1,528 m) | 3,686 |
| Arizona | Cherry | 5,007 ft (1,526 m) | 10 |
| Colorado | Fort Collins | 5,003 ft (1,525 m) | 164,207 |
| Utah | Herriman | 5,000 ft (1,524 m) | 51,348 |
| Arizona | Payson | 5,000 ft (1,524 m) | 15,301 |

== Cities and towns above 4,000 feet (1,200 m) ==
| State | City | Elevation | Population |
|---|---|---|---|
| Wyoming | Lost Springs | 4,997 ft (1,523 m) | 6 |
| Utah | Rocky Ridge | 4,990 ft (1,521 m) | 858 |
| New Mexico | Los Ranchos de Albuquerque | 4,987 ft (1,520 m) | 6,108 |
| Colorado | Longmont | 4,984 ft (1,519 m) | 96,577 |
| Colorado | Brighton | 4,984 ft (1,519 m) | 41,254 |
| Colorado | Frederick | 4,984 ft (1,519 m) | 13,480 |
| Utah | Santaquin | 4,984 ft (1,519 m) | 12,865 |
| Colorado | Loveland | 4,982 ft (1,519 m) | 77,446 |
| Utah | Highland | 4,977 ft (1,517 m) | 19,175 |
| Arizona | Colorado City | 4,977 ft (1,517 m) | 4,821 |
| Colorado | Firestone | 4,970 ft (1,515 m) | 14,860 |
| Utah | Kanab | 4,970 ft (1,515 m) | 4,931 |
| Utah | Mona | 4,970 ft (1,515 m) | 1,807 |
| Idaho | St. Anthony | 4,967 ft (1,514 m) | 3,606 |
| Utah | Milford | 4,967 ft (1,514 m) | 1,394 |
| Arizona | Cibecue | 4,964 ft (1,513 m) | 1,816 |
| Utah | Apple Valley | 4,961 ft (1,512 m) | 844 |
| Utah | Cedar Hills | 4,957 ft (1,511 m) | 10,083 |
| Wyoming | Riverton | 4,951 ft (1,509 m) | 10,682 |
| Utah | Alpine | 4,951 ft (1,509 m) | 10,498 |
| California | Loyalton | 4,951 ft (1,509 m) | 702 |
| Idaho | Teton | 4,948 ft (1,508 m) | 787 |
| Utah | Huntsville | 4,928 ft (1,502 m) | 642 |
| Arizona | Tuba City | 4,918 ft (1,499 m) | 8312 |
| Nevada | Carlin | 4,905 ft (1,495 m) | 2,277 |
| Utah | Paradise | 4,902 ft (1,494 m) | 1,022 |
| Wyoming | Edgerton | 4,898 ft (1,493 m) | 153 |
| Idaho | Sugar City | 4,895 ft (1,492 m) | 1,715 |
| Texas | Fort Davis | 4,892 ft (1,491 m) | 1,201 |
| Arizona | Payson | 4,890 ft (1,490 m) | 15,520 |
| Arizona | Sonoita | 4,885 ft (1,489 m) | 800 |
| Utah | Eagle Mountain | 4,882 ft (1,488 m) | 38,391 |
| Utah | Clarkston | 4,879 ft (1,487 m) | 740 |
| Utah | Fairfield | 4,879 ft (1,487 m) | 145 |
| Arizona | Peach Springs | 4,876 ft (1,486 m) | 1098 |
| New Mexico | Bosque Farms | 4,865 ft (1,483 m) | 3,888 |
| Texas | Marfa | 4,865 ft (1,483 m) | 1,625 |
| Nebraska | Harrison | 4,865 ft (1,483 m) | 223 |
| Idaho | Rexburg | 4,865 ft (1,483 m) | 28,222 |
| New Mexico | Peralta | 4,862 ft (1,482 m) | 3,584 |
| New Mexico | Los Lunas | 4,856 ft (1,480 m) | 16,061 |
| Idaho | Rigby | 4,856 ft (1,480 m) | 5,038 |
| California | Portola | 4,856 ft (1,480 m) | 1,930 |
| Colorado | Johnstown | 4,852 ft (1,479 m) | 14,795 |
| Arizona | Winslow | 4,850 ft (1,478 m) | 9,655 |
| Wyoming | Midwest | 4,849 ft (1,478 m) | 285 |
| West Virginia | Snowshoe | 4,848 ft (1,478 m) | 285 |
| Wyoming | Shoshoni | 4,843 ft (1,476 m) | 163 |
| Utah | Meadow | 4,839 ft (1,475 m) | 328 |
| Wyoming | Douglas | 4,836 ft (1,474 m) | 6,386 |
| Utah | Cottonwood Heights | 4,823 ft (1,470 m) | 33,843 |
| Montana | Bozeman | 4,820 ft (1,469 m) | 48,532 |
| New Mexico | Belen | 4,810 ft (1,466 m) | 7,360 |
| Idaho | Ucon | 4,810 ft (1,466 m) | 1,160 |
| Nevada | Carson City | 4,802 ft (1,464 m) | 55,916 |
| Oregon | Lakeview | 4,802 ft (1,464 m) | 2,310 |
| Utah | Bountiful | 4,797 ft (1,462 m) | 43,981 |
| Colorado | Windsor | 4,797 ft (1,462 m) | 28,967 |
| Utah | Lynndyl | 4,787 ft (1,459 m) | 117 |
| Idaho | Iona | 4,783 ft (1,458 m) | 2,717 |
| Idaho | McCammon | 4,783 ft (1,458 m) | 825 |
| Arizona | Yarnell | 4,780 ft (1,457 m) | 570 |
| Utah | Orem | 4,774 ft (1,455 m) | 97,828 |
| Idaho | Cascade | 4,760 ft (1,451 m) | 1,005 |
| Wyoming | Wheatland | 4,751 ft (1,448 m) | 3,588 |
| Wyoming | Van Tassell | 4,741 ft (1,445 m) | 22 |
| Wyoming | Sundance | 4,738 ft (1,444 m) | 1,032 |
| Utah | Mapleton | 4,731 ft (1,442 m) | 10,731 |
| Utah | Leamington | 4,731 ft (1,442 m) | 239 |
| Wyoming | Glendo | 4,724 ft (1,440 m) | 237 |
| Idaho | Ammon | 4,715 ft (1,437 m) | 15,252 |
| Idaho | Preston | 4,715 ft (1,437 m) | 5,591 |
| Nebraska | Kimball | 4,715 ft (1,437 m) | 2,578 |
| Arizona | Chino Valley | 4,707 ft (1,435 m) | 11,250 |
| Idaho | Idaho Falls | 4,705 ft (1,434 m) | 61,076 |
| New Mexico | House | 4,705 ft (1,434 m) | 62 |
| Utah | Payson | 4,700 ft (1,433 m) | 20,303 |
| Utah | Hyrum | 4,698 ft (1,432 m) | 8,619 |
| Utah | Fruit Heights | 4,698 ft (1,432 m) | 6,221 |
| Arizona | Mayer | 4,695 ft (1,431 m) | 1408 |
| Oregon | Granite | 4,695 ft (1,431 m) | 36 |
| Colorado | Pueblo | 4,692 ft (1,430 m) | 111,127 |
| Utah | North Logan | 4,692 ft (1,430 m) | 10,590 |
| Oregon | Seneca | 4,690 ft (1,430 m) | 229 |
| Utah | Castle Valley | 4,685 ft (1,428 m) | 350 |
| Wyoming | Hartville | 4,682 ft (1,427 m) | 64 |
| Colorado | Greeley | 4,675 ft (1,425 m) | 105,448 |
| Arizona | Fredonia | 4,671 ft (1,424 m) | 1,314 |
| Colorado | Evans | 4,652 ft (1,418 m) | 21,236 |
| Arizona | Star Valley | 4,650 ft (1,417 m) | 2,310 |
| Wyoming | Kaycee | 4,649 ft (1,417 m) | 247 |
| Wyoming | Buffalo | 4,646 ft (1,416 m) | 4,415 |
| Utah | Lindon | 4,642 ft (1,415 m) | 11,100 |
| Utah | Delta | 4,639 ft (1,414 m) | 3,602 |
| Arizona | Sierra Vista | 4,633 ft (1,412 m) | 43,208 |
| Idaho | Shelley | 4,633 ft (1,412 m) | 4,785 |
| New Mexico | Santa Rosa | 4,616 ft (1,407 m) | 2,636 |
| Utah | Millville | 4,616 ft (1,407 m) | 2,150 |
| Utah | Washington Terrace | 4,610 ft (1,405 m) | 9,248 |
| Utah | Salem | 4,610 ft (1,405 m) | 8,621 |
| Utah | Richmond | 4,610 ft (1,405 m) | 2,803 |
| Utah | American Fork | 4,606 ft (1,404 m) | 33,161 |
| Utah | Smithfield | 4,603 ft (1,403 m) | 12,025 |
| New Mexico | Socorro | 4,603 ft (1,403 m) | 8,348 |
| Utah | Hinckley | 4,603 ft (1,403 m) | 716 |
| Utah | Genola | 4,600 ft (1,402 m) | 1,567 |
| New Mexico | Grady | 4,600 ft (1,402 m) | 103 |
| Utah | Providence | 4,596 ft (1,401 m) | 7,780 |
| Colorado | Grand Junction | 4,593 ft (1,400 m) | 63,374 |
| Wyoming | La Grange | 4,590 ft (1,399 m) | 372 |
| Arizona | Dewey–Humboldt | 4,581 ft (1,396 m) | 3,894 |
| Utah | River Heights | 4,580 ft (1,396 m) | 2,076 |
| South Dakota | Nemo | 4,580 ft (1,396 m) | 467 |
| Utah | Spanish Fork | 4,577 ft (1,395 m) | 40,913 |
| Idaho | Oakley | 4,570 ft (1,393 m) | 786 |
| Utah | Vineyard | 4,557 ft (1,389 m) | 11,866 |
| Utah | Lehi | 4,564 ft (1,391 m) | 69,724 |
| Utah | Howell | 4,560 ft (1,390 m) | 254 |
| Utah | Nibley | 4,554 ft (1,388 m) | 7,135 |
| Wyoming | Gillette | 4,554 ft (1,388 m) | 33,403 |
| Utah | Provo | 4,551 ft (1,387 m) | 117,335 |
| Utah | South Weber | 4,551 ft (1,387 m) | 7,836 |
| Idaho | Malad City | 4,551 ft (1,387 m) | 2,299 |
| Utah | Goshen | 4,551 ft (1,387 m) | 915 |
| Utah | Wellsville | 4,547 ft (1,386 m) | 3,941 |
| Utah | Snowville | 4,547 ft (1,386 m) | 173 |
| Idaho | Inkom | 4,544 ft (1,385 m) | 792 |
| Utah | Roy | 4,541 ft (1,384 m) | 39,613 |
| Arizona | Tombstone | 4,539 ft (1,383 m) | 1,380 |
| Utah | Hyde Park | 4,537 ft (1,383 m) | 4,797 |
| Utah | Uintah | 4,537 ft (1,383 m) | 1,353 |
| Utah | Logan | 4,534 ft (1,382 m) | 50,371 |
| Utah | Newton | 4,534 ft (1,382 m) | 817 |
| South Dakota | Deadwood | 4,531 ft (1,381 m) | 1,548 |
| Colorado | Fruita | 4,514 ft (1,376 m) | 13,406 |
| Utah | Sunset | 4,511 ft (1,375 m) | 5,364 |
| New Mexico | Tularosa | 4,508 ft (1,374 m) | 3,006 |
| Utah | Lewiston | 4,508 ft (1,374 m) | 1,798 |
| Nevada | Reno | 4,505 ft (1,373 m) | 255,601 |
| Utah | Draper | 4,505 ft (1,373 m) | 48,587 |
| Utah | Saratoga Springs | 4,505 ft (1,373 m) | 33,282 |
| Utah | North Ogden | 4,501 ft (1,372 m) | 19,465 |
| Idaho | Franklin | 4,501 ft (1,372 m) | 1,025 |
| Idaho | Blackfoot | 4,498 ft (1,371 m) | 11,890 |
| Utah | Mendon | 4,495 ft (1,370 m) | 1,396 |
| Utah | Plymouth | 4,488 ft (1,368 m) | 460 |
| Utah | Cornish | 4,485 ft (1,367 m) | 337 |
| Texas | Alpine | 4,475 ft (1,364 m) | 5,905 |
| Idaho | Chubbuck | 4,472 ft (1,363 m) | 14,644 |
| Utah | Clearfield | 4,465 ft (1,361 m) | 32,118 |
| New Mexico | Elephant Butte | 4,465 ft (1,361 m) | 1,310 |
| Utah | Holladay | 4,464 ft (1,361 m) | 30,325 |
| Idaho | Pocatello | 4,462 ft (1,360 m) | 54,746 |
| Nevada | West Wendover | 4,462 ft (1,360 m) | 4,273 |
| Utah | Trenton | 4,462 ft (1,360 m) | 552 |
| Utah | Sandy | 4,450 ft (1,356 m) | 96,380 |
| Utah | South Ogden | 4,449 ft (1,356 m) | 17,199 |
| Wyoming | Ten Sleep | 4,426 ft (1,349 m) | 246 |
| Utah | South Jordan | 4,439 ft (1,353 m) | 76,598 |
| Utah | Riverton | 4,439 ft (1,353 m) | 44,440 |
| Utah | Amalga | 4,439 ft (1,353 m) | 558 |
| Utah | Deweyville | 4,437 ft (1,352 m) | 373 |
| Wyoming | Burlington | 4,436 ft (1,352 m) | 312 |
| Utah | Brigham City | 4,436 ft (1,352 m) | 19,182 |
| Utah | Bluffdale | 4,436 ft (1,352 m) | 16,358 |
| Oregon | Sumpter | 4,429 ft (1,350 m) | 206 |
| Nevada | Sparks | 4,413 ft (1,345 m) | 105,006 |
| New Mexico | Melrose | 4,413 ft (1,345 m) | 629 |
| Idaho | American Falls | 4,406 ft (1,343 m) | 4,568 |
| Nevada | Caliente | 4,406 ft (1,343 m) | 1,076 |
| Idaho | Aberdeen | 4,403 ft (1,342 m) | 1,756 |
| Utah | Pleasant View | 4,400 ft (1,341 m) | 10,287 |
| Arizona | Huachuca City | 4,400 ft (1,341 m) | 1,853 |
| Utah | Clinton | 4,393 ft (1,339 m) | 22,499 |
| Wyoming | Powell | 4,393 ft (1,339 m) | 6,419 |
| Nevada | Yerington | 4,390 ft (1,338 m) | 3,241 |
| Oregon | Jordan Valley | 4,385 ft (1,337 m) | 177 |
| Utah | Midvale | 4,383 ft (1,336 m) | 34,124 |
| Utah | Centerville | 4,377 ft (1,334 m) | 17,587 |
| Utah | Woods Cross | 4,377 ft (1,334 m) | 11,431 |
| Utah | West Jordan | 4,373 ft (1,333 m) | 113,905 |
| Utah | Fielding | 4,373 ft (1,333 m) | 482 |
| Utah | Riverdale | 4,370 ft (1,332 m) | 8,838 |
| California | Alturas | 4,370 ft (1,332 m) | 2,563 |
| Oregon | Paisley | 4,369 ft (1,332 m) | 250 |
| Utah | Perry | 4,367 ft (1,331 m) | 5,248 |
| Utah | Portage | 4,367 ft (1,331 m) | 273 |
| New Mexico | Elida | 4,360 ft (1,329 m) | 176 |
| Utah | Kaysville | 4,357 ft (1,328 m) | 32,390 |
| Wyoming | Guernsey | 4,354 ft (2,327 m) | 1,130 |
| Utah | Layton | 4,350 ft (1,326 m) | 78,014 |
| Arizona | Sedona | 4,350 ft (1,326 m) | 10,336 |
| Utah | Willard | 4,350 ft (1,326 m) | 1,958 |
| Wyoming | East Thermopolis | 4,341 ft (1,323 m) | 229 |
| Utah | Garland | 4,340 ft (1,323 m) | 2,590 |
| New Mexico | Alamogordo | 4,336 ft (1,322 m) | 31,283 |
| New Mexico | Deming | 4,335 ft (1,321 m) | 13,880 |
| Utah | North Salt Lake | 4,334 ft (1,321 m) | 20,948 |
| South Dakota | Keystone | 4,331 ft (1,320 m) | 427 |
| Wyoming | Thermopolis | 4,331 ft (1,320 m) | 2,725 |
| Wyoming | Newcastle | 4,327 ft (1,319 m) | 3,374 |
| Utah | Tremonton | 4,325 ft (1,318 m) | 9,206 |
| Colorado | Fort Morgan | 4,324 ft (1,318 m) | 11,359 |
| Utah | West Point | 4,314 ft (1,315 m) | 10,957 |
| Utah | West Valley City | 4,304 ft (1,312 m) | 136,170 |
| Utah | Farmington | 4,304 ft (1,312 m) | 25,339 |
| Utah | Grantsville | 4,304 ft (1,312 m) | 12,064 |
| Utah | Murray | 4,301 ft (1,311 m) | 48,917 |
| Utah | Ogden | 4,300 ft (1,311 m) | 87,773 |
| Utah | Honeyville | 4,298 ft (1,310 m) | 1,644 |
| Utah | Elwood | 4,298 ft (1,310 m) | 1,103 |
| Utah | Taylorsville | 4,295 ft (1,309 m) | 59,805 |
| Nevada | Winnemucca | 4,295 ft (1,309 m) | 7,754 |
| Utah | Hanksville | 4,295 ft (1,309 m) | 220 |
| Utah | Harrisville | 4,291 ft (1,308 m) | 6,872 |
| Utah | Wendover | 4,291 ft (1,308 m) | 1,489 |
| New Mexico | Dora | 4,291 ft (1,308 m) | 121 |
| Utah | Syracuse | 4,285 ft (1,306 m) | 31,458 |
| Utah | West Haven | 4,272 ft (1,302 m) | 16,109 |
| New Mexico | Clovis | 4,268 ft (1,301 m) | 39,373 |
| Wyoming | Kirby | 4,268 ft (1,301 m) | 76 |
| Utah | West Bountiful | 4,268 ft (1,301 m) | 5,800 |
| Utah | Farr West | 4,265 ft (1,300 m) | 7,385 |
| Wyoming | Yoder | 4,259 ft (1,298 m) | |
| Utah | Bear River City | 4,258 ft (1,298 m) | 898 |
| Utah | Marriott-Slaterville | 4,252 ft (1,296 m) | 1,898 |
| New Mexico | Lordsburg | 4,250 ft (1,295 m) | 2,398 |
| New Mexico | Truth or Consequences | 4,245 ft (1,294 m) | 5,753 |
| California | Dorris | 4,245 ft (1,294 m) | 897 |
| Utah | Hooper | 4,242 ft (1,293 m) | 9,152 |
| Utah | Plain City | 4,242 ft (1,293 m) | 7,669 |
| Wyoming | Upton | 4,239 ft (1,292 m) | 898 |
| Wyoming | Fort Laramie | 4,239 ft (1,292 m) | 206 |
| Oregon | La Pine | 4,236 ft (1,291 m) | 1,929 |
| New Mexico | Williamsburg | 4,236 ft (1,291 m) | 408 |
| Utah | Salt Lake City | 4,226 ft (1,288 m) | 200,567 |
| Utah | Corinne | 4,226 ft (1,288 m) | 763 |
| Wyoming | Moorcroft | 4,226 ft (1,288 m) | 946 |
| Utah | South Salt Lake | 4,225 ft (1,288 m) | 25,582 |
| Wyoming | Frannie | 4,216 ft (1,285 m) | 145 |
| Arizona | Cameron | 4,206 ft (1,282 m) | 734 |
| Oregon | Joseph | 4,190 ft (1,277 m) | 1,124 |
| California | Susanville | 4,186 ft (1,276 m) | 14,843 |
| Oregon | Chiloquin | 4,180 ft (1,274 m) | 755 |
| Wyoming | Lingle | 4,173 ft (1,272 m) | 403 |
| Oklahoma | Boise City | 4,167 ft (1,270 m) | 1,085 |
| Arizona | Willcox | 4,167 ft (1,270 m) | 3,757 |
| Idaho | Burley | 4,163 ft (1,269 m) | 10,464 |
| Nevada | Fernley | 4,160 ft (1,268 m) | 21,476 |
| Wyoming | Pine Haven | 4,160 ft (1,268 m) | 493 |
| Idaho | Rupert | 4,157 ft (1,267 m) | 6,082 |
| Oregon | Hines | 4,155 ft (1,266 m) | 1,545 |
| New Mexico | Floyd | 4,154 ft (1,266 m) | 110 |
| Idaho | Heyburn | 4,154 ft (1,266 m) | 3,700 |
| California | Bishop | 4,150 ft (1,265 m) | 3,746 |
| Idaho | Paul | 4,150 ft (1,265 m) | 1,195 |
| Oregon | Burns | 4,147 ft (1,264 m) | 2,794 |
| New Mexico | Texico | 4,147 ft (1,264 m) | 1,067 |
| Oregon | Altamont | 4,144 ft (1,263 m) | 19,257 |
| Oregon | Bonanza | 4,127 ft (1,258 m) | 426 |
| Arizona | Page | 4,118 ft (1,255 m) | 7,247 |
| Wyoming | Deaver | 4,108 ft (1,252 m) | 154 |
| Utah | Big Water | 4,108 ft (1,252 m) | 511 |
| Wyoming | Torrington | 4,104 ft (1,251 m) | 6,119 |
| Oregon | Klamath Falls | 4,094 ft (1,248 m) | 21,753 |
| New Mexico | Tucumcari | 4,091 ft (1,247 m) | 4,867 |
| New Mexico | Hope | 4,085 ft (1,245 m) | 106 |
| Utah | Green River | 4,078 ft (1,243 m) | 935 |
| New Mexico | Causey | 4,078 ft (1,243 m) | 98 |
| Idaho | Hazelton | 4,075 ft (1,242 m) | 803 |
| Oregon | Merrill | 4,071 ft (1,241 m) | 855 |
| New Mexico | Columbus | 4,068 ft (1,240 m) | 1,617 |
| Wyoming | Worland | 4,065 ft (1,239 m) | 4,773 |
| Oregon | Malin | 4,062 ft (1,238 m) | 832 |
| Arizona | Patagonia | 4,058 ft (1,237 m) | 781 |
| New Mexico | Hatch | 4,058 ft (1,237 m) | 1,650 |
| Oregon | Unity | 4,040 ft (1,231 m) | 70 |
| California | Tulelake | 4,035 ft (1,230 m) | 978 |
| Arizona | Douglas | 4,032 ft (1,229 m) | 17,378 |
| New Mexico | Fort Sumner | 4,032 ft (1,229 m) | 897 |
| New Mexico | San Jon | 4,032 ft (1,229 m) | 202 |
| Wyoming | Byron | 4,029 ft (1,228 m) | 562 |
| Utah | Moab | 4,026 ft (1,227 m) | 5,336 |
| Idaho | Hansen | 4,026 ft (1,227 m) | 1,086 |
| Texas | Horizon City | 4,022 ft (1,226 m) | 19,562 |
| New Mexico | Portales | 4,006 ft (1,221 m) | 11,610 |

== Cities and towns above 3,000 feet (910 m) ==
| State | City | Elevation | Population |
|---|---|---|---|
| New Mexico | Tatum | 3,999 ft (1,219 m) | 829 |
| Wyoming | Cowley | 3,990 ft (1,216 m) | 762 |
| Nevada | Lovelock | 3,980 ft (1,213 m) | 1,828 |
| California | Tehachapi | 3,970 ft (1,210 m) | 12,630 |
| Idaho | Shoshone | 3,963 ft (1,208 m) | 1,653 |
| Nevada | Fallon | 3,960 ft (1,207 m) | 8,645 |
| Arizona | Spring Valley | 3,944 ft (1,202 m) | 1143 |
| Idaho | Salmon | 3,944 ft (1,202 m) | 3,119 |
| Colorado | Sterling | 3,937 ft (1,200 m) | 13,630 |
| Idaho | Kimberly | 3,924 ft (1,196 m) | 4,626 |
| Wyoming | Dayton | 3,921 ft (1,195 m) | 822 |
| Wyoming | Clearmont | 3,917 ft (1,194 m) | 116 |
| New Mexico | Lovington | 3,911 ft (1,192 m) | 11,489 |
| Kansas | Kanorado | 3,907 ft (1,191 m) | 153 |
| New Mexico | Las Cruces | 3,900 ft (1,189 m) | 111,385 |
| Utah | Springdale | 3,898 ft (1,188 m) | 629 |
| Nebraska | Scottsbluff | 3,891 ft (1,186 m) | 14,874 |
| Wyoming | Manderson | 3,891 ft (1,186 m) | 88 |
| New Mexico | Mesilla | 3,881 ft (1,183 m) | 1,828 |
| Wyoming | Basin | 3,878 ft (1,182 m) | 1,288 |
| Montana | Helena | 3,875 ft (1,181 m) | 32,315 |
| North Carolina | Highlands | 3,855 ft (1,175 m) | 1,072 |
| Kansas | Weskan | 3,852 ft (1,174 m) | 158 |
| Wyoming | Lovell | 3,832 ft (1,168 m) | 2,243 |
| Arizona | Nogales | 3,829 ft (1,167 m) | 20,103 |
| New Mexico | Logan | 3,819 ft (1,164 m) | 979 |
| Texas | Hereford | 3,816 ft (1,163 m) | 15,370 |
| New Mexico | Anthony | 3,802 ft (1,159 m) | 9,239 |
| Arizona | Bagdad | 3,793 ft (1,156 m) | 1932 |
| Texas | Muleshoe | 3,793 ft (1,156 m) | 5,158 |
| Wyoming | Greybull | 3,789 ft (1,155 m) | 1,651 |
| New Mexico | Sunland Park | 3,789 ft (1,155 m) | 17,978 |
| Idaho | Buhl | 3,770 ft (1,149 m) | 4,558 |
| Idaho | Filer | 3,767 ft (1,148 m) | 2,738 |
| Wyoming | Ranchester | 3,763 ft (1,147 m) | 1,064 |
| Idaho | Jerome | 3,763 ft (1,147 m) | 11,994 |
| New Mexico | Virden | 3,763 ft (1,147 m) | 129 |
| Oregon | Enterprise | 3,757 ft (1,145 m) | 1,996 |
| Oregon | Long Creek | 3,754 ft (1,144 m) | 190 |
| Wyoming | Hulett | 3,747 ft (1,142 m) | 309 |
| Wyoming | Sheridan | 3,743 ft (1,141 m) | 18,737 |
| Texas | El Paso | 3,740 ft (1,140 m) | 681,728 |
| Utah | Rockville | 3,740 ft (1,140 m) | 269 |
| Idaho | Twin Falls | 3,734 ft (1,138 m) | 51,807 |
| North Carolina | Banner Elk | 3,701 ft (1,128 m) | 1,332 |
| Arizona | Oracle | 3,686 ft (1,123 m) | 3051 |
| Kansas | Goodland | 3,681 ft (1,122 m) | 4,406 |
| Texas | Dumas | 3,661 ft (1,116 m) | 14,916 |
| South Dakota | Whitewood | 3,655 ft (1,114 m) | 1,104 |
| Arizona | Duncan | 3,655 ft (1,114 m) | 788 |
| South Dakota | Spearfish | 3,648 ft (1,112 m) | 11,688 |
| Oregon | Bend | 3,623 ft (1,104 m) | 100,421 |
| New Mexico | Hobbs | 3,622 ft (1,104 m) | 39,141 |
| North Carolina | Newland | 3,609 ft (1,100 m) | 715 |
| Utah | Virgin | 3,606 ft (1,099 m) | 658 |
| Texas | Amarillo | 3,605 ft (1,099 m) | 199,371 |
| Arizona | Benson | 3,586 ft (1,093 m) | 5,105 |
| California | Mount Shasta | 3,586 ft (1,093 m) | 3,274 |
| South Dakota | Summerset | 3,579 ft (1,091 m) | 2,477 |
| New Mexico | Roswell | 3,573 ft (1,089 m) | 47,551 |
| Idaho | Gooding | 3,573 ft (1,089 m) | 3,707 |
| North Carolina | Blowing Rock | 3,566 ft (1,087 m) | 1,163 |
| Arizona | Cornville | 3,455 ft (1,053 m) | 3362 |
| Arizona | Clarkdale | 3,545 ft (1,081 m) | 4,097 |
| Texas | Canyon | 3,543 ft (1,080 m) | 13,303 |
| Oregon | Prairie City | 3,535 ft (1,077 m) | 876 |
| Texas | Levelland | 3,520 ft (1,073 m) | 13,542 |
| Arizona | Globe | 3,510 ft (1,070 m) | 7,347 |
| Montana | Belt | 3,510 ft (1,070 m) | 564 |
| Idaho | Cottonwood | 3,497 ft (1,066 m) | 822 |
| South Dakota | Black Hawk | 3,494 ft (1,065 m) | 3,057 |
| Utah | Leeds | 3,481 ft (1,061 m) | 873 |
| Arizona | Clifton | 3,478 ft (1,060 m) | 3,708 |
| New Mexico | Dexter | 3,465 ft (1,056 m) | 1,243 |
| South Dakota | Edgemont | 3,458 ft (1,054 m) | 716 |
| Oregon | Baker City | 3,451 ft (1,052 m) | 9,809 |
| South Dakota | Hot Springs | 3,448 ft (1,051 m) | 3,509 |
| New Mexico | Eunice | 3,448 ft (1,051 m) | 3,038 |
| Idaho | Wendell | 3,432 ft (1,046 m) | 2,917 |
| South Dakota | Saint Onge | 3,429 ft (1,045 m) | 112 |
| California | Weed | 3,425 ft (1,044 m) | 2,725 |
| South Dakota | Sturgis | 3,422 ft (1,043 m) | 6,796 |
| New Mexico | Hagerman | 3,422 ft (1,043 m) | 1,220 |
| Arizona | Sunflower | 3,405 ft (1,038 m) | 25 |
| Arizona | Miami | 3,402 ft (1,037 m) | 1,837 |
| Oregon | Ukiah | 3,400 ft (1,036 m) | 208 |
| Idaho | Grangeville | 3,399 ft (1,036 m) | 3,308 |
| Utah | Toquerville | 3,389 ft (1,033 m) | 1,735 |
| New Mexico | Artesia | 3,380 ft (1,030 m) | 22,836 |
| New Mexico | Lake Arthur | 3,379 ft (1,030 m) | 420 |
| California | Yucca Valley | 3,369 ft (1,027 m) | 21,726 |
| Texas | Plainview | 3,366 ft (1,026 m) | 22,194 |
| South Dakota | Oelrichs | 3,356 ft (1,023 m) | 116 |
| Oregon | Shaniko | 3,343 ft (1,019 m) | 37 |
| Oregon | Haines | 3,341 ft (1,018 m) | 422 |
| Arizona | Kingman | 3,333 ft (1,016 m) | 31,013 |
| North Carolina | Boone | 3,333 ft (1,016 m) | 19,562 |
| Montana | Great Falls | 3,330 ft (1,015 m) | 58,434 |
| Kansas | St. Francis | 3,320 ft (1,012 m) | 1,263 |
| Arizona | Cottonwood | 3,314 ft (1,010 m) | 11,990 |
| Georgia (U.S. state) | Sky Valley | 3,297 ft (1,005 m) | 482 |
| New Mexico | Carlsbad | 3,295 ft (1,004 m) | 29,810 |
| Oregon | North Powder | 3,256 ft (992 m) | 460 |
| Utah | Hurricane | 3,248 ft (990 m) | 19,074 |
| South Dakota | Pine Ridge | 3,241 ft (988 m) | 3,682 |
| Kansas | Syracuse | 3,232 ft (985 m) | 1,826 |
| Montana | Missoula | 3,209 ft (978 m) | 75,516 |
| Texas | Lubbock | 3,202 ft (976 m) | 262,611 |
| South Dakota | Rapid City | 3,202 ft (976 m) | 77,503 |
| Oregon | Lostine | 3,200 ft (975 m) | 223 |
| North Dakota | Rhame | 3,192 ft (973 m) | 165 |
| Utah | La Verkin | 3,192 ft (973 m) | 4,446 |
| California | Hesperia | 3,186 ft (971 m) | 95,750 |
| Oregon | Sisters | 3,182 ft (970 m) | 2,781 |
| Oregon | Canyon City | 3,173 ft (967 m) | 666 |
| Arizona | Camp Verde | 3,147 ft (959 m) | 11,187 |
| Idaho | Mountain Home | 3,146 ft (959 m) | 15,979 |
| Tennessee | Trade | 3,133 ft (955 m) | 812 |
| Virginia | Troutdale | 3,127 ft (953 m) | 140 |
| Montana | Billings | 3,123 ft (952 m) | 109,736 |
| Oklahoma | Guymon | 3,123 ft (952 m) | 11,442 |
| West Virginia | Davis | 3,100 ft (940 m) | 660 |
| Oregon | John Day | 3,087 ft (941 m) | 1,672 |
| Utah | Ivins | 3,081 ft (939 m) | 9,192 |
| New Mexico | Jal | 3,071 ft (936 m) | 2,117 |
| Montana | Alberton | 3,054 ft (931 m) | 446 |
| New Mexico | Loving | 3,051 ft (930 m) | 1,393 |
| South Dakota | Box Elder | 3,031 ft (924 m) | 9,683 |
| South Dakota | Belle Fourche | 3,022 ft (921 m) | 5,616 |
