= Spearfish Historic Commercial District =

- U.S. National Register of Historic Places
- U.S. Historic district
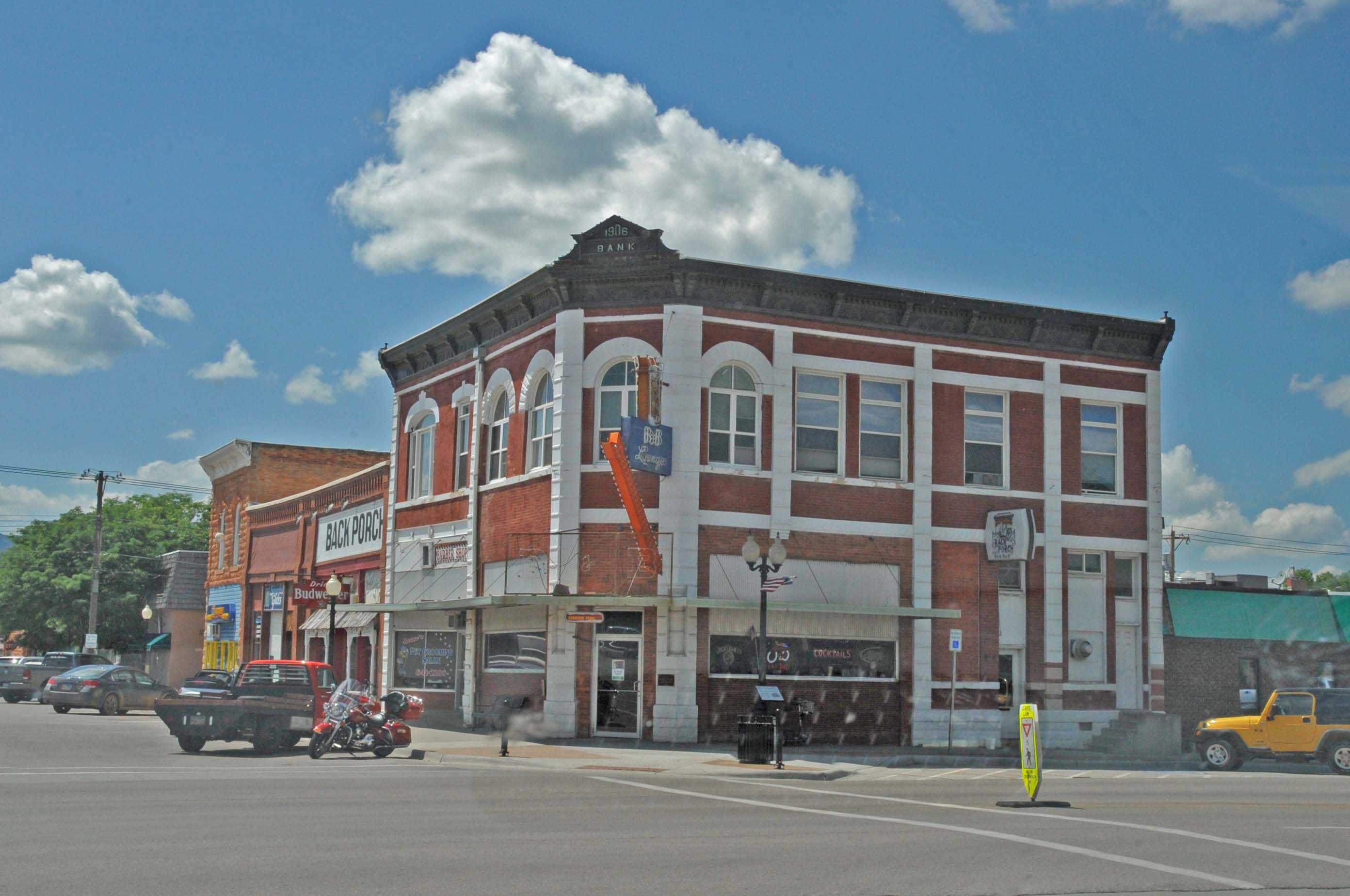
- American National Bank building, contributing property
- Interactive map of Spearfish Historic Commercial District
- Location: 544, 545, 603--645 Main St., 114--136 W. Illinois St., and 701--703 5th St., Spearfish, South Dakota
- Area: 14 acres (5.7 ha)
- Built: 1876
- Architectural style: Renaissance Revival, Romanesque Revival
- NRHP reference No.: 75001718
- Added to NRHP: June 5, 1975

The Spearfish Historic Commercial District is a historic district centered on Main Street, Spearfish, South Dakota, United States. It encompasses about 14 acres (5.7 ha) of downtown Spearfish and includes 24 commercial buildings dating back to the late 19th century. It was listed on the National Register of Historic Places in 1975.

== Description ==
The district, which is centered on Main Street, covers 14 acres (5.7 ha) and resembles an upside-down L. The southernmost point is the intersection of Main and Hudson Streets, and all corner properties are included. The district then extends northwards up the 600 block of Main Street, where it turns west at its junction with Illinois Street and extends for one block. Properties on either side of West Illinois Street are included. The district boundary then jumps north to the west side of 5th Street to include one additional property. A few neighboring buildings are independently listed and are just excluded from the district itself, including the Old Spearfish Post Office, Spearfish Filling Station, and Old Spearfish City Hall.

== History ==
Spearfish, South Dakota, was first settled in 1876, but growth was slow. Its economy and population began growing exponentially after the Chicago, Burlington and Quincy Railroad built a line into town in the 1890s. Ranchers also moved into the area to take advantage of the natural grasslands in the valley. The openings of the Black Hills Normal School in 1883 and D.C. Booth Historic National Fish Hatchery in 1896 helped grow Spearfish's educational and agricultural sectors, respectively. The oldest buildings in the historic district reflect this earliest period of growth.

== Significant contributing properties ==
The historic district includes 24 contributing properties on parts of North Main Street, Illinois Street, North 5th Street, and Hudson Street. The main architectural styles of the contributing properties are Late Victorian and Early Commercial, reflecting its turn-of-the-20th-century time period. Many of the buildings are constructed out of Sundance Sandstone quarried from the local Spearfish Formation. Sixteen of the contributing properties date to pre-1911; four were built after 1930.

- Matthews Opera House Block, 612–630 North Main Street: This block takes up half of the east side of the street and is the centerpiece of the district. Built in 1900, it is named after the theater in one of the buildings. The block is two stories tall and exhibits elements of Romanesque Revival architecture. The theater is still in operation and throughout its history has hosted a variety of shows, including vaudeville, minstrel shows, and other plays.
- Lown Mercantile Building, 701 5th Street: It was built by William Lown for use as his general store, which was run by the Lown family from 1893 to 1963. Its facade is entirely original and has been completely unaltered. The main building material was Sundance Sandstone quarried from nearby Higgins Gulch and Lookout Mountain. It is ornamented with a small tower supported by an Egyptian column on its southeast corner.
- John Wolzmuth Building, 544 North Main Street: This building is similar in construction to the Lown Mercantile Building and exemplifies Renaissance Revival architecture. Wolzmuth settled in the Black Hills in 1876 and helped fund the Black Hills Normal School. He opened Wolzmuth Hardware in Spearfish and it was open until the 1950s, at which point it became the site of Spearfish's first Safeway store.
- Stebbins–Fox Bank Building, 701 Main Street: Built in 1906, this building was originally host to the American National Bank. Its facade is a distinctive red brick with contrasting white decorative masonry.

== See also ==
- Rapid City Historic Commercial District
