= Woodmen Hall (Saint Onge, South Dakota) =

- U.S. National Register of Historic Places
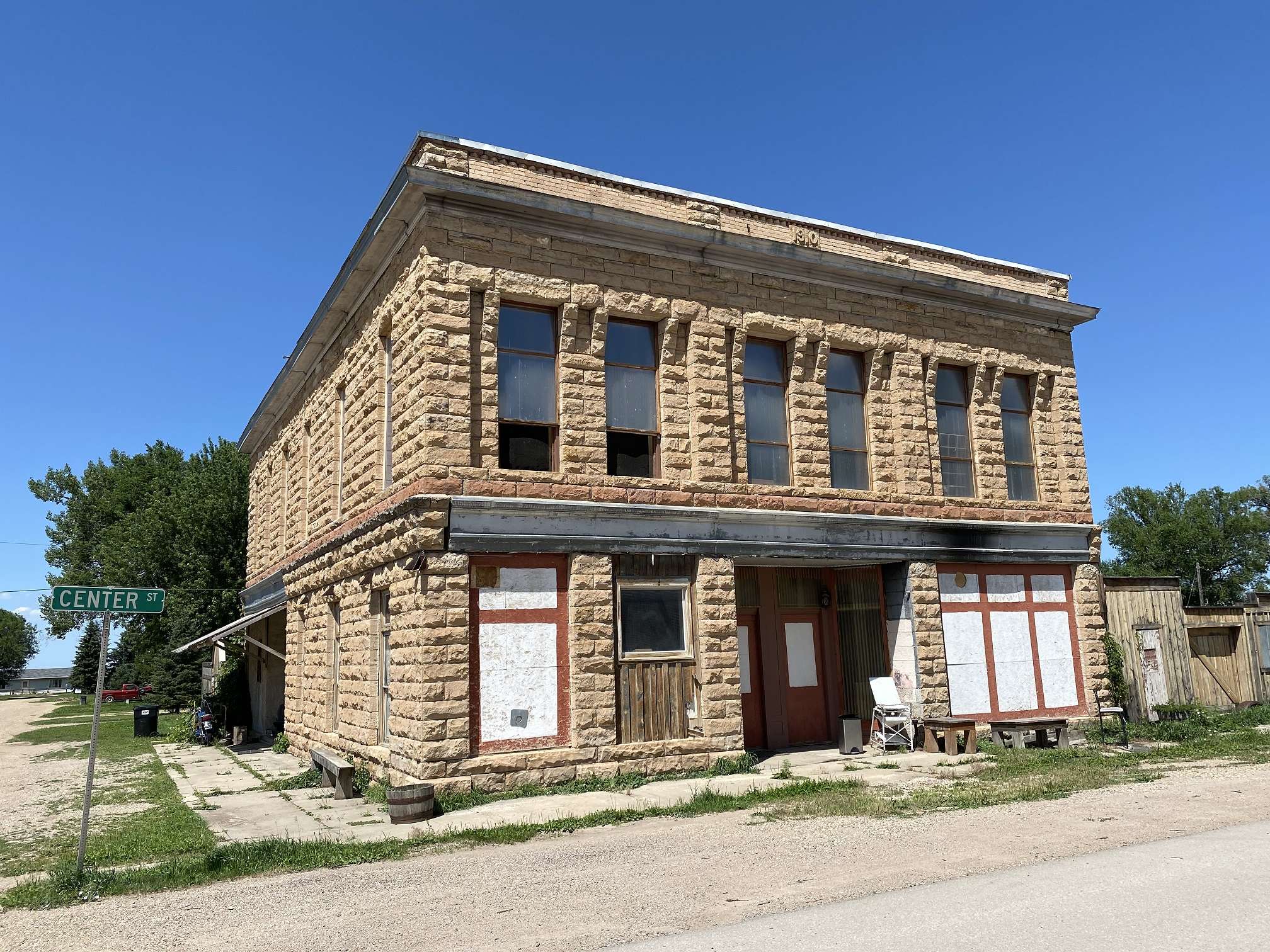

- Location within South Dakota Location within the United States
- Location: Jct. of Center and Second Sts., Saint Onge, South Dakota
- Coordinates: 44°32′49″N 103°43′12″W
- Area: less than one acre
- Architectural style: Early Commercial
- NRHP reference No.: 91001619
- Added to NRHP: November 14, 1991

Woodmen Hall is an historic Woodmen of the World building located on the corner of Center and Second streets in Saint Onge, Lawrence County, South Dakota. It was used as a meeting hall for the local Woodmen of the World lodge and other local organizations. It also housed a general store.

In 1991 it was added to the National Register of Historic Places, at which time it was vacant.
