= D.C. Booth Historic National Fish Hatchery =

- Spearfish Fisheries Center
- U.S. National Register of Historic Places
- U.S. Historic district
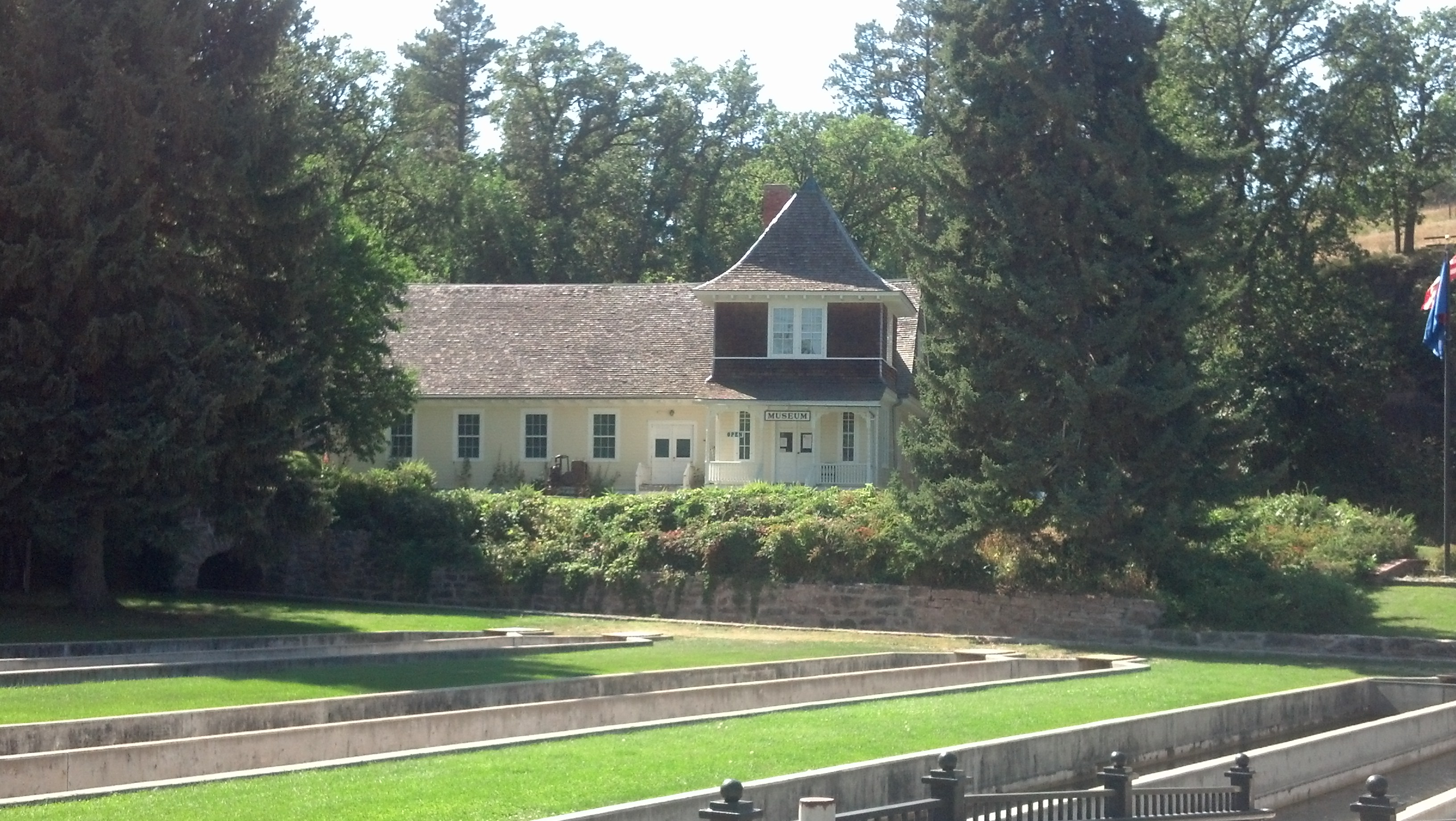
- The Von Bayer Museum at the Spearfish Fisheries Center.

- Location within South Dakota
- Nearest city: Spearfish, South Dakota
- Coordinates: 44.48121°N 103.86015°W
- Area: 10 acres (4.0 ha)
- Built: 1896
- Visitation: 155,000 (2012)
- NRHP reference No.: 78003438 (Note: The hatchery's boundaries were expanded in 1993. This expansion was added as a separate listing and was given the reference number 92000241.)
- Added to NRHP: May 19, 1978 (Note: See note 1.)

The D.C. Booth Historic National Fish Hatchery and Archives, also known as the Spearfish Fisheries Center or Spearfish Fisheries Complex and formerly known as the Spearfish National Fish Hatchery, is one of 70 fish hatcheries that were opened by the U.S. Fish and Wildlife Service as part of the National Fish Hatchery System. The hatchery was established near Spearfish, South Dakota in 1896, with the purpose of introducing and establishing populations of trout in the Black Hills of South Dakota and Wyoming. It is one of the oldest fish hatcheries in the United States and is the second-oldest in the American West. The hatchery spawns and releases about 20,000 to 30,000 rainbow trout each year. The hatchery doubles as a fisheries archive with the purpose of preserving records and early historical artifacts. It is listed on the National Register of Historic Places.

== Buildings and exhibits ==
The Von Bayer Museum of Fish Culture is located inside the original 1899 hatchery building, as well as the 10,000 square feet (930 m^{2}) Collection Management Facility, which was built in 1989. The museum houses over 185,000 artifacts of fish culture, making it the largest collection of such items in the United States. Only a few of the artifacts are on display; the rest are kept in a 5,000 square feet (460 m^{2}) storage room.

The Neo-Colonial Revival Booth House was built by D.C. Booth in 1905 as a home for himself and his family. The wooden house was built on a rusticated sandstone foundation. The house has been preserved, and tours are offered to visitors.

Fish Car No. 3 is a reproduction of a railcar that was used before the invention of refrigerated tanker trucks. For about 66 years, ten railcars like this one were used to haul trout throughout the Black Hills. The nearby ice house is a replica of the 1899 original. Once used to store blocks of ice for transporting fish and their eggs, it currently serves as the Fish Culture Hall of Fame to honor pioneers and innovators in the field of aquaculture.

The Yellowstone Boat, or U.S. Fisheries Boat #39, was used by fish hatchery workers on expeditions to Yellowstone National Park to collect trout eggs. The operation began in 1901 and ended in 1911. The boat was restored and is on display.

The Pond Gift Shop and information center is located in a restored turn-of-the-century hatchery building. The main fish viewing area includes feeding machines that visitors can operate. There is also an underwater viewing area beside the main fish area.

Two hiking trails run along the borders of the site.

== History ==
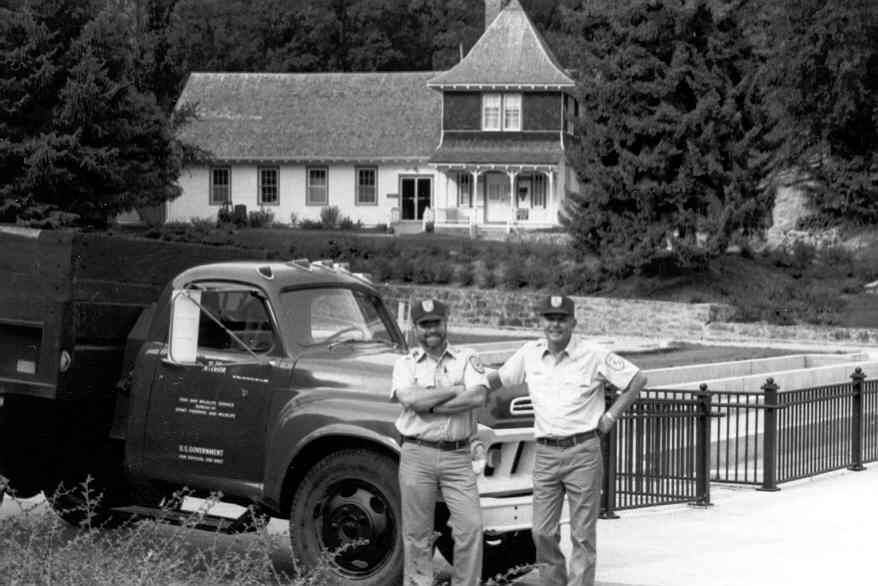
The Von Bayer Museum, 20th century.

This particular center was funded by a bill passed through Congress to create a Black Hills fish hatchery. Hector Von Bayer was sent by the United States Fish Commission to find a suitable site; Von Bayer reported back that he thought Ames Canyon, south of Spearfish, would be the best spot for the hatchery. That location was then occupied by a sawmill operated by John Johnson, but Johnson agreed to sell the land and left the area to participate in the Klondike Gold Rush. The building of the hatchery was supervised by H. A. Bush and was done mainly by John Russell. Construction was delayed by a harsh winter in 1898-1899, but the hatchery was completed by July 1899. The center opened as the Spearfish National Fish Hatchery in 1896 and was under the scope of the newly founded National Fish Hatchery System. The complex included 17 ponds and a main hatchery building; these facilities used spring water.

In late July 1899, 100,000 blackspotted trout eggs arrived to begin populating the hatchery. Dewitt Clinton Booth, the first superintendent and a New York native, traveled to the new hatchery from the Leadville National Fish Hatchery in Colorado. A few days after the eggs arrived, the area was hit by a flash flood, and all of the eggs were washed away and destroyed. Booth later added two storm channels to prevent further flooding. Booth and his employees cleaned up the grounds and finished the hatchery building. At completion, the building was able to hold a maximum of 2.5 million eggs among 48 troughs. Booth described the winter conditions at the hatchery as being "very favorable for incubation." The first trout were released in Little Spearfish Creek and Whitewood Creek in April 1900. Together, the creeks took 25,000 blackspotted trout and brook trout. One year later, Loch Leven brown trout were stocked in Nemo, and that fall, rainbow trout were stocked in Spearfish Creek and Iron Creek. In 1904, another flood occurred, causing further damage to the grounds. As a result, Booth built ten-foot-high bulkheads. Booth built a home for himself and his family in 1905 and stayed at the hatchery for 34 years.

The hatchery closed in 1983 after budget cuts forced the closure of the site. The hatchery, still managed by the US Fish and Wildlife Service, still allowed visitors but could not continue operations. The hatchery reopened in 1989 as the D.C. Booth Historic National Fish Hatchery, in honor of Booth, and after forming new partnerships. The hatchery was renovated in 1995.

In August 2013, it was announced that the hatchery would shut down on October 1, 2013, after the U.S. Fish and Wildlife Service issued a nationwide hatchery shutdown due to priority being given to other programs and insufficient funding. The announcement was met with opposition by U.S. Senator Tim Johnson and U.S. Representative Kristi Noem, both from South Dakota; as well as Spearfish Mayor Dana Boke. Due to public efforts to keep the hatchery open, its closure was indefinitely suspended in September 2013, with its operations allowed to continue through the end of Fiscal Year 2014 on September 30, 2014.

== Tourism and economic impact ==
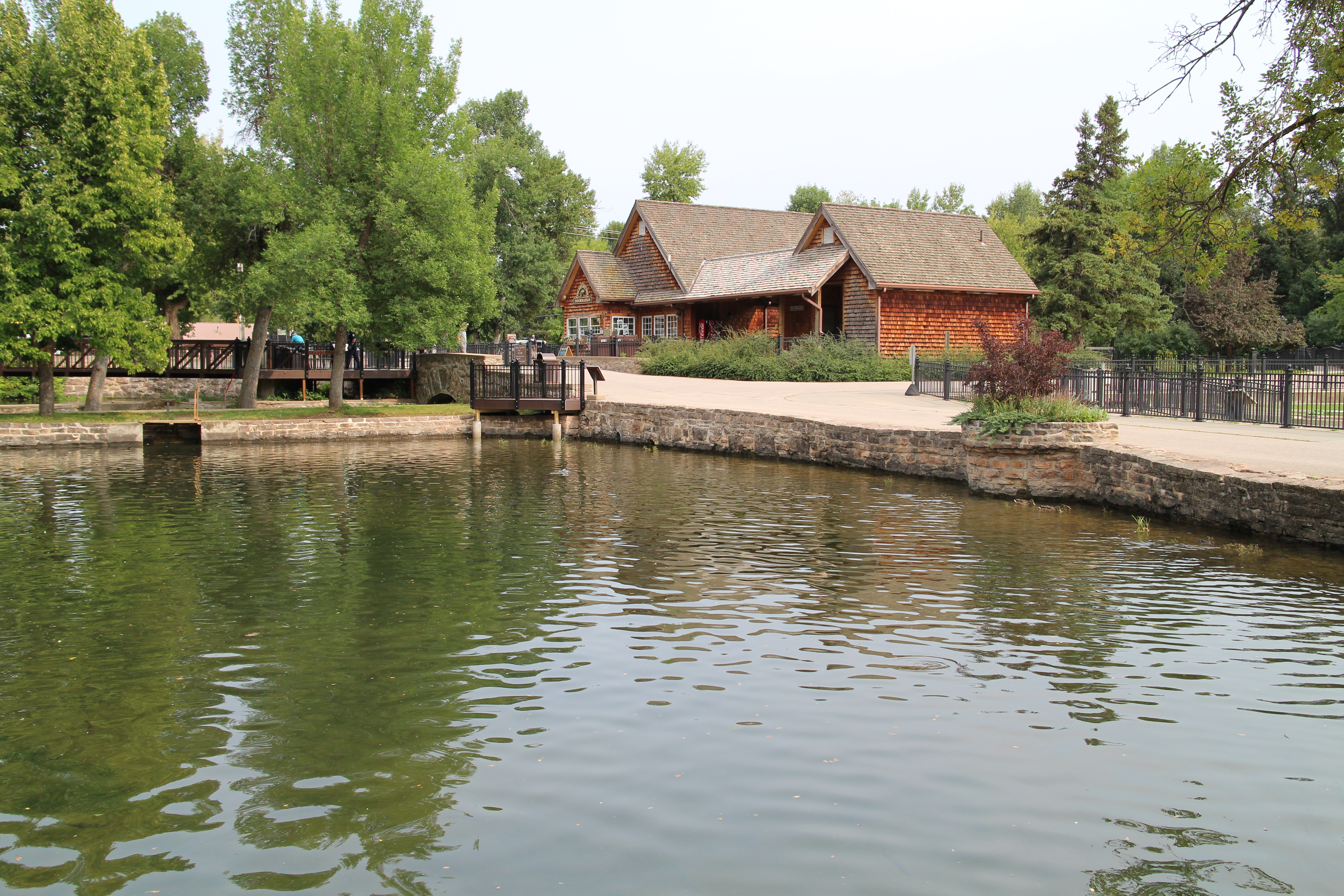
The rainbow trout pond and visitor center

According to a 2007 study by Black Hills State University, the hatchery's operations generate $2.1 million in revenue for local businesses annually. Approximately $1 million is spent in Spearfish by nonresidents who visited the town because of the hatchery. The Booth Society, a nonprofit group that aims to preserve the hatchery, estimated that in 2011, every tax dollar that supported the hatchery generated $28 for the local community. The hatchery has an annual average of 155,000 visitors.

== See also ==
- List of National Fish Hatcheries in the United States
- National Register of Historic Places listings in Lawrence County, South Dakota
