= Frawley Ranch =

- Frawley Historic Ranch
- U.S. National Register of Historic Places
- U.S. National Historic Landmark District
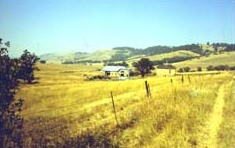
- Distant view of the ranch

- Location within South Dakota Location within the United States
- Nearest city: Spearfish, South Dakota
- Coordinates: 44°28′30″N 103°42′38″W
- Area: 4,750 acres (19.2 km^{2})
- Built: 1880
- Architectural style: Classical Revival
- NRHP reference No.: 74001893

Significant dates
- Added to NRHP: December 31, 1974
- Designated NHLD: May 5, 1977

The Frawley Ranch is an historic ranch in Lawrence County, South Dakota, near Spearfish, South Dakota. Henry Frawley developed what became the largest and most successful cattle ranch in western South Dakota by purchasing lands that had failed as smaller homesteading parcels. The property was declared a National Historic Landmark in 1977.

== History ==
Patrick Henry Frawley was born March 13, 1851, in Washington County, New York to Thomas and Honora (Hogan) Frawley who had immigrated from County Limerick, Ireland. Frawley was graduated from the University of Wisconsin law school in 1876. In 1877 the Indian lands of the Black Hills District was opened to settlers and Frawley traveled by train to Bismarck, North Dakota and then by wagon train to Deadwood, Dakota Territory, where he set up a law practice. He was successful from the start and in 1879 joined with a partner, Edward L. Kohen, as Frawley and Kohen law firm. In 1894 John P. Laffey and a James Frawley joined to form Frawley and Laffey. In 1896 James moved to Nome, Alaska and in 1903 E.L. Frawley joined to form Frawley and Frawley. The firm represented John Fitzgerald (Fitzgerald-Mallory Construction Company), also from County Limerick, in railroad construction from Deadwood to Edgemont, the Burlington and Missouri River Railroad, the American National Bank of Deadwood and various mining companies. During this time Frawley bought land and mining interests in the area.

On July 22, 1890, Henry married Cristina Anderson, sole heir to Centennial Farm that lay between Deadwood and Spearfish. They had three children Henry James, William C., and Honora. Frawley began to buy unsuccessful farms in the valley totaling more than 3000 acres, and by 1913 had over 4,783 acres from different farms referred to as the Upper, Lower, Middle, and East farms, that included the Anderson dairy with a brick barn, and a school. They bred Belgian and Percheron draft horses, as well as Hereford cattle.

After what seemed to be a bad business deal Henry Frawley had a breakdown in 1920 and went to Nebraska for treatment where he died in 1927. From 1920 Cristina ran the ranch as the matriarch until she died in 1942. Henry James Frawley, Sr. and the families of William and Honora Frawley jointly ran the ranch until Henry bought out the others in 1960. In 1962 Henry James Frawley, Jr. had completed college and joined his parents in running the ranch. In 1968 the state of South Dakota used eminent domain to gain a right-of-way for Interstate 90 through the northern pastures of the ranch. Tunnels were built so that livestock could cross under the interstate.

== Current ==
Denver, Colorado developer Daryll Propp and his partner, Mike Kreke, who was head of the retail giant Douglas Holding (purchased by CVC), bought the property in 1998 as Elkhorn Ridge partners and started commercial development along the area of I-90 at exit 17. With a 30 million dollar investment the property contains an RV park, home sites, and a golf course. 2,800 acres was set aside as a conservation easement in perpetuity, through the South Dakota Agricultural Conservation Easement Program (ACEP), a division of the United States Department of Agriculture. Water and sewer was extended from Spearfish and the city limits expanded east of the golf course. Elkhorn Ridge announced a back-nine extension project was to start 2014 with an unknown completion date. The golf course is completed as of 2016.

== See also ==
- List of National Historic Landmarks in South Dakota
- National Register of Historic Places listings in Lawrence County, South Dakota
