= James A. Corbin House =

Historic house in South Dakota, United States

- U.S. National Register of Historic Places
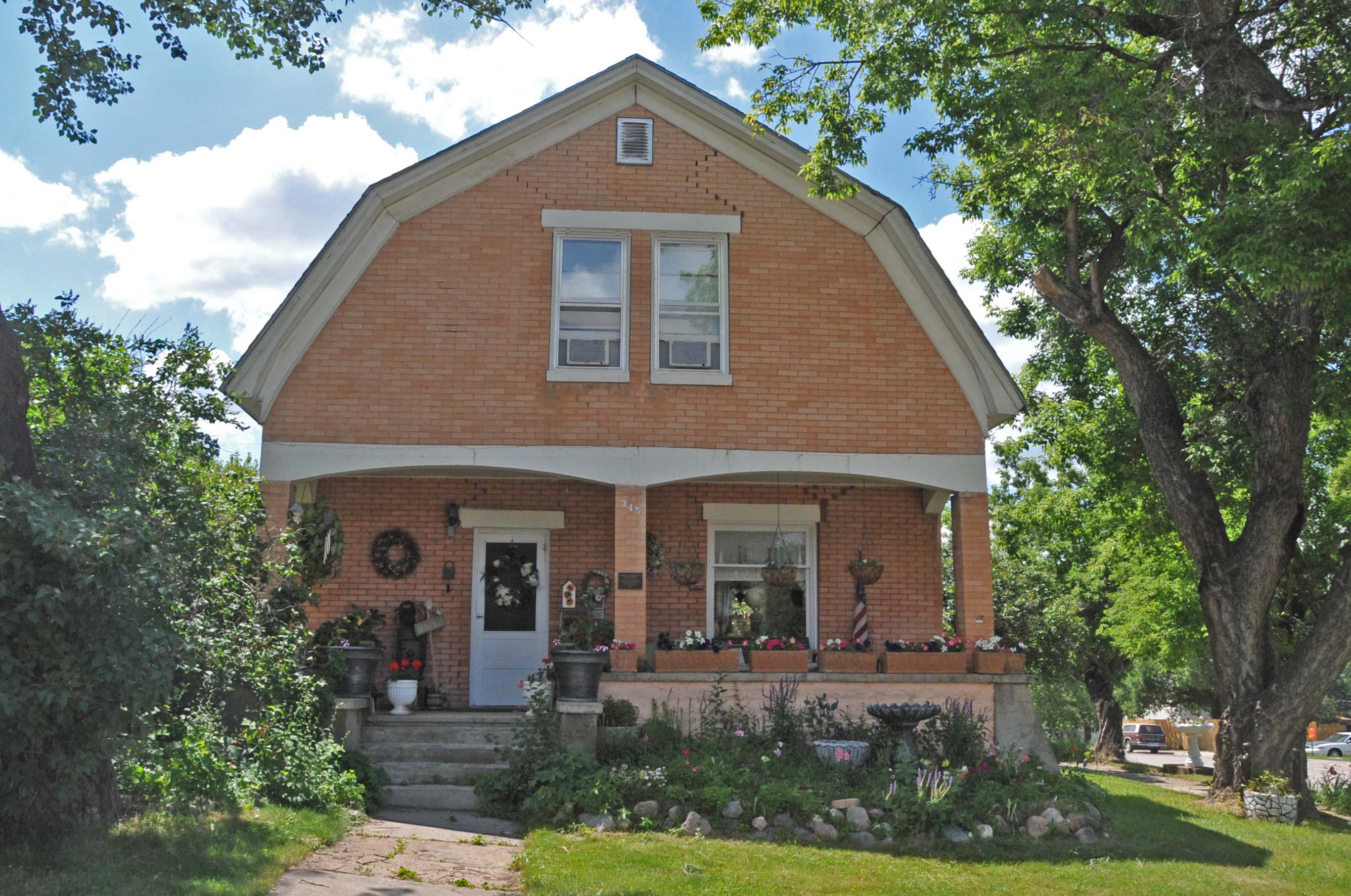

- Location within South Dakota Location within the United States
- Location: 345 Main St., Spearfish, South Dakota
- Coordinates: 44°29′11″N 103°51′28″W
- Area: less than one acre
- Built: 1918
- Architectural style: Late 19th and Early 20th Century American Movements
- NRHP reference No.: 90001651
- Added to NRHP: October 25, 1990

The James A. Corbin House, at 345 Main St. in Spearfish, South Dakota, was built in 1918. It was listed on the National Register of Historic Places in 1990.

It is a two-story vernacular-style house. Nonetheless, it was deemed significant as "a good example of vernacular domestic housing in Spearfish, South Dakota, in the early 20th Century. Using a mixture of stylistic components, it is one of the few brick or brick-faced houses in the city."
