= Mount Theodore Roosevelt Monument =

- U.S. National Register of Historic Places
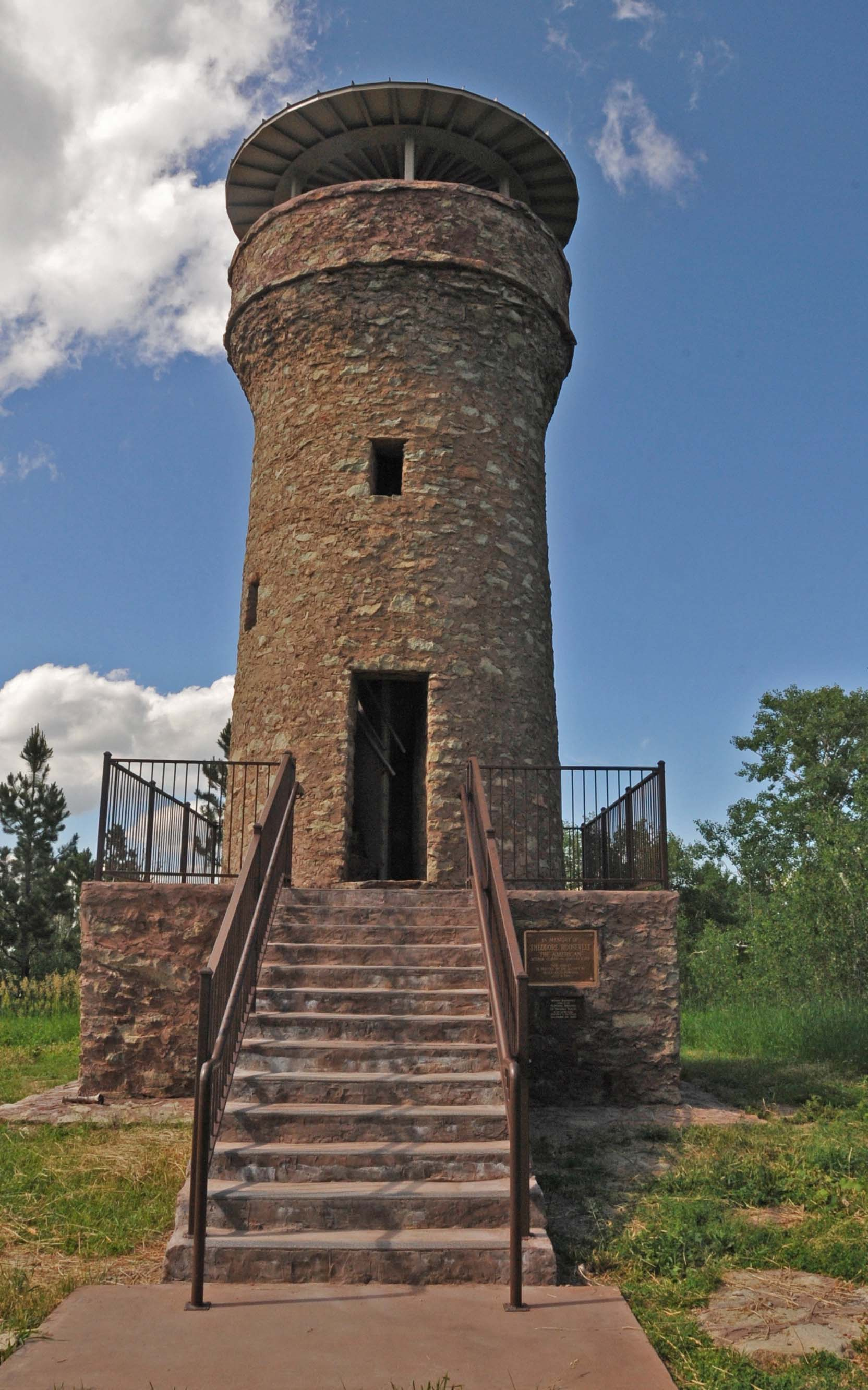

- Location within South Dakota Location within the United States
- Location: Black Hills National Forest
- Nearest city: Deadwood, South Dakota
- Coordinates: 44°23′53″N 103°45′33″W
- Area: 0.2 acres (0.081 ha)
- Built: May to July 4, 1919
- NRHP reference No.: 05001457
- Added to NRHP: December 22, 2005

Mount Theodore Roosevelt Monument, also known as the Roosevelt Friendship Monument or Friendship Tower, located in the Black Hills National Forest on the outskirts of Deadwood, Lawrence County, South Dakota, is a 31-foot stone tower, including the six-foot-high platform, honoring Theodore Roosevelt. It was the first tribute to the president's memory and was dedicated July 4, 1919.

== History ==
Theodore Roosevelt was a deputy sheriff in Medora, North Dakota in 1884. While looking for a group of horse thieves he met up with Seth Bullock who was the Sheriff of Deadwood. The two became lifelong friends and when Roosevelt died Bullock wanted to erect a monument for his friend. The Society of the Black Hills Pioneers provided financial support to build a tower and it was dedicated on July 4, 1919. In 1966, the Society donated the tower to the United States Forest Service.

== Restoration ==
In 2010 a restoration project was completed that included foundation stabilization and stone repair. Stairs were added leading up to the platform and handrails on the stairs and the platform. The project was funded by the American Recovery and Reinvestment Act (ARRA). The Deadwood Historic Preservation Commission, the Black Hills Parks and Forest Association, and the Black Hills National Forest were all involved.
