= Brownsville, South Dakota =

Brownsville, South Dakota Avalon, Esther's Place, Anderson's Place
- Unincorporated community
- Location within South Dakota Location within the United States
- Coordinates: 44°16′31″N 103°41′40″W
- Country: United States
- State: South Dakota
- County: Lawrence
- Founded by: David Brown
- Named after: founder
- Elevation: 5,505 ft (1,678 m)
- Time zone: UTC-7 (MST)
  - Summer (DST): UTC-6 (MDT)
- Area code: 605
- GNIS feature ID: 1265621

Brownsville, also known as Avalon, Esther's Place, and Anderson's Place, is an unincorporated community in Lawrence County, South Dakota, United States. The town was originally a lumber camp, and it was named for contractor David Brown. It is the nearest community to John Hill Ranch-Keltomaki, which is listed on the U.S. National Register of Historic Places.

== Etymology ==
The town was formerly called Avalon, but the name was changed to Brownsville in honor of David Brown, a local logging contractor and the town's founder. In modern times, the town is more often referred to as Esther's Place or Anderson's Place.

== History ==
Brownsville was created as a lumber camp to supply timber for the Homestake Mine and its buildings and fuel for the boilers. Its founder and contractor, David Brown, also supervised the town's production for several years and supplied much of the equipment. The town was originally called Avalon, but the name was later changed to honor its founder. In 1880, 400 men worked in the town, and the number later grew. The Black Hills & Fort Pierre Railroad built a narrow-gauge spur to the town.

In 1882, 600 men were employed in Brownsville. A telephone line was planned; it would stretch from Lead to Brownsville, and then on to Rochford, Tigerville, Hill City, and Custer. Once a week, a dance class was held, and 40 teachers were employed by the public school. By September, the Homestake Company had moved its terminus to Hagginsville. In 1883, a fire broke out in the Hood & Scott Sawmill one-half mile to the northeast. The fire destroyed the mill and killed eleven employees. In 1894, a boarding house was built.

Today, Brownsville is a small tourist stop consisting of a store, gas station, and tavern.

== Geography ==
Brownsville is located in the Black Hills region of Lawrence County. It is situated on the west side of U.S. 385 and is approximately 6.5 miles south of the ghost town Pluma. Lead is located to the north. The NRHP-listed John Hill Ranch-Keltomaki is located near the town site.
