= Tomahawk Lake Country Club =

- U.S. National Register of Historic Places
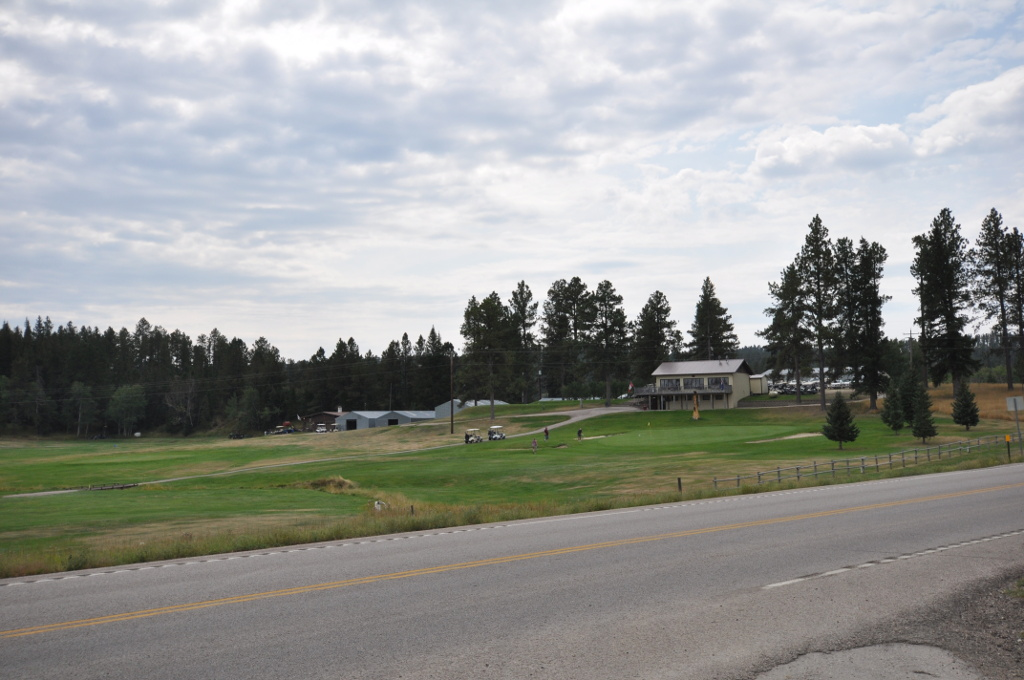

- Location within South Dakota Location within the United States
- Location: US 385, Deadwood, South Dakota
- Coordinates: 44.2859617°N 103.6919119°W
- Area: 82 acres (33 ha)
- Built: 1934
- Architect: Hughes, Lawrence
- NRHP reference No.: 05001191
- Added to NRHP: October 26, 2005

The Tomahawk Lake Country Club is a country club in Deadwood, South Dakota. Built in 1934, it was listed on the National Register of Historic Places in 2005.

It has a nine-hole par-3 golf course designed in the 1930s by Lawrence Hughes in the 1930s, who also designed the Thunderbird Country Club in Rancho Mirage, California.
