= John Hill–Keltomaki Ranch =

- John Hill Ranch-Keltomaki
- U.S. National Register of Historic Places
- Location within South Dakota Location within the United States
- Nearest city: Brownsville, South Dakota
- Coordinates: 44°17′11″N 103°39′11″W
- Area: 4 acres (1.6 ha)
- Built: 1925
- Built by: Hill, John, Jr.
- MPS: Architecture of Finnish Settlement TR
- NRHP reference No.: 85003489
- Added to NRHP: November 13, 1985

The John Hill–Keltomaki Ranch near Brownsville, South Dakota, United States, at the original Keltomake Ranch site, includes work from 1925. It includes buildings built by John Hill Jr. The site, with five contributing buildings and two contributing structures, on 4 acres (1.6 ha), was listed on the National Register of Historic Places in 1985.

The ranch site "is an excellent example of Finnish folk building traditions coexisting with American vernacular architecture. In addition, the barn is an extremely fine example of Finnish-Scandinavian building techniques."

His father John Hill, Sr. immigrated from Lapua, Finland.
