= Arthur Hewes House =

Historic house in South Dakota, United States

- U.S. National Register of Historic Places
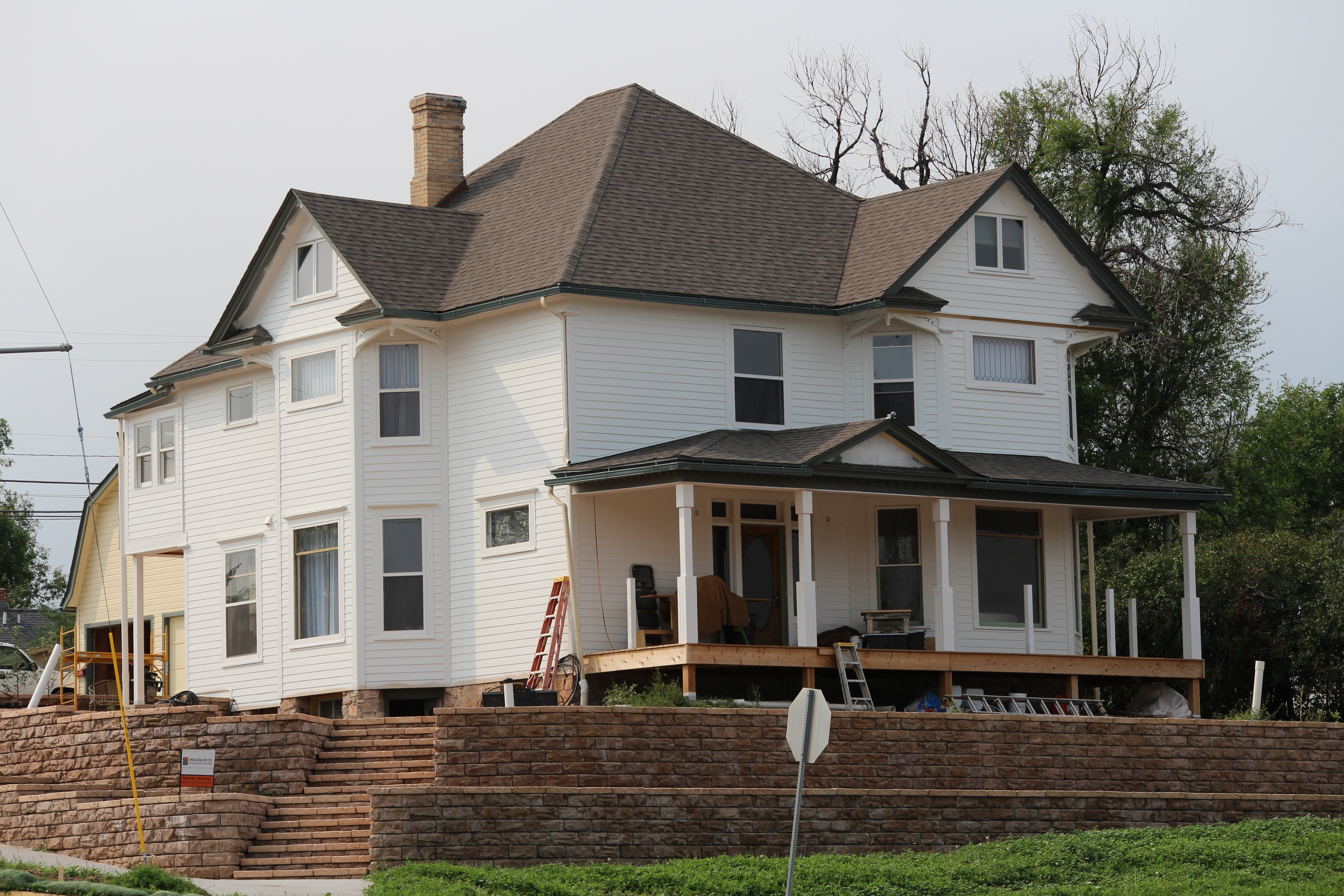
- The house in 2018

- Location within South Dakota Location within the United States
- Location: 811 St. Joe, Spearfish, South Dakota
- Coordinates: 44°29′29″N 103°52′07″W
- Area: less than one acre
- Built: 1905
- Architectural style: Queen Anne
- NRHP reference No.: 90001650
- Added to NRHP: October 25, 1990

The Arthur Hewes House, at 811 St. Joe in Spearfish, South Dakota, was built in 1905. It was listed on the National Register of Historic Places in 1990.

It is a two-and-a-half-story wood-frame house on a stone foundation. It was deemed notable as "a good example of the Queen Anne style of architecture as popular in Spearfish, South Dakota, during the late 19th and early 20th centuries."

Arthur Hewes operated a general store in Spearfish from 1903 to 1921 or later.
