= Walsh Barn =

- U.S. National Register of Historic Places
- Location within South Dakota Location within the United States
- Nearest city: Spearfish, South Dakota
- Coordinates: 44°34′47″N 103°59′19″W
- Area: less than one acre
- Built: 1907
- Built by: Walsh, Maurice
- Architectural style: Grundscheier Barn
- NRHP reference No.: 03000500
- Added to NRHP: May 30, 2003

The Walsh Barn on the Lausser-Hayes Ranch near Spearfish, South Dakota was built in 1907. It was listed on the National Register of Historic Places in 2003. It is located 0.5 miles (0.80 km) west of the junction of Upper Redwater Rd. and 104th Ave.

It is built of sandstone quarried from the Redwater River, which runs nearby. It was built "in 1907 by Irish immigrant Maurice Walsh, his wife Mary and their daughters Mary age 16, Nellie age 14, Florence age 10, and Margaret age 7 at the time." Walsh came to the Black Hills area during the 1876 gold rush.

It has features similar to German Grundscheier barns of the eastern Midwest and Eastern states.
