= Spearfish Filling Station =

- U.S. National Register of Historic Places
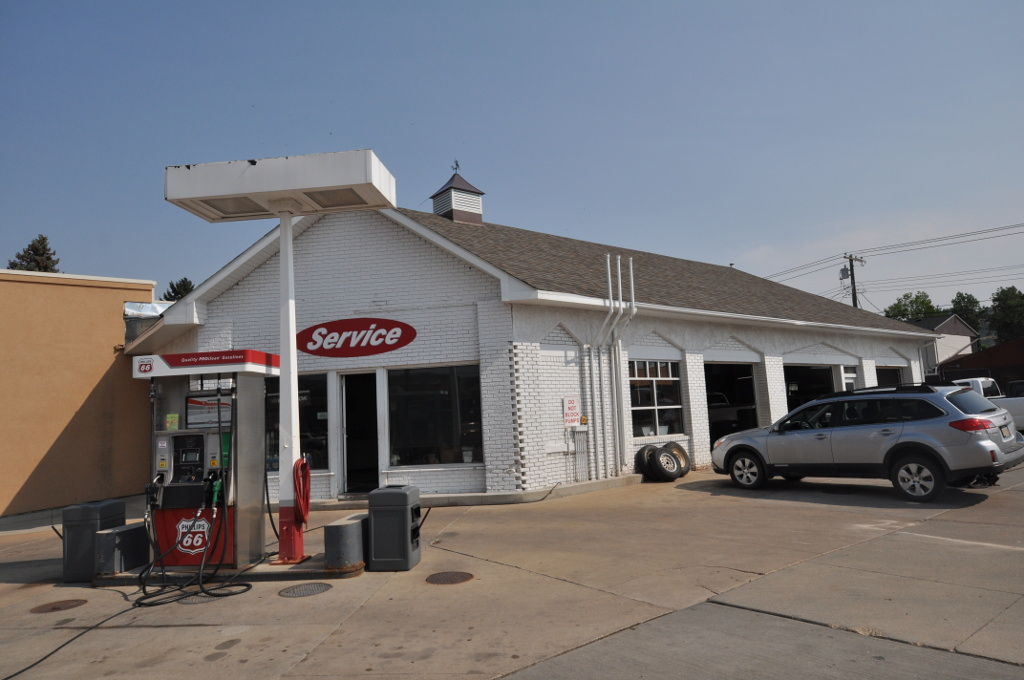

- Location within South Dakota Location within the United States
- Location: 706 Main St., Spearfish, South Dakota
- Coordinates: 44°29′25″N 103°51′30″W
- Area: less than one acre
- Built: 1923
- NRHP reference No.: 88000567
- Added to NRHP: May 16, 1988

The Spearfish Filling Station, located at 706 Main St. in Spearfish, South Dakota, was built in 1923. It was listed on the National Register of Historic Places in 1988.

It is a one-story building with five bays: an angled office bay, a shop bay, and three car service bays. It was built by Alfred J. Sheep, a rancher and businessman, as the first gas station in the community, with the service bays added in 1927. Sheep operated the station until his death in 1957.
