= Saint Onge, South Dakota =

- Census-designated place
- Location in South Dakota Location in the United States
- Coordinates: 44°32′45″N 103°43′11″W
- Country: United States
- State: South Dakota
- County: Lawrence

Area
  - Total: 1.34 sq mi (3.48 km^{2})
  - Land: 1.34 sq mi (3.48 km^{2})
  - Water: 0 sq mi (0.00 km^{2})
- Elevation: 3,432 ft (1,046 m)

Population (2020)
  - Total: 170
  - Density: 126.4/sq mi (48.82/km^{2})
- Time zone: UTC-6 (Mountain Standard Time(MST))
  - Summer (DST): UTC-5 (MST)
- 57779: 57779
- FIPS code: 46-57260
- GNIS feature ID: 2628850

Saint Onge (pronounced "saynt AHNJ'") is an unincorporated community and census-designated place (CDP) in Lawrence County, South Dakota, United States. As of the 2020 census, the population was 170.

== History ==
Furios Building, St. Onge, 1987

Saint Onge was laid out in 1881. The community was named for Henry St. Onge, a pioneer settler. A post office called Saint Onge has been in operation since 1881. Saint Onge has been assigned the ZIP code of 57779.

== Geography ==
St. Onge is in northeastern Lawrence County, along South Dakota Highway 34, which leads northwest 12 miles (19 km) to Belle Fourche and southeast 7 miles (11 km) to Interstate 90 at Whitewood. Spearfish, the largest community in the county, is 12 miles (19 km) to the southwest.

According to the U.S. Census Bureau, the St. Onge CDP has an area of 1.4 square miles (3.5 km^{2}), all land. False Bottom Creek forms the western edge of the community, and its tributary Dry Creek forms the northeastern edge. False Bottom Creek flows northwest to the Redwater River, which in turn is a tributary of the Belle Fourche River, flowing east to the Missouri.

== Demographics ==
Historical population
Census	Pop.	Note	%±
2020	170		—
U.S. Decennial Census

== Education ==
It is in the Spearfish School District 40-2.
