= Nemo, South Dakota =

- Unincorporated community
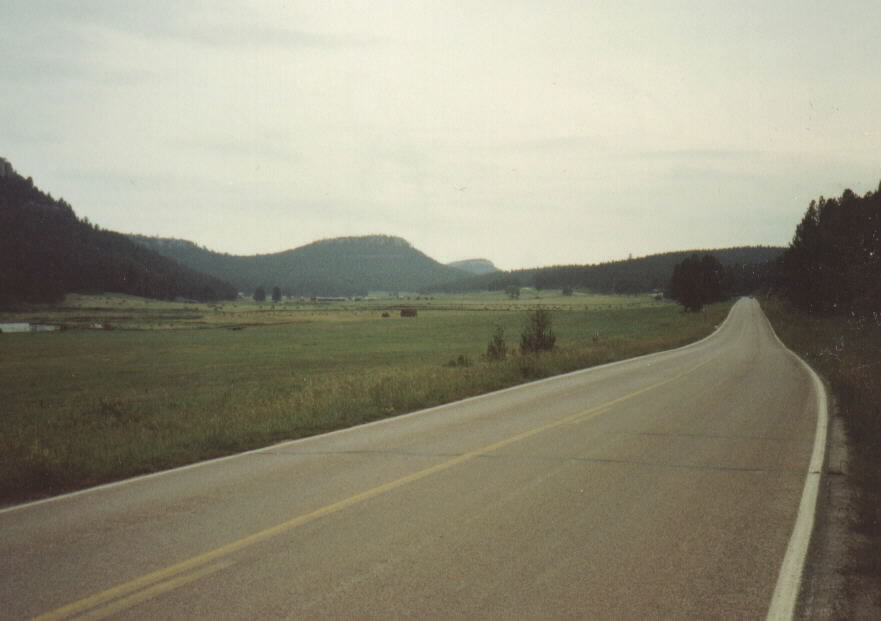
- Road near Nemo

- Location in South Dakota Location in the United States
- Coordinates: 44°11′39″N 103°30′16″W
- Country: United States
- State: South Dakota
- County: Lawrence

Population (2010)
  - Total: 546
- Time zone: UTC-7 (Mountain (MST))
  - Summer (DST): UTC-6 (MDT)
- ZIP codes: 57759

Nemo is an unincorporated community in Lawrence County, South Dakota, United States. The population was 546 at the 2010 census. Nemo has been assigned the ZIP code of 57759.

According to the Federal Writers' Project, the origin of the name Nemo is obscure.

== Demographics ==
=== 2010 census ===
As of the census of 2010, there were 546 people, 164 households, and 109 families in the town. There were 260 housing units. The racial makeup of the town was 81.7% White, 3.3% African American, 11.7% Native American, 0.4% Asian, 0.2% Pacific Islander, 0.9% from other races, and 1.8% from two or more races. Hispanic or Latino of any race were 4.4% of the population.

There were 164 households, of which 14.0% had children under the age of 18 living with them, 63.4% were married couples living together, 0.6% had a female householder with no husband present, 2.4% had a male householder with no wife present, and 33.5% were non-families. 29.3% of all households were made up of individuals. The average household size was 2.01 and the average family size was 2.41.

The median age in the town was 33.3 years. 15.0% of residents were under that age of 18; 35.6% of residents were between the ages of 18 and 24; 7.1% were from 25 to 44; 28.6% were from 45 to 64; and 13.7% were 65 years of age or older. The gender makeup of the town was 60.1% male and 39.9% female.

As of 2010 the median income for a household in the town was $78,226, and the median income for a family was $79,758. Males had a median income of $20,135 versus $32,188 for females. The per capita income for the town was $24,646. 39.5% of the population were below the poverty line, including 4.3% of those under age 18.

== Climate ==
Nemo has a humid continental climate (Köppen Dfb).

Climate data for Nemo (RAWS), South Dakota, 1994–2020 normals: 4644ft (1415m)
| Month | Jan | Feb | Mar | Apr | May | Jun | Jul | Aug | Sep | Oct | Nov | Dec | Year |
|---|---|---|---|---|---|---|---|---|---|---|---|---|---|
| Mean daily maximum °F (°C) | 39.2 (4.0) | 39.1 (3.9) | 46.9 (8.3) | 53.4 (11.9) | 62.3 (16.8) | 73.7 (23.2) | 82.0 (27.8) | 81.0 (27.2) | 72.3 (22.4) | 57.7 (14.3) | 47.7 (8.7) | 39.4 (4.1) | 57.9 (14.4) |
| Daily mean °F (°C) | 24.6 (−4.1) | 24.7 (−4.1) | 32.2 (0.1) | 39.3 (4.1) | 48.5 (9.2) | 58.6 (14.8) | 66.0 (18.9) | 64.2 (17.9) | 55.3 (12.9) | 42.7 (5.9) | 32.8 (0.4) | 25.0 (−3.9) | 42.8 (6.0) |
| Mean daily minimum °F (°C) | 10.0 (−12.2) | 10.0 (−12.2) | 17.6 (−8.0) | 25.2 (−3.8) | 34.6 (1.4) | 43.6 (6.4) | 50.1 (10.1) | 47.4 (8.6) | 38.2 (3.4) | 27.6 (−2.4) | 17.9 (−7.8) | 10.6 (−11.9) | 27.7 (−2.4) |
Source: XMACIS2
