= Whitewood, South Dakota =

- City
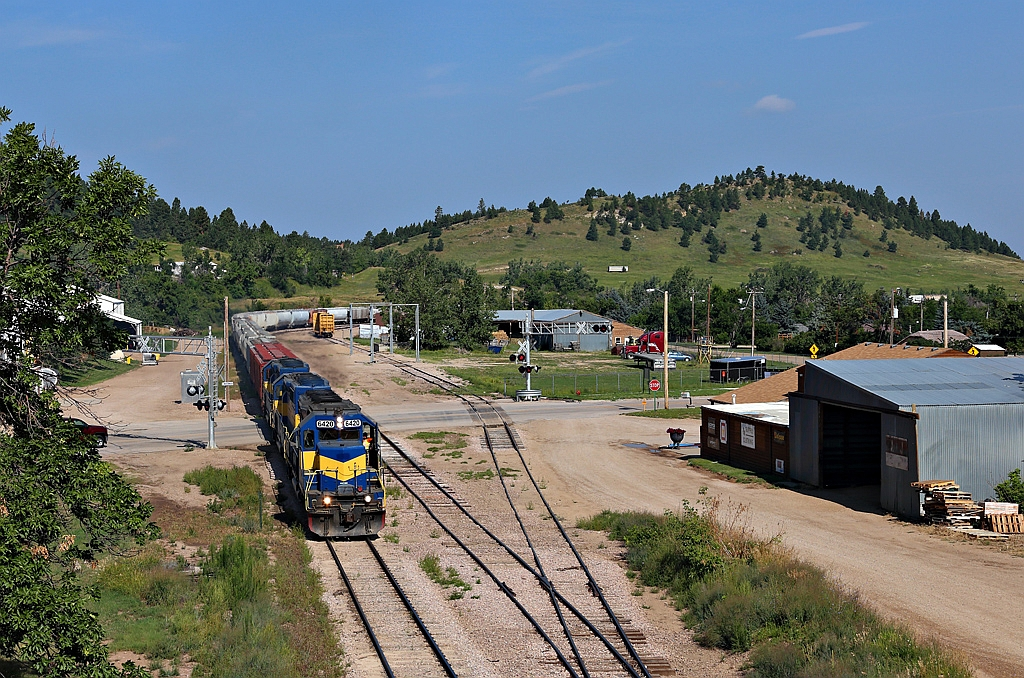
- Railroad in Whitewood

- Location in Lawrence County and the state of South Dakota
- Coordinates: 44°27′41″N 103°38′21″W
- Country: United States
- State: South Dakota
- County: Lawrence
- Incorporated: 1888

Area
  - Total: 0.64 sq mi (1.65 km^{2})
  - Land: 0.64 sq mi (1.65 km^{2})
  - Water: 0 sq mi (0.00 km^{2})
- Elevation: 3,655 ft (1,114 m)

Population (2020)
  - Total: 879
  - Density: 1,379.0/sq mi (532.43/km^{2})
- Time zone: UTC-7 (Mountain (MST))
  - Summer (DST): UTC-6 (MDT)
- ZIP code: 57793
- Area code: 605
- FIPS code: 46-71580
- GNIS feature ID: 1262710
- Website: cityofwhitewood.org

Whitewood is a city in Lawrence County, South Dakota, United States. The population was 879 at the 2020 census.

== History ==
Whitewood was platted in 1888 when the Chicago and North Western Railway was extended to that point. It took its name from nearby Whitewood Creek.

== Geography ==
According to the United States Census Bureau, the city has a total area of 0.64 square miles (1.66 km^{2}), all land.

Whitewood has been assigned the ZIP code 57793 and the FIPS place code 71580.

== Demographics ==
Historical population
Census	Pop.	Note	%±
1890	443		—
1900	311		−29.8%
1910	390		25.4%
1920	339		−13.1%
1930	392		15.6%
1940	267		−31.9%
1950	304		13.9%
1960	470		54.6%
1970	689		46.6%
1980	821		19.2%
1990	891		8.5%
2000	844		−5.3%
2010	927		9.8%
2020	879		−5.2%
U.S. Decennial Census

=== 2020 census ===
As of the 2020 census, Whitewood had a population of 879. The median age was 43.6 years; 20.1% of residents were under the age of 18 and 18.4% were 65 years of age or older. For every 100 females there were 107.8 males, and for every 100 females age 18 and over there were 102.9 males age 18 and over.

0.0% of residents lived in urban areas, while 100.0% lived in rural areas.

There were 402 households in Whitewood, of which 25.9% had children under the age of 18 living in them. Of all households, 45.0% were married-couple households, 20.1% were households with a male householder and no spouse or partner present, and 23.4% were households with a female householder and no spouse or partner present. About 29.6% of all households were made up of individuals and 13.2% had someone living alone who was 65 years of age or older.

There were 420 housing units, of which 4.3% were vacant. The homeowner vacancy rate was 2.4% and the rental vacancy rate was 0.9%.

Racial composition as of the 2020 census
Race	Number	Percent
White	798	90.8%
Black or African American	7	0.8%
American Indian and Alaska Native	15	1.7%
Asian	2	0.2%
Native Hawaiian and Other Pacific Islander	0	0.0%
Some other race	10	1.1%
Two or more races	47	5.3%
Hispanic or Latino (of any race)	34	3.9%

=== 2010 census ===
At the 2010 census, there were 927 people, 374 households, and 232 families living in the city. The population density was 1,448.4 inhabitants per square mile (559.2/km^{2}). There were 392 housing units at an average density of 612.5 per square mile (236.5/km^{2}). The racial makup of the city was 91.9% White, 0.8% African American, 3.7% Native American, 0.1% Asian, 0.3% from other races, and 3.2% from two or more races. Hispanic or Latino of any race were 2.5%.

Of the 374 households, 33.4% had children under the age of 18 living with them, 46.8% were married couples living together, 8.3% had a female householder with no husband present, 7.0% had a male householder with no wife present, and 38.0% were non-families. 30.7% of households were one person and 12.3% were one person aged 65 or older. The average household size was 2.44 and the average family size was 3.05.

The median age was 38.8 years. 26.9% of residents were under the age of 18; 6.5% were between the ages of 18 and 24; 23.7% were from 25 to 44; 28.8% were from 45 to 64; and 14.1% were 65 or older. The gender makeup of the city was 50.6% male and 49.4% female.

=== 2000 census ===
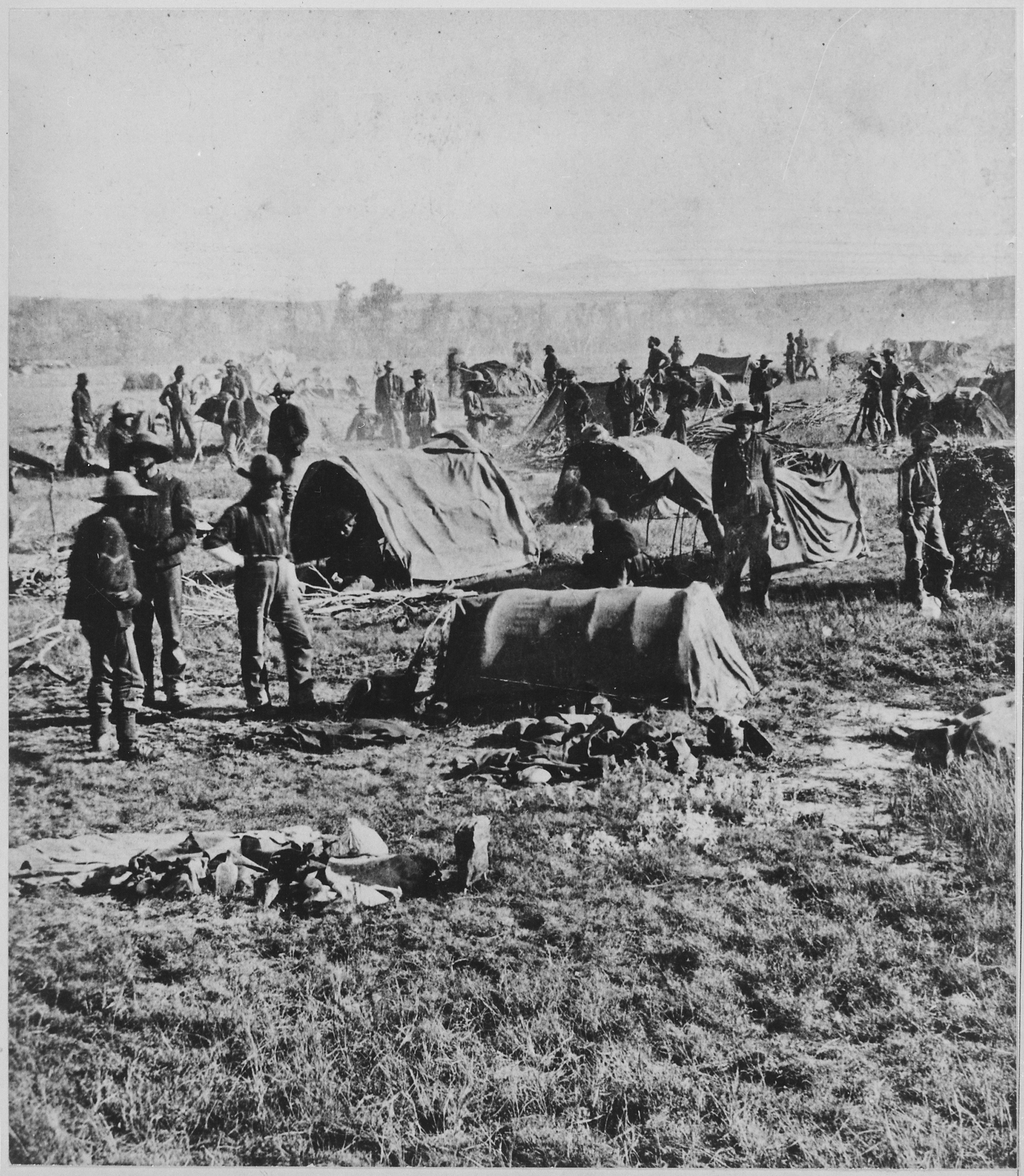
"General Crook's headquarters in the field at Whitewood (Dak. Terr.). On starvation march 1876."

At the 2000 census, there were 844 people, 330 households, and 224 families living in the city. The population density was 1,303.6 inhabitants per square mile (503.3/km^{2}). There were 356 housing units at an average density of 549.9 per square mile (212.3/km^{2}). The racial makup of the city was 95.62% White, 2.61% Native American, 0.24% from other races, and 1.54% from two or more races. Hispanic or Latino of any race were 2.13%.

Of the 330 households, 35.8% had children under the age of 18 living with them, 53.9% were married couples living together, 10.6% had a female householder with no husband present, and 32.1% were non-families. 26.1% of households were one person and 11.5% were one person aged 65 or older. The average household size was 2.52 and the average family size was 3.00.

The age distribution was 27.4% under the age of 18, 8.6% from 18 to 24, 29.7% from 25 to 44, 19.7% from 45 to 64, and 14.6% 65 or older. The median age was 36 years. For every 100 females, there were 101.4 males. For every 100 females age 18 and over, there were 92.8 males.

The median household income was $29,297 and the median family income was $30,859. Males had a median income of $25,347 versus $16,597 for females. The per capita income for the city was $12,247. About 15.6% of families and 17.8% of the population were below the poverty line, including 24.5% of those under age 18 and 7.2% of those age 65 or over.

== Education ==
It is in the Meade School District 46-1.

== See also ==
- List of cities in South Dakota
