= New Jelm, Wyoming =

Unincorporated community in Albany County, Wyoming, United States

- Unincorporated community
- Location within the state of Wyoming New Jelm (the United States)
- Coordinates: 41°04′55″N 106°00′36″W
- Country: United States
- State: Wyoming
- County: Albany
- Time zone: UTC-7 (Mountain (MST))
  - Summer (DST): UTC-6 (MDT)
- ZIP codes: 82058
- GNIS feature ID: 1601688

New Jelm is an unincorporated community along the Laramie River in Albany County, Wyoming, United States. It is located along Wyoming Highway 10 and mostly within the census-designated place of Woods Landing-Jelm.
