= List of unincorporated communities in Wyoming =

This is a list of unincorporated communities in the U.S. state of Wyoming, listed by county. This may include disincorporated communities, towns with no incorporated status, and ghost towns.

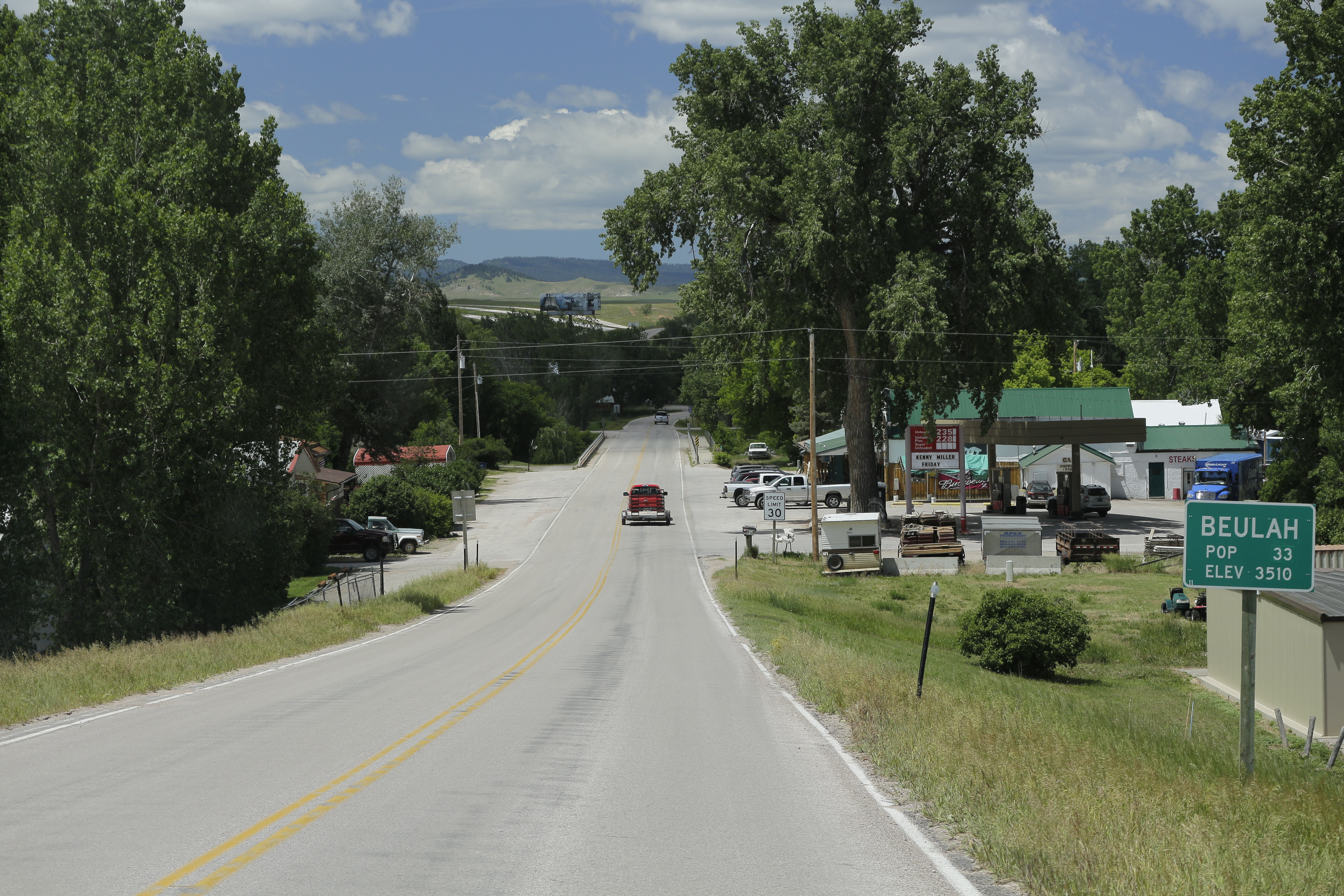
Beulah in Crook County

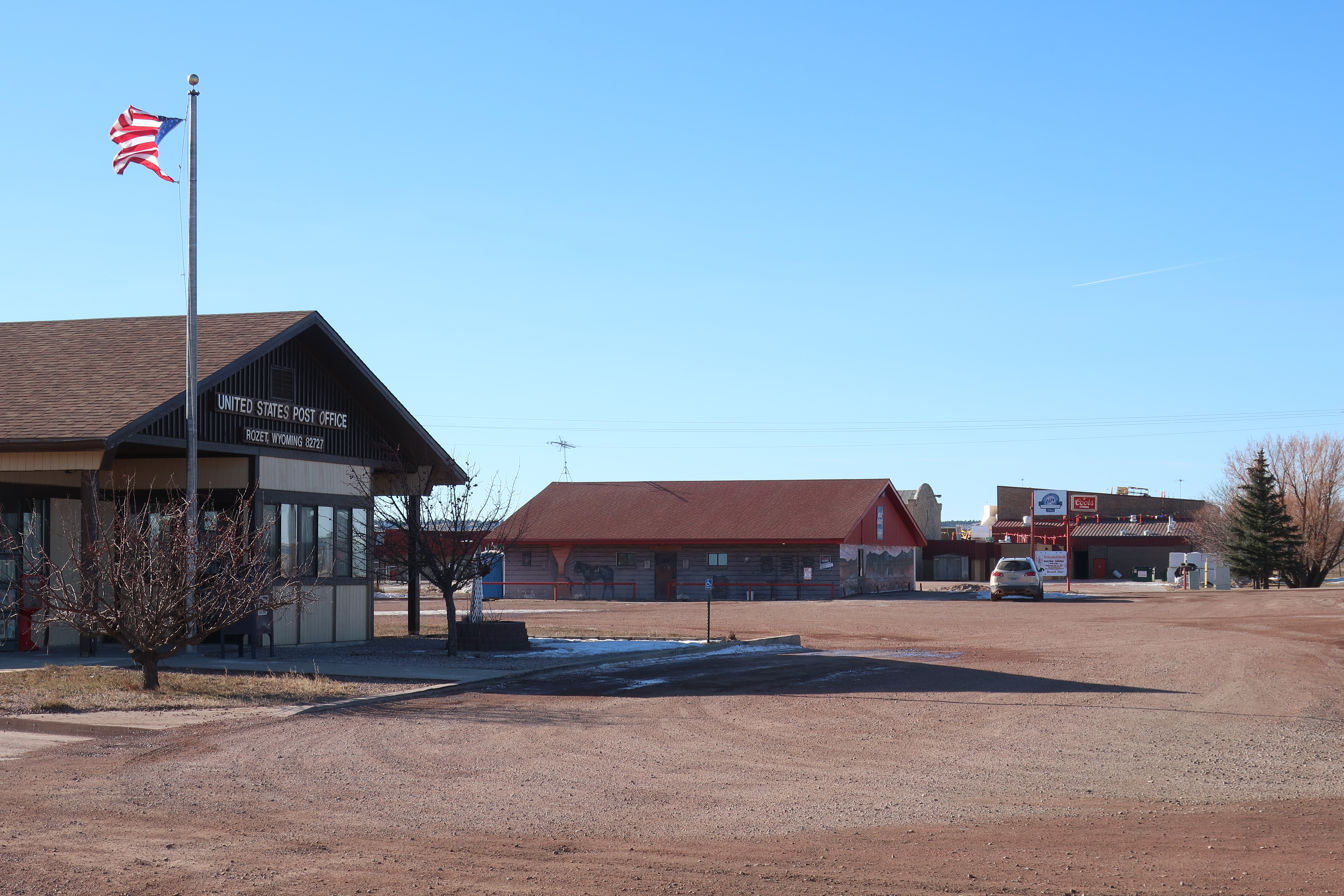
Rozet in Campbell County

- Albany County (Bosler, Buford, Garrett, Tie Siding)
- Big Horn County (Emblem, Kane, Otto, Shell)
- Campbell County (Recluse, Rozet, Weston)
- Carbon County (Arlington, Savery, Walcott)
- Converse County (Bill, Orin, Shawnee)
- Crook County (Aladdin, Alva, Beulah)
- Fremont County (Kinnear, Kotey Place, Lysite, Miner's Delight, St. Stephens, South Pass City)
- Goshen County (Jay Em)
- Hot Springs County (Gebo)
- Johnson County (Linch, Saddlestring)
- Laramie County (Carpenter, Granite, Horse Creek, Hillsdale, Meriden)
- Lincoln County (Freedom [partly in Idaho], Frontier)
- Natrona County (Arminto, Hiland, Natrona)
- Park County (Wapiti, Yanceys)
- Platte County (6 unincorporated communities)
- Sheridan County (Banner, Leiter, Wolf, Wyarno)
- Sublette County (New Fork)
- Sweetwater County (Blairtown, Bryan)
- Teton County (Kelly, Moose, Moran)
- Uinta County (Bear River City, Millburne, Piedmont)
- Weston County (Four Corners)

== See also ==
- List of municipalities in Wyoming
- List of census-designated places in Wyoming
