= Jelm Mountain =

Mountain in Albany County, Wyoming, United States

- Location within Wyoming Location within the United States

Highest point
- Elevation: 9,656 ft (2,943 m)
- Prominence: 1,566 ft (477 m)
- Coordinates: 41°05′50″N 105°58′36″W

Geography
- Location: Albany County, Wyoming

Jelm Mountain (elevation: 9,656 feet (2,943 m)) is located in the Albany County in the U.S. state of Wyoming.

The nearest settlement is Woods Landing-Jelm. Its summit is the site of the Wyoming Infrared Observatory.

== Access ==
An unpaved road, which originally served as a fire access road, leads to the summit from Wyoming Highway 10, at the southwestern bottom of the mountain.

== Athletic competitions ==
The Jelm Mountain Race, during which runners ascend and descend the mountain, is held every year.

== See also ==
- List of mountain peaks of Wyoming
