= Wyoming Highway 10 =

State highway in Albany County, Wyoming, United States

Wyoming Highway 10
- Jelm Mountain Road
- WYO 10 highlighted in red

Route information
- Maintained by WYDOT
- Length: 9.117 mi (14.672 km)

Major junctions
- South end: CR 103 at the Colorado state line near Wyocolo
- North end: WYO 230 in Woods Landing-Jelm

Location
- Country: United States
- State: Wyoming
- Counties: Albany

Highway system
- Wyoming State Highway System; Interstate; US; State
← WYO 789	→ WYO 11

Wyoming Highway 10 (WYO 10), also known as Jelm Mountain Road, is a 9.117-mile (14.672 km) north-south state highway in southwestern Albany County, Wyoming, United States, that connects the north end of Larimer County's County Road 103 (CR 103) at the Colorado state line with Wyoming Highway 230 (WYO 230) in Woods Landing-Jelm. It is the lowest numbered highway in the Wyoming Highway system.

== Route description ==
WYO 10 begins at a cattle guard at the north end of Larimer County CR 103 at the Colorado-Wyoming state line, roughly 8.5 miles (13.7 km) east of the uninincorporated communities of Wyocolo and Mountain Home. (CR 103 heads south as gravel road along the eastern bank of the Laramie River to end at Colorado State Highway 14, east of Chambers Lake, the headwater of the Laramie River.)

From its southern terminus, WYO 10 proceeds northerly as an asphalt-paved two-lane road for the entirety of its length. Just under one mile (1.6 km) along its route, WYO 10 connects with the east end of Boswell Road (also known as Mountain Home Road) at a T intersection at the Boswell Ranch. (Boswell Road heads westerly toward Wyocolo and Mountain Home via [briefly] the northern edge of Colorado.)

North of Boswell Ranch, WYO 10 diverges easterly from the Laramie River for approximately 4.5 miles (7.2 km) until it reaches the unincorporated community of Jelm on the southern edge of the census-designated place (CDP) of Woods Landing-Jelm. (Jelm straddles the Larmie River.) Thereafter, WYO 10 becomes the eastern border of the CDP for the rest of its route.

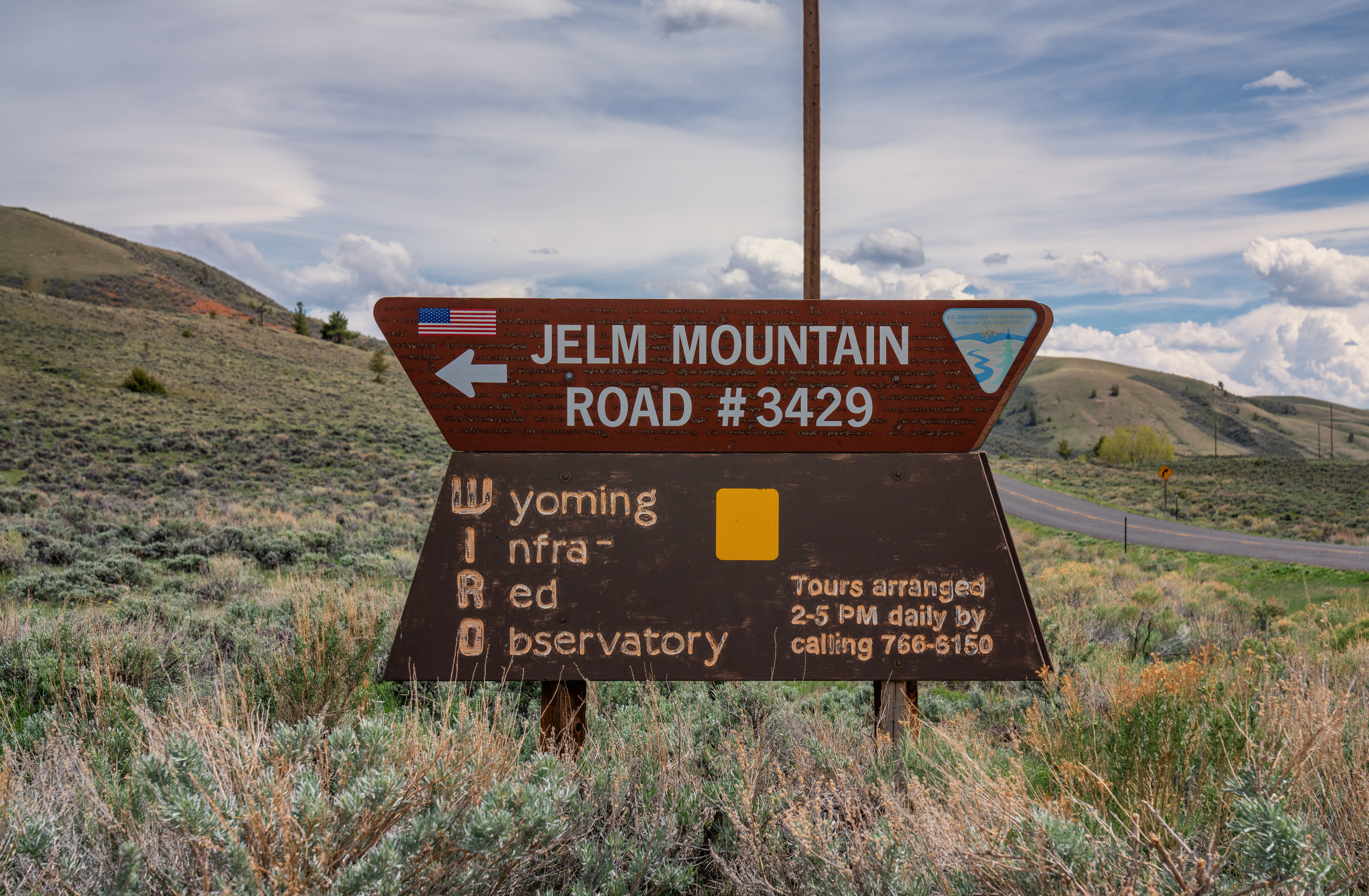
Directional sign for Jelm Mountain Road and the Wyoming Infrared Observatory along WYO 10, May 2023

Just under one mile (1.6 km) after arriving at Jelm, WYO 10 reaches a junction with the west end of Jelm Mountain Road (also known as Jelm Mountain Lookout Road) at another T intersection. (Jelm Mountain Road heads east, then north towards and to end at the Wyoming Infrared Observatory [WIRO], also known as the Jelm Mountain Observatory. [WIRO is an astronomical observatory owned and operated by the University of Wyoming at the summit of Jelm Mountain.])

WYO 10 then continues north for nearly two and a half miles (4.0 km) before crossing the Laramie River and promptly reaching its northern terminus at WYO 230 at a T-intersection. (WYO 230 heads north towards Laramie and Cheyenne and south towards Mountain Home and Walden [in Colorado].)

== Major intersections ==
Actual mileposts increase from north to south.

The entire route is in Albany County.

Location	mi	km	Destinations	Notes
	0.000	0.000	CR 103 south – SH 14 (Colorado)	Continuation south beyond southern terminus; gravel road
	0.000	0.000	Colorado-Wyoming state line (southern terminus)	
	0.917	1.476	Boswell Rd / Mountain Home Rd west – Wyocolo, Mountain Home	T intersection; gravel road
Woods Landing-Jelm	5.917	9.522	Jelm Mountain Rd / Jelm Mountain Lookout Rd east – Wyoming Infrared Observatory	T intersection; dirt road
Woods Landing-Jelm	8.337	13.417	Bridge over the Laramie River	
Woods Landing-Jelm	9.117	14.672	WYO 230 north (Rivers Road) – Laramie, Cheyenne WYO 230 south (Rivers Road) – Mountain Home, Walden (Colorado)	Northern terminus; T intersection
1.000 mi = 1.609 km; 1.000 km = 0.621 mi

== See also ==
- List of state highways in Wyoming
