= Fox Park, Wyoming =

- Census-designated place
- Location in Albany County and the state of Wyoming
- Coordinates: 41°04′48″N 106°09′12″W
- Country: United States
- State: Wyoming
- County: Albany

Area
  - Total: 1.0 sq mi (2.6 km^{2})
  - Land: 1.0 sq mi (2.6 km^{2})
  - Water: 0 sq mi (0 km^{2})
- Elevation: 9,062 ft (2,762 m)

Population (2010)
  - Total: 22
  - Density: 22/sq mi (8.5/km^{2})
- Time zone: UTC-7 (Mountain (MST))
  - Summer (DST): UTC-6 (MDT)
- ZIP Code: 82070
- Area code: 307
- FIPS code: 56-29390
- GNIS feature ID: 2629265

Fox Park is a census-designated place (CDP) in Albany County, Wyoming, United States. The population was 22 at the 2010 census.

== Geography ==
According to the United States Census Bureau, the CDP has a total area of 1.0 square mile (28.5 km^{2}), all land.

The CDP is located entirely within the Medicine Bow National Forest.

=== Climate ===
Fox Park experiences a subarctic climate (Köppen climate classification Dfc) due to its elevation. Winters are long and cold, with highs usually remaining at or below freezing, and lows often dropping below zero. Summers are refreshingly warm, but with lows still dropping to freezing. Snowfall is very heavy, averaging 180 inches per year, mostly falling between October and May, but snow during the months of September and June is not rare, and usually happens every couple of years. Usually no month of the year is frost free. Fox Park is the highest community in the state of Wyoming, at an elevation of 9,062 ft, as well as one of the coldest settlements.

Climate data for Fox Park
Month	Jan	Feb	Mar	Apr	May	Jun	Jul	Aug	Sep	Oct	Nov	Dec	Year
Mean daily maximum °F (°C)	26.3 (−3.2)	29.3 (−1.5)	33.9 (1.1)	42.5 (5.8)	53.5 (11.9)	65.3 (18.5)	72.3 (22.4)	70 (21)	62.8 (17.1)	51.9 (11.1)	36.1 (2.3)	28.7 (−1.8)	47.7 (8.7)
Daily mean °F (°C)	15.9 (−8.9)	17.8 (−7.9)	21.8 (−5.7)	30.5 (−0.8)	40 (4)	49.2 (9.6)	54.8 (12.7)	53 (12)	46.3 (7.9)	37.3 (2.9)	24.7 (−4.1)	18.1 (−7.7)	34.1 (1.2)
Mean daily minimum °F (°C)	5.4 (−14.8)	6.3 (−14.3)	9.7 (−12.4)	18.5 (−7.5)	26.4 (−3.1)	33.1 (0.6)	37.3 (2.9)	35.9 (2.2)	29.7 (−1.3)	22.7 (−5.2)	13.2 (−10.4)	7.5 (−13.6)	20.5 (−6.4)
Average precipitation inches (mm)	1.51 (38)	1.11 (28)	1.37 (35)	1.41 (36)	1.45 (37)	1.57 (40)	1.53 (39)	1.60 (41)	1.23 (31)	0.97 (25)	1.13 (29)	1.26 (32)	16.14 (411)
Average snowfall inches (cm)	28.6 (73)	21.9 (56)	26.9 (68)	25.3 (64)	11.2 (28)	1.8 (4.6)	0 (0)	0.1 (0.25)	4.4 (11)	10.8 (27)	22.3 (57)	26.8 (68)	180.1 (456.85)

== Education ==
Public education in the community of Fox Park is provided by Albany County School District #1.

== See also ==
- Laramie, North Park and Western Railroad
