= Binford =

Binford may refer to one of the following:

== People ==
- Binford (surname)
- Binford Carter (1943–2014), American folk artist

== Places ==
- Binford, Mississippi, a village in Monroe County, Mississippi
- Binford, North Dakota, a city in Griggs County, North Dakota
- Binford, Wyoming

== Fictional ==
- Binford Tools, a fictional tool manufacturer that appears in the sitcom Home Improvement, as well as the movie Toy Story, and the sitcom Last Man Standing. In the movie Miracle, one of the hockey players in the locker room scene is seen wearing a Binford Tools t-shirt. The Joker can be seen pulling a wrench out of a box of tools bearing the Binford brand in the episode "The Laughing Fish" in Batman: The Animated Series. Also, a red Binford toolbox appears in Toy Story. Binford also appears as one of the TV brands in the movie Crazy on the Outside, featuring Tim Allen.

== See also ==
- Benford (disambiguation)
