= Bosler, Wyoming =

Unincorporated community in Wyoming, United States

- Unincorporated community
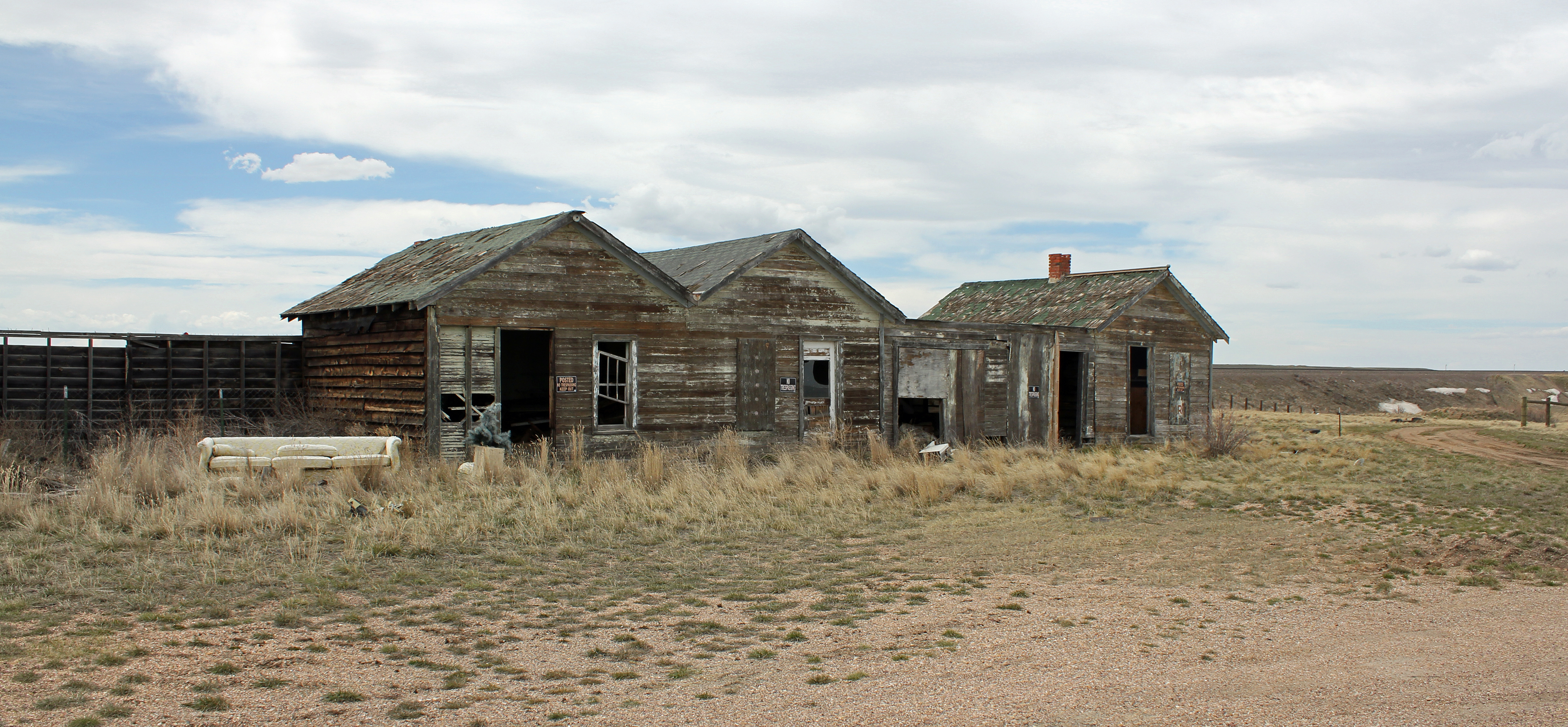
- Old buildings along U.S. Route 30 in Bosler.

- Location within the state of Wyoming Bosler, Wyoming (the United States)
- Coordinates: 41°34′34″N 105°41′43″W
- Country: United States
- State: Wyoming
- County: Albany
- Elevation: 7,080 ft (2,160 m)
- Time zone: UTC-7 (Mountain (MST))
  - Summer (DST): UTC-6 (MDT)
- ZIP codes: 82051
- GNIS feature ID: 1585790

Bosler is an unincorporated community in central Albany County, Wyoming, United States, along the Laramie River. It lies along the concurrent U.S. Routes 30 and 287 north of the city of Laramie, the county seat of Albany County.

Public education in the community of Bosler is provided by Albany County School District #1.

In the Jalan Crossland song, "Bosler," Crossland describes his idyllic dreams of life in Bosler, presumably while living in a distant city. Among other things, Crossland describes the simple pleasures of watching children play in the streets and living in the simple trailer-life.
