= Keystone, Wyoming =

Unincorporated community in Wyoming, United States

- Unincorporated community
- Location within the state of Wyoming Keystone, Wyoming (the United States)
- Coordinates: 41°10′05″N 106°15′31″W
- Country: United States
- State: Wyoming
- County: Albany
- Time zone: UTC-7 (Mountain (MST))
  - Summer (DST): UTC-6 (MDT)
- ZIP codes: 82058
- GNIS feature ID: 1600709

Keystone is an unincorporated community in Albany County, Wyoming, United States.

The population of Keystone was recorded as 374 in the 1930 census but declined to 169 by 1940. In 1950, Keystone had a population of 120. Keystone once featured a gold mine with a shaft 365 feet deep.
