= Lookout, Wyoming =

- Former railroad station
- Location within the state of Wyoming Lookout, Wyoming (the United States)
- Coordinates: 41°39′57″N 105°48′08″W
- Country: United States
- State: Wyoming
- County: Albany
- Time zone: UTC-7 (Mountain (MST))
  - Summer (DST): UTC-6 (MDT)
- ZIP codes: 82058
- GNIS feature ID: 1591001

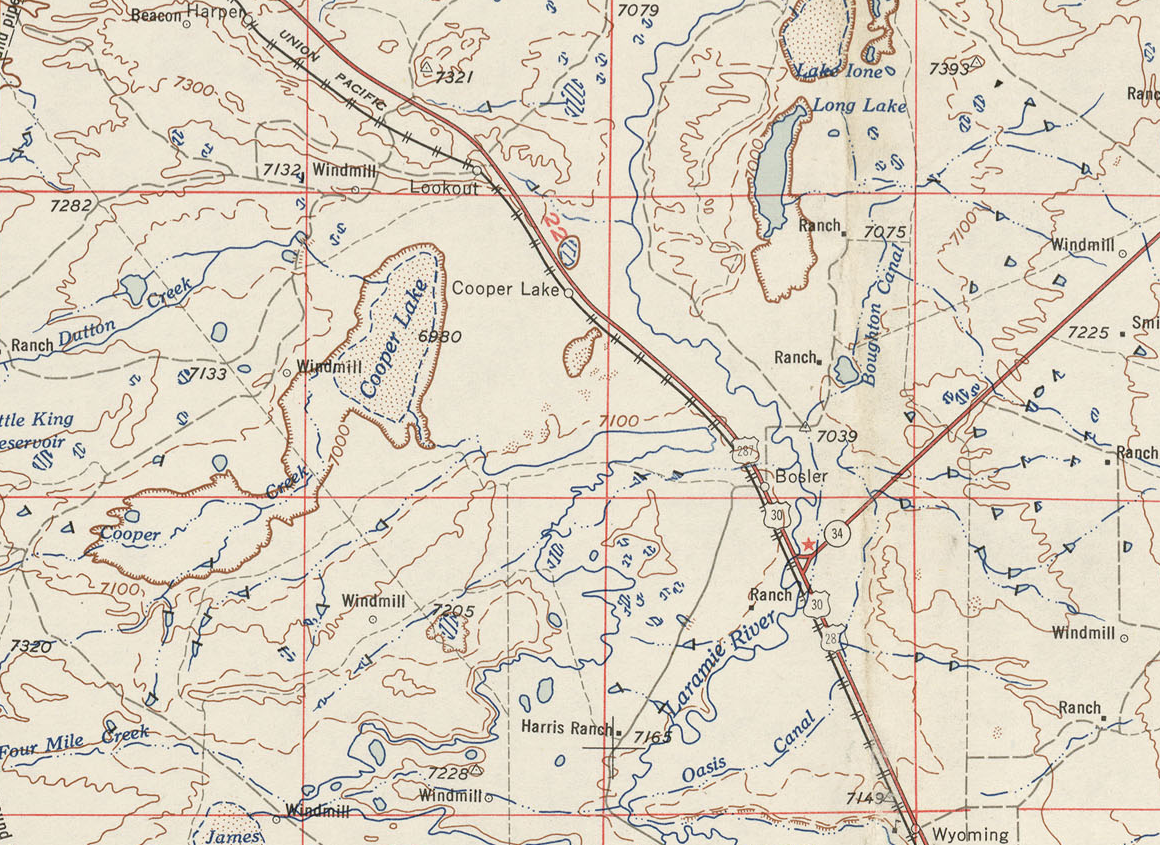
Excerpt of 1954 United States Geological Survey map showing Lookout along route of the Union Pacific Railroad.

Lookout was a station of the Union Pacific Railroad in Albany County, Wyoming, United States.

A former station was part of the route of the First transcontinental railroad. An 1869 railroad guide describes the station as located at mile post 603 on the rail line, with "Mr. John Owens, the agent and operator. The country is rolling but less bluffy since leaving Laramie."

The 1916 edition of The Complete Official Road Guide of the Lincoln Highway describes Lookout as containing a railroad station with "no accommodation for tourists. Drinking and radiator water can be obtained. Camp site. There are several large stock ranches near here."

In the 1930 Census, the population of the Lookout district was 33. It declined to 6 by the 1940 census.

Nearby Lookout Ranch is the site of a proposed wind farm project, called Lucky Star Wind Project. It was projected to start construction in 2020 and would produce 500 megawatts of electricity from 277 wind turbines. The project describes the area as "Existing land uses include range land for cattle grazing with landcover consisting of high meadow vegetation dominated by sage brush and high meadow grassland species. The proposed area for development is approximately 7000 feet in elevation. Topography varies including bluffs, plains, and rolling hill sides."
