= RBO =

RBO or Rbo may refer to:

- Rock et Belles Oreilles, a Québécois radio, television and stage comedy group
- MTA Regional Bus Operations, the surface transit division of New York's Metropolitan Transportation Authority
- Ragnarok Battle Offline, a computer game
- Reliability-based optimization, a multidisciplinary design optimization method
- Rubidium oxide, the chemical compound Rb_{2}O
- Robert Brownlee Observatory in Lake Arrowhead, California
- Rule-Based Optimization, an SQL Query plan optimization technique
- Red Buttes Observatory near Laramie, Wyoming
- Rang Badalti Odhani
- Royal Ballet and Opera, British performing companies based at the Royal Opera House, London
- Rank-biased overlap, used in ranking information
