= Albany County School District Number 1 =

School district in Wyoming, United States

Albany County School District #1

Location
- Albany County, Wyoming; United States

District information
- Superintendent: Dr. John Goldhardt
- School board: ACSD#1 Board of Education
- Chair of the board: Kim Sorenson
- Schools: 18

Students and staff
- Students: 4,009 (2018-2019)
- Teachers: 362 (2018-2019)

Other information
- Website: Official website

Albany County School District #1 is a public school district based in Laramie, Wyoming, United States.

== Geography ==
Albany County School District #1 serves all of Albany County, including the following communities:

- Incorporated places
  - City of Laramie
  - Town of Rock River
- Unincorporated places
  - Bosler
  - PhinDeli
  - Garrett
  - Tie Siding
- Census-designated places (Note: All census-designated places are unincorporated.)
  - Albany
  - Centennial
  - The Buttes
  - Woods Landing-Jelm

== History ==
The district approved a Spanish immersion program in April 2016.

== Schools ==
=== High schools ===
- Grades 9-12
  - Laramie High School
  - Rock River High School
  - Whiting High School

=== Junior high schools ===
- Grades 6-8
  - Rock River Junior High School
  - Laramie Middle School

=== Elementary/Middle Schools ===
- Grades K-8
  - Snowy Range Academy (Charter School)
  - Cozy Hallow School
  - Antelope Creek School

=== Elementary schools ===
- Grades K-5
  - Centennial Elementary School
  - Harmony Elementary School
  - Indian Paintbrush Elementary School
  - Spring Creek Elementary School
- Grades PK-5
  - Rock River Elementary School
  - Slade Elementary School
  - Velma Linford Elementary School
- Grades PK-6
  - Laramie Montessori (Charter School)

== Student demographics ==
The following figures are as of October 1, 2018.

- Total District Enrollment: 4,009
- Student enrollment by gender
  - Male: 2,083 (51.96%)
  - Female: 1,926 (48.04%)
- Student enrollment by ethnicity
  - American Indian or Alaska Native: 42 (1.05%)
  - Asian: 84 (2.10%)
  - Black or African American: 65 (1.62%)
  - Hispanic or Latino: 695 (17.34%)
  - Native Hawaiian or Other Pacific Islander: 5 (0.12%)
  - Two or More Races: 164 (4.12%)
  - White: 2,953 (73.66%)

== Board of education ==
The Albany County School District #1 Board of Education is composed of nine members elected to rotating four year terms. As of June 2020, the current board if governed by:

Position	Name	Seat	Term		First elected
Chairman	Janice Marshall	Area B	2018	2022	2004
Vice-Chairman	Mark Bittner	Area A	2016	2020	2016
Treasurer	Karen Bienz	At-Large	2016	2020	2016
Clerk	Jason Tangeman	Area A	2018	2022	2014
Trustee	Beth Bear	Area A	2018	2022	2018
Trustee	Jamin Johnson	Area A	2019*	2020	2019
Trustee	Nate Martin	Area A	2018	2022	2018
Trustee	Lawrence Perea	At-Large	2018	2022	2008
Trustee	Jason Satkunam	Area A	2020*	2020	2020
* Appointed to fill a vacancy on the Board of Education

== See also ==
- List of school districts in Wyoming
