= Hermosa, Wyoming =

Unincorporated community in Wyoming, United States

- Unincorporated community
- Location within the state of Wyoming Hermosa, Wyoming (the United States)
- Coordinates: 41°05′00″N 105°29′15″W
- Country: United States
- State: Wyoming
- County: Albany
- Time zone: UTC-7 (Mountain (MST))
  - Summer (DST): UTC-6 (MDT)
- ZIP codes: 82058
- GNIS feature ID: 1589495

Hermosa is an unincorporated community in Albany County, Wyoming, United States. Hermosa means beautiful woman in Spanish.

To the east is the Hermosa Tunnel of the Union Pacific Railroad built in 1901 when the railroad was relocated, the line is part of the First transcontinental railroad's Overland Route.
