= Spring Creek Elementary School =

Spring Creek Elementary School may refer to:

- Spring Creek Elementary School - Rockford Public School District 205 - Rockford, Illinois
- Spring Creek Elementary School - Elko County School District - Spring Creek, Nevada
- Spring Creek Elementary School - Deer Creek School District - Oklahoma City, Oklahoma
- Spring Creek Elementary School - Hamilton County Department of Education - Chattanooga, Tennessee
- Spring Creek Elementary School - Garland Independent School District - Garland, Texas
- Spring Creek Elementary School - Richardson Independent School District - Dallas, Texas
- Spring Creek Elementary School - Albany County School District 1 - Laramie, Wyoming
