= Garrett, Wyoming =

Unincorporated community in Wyoming, United States

- Unincorporated community
- Location within the state of Wyoming Garrett, Wyoming (the United States)
- Coordinates: 42°6′48″N 105°36′36″W
- Country: United States
- State: Wyoming
- County: Albany
- Time zone: UTC-7 (Mountain (MST))
  - Summer (DST): UTC-6 (MDT)
- ZIP code: 82058
- GNIS feature ID: 1597328

Garrett is an unincorporated community in northern Albany County, Wyoming, United States, along the North Laramie River. It lies along local roads north of the city of Laramie, the county seat of Albany County. Although Garrett is unincorporated, it once had a post office, with the ZIP code of 82058. The building remains, though is no longer in use. Garrett is also home to River Bridge School, a one-room schoolhouse that is part of Albany County School District #1.
