= Wild West Relay =

The Wild West Relay is a 200-mile team running relay race held annually in August following a rural course in northern Colorado and southern Wyoming between Fort Collins and Steamboat Springs, Colorado. First organized the event is now capped at 100 teams (of either 12 or 6 runners). The remote and scenic course begins on the plains north of Fort Collins. From there, the course winds north through Red Feather Lakes to Woods Landing, Wyoming, then south through Routt and Roosevelt National Forests, through Walden, Colorado, over the Continental Divide at Rabbit Ears Pass, and finishes in Steamboat Springs, Colorado.

Currently owned and hosted by Run.Colorado Relays, 2025 will be the 22nd year of the Wild West Relays.

StoryPath Creative produced a short documentary, Run Wild, about the Wild West Relay. The film follows participants during the race and features footage of the course, including its rural landscapes and nighttime running sections

== Other ==
Most athletes complete this race as a team in a relay format, however a few runners have completed this race solo. Events that are over a marathon distance of 26.2 miles are considered ultramarathons, so teams who do this with smaller teams or solo are running ultramarathon distance.
