= Millbrook, Wyoming =

United States unincorporated community

- Unincorporated community
- Location within the state of Wyoming Millbrook, Wyoming (the United States)
- Coordinates: 41°19′15″N 105°55′13″W
- Country: United States
- State: Wyoming
- County: Albany
- Elevation: 7,474 ft (2,278 m)
- Time zone: UTC-7 (Mountain (MST))
  - Summer (DST): UTC-6 (MDT)
- ZIP codes: 82058
- GNIS feature ID: 1597407

Millbrook is an unincorporated community in Albany County, Wyoming, United States.
