= Cooper Lake, Wyoming =

- Unincorporated community
- Location within the state of Wyoming Cooper Lake, Wyoming (the United States)
- Coordinates: 41°37′58″N 105°46′08″W
- Country: United States
- State: Wyoming
- County: Albany
- Time zone: UTC-7 (Mountain (MST))
  - Summer (DST): UTC-6 (MDT)
- ZIP Code: 82058
- GNIS feature ID: 1586964

Cooper Lake is a railroad station and former settlement in Albany County, Wyoming, United States.

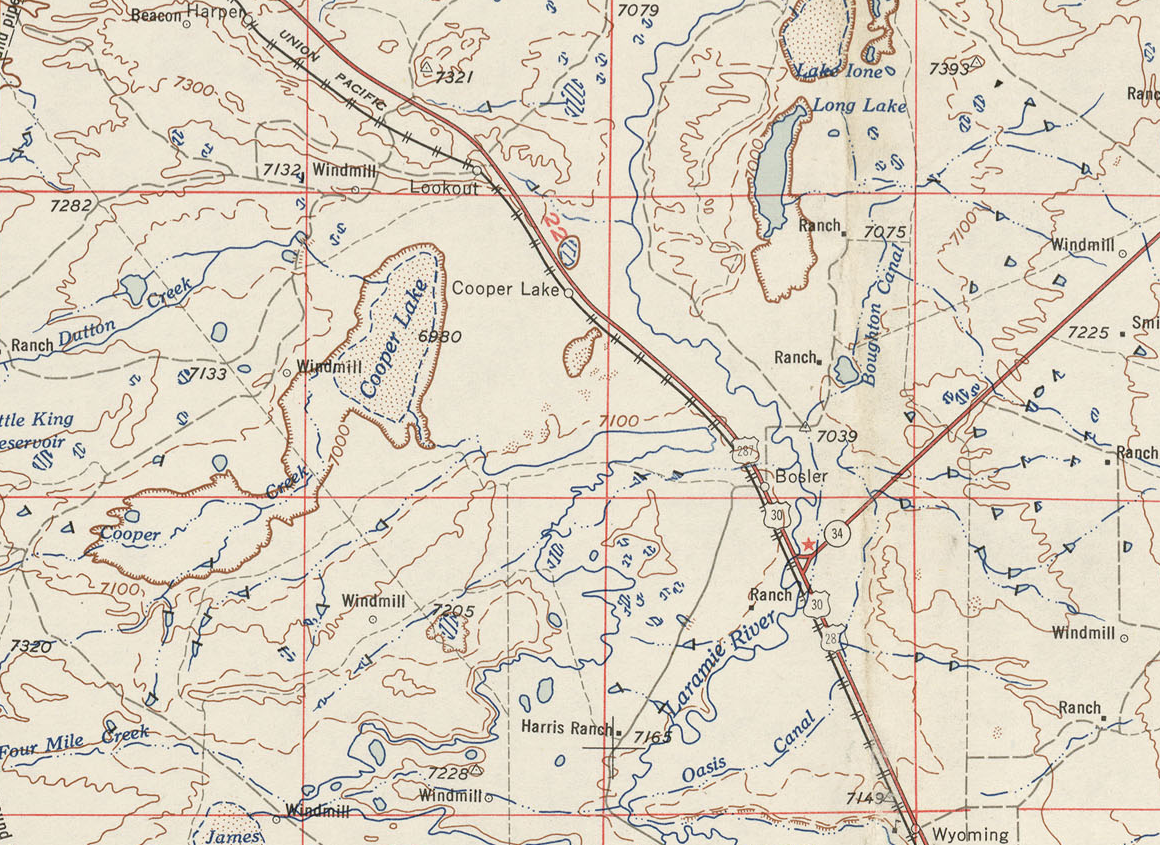
Excerpt of 1954 United States Geological Survey map showing Cooper Lake along route of the Union Pacific Railroad.

It is named for the lake located to west of the community and was created as a station on the Union Pacific Railroad and First transcontinental railroad in the late 1860s.

During an 1867 surveying expedition, several Euro-American men died in a skirmish with Native Americans near where the Cooper Lake station became located. The Cooper Lake station was about 15 miles west of the Wyoming station, at an elevation of 7,044 feet. During the construction of the railroad, a large number of railroad ties were delivered to this location. The line from Omaha, Nebraska reached Cooper Lake by July 1, 1868. A small store was opened at the Cooper Lake station to supply provisions to freighters and tie cutters. The store was robbed in 1869, and the guilty parties were captured.

An 1869 railroad guide describes the station as follows: "The station, with a grocery in it, it owned by the occupant. Aside from this there is one saloon to fill this bill. The company receives a great many ties at this station. There is a Telegraph Office here. Elk Mountain can be seen off to the south from here."

The 1916 edition of The Complete Official Road Guide of the Lincoln Highway describes Cooper Lake as "nothing but a section house; no accommodation for tourists. Drinking water, radiator water and camp site."

== Geography ==
The area around Cooper Lake features beds of sandstone and claystone dating to the Tertiary period, intercalated with beds of sand and conglomerate. The lake bed had dried up by 1956.
