= Chugwater Creek =

Stream in Wyoming, United States

Coordinates: 42°07′22″N 104°50′49″W

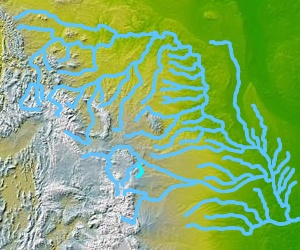
Chugwater Creek

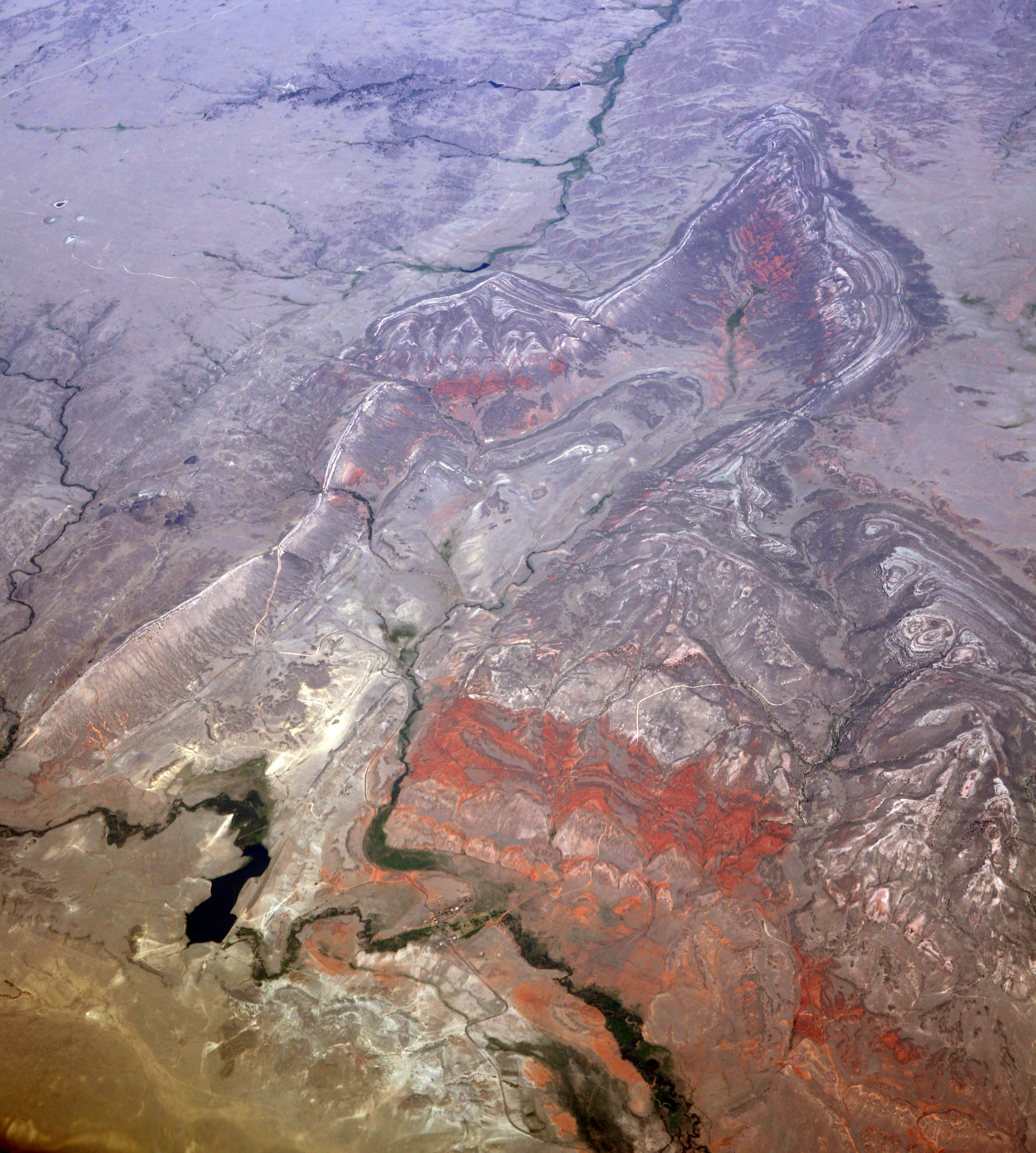
Spring Creek (above) joins Middle Chugwater Creek

Chugwater Creek is a tributary of the Laramie River in southeastern Wyoming in the United States. The stream rises northeast of Laramie, in the Laramie Mountains in eastern Albany County and flows 92.6 miles (149 km). It flows northeast, emerges from the mountains and flows past Chugwater, where it turns north-northwest, and flows past Slater. Chugwater Creek joins the Laramie approximately 7 miles (11 km) northeast of Wheatland.

== See also ==
- Chugwater formation, redbeds
- List of Wyoming rivers
