= Albany, Wyoming =

- CDP
- Location in Albany County and the state of Wyoming
- Coordinates: 41°10′48″N 106°6′52″W
- Country: United States
- State: Wyoming
- County: Albany

Area
  - Total: 11.0 sq mi (28 km^{2})
  - Land: 11.0 sq mi (28 km^{2})
  - Water: 0 sq mi (0 km^{2})
- Elevation: 8,327 ft (2,538 m)

Population (2020)
  - Total: 31
  - Density: 2.8/sq mi (1.1/km^{2})
- Time zone: UTC-7 (Mountain (MST))
  - Summer (DST): UTC-6 (MDT)
- ZIP Code: 82070
- Area code: 307
- GNIS feature ID: 2407710
- FIPS code: 56-00680

Albany is a census-designated place (CDP) in Albany County, Wyoming, United States. The population was 31 at the 2020 census.

== Geography ==
According to the United States Census Bureau, the CDP has a total area of 11.0 square miles (28.5 km^{2}), all land.

== Demographics ==
At the 2000 census, there were 80 people, 33 households and 22 families residing in the CDP. The population density was 3.9 per square mile (1.5/km^{2}). There were 99 housing units at an average density of 4.8/sq mi (1.9/km^{2}). The racial makeup of the CDP was 92.50% White, 1.25% Asian, and 6.25% from two or more races.

There were 33 households, of which 24.2% had children under the age of 18 living with them, 60.6% were married couples living together, 3.0% had a female householder with no husband present, and 33.3% were non-families. 21.2% of all households were made up of individuals, and 3.0% had someone living alone who was 65 years of age or older. The average household size was 2.42 and the average family size was 2.91.

17.5% of the population were under the age of 18, 5.0% from 18 to 24, 20.0% from 25 to 44, 38.8% from 45 to 64, and 18.8% who were 65 years of age or older. The median age was 49 years. For every 100 females, there were 105.1 males. For every 100 females age 18 and over, there were 100.0 males.

The median household income was $26,071 and the median family income was $27,321. Males had a median income of $62,321 compared with $0 for females. The per capita income for the CDP was $17,046. There were no families and 9.2% of the population living below the poverty line, including no under eighteens and none of those over 64.

== Education ==
Public education in the community of Albany is provided by Albany County School District #1.
