= Deerwood =

Deerwood may refer to:

== Canada ==
- Deerwood, Manitoba

== United States ==
=== Florida ===
Deerwood Inn motel and campground, Madison Florida

- Deerwood Country Club, Jacksonville, Florida
- Deerwood, a section of Jacksonville, Florida

=== Minnesota ===
- Deerwood, Minnesota
- Deerwood Township, Crow Wing County, Minnesota
- Deerwood Township, Kittson County, Minnesota

=== Wyoming ===
- Deerwood, Wyoming, unincorporated community in Albany County
