= Harper, Wyoming =

Unincorporated community in Wyoming, United States

- Unincorporated community
- Location within the state of Wyoming Harper, Wyoming (the United States)
- Coordinates: 41°42′34″N 105°53′19″W
- Country: United States
- State: Wyoming
- County: Albany
- Time zone: UTC-7 (Mountain (MST))
  - Summer (DST): UTC-6 (MDT)
- ZIP codes: 82058
- GNIS feature ID: 1589324

Harper is an unincorporated community in Albany County, Wyoming, United States.

The 1916 edition of The Complete Official Road Guide of the Lincoln Highway describes Harper as containing a railroad station with "no tourist accommodations. Railroad section house. Drinking water, radiator water, camp site." There was once a small coal mine near Harper, but it closed after a rush of water drove the workers away.
