= Albany County =

Albany County may refer to the following in the United States:

- Albany County, New York
- Albany County, Wyoming
