= Red Buttes Observatory =

Astronomical observatory in Wyoming

- Organization: University of Wyoming
- Location: 9 miles (14 km) from Laramie, Wyoming
- Coordinates: 41°10′35″N 105°34′26″W
- Altitude: 2,246 meters (7,369 ft)
- Established: 1994
- Website: Red Buttes Observatory

Telescopes
- unnamed telescope: 0.6 m reflector
- unnamed telescope: 0.2 m reflector

Red Buttes Observatory (RBO) is an astronomical observatory owned and operated by University of Wyoming. It is located 15 kilometers (9 mi) south of Laramie, Wyoming (USA) and was founded in 1994. The observatory houses a 0.6 m (24 in) telescope built by DFM Engineering. There are two instruments available: a 1024x1024 imaging camera, and a near-infrared camera. A second, smaller telescope built by Orion is mounted on the main telescope. Research at the observatory has included monitoring Cepheid variable stars and follow-up observation of gamma-ray bursts.

== See also ==
- Wyoming Infrared Observatory
- List of astronomical observatories
- Red Buttes, Wyoming
