= North Laramie River =

Coordinates: 42°07′36″N 104°55′28″W

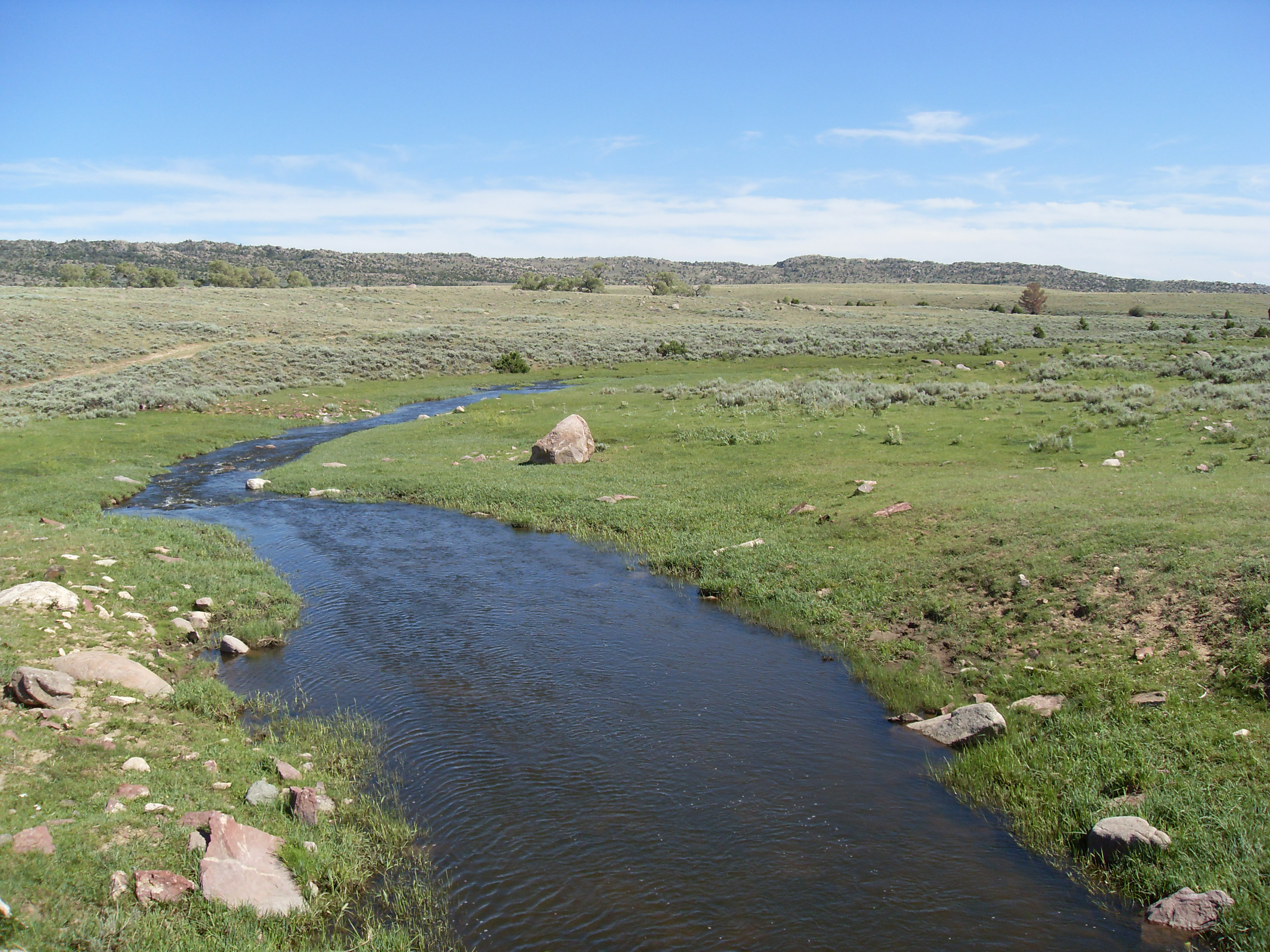
North Laramie River close to Friend Park in the Medicine Bow National Forest

The North Laramie River is a tributary of the Laramie River, 86.4 miles (139.0 km) long, in southeastern Wyoming in the United States.

It rises in the Medicine Bow National Forest in the Laramie Mountains, in northern Albany County. It flows south, then east-northeast and east, emerging from the mountains and joining the Laramie River approximately 5 miles (8 km) north of Wheatland.

== See also ==
- List of Wyoming rivers
