= Wyocolo, Wyoming =

Unincorporated community in Albany County, Wyoming, United States

- Unincorporated community
- Location within the state of Wyoming Wyocolo (the United States)
- Coordinates: 41°00′16″N 106°10′21″W
- Country: United States
- State: Wyoming
- County: Albany
- Time zone: UTC-7 (Mountain (MST))
  - Summer (DST): UTC-6 (MDT)
- ZIP codes: 82058
- GNIS feature ID: 1596647

Wyocolo is an unincorporated community near the southwestern edge of Albany County, Wyoming, United States. It is located along Wyoming Highway 230, just north of the Colorado-Wyoming border and immediately south of the unincorporated community of Mountain Home.
