= Binford (surname) =

Binford is a surname. Notable people with the surname include:

- David Binford, American politician
- Greta Binford, arachnologist
- Julien Binford (1908–1997), painter and professor of painting
- Lewis Binford (1931–2011), archaeologist
- Lloyd Binford (1869–1956), insurance executive
- Melvin J. Binford (1903–1984), football and basketball coach
- Sally Binford (1924–1994), anthropologist and archaeologist
- Thomas Binford, computer scientist at Stanford University
- Tom Binford (1924–1999), businessman and philanthropist
- Tricia Bader Binford (born 1973), American basketball coach

== See also ==
- Binford (disambiguation)
