= Deerwood, Wyoming =

Unincorporated community in Wyoming, United States

- Unincorporated community
- Location within the state of Wyoming Deerwood, Wyoming (the United States)
- Coordinates: 41°14′12″N 106°07′54″W
- Country: United States
- State: Wyoming
- County: Albany
- Time zone: UTC-7 (Mountain (MST))
  - Summer (DST): UTC-6 (MDT)
- ZIP codes: 82058
- GNIS feature ID: 1599217

Deerwood is an unincorporated community in Albany County, Wyoming, United States.
