= The Buttes, Wyoming =

Unincorporated community in Wyoming, United States

- Unincorporated community
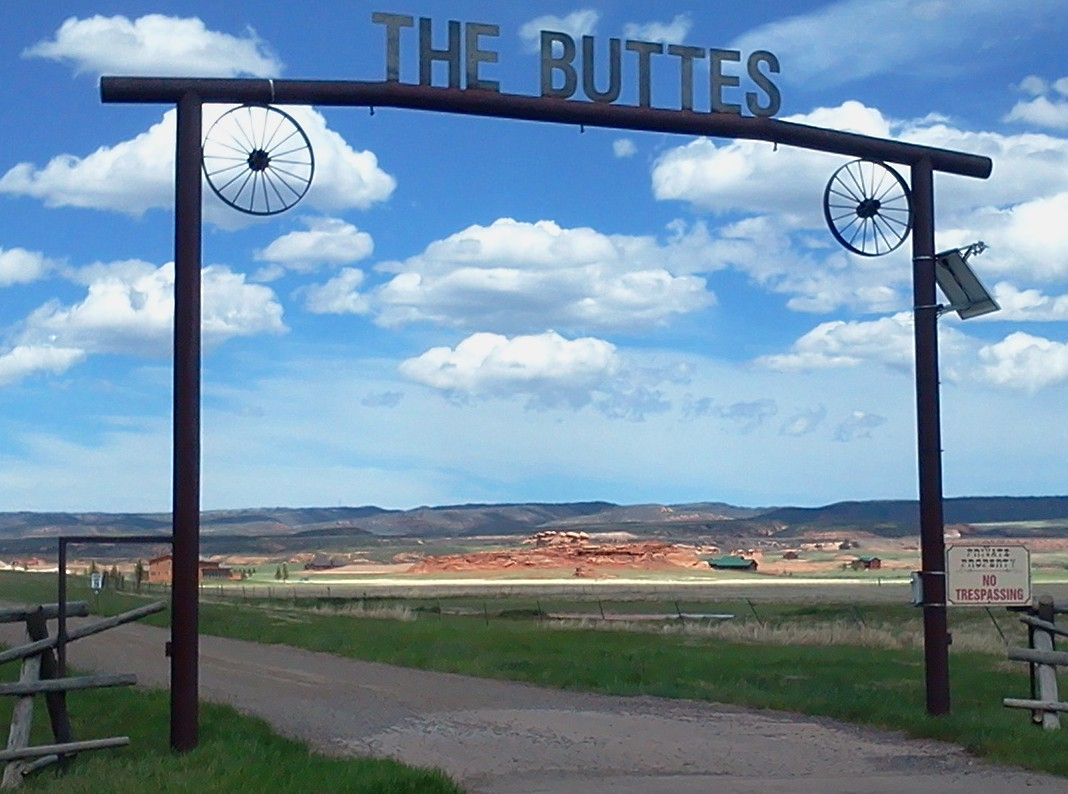
- Entrance to The Buttes from US 287

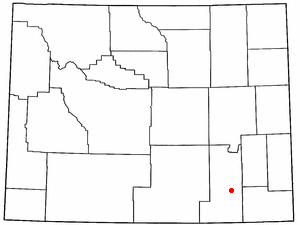
- Location of The Buttes, Wyoming
- Coordinates: 41°10′15″N 105°34′04″W
- Country: United States
- State: Wyoming
- County: Albany

Area
  - Total: 4.0 sq mi (10.3 km^{2})
  - Land: 3.9 sq mi (10.2 km^{2})
  - Water: 0.039 sq mi (0.1 km^{2})
- Elevation: 7,405 ft (2,257 m)

Population (2000)
  - Total: 31
  - Density: 7.8/sq mi (3/km^{2})
- Time zone: UTC-7 (Mountain (MST))
  - Summer (DST): UTC-6 (MDT)
- Area code: 307
- GNIS feature ID: 2410074
- FIPS code: 56-76467

The Buttes is an unincorporated community in Albany County, Wyoming, United States. The population was 31 at the 2000 census, when it was a census-designated place (CDP).

== Geography ==
According to the United States Census Bureau, in 2000 the CDP has a total area of 4.0 square miles (10.3 km^{2}), of which 3.9 square miles (10.2 km^{2}) is land and 0.04 square mile (0.1 km^{2}) (1.01%) is water.

== Demographics ==
As of the census of 2000, there were 31 people, 14 households, and 13 families residing in the CDP. The population density was 7.9 people per square mile (3.0/km^{2}). There were 14 housing units at an average density of 3.6/sq mi (1.4/km^{2}). The racial makeup of the CDP was 100.00% White.

There were 14 households, out of which 14.3% had children under the age of 18 living with them, 92.9% were married couples living together, and 7.1% were non-families. 7.1% of all households were made up of individuals, and none had someone living alone who was 65 years of age or older. The average household size was 2.21 and the average family size was 2.31.

In the CDP the population was spread out, with 12.9% under the age of 18, 12.9% from 25 to 44, 67.7% from 45 to 64, and 6.5% who were 65 years of age or older. The median age was 52 years. For every 100 females, there were 93.8 males. For every 100 females age 18 and over, there were 107.7 males.

The median income for a household in the CDP was $63,750, and the median income for a family was $63,750. Males had a median income of $46,250 versus $18,750 for females. The per capita income for the CDP was $16,154. None of the population or families were below the poverty line.

== Education ==
Public education in the community of The Buttes is provided by Albany County School District #1.

== Infrastructure ==
=== Major highways ===
- US 287

=== Utilities ===
Electrical power in the community of The Buttes is provided by Carbon Power and Light, Inc.
