= Hutton Lake National Wildlife Refuge =

Refuge information

- IUCN category IV (habitat/species management area)
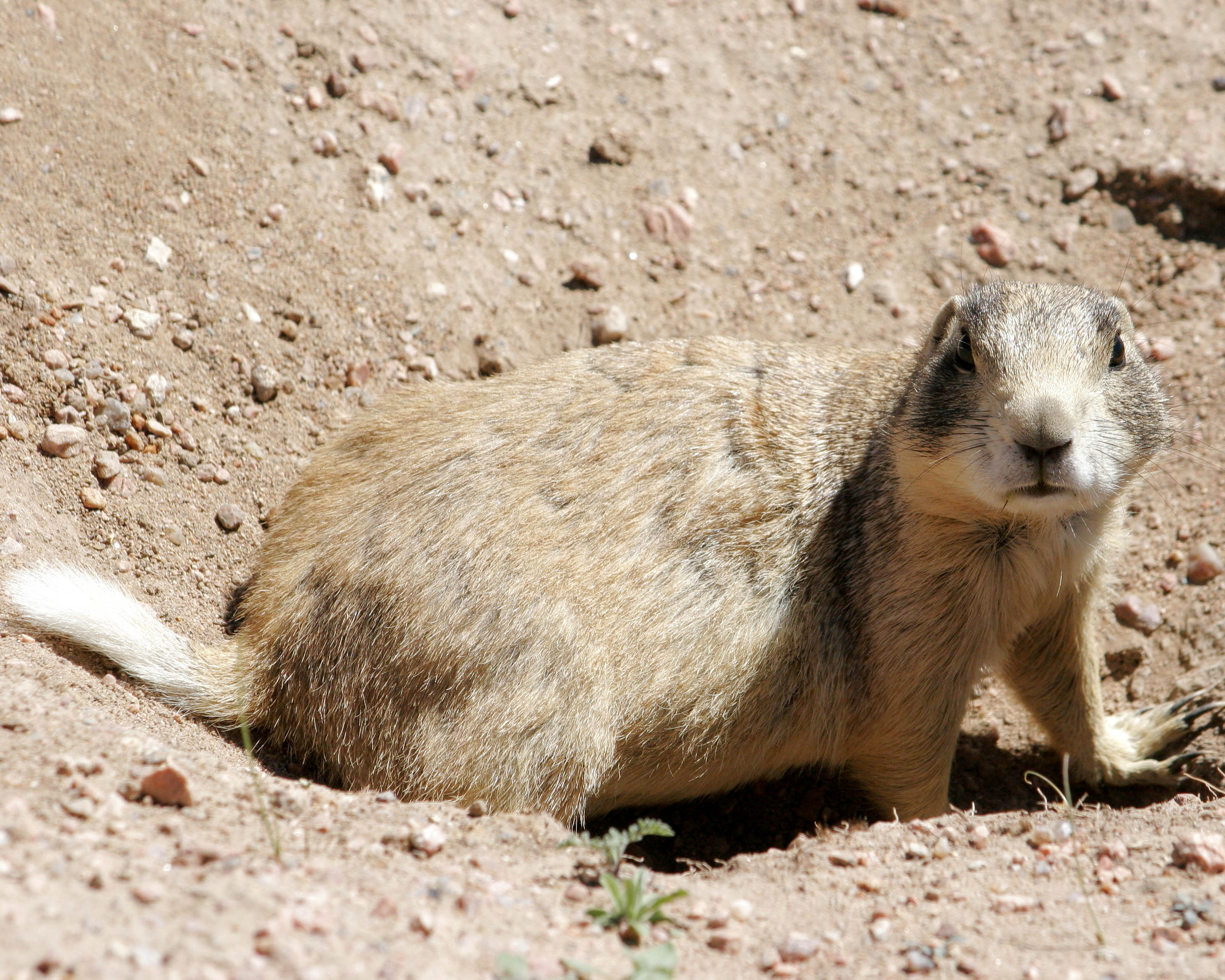
- White-tailed prairie dog in Hutton Lake National Wildlife Refuge

- Location within Wyoming Location within the United States
- Location: Albany County, Wyoming, United States
- Nearest city: Laramie
- Coordinates: 41°10′55″N 105°42′23″W
- Area: 1,968 acres (796 ha)
- Established: 1932
- Governing body: U.S. Fish and Wildlife Service
- Website: Hutton Lake National Wildlife Refuge

Hutton Lake National Wildlife Refuge, located in southern Albany County in the U.S. state of Wyoming, includes 1,968 acres (8 km^{2}). The refuge is managed by the U.S. Fish and Wildlife Service an agency within the U.S. Department of the Interior. The refuge is located at higher altitudes over 7,000 feet (2,133 m) and has a total of five natural alpine lakes that are named, as well as associated wetlands. The refuge was set aside in 1932 to protect habitat for migratory bird species and other indigenous plants and animals. Hutton Lake NWR is administered by the Arapaho National Wildlife Refuge in Colorado.

The Wyoming Toad Conservation Area was established in 2023 with the acquisition of 1,078 acres (436 ha) of land.
