= Tie Siding, Wyoming =

Unincorporated community in Wyoming, United States

- Unincorporated community
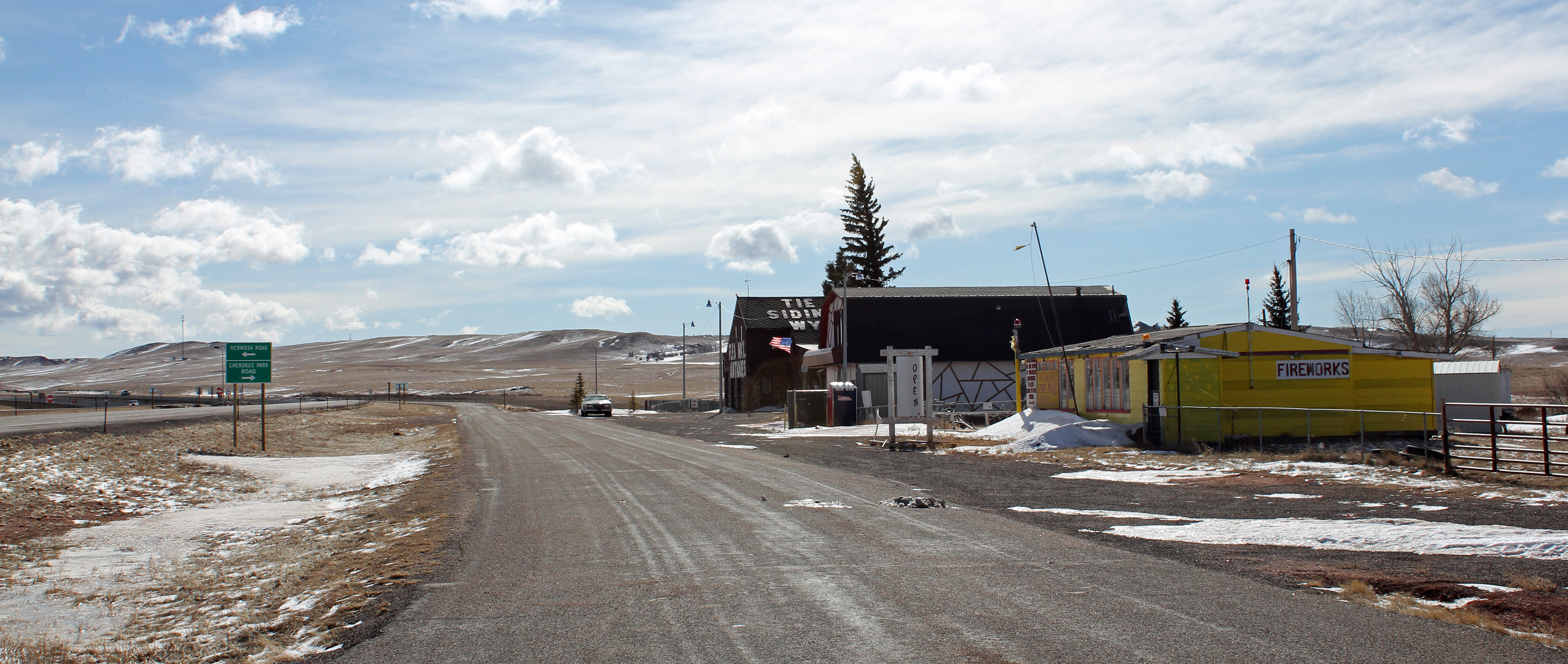
- Tie Siding in 2014.

- Location within the state of Wyoming
- Coordinates: 41°04′49″N 105°30′27″W
- Country: United States
- State: Wyoming
- County: Albany
- Time zone: UTC-7 (Mountain (MST))
  - Summer (DST): UTC-6 (MDT)
- ZIP codes: 82084
- GNIS feature ID: 1596972

Tie Siding is an unincorporated community in far southeastern Albany County, in southeastern Wyoming, United States. It is located approximately eighteen miles south of Laramie, and eight miles north of the Colorado border. The population is small, and Tie Siding was not counted as a census-designated place in the 2010 Census.

== History ==
Tie Siding was strategically located at the site by the early western railroad companies to service the expansion of rail systems in the West from the late 1860s until the early 1900s. The small community interacted with nearby Colorado railroad towns, such as Virginia Dale, LaPorte and Pingree Park.

In 1886, Edward Ivinson, a wealthy Laramie investment banker and dry goods merchant, got off a train when it made a stop in Tie Siding to take on water, and decided he wanted to build a house and a hospital here. Instead, he later returned to Laramie, a few miles to the north, and built the Ivinson Mansion for himself in 1892 on what later would be named Ivinson Street.

As of 2015, the Tie Siding site consists of only a combination flea market and post office. Plus some sounding ranch properties, including Fish Creek Ranch Preserve, Logan Ranch and Irishpearl Estates Tracts.

== Highways ==
- US 287 - north–south route through Tie Siding, running north to Laramie, and south to the Colorado border.
- County Road 31 - Cherokee Park Rd., runs southwest from Tie Siding to the Colorado border.
- County Road 222 - Hermosa Rd., runs northeast from Tie Siding to Interstate 80.
- County Road 231 - Dale Creek Rd., runs east from Tie Siding to Buford.
- County Road 316 - Sportsman Lake Rd., runs west from Tie Siding to Sand Creek Rd.
