= Mountain Home, Wyoming =

Unincorporated community in Albany County, Wyoming, United States

- Unincorporated community
- Location within the state of Wyoming Mountain Home (the United States)
- Coordinates: 41°00′29″N 106°10′21″W
- Country: United States
- State: Wyoming
- County: Albany
- Time zone: UTC-7 (Mountain (MST))
  - Summer (DST): UTC-6 (MDT)
- ZIP codes: 82058
- GNIS feature ID: 1601587

Mountain Home is an unincorporated community near the southwestern edge of Albany County, Wyoming, United States. It is located along Wyoming Highway 230, immediately north of the unincorporated community of Wyocolo, which in turn is located just north of the Colorado-Wyoming border.
