= Laramie-Poudre Tunnel =

Trans mountain tunnel in Colorado, United States

- Interactive map of Laramie-Poudre Tunnel

Overview
- Location: Colorado
- Waterway: Laramie River
- Start: Laramie River basin 40.67617°N 105.85136°W
- End: Cache la Poudre River basin 40.6694°N 105.81145°W

Operation
- Work began: 1909
- Opened: 1911
- Owner: Greeley, Colorado

Technical
- Length: 11,500 ft (3,500 m)
- Max elevation: 8,400 feet
- Grade: 1.7 degree

The Laramie-Poudre Tunnel is an early transmountain tunnel in the U.S. state of Colorado. The tunnel transfers water from the west side of the Laramie River basin, which drains to the North Platte River, to the east side Cache la Poudre River basin that drains to the South Platte River. The tunnel is about 11,500 feet (3,500 m) long with variable diameters with a minimum diameter of about 5.3 feet (1.6 m). The diameter varied due to the different material mined through and the erosion of almost 90 years of water flow. It is located at about 8,400 feet (2,600 m) elevation with about a 1.7 degree down slope. The Laramie River lies about 225 feet (69 m) higher than the Cache La Poudre River at this location separated only by a mountain ridge. The Laramie-Poudre Tunnel is located about 45 miles (72 km) west-northwest of Fort Collins, Colorado, about 20 miles (32 km) south of the Wyoming border and about 25 miles (40 km) north of Rocky Mountain National Park. It was built between 1909 and 1911 for the Laramie-Poudre Reservoirs & Irrigation Co. to convey water from the Laramie River to the Poudre River for Front Range irrigation. The tunnel was driven for the purpose of conveying through the divide 800 cu.ft of water per second.

"Work on the power-plant for operating the tunnel was begun Dec 1st 1909. The Hydro-electric power-plant was erected on the west bank of the Cache-la-Poudre, nearly opposite the eastern portal. "Repauno 60-per cent. gelatine" was used along with German Insolid and Z.L. fuse were used for blasting, with exception where the granite was really hard and tough. There were about 60 people employed with skills ranging from helpers, muckers, mechanics, stable-helpers, blacksmiths, book keeper and foremen. These were arranged in an 8-hr shift.

Court battles between Colorado and Wyoming over water rights prevented operation until 1914 (Case 1995).

As a result of the court battles the tunnel is restricted to a maximum of 9.9 m^{3}/s (350 cu ft/s) of water from the Laramie river instead of its designed 22.7 m^{3}/s (800 cu ft/s). Most of the flow occurs during the peak snow melt season of mid May to mid July. The Laramie-Poudre Tunnel typically transfers about 14,000 acre ft (17,300,000 cubic meters) from the Laramie River basin to the Cache La Poudre Basin. Agriculture users typically use about 450,000 acre ft and municipal users use a further 75,000 acre ft in the Cache La Poudre drainage basin.

In the spring of 2000 after almost 90 years of use, part of the tunnel collapsed, requiring extensive rebuilding of part of the tunnel. This rebuild cost $4,500,000 and took from November 2000 to May 16, 2001.

Greeley, Colorado partnered with North Weld County Water and the Fort Collins-Loveland Water District to purchase the Laramie Poudre Tunnel in 2006.
