= Bamforth National Wildlife Refuge =

- IUCN category IV (habitat/species management area)
- Location within Wyoming Location within the United States
- Location: Albany County, Wyoming, United States
- Nearest city: Laramie, WY
- Coordinates: 41°23′30″N 105°44′17″W
- Area: 1,116 acres (452 ha)
- Established: 1932
- Governing body: U.S. Fish and Wildlife Service
- Website: Bamforth National Wildlife Refuge

Bamforth National Wildlife Refuge is located in southern Albany County in the U.S. state of Wyoming and includes 1,116 acres (4.5 km^{2}). The refuge is managed by the U.S. Fish and Wildlife Service an agency within the U.S. Department of the Interior. The refuge is divided into three sections adjacent to Bamforth Reservoir, which is primarily owned by the state of Wyoming. The refuge is closed to the public and is unstaffed. Bamforth NWR is administered by Arapaho National Wildlife Refuge in Colorado.
