= Wyoming Infrared Observatory =

Observatory in Albany County, Wyoming, United States

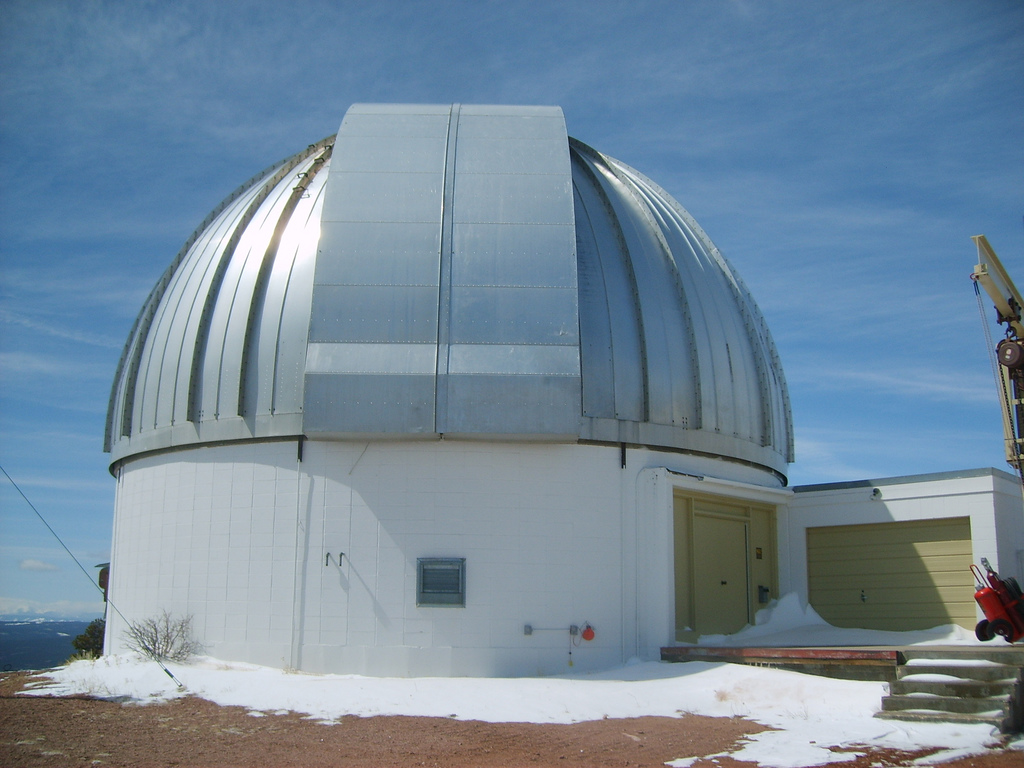
- Wyoming Infrared Observatory dome
- Alternative names: Jelm Mountain Observatory
- Organization: University of Wyoming
- Location: near Laramie, Wyoming
- Coordinates: 41.097°N 105.977°W
- Altitude: 2,943 meters (9,656 ft)
- Established: 1975
- Website: Wyoming Infrared Observatory

Telescopes
- WIRO Telescope: 2.3 m reflector
- Related media on Commons

The Wyoming Infrared Observatory (WIRO) is an astronomical observatory owned and operated by the University of Wyoming. It is located on Jelm Mountain, 25 miles (40 km) southwest of Laramie, Wyoming, United States. It was founded in 1975, and observations began at the site in 1977. Recent research performed at WIRO includes searching for runaway stars, monitoring short-term variations in blazars, and monitoring massive binary stars.

== Telescope ==
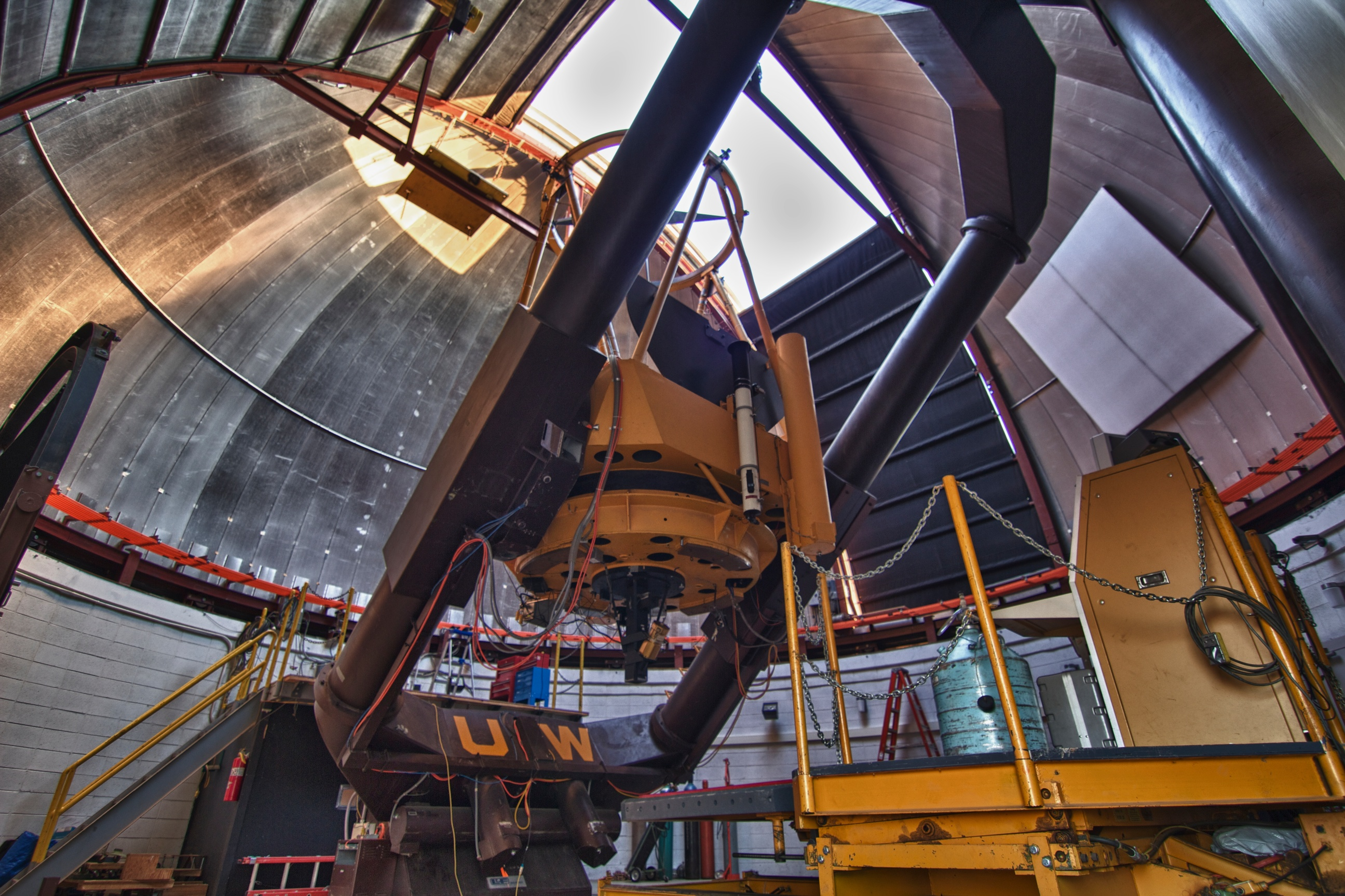
The Wyoming Infrared Telescope

The 2.3 m (91 in) WIRO telescope is a classical Cassegrain reflector optimized for infrared observing. The secondary mirror can be "wobbled" under computer control to allow for rapid sampling of adjacent areas of the sky. From 1977 to around 1980, the telescope was the largest functional infrared telescope in the world.

Two instruments are available for use:

- WIRO-Prime, a 2048x2048 charge-coupled device (CCD) imaging camera mounted at the prime focus
- WIRO-Long Slit, a low resolution, high efficiency long slit spectrograph

== Research and discoveries ==
The telescope is used for a wide variety of research. It helped identify a new globular star cluster within the Milky Way as part of a 2004 effort with the Spitzer Space Telescope. In 2016, the telescope assisted efforts using the Spitzer telescope to identify and discover around 100 of the fastest-moving known stars in the Milky Way.

The first dust formation episode in a Wolf-Rayet star was recorded on UY Scuti soon after the telescope's first light in 1979.

== See also ==
- List of astronomical observatories
- List of largest infrared telescopes
- Red Buttes Observatory
