= Jacques La Ramée =

French-Canadian and Métis coureur des bois

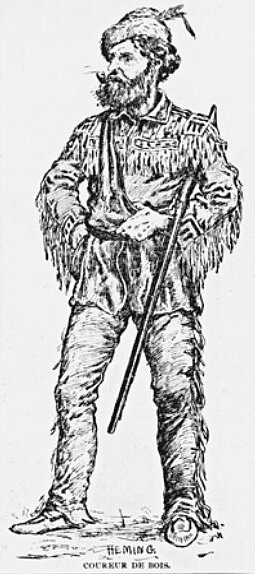
- Jacques La Ramée was a coureur des bois, believed similar in appearance to this woodcut by artist Arthur Heming
- Born: June 7, 1784; Yamaska, British Canada
- Died: 1821 (aged 37); Laramie River, United States Unorganized Territory, present-day Wyoming
- Other names: Jacques Laramée, La Ramie, La Rami, La Remy, or Laramie
- Occupations: voyageur, frontiersman, coureur des bois, trapper, fur trader, hunter, explorer
- Employer(s): North West Company, La Ramée family free trapping company
- Parent(s): Joseph Fissiau dit Laramée and Jeanne Mondou

Jacques La Ramée (June 8, 1784 – 1821) was a French-Canadian and Métis coureur des bois, frontiersman, trapper, fur trader, hunter, explorer, and mountain man who lived in what is now the U.S. state of Wyoming, having settled there in 1815. His name appears in several spellings, including La Ramee, Laramée, LaRamée, La Ramie, La Rami, La Remy, and Laramie. La Ramée is credited as an early explorer of what is now called the Laramie River of Wyoming and Colorado. The city of Laramie, Wyoming, with an Americanized spelling, was later named for him.

== Early life ==
Jacques La Ramée was born on June 8, 1784, in Yamaska, Quebec, British Canada, to Joseph Fissiau dit Laramée and Jeanne Mondou.

Volume VI of the North West Company registry records two Laramée brothers, Jacques and Joseph in 1811 who worked for the company. A variant of the name La Ramée was first documented in the western United States in 1798, referring to a canoe man who worked until 1804. This may have been Francois Laramée, who is also listed in the registry of the NW company. This La Ramée had several sons who ventured west into Wyoming and Idaho. According to Joachim Fromhold, one of the sons was the Jacques La Rami for whom the Laramie River was named.

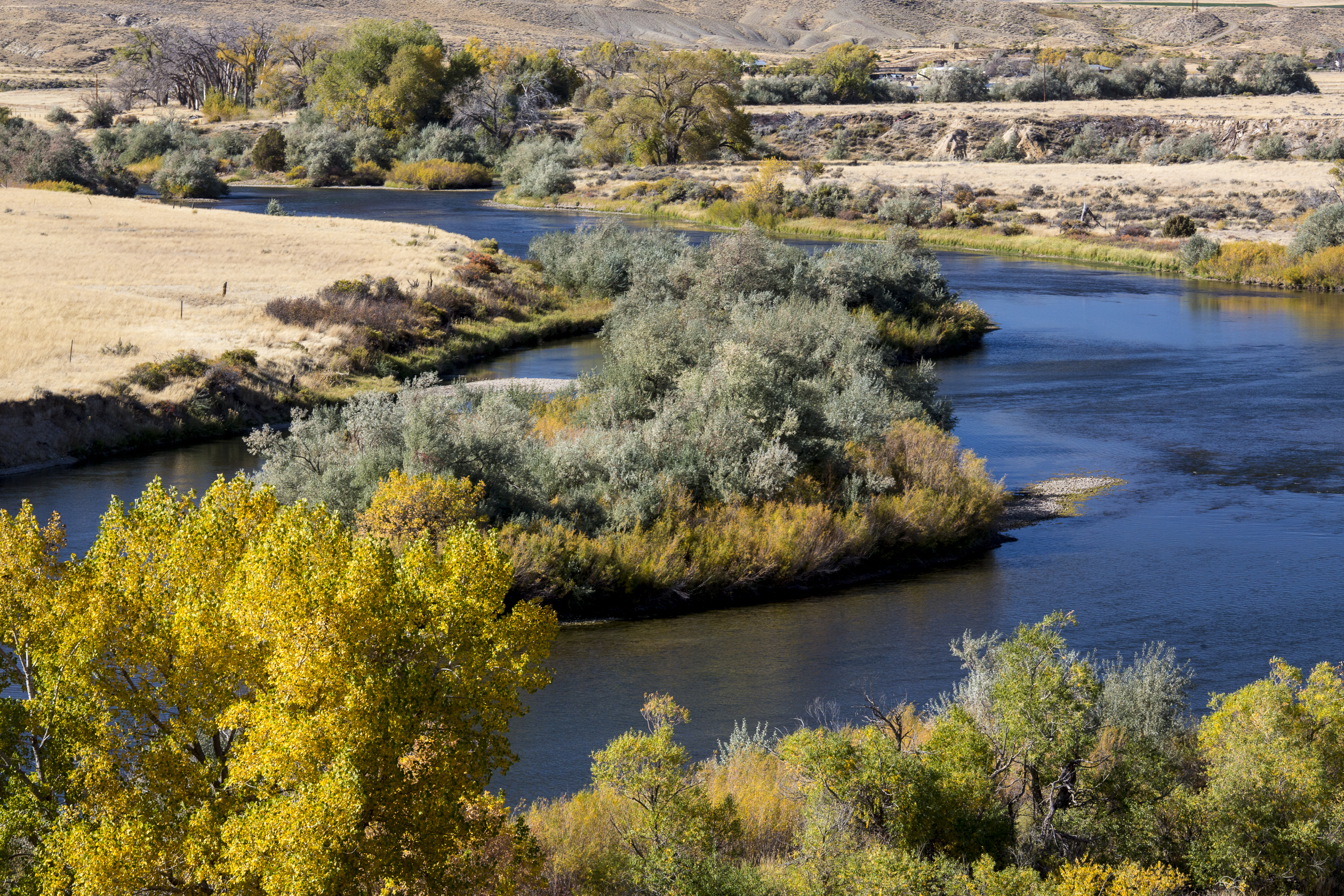
Jacques La Ramée organized a group of independent, free trappers, who set out in 1815 for the headwaters of the North Platte River in the United States Unorganized Territory of present-day Wyoming

According to Lakota writer and oral historian Susan Bordeaux Bettelyoun, her father, fur trader James Bordeaux, was La Ramée's cousin and discovered his body after his death.

== Fur trader and explorer ==
According to historian C. G. Coutant, Jacques La Ramée worked as a voyageur and fur trader for the North West Company and John Jacob Astor's American Fur Company. Employees of the North West Company and its rival, the Hudson's Bay Company, were in competition, and disputes at times turned violent. In 1821 the two feuding companies merged.

La Ramée was known for his character and peaceful reputation. He organized a group of independent trappers, who set out in 1815 to find the headwaters of the North Platte River in the United States Unorganized Territory of present-day Wyoming. Coutant writes that La Ramée and his band of trappers befriended many Native American tribes, who would trade pelts to them for European goods. This enterprise established the free trapper rendezvous in Wyoming, where trappers represented themselves without middle-men or an umbrella company. According to journalist Jim McKee (citing Robert Stuart from 1812), free trappers would rendezvous each May on the Oregon Trail pathway along the shore of the North Platte River. La Ramée was a leader and was considered the trappers' spokesperson. He assigned trapping areas among the free traders.

== LaRamée's rendezvous ==
In 1815, La Ramée organized a free-trapper rendezvous at the junction of the North Platte and what is now named the Laramie rivers. Later fur-trading companies held annual rendezvous here. For five years these events attracted more trappers and traders, and a trade market was established, in addition to routes to and from supply depots. In May, following the rendezvous, traders would arrange for transport of the pelts to Saint Louis, Missouri on bullboats via the Missouri river. Supplies were returned by keelboat or bullboat. La Ramée distributed supplies to the free trappers, and assigned their geographic trapping area for the coming season.

== Death ==
La Ramée was known to have set off in 1820 to trap along what is now known as the Laramie River and its tributaries. He was never seen alive again. When he did not show up for the rendezvous, organizers initiated a search for him. Speculation on his disappearance and death vary. It was said that he slipped on ice and fell into the Laramie River; or that his body was found in a small cabin; or that he was found "stuffed under a beaver dam"; or that he was killed by rival trappers or traders, and thrown into the Laramie River. An alleged eyewitness account, from Pierre Lesperance, said that La Ramée's camp was attacked by Arapaho warriors, but the latter vigorously denied this. According to Susan Bordeaux Bettelyoun, also known as Red Cormorant Woman (Lakota), her father, the fur trader James Bordeaux, was La Ramée's cousin who discovered his body after his death.

== Legacy ==
Several geographic sites in Wyoming were named for La Ramée (anglicized to Laramie), including the Laramie River, the city of Laramie, Fort Laramie, Laramie Peak, and Laramie County.

Laramidia, an island continent in the Late Cretaceous, was named after the Laramide orogeny, which in turn was named after the Laramie Mountains.

== In popular culture ==
James A. Michener's 1974 historical novel, Centennial, featured "Pasquinel", a French Métis coureur des bois from Montreal. He was portrayed as an early frontier mountain man and trapper in 1795 Colorado, then part of the Spanish Upper Louisiana Territory of Mexico. NBC television produced a mini-series adaptation of the same name, airing it in 1978–1979. Pasquinel was portrayed by American TV actor, Robert Conrad. The character of Pasquinel was loosely based on La Ramée.

== See also ==
- Canadian canoe routes
- North American fur trade
- Rendezvous (fur trade)
