= Benford =

Benford is an English surname of unknown origin. Notable people with the surname include:

- Christian Benford (born 2000), American football player
- Frank Benford, American scientist who gives his name to:
  - Benford's law, which holds that in large sets of data, individual numbers are more likely to start with lower digits
- Gregory Benford, American science fiction author and astrophysicist
- James Benford, American physicist, High-Power Microwave (HPM) scientist, book author, science-fiction writer, and entrepreneur
- Tommy Benford, American jazz drummer

Fictional characters:

- Mark Benford, main character of the TV series FlashForward
