= Binford, Wyoming =

Unincorporated community in Wyoming, United States

Coordinates: 42°20′00″N 105°20′35″W

Binford is a populated place in Albany County, Wyoming, United States. A post office was established in Binford in February 1897 and named for Adelyn F. Binford, the first postmaster. Post office service continued until 1937.

Trains served the communities of Albany County, including Binford, in the 1900s.

== See also ==
- Esterbrook, Wyoming
