= Laramie River =

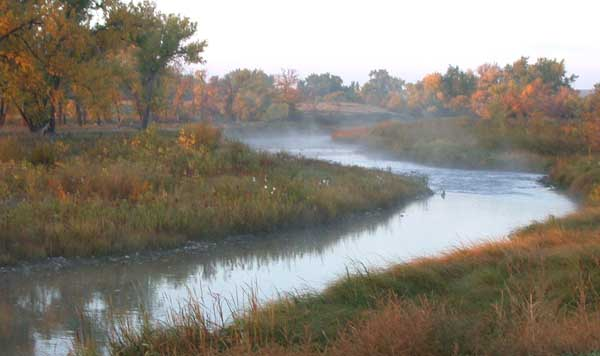
- The Laramie River, as it flows past the site of old Fort Laramie

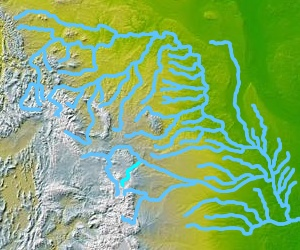
- Map highlighting the Laramie River (in bright blue, below and slightly left of center)
- Etymology: Named for Jacques La Ramie, French Canadian fur trapper

Location
- Country: United States
- State: Colorado, Wyoming
- Cities: Laramie, Wheatland, Fort Laramie

Physical characteristics
- Source: Chambers Lake (Colorado)
  - location: Larimer County, Colorado
  - coordinates: 40°36′56″N 105°51′29″W
  - elevation: 9,192 ft (2,802 m)
- Mouth: North Platte River
  - location: Goshen County, Wyoming
  - coordinates: 42°11′59″N 104°31′47″W
  - elevation: 4,213 ft (1,284 m)
- Length: 280 mi (450 km)
- Basin size: 4,564 mi^{2} (11,820 km^{2})
- Discharge
  - location: near Fort Laramie, 0.6 miles (1.0 km) from mouth
  - average: 129 cu ft/s (3.7 m^{3}/s)
  - minimum: 0 cu ft/s (0 m^{3}/s)
  - maximum: 6,260 cu ft/s (177 m^{3}/s)

Basin features
- Tributaries
  - left: North Laramie River
  - right: Chugwater Creek

The Laramie River is a tributary of the North Platte River, approximately 280 miles (450 km) long, in the U.S. states of Colorado and Wyoming. The river was named for Jacques La Ramie, a fur trapper who visited the area in the early 19th century. Laramie County, Wyoming, the city of Laramie, and other geographical entities in the region have "Laramie" in their names.

== Course ==
The river rises in northern Colorado, in the Roosevelt National Forest in the Front Range, in western Larimer County. It flows north-northwest into Wyoming, along the east side of the Medicine Bow Mountains, past Jelm and Woods Landing, then northeast emerging from the mountains 22 miles (35 km) southwest of Laramie. The river then flows north through Laramie. In the Laramie Plains it is joined by the Little Laramie River. The Laramie River then continues north through the Laramie Plains and through Wheatland Reservoir. It flows northeast through the Laramie Mountains. Emerging from the mountains, it receives the North Laramie River 5 miles (8 km) north of Wheatland and Chugwater Creek 7 mi (11 km) northeast of Wheatland. It joins the North Platte opposite the town Fort Laramie.

In its upper reaches in Colorado, the river supplies water to the Cache La Poudre River via the Laramie–Poudre Tunnel. The tunnel, which is approximately 2 miles (3 km) long, was finished in 1911 as part of a larger irrigation project for northern Colorado.

=== Discharge ===
Statistic	Location	Time period	Discharge
Yearly mean discharge	Near Woods Landing	year	173 cu ft/s (4.9 m^{3}/s)
	Near Bosler	year	150 cu ft/s (4.2 m^{3}/s)
	Near Fort Laramie	year	129 cu ft/s (3.7 m^{3}/s)
Month with highest mean discharge	Near Woods Landing	June	782 cu ft/s (22.1 m^{3}/s)
	Near Bosler	June	726 cu ft/s (20.6 m^{3}/s)
	Near Fort Laramie	May	363 cu ft/s (10.3 m^{3}/s)
Month with lowest mean discharge	Near Woods Landing	January	38.5 cu ft/s (1.09 m^{3}/s)
	Near Bosler	September	31 cu ft/s (0.88 m^{3}/s)
	Near Fort Laramie	September	59.4 cu ft/s (1.68 m^{3}/s)

== See also ==
- List of rivers of Colorado
- List of rivers of Wyoming
