= Buford, Wyoming =

Town in Wyoming, United States

- Town
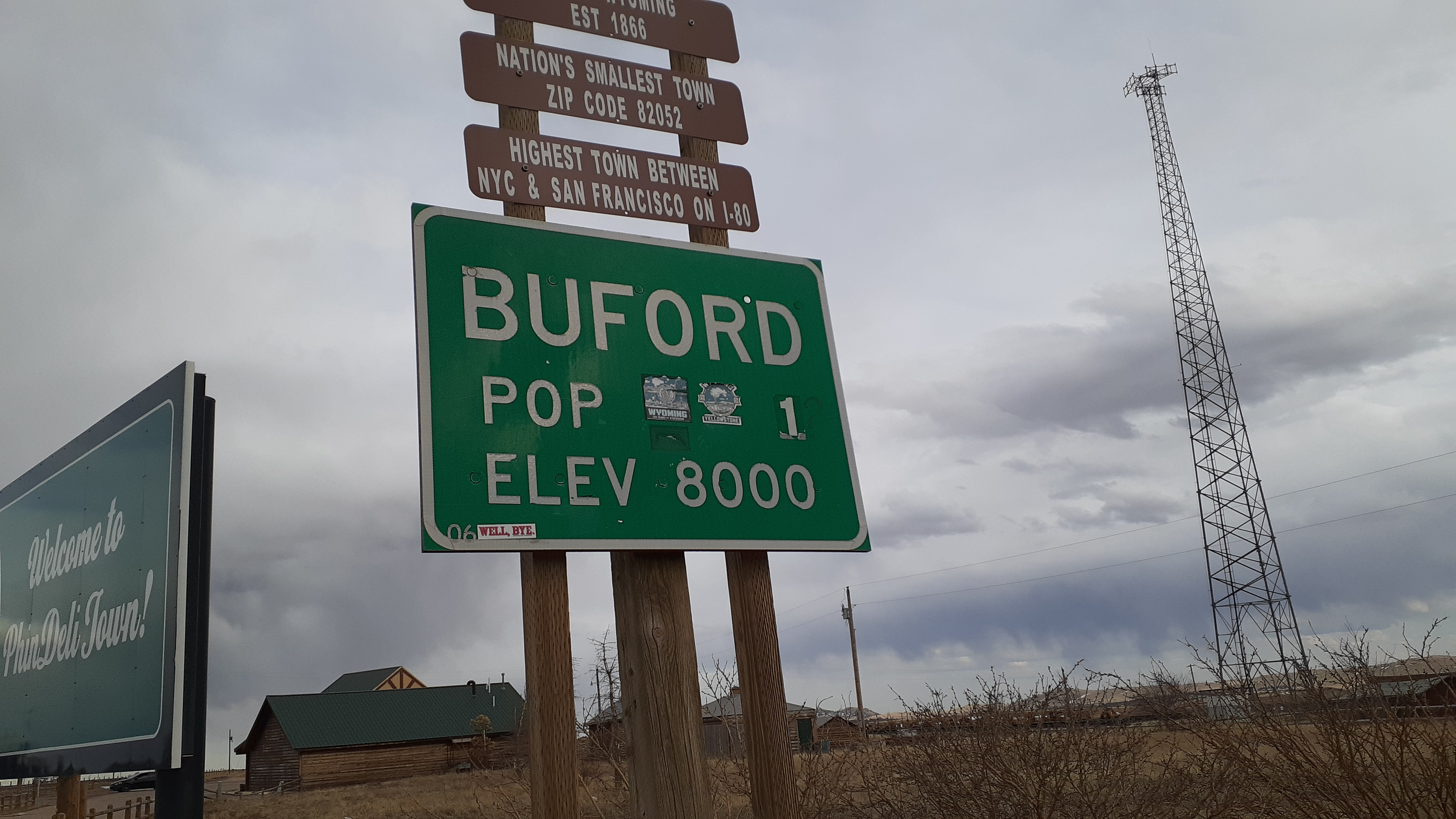
- Town sign for Buford as of April 2020

- Location within the state of Wyoming Buford, Wyoming (the United States) Buford, Wyoming (North America)
- Coordinates: 41°7′25″N 105°18′9″W
- Country: United States
- State: Wyoming
- County: Albany
- Founded: 1866

Population (2020)
  - Total: 0
- Time zone: UTC-7 (Mountain (MST))
  - Summer (DST): UTC-6 (MDT)
- ZIP codes: 82052
- GNIS feature ID: 1586078

Buford is an unincorporated community and ghost town in Albany County, Wyoming, United States. It is located between Laramie and Cheyenne on Interstate 80. Its last resident, who had been the lone resident for nearly two decades, left in 2012. As of the 2020 US Census, the population of the community is zero.

== Location ==
Buford is located in the Laramie Mountains, between the towns of Laramie and Cheyenne. The town is along the eastern approach to Sherman Hill Summit, the highest point along all of the transcontinental Interstate 80, Lincoln Highway and the Overland Route. Buford is also an access to reach the Ames Monument, which marks the highest point along the original routing of the First transcontinental railroad.

== History ==
The original town was founded in 1866. A Chicago Tribune article from 2012 stated that the locale began as a military outpost during the construction of the Transcontinental Railroad, but shrank when the fort moved to Laramie. The town once boasted a population of 2,001.

The Buford post office was established in August 1900, originally attributed as being in Laramie County but attributed to Albany County beginning in 1901. The post office suspended service on February 1, 1999, and the post office itself was discontinued on July 24, 2004, with mail service given to the post office at Cheyenne. There was a school operating in Buford from 1905 to 1962. The railroad sold the Buford site to a private buyer in 1970.

Don Sammons moved to Buford from California in 1980 with his wife and son. In 1992, he bought the parcel of land, of around 10 acres (4.0 ha), that comprises Buford, including the Buford Trading Post and its gas station. Sammons was the officer-in-charge of the post office beginning in 1993, and postmaster from April 1994 until the post office closed. Around 1995, Sammons' wife died, and around 2008, his son moved away. When Sammons decided to move to be closer to his adult son, he auctioned off the site in April 2012.

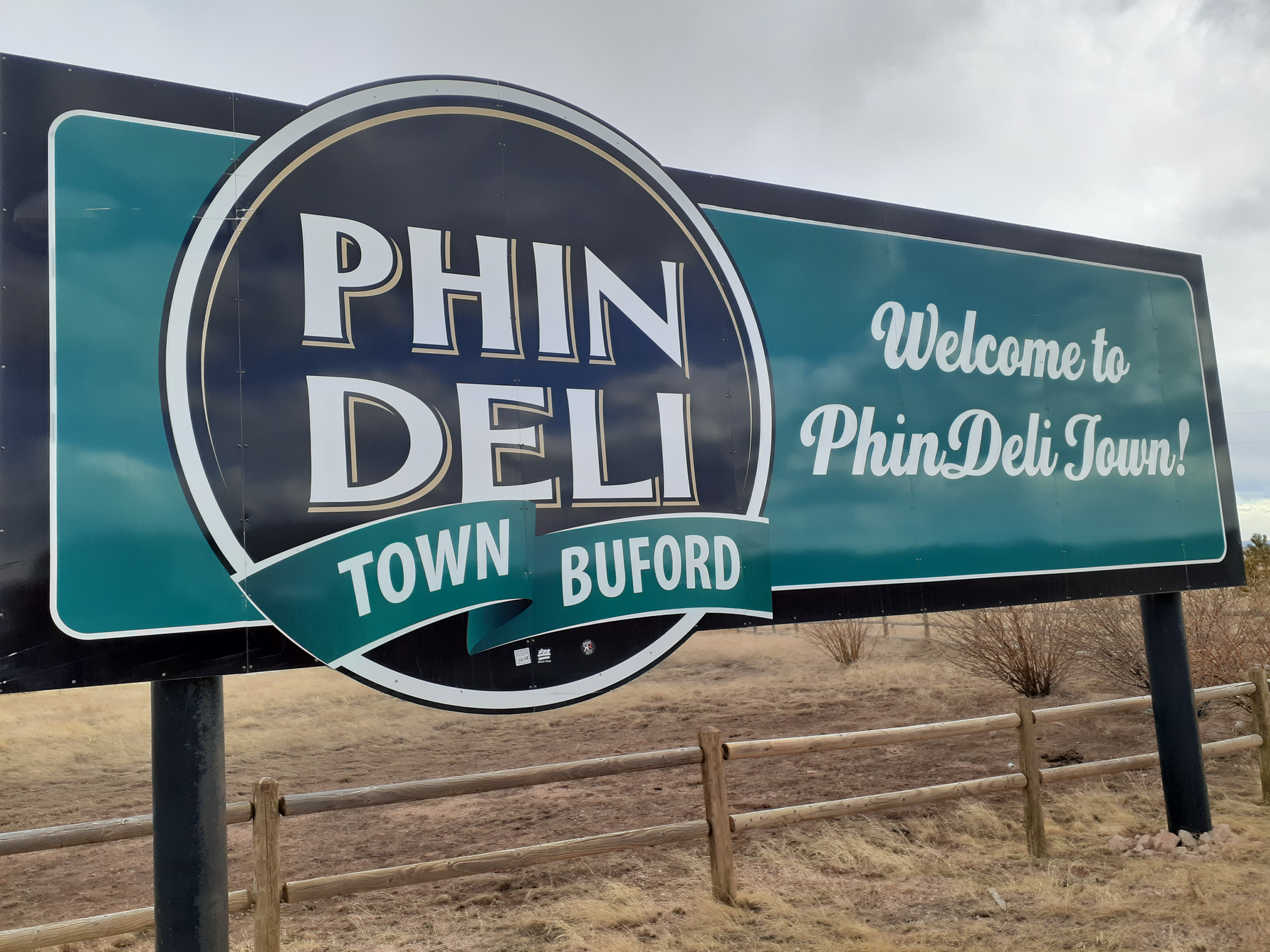
Promotional sign

The town was put up for auction on April 5, 2012, with the highest bid of $900,000 having been made by two then-unidentified Vietnamese men. Later, it was revealed that one of them was Pham Dinh Nguyen. The new owners sold "PhinDeli" brand coffee, imported from Vietnam, in the convenience store. In 2013, the new Vietnamese owner re-branded the site as "PhinDeli Town Buford". In September 2017, the manager resigned and the store was boarded up. The GasBuddy.com website indicated the PhinDeli fuel station/mini-market is running and has been since at least August 2021. In 2024, the owner announced the addition of a diesel fuel island. As of 2026, the market is branded as Buford Trading Post Office.

== See also ==
- Fort Sanders (Wyoming) — sometimes associated with Buford
