= Woods Landing-Jelm, Wyoming =

Census-designated place in Albany County, Wyoming, United States

- Census-designated place
- Location in Albany County and the state of Wyoming
- Coordinates: 41°08′10″N 106°00′11″W
- Country: United States
- State: Wyoming
- County: Albany

Area
  - Total: 16.7 sq mi (43 km^{2})
  - Land: 16.7 sq mi (43 km^{2})
  - Water: 0.0 sq mi (0 km^{2})

Population (2010)
  - Total: 97
  - Density: 5.8/sq mi (2.2/km^{2})
- Time zone: UTC-7 (Mountain (MST))
  - Summer (DST): UTC-6 (MDT)
- ZIP Codes: 82063, 82070
- Area code: 307
- FIPS code: 56-84852
- GNIS feature ID: 2409627

Woods Landing-Jelm is a census-designated place (CDP) in Albany County, Wyoming, United States. The population was 97 at the 2010 census.

== Geography ==
According to the United States Census Bureau, the CDP has a total area of 16.7 square miles (43.3 km^{2}), all land.

== Demographics ==
As of the census of 2000, there were 100 people, 47 households, and 25 families residing in the CDP. The population density was 6.2 people per square mile (2.4/km^{2}). There were 86 housing units at an average density of 5.4/sq mi (2.1/km^{2}). The racial makeup of the CDP was 93.00% White, 2.00% Asian, 1.00% from other races, and 4.00% from two or more races. Hispanic or Latino people of any race were 1.00% of the population.

There were 47 households, out of which 23.4% had children under the age of 18 living with them, 44.7% were married couples living together, 6.4% had a female householder with no husband present, and 44.7% were non-families. 31.9% of all households were made up of individuals, and none had someone living alone who was 65 years of age or older. The average household size was 2.13 and the average family size was 2.65.

In the CDP, the population was spread out, with 19.0% under the age of 18, 2.0% from 18 to 24, 29.0% from 25 to 44, 46.0% from 45 to 64, and 4.0% who were 65 years of age or older. The median age was 45 years. For every 100 females, there were 117.4 males. For every 100 females age 18 and over, there were 107.7 males.

The median income for a household in the CDP was $44,063, and the median income for a family was $63,214. Males had a median income of $26,719 versus $22,500 for females. The per capita income for the CDP was $26,248. There were no families and 10.2% of the population living below the poverty line, including no under eighteens and none of those over 64.

== Education ==
Public education in the community of Woods Landing-Jelm is provided by Albany County School District #1.

== See also ==
- List of census-designated places in Wyoming
