= Albany County, Wyoming =

County in Wyoming, United States

- County
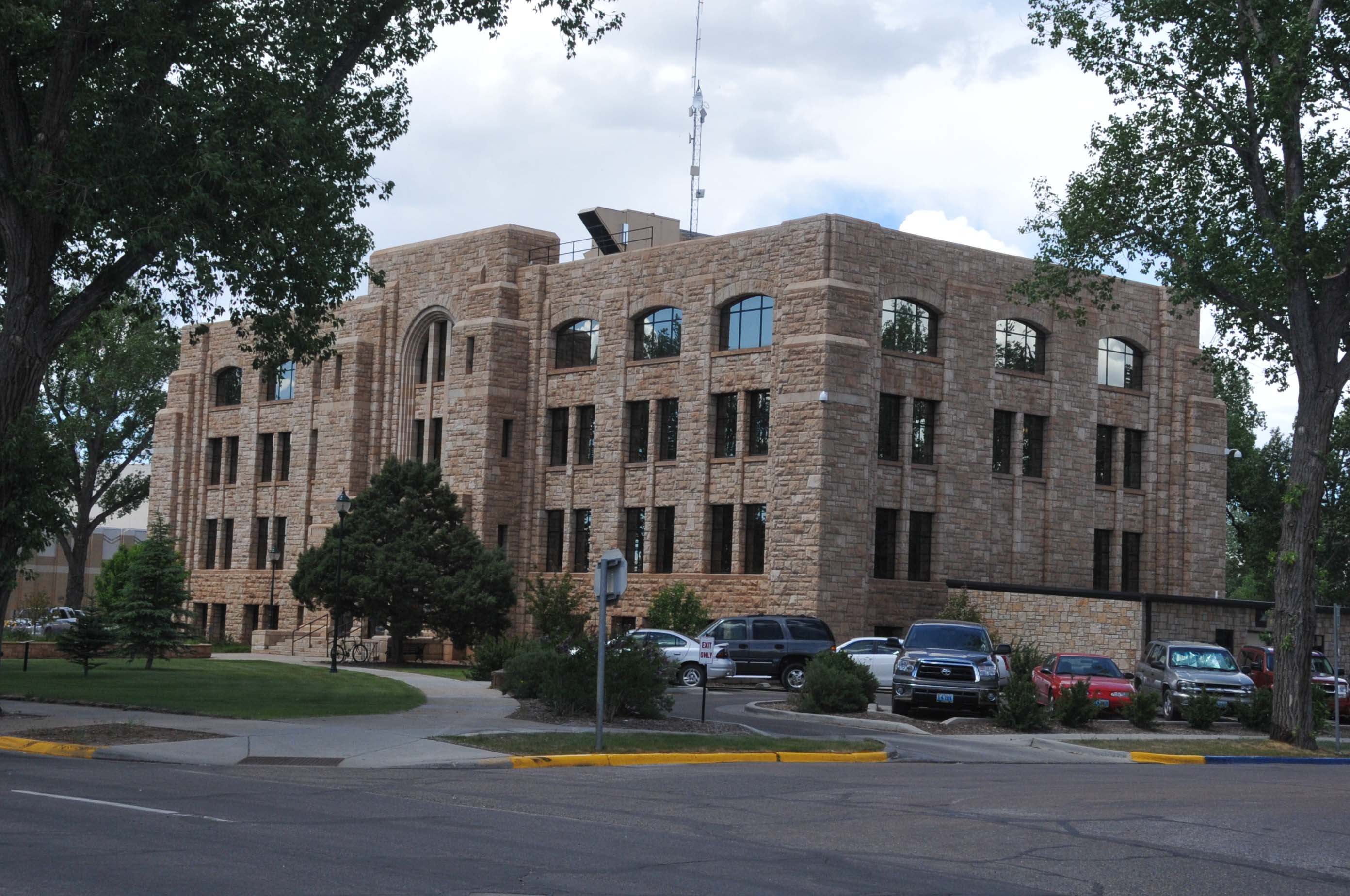
- Albany County Courthouse

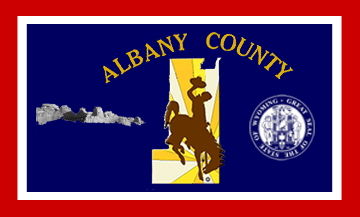
- Flag Logo

- Location within the U.S. state of Wyoming
- Coordinates: 41°39′N 105°44′W
- Country: United States
- State: Wyoming
- Founded: December 16, 1868
- Named for: Albany, New York
- Seat: Laramie
- Largest city: Laramie

Area
  - Total: 4,309 sq mi (11,160 km^{2})
  - Land: 4,274 sq mi (11,070 km^{2})
  - Water: 35 sq mi (91 km^{2}) 0.8%

Population (2020)
  - Total: 37,066
  - Estimate (2025): 38,558 ▲
  - Density: 8.672/sq mi (3.348/km^{2})
- Time zone: UTC−7 (Mountain)
  - Summer (DST): UTC−6 (MDT)
- Congressional district: At-large
- Website: www.albanycountywy.gov

Albany County (/ˈɔːlbəni/ AWL-bə-nee) is a county in the U.S. state of Wyoming. As of the 2020 United States census, the population was 37,066. Its county seat is Laramie, the site of the University of Wyoming. Its southern border lies on the northern Colorado state line. Albany County comprises the Laramie, WY Micropolitan Statistical Area. It is the fifth-most populous county in Wyoming.

== History ==
Albany County was organized in 1868 of territory removed from Laramie County in Dakota Territory, which at the time had jurisdiction over part of modern-day Wyoming. It became a county in Wyoming Territory when its government was formally organized on May 19, 1869.

Charles D. Bradley, a member of the legislature of the Dakota Territory named the county for Albany, New York, the capital of his native state. In 1875, the Wyoming Territorial legislature authorized portions of Albany County to be removed from the county to form Crook and Johnson counties, and in 1888 land was taken from Albany County for the creation of Converse County. Further adjustments were made to the county's boundary in 1911 and 1955.

== Geography ==
According to the U.S. Census Bureau, the county has a total area of 4,309 square miles (11,160 km^{2}), of which 4,274 square miles (11,070 km^{2}) is land and 35 square miles (91 km^{2}) (0.8%) is water.

=== Adjacent counties ===
- Converse County – north
- Platte County – northeast
- Laramie County – east
- Larimer County, Colorado – south
- Jackson County, Colorado – southwest
- Carbon County – west
- Natrona County – northwest

=== Transit ===
- University of Wyoming Transit System (Roundup)
- Greyhound Lines

=== Major highways ===
- Interstate 80
- I-80 BL
- U.S. Highway 30
- U.S. Highway 287
- Wyoming Highway 10
- Wyoming Highway 11
- Wyoming Highway 12
- Wyoming Highway 13
- Wyoming Highway 34
- Wyoming Highway 130
- Wyoming Highway 210
- Wyoming Highway 230

=== National protected areas ===
- Bamforth National Wildlife Refuge
- Hutton Lake National Wildlife Refuge
- Medicine Bow National Forest (part)
- Mortenson Lake National Wildlife Refuge

== Demographics ==
Historical population
Census	Pop.	Note	%±
1870	2,021		—
1880	4,626		128.9%
1890	8,865		91.6%
1900	13,084		47.6%
1910	11,574		−11.5%
1920	9,283		−19.8%
1930	12,041		29.7%
1940	13,946		15.8%
1950	19,055		36.6%
1960	21,290		11.7%
1970	26,431		24.1%
1980	29,062		10.0%
1990	30,797		6.0%
2000	32,014		4.0%
2010	36,299		13.4%
2020	37,066		2.1%
2025 (est.)	38,558	▲	4.0%
US Decennial Census; 1870–2000 2010–2020

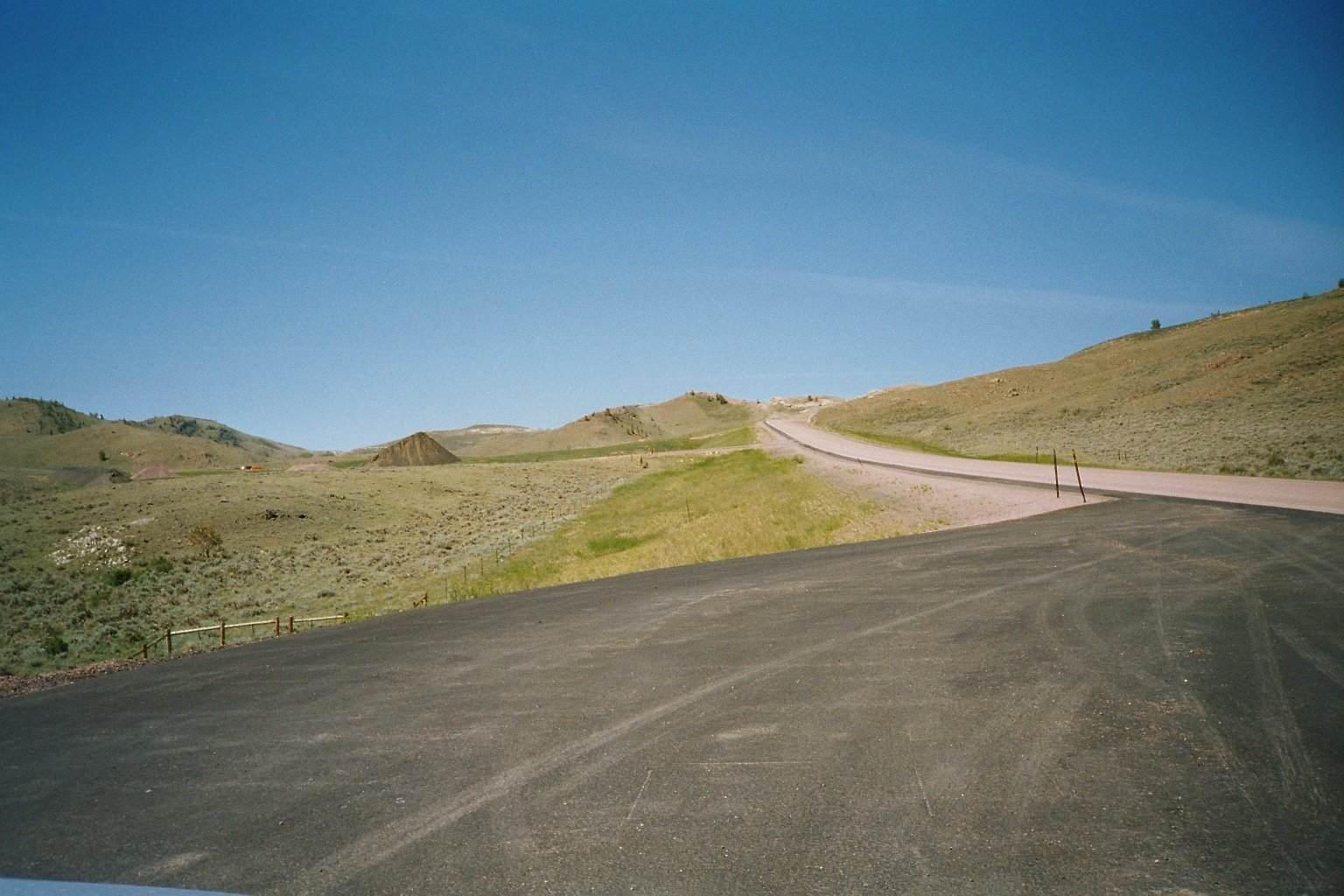
Morton Pass (SR34)

=== 2020 census ===
As of the 2020 census, the county had a population of 37,066. Of the residents, 16.8% were under the age of 18 and 13.1% were 65 years of age or older; the median age was 29.1 years. For every 100 females there were 106.7 males, and for every 100 females age 18 and over there were 106.9 males.

Albany County, Wyoming – Racial and ethnic composition Note: the US Census treats Hispanic/Latino as an ethnic category. This table excludes Latinos from the racial categories and assigns them to a separate category. Hispanics/Latinos may be of any race.
Race / Ethnicity (NH = Non-Hispanic)	Pop 2000	Pop 2010	Pop 2020	% 2000	% 2010	% 2020
White alone (NH)	28,003	30,796	29,584	87.49%	84.86%	79.81%
Black or African American alone (NH)	322	390	384	1.01%	1.07%	1.04%
Native American or Alaska Native alone (NH)	264	198	282	0.82%	0.65%	0.76%
Asian alone (NH)	539	1,005	1,028	1.68%	2.77%	2.77%
Pacific Islander alone (NH)	13	17	30	0.04%	0.05%	0.08%
Other race alone (NH)	35	48	188	0.11%	0.13%	0.51%
Mixed race or Multiracial (NH)	441	643	1,660	1.38%	1.83%	4.48%
Hispanic or Latino (any race)	2,397	3,202	3,910	7.47%	8.65%	10.55%
Total	32,014	36,299	37,066	100.00%	100.00%	100.00%

The racial makeup of the county was 83.4% White, 1.2% Black or African American, 1.1% American Indian and Alaska Native, 2.8% Asian, 3.4% from some other race, and 8.0% from two or more races. Hispanic or Latino residents of any race comprised 10.5% of the population.

There were 15,993 households in the county, of which 21.2% had children under the age of 18 living with them and 26.6% had a female householder with no spouse or partner present. About 36.7% of all households were made up of individuals and 9.0% had someone living alone who was 65 years of age or older.

There were 18,494 housing units, of which 13.5% were vacant. Among occupied housing units, 49.3% were owner-occupied and 50.7% were renter-occupied. The homeowner vacancy rate was 1.6% and the rental vacancy rate was 8.1%.

=== 2010 census ===
As of the 2010 United States census, there were 36,299 people, 15,691 households, and 7,430 families in the county. The population density was 8.5 people per square mile (3.3 people/km^{2}). There were 17,939 housing units at an average density of 4.2 units per square mile (1.6 units/km^{2}). The racial makeup of the county was 90.1% white, 2.8% Asian, 1.2% black or African American, 0.7% American Indian, 0.1% Pacific islander, 2.4% from other races, and 2.7% from two or more races. Those of Hispanic or Latino origin made up 8.8% of the population. In terms of ancestry, 31.2% were German, 15.3% were Irish, 12.5% were English, and 4.4% were American.

Of the 15,691 households, 21.0% had children under the age of 18 living with them, 36.9% were married couples living together, 6.7% had a female householder with no husband present, 52.6% were non-families, and 34.9% of all households were made up of individuals. The average household size was 2.17 and the average family size was 2.84. The median age was 26.8 years.

The median income for a household in the county was $42,890 and the median income for a family was $70,054. Males had a median income of $43,484 versus $33,512 for females. The per capita income for the county was $25,622. About 7.2% of families and 21.5% of the population were below the poverty line, including 10.7% of those under age 18 and 6.6% of those age 65 or over.

=== 2000 census ===
At the 2000 United States census, there were 32,014 people, 13,269 households and 7,006 families in the county. The population density was 8 people per square mile (3.1 people/km^{2}). There were 15,215 housing units at an average density of 4 units per square mile (1.5 units/km^{2}). The racial makeup of the county was 91.32% White, 1.11% Black or African American, 0.95% Native American, 1.7% Asian, 0.06% Pacific Islander, 2.65% from other races, and 2.22% from two or more races. 7.49% of the population were Hispanic or Latino of any race. 24.4% were of German, 11.1% English, 10.2% Irish and 6.1% American ancestry.

There were 13,269 households, of which 23.9% had children under the age of 18 living with them, 42.0% were married couples living together, 7.5% had a female householder with no husband present, and 47.2% were non-families. 31.4% of all households were made up of individuals, and 6.2% had someone living alone who was 65 years of age or older. The average household size was 2.23 and the average family size was 2.84.

The county population contained 18.4% of the population under the age of 18, 28.2% from 18 to 24, 26.1% from 25 to 44, 19.1% from 45 to 64, and 8.3% who were 65 years of age or older. The median age was 27 years. For every 100 females there were 106.7 males. For every 100 females age 18 and over, there were 106.4 males.

The median household income was $28,790 and the median family income was $44,334. Males had a median income of $31,087 compared with $22,061 for females. The per capita income for the county was $16,706. About 10.8% of families and 21.0% of the population were below the poverty line, including 15.7% of those under the age of 18 and 8.8% of those 65 and older were living below the poverty line.

== Communities ==
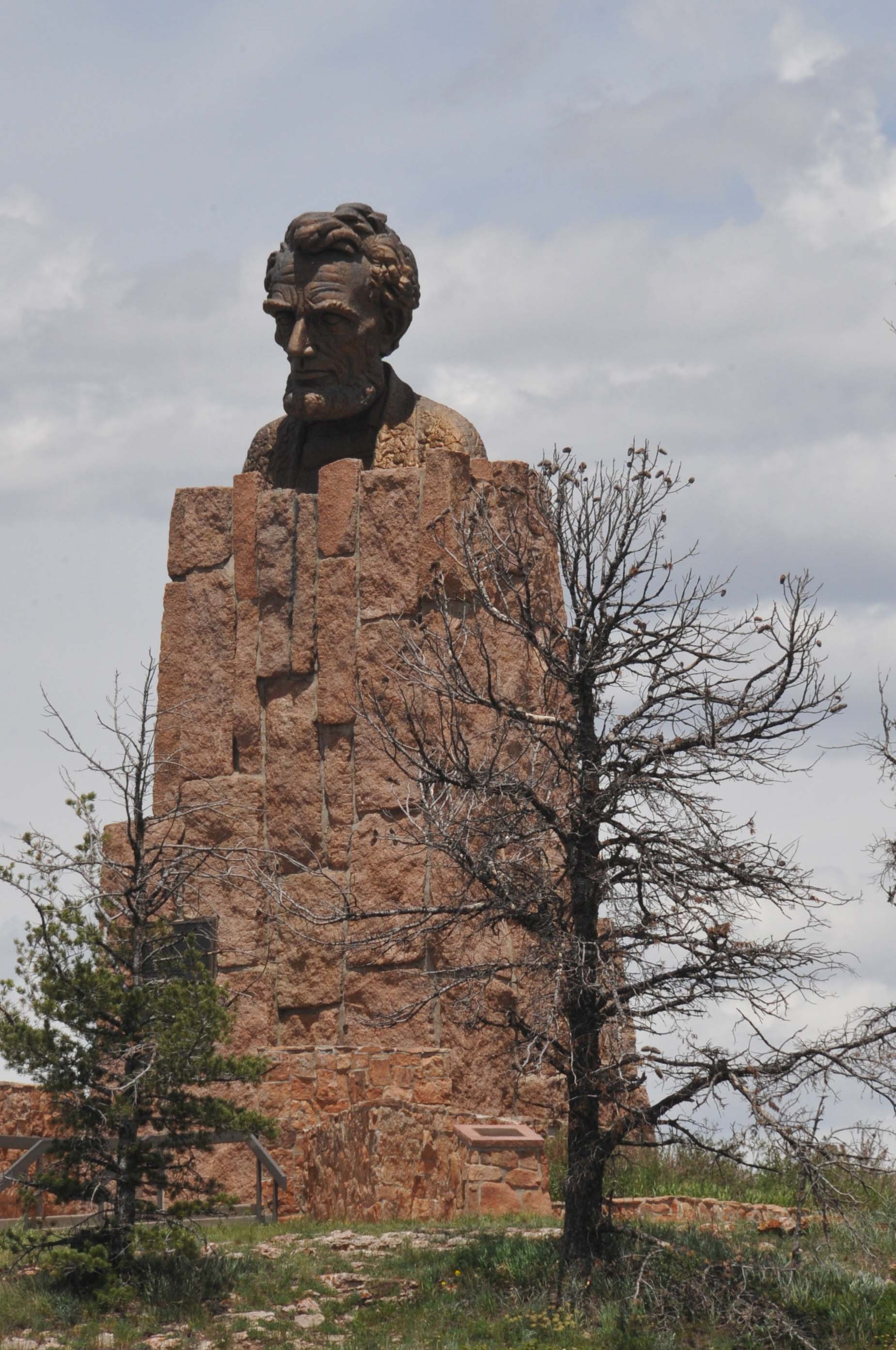
Lincoln Monument near Laramie

=== City ===
- Laramie (county seat)

=== Town ===
- Rock River

=== Census-designated places ===
- Albany
- Centennial
- Fox Park
- Woods Landing-Jelm

=== Unincorporated communities ===
- Barrett
- Binford
- Bosler
- Bosler Junction
- Buford
- Cooper Lake
- Dale Creek
- Deerwood
- Garrett
- Gramm
- Harmony
- Harper
- Hatton
- Hermosa
- Keystone
- Little Medicine
- Lookout
- Millbrook
- Mountain Home
- New Jelm
- PhinDeli
- Red Buttes
- Sherman
- The Buttes
- Tie Siding
- Toltec
- Wyocolo

== Politics ==
While Wyoming as a whole tends to be solidly Republican, Albany County is a swing county. It is one of only thirteen counties to have voted for Barack Obama in 2008, Mitt Romney in 2012, Donald Trump in 2016, and Joe Biden in 2020. (Note: The other twelve are Butte County, California; Teton County, Idaho; Kent County, Maryland; Kendall County, Illinois; McLean County, Illinois; Tippecanoe County, Indiana; Kent County, Michigan; Leelanau County, Michigan; Carroll County, New Hampshire; Rockingham County, New Hampshire; Marion County, Oregon; and Grand County, Utah.) It is also a national bellwether, only failing to back the nationwide winner on four occasions in its history (1892, 1960, 1976, and 2012).

Since the 1990s, Albany County has been one of the few competitive counties in heavily Republican Wyoming. Laramie, home of the University of Wyoming, is solidly Democratic, while the Laramie suburbs and the county's rural precincts are equally solidly Republican. Laramie accounts for roughly half of the county's population, with the Laramie suburbs and the rural precincts of the county forming the other approximate half. Thus, swing voters typically determine the county's winner.

United States presidential election results for Albany County, Wyoming
Year	Republican		Democratic		Third party(ies)	
Year	No.	%	No.	%	No.	%
1892	1,100	49.48%	0	0.00%	1,123	50.52%
1896	1,220	52.70%	1,073	46.35%	22	0.95%
1900	1,540	60.61%	1,001	39.39%	0	0.00%
1904	1,674	63.41%	706	26.74%	260	9.85%
1908	1,335	49.74%	1,152	42.92%	197	7.34%
1912	882	32.75%	1,044	38.77%	767	28.48%
1916	1,313	43.84%	1,571	52.45%	111	3.71%
1920	1,769	59.16%	1,145	38.29%	76	2.54%
1924	2,164	47.72%	743	16.38%	1,628	35.90%
1928	2,941	64.13%	1,618	35.28%	27	0.59%
1932	2,281	43.13%	2,665	50.39%	343	6.49%
1936	1,777	32.08%	3,685	66.53%	77	1.39%
1940	2,756	40.51%	4,018	59.05%	30	0.44%
1944	2,970	47.91%	3,229	52.09%	0	0.00%
1948	2,858	47.28%	3,141	51.96%	46	0.76%
1952	4,560	59.59%	3,082	40.28%	10	0.13%
1956	4,315	55.88%	3,407	44.12%	0	0.00%
1960	4,356	50.43%	4,282	49.57%	0	0.00%
1964	2,923	32.69%	6,019	67.31%	0	0.00%
1968	4,422	48.71%	4,079	44.93%	578	6.37%
1972	7,021	58.92%	4,873	40.89%	23	0.19%
1976	6,734	57.94%	4,663	40.12%	225	1.94%
1980	5,830	50.58%	3,772	32.72%	1,925	16.70%
1984	7,452	60.36%	4,708	38.13%	186	1.51%
1988	5,653	49.87%	5,486	48.40%	196	1.73%
1992	4,176	32.46%	5,713	44.40%	2,978	23.14%
1996	5,967	42.82%	6,399	45.92%	1,570	11.27%
2000	7,814	55.22%	5,069	35.82%	1,268	8.96%
2004	9,006	54.17%	7,117	42.81%	501	3.01%
2008	7,936	46.36%	8,644	50.50%	537	3.14%
2012	7,866	48.26%	7,458	45.75%	976	5.99%
2016	7,602	44.56%	6,890	40.39%	2,568	15.05%
2020	8,579	46.08%	9,092	48.84%	946	5.08%
2024	8,930	49.95%	8,371	46.83%	576	3.22%

== Education ==
There is one school district in Albany County: Albany County School District 1.

== See also ==
- Albany County Sheriff's Office (Wyoming)
- National Register of Historic Places listings in Albany County, Wyoming
- Mortenson Lake National Wildlife Refuge, the last home of the Wyoming toad, located in southern Albany County
- Wyoming
  - List of cities and towns in Wyoming
  - List of counties in Wyoming
  - Wyoming statistical areas
