= List of counties in Wyoming =

Counties of Wyoming
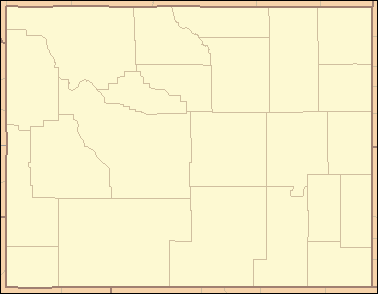
- Location: State of Wyoming
- Number: 23
- Populations: 2,341 (Niobrara) – 102,938 (Laramie)
- Areas: 2,004 square miles (5,190 km^{2}) (Hot Springs) – 10,426 square miles (27,000 km^{2}) (Sweetwater)
- Government: County government
- Subdivisions: Cities, towns, townships, unincorporated communities, Indian reservations, census-designated places

There are 23 counties in the U.S. state of Wyoming. There were originally five counties in the Wyoming Territory: Laramie and Carter, established in 1867; Carbon and Albany established in 1868; and Uinta, an annexed portion of Utah and Idaho, extending from Montana (including Yellowstone Park) to the Wyoming–Utah boundary. On July 10, 1890, Wyoming was admitted to the Union with thirteen counties in it. Ten more counties were created after statehood.

Two counties were renamed after their creation. Carter County was renamed Sweetwater County on December 1, 1869. Pease County, formed in 1875, was renamed Johnson County in 1879.

The Federal Information Processing Standard (FIPS) code, which is used by the United States government to uniquely identify states and counties, is provided with each entry. Wyoming's code is 56, which when combined with any county code would be written as 56XXX. The FIPS code for each county links to census data for that county.

== List ==
County	FIPS code	County seat	Est.	Formed from	Etymology	Population	Area	Map
Albany County	001	Laramie	December 16, 1868	One of the original five counties.	City of Albany, New York, from which early settlers hailed.	38,558	4,274 sq mi (11,070 km^{2})	State map highlighting Albany County
Big Horn County	003	Basin	March 12, 1890	Parts of Sheridan County, Johnson County, and Fremont County.	Big Horn Mountains, a mountain range extending into northern Wyoming	12,024	3,137 sq mi (8,125 km^{2})	State map highlighting Big Horn County
Campbell County	005	Gillette	February 21, 1911	Parts of Weston County and Crook County.	John Allen Campbell (1835–80), first governor of the Wyoming Territory (1869–75)	48,145	4,797 sq mi (12,424 km^{2})	State map highlighting Campbell County
Carbon County	007	Rawlins	December 16, 1868	One of the original five counties.	The vast coal beds in the county.	14,013	7,897 sq mi (20,453 km^{2})	State map highlighting Carbon County
Converse County	009	Douglas	March 9, 1888	Parts of Albany County and Laramie County.	Amasa Rice Converse (1842–1885), a banker and rancher from Cheyenne, Wyoming.	13,824	4,255 sq mi (11,020 km^{2})	State map highlighting Converse County
Crook County	011	Sundance	December 8, 1875	Parts of Laramie County and Albany County.	General George Crook (1828–90), who served in the American Civil War and the Indian Wars.	7,852	2,859 sq mi (7,405 km^{2})	State map highlighting Crook County
Fremont County	013	Lander	March 5, 1884	Part of Sweetwater County.	John C. Frémont (1813–90), explorer, U.S. Senator for California, and the first presidential candidate of a major party to run on a platform in opposition to slavery	39,464	9,183 sq mi (23,784 km^{2})	State map highlighting Fremont County
Goshen County	015	Torrington	February 21, 1911	Part of Laramie County.	The Land of Goshen, a Biblical paradise.	12,640	2,225 sq mi (5,763 km^{2})	State map highlighting Goshen County
Hot Springs County	017	Thermopolis	February 21, 1911	Parts of Fremont County, Big Horn County, and Park County.	The hot springs at Thermopolis within the county borders.	4,600	2,004 sq mi (5,190 km^{2})	State map highlighting Hot Springs County
Johnson County	019	Buffalo	December 8, 1875	Parts of Carbon County and Sweetwater County.	Edward P. Johnson (1843–1879), a lawyer from Cheyenne, Wyoming. (Initial name, Pease County, named for E. L. Pease, President of the Territorial Legislative Council.)	8,908	4,166 sq mi (10,790 km^{2})	State map highlighting Johnson County
Laramie County	021	Cheyenne	January 9, 1867	One of the original five counties.	Jacques La Ramee (1785?–1821), a French-Canadian fur trapper.	102,938	2,686 sq mi (6,957 km^{2})	State map highlighting Laramie County
Lincoln County	023	Kemmerer	February 21, 1911	Part of Uinta County.	Abraham Lincoln (1809–65), U.S. President (1861–65)	21,180	4,069 sq mi (10,539 km^{2})	State map highlighting Lincoln County
Natrona County	025	Casper	March 9, 1888	Part of Carbon County.	The natron, or soda deposits found within the county's borders. Natrona means natron in Spanish.	80,526	5,340 sq mi (13,831 km^{2})	State map highlighting Natrona County
Niobrara County	027	Lusk	February 21, 1911	Part of Converse County.	The Niobrara River, which flows through the state. Niobrara is Omaha for flat or broad river.	2,341	2,626 sq mi (6,801 km^{2})	State map highlighting Niobrara County
Park County	029	Cody	February 15, 1909	Part of Big Horn County.	Yellowstone National Park	31,171	6,943 sq mi (17,982 km^{2})	State map highlighting Park County
Platte County	031	Wheatland	February 21, 1911	Part of Laramie County.	North Platte River. Plate is French for flat.	8,634	2,085 sq mi (5,400 km^{2})	State map highlighting Platte County
Sheridan County	033	Sheridan	March 9, 1888	Part of Johnson County.	Philip Sheridan (1831–88), American Civil War general.	33,241	2,523 sq mi (6,535 km^{2})	State map highlighting Sheridan County
Sublette County	035	Pinedale	February 15, 1921	Parts of Fremont County and Lincoln County.	William Sublette, pioneer and fur trapper.	8,929	4,882 sq mi (12,644 km^{2})	State map highlighting Sublette County
Sweetwater County	037	Green River	December 27, 1867	One of the original five counties.	Sweetwater River (a tributary of the North Platte River), which flows through the state. (Original name, Carter County, named for sutler William Alexander Carter.)	41,267	10,426 sq mi (27,003 km^{2})	State map highlighting Sweetwater County
Teton County	039	Jackson	February 15, 1921	Part of Lincoln County.	Teton Range, a small mountain range of the Rocky Mountains at the Wyoming–Idaho state line	23,333	4,008 sq mi (10,381 km^{2})	State map highlighting Teton County
Uinta County	041	Evanston	December 1, 1869	One of the original five counties.	The Uinta Mountains, named in turn after the Uintah Native American people.	20,728	2,082 sq mi (5,392 km^{2})	State map highlighting Uinta County
Washakie County	043	Worland	February 21, 1911	Part of Big Horn County.	Washakie (1804–1900), a leader of Shoshone Native American tribe.	7,597	2,240 sq mi (5,802 km^{2})	State map highlighting Washakie County
Weston County	045	Newcastle	March 12, 1890	Part of Crook County	John Weston (1831–95), who was responsible for bringing the first railroad to the area.	6,840	2,398 sq mi (6,211 km^{2})	State map highlighting Weston County

== Racial / Ethnic Profile of counties in Wyoming (2020 Census) ==
Racial / Ethnic Profile of counties in Wyoming (2020 Census)
Following is a table of counties in Wyoming by race/ethnicity. The majority racial/ethnic group is coded per the key below.

Majority minority with no dominant group
Majority White
Majority Black
Majority Hispanic
Majority Asian
Majority Native American

Racial and ethnic composition of counties in Wyoming (2020 Census) (NH = Non-Hispanic) Note: the US Census treats Hispanic/Latino as an ethnic category. This table excludes Latinos from the racial categories and assigns them to a separate category. Hispanics/Latinos may be of any race.
County	Location of County	Total Population	White alone (NH)	%	Black or African American alone (NH)	%	Native American or Alaska Native alone (NH)	%	Asian alone (NH)	%	Pacific Islander alone (NH)	%	Other race alone (NH)	%	Mixed race or Multiracial (NH)	%	Hispanic or Latino (any race)	%
Albany		37,066	29,584	79.81%	384	1.04%	282	0.76%	1,028	2.77%	30	0.08%	188	0.51%	1,660	4.48%	3,910	10.55%
Big Horn		11,521	9,884	85.79%	22	0.19%	98	0.85%	44	0.38%	6	0.05%	44	0.38%	354	3.07%	1,069	9.28%
Campbell		47,026	39,601	84.21%	219	0.47%	509	1.08%	320	0.68%	25	0.05%	188	0.40%	1,881	4.00%	4,283	9.11%
Carbon		14,537	11,006	75.71%	130	0.89%	155	1.07%	89	0.61%	15	0.10%	60	0.41%	482	3.32%	2,600	17.89%
Converse		13,751	11,996	87.24%	39	0.28%	72	0.52%	55	0.40%	0	0.00%	41	0.30%	486	3.53%	1,062	7.72%
Crook		7,181	6,766	94.22%	0	0.00%	43	0.60%	9	0.13%	7	0.10%	16	0.22%	228	3.18%	112	1.56%
Fremont		39,234	26,586	67.76%	166	0.42%	7,798	19.88%	205	0.52%	7	0.02%	136	0.35%	1,915	4.88%	2,421	6.17%
Goshen		12,498	10,695	85.57%	76	0.61%	83	0.66%	46	0.37%	0	0.00%	42	0.34%	344	2.75%	1,212	9.70%
Hot Springs		4,621	4,142	89.63%	9	0.19%	42	0.91%	18	0.39%	3	0.06%	16	0.35%	214	4.63%	177	3.83%
Johnson		8,447	7,640	90.45%	26	0.31%	69	0.82%	15	0.18%	7	0.08%	28	0.33%	315	3.73%	347	4.11%
Laramie		100,512	75,279	74.90%	2,200	2.19%	596	0.59%	1,228	1.22%	136	0.14%	518	0.52%	4,953	4.93%	15,602	15.52%
Lincoln		19,581	17,737	90.58%	34	0.17%	101	0.52%	96	0.49%	21	0.11%	91	0.46%	542	2.77%	959	4.90%
Natrona		79,955	66,614	83.31%	729	0.91%	767	0.96%	633	0.79%	78	0.10%	306	0.38%	3,659	4.58%	7,169	8.97%
Niobrara		2,467	2,255	91.41%	6	0.24%	27	1.09%	12	0.49%	5	0.20%	0	0.00%	86	3.49%	76	3.08%
Park		29,624	26,316	88.83%	59	0.20%	120	0.41%	211	0.71%	17	0.06%	148	0.50%	1,056	3.56%	1,697	5.73%
Platte		8,605	7,469	86.80%	19	0.22%	67	0.78%	43	0.50%	4	0.05%	33	0.38%	275	3.20%	695	8.08%
Sheridan		30,921	27,509	88.97%	110	0.36%	324	1.05%	180	0.58%	17	0.05%	126	0.41%	1,239	4.01%	1,416	4.58%
Sublette		8,728	7,651	87.66%	17	0.19%	44	0.50%	46	0.53%	10	0.11%	45	0.52%	279	3.20%	636	7.29%
Sweetwater		42,272	32,362	76.56%	351	0.83%	259	0.61%	283	0.67%	61	0.14%	147	0.35%	1,852	4.38%	6,957	16.46%
Teton		23,331	18,754	80.38%	49	0.21%	66	0.28%	309	1.32%	3	0.01%	99	0.42%	756	3.24%	3,295	14.12%
Uinta		20,450	17,444	85.30%	50	0.24%	122	0.60%	108	0.53%	27	0.13%	76	0.37%	637	3.11%	1,986	9.71%
Washakie		7,685	6,268	81.56%	12	0.16%	45	0.59%	33	0.43%	1	0.01%	43	0.56%	213	2.77%	1,070	13.92%
Weston		6,838	6,106	89.30%	28	0.41%	92	1.35%	26	0.38%	9	0.13%	34	0.50%	248	3.63%	295	4.31%
