= Big Horn Academy Building =

Coordinates: 44°52′56.93″N 108°28′7.25″W

- Big Horn Academy Historic District
- U.S. National Register of Historic Places
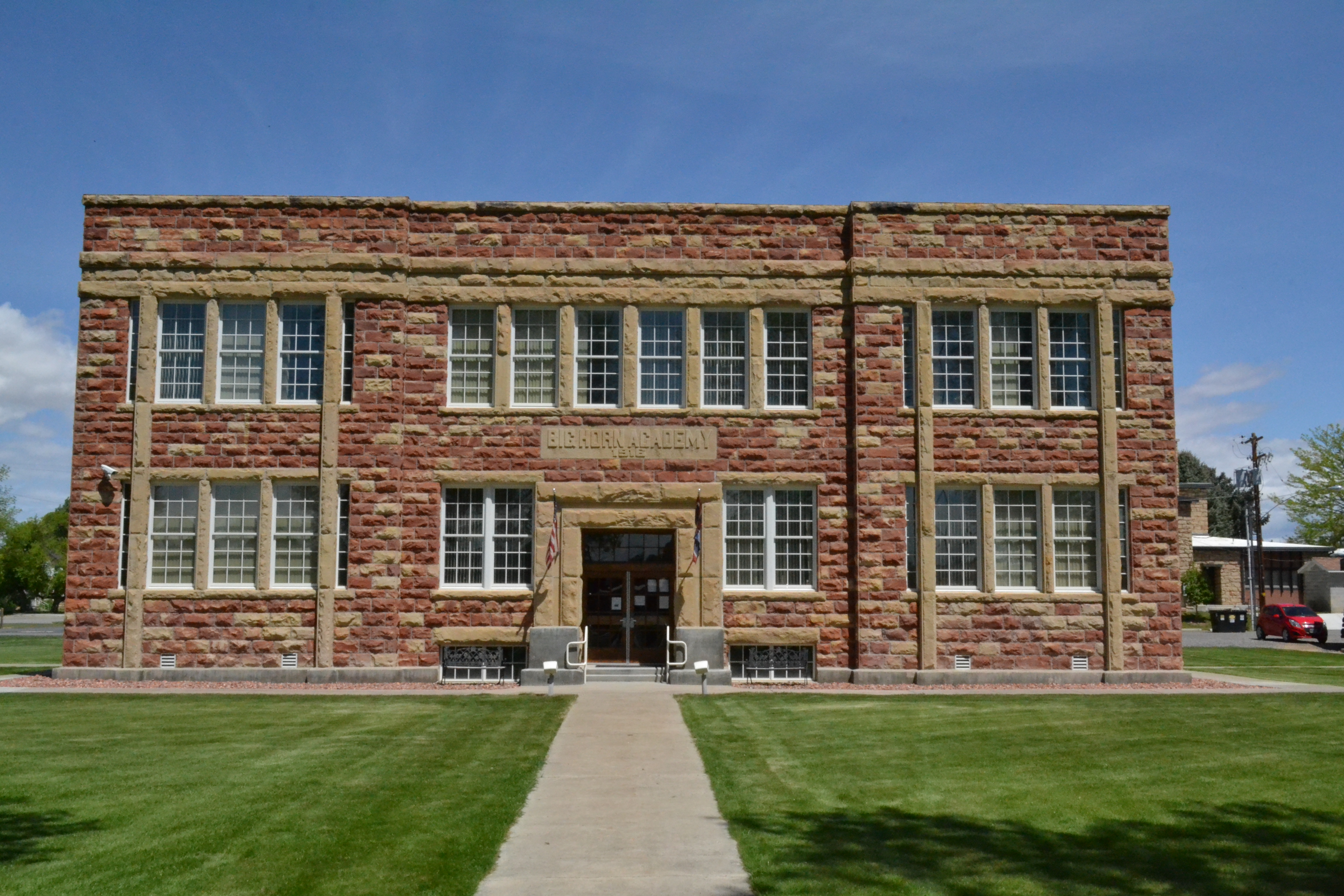
- Location: Cowley, Wyoming
- Built: 1916
- Architect: Works Progress Administration (1936 gymnasium)
- Architectural style: Romanesque
- NRHP reference No.: 92000285
- Added to NRHP: March 26, 1992

The Big Horn Academy Building was built in 1916. It is located in Cowley, Wyoming, United States. It served as a high school and junior college for the students who lived in the Bighorn Basin.

The academy was started in 1907 by the Church of Jesus Christ of Latter-day Saints. The school was initially planned to be an academy offering not only high school programs, but also more advanced academics. The initial plan was to rotate the academy between the towns of Cowley, Lovell, and Byron. However, the school never moved beyond Cowley, so the church decided to build a permanent building. The main building, of rusticated sandstone, was completed in 1916. It operated as a church school until 1924, when it became part of the public school system. A gymnasium, built of lodgepole pine, was added in 1936, being built by the Works Progress Administration.

The school building was used until 1985. At that time the students from Cowley High School began attending Rocky Mountain High School in Byron. Between 1985 and 2011 it was used as a preschool, and housed a number of small businesses. In 2011 it was remodeled and now holds the administrative offices for Big Horn County School District #1.
