= Otto, Wyoming =

- Unincorporated community
- Location within the state of Wyoming Otto, Wyoming (the United States)
- Coordinates: 44°24′12″N 108°16′27″W
- Country: United States
- State: Wyoming
- County: Big Horn
- Elevation: 4,167 ft (1,270 m)

Population (2000)
  - Total: 50
- Time zone: UTC-7 (Mountain (MST))
  - Summer (DST): UTC-6 (MDT)
- ZIP codes: 82434
- Area code: 307
- GNIS feature ID: 1592503

Otto is an unincorporated community in Big Horn County in the U.S. state of Wyoming. It was named for Otto Franc, a local cattle baron, sheriff and judge in the Big Horn Basin. The community is located along the Greybull River on Wyoming Highway 30 between Basin and Burlington.

Public education in the community of Otto is provided by Big Horn County School District #1. Children attend Burlington Elementary School (grades PK-6), Burlington Junior High School (grades 7–8), and Burlington High School (grades 9–12). All three campuses are located in the nearby town of Burlington.
