= Fenton, Wyoming =

- Unincorporated community
- Location within the state of Wyoming Fenton, Wyoming (the United States)
- Coordinates: 44°23′53″N 108°34′28″W
- Country: United States
- State: Wyoming
- County: Big Horn, Park County
- Elevation: 4,712 ft (1,436 m)
- Time zone: UTC-7 (Mountain (MST))
  - Summer (DST): UTC-6 (MDT)
- ZIP codes: 82434
- Area code: 307
- GNIS feature ID: 1597311

Fenton is an unincorporated community in Big Horn and Park counties in the U.S. state of Wyoming.
