= Burlington High School =

Burlington High School may refer to:

- Burlington High School (Iowa), in Burlington, Iowa
- Burlington High School (Kansas), in Burlington, Kansas
- Burlington High School (Massachusetts), in Burlington, Massachusetts
- Burlington High School (Vermont), in Burlington, Vermont
- Burlington High School (Wisconsin), in Burlington, Wisconsin
- Burlington High School (Wyoming) in Burlington, Wyoming

== See also ==
- Burlington Catholic Central High School
- Burlington Central High School
- Burlington City High School
- Burlington College
- Burlington Township High School
- Burlington-Edison High School
- Northern Burlington County Regional High School
