= 1976 United States presidential election in Wyoming =

- November 2, 1976

Nominee	Gerald Ford	Jimmy Carter
Party	Republican	Democratic
Home state	Michigan	Georgia
Running mate	Bob Dole	Walter Mondale
Electoral vote	3	0
Popular vote	92,717	62,239
Percentage	59.30%	39.81%
County results
Ford
50–60%
60–70%
70–80%
Carter
50–60%
President before election
Gerald Ford
Republican
Elected President
Jimmy Carter
Democratic

The 1976 United States presidential election in Wyoming took place on November 2, 1976, as part of the 1976 United States presidential election. Voters chose three representatives, or electors, to the Electoral College, who voted for president and vice president.

Wyoming was won by incumbent President Gerald Ford (R–Michigan), with 59.30% of the popular vote, against Jimmy Carter (D–Georgia), with 39.81% of the popular vote. Carter's vote would be the highest percent received by a Democrat since Lyndon Johnson's victory 1964, and to date, remains the highest percentage a Democrat has received in the period since then (Bill Clinton came closer to winning the state in terms of margin of victory in 1992 and 1996, though with a reduced percentage due to the strong third party candidacy of Ross Perot). Despite losing in Wyoming, Carter went on to win the national election and became the 39th president of the United States. With 59.3 percent of the popular vote, Wyoming would prove to be Ford's third strongest state in the 1976 election after neighboring Utah and Idaho. This was the first time Laramie County voted for a losing candidate since 1892.

== Results ==
1976 United States presidential election in Wyoming
Party	Candidate	Votes	%
Republican	Gerald Ford (inc.)	92,717	59.30%
Democratic	Jimmy Carter	62,239	39.81%
Write-in	Eugene McCarthy	624	0.40%
Write-in	Various	354	0.23%
Write-in	Thomas J. Anderson	290	0.19%
Write-in	Roger MacBride	89	0.06%
Write-in	Lester Maddox	30	0.02%
Total votes		156,343	100.00%

=== Results by county ===
County	Gerald Ford Republican		Jimmy Carter Democratic		Other candidates Write-ins		Margin		Total votes cast
County	#	%	#	%	#	%	#	%	Total votes cast
Albany	6,734	57.94%	4,663	40.12%	225	1.94%	2,071	17.82%	11,622
Big Horn	3,117	65.66%	1,618	34.08%	12	0.25%	1,499	31.58%	4,747
Campbell	3,306	66.19%	1,620	32.43%	69	1.38%	1,686	33.76%	4,995
Carbon	3,556	54.01%	3,010	45.72%	18	0.27%	546	8.29%	6,584
Converse	2,188	65.37%	1,150	34.36%	9	0.27%	1,038	31.01%	3,347
Crook	1,438	67.23%	653	30.53%	48	2.24%	785	36.70%	2,139
Fremont	6,584	59.51%	4,423	39.98%	56	0.51%	2,161	19.53%	11,063
Goshen	2,764	54.86%	2,262	44.90%	12	0.24%	502	9.96%	5,038
Hot Springs	1,413	59.39%	958	40.27%	8	0.34%	455	19.12%	2,379
Johnson	2,042	71.25%	797	27.81%	27	0.94%	1,245	43.44%	2,866
Laramie	14,061	53.48%	12,040	45.79%	193	0.73%	2,021	7.69%	26,294
Lincoln	2,464	60.93%	1,555	38.45%	25	0.62%	909	22.48%	4,044
Natrona	13,761	60.83%	8,640	38.19%	220	0.97%	5,121	22.64%	22,621
Niobrara	1,042	70.55%	427	28.91%	8	0.54%	615	41.64%	1,477
Park	5,878	68.33%	2,656	30.88%	68	0.79%	3,222	37.45%	8,602
Platte	1,844	53.45%	1,593	46.17%	13	0.38%	251	7.28%	3,450
Sheridan	5,382	62.21%	3,206	37.06%	64	0.74%	2,176	25.15%	8,652
Sublette	1,284	70.32%	528	28.92%	14	0.77%	756	41.40%	1,826
Sweetwater	4,937	46.69%	5,575	52.72%	62	0.59%	-638	-6.03%	10,574
Teton	2,667	67.40%	1,204	30.43%	86	2.17%	1,463	36.97%	3,957
Uinta	2,124	55.73%	1,559	40.91%	128	3.36%	565	14.82%	3,811
Washakie	2,361	66.68%	1,168	32.99%	12	0.34%	1,193	33.69%	3,541
Weston	1,770	65.22%	934	34.41%	10	0.37%	836	30.81%	2,714
Totals	92,717	59.30%	62,239	39.81%	1,387	0.89%	30,478	19.49%	156,343

==== Counties that flipped from Republican to Democratic ====
- Sweetwater

== See also ==
- United States presidential elections in Wyoming
