= Frannie, Wyoming =

- Town
- Location of Frannie in Big Horn County, Wyoming
- Coordinates: 44°58′16″N 108°37′23″W
- Country: United States
- State: Wyoming
- Counties: Big Horn, Park
- Incorporated: June 29, 1954

Area
  - Total: 0.44 sq mi (1.15 km^{2})
  - Land: 0.44 sq mi (1.15 km^{2})
  - Water: 0 sq mi (0.00 km^{2})
- Elevation: 4,223 ft (1,287 m)

Population (2020)
  - Total: 145
  - Density: 328.8/sq mi (126.96/km^{2})
- Time zone: UTC-7 (Mountain (MST))
  - Summer (DST): UTC-6 (MDT)
- ZIP code: 82423
- Area code: 307
- FIPS code: 56-29825
- GNIS feature ID: 2412654

Frannie is a town in Big Horn and Park counties in the U.S. state of Wyoming. The population was 145 at the 2020 census.

Frannie bills itself as the "Biggest little town in Wyoming".

== History ==
William A. "Jack" Morris arrived in 1886 and established the Morris Ranch. It was along the wagon route between Billings, Montana and Lander, Wyoming. The ranch became a wayside lodge for cattlemen and cowboys. In 1888 Morris had a daughter, Frannie.

In 1894, Morris established a post office at his ranch and named it for his daughter. The settlement had around 25 residents at the time. In 1900 the Chicago, Burlington and Quincy Railroad reached Frannie.

Until 1954, the legal status of Frannie was that of an unincorporated area taking in parts of Big Horn and Park Counties. In 1954, the town was incorporated. Under Wyoming law (WS 15-3-101), Frannie now has the status of an incorporated town having less than 4,000 people.

=== Frannie Morris ===
Frannie Morris became well known by travelers as she emulated frontier women like Calamity Jane and Annie Oakley. Whenever Buffalo Bill visited the ranch, he would ask to have her in his Wild West show but her father refused. She rode bareback and shot guns. She was also considered to be a beauty. Her father did not like young men's attention toward his daughter and would have them packed onto a train out of town.

In 1907 she became interested in Robert McFarland. The night he was put on a train she was gone in the morning. Her father spread the message to search for his daughter. Her disappearance became national headlines. After three weeks she turned up in Lewistown, Montana. Frannie claimed to have ridden 700 miles through multiple states to reach the town where she and McFarland agreed to meet. Her tale included snow in Bridger Pass, surviving meeting a bear, and finding shelter where she could. The two were married and with her father's consent the two began a horseback ride back to Frannie.

Outside of town McFarland was thrown from his horse, broke his hip, and the two returned to Lewistown and the hospital. Frannie stayed by his side until he recovered and the two took a train to Wyoming. When the train stopped in Frannie, she told him not to follow.

Frannie ended up marrying two more times. Her last marriage, to Russell Ford, lasted for fifty years. When her father died in 1935, she moved to Montana. She died in Kalispell, Montana.

== Geography ==
US Highway 310 (locally known as "Ash St.") is the main road through the town. All but 19 of the town's population is found east of US 310. The town is also located two miles south of the Montana border and is the northernmost town in Wyoming's Bighorn Basin—a mountain desert region which relies on a network of canals and pipelines to provide irrigation and potable water for the population, farming, and ranching activities.

According to the United States Census Bureau, the town has a total area of 0.44 square miles (1.14 km^{2}), all land. The Town boundaries, at its eastern end, follow the Sage/Frannie Creek.

Among Wyoming towns Frannie has a unique geographic characteristic: it is the only town having boundaries which include parts of two counties—Big Horn (pop. 138) and Park (pop. 19). Accordingly, visitors to Frannie are greeted with a welcoming sign which includes the phrase "Biggest Little Town In Wyoming." Locals say this designation is because "it took two counties to hold our town!" Included in the Park County portion of Frannie is the post office and two of the town's three businesses. The Town Hall is located within the Big Horn County portion.

== Demographics ==
Historical population
Census	Pop.	Note	%±
1960	171		—
1970	139		−18.7%
1980	138		−0.7%
1990	148		7.2%
2000	209		41.2%
2010	157		−24.9%
2020	145		−7.6%
2024 (est.)	146	▲	0.7%
U.S. Decennial Census

=== 2010 census ===
As of the census of 2010, there were 157 people, 70 households, and 50 families residing in the town. There were 77 housing units. The racial makeup of the town was 95.5% White, 1.9% Native American, 1.9% African-American, 0% Asian, 0% from other races, and 0% from two or more races. Hispanic or Latino of any race were 7.6% of the population. Some individuals identified as more than one race. Thus these figures add-up to more than 100%.

Of the town's 70 households 30% had children under the age of 18 living with them, 54.3% were married couples living together, 14.3% had a female householder with no husband present, and 28.6% were non-families. 1.4% of all households had someone living alone who was 65 years of age or older. The average household size was 2.24 and the average family size was 2.64.

In the town, the population was spread out, with 24.8% under the age of 20, 7% from 20 to 29, 19.8% from 30 to 44, 31.8% from 45 to 64, and 16.5% who were 65 years of age or older. The median age was 43.3 years.

== Government ==
The town has a mayor-council government in which the governing body comprises the mayor and the council, together. There are four council members. The mayor and council are non-partisan positions with a four-year term.

The governing body has authority over the budget, other fiscal matters, and other major issues affecting the town. The current mayor is Garret Frescoln, whose current term expires in 2026.

== Arts and culture ==
Frannie has a public library, a branch of the Big Horn County Library System.

== Education ==
Public education in the town of Frannie is provided by Big Horn County School District #1. Campuses include Rocky Mountain Elementary School (grades PK-5) and Rocky Mountain High School (grades 6-12). Both campuses are located in Cowley.

== Infrastructure ==
Frannie receives natural gas service from Frannie-Deaver Utilities, a privately held company in Frannie. Since 1955 the town has provided municipal (potable) water service. In 2000 the town installed a sanitary sewer system. The town contracts for its trash collection and fire-fighting services. Fire protection is provided by the Big Horn County Fire District #5 in Deaver, Wyoming. Police coverage is provided primarily by the Big Horn County Sheriff's Office.

== Media ==
=== AM radio ===
- KPOW 1260 AM Country

=== FM radio ===
- KTAG 97.9 FM Adult Contemporary
- KMXE 99.3 FM Classic rock
- KZMQ-FM 100.3 Country
- KCGL 104.1 Classic rock
- KROW 107.1 Classic Hits

=== Television ===
Three television stations are available in Frannie: KSVI (ABC,) KTVQ (CBS) and KULR (NBC) from Billings. Reception of additional TV stations is available, by subscription, from TCT West Telephone of Basin, Wyo. and from satellite ("dish") services.
