= Big Horn County School District Number 1 =

School district in Wyoming, US

Address
- P.O. Box 688 Cowley, Wyoming; United States

District information
- Superintendent: Ben Smith
- Schools: 6
- NCES District ID: 5601420

Students and staff
- Students: 1247
- Teachers: 85.98 FTE

Other information
- Website: https://www.bighorn1.com/

Big Horn County School District #1 is a public school district based in Cowley, Wyoming, United States. The superintendent is Ben Smith. The district was consolidated in the 1980s from smaller districts in Burlington, Byron, Cowley, Deaver-Frannie.

== Geography ==
Big Horn County School District #1 serves the northwestern portion of Big Horn County as well as a very small portion of northeastern Park County, including the following communities:

- Incorporated places
  - Town of Burlington
  - Town of Byron
  - Town of Cowley
  - Town of Deaver
  - Town of Frannie
- Unincorporated places
  - Otto

== Schools ==
=== High schools ===
- Grades 9-12
  - Burlington High School
  - Rocky Mountain High School

=== Middle/Junior High Schools ===
- Grades 7-8
  - Burlington Junior High School
- Grades 6-8
  - Rocky Mountain Middle School

=== Elementary schools ===
- Grades PK-6
  - Burlington Elementary School
- Grades PK-5
  - Rocky Mountain Elementary School

== Student demographics ==
The following figures are as of October 1, 2009.

- Total District Enrollment: 610
- Student enrollment by gender
  - Male: 320 (52.46%)
  - Female: 290 (47.54%)
- Student enrollment by ethnicity
  - American Indian or Alaska Native: 7 (1.15%)
  - Asian: 1 (0.16%)
  - Black or African American: 3 (0.49%)
  - Hispanic or Latino: 77 (12.62%)
  - Native Hawaiian or Other Pacific Islander: 3 (0.49%)
  - Two or More Races: 8 (1.31%)
  - White: 511 (83.77%)

== See also ==
- List of school districts in Wyoming
