= Rocky Mountain Middle School =

There are at least three schools named Rocky Mountain Middle School in three US cities:

- Idaho Falls, Idaho
- Heber City, Utah
- Deaver, Wyoming
