= Cal Taggart =

American politician

Member of the Wyoming Senate
- In office 1973–1984

Personal details
- Born: January 6, 1924 Cowley, Wyoming, U.S.
- Died: April 21, 2004 (aged 80)
- Party: Republican
- Relations: Steven R. Cranfill (son-in-law)
- Education: Brigham Young University

Cal Taggart (January 6, 1924 – April 21, 2004) was an American politician. He served as a Republican member of the Wyoming Senate.

== Life and career ==
Taggart was born in Cowley, Wyoming. He attended Cowley High School and Brigham Young University.

Taggart served in the Wyoming Senate from 1973 to 1984.

Taggart died on April 21, 2004, at the age of 80.
