= List of municipalities in Wyoming =

Map of the United States with Wyoming highlighted

Wyoming is a state in the Western United States. According to the 2020 United States Census, Wyoming is the least populous state with 576,851 inhabitants but the 10th largest by land area with 97,093.14 square miles (251,470.1 km^{2}). Wyoming has 23 counties and 96 municipalities consisting of cities and towns. Wyoming's municipalities cover only 0.3% of the state's land mass but are home to 68.3% of its population.

Wyoming's most populous municipality is the capital city Cheyenne with 65,132 residents, and the largest municipality by land area is Casper, with an area of 26.9 mi^{2} (70 km^{2}), while the smallest municipality in both categories is Lost Springs with 6 residents and an area of 0.09 mi^{2} (0.23 km^{2}).

A Wyoming statute indicates towns are municipalities with populations of less than 4,000. Municipalities of 4,000 or more residents are considered "first-class cities".

== List of municipalities ==
Most populous municipalities in Wyoming by population

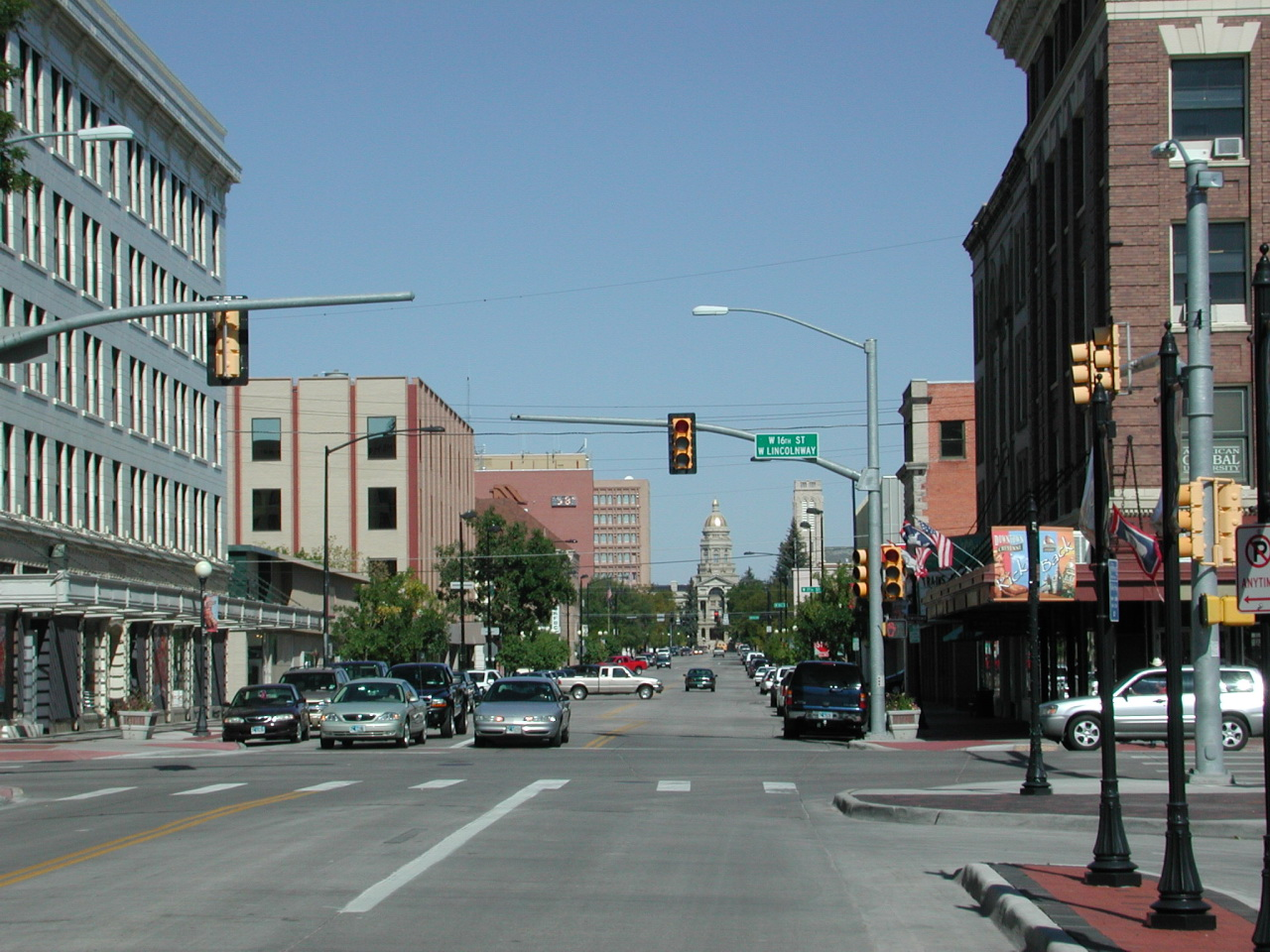
Downtown Cheyenne, capital and most populous city of Wyoming

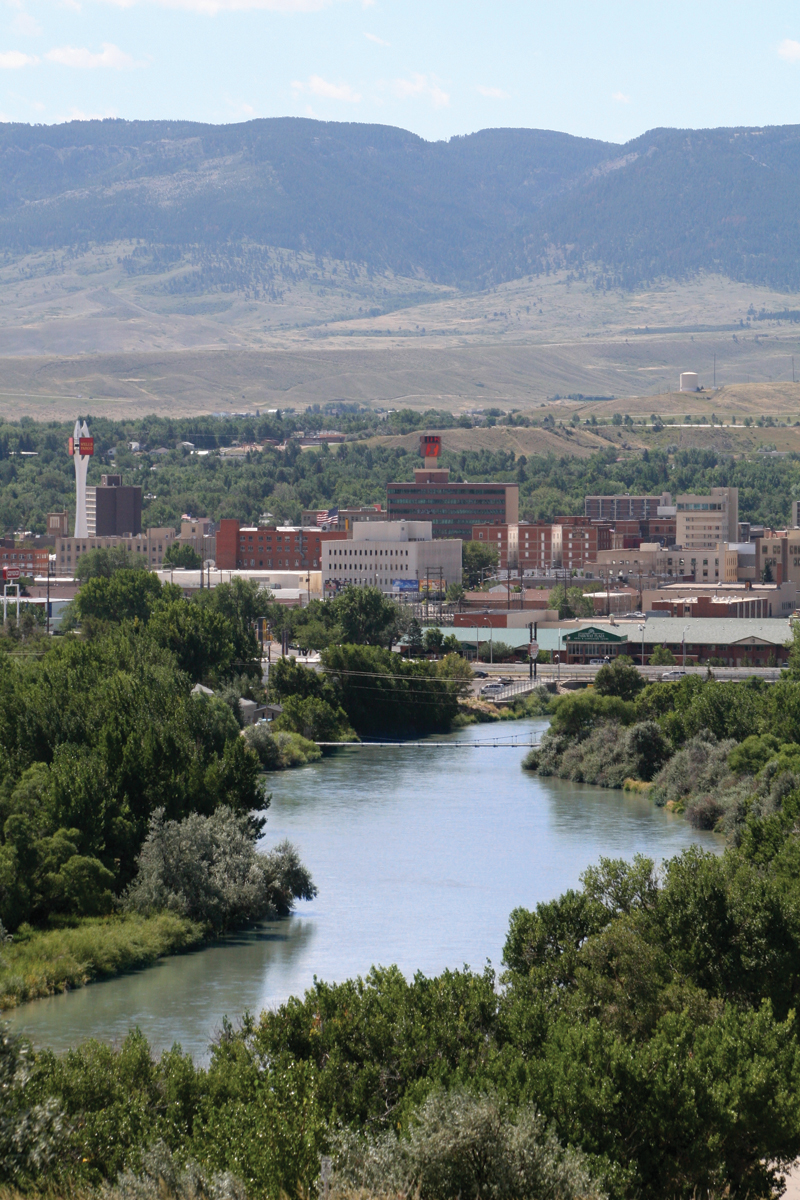
Casper, second most populous city in Wyoming

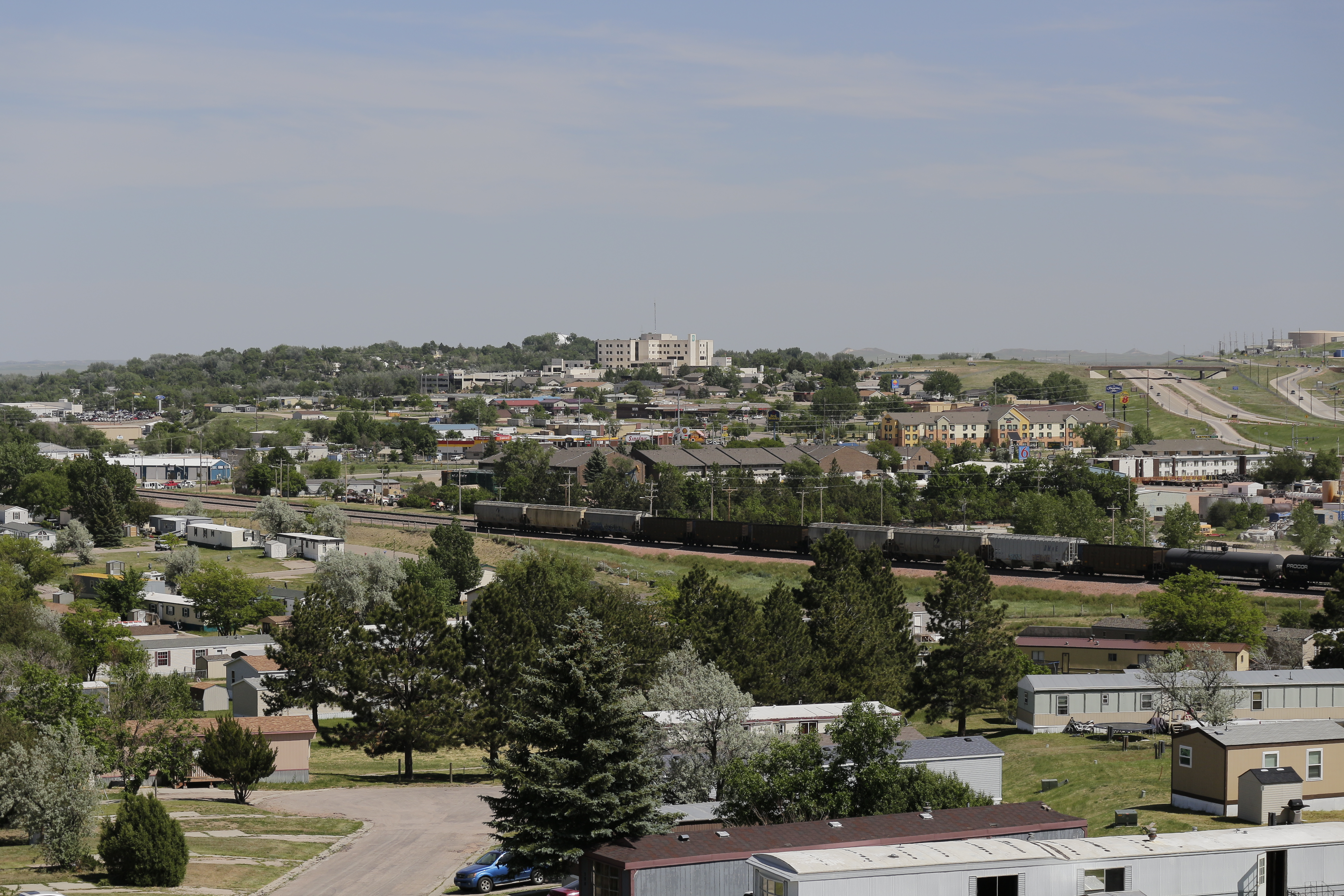
View of Gillette, third most populous city in Wyoming

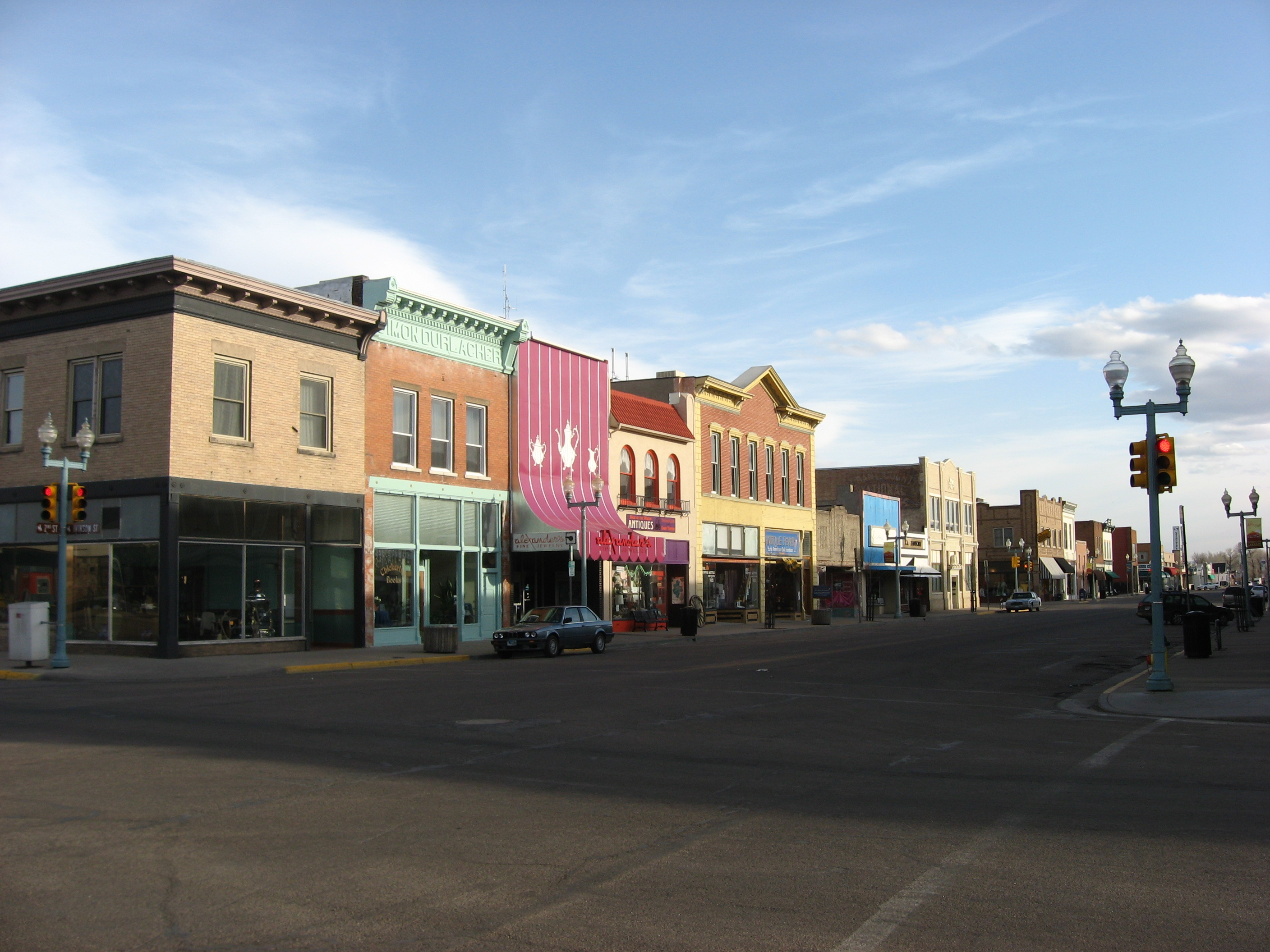
Downtown Laramie, fourth most populous city in Wyoming

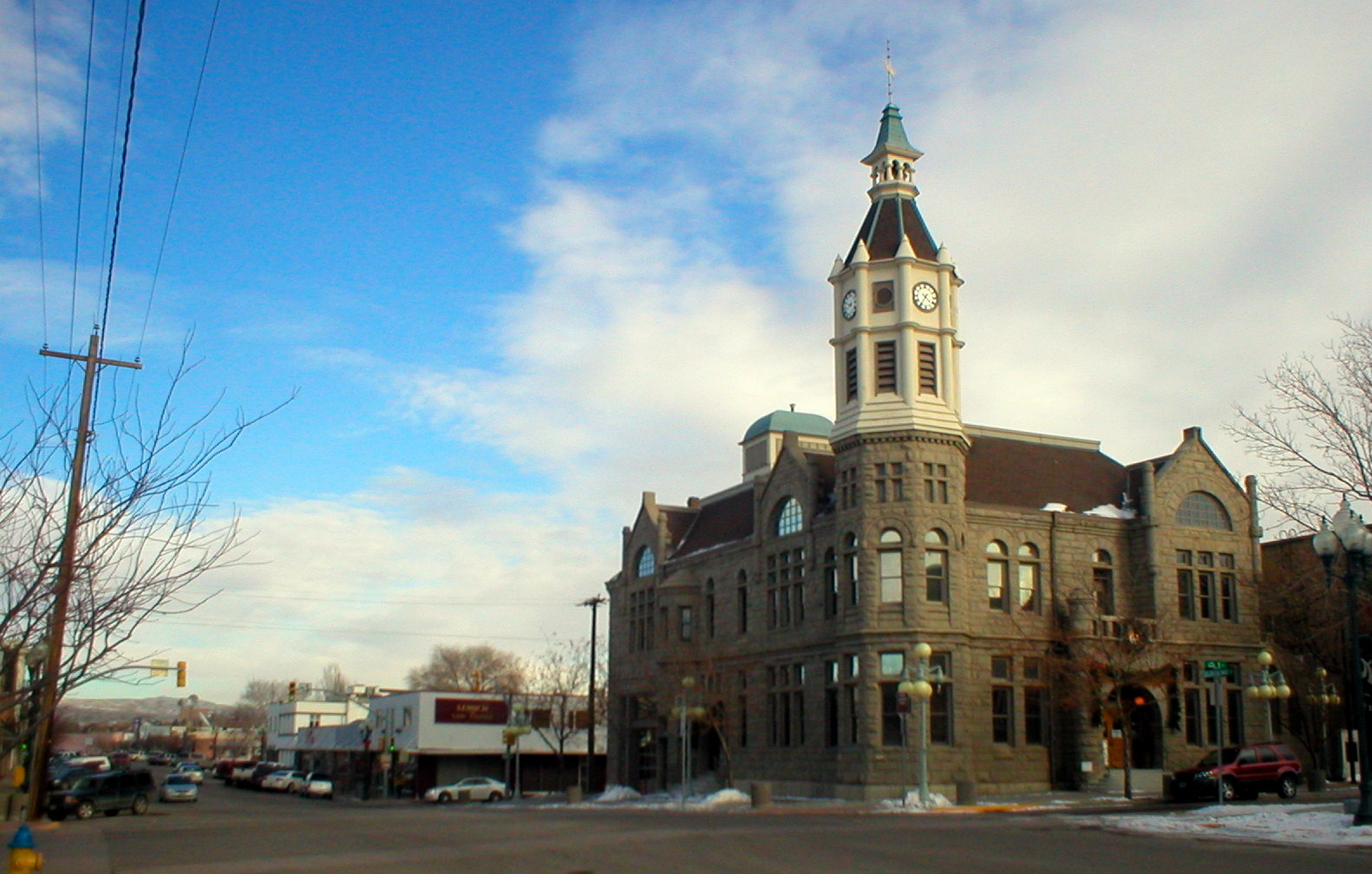
Downtown Rock Springs, fifth most populous city in Wyoming

State capital and county seat ‡

County seat†

Rank	Name	Type	County	Population (2020)	Population (2010)	Change (%)	Land area (2010)		Density
Rank	Name	Type	County	Population (2020)	Population (2010)	Change (%)	sq mi	km^{2}	Density
28	Afton	Town	Lincoln	2,172	1,911	+13.7%	4.18	10.8	519.6/sq mi (200.6/km^{2})
82	Albin	Town	Laramie	169	181	−6.6%	0.15	0.39	1,126.7/sq mi (435.0/km^{2})
38	Alpine	Town	Lincoln	1,220	828	+47.3%	0.70	1.8	1,742.9/sq mi (672.9/km^{2})
59	Baggs	Town	Carbon	411	440	−6.6%	0.51	1.3	805.9/sq mi (311.2/km^{2})
94	Bairoil	Town	Sweetwater	68	106	−35.8%	1.41	3.7	48.2/sq mi (18.6/km^{2})
22	Bar Nunn	Town	Natrona	2,981	2,213	+34.7%	2.10	5.4	1,419.5/sq mi (548.1/km^{2})
36	Basin†	Town	Big Horn	1,288	1,285	+0.2%	2.40	6.2	536.7/sq mi (207.2/km^{2})
51	Bear River	Town	Uinta	522	518	+0.8%	1.90	4.9	274.7/sq mi (106.1/km^{2})
61	Big Piney	Town	Sublette	395	552	−28.4%	0.45	1.2	877.8/sq mi (338.9/km^{2})
18	Buffalo†	City	Johnson	4,415	4,585	−3.7%	4.46	11.6	989.9/sq mi (382.2/km^{2})
67	Burlington	Town	Big Horn	314	288	+9.0%	1.01	2.6	310.9/sq mi (120.0/km^{2})
66	Burns	Town	Laramie	356	301	+18.3%	3.05	7.9	116.7/sq mi (45.1/km^{2})
50	Byron	Town	Big Horn	562	593	−5.2%	0.91	2.4	617.6/sq mi (238.4/km^{2})
2	Casper†	City	Natrona	59,038	55,316	+6.7%	26.90	69.7	2,194.7/sq mi (847.4/km^{2})
1	Cheyenne‡	City	Laramie	65,132	59,466	+9.5%	24.52	63.5	2,656.3/sq mi (1,025.6/km^{2})
81	Chugwater	Town	Platte	175	212	−17.5%	3.06	7.9	57.2/sq mi (22.1/km^{2})
88	Clearmont	Town	Sheridan	116	142	−18.3%	0.16	0.41	725.0/sq mi (279.9/km^{2})
11	Cody†	City	Park	10,028	9,520	+5.3%	10.20	26.4	983.1/sq mi (379.6/km^{2})
53	Cokeville	Town	Lincoln	502	535	−6.2%	1.18	3.1	425.4/sq mi (164.3/km^{2})
48	Cowley	Town	Big Horn	762	655	+16.3%	0.84	2.2	907.1/sq mi (350.2/km^{2})
46	Dayton	Town	Sheridan	822	757	+8.6%	0.53	1.4	1,550.9/sq mi (598.8/km^{2})
83	Deaver	Town	Big Horn	154	178	−13.5%	1.01	2.6	152.5/sq mi (58.9/km^{2})
52	Diamondville	Town	Lincoln	520	737	−29.4%	1.17	3.0	444.4/sq mi (171.6/km^{2})
93	Dixon	Town	Carbon	74	97	−23.7%	0.13	0.34	569.2/sq mi (219.8/km^{2})
15	Douglas†	City	Converse	6,386	6,120	+4.3%	4.58	11.9	1,394.3/sq mi (538.4/km^{2})
44	Dubois	Town	Fremont	911	971	−6.2%	3.42	8.9	266.4/sq mi (102.8/km^{2})
76	East Thermopolis	Town	Hot Springs	229	254	−9.8%	0.18	0.47	1,272.2/sq mi (491.2/km^{2})
84	Edgerton	Town	Natrona	153	195	−21.5%	0.25	0.65	612.0/sq mi (236.3/km^{2})
85	Elk Mountain	Town	Carbon	150	191	−21.5%	0.28	0.73	535.7/sq mi (206.8/km^{2})
56	Encampment	Town	Carbon	452	450	+0.4%	1.60	4.1	282.5/sq mi (109.1/km^{2})
8	Evanston†	City	Uinta	11,747	12,359	−5.0%	10.27	26.6	1,143.8/sq mi (441.6/km^{2})
23	Evansville	Town	Natrona	2,746	2,544	+7.9%	3.54	9.2	775.7/sq mi (299.5/km^{2})
78	Fort Laramie	Town	Goshen	206	230	−10.4%	0.27	0.70	763.0/sq mi (294.6/km^{2})
86	Frannie	Town	Big Horn, Park	145	157	−7.6%	0.44	1.1	329.5/sq mi (127.2/km^{2})
3	Gillette†	City	Campbell	33,403	29,087	+14.8%	18.97	49.1	1,760.8/sq mi (679.9/km^{2})
74	Glendo	Town	Platte	237	205	+15.6%	0.53	1.4	447.2/sq mi (172.7/km^{2})
26	Glenrock	Town	Converse	2,420	2,576	−6.1%	2.28	5.9	1,061.4/sq mi (409.8/km^{2})
89	Granger	Town	Sweetwater	98	139	−29.5%	2.53	6.6	38.7/sq mi (15.0/km^{2})
7	Green River†	City	Sweetwater	11,825	12,515	−5.5%	13.72	35.5	861.9/sq mi (332.8/km^{2})
33	Greybull	Town	Big Horn	1,651	1,847	−10.6%	1.81	4.7	912.2/sq mi (352.2/km^{2})
39	Guernsey	Town	Platte	1,130	1,147	−1.5%	1.02	2.6	1,107.8/sq mi (427.7/km^{2})
49	Hanna	Town	Carbon	683	841	−18.8%	2.04	5.3	334.8/sq mi (129.3/km^{2})
96	Hartville	Town	Platte	64	62	+3.2%	0.25	0.65	256.0/sq mi (98.8/km^{2})
57	Hudson	Town	Fremont	431	458	−5.9%	0.43	1.1	1,002.3/sq mi (387.0/km^{2})
68	Hulett	Town	Crook	309	383	−19.3%	0.87	2.3	355.2/sq mi (137.1/km^{2})
9	Jackson†	Town	Teton	10,760	9,577	+12.4%	2.91	7.5	3,697.6/sq mi (1,427.6/km^{2})
71	Kaycee	Town	Johnson	247	263	−6.1%	0.40	1.0	617.5/sq mi (238.4/km^{2})
27	Kemmerer†	City	Lincoln	2,415	2,656	−9.1%	7.80	20.2	309.6/sq mi (119.5/km^{2})
92	Kirby	Town	Hot Springs	76	92	−17.4%	0.15	0.39	506.7/sq mi (195.6/km^{2})
62	La Barge	Town	Lincoln	394	551	−28.5%	0.97	2.5	406.2/sq mi (156.8/km^{2})
65	La Grange	Town	Goshen	372	448	−17.0%	0.41	1.1	907.3/sq mi (350.3/km^{2})
13	Lander†	City	Fremont	7,546	7,487	+0.8%	4.66	12.1	1,619.3/sq mi (625.2/km^{2})
4	Laramie†	City	Albany	31,407	30,816	+1.9%	17.74	45.9	1,770.4/sq mi (683.6/km^{2})
60	Lingle	Town	Goshen	403	468	−13.9%	0.31	0.80	1,300.0/sq mi (501.9/km^{2})
99	Lost Springs	Town	Converse	6	4	+50.0%	0.09	0.23	66.7/sq mi (25.7/km^{2})
25	Lovell	Town	Big Horn	2,243	2,360	−5.0%	1.10	2.8	2,039.1/sq mi (787.3/km^{2})
35	Lusk†	Town	Niobrara	1,541	1,567	−1.7%	2.07	5.4	744.4/sq mi (287.4/km^{2})
29	Lyman	Town	Uinta	2,135	2,115	+0.9%	1.71	4.4	1,248.5/sq mi (482.1/km^{2})
91	Manderson	Town	Big Horn	88	114	−22.8%	0.85	2.2	103.5/sq mi (40.0/km^{2})
90	Manville	Town	Niobrara	92	95	−3.2%	0.27	0.70	340.7/sq mi (131.6/km^{2})
45	Marbleton	Town	Sublette	861	1,094	−21.3%	0.86	2.2	1,001.2/sq mi (386.6/km^{2})
73	Medicine Bow	Town	Carbon	245	284	−13.7%	3.46	9.0	70.8/sq mi (27.3/km^{2})
68	Meeteetse	Town	Park	309	327	−5.5%	0.87	2.3	355.2/sq mi (137.1/km^{2})
70	Midwest	Town	Natrona	285	404	−29.5%	0.43	1.1	662.8/sq mi (255.9/km^{2})
19	Mills	Town	Natrona	4,034	3,461	+16.6%	2.15	5.6	1,876.3/sq mi (724.4/km^{2})
43	Moorcroft	Town	Crook	946	1,009	−6.2%	1.26	3.3	750.8/sq mi (289.9/km^{2})
37	Mountain View	Town	Uinta	1,278	1,286	−0.6%	0.84	2.2	1,521.4/sq mi (587.4/km^{2})
21	Newcastle†	City	Weston	3,374	3,532	−4.5%	2.55	6.6	1,323.1/sq mi (510.9/km^{2})
96	Opal	Town	Lincoln	64	96	−33.3%	0.39	1.0	164.1/sq mi (63.4/km^{2})
75	Pavillion	Town	Fremont	230	231	−0.4%	0.21	0.54	1,095.2/sq mi (422.9/km^{2})
40	Pine Bluffs	Town	Laramie	1,172	1,129	+3.8%	3.22	8.3	364.0/sq mi (140.5/km^{2})
30	Pinedale†	Town	Sublette	2,005	2,030	−1.2%	2.15	5.6	932.6/sq mi (360.1/km^{2})
54	Pine Haven	Town	Crook	493	490	+0.6%	1.31	3.4	376.3/sq mi (145.3/km^{2})
14	Powell	City	Park	6,419	6,314	+1.7%	4.24	11.0	1,513.9/sq mi (584.5/km^{2})
41	Ranchester	Town	Sheridan	1,064	855	+24.4%	0.61	1.6	1,744.3/sq mi (673.5/km^{2})
12	Rawlins†	City	Carbon	8,221	9,259	−11.2%	8.24	21.3	997.7/sq mi (385.2/km^{2})
95	Riverside	Town	Carbon	66	52	+26.9%	0.27	0.70	244.4/sq mi (94.4/km^{2})
10	Riverton	City	Fremont	10,682	10,615	+0.6%	9.86	25.5	1,083.4/sq mi (418.3/km^{2})
77	Rock River	Town	Albany	211	245	−13.9%	2.33	6.0	90.6/sq mi (35.0/km^{2})
5	Rock Springs	City	Sweetwater	23,526	23,036	+2.1%	19.34	50.1	1,216.4/sq mi (469.7/km^{2})
58	Rolling Hills	Town	Converse	427	440	−3.0%	0.66	1.7	647.0/sq mi (249.8/km^{2})
32	Saratoga	Town	Carbon	1,702	1,690	+0.7%	3.40	8.8	500.6/sq mi (193.3/km^{2})
6	Sheridan†	City	Sheridan	18,737	17,444	+7.4%	10.93	28.3	1,714.3/sq mi (661.9/km^{2})
55	Shoshoni	Town	Fremont	471	649	−27.4%	3.58	9.3	131.6/sq mi (50.8/km^{2})
64	Sinclair	Town	Carbon	374	433	−13.6%	2.43	6.3	153.9/sq mi (59.4/km^{2})
31	Star Valley Ranch	Town	Lincoln	1,866	1,503	+24.2%	2.70	7.0	691.1/sq mi (266.8/km^{2})
42	Sundance†	Town	Crook	1,032	1,182	−12.7%	3.05	7.9	338.4/sq mi (130.6/km^{2})
80	Superior	Town	Sweetwater	184	336	−45.2%	1.09	2.8	168.8/sq mi (65.2/km^{2})
72	Ten Sleep	Town	Washakie	246	260	−5.4%	0.18	0.47	1,366.7/sq mi (527.7/km^{2})
63	Thayne	Town	Lincoln	380	366	+3.8%	1.39	3.6	273.4/sq mi (105.6/km^{2})
24	Thermopolis†	Town	Hot Springs	2,725	3,009	−9.4%	2.38	6.2	1,145.0/sq mi (442.1/km^{2})
16	Torrington†	City	Goshen	6,119	6,501	−5.9%	4.62	12.0	1,324.5/sq mi (511.4/km^{2})
47	Upton	Town	Weston	898	1,100	−18.4%	2.96	7.7	303.4/sq mi (117.1/km^{2})
98	Van Tassell	Town	Niobrara	22	15	+46.7%	1.83	4.7	12.0/sq mi (4.6/km^{2})
79	Wamsutter	Town	Sweetwater	203	451	−55.0%	1.45	3.8	140.0/sq mi (54.1/km^{2})
20	Wheatland†	Town	Platte	3,588	3,627	−1.1%	4.10	10.6	875.1/sq mi (337.9/km^{2})
17	Worland†	City	Washakie	4,773	5,487	−13.0%	4.56	11.8	1,046.7/sq mi (404.1/km^{2})
34	Wright	Town	Campbell	1,644	1,807	−9.0%	2.85	7.4	576.8/sq mi (222.7/km^{2})
87	Yoder	Town	Goshen	131	151	−13.2%	0.21	0.54	623.8/sq mi (240.9/km^{2})
99	Total	—	—	398,304	384,960	+3.5%	322.61	835.6	1,234.6/sq mi (476.7/km^{2})

== See also ==
- List of census-designated places in Wyoming
