= Rocky Mountain High School (Wyoming) =

Coordinates: 44°52′34″N 108°27′52″W

Location
- 404 South 3rd East; Cowley, Wyoming 82420; United States

Information
- Type: Public high school
- Established: 1983
- School district: Big Horn County School District #1
- Principal: Tim Winland
- Grades: 6–12
- Enrollment: 404 (2023-2024)
- Campus: Rural
- Colors: Brown and gold
- Mascot: Grizzly bear
- Website: Rocky Mountain High School
- Former School Building in Byron

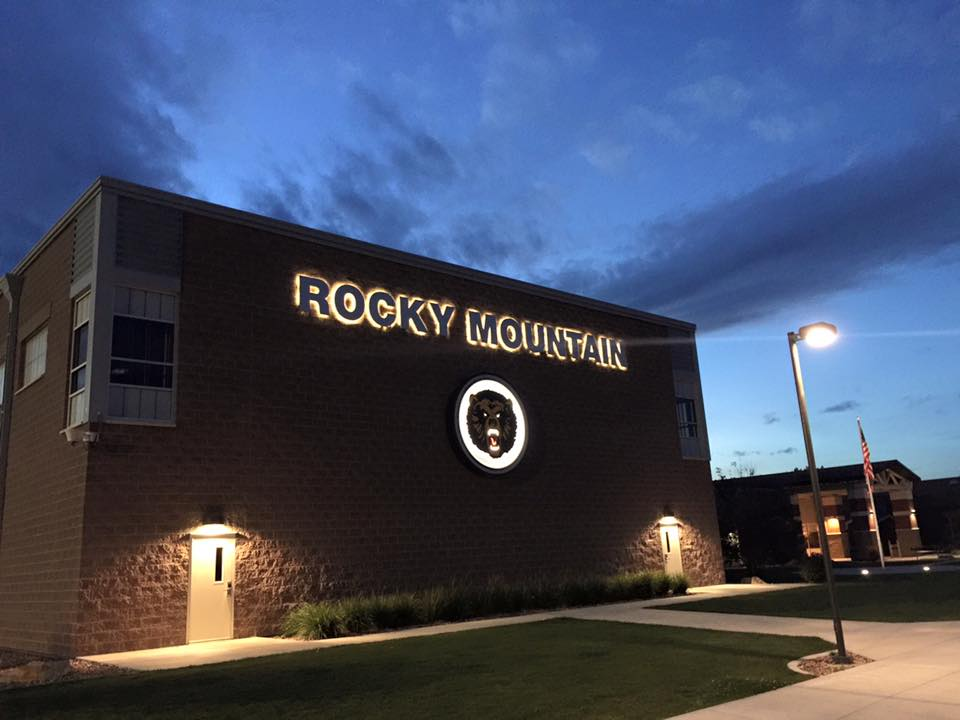
Rocky Mountain High School

Rocky Mountain High School (RMHS) is a public high school in Cowley, Wyoming, United States. It covers grades 6 through 12, and is part of Big Horn County School District 1. RMHS serves the cities of Byron, Cowley, Deaver, and Frannie. The school mascot is the Grizzly Bear. In 2010 the Middle School and High School were combined into a 6-12 school in a new building in Cowley.

== History ==
In the fall of 2010 students moved into a new high school-middle school facility on the southeast side of Cowley. The school features state-of-the-art technology, a large commons area and two gymnasiums.

The school building that used to house RMHS was completed in 1956 to house the Byron High School. At that time only students from Byron attended the school. A typical graduating class from BHS had about 20 to 25 students. In 1983 it was decided to consolidate the three high schools in the north end of Big Horn County into one school. These were Byron High School, Cowley High School, and Deaver-Frannie High School.

== Academics ==
Rocky Mountain High School offers a rigorous academic schedule. It also has several vocational programs, elective classes and extracurricular activities. There is a music department with both a concert choir and concert band. The art department includes art classes and an art club. Vocational classes include woodworking, welding, foods, home economics, multimedia and small engine repair. There is also an active Student Council along with chapters of, FBLA, and FFA.

== Athletics ==
RMHS offers sporting opportunities in football, volleyball, cross-country, basketball, wrestling, track, and cheerleading.

RMHS has won Wyoming state championships in cheerleading, dance, boys and girls basketball, girls cross-country, football, boys track and volleyball.

== See also ==
- Big Horn County, Wyoming
- Byron
- Cowley
