= Kirwin, Wyoming =

Kirwin
- Ghost town
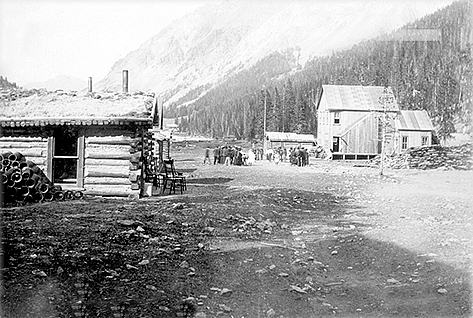
- Kirwin, 1905

- Location within the state of Wyoming Kirwin (the United States)
- Coordinates: 43°52′32″N 109°17′44″W
- Country: United States
- State: Wyoming
- County: Park
- Elevation: 9,193 ft (2,802 m)
- Time zone: UTC-7 (Mountain (MST))
  - Summer (DST): UTC-6 (MDT)
- GNIS feature ID: 1600733

Kirwin is a ghost town in Park County, Wyoming, United States. Its post office has been closed.

The former mining town is a historic site. Amelia Earhart was having a cabin built there before her disappearance.

== History ==
Kirwin is located at the headwaters of Wood River and is surrounded by several 12,000-foot peaks.

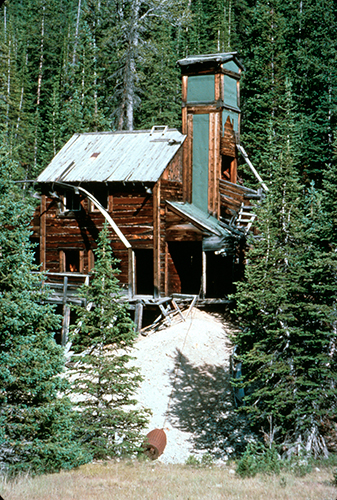
Wolf Mine in Kirwin

The area's first prospectors, a group of 130 men, arrived in 1870 led by William Kuykendall. The prospectors were made to leave by soldiers from Fort Bowman or possibly Camp Brown due to the area being a part of a treaty with the Shoshone tribe. One of the prospectors, John Henry, was killed after splitting off from the group to hunt buffalo.

Its origins as a town trace back to 1885 when Harry Adams, and the town's namesake, William Kirwin found gold and silver while hunting deer in the area.

The town quickly attracted attention after Adams shared news of the find, sparking a rush of prospectors. In 1891, the Wood River Mining District was formed leading to several claims being made in the surrounding area.

At its peak between 1904 and 1906, the town was home to about 200 people -- all miners and their families. "The town was home to a hotel, a boarding house, two general stores, a sawmill, an assay shop, a headquarters building, a post office, and a number of cabins, stables, and meat storage sheds." Many of these buildings are still standing.

On February 5, 1907, the precarious positioning of Kirwin came to a head when a massive avalanche from Bald Mountain struck the town, destroying several buildings and killing three people, causing a large portion of the town to leave the area, with the rest vacating the area in the following years.

There were several attempts at reviving the area, through both the Double D Dude Ranch, as well as various attempts at establishing mining operations in the 1940s and '60s, all of which eventually fell through.

In 1992 the land, including Kirwin and the Double D ranch, was purchased by a conservation fund that donated it to the public, at which point, in 1999 restoration and stabilization of the historic buildings and area began.

== Climate ==
Kirwin has a subarctic climate (Köppen Dfc).

Climate data for Kirwin, Wyoming, 1991–2020 normals: 9550ft (2911m)
Month	Jan	Feb	Mar	Apr	May	Jun	Jul	Aug	Sep	Oct	Nov	Dec	Year
Mean daily maximum °F (°C)	26.0 (−3.3)	27.6 (−2.4)	36.6 (2.6)	43.0 (6.1)	50.7 (10.4)	59.7 (15.4)	68.4 (20.2)	66.7 (19.3)	56.9 (13.8)	42.5 (5.8)	30.8 (−0.7)	25.0 (−3.9)	44.5 (6.9)
Daily mean °F (°C)	17.7 (−7.9)	17.9 (−7.8)	24.9 (−3.9)	30.6 (−0.8)	39.2 (4.0)	47.3 (8.5)	54.6 (12.6)	53.4 (11.9)	45.3 (7.4)	33.3 (0.7)	22.7 (−5.2)	17.0 (−8.3)	33.7 (0.9)
Mean daily minimum °F (°C)	9.3 (−12.6)	7.9 (−13.4)	12.9 (−10.6)	18.1 (−7.7)	27.6 (−2.4)	34.8 (1.6)	40.8 (4.9)	40.0 (4.4)	33.8 (1.0)	23.9 (−4.5)	14.6 (−9.7)	8.9 (−12.8)	22.7 (−5.1)
Average precipitation inches (mm)	1.63 (41)	1.88 (48)	2.41 (61)	2.97 (75)	3.62 (92)	2.45 (62)	1.81 (46)	1.69 (43)	2.17 (55)	2.22 (56)	1.93 (49)	2.01 (51)	26.79 (679)
Source 1: XMACIS2
Source 2: NOAA (Precipitation)

Mount Crosby (Wyoming) is a mountain that rises to the north of Kirwin. There is no weather station at the summit, but this climate table contains interpolated data for an area around the summit. Mount Crosby has an Alpine climate (ET).

Climate data for Mount Crosby 43.8749 N, 109.3331 W, Elevation: 11,991 ft (3,655 m) (1991–2020 normals)
Month	Jan	Feb	Mar	Apr	May	Jun	Jul	Aug	Sep	Oct	Nov	Dec	Year
Mean daily maximum °F (°C)	18.8 (−7.3)	18.7 (−7.4)	24.8 (−4.0)	31.0 (−0.6)	39.7 (4.3)	49.9 (9.9)	59.5 (15.3)	58.4 (14.7)	49.2 (9.6)	36.0 (2.2)	24.4 (−4.2)	17.9 (−7.8)	35.7 (2.1)
Daily mean °F (°C)	10.2 (−12.1)	9.2 (−12.7)	14.3 (−9.8)	19.4 (−7.0)	28.0 (−2.2)	37.4 (3.0)	46.0 (7.8)	45.2 (7.3)	37.1 (2.8)	25.7 (−3.5)	15.8 (−9.0)	9.6 (−12.4)	24.8 (−4.0)
Mean daily minimum °F (°C)	1.7 (−16.8)	−0.3 (−17.9)	3.7 (−15.7)	7.9 (−13.4)	16.4 (−8.7)	24.8 (−4.0)	32.6 (0.3)	32.0 (0.0)	24.9 (−3.9)	15.4 (−9.2)	7.2 (−13.8)	1.3 (−17.1)	14.0 (−10.0)
Average precipitation inches (mm)	1.80 (46)	2.03 (52)	2.49 (63)	3.13 (80)	3.84 (98)	2.52 (64)	2.01 (51)	1.89 (48)	2.33 (59)	2.28 (58)	2.07 (53)	2.21 (56)	28.6 (728)
Source: PRISM Climate Group
