= 1992 United States presidential election in Wyoming =

- November 3, 1992
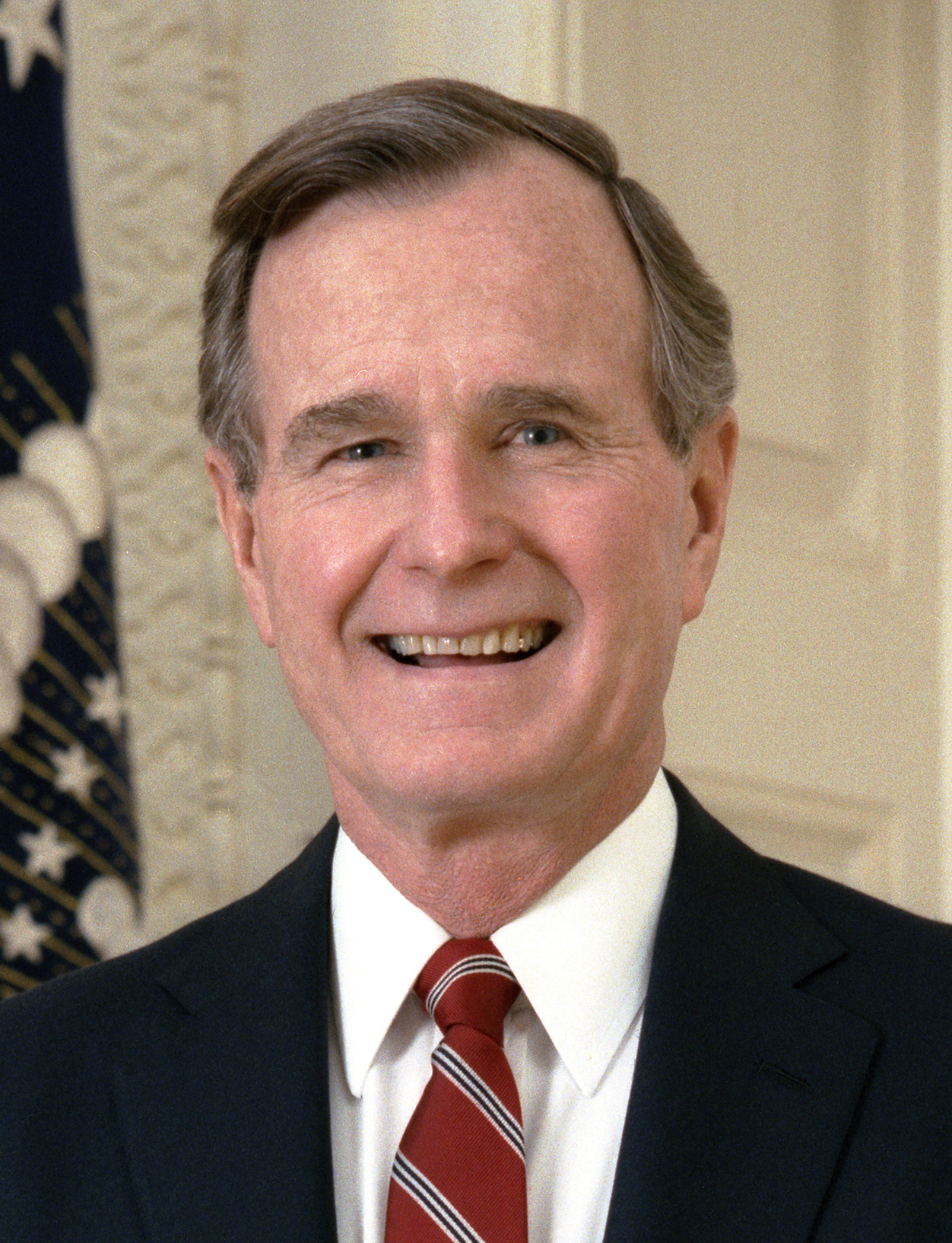

Nominee	George H. W. Bush	Bill Clinton	Ross Perot
Party	Republican	Democratic	Independent
Home state	Texas	Arkansas	Texas
Running mate	Dan Quayle	Al Gore	James Stockdale
Electoral vote	3	0	0
Popular vote	79,347	68,160	51,263
Percentage	39.70%	34.10%	25.65%

Bush
30–40%
40–50%
50–60%
60–70%
70–80%
80–90%
Clinton
30–40%
40–50%
50–60%
60–70%
Perot
30–40%
40–50%
No data/Tie
No data
Tie
President before election
George H. W. Bush
Republican
Elected President
Bill Clinton
Democratic

The 1992 United States presidential election in Wyoming took place on November 3, 1992, as part of the 1992 United States presidential election. Voters chose three representatives, or electors to the Electoral College, who voted for president and vice president.

Wyoming was won by incumbent President George H. W. Bush (R-Texas) with 39.70 percent of the popular vote over Governor Bill Clinton (D-Arkansas) with 34.10 percent. Businessman Ross Perot (I-Texas) finished in third, with 25.65 percent of the popular vote. Clinton ultimately won the national vote, defeating incumbent President Bush. This election was the closest result in the state since 1948, when it narrowly voted for Harry S. Truman over Thomas E. Dewey. In fact, as of 2024 this is the last time in which the state was decided by single digits and the last time the state ended up being somewhat competitive. As of the 2024 presidential election, this is the last election in which Natrona County and Carbon County voted for the Democratic candidate. It was also the first time any Wyoming county had voted for a Democrat since Jimmy Carter won Sweetwater County in 1976, and the first time Teton County voted for a Democratic presidential candidate since it voted for Franklin D. Roosevelt over Wendell Willkie in 1940.

== General election ==
=== Predictions ===
Source	Rating	As of
The Cook Political Report	Lean R	October 28, 1992

=== Results ===
1992 United States presidential election in Wyoming
Party	Candidate	Votes	Percentage	Electoral votes
Republican	George H. W. Bush (incumbent)	79,347	39.70%	3
Democratic	Bill Clinton	68,160	34.10%	0
Independent	Ross Perot	51,263	25.65%	0
Libertarian	Andre Marrou	844	0.42%	0
Independent	Lenora Fulani	270	0.14%	0
Totals		199,884	100.00%	3

=== Results by county ===
County	George H. W. Bush Republican		Bill Clinton Democratic		Ross Perot Independent		Other candidates Various parties		Margin		Total votes cast
County	#	%	#	%	#	%	#	%	#	%	Total votes cast
Albany	4,176	32.46%	5,713	44.40%	2,862	22.24%	116	0.90%	-1,537	-11.94%	12,867
Big Horn	2,216	46.54%	1,216	25.54%	1,236	25.96%	94	1.97%	980 (Note: In this county where Clinton ran third behind Bush and Perot, margin given is Bush vote minus Perot vote and percentage margin Bush percentage minus Perot percentage.)	20.58%	4,762
Campbell	5,315	47.42%	2,709	24.17%	3,133	27.95%	51	0.46%	2,182	19.47%	11,208
Carbon	2,320	34.74%	2,737	40.99%	1,579	23.64%	42	0.63%	-417	-6.25%	6,678
Converse	2,159	45.44%	1,307	27.51%	1,260	26.52%	25	0.53%	852	17.93%	4,751
Crook	1,377	51.32%	568	21.17%	718	26.76%	20	0.75%	659	24.56%	2,683
Fremont	5,387	38.77%	4,765	34.29%	3,594	25.86%	150	1.08%	622	4.48%	13,896
Goshen	2,395	45.04%	1,754	32.98%	1,144	21.51%	25	0.47%	641	12.06%	5,318
Hot Springs	978	40.77%	740	30.85%	652	27.18%	29	1.21%	238	9.92%	2,399
Johnson	1,614	51.30%	656	20.85%	844	26.83%	32	1.02%	770	24.47%	3,146
Laramie	12,890	40.46%	12,177	38.23%	6,607	20.74%	181	0.57%	713	2.23%	31,855
Lincoln	2,595	45.08%	1,430	24.84%	1,495	25.97%	237	4.12%	1,100	19.11%	5,757
Natrona	9,717	35.46%	9,817	35.83%	7,647	27.91%	219	0.80%	-100	-0.37%	27,400
Niobrara	635	48.85%	298	22.92%	355	27.31%	12	0.92%	280	21.54%	1,300
Park	5,218	46.55%	2,771	24.72%	3,145	28.06%	75	0.67%	2,073	18.49%	11,209
Platte	1,668	41.18%	1,398	34.51%	956	23.60%	29	0.72%	270	6.67%	4,051
Sheridan	4,303	37.21%	4,139	35.79%	3,035	26.24%	88	0.76%	164	1.42%	11,565
Sublette	1,168	45.38%	536	20.82%	828	32.17%	42	1.63%	340	13.21%	2,574
Sweetwater	4,476	30.02%	6,417	43.04%	3,879	26.02%	138	0.93%	-1,941	-13.02%	14,910
Teton	2,854	34.05%	3,120	37.22%	2,340	27.92%	68	0.81%	-266	-3.17%	8,382
Uinta	2,701	39.12%	2,047	29.65%	2,041	29.56%	116	1.68%	654	9.47%	6,905
Washakie	1,720	43.19%	1,118	28.08%	1,084	27.22%	60	1.51%	602	15.11%	3,982
Weston	1,465	48.40%	727	24.02%	829	27.39%	6	0.20%	636	21.01%	3,027
Totals	79,347	39.55%	68,160	33.97%	51,263	25.55%	1,855	0.92%	11,187	5.58%	200,625

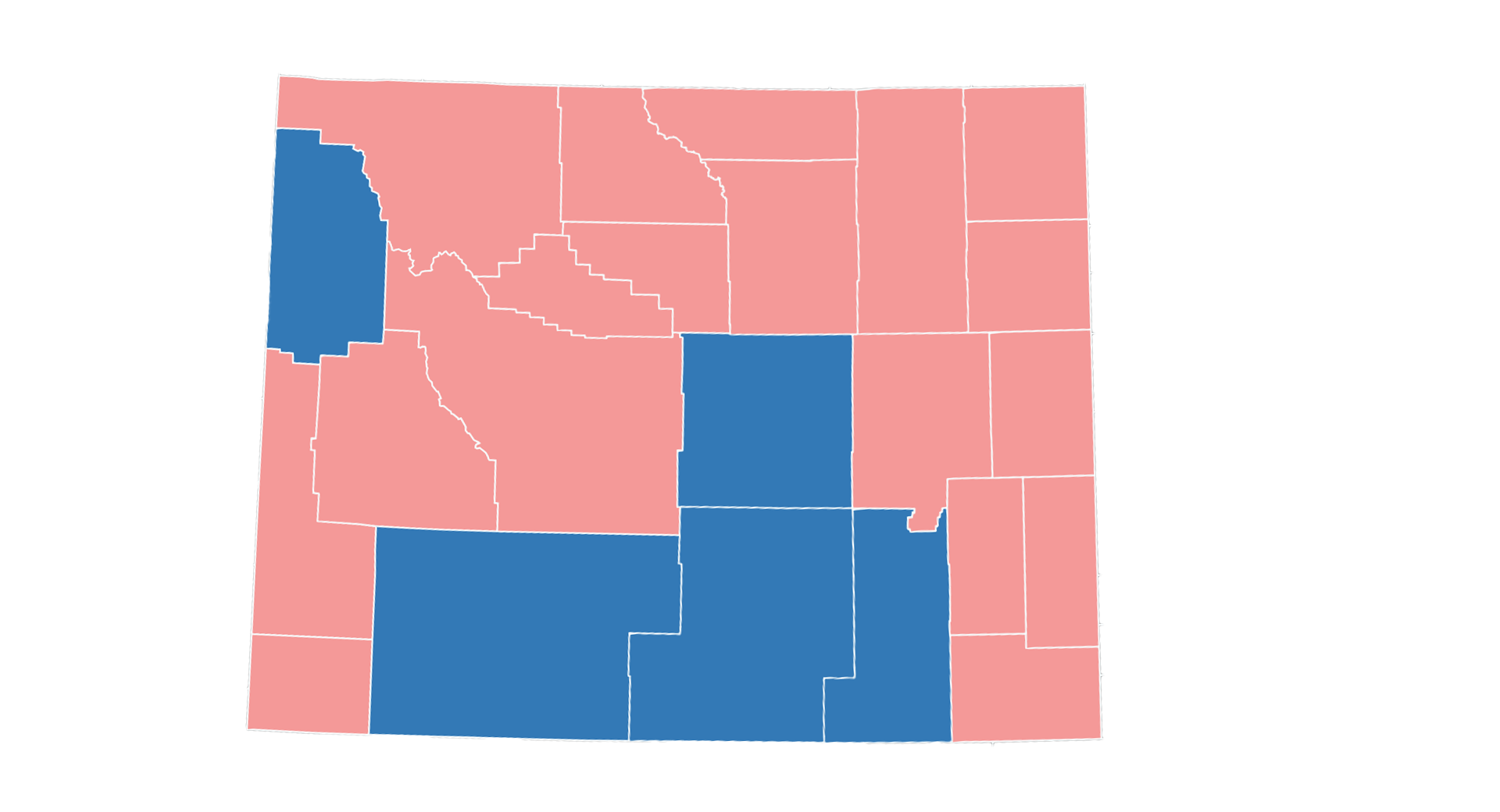
County flips from 1988: Democratic Hold Gain from Republican / Republican Hold

==== Counties that flipped from Republican to Democratic ====
- Albany
- Carbon
- Natrona
- Sweetwater
- Teton

== See also ==
- United States presidential elections in Wyoming
- Presidency of Bill Clinton
