= Byron, Wyoming =

Town in Big Horn County, Wyoming, United States

- Town
- Flag
- Motto: A Great Place to Live!
- Location of Byron in Big Horn County, Wyoming
- Coordinates: 44°47′48″N 108°30′18″W
- Country: United States
- State: Wyoming
- County: Big Horn
- Settled: 1898
- Incorporated: 1912

Area
  - Total: 0.95 sq mi (2.47 km^{2})
  - Land: 0.91 sq mi (2.35 km^{2})
  - Water: 0.046 sq mi (0.12 km^{2})
- Elevation: 4,029 ft (1,228 m)

Population (2020)
  - Total: 562
  - Density: 620/sq mi (239.5/km^{2})
- Time zone: UTC-7 (Mountain (MST))
  - Summer (DST): UTC-6 (MDT)
- ZIP code: 82412
- Area code: 307
- FIPS code: 56-11700
- GNIS feature ID: 2413146
- Website: byronwyoming.org

Byron is a town in Big Horn County, Wyoming, United States. The population was 562 according to the 2020 census.

== History ==
The first settlement at Byron was made around 1898. The community has the name of Byron Sessions, a Mormon leader. It was incorporated in 1912.

On February 10, 2025, the community faced tragedy when a mother, Tranyelle Harshman, shot and killed her four children then herself.

== Geography ==
According to the United States Census Bureau, the town has a total area of 0.96 square miles (2.49 km^{2}), of which 0.91 square miles (2.36 km^{2}) is land and 0.05 square miles (0.13 km^{2}) is water.

== Demographics ==
Historical population
| Census | Pop. | Note | %± |
|---|---|---|---|
| 1910 | 442 | | — |
| 1920 | 326 | | −26.2% |
| 1930 | 250 | | −23.3% |
| 1940 | 388 | | 55.2% |
| 1950 | 350 | | −9.8% |
| 1960 | 417 | | 19.1% |
| 1970 | 397 | | −4.8% |
| 1980 | 633 | | 59.4% |
| 1990 | 470 | | −25.8% |
| 2000 | 557 | | 18.5% |
| 2010 | 593 | | 6.5% |
| 2020 | 562 | | −5.2% |
U.S. Decennial Census

=== 2010 census ===
As of the census of 2010, there were 593 people, 210 households, and 161 families living in the town. The population density was 651.6 inhabitants per square mile (251.6/km^{2}). There were 238 housing units at an average density of 261.5 per square mile (101.0/km^{2}). The racial makeup of the town was 97.1% White, 0.2% Native American, 1.9% from other races, and 0.8% from two or more races. Hispanic or Latino of any race were 12.5% of the population.

There were 210 households, of which 38.6% had children under the age of 18 living with them, 60.0% were married couples living together, 12.4% had a female householder with no husband present, 4.3% had a male householder with no wife present, and 23.3% were non-families. 19.0% of all households were made up of individuals, and 7.1% had someone living alone who was 65 years of age or older. The average household size was 2.82 and the average family size was 3.25.

The median age in the town was 35.9 years. 30.9% of residents were under the age of 18; 7.2% were between the ages of 18 and 24; 24% were from 25 to 44; 24.3% were from 45 to 64; and 13.7% were 65 years of age or older. The gender makeup of the town was 50.8% male and 49.2% female.

=== 2000 census ===
As of the census of 2000, there were 557 people, 195 households, and 148 families living in the town. The population density was 662.8 people per square mile (256.0/km^{2}). There were 217 housing units at an average density of 258.2 per square mile (99.7/km^{2}). The racial makeup of the town was 90.84% White, 0.36% Native American, 7.18% from other races, and 1.62% from two or more races. Hispanic or Latino of any race were 14.00% of the population.

There were 195 households, out of which 37.4% had children under the age of 18 living with them, 57.4% were married couples living together, 14.9% had a female householder with no husband present, and 23.6% were non-families. 20.0% of all households were made up of individuals, and 9.7% had someone living alone who was 65 years of age or older. The average household size was 2.86 and the average family size was 3.34.

In the town, the population was spread out, with 32.9% under the age of 18, 7.4% from 18 to 24, 21.2% from 25 to 44, 24.8% from 45 to 64, and 13.8% who were 65 years of age or older. The median age was 34 years. For every 100 females, there were 106.3 males. For every 100 females age 18 and over, there were 93.8 males.

The median income for a household in the town was $34,375, and the median income for a family was $37,045. Males had a median income of $33,409 versus $16,667 for females. The per capita income for the town was $11,931. About 19.9% of families and 22.6% of the population were below the poverty line, including 34.6% of those under age 18 and 9.1% of those age 65 or over.

== Arts and culture ==
The town celebrates Byron Days the second weekend in July.

The Byron Museum focuses on local history and the settlement of Byron by Mormon pioneers.

== Government ==
Byron has a mayor and town council. There are four council members. In 2026 the mayor was Allan Clark.

== Education ==
Before the educational system of Byron was moved to Cowley, public education in the town of Byron was provided by Big Horn County School District #1. High school students now attend Rocky Mountain High School in Cowley, Wyoming. Middle School students attend Rocky Mountain Middle School in Cowley and Elementary students attend Rocky Mountain Elementary School in Cowley.

== See also ==
- List of municipalities in Wyoming
