= Steven R. Cranfill =

American politician

Member of the Wyoming House of Representatives
- In office 1975–1978

Personal details
- Born: June 11, 1950 (age 76) Greybull, Wyoming, U.S.
- Party: Democratic
- Relations: Cal Taggart (father-in-law)
- Education: Weber State University; University of Pacific

Steven R. Cranfill (born June 11, 1950) is an American politician. He served as a Democratic member of the Wyoming House of Representatives.

== Life and career ==
Cranfill was born in Greybull, Wyoming. He attended Weber State University and the University of Pacific. Cranfill worked as a social worker, in road surfacing, as a teaching assistant and as a life insurance agent.

Cranfill served in Wyoming House of Representatives from 1975 to 1978. He served on the House Corporations, Elections & Political Subdivisions and House Travel, Recreation & Wildlife committees. He then tried for a seat in the senate after being frustrated that legislation passed from the house often failed to pass the senate. He ran against the incumbent republican Gerald Geis for the Washakie County seat but lost.

He married Dana Taggart, daughter of senator Cal Taggart, in the Wyoming State Capitol building.
