= 1988 United States presidential election in Wyoming =

- November 8, 1988

Nominee	George H. W. Bush	Michael Dukakis
Party	Republican	Democratic
Home state	Texas	Massachusetts
Running mate	Dan Quayle	Lloyd Bentsen
Electoral vote	3	0
Popular vote	106,867	67,113
Percentage	60.53%	38.01%
County results
Bush
40–50%
50–60%
60–70%
70–80%
President before election
Ronald Reagan
Republican
Elected President
George H. W. Bush
Republican

The 1988 United States presidential election in Wyoming took place on November 8, 1988. All 50 states and the District of Columbia, were part of the 1988 United States presidential election. State voters chose three electors to the Electoral College, which selected the president and vice president.

Wyoming was won by incumbent United States Vice President George H. W. Bush of Texas, who was running against Massachusetts Governor Michael Dukakis. Bush ran with Indiana Senator Dan Quayle as vice president, and Dukakis ran with Texas Senator Lloyd Bentsen.

Wyoming weighed in for this election as 14.3 percentage points more Republican than the national average. The presidential election of 1988 was a fairly partisan election for Wyoming, with nearly 98 percent of the electorate voting for either the Democratic or Republican parties, and only four candidates on the ballot.

Bush won the election in Wyoming with a solid 22-point landslide, sweeping all 23 of the state's counties. Dukakis' best county, and Bush's worst, was Sweetwater County, which Bush won by 60 votes, or less than half of 1%. Sweetwater County is one of Wyoming's "Union Pacific counties" that traditionally formed the Democratic Party's base in the state. Bush broke 70% in six counties, of which four were in the state's east and one, Park County, in the Bighorn basin, traditional areas of Republican strength in the state; Sublette County rounded out this group. Overall, however, Bush's 22.52% margin in the state made it 14.80% more Republican than the nation overall. The Mountain West had trended Republican beginning in the 1952 election; after voting for Truman in the nationally close 1948 election, Wyoming had consistently voted to the right of the country in every subsequent election. In 1988, it did so once again, even as some other Mountain states' traditional Republicanism wavered, as in Colorado and Montana. Bush's vote share of 60.53% made Wyoming his third-best state in the region (after Utah and Idaho), and his sixth-best overall (after Utah, New Hampshire, Idaho, South Carolina, and Florida). Along with New Hampshire, Nevada, Delaware, and Maine, it was also one of five states where every county voted for Bush.

== Results ==
1988 United States presidential election in Wyoming
Party	Candidate	Votes	Percentage	Electoral votes
Republican	George H. W. Bush	106,867	60.53%	3
Democratic	Michael Dukakis	67,113	38.01%	0
Libertarian	Ron Paul	2,026	1.15%	0
New Alliance Party	Lenora Fulani	545	0.31%	0
Totals		176,551	100.00%	3

=== Results by county ===
County	George H. W. Bush Republican		Michael Dukakis Democratic		Other candidates Various parties		Margin		Total votes cast
County	#	%	#	%	#	%	#	%	Total votes cast
Albany	5,653	49.87%	5,486	48.40%	196	1.73%	167	1.47%	11,335
Big Horn	3,258	68.16%	1,469	30.73%	53	1.11%	1,789	37.43%	4,780
Campbell	6,702	73.55%	2,288	25.11%	122	1.34%	4,414	48.44%	9,112
Carbon	3,336	55.70%	2,555	42.66%	98	1.64%	781	13.04%	5,989
Converse	2,885	68.45%	1,301	30.87%	29	0.69%	1,584	37.58%	4,215
Crook	1,939	76.34%	553	21.77%	48	1.89%	1,386	54.57%	2,540
Fremont	7,681	59.59%	5,020	38.95%	188	1.46%	2,661	20.64%	12,889
Goshen	3,075	61.44%	1,875	37.46%	55	1.10%	1,200	23.98%	5,005
Hot Springs	1,490	64.11%	800	34.42%	34	1.46%	690	29.69%	2,324
Johnson	2,081	72.81%	707	24.74%	70	2.45%	1,374	48.07%	2,858
Laramie	15,561	56.04%	11,851	42.68%	358	1.29%	3,710	13.36%	27,770
Lincoln	3,237	66.10%	1,592	32.51%	68	1.39%	1,645	33.59%	4,897
Natrona	14,005	59.63%	9,148	38.95%	334	1.42%	4,857	20.68%	23,487
Niobrara	825	69.27%	354	29.72%	12	1.01%	471	39.55%	1,191
Park	6,884	70.95%	2,646	27.27%	172	1.77%	4,238	43.68%	9,702
Platte	2,253	59.16%	1,482	38.92%	73	1.92%	771	20.24%	3,808
Sheridan	5,980	55.48%	4,655	43.19%	143	1.33%	1,325	12.29%	10,778
Sublette	1,636	72.81%	576	25.63%	35	1.56%	1,060	47.18%	2,247
Sweetwater	6,780	49.47%	6,720	49.03%	205	1.50%	60	0.44%	13,705
Teton	3,616	61.02%	2,217	37.41%	93	1.57%	1,399	23.61%	5,926
Uinta	3,464	62.97%	1,922	34.94%	115	2.09%	1,542	28.03%	5,501
Washakie	2,538	67.36%	1,197	31.77%	33	0.88%	1,341	35.59%	3,768
Weston	1,988	72.98%	699	25.66%	37	1.36%	1,289	47.32%	2,724
Totals	106,867	60.53%	67,113	38.01%	2,571	1.46%	39,754	22.52%	176,551

== See also ==
- United States presidential elections in Wyoming
- Presidency of George H. W. Bush
