= Burlington, Wyoming =

Town in Big Horn County, Wyoming, United States

- Town
- Location of Burlington in Big Horn County, Wyoming
- Coordinates: 44°26′49″N 108°25′55″W
- Country: United States
- State: Wyoming
- County: Big Horn

Area
  - Total: 1.01 sq mi (2.62 km^{2})
  - Land: 1.01 sq mi (2.62 km^{2})
  - Water: 0 sq mi (0.00 km^{2})
- Elevation: 4,433 ft (1,351 m)

Population (2020)
  - Total: 314
  - Density: 338.2/sq mi (130.58/km^{2})
- Time zone: UTC-7 (Mountain (MST))
  - Summer (DST): UTC-6 (MDT)
- ZIP code: 82411
- Area code: 307
- FIPS code: 56-11120
- GNIS feature ID: 2411745
- Website: burlingtonwy.gov

Burlington is a town in Big Horn County, Wyoming, United States. As of the 2020 census, Burlington had a population of 314.

== Geography ==
According to the United States Census Bureau, the town has a total area of 1.01 square miles (2.62 km^{2}), all land.

== Demographics ==
Historical population
Census	Pop.	Note	%±
1990	184		—
2000	250		35.9%
2010	288		15.2%
2020	314		9.0%
U.S. Decennial Census

Burlington's mascot is the husky.

=== 2010 census ===
As of the census of 2010, there were 288 people, 86 households, and 68 families living in the town. The population density was 285.1 inhabitants per square mile (110.1/km^{2}). There were 95 housing units at an average density of 94.1 per square mile (36.3/km^{2}). The racial makeup of the town was 91.3% White, 0.3% African American, 0.3% Asian, 6.6% from other races, and 1.4% from two or more races. Hispanic or Latino of any race were 13.9% of the population.

There were 86 households, of which 44.2% had children under the age of 18 living with them, 67.4% were married couples living together, 5.8% had a female householder with no husband present, 5.8% had a male householder with no wife present, and 20.9% were non-families. 17.4% of all households were made up of individuals, and 10.5% had someone living alone who was 65 years of age or older. The average household size was 3.35 and the average family size was 3.85.

The median age in the town was 27 years. 39.6% of residents were under the age of 18; 8.7% were between the ages of 18 and 24; 19.1% were from 25 to 44; 18% were from 45 to 64; and 14.6% were 65 years of age or older. The gender makeup of the town was 52.4% male and 47.6% female.

=== 2000 census ===
As of the census of 2000, there were 250 people, 76 households, and 58 families living in the town. The population density was 246.6 people per square mile (95.6/km^{2}). There were 87 housing units at an average density of 85.8 per square mile (33.3/km^{2}). The racial makeup of the town was 88.80% White, 0.80% Native American, 1.20% Pacific Islander, 8.80% from other races, and 0.40% from two or more races. Hispanic or Latino of any race were 10.00% of the population.

There were 76 households, out of which 46.1% had children under the age of 18 living with them, 71.1% were married couples living together, 5.3% had a female householder with no husband present, and 22.4% were non-families. 21.1% of all households were made up of individuals, and 10.5% had someone living alone who was 65 years of age or older. The average household size was 3.29 and the average family size was 3.90.

In the town, the population was spread out, with 44.4% under the age of 18, 2.8% from 18 to 24, 24.8% from 25 to 44, 13.2% from 45 to 64, and 14.8% who were 65 years of age or older. The median age was 29 years. For every 100 females, there were 101.6 males. For every 100 females age 18 and over, there were 98.6 males.

The median income for a household in the town was $28,281, and the median income for a family was $31,875. Males had a median income of $29,375 versus $15,625 for females. The per capita income for the town was $13,129. About 7.7% of families and 15.1% of the population were below the poverty line, including 19.5% of those under the age of eighteen and 2.4% of those 65 or over.

== Education ==
Public education in the town of Burlington is provided by Big Horn County School District #1. Children attend Burlington Elementary School (grades K-5), Burlington Junior High School (grades 6–8), and Burlington High School (grades 9-12).

== Mayor ==
The mayor of Burlington is Gary Brunko.

== See also ==
- List of municipalities in Wyoming
