= 1996 United States presidential election in Wyoming =

- November 5, 1996

Nominee	Bob Dole	Bill Clinton	Ross Perot
Party	Republican	Democratic	Independent
Alliance			Reform
Home state	Kansas	Arkansas	Texas
Running mate	Jack Kemp	Al Gore	Patrick Choate
Electoral vote	3	0	0
Popular vote	105,388	77,934	25,928
Percentage	49.81%	36.84%	12.25%

Dole
30–40%
40–50%
50–60%
60–70%
70–80%
80–90%
90–100%
Clinton
30–40%
40–50%
50–60%
60–70%
70–80%
No data
President before election
Bill Clinton
Democratic
Elected President
Bill Clinton
Democratic

The 1996 United States presidential election in Wyoming took place on November 5, 1996, as part of the 1996 United States presidential election. Voters chose three representatives, or electors to the Electoral College, who voted for president and vice president.

Wyoming was won by Senator Bob Dole (R-KS), with Dole winning 49.81 percent to 36.84 percent over President Bill Clinton (D) by a margin of 12.97 points. Billionaire businessman Ross Perot (Independent-TX) finished in third, with 12.25 percent of the popular vote.

With 12.25 percent of the popular vote, Wyoming would prove to be Perot's fourth-strongest state in the 1996 election after Maine, Montana and Idaho. This is the last time a Democrat won any counties other than Albany or Teton counties. As of the 2024 presidential election, this remains the last time that Sweetwater County has voted for a Democratic presidential candidate, as well as the last time that a Republican failed to win a majority of the state's vote, or won by a margin of less than 30 points. Clinton became the first president to win two terms without ever carrying the state.

== Results ==
1996 United States presidential election in Wyoming
Party	Candidate	Running mate	Votes	Percentage	Electoral votes
Republican	Bob Dole	Jack Kemp	105,388	49.81%	3
Democratic	Bill Clinton (incumbent)	Al Gore (incumbent)	77,934	36.84%	0
Independent	Ross Perot	Patrick Choate	25,928	12.25%	0
Libertarian	Harry Browne	Jo Jorgensen	1,739	0.82%	0
Natural Law	John Hagelin	Mike Tompkins	582	0.28%	0
Write-in	Ralph Nader	Winona LaDuke	466	0.22%	0

=== Results by county ===
County	Bob Dole Republican		Bill Clinton Democratic		Ross Perot Independent		Harry Browne Libertarian		John Hagelin Natural Law		Margin		Total votes cast
County	#	%	#	%	#	%	#	%	#	%	#	%	Total votes cast
Albany	5,967	42.82%	6,399	45.92%	1,333	9.57%	188	1.35%	49	0.35%	-432	-3.10%	13,936
Big Horn	2,821	58.30%	1,438	29.72%	545	11.26%	29	0.60%	6	0.12%	1,383	28.58%	4,839
Campbell	6,382	53.68%	3,468	29.17%	1,954	16.44%	65	0.55%	20	0.17%	2,914	24.51%	11,889
Carbon	2,930	44.96%	2,690	41.28%	855	13.12%	31	0.48%	11	0.17%	240	3.68%	6,517
Converse	2,702	55.02%	1,520	30.95%	639	13.01%	42	0.86%	8	0.16%	1,182	24.07%	4,911
Crook	1,698	60.93%	651	23.36%	394	14.14%	37	1.33%	7	0.25%	1,047	37.57%	2,787
Fremont	7,554	50.28%	5,445	36.24%	1,840	12.25%	138	0.92%	47	0.31%	2,109	14.04%	15,024
Goshen	2,989	54.22%	1,923	34.88%	547	9.92%	36	0.65%	18	0.33%	1,066	19.34%	5,513
Hot Springs	1,348	55.34%	779	31.98%	287	11.78%	17	0.70%	5	0.21%	569	23.36%	2,436
Johnson	2,071	62.59%	815	24.63%	378	11.42%	37	1.12%	8	0.24%	1,256	37.96%	3,309
Laramie	16,924	49.97%	13,676	40.38%	2,958	8.73%	242	0.71%	69	0.20%	3,248	9.59%	33,869
Lincoln	3,764	57.59%	1,803	27.59%	906	13.86%	50	0.76%	13	0.20%	1,961	30.00%	6,536
Natrona	13,182	46.72%	11,240	39.84%	3,524	12.49%	207	0.73%	62	0.22%	1,942	6.88%	28,215
Niobrara	757	58.01%	325	24.90%	209	16.02%	14	1.07%	0	0.00%	432	33.11%	1,305
Park	7,430	61.42%	3,240	26.78%	1,318	10.89%	91	0.75%	19	0.16%	4,190	34.64%	12,098
Platte	2,155	48.89%	1,631	37.00%	579	13.14%	39	0.88%	4	0.09%	524	11.89%	4,408
Sheridan	5,892	48.91%	4,594	38.14%	1,414	11.74%	91	0.76%	55	0.46%	1,298	10.77%	12,046
Sublette	1,829	62.15%	677	23.00%	401	13.63%	31	1.05%	5	0.17%	1,152	39.15%	2,943
Sweetwater	5,591	35.76%	7,088	45.34%	2,792	17.86%	129	0.83%	34	0.22%	-1,497	-9.58%	15,634
Teton	3,918	43.54%	4,042	44.92%	839	9.32%	101	1.12%	98	1.09%	-124	-1.38%	8,998
Uinta	3,471	48.09%	2,414	33.44%	1,242	17.21%	79	1.09%	12	0.17%	1,057	14.65%	7,218
Washakie	2,250	56.73%	1,205	30.38%	470	11.85%	20	0.50%	21	0.53%	1,045	26.35%	3,966
Weston	1,763	55.55%	871	27.44%	504	15.88%	25	0.79%	11	0.35%	892	28.11%	3,174
Total	105,388	49.81%	77,934	36.84%	25,928	12.25%	1,739	0.82%	582	0.28%	27,454	12.97%	211,571

Counties that flipped from Democratic to Republican

- Carbon
- Natrona
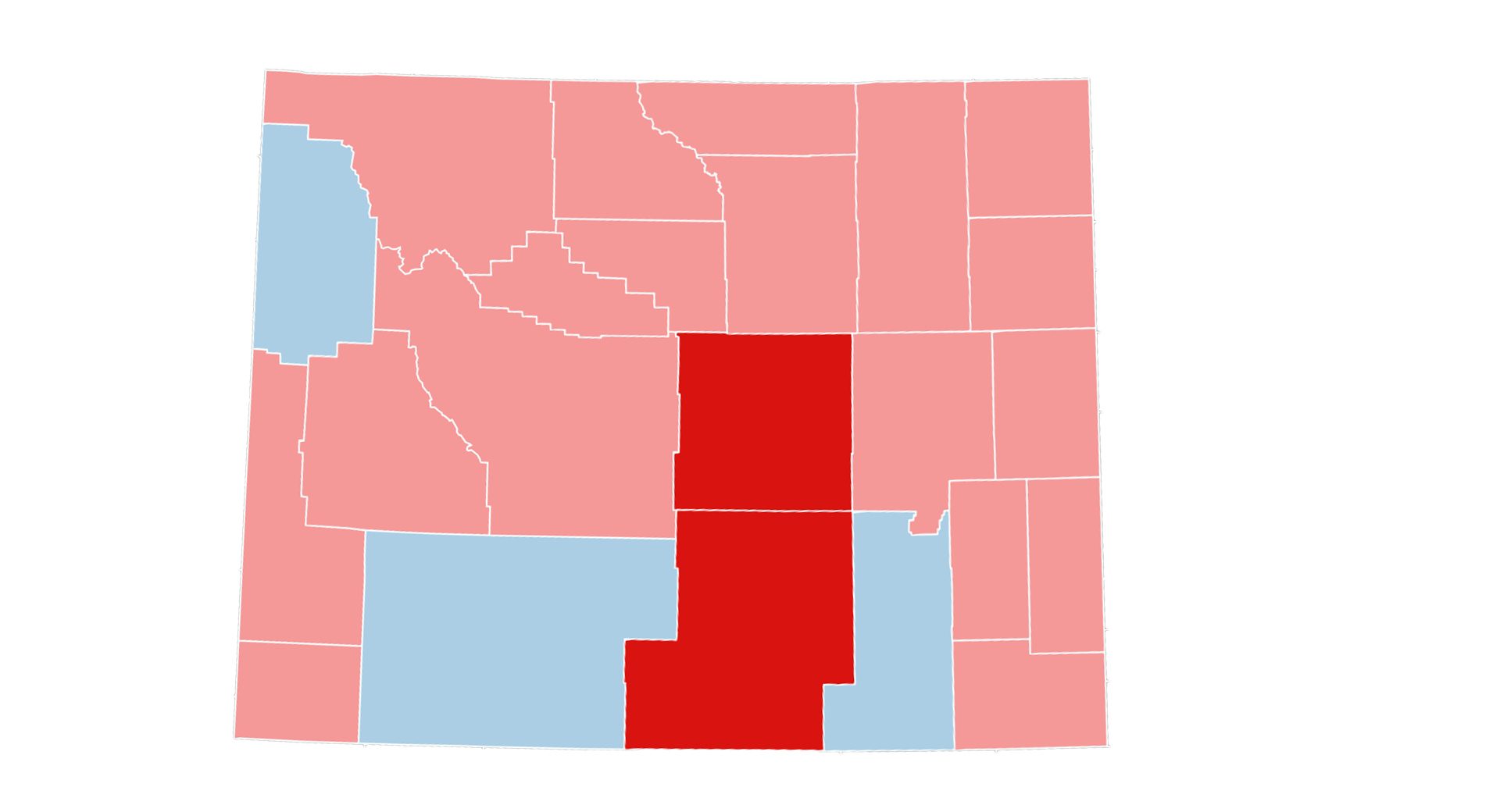

=== By congressional district ===
Due to the state's low population, only one congressional district is allocated. This district, called the at-large district, because it covers the entire state, and thus is equivalent to the statewide election results.

District	Dole	Clinton	Representative
At-large	49.81%	36.84%	Barbara Cubin

== See also ==
- United States presidential elections in Wyoming
- Presidency of Bill Clinton
