= Park County, Wyoming =

County in Wyoming, United States

- County
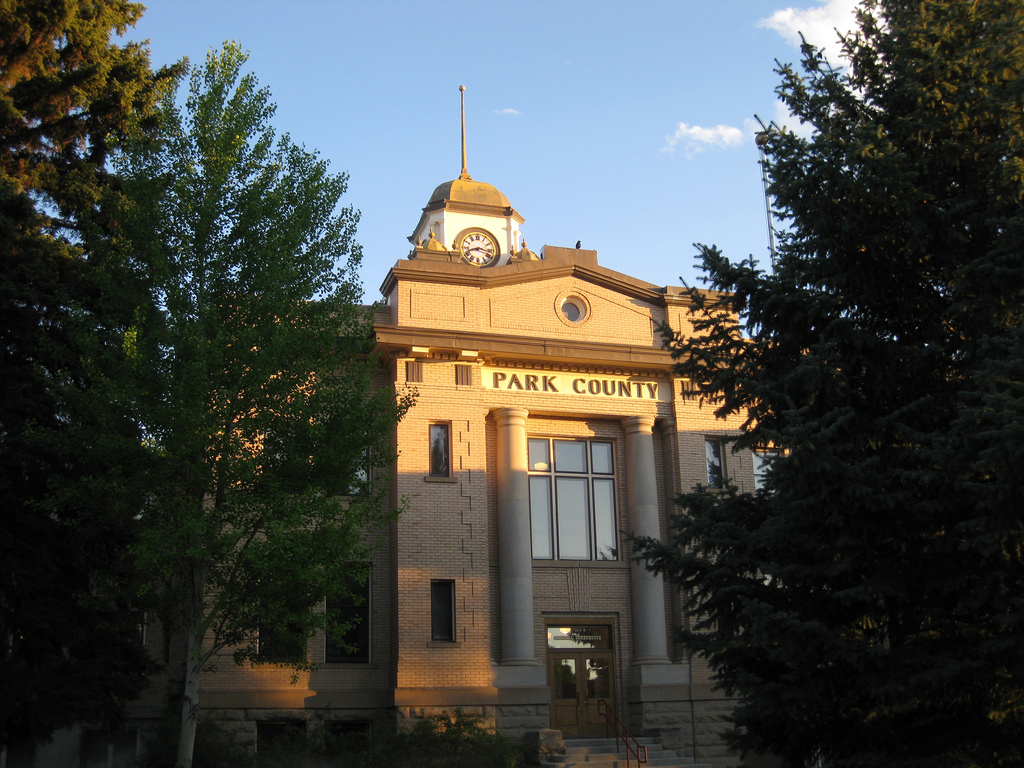
- Park County Courthouse in Cody

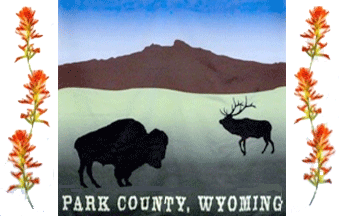
- Flag

- Location within the U.S. state of Wyoming
- Coordinates: 44°29′N 109°34′W
- Country: United States
- State: Wyoming
- Founded: February 15, 1909 (established); 1911 (organized)
- Named for: Yellowstone National Park
- Seat: Cody
- Largest city: Cody

Area
  - Total: 6,967 sq mi (18,040 km^{2})
  - Land: 6,942 sq mi (17,980 km^{2})
  - Water: 25 sq mi (65 km^{2}) 0.4%

Population (2020)
  - Total: 29,624
  - Estimate (2025): 31,171 ▲
  - Density: 4.267/sq mi (1.648/km^{2})
- Time zone: UTC−7 (Mountain)
  - Summer (DST): UTC−6 (MDT)
- Congressional district: At-large
- Website: parkcounty-wy.gov

Park County is a county in the U.S. state of Wyoming. As of the 2020 United States census, the population was 29,624. The county seat is Cody. Park County is a major tourism destination. The county has over 53 percent of Yellowstone National Park's land area. Many attractions abound, including the Buffalo Bill Historical Center, the Cody Stampede Rodeo, the Ghost Town of Kirwin, and the western museum Old Trail Town.

== History ==
Wyoming gained separate territorial status in 1868. Before that, most of the state's area was included in either Laramie County (part of the Dakota Territory) or as unorganized territory within the Dakota Territory. Wyoming Territory was established on July 25, 1868, at which time Laramie County was assigned to this jurisdiction. The area known as Park County was established as Carter County, then Sweetwater County. In 1884 it was assigned to Fremont County; this continued until 1896, when it was assigned to Big Horn County.

Wyoming achieved statehood in 1890. The land in modern Park County continued as part of Big Horn County until 1909, when Park County was authorized. The county governing structure was put in place during 1911; a courthouse was constructed 1911–1912. An addition to the building was completed in 1983, and the complete building was restored in 1985. The county was named for Yellowstone National Park which is mostly within the limits of Park County.

Immigrants from Ireland and Germany settled in what would become Park County in the 1870s. Immigrants from England were the largest immigrant group in Park County in the late 1800s and early 1900s. In 1911 when the county was organized the largest population group in the county were first generation English immigrants and their Wyoming-born children. Many English immigrants who had settled in Wyoming and become American citizens remained connected to England, many of the children of these English immigrants who had been born and raised in Wyoming joined the Canadian military in order to fight alongside Britain during World War I, and subsequently, when America joined the war many volunteered to join the United States military before the U.S. officially instituted a draft.

In 1913, Hot Springs County was created from portions of Park County, Big Horn County, and Fremont County. Park County also had minor boundary adjustments in 1929 and 1931, but otherwise its boundaries have remained unchanged.

== Geography ==
Much of Park County is held under state or federal control. Most of the Shoshone National Forest, the first national forest, and a portion of Yellowstone National Park, the first national park, fall within Park County boundaries. Three rivers flow through Park County: the Greybull and Shoshone Rivers which are tributaries to the Big Horn River, and the Clark's Fork River which flows into the Yellowstone River.

According to the US Census Bureau, the county has a total area of 6,967 square miles (18,040 km^{2}), of which 6,942 square miles (17,980 km^{2}) is land and 25 square miles (65 km^{2}) (0.4%) is water.

=== Adjacent counties ===
- Park County, Montana – north
- Carbon County, Montana – northeast
- Big Horn County – east
- Washakie County – east-southeast
- Hot Springs County – southeast
- Fremont County – south
- Teton County – southwest
- Gallatin County, Montana – northwest

=== National protected areas ===
- Bridger-Teton National Forest (part)
- Shoshone National Forest (part)
- Yellowstone National Park (part)

=== Major highways ===
- U.S. Highway 14
- U.S. Highway 14A
- U.S. Highway 16
- U.S. Highway 20
- U.S. Highway 191
- U.S. Highway 212
- U.S. Highway 287
- Wyoming Highway 120
- Wyoming Highway 296

== Demographics ==
Historical population
Census	Pop.	Note	%±
1910	4,909		—
1920	7,298		48.7%
1930	8,207		12.5%
1940	10,976		33.7%
1950	15,182		38.3%
1960	16,874		11.1%
1970	17,752		5.2%
1980	21,639		21.9%
1990	23,178		7.1%
2000	25,786		11.3%
2010	28,205		9.4%
2020	29,624		5.0%
2025 (est.)	31,171	▲	5.2%
US Decennial Census; 1870–2000 2010–2016

=== 2020 census ===
As of the 2020 census, the county had a population of 29,624. Of the residents, 20.5% were under the age of 18 and 24.6% were 65 years of age or older; the median age was 45.7 years. For every 100 females there were 97.4 males, and for every 100 females age 18 and over there were 95.9 males.

Park County, Wyoming – Racial and ethnic composition Note: the US Census treats Hispanic/Latino as an ethnic category. This table excludes Latinos from the racial categories and assigns them to a separate category. Hispanics/Latinos may be of any race.
Race / Ethnicity (NH = Non-Hispanic)	Pop 2000	Pop 2010	Pop 2020	% 2000	% 2010	% 2020
White alone (NH)	24,356	26,090	26,316	94.45%	92.50%	88.83%
Black or African American alone (NH)	19	50	59	0.07%	0.18%	0.20%
Native American or Alaska Native alone (NH)	104	139	120	0.40%	0.49%	0.41%
Asian alone (NH)	111	164	211	0.43%	0.58%	0.71%
Pacific Islander alone (NH)	12	25	17	0.05%	0.09%	0.06%
Other race alone (NH)	16	22	148	0.06%	0.08%	0.50%
Mixed race or Multiracial (NH)	209	350	1,056	0.81%	1.24%	3.56%
Hispanic or Latino (any race)	959	1,365	1,697	3.72%	4.84%	5.73%
Total	25,786	28,205	29,624	100.00%	100.00%	100.00%

The racial makeup of the county was 90.7% White, 0.2% Black or African American, 0.5% American Indian and Alaska Native, 0.7% Asian, 1.9% from some other race, and 5.9% from two or more races. Hispanic or Latino residents of any race comprised 5.7% of the population.

There were 12,679 households in the county, of which 24.1% had children under the age of 18 living with them and 22.8% had a female householder with no spouse or partner present. About 30.0% of all households were made up of individuals and 14.1% had someone living alone who was 65 years of age or older.

There were 14,523 housing units, of which 12.7% were vacant. Among occupied housing units, 71.7% were owner-occupied and 28.3% were renter-occupied. The homeowner vacancy rate was 1.5% and the rental vacancy rate was 8.7%.

=== 2010 census ===
As of the 2010 United States census, there were 28,205 people, 11,885 households, and 7,777 families in the county. The population density was 4.1 people per square mile (1.6 people/km^{2}). There were 13,562 housing units at an average density of 2.0 units per square mile (0.77 units/km^{2}). The racial makeup of the county was 95.6% white, 0.6% Asian, 0.6% American Indian, 0.2% black or African American, 0.1% Pacific islander, 1.4% from other races, and 1.6% from two or more races. Those of Hispanic or Latino origin made up 4.8% of the population. In terms of ancestry, 31.7% were German, 16.3% were English, 15.4% were Irish, and 6.3% were American.

Of the 11,885 households, 26.1% had children under the age of 18 living with them, 54.9% were married couples living together, 7.2% had a female householder with no husband present, 34.6% were non-families, and 28.5% of all households were made up of individuals. The average household size was 2.29 and the average family size was 2.81. The median age was 43.6 years.

The median income for a household in the county was $46,637 and the median income for a family was $58,297. Males had a median income of $40,036 versus $27,450 for females. The per capita income for the county was $26,203. About 5.5% of families and 9.0% of the population were below the poverty line, including 14.2% of those under age 18 and 6.4% of those age 65 or over.

=== 2000 census ===
As of the 2000 United States census, there were 25,786 people, 10,312 households, and 7,094 families in the county. The population density was 4 people per square mile (1.5 people/km^{2}). There were 11,869 housing units at an average density of 2 units per square mile (0.77 units/km^{2}). The racial makeup of the county was 96.46% White, 0.09% Black or African American, 0.47% Native American, 0.44% Asian, 0.05% Pacific Islander, 1.41% from other races, and 1.08% from two or more races. 3.72% of the population were Hispanic or Latino of any race. 26.3% were of German and 13.3% English ancestry.

There were 10,312 households, out of which 30.10% had children under the age of 18 living with them, 58.90% were married couples living together, 7.10% had a female householder with no husband present, and 31.20% were non-families. 26.20% of all households were made up of individuals, and 10.00% had someone living alone who was 65 years of age or older. The average household size was 2.42 and the average family size was 2.92.

The county population contained 24.40% under the age of 18, 9.10% from 18 to 24, 25.20% from 25 to 44, 26.70% from 45 to 64, and 14.50% who were 65 years of age or older. The median age was 40 years. For every 100 females there were 95.00 males. For every 100 females age 18 and over, there were 93.10 males.

The median income for a household in the county was $35,829, and the median income for a family was $41,406. Males had a median income of $33,452 versus $20,500 for females. The per capita income for the county was $18,020. About 8.40% of families and 12.70% of the population were below the poverty line, including 16.60% of those under age 18 and 8.30% of those age 65 or over.

== Communities ==
=== Cities ===
- Cody (county seat)
- Powell

=== Towns ===
- Frannie (partial)
- Meeteetse

=== Census-designated places ===
- Garland
- Mammoth
- Ralston

=== Unincorporated communities ===
- Badger Basin
- Canyon Village
- Clark
- Devils Den
- Dry Creek
- Dumbbell
- Elk Basin
- Fossil Forest
- Kirwin
- Pahaska Tepee
- Tower Junction
- Wapiti
- Willwood
- Yanceys

== Politics ==
Like almost all of Wyoming, Park County is overwhelmingly Republican. The last Democrat to carry the county in a presidential election was Lyndon B. Johnson in 1964.

United States presidential election results for Park County, Wyoming
Year	Republican		Democratic		Third party(ies)	
Year	No.	%	No.	%	No.	%
1912	534	29.80%	672	37.50%	586	32.70%
1916	1,092	46.89%	1,146	49.21%	91	3.91%
1920	1,630	70.53%	666	28.82%	15	0.65%
1924	1,607	55.47%	530	18.29%	760	26.23%
1928	2,175	66.72%	1,062	32.58%	23	0.71%
1932	1,600	42.59%	2,043	54.38%	114	3.03%
1936	1,618	37.50%	2,594	60.12%	103	2.39%
1940	2,512	47.56%	2,747	52.01%	23	0.44%
1944	2,571	53.25%	2,257	46.75%	0	0.00%
1948	2,655	51.60%	2,461	47.83%	29	0.56%
1952	5,067	70.62%	2,084	29.05%	24	0.33%
1956	4,397	69.17%	1,960	30.83%	0	0.00%
1960	4,510	64.37%	2,496	35.63%	0	0.00%
1964	3,698	49.68%	3,745	50.32%	0	0.00%
1968	4,677	65.56%	1,852	25.96%	605	8.48%
1972	5,890	74.79%	1,950	24.76%	35	0.44%
1976	5,878	68.33%	2,656	30.88%	68	0.79%
1980	6,435	73.03%	1,718	19.50%	658	7.47%
1984	7,994	79.19%	1,965	19.47%	136	1.35%
1988	6,884	70.95%	2,646	27.27%	172	1.77%
1992	5,218	46.55%	2,771	24.72%	3,220	28.73%
1996	7,430	61.42%	3,240	26.78%	1,428	11.80%
2000	9,884	77.00%	2,424	18.88%	528	4.11%
2004	10,917	76.71%	3,007	21.13%	307	2.16%
2008	10,839	72.33%	3,757	25.07%	389	2.60%
2012	11,234	76.90%	2,927	20.04%	447	3.06%
2016	11,115	73.63%	2,535	16.79%	1,445	9.57%
2020	12,813	76.65%	3,410	20.40%	494	2.96%
2024	13,084	78.15%	3,259	19.46%	400	2.39%

== Education ==
School districts include:

- Big Horn County School District 1
- Big Horn County School District 2
- Big Horn County School District 4
- Park County School District 1
- Park County School District 6
- Park County School District 16

The portion of Park County in Yellowstone National Park is not in any school district. K-12 students in that section are sent to Gardiner Public Schools in Gardiner, Montana.

The Yellowstone Park School a.k.a. the Mammoth School, operated from 1921, until 2008.

== See also ==
- National Register of Historic Places listings in Park County, Wyoming
- Wyoming
  - List of cities and towns in Wyoming
  - List of counties in Wyoming
  - Wyoming statistical areas
