= Burlington High School (Wyoming) =

Public high school in Burlington, Wyoming, USA

Coordinates: 44°27′4″N 108°26′1″W

Location
- 109 School Avenue; Burlington, (Big Horn County), Wyoming 82411; United States

Information
- Type: Public high school
- Principal: Autumn Tempany
- Staff: 8.57 (FTE)
- Enrollment: 72 (2023-2024)
- Student to teacher ratio: 8.40
- Colors: Orange and black
- Nickname: Huskies

Burlington High School is a public high school in Burlington, Wyoming, United States. The school is part of Big Horn County School District #1. The mascot is the huskies. It is a 1A sized school for Wyoming athletics.
