= Deaver, Wyoming =

Town in Big Horn County, Wyoming, United States

- Town
- Location of Deaver in Big Horn County, Wyoming
- Coordinates: 44°53′20″N 108°35′46″W
- Country: United States
- State: Wyoming
- County: Big Horn

Area
  - Total: 1.01 sq mi (2.62 km^{2})
  - Land: 1.01 sq mi (2.62 km^{2})
  - Water: 0 sq mi (0.00 km^{2})
- Elevation: 4,111 ft (1,253 m)

Population (2020)
  - Total: 154
  - Density: 178.7/sq mi (69.01/km^{2})
- Time zone: UTC-7 (Mountain (MST))
  - Summer (DST): UTC-6 (MDT)
- ZIP code: 82421
- Area code: 307
- FIPS code: 56-19530
- GNIS feature ID: 2412413

Deaver is a town in Big Horn County, Wyoming, United States. As of the 2020 census, Deaver had a population of 154.

== Geography ==
According to the United States Census Bureau, the town has a total area of 1.01 square miles (2.62 km^{2}), all land.

=== Climate ===
According to the Köppen Climate Classification system, Deaver has a cold desert climate, abbreviated "BWk" on climate maps. The hottest temperature recorded in Deaver was 109 °F (43 °C) on July 13, 2026, while the coldest temperature recorded was −42 °F (−41 °C) on December 13, 1919.

Climate data for Deaver, Wyoming, 1991–2020 normals, extremes 1919–present
Month	Jan	Feb	Mar	Apr	May	Jun	Jul	Aug	Sep	Oct	Nov	Dec	Year
Record high °F (°C)	64 (18)	74 (23)	82 (28)	90 (32)	98 (37)	105 (41)	109 (43)	104 (40)	102 (39)	91 (33)	76 (24)	66 (19)	109 (43)
Mean maximum °F (°C)	49.0 (9.4)	54.9 (12.7)	69.0 (20.6)	79.7 (26.5)	87.3 (30.7)	94.4 (34.7)	100.0 (37.8)	98.4 (36.9)	91.9 (33.3)	80.7 (27.1)	64.0 (17.8)	53.1 (11.7)	100.3 (37.9)
Mean daily maximum °F (°C)	30.6 (−0.8)	36.6 (2.6)	50.8 (10.4)	59.9 (15.5)	69.6 (20.9)	79.9 (26.6)	89.5 (31.9)	87.8 (31.0)	76.7 (24.8)	61.2 (16.2)	45.4 (7.4)	32.9 (0.5)	60.1 (15.6)
Daily mean °F (°C)	18.6 (−7.4)	24.3 (−4.3)	37.0 (2.8)	46.0 (7.8)	56.1 (13.4)	65.5 (18.6)	73.5 (23.1)	71.3 (21.8)	60.5 (15.8)	46.9 (8.3)	32.6 (0.3)	20.9 (−6.2)	46.1 (7.8)
Mean daily minimum °F (°C)	6.5 (−14.2)	11.9 (−11.2)	23.3 (−4.8)	32.0 (0.0)	42.6 (5.9)	51.1 (10.6)	57.4 (14.1)	54.9 (12.7)	44.4 (6.9)	32.5 (0.3)	19.8 (−6.8)	8.8 (−12.9)	32.1 (0.0)
Mean minimum °F (°C)	−14.8 (−26.0)	−8.6 (−22.6)	2.7 (−16.3)	16.2 (−8.8)	27.4 (−2.6)	38.5 (3.6)	46.7 (8.2)	43.1 (6.2)	30.5 (−0.8)	15.5 (−9.2)	−0.1 (−17.8)	−9.0 (−22.8)	−18.0 (−27.8)
Record low °F (°C)	−38 (−39)	−39 (−39)	−24 (−31)	−11 (−24)	14 (−10)	23 (−5)	35 (2)	25 (−4)	11 (−12)	−6 (−21)	−23 (−31)	−42 (−41)	−42 (−41)
Average precipitation inches (mm)	0.09 (2.3)	0.15 (3.8)	0.21 (5.3)	0.40 (10)	1.10 (28)	1.09 (28)	0.55 (14)	0.35 (8.9)	0.59 (15)	0.59 (15)	0.24 (6.1)	0.15 (3.8)	5.51 (140.2)
Average snowfall inches (cm)	3.2 (8.1)	2.5 (6.4)	1.3 (3.3)	0.8 (2.0)	0.1 (0.25)	0.0 (0.0)	0.0 (0.0)	0.0 (0.0)	0.0 (0.0)	0.6 (1.5)	1.4 (3.6)	2.3 (5.8)	12.2 (30.95)
Average precipitation days (≥ 0.01 in)	2.3	2.4	1.8	3.8	5.4	5.6	3.6	3.4	3.2	3.3	1.7	2.0	38.5
Average snowy days (≥ 0.1 in)	2.0	1.9	0.8	0.5	0.1	0.0	0.0	0.0	0.0	0.4	0.7	1.9	8.3
Source 1: NOAA
Source 2: National Weather Service

== Demographics ==
Historical population
Census	Pop.	Note	%±
1920	142		—
1930	85		−40.1%
1940	111		30.6%
1950	118		6.3%
1960	121		2.5%
1970	112		−7.4%
1980	178		58.9%
1990	199		11.8%
2000	177		−11.1%
2010	178		0.6%
2020	154		−13.5%
U.S. Decennial Census

=== 2010 census ===
As of the census of 2010, there were 178 people, 66 households, and 48 families residing in the town. The population density was 176.2 inhabitants per square mile (68.0/km^{2}). There were 84 housing units at an average density of 83.2 per square mile (32.1/km^{2}). The racial makeup of the town was 96.6% White, 2.8% from other races, and 0.6% from two or more races. Hispanic or Latino of any race were 6.7% of the population.

There were 66 households, of which 37.9% had children under the age of 18 living with them, 62.1% were married couples living together, 4.5% had a female householder with no husband present, 6.1% had a male householder with no wife present, and 27.3% were non-families. 18.2% of all households were made up of individuals, and 3% had someone living alone who was 65 years of age or older. The average household size was 2.70 and the average family size was 3.08.

The median age in the town was 39 years. 26.4% of residents were under the age of 18; 10.7% were between the ages of 18 and 24; 19.6% were from 25 to 44; 33.8% were from 45 to 64; and 9.6% were 65 years of age or older. The gender makeup of the town was 53.4% male and 46.6% female.

=== 2000 census ===
As of the census of 2000, there were 177 people, 65 households, and 44 families residing in the town. The population density was 174.0 people per square mile (67.0/km^{2}). There were 80 housing units at an average density of 78.7 per square mile (30.3/km^{2}). The racial makeup of the town was 94.92% White, 1.13% Native American, 2.82% from other races, and 1.13% from two or more races. Hispanic or Latino of any race were 8.47% of the population.

There were 65 households, out of which 46.2% had children under the age of 18 living with them, 60.0% were married couples living together, 4.6% had a female householder with no husband present, and 32.3% were non-families. 26.2% of all households were made up of individuals, and 9.2% had someone living alone who was 65 years of age or older. The average household size was 2.72 and the average family size was 3.34.

In the town, the population was spread out, with 35.0% under the age of 18, 6.8% from 18 to 24, 32.2% from 25 to 44, 17.5% from 45 to 64, and 8.5% who were 65 years of age or older. The median age was 30 years. For every 100 females, there were 110.7 males. For every 100 females age 18 and over, there were 101.8 males.

The median income for a household in the town was $31,071, and the median income for a family was $34,063. Males had a median income of $31,563 versus $15,938 for females. The per capita income for the town was $14,134. About 14.0% of families and 10.4% of the population were below the poverty line, including 6.3% of those under the age of eighteen and none of those 65 or over.

== Education ==
Public education in Deaver is provided by Big Horn County School District Number 1. The district operates Rocky Mountain Middle/High School in Cowley, and Rocky Mountain Elementary School in Cowley.

Deaver has a public library, a branch of the Big Horn County Library System.

== See also ==
- List of municipalities in Wyoming
