= Cowley, Wyoming =

- Town
- Location of Cowley in Big Horn County, Wyoming
- Coordinates: 44°52′45″N 108°28′04″W
- Country: United States
- State: Wyoming
- County: Big Horn
- Settled: May 2, 1900
- Incorporated: May 1907

Area
  - Total: 0.87 sq mi (2.26 km^{2})
  - Land: 0.87 sq mi (2.26 km^{2})
  - Water: 0 sq mi (0.00 km^{2})
- Elevation: 3,993 ft (1,217 m)

Population (2020)
  - Total: 762
  - Density: 870/sq mi (337/km^{2})
- Time zone: UTC-7 (MST)
  - Summer (DST): UTC-6 (MST)
- Zip code: 82420
- Area code: 307
- FIPS code: 56-17645
- GNIS feature ID: 2412379
- Website: townofcowley.com

Cowley is a town in Big Horn County, Wyoming, United States. The population was 762 at the 2020 census.

== History ==
In February 1900 a group was sent by the Church of Jesus Christ of Latter Day Saints to create a settlement in northern Wyoming. The group met with William Cody who was building an irrigation canal to help find a site. In May 1900 the first group arrived. They started building the Sidon irrigation canal which was eventually completed in 1904. The post office was established in October 1900 with William W. Graham as postmaster. The community was named after Matthias F. Cowley, a leader in .

A school was built in 1901. Cowley was incorporated in May 1907.

== Geography ==
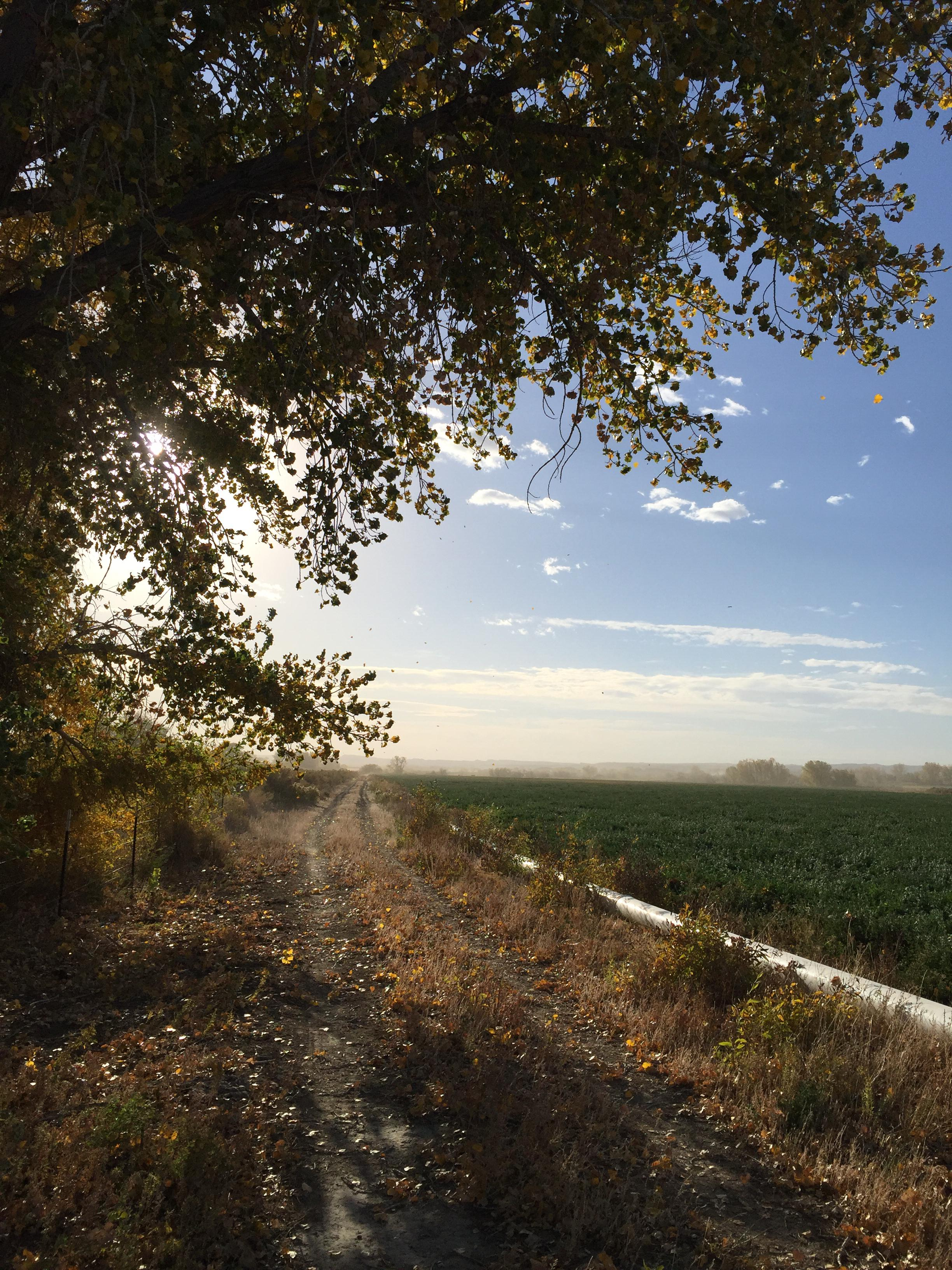
Alfalfa fields just south of Cowley, October 2015

Cowley is at the foot of the Bighorn Mountains.

According to the United States Census Bureau, the town has a total area of 0.87 square miles (2.25 km^{2}), all land.

== Demographics ==
Historical population
Census	Pop.	Note	%±
1910	574		—
1920	687		19.7%
1930	526		−23.4%
1940	491		−6.7%
1950	463		−5.7%
1960	459		−0.9%
1970	366		−20.3%
1980	455		24.3%
1990	477		4.8%
2000	560		17.4%
2010	655		17.0%
2020	762		16.3%
U.S. Decennial Census

=== 2010 census ===
As of the census of 2010, there were 655 people, 229 households, and 169 families residing in the town. The population density was 779.8 inhabitants per square mile (301.1/km^{2}). There were 250 housing units at an average density of 297.6 per square mile (114.9/km^{2}). The racial makeup of the town was 95.4% White, 0.5% Native American, 0.9% Asian, 2.1% from other races, and 1.1% from two or more races. Hispanic or Latino of any race were 4.0% of the population.

There were 229 households, of which 37.1% had children under the age of 18 living with them, 63.8% were married couples living together, 7.4% had a female householder with no husband present, 2.6% had a male householder with no wife present, and 26.2% were non-families. 22.3% of all households were made up of individuals, and 12.6% had someone living alone who was 65 years of age or older. The average household size was 2.86 and the average family size was 3.41.

The median age in the town was 36.9 years. 31.8% of residents were under the age of 18; 7% were between the ages of 18 and 24; 22.3% were from 25 to 44; 23.9% were from 45 to 64; and 14.8% were 65 years of age or older. The gender makeup of the town was 49.3% male and 50.7% female.

=== 2000 census ===
As of the census of 2000, there were 560 people, 200 households and 160 families residing in the town. The population density was 796.5 per square mile (308.9/km^{2}). There were 223 housing units at an average density of 317.2 per square mile (123.0/km^{2}). The racial makeup of the town was 97.32% White, 0.18% Asian, 2.14% from other races, and 0.36% from two or more races. Hispanic or Latino of any race were 3.39% of the population.

There were 200 households, of which 41.0% had children under the age of 18 living with them, 70.0% were married couples living together, 7.5% had a female householder with no husband present, and 20.0% were non-families. 18.5% of all households were made up of individuals, and 9.0% had someone living alone who was 65 years of age or older. The average household size was 2.80 and the average family size was 3.19.

In the city the population was spread out, with 31.1% of the population were under the age of 18, 9.3% from 18 to 24, 24.5% from 25 to 44, 22.1% from 45 to 64, and 13.0% who were 65 years of age or older. The median age was 34 years. For every 100 females, there were 97.9 males. For every 100 females age 18 and over, there were 96.9 males.

The median income for a household in the town was $38,750, and the median income for a family was $39,722. Males had a median income of $31,848 versus $20,000 for females. The per capita income for the town was $14,964. About 3.8% of families and 7.2% of the population were below the poverty line, including 10.3% of those under age 18 and 7.8% of those age 65 or over.

== Government ==
Cowley has a mayor and four council members. The current mayor as of March 2026 is local businessman Joel Peterson. Council members are Scott Crosby, Emily Simmons, June Minchow and Max Lewis.

== Arts and culture ==
Each July, Cowley hosts an annual celebration known locally as "Cowley Pioneer Day". It is held on the weekend closest to July 24, to commemorate the town's pioneer heritage. The celebration usually packs in a range of activities including a parade, pioneer heritage program, rodeo, dance, and town barbecue. Cowley's pioneer heritage is also remembered year-round in the Cowley Pioneer Museum, located on Main Street in Cowley, in the same building as the town hall.

The town park has a pool and horseshoe pits. There is also a community center which is used for a variety of events.

== Education ==
Public education in the town of Cowley is provided by Big Horn County School District #1. High School students attend Rocky Mountain High School in Cowley. Middle School students attend Rocky Mountain Middle School also here in Cowley and Elementary students attend Rocky Mountain Elementary School in Cowley.

The Big Horn Academy Building, built in 1916, is located in Cowley. The building was home to Cowley High School from 1925 to 1983.

== See also ==
- List of municipalities in Wyoming
