= Big Horn County, Wyoming =

County in Wyoming, United States

- County
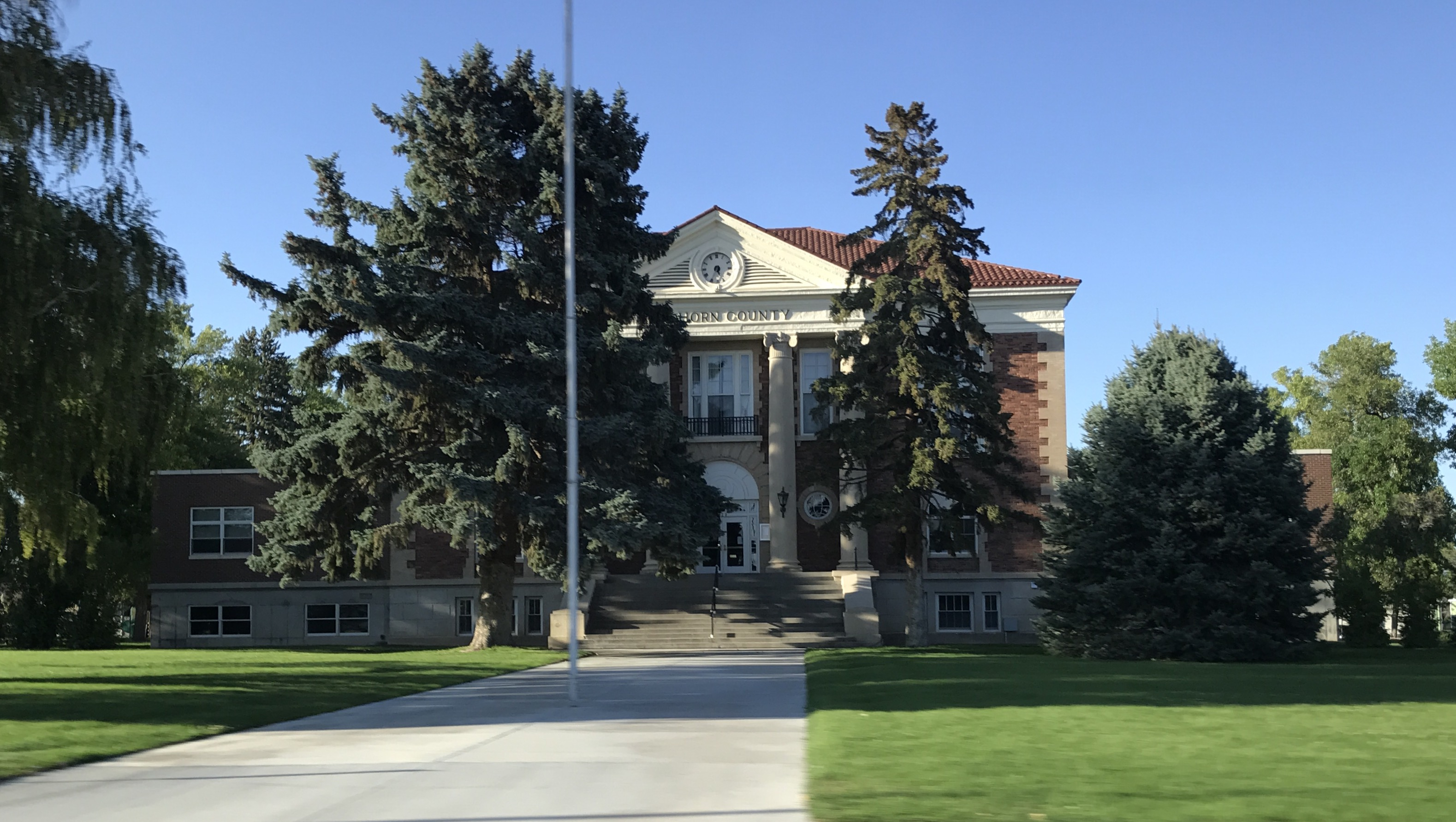
- Big Horn County Courthouse

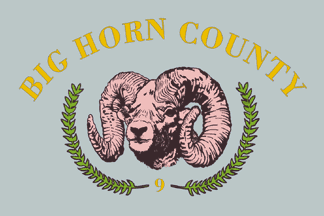
- Flag Logo

- Location within the U.S. state of Wyoming
- Coordinates: 44°32′N 107°59′W
- Country: United States
- State: Wyoming
- Founded: March 12, 1890 (authorized); 1897 (organized)
- Named for: Bighorn Mountains
- Seat: Basin
- Largest town: Lovell

Area
  - Total: 3,159 sq mi (8,180 km^{2})
  - Land: 3,137 sq mi (8,120 km^{2})
  - Water: 22 sq mi (57 km^{2}) 0.7%

Population (2020)
  - Total: 11,521
  - Estimate (2025): 12,024 ▲
  - Density: 3.673/sq mi (1.418/km^{2})
- Time zone: UTC−7 (Mountain)
  - Summer (DST): UTC−6 (MDT)
- Congressional district: At-large
- Website: www.bighorncountywy.gov

Big Horn County is a county in the U.S. state of Wyoming. As of the 2020 United States census, the population was 11,521. The county seat is Basin. Its north boundary abuts the south boundary of Montana.

== History ==
Big Horn County was created by the legislature of Wyoming Territory in March 1890, and was organized in 1897; its area was annexed from Fremont, Johnson, and Sheridan counties. Big Horn County was named for the Big Horn Mountains which form its eastern boundary. Originally, the county included the entire Big Horn Basin, but in 1909 Park County, WY was created from a portion of Big Horn County, and in 1911 Hot Springs and Washakie counties were created from portions of Big Horn, leaving the county with its present borders. There were large amounts of first generation immigrants from England and Germany living in Big Horn County when World War I broke out in Europe.

The two groups went out of their way to maintain cordial relations with one another, and the county did not see the sorts of anti-German sentiment that was common throughout much of the country. While the English residents were outspokenly pro-British, and many of their Wyoming-born sons went to Canada and joined the Canadian Armed Forces in order to serve in the war on England's side, they nonetheless made sure that their German co-workers and neighbors were not harassed or discriminated against. In late 1917 one English rancher referred to the effort as making sure that his German neighbor was always "treated like a gentleman." Another English rancher said that two of his ranch hands were from Germany and he "would hate to see the foolishness of national hatreds inflicted on men as decent as they are." English residents of Big Horn County went out of their way to make sure that German-born residents did not feel unwelcome. German immigrants and their Wyoming-born children were not "anti-British" though they favored America remaining neutral in the conflict. Before the war the most commonly read works of fiction among German-born residents of Big Horn County were German language translations of British adventure stories including The Four Feathers by A. E. W. Mason as well as Sherlock Holmes stories and The Light That Failed by Rudyard Kipling. Consensus among Big Horn County residents of all backgrounds after the war was that the war had ultimately been a tragedy and a "horrible waste of human life."

== Geography ==
According to the US Census Bureau, the county has a total area of 3,159 square miles (8,180 km^{2}), of which 3,137 square miles (8,120 km^{2}) is land and 22 square miles (57 km^{2}) (0.7%) is water.

=== Adjacent counties ===
- Park County – west
- Carbon County, Montana – northwest
- Big Horn County, Montana – northeast
- Sheridan County – east
- Johnson County – southeast
- Washakie County – south

Big Horn County in Wyoming and Montana are one of ten pairs of counties and parishes in the United States with the same name to border each other across state lines. The others are Sabine (Texas and Louisiana), Union (Arkansas and Louisiana), Bristol (Massachusetts and Rhode Island), Kent (Maryland and Delaware), Escambia (Alabama and Florida), Pike (Illinois and Missouri), Teton (Idaho and Wyoming), Park (Montana and Wyoming), and San Juan (New Mexico and Utah - albeit through a single point, the Four Corners).

=== Major highways ===
- U.S. Highway 14
- U.S. Highway 14A
- U.S. Highway 16
- U.S. Highway 20
- U.S. Highway 310
- Wyoming Highway 30
- Wyoming Highway 31
- Wyoming Highway 32
- Wyoming Highway 114
- Wyoming Highway 37

=== Transit ===
- Express Arrow

=== National protected areas ===
- Bighorn Canyon National Recreation Area (part)
- Bighorn National Forest (part)

== Demographics ==
Historical population
Census	Pop.	Note	%±
1900	4,328		—
1910	8,886		105.3%
1920	12,105		36.2%
1930	11,222		−7.3%
1940	12,911		15.1%
1950	13,176		2.1%
1960	11,898		−9.7%
1970	10,202		−14.3%
1980	11,896		16.6%
1990	10,525		−11.5%
2000	11,461		8.9%
2010	11,668		1.8%
2020	11,521		−1.3%
2025 (est.)	12,024	▲	4.4%
US Decennial Census; 1870–2000 2010–2020

=== 2020 census ===
As of the 2020 census, the county had a population of 11,521. Of the residents, 25.1% were under the age of 18 and 22.6% were 65 years of age or older; the median age was 41.9 years. For every 100 females there were 102.3 males, and for every 100 females age 18 and over there were 101.8 males.

Big Horn County, Wyoming – Racial and ethnic composition Note: the US Census treats Hispanic/Latino as an ethnic category. This table excludes Latinos from the racial categories and assigns them to a separate category. Hispanics/Latinos may be of any race.
Race / Ethnicity (NH = Non-Hispanic)	Pop 2000	Pop 2010	Pop 2020	% 2000	% 2010	% 2020
White alone (NH)	10,527	10,435	9,884	91.85%	89.43%	85.79%
Black or African American alone (NH)	9	25	22	0.08%	0.21%	0.19%
Native American or Alaska Native alone (NH)	76	89	98	0.66%	0.76%	0.85%
Asian alone (NH)	24	37	44	0.21%	0.32%	0.38%
Pacific Islander alone (NH)	5	2	6	0.04%	0.02%	0.05%
Other race alone (NH)	9	4	44	0.08%	0.03%	0.38%
Mixed race or Multiracial (NH)	104	92	354	0.91%	0.79%	3.07%
Hispanic or Latino (any race)	707	984	1,069	6.17%	8.43%	9.28%
Total	11,461	11,668	11,521	100.00%	100.00%	100.00%

The racial makeup of the county was 89.2% White, 0.2% Black or African American, 1.3% American Indian and Alaska Native, 0.4% Asian, 2.7% from some other race, and 6.1% from two or more races. Hispanic or Latino residents of any race comprised 9.3% of the population.

There were 4,493 households in the county, of which 29.5% had children under the age of 18 living with them and 21.5% had a female householder with no spouse or partner present. About 28.7% of all households were made up of individuals and 14.2% had someone living alone who was 65 years of age or older.

There were 5,327 housing units, of which 15.7% were vacant. Among occupied housing units, 74.2% were owner-occupied and 25.8% were renter-occupied. The homeowner vacancy rate was 1.9% and the rental vacancy rate was 10.4%.

=== 2010 census ===
As of the 2010 United States census, there were 11,668 people, 4,561 households, and 3,179 families in the county. The population density was 3.7 people per square mile (1.4 people/km^{2}). There were 5,379 housing units at an average density of 1.7 units per square mile (0.66 units/km^{2}). The racial makeup of the county was 94.4% white, 0.9% American Indian, 0.3% Asian, 0.2% black or African American, 3.0% from other races, and 1.2% from two or more races. Those of Hispanic or Latino origin made up 8.4% of the population. In terms of ancestry, 30.0% were German, 22.3% were English, 10.4% were Irish, 7.6% were Scottish, and 5.7% were American.

Of the 4,561 households, 31.0% had children under the age of 18 living with them, 58.2% were married couples living together, 7.6% had a female householder with no husband present, 30.3% were non-families, and 26.2% of all households were made up of individuals. The average household size was 2.52 and the average family size was 3.05. The median age was 41.8 years.

The median income for a household in the county was $48,270 and the median income for a family was $57,705. Males had a median income of $40,762 versus $31,440 for females. The per capita income for the county was $24,486. About 5.7% of families and 8.9% of the population were below the poverty line, including 11.2% of those under age 18 and 7.1% of those age 65 or over.

=== 2000 census ===
As of the 2000 United States census, there were 11,461 people, 4,312 households, and 3,087 families in the county. The population density was 4 people per square mile (1.5 people/km^{2}). There were 5,105 housing units at an average density of 2 units per square mile (0.77 units/km^{2}). The racial makeup of the county was 94.03% White, 0.11% Black or African American, 0.75% Native American, 0.21% Asian, 0.07% Pacific Islander, 3.37% from other races, and 1.46% from two or more races. 6.17% of the population were Hispanic or Latino of any race. 23.0% were of German, 21.4% English, 8.1% American and 8.0% Irish ancestry.

There were 4,312 households, out of which 32.50% had children under the age of 18 living with them, 61.00% were married couples living together, 6.80% had a female householder with no husband present, and 28.40% were non-families. 25.00% of all households were made up of individuals, and 11.90% had someone living alone who was 65 years of age or older. The average household size was 2.60 and the average family size was 3.13.

The county population contained 28.70% under the age of 18, 7.30% from 18 to 24, 22.60% from 25 to 44, 24.60% from 45 to 64, and 16.80% who were 65 years of age or older. The median age was 39 years. For every 100 females there were 100.20 males. For every 100 females age 18 and over, there were 97.10 males.

The median income for a household in the county was $32,682, and the median income for a family was $38,237. Males had a median income of $30,843 versus $19,489 for females. The per capita income for the county was $15,086. About 10.20% of families and 14.10% of the population were below the poverty line, including 19.20% of those under age 18 and 10.00% of those age 65 or over.

== Government and infrastructure ==
The Wyoming Department of Health Wyoming Retirement Center, a nursing home, is located in Basin. The facility was operated by the Wyoming Board of Charities and Reform until that agency was dissolved as a result of a state constitutional amendment passed in November 1990.

Big Horn County voters have been reliably Republican for decades. They have selected the Republican Party candidate in every national election except one since 1936 (as of 2024).

In 2016 the county voted 2.1% for Darrell Castle on the Constitution Party ticket, the highest of any county nationally that year. (Outside of Alaska which does not report 3rd Party Performance on the borough level)

United States presidential election results for Big Horn County, Wyoming
Year	Republican		Democratic		Third party(ies)	
Year	No.	%	No.	%	No.	%
1896	538	46.95%	591	51.57%	17	1.48%
1900	843	63.77%	479	36.23%	0	0.00%
1904	1,962	70.83%	751	27.11%	57	2.06%
1908	2,638	60.28%	1,648	37.66%	90	2.06%
1912	794	35.43%	691	30.83%	756	33.73%
1916	1,239	44.75%	1,493	53.92%	37	1.34%
1920	2,157	65.80%	1,082	33.01%	39	1.19%
1924	2,023	54.45%	459	12.36%	1,233	33.19%
1928	2,646	73.58%	933	25.95%	17	0.47%
1932	2,334	51.15%	2,155	47.23%	74	1.62%
1936	1,996	38.12%	3,156	60.28%	84	1.60%
1940	2,859	52.22%	2,594	47.38%	22	0.40%
1944	2,659	53.47%	2,314	46.53%	0	0.00%
1948	2,429	50.36%	2,370	49.14%	24	0.50%
1952	3,859	68.67%	1,755	31.23%	6	0.11%
1956	3,369	65.01%	1,813	34.99%	0	0.00%
1960	3,449	62.79%	2,044	37.21%	0	0.00%
1964	2,668	49.79%	2,690	50.21%	0	0.00%
1968	2,771	64.07%	1,201	27.77%	353	8.16%
1972	3,244	75.44%	1,049	24.40%	7	0.16%
1976	3,117	65.66%	1,618	34.08%	12	0.25%
1980	3,709	71.01%	1,212	23.21%	302	5.78%
1984	4,019	76.51%	1,175	22.37%	59	1.12%
1988	3,258	68.16%	1,469	30.73%	53	1.11%
1992	2,216	46.54%	1,216	25.54%	1,330	27.93%
1996	2,821	58.30%	1,438	29.72%	580	11.99%
2000	3,720	75.64%	1,004	20.41%	194	3.94%
2004	4,232	80.11%	960	18.17%	91	1.72%
2008	4,045	76.18%	1,108	20.87%	157	2.96%
2012	4,285	80.48%	868	16.30%	171	3.21%
2016	4,067	76.49%	604	11.36%	646	12.15%
2020	4,806	83.55%	788	13.70%	158	2.75%
2024	4,867	84.86%	742	12.94%	126	2.20%

== Education ==
Big Horn County has four public school districts, Big Horn County School Districts 1-4:

- Big Horn County School District 1
- Big Horn County School District 2
- Big Horn County School District 3
- Big Horn County School District 4

== Communities ==
=== Towns ===
- Basin (county seat)
- Burlington
- Byron
- Cowley
- Deaver
- Frannie (partly in Park County)
- Greybull
- Lovell
- Manderson

=== Census-designated places ===
- Hyattville
- Shell

=== Unincorporated communities ===
- Emblem
- Kane
- Otto
- Meadow Lark Lake
- Reeves Corner

== See also ==
- National Register of Historic Places listings in Big Horn County, Wyoming
- Wyoming
  - List of cities and towns in Wyoming
  - List of counties in Wyoming
  - Wyoming statistical areas
