= List of high schools in Wyoming =

This is a list of high schools in the state of Wyoming.

== Albany County ==
- Rock River High School, Rock River

=== Laramie ===
- Laramie High School
- Whiting High School

== Big Horn County ==
- Burlington High School, Burlington
- Greybull High School, Greybull
- Lovell High School, Lovell
- Riverside High School, Basin
- Rocky Mountain High School, Cowley

== Campbell County ==
- Wright Junior & Senior High School, Wright

=== Gillette ===
- Campbell County High School
- Heritage Christian School
- Thunder Basin High School
- Westwood High School

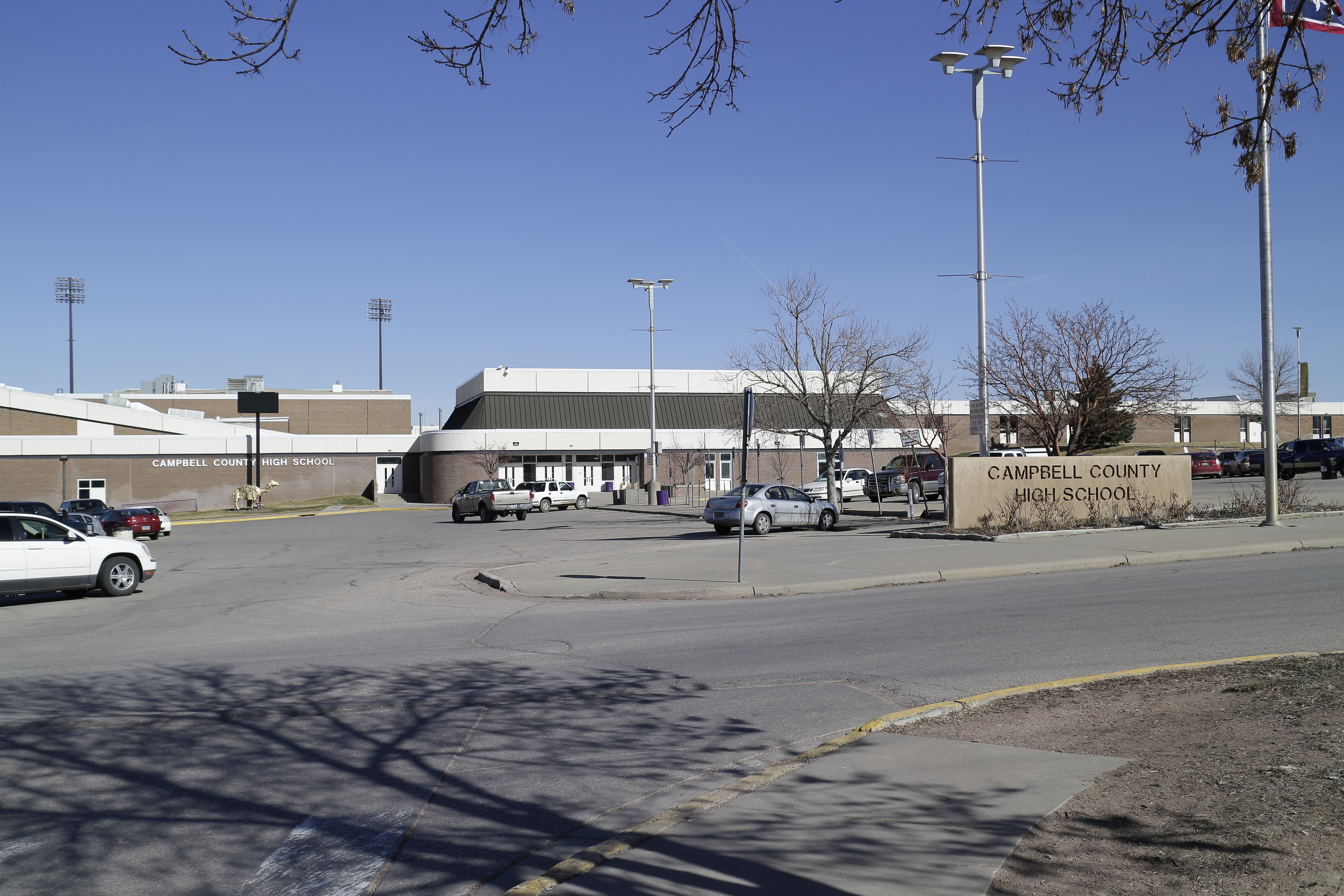
Campbell County High School in Gillette

== Carbon County ==
- Encampment K-12 School, Encampment
- H.E.M. Junior/Senior High School, Hanna
- Little Snake River Valley K-12 School, Baggs
- Rawlins High School, Rawlins
- Saratoga Middle/High School, Saratoga

== Converse County ==
- Douglas High School, Douglas
- Glenrock High School, Glenrock

== Crook County ==
- Hulett K-12 School, Hulett
- Moorcroft Secondary School, Moorcroft

=== Sundance ===
- Bear Lodge Alternative High School
- Sundance Secondary School

== Fremont County ==
- Arapahoe Charter High School, Arapahoe
- Dubois High School, Dubois
- Shoshoni High School, Shoshoni
- St. Stephens High School, St. Stephens
- Wind River Middle/High School, Pavillion
- Wyoming Indian High School, Ethete

=== Fort Washakie ===
- Fort Washakie Charter High School
- Wyoming e Academy of Virtual Education

=== Lander ===
- Lander Valley High School
- Pathfinder High School

=== Riverton ===
- Riverton High School
- Frontier Academy

== Goshen County ==
- Lingle-Fort Laramie K-12 School, Lingle
- Southeast K-12 School, Yoder
- Torrington High School, Torrington

== Hot Springs County ==
- Hot Springs County High School, Thermopolis

== Johnson County ==
- Buffalo High School, Buffalo
- Kaycee High School, Kaycee

== Laramie County ==
- Burns Junior/Senior High School, Burns
- Pine Bluffs Junior/Senior High School, Pine Bluffs

=== Cheyenne ===
- Cheyenne Central High School
- Cheyenne East High School
- Cheyenne South High School
- Destiny Christian Academy

== Lincoln County ==
- Cokeville High School, Cokeville

=== Afton ===
- Star Valley High School
- Swift Creek High School

=== Kemmerer ===
- Kemmerer High School
- New Frontier High School

== Natrona County ==
- Midwest High School, Midwest

=== Casper ===
- Natrona County High School
- Roosevelt High School
- Kelly Walsh High School

== Niobrara County ==
- Niobrara County High School, Lusk

== Park County ==
- Powell High School, Powell
- Meeteetse K-12 School, Meeteetse

=== Cody ===
- Cody High School
- Park Christian Schools

== Platte County ==
- Chugwater K-12 School, Chugwater
- Glendo K-12 School, Glendo
- Guernsey-Sunrise Junior/Senior High School, Guernsey
- Wheatland High School, Wheatland

== Sheridan County ==
- Arvada-Clearmont High School, Clearmont
- Big Horn Middle/High School, Big Horn
- Tongue River High School, Dayton

=== Sheridan ===
- Fort Mackenzie High School
- Sheridan High School

== Sublette County ==
- Big Piney High School, Big Piney
- Pinedale High School, Pinedale

== Sweetwater County ==
- Farson-Eden K-12 School, Farson

=== Green River ===
- Expedition Academy High School
- Green River High School

=== Rock Springs ===
- Independence High School
- Rock Springs High School

== Teton County ==
=== Jackson ===
- Jackson Hole Christian Academy
- Jackson Hole Classical Academy
- Jackson Hole Community School
- Jackson Hole High School
- Summit High School (formerly Western Wyoming High School)

== Uinta County ==
- Lyman High School, Lyman
- Mountain View High School, Mountain View

=== Evanston ===
- Evanston High School
- Horizon Alternative High School

== Washakie County ==
- Ten Sleep K-12 School, Ten Sleep
- Worland High School, Worland

== Weston County ==
- Newcastle High School, Newcastle
- Upton High School, Upton

Rocky Mt. High School in Byron

== See also ==
- List of school districts in Wyoming
