= List of school districts in Wyoming =

The following is a complete list of school districts in the State of Wyoming.

School districts in Wyoming are counted as independent governments by the U.S. Census Bureau. Wyoming has Elementary school districts and Unified school districts as types of K-12 school districts, along with community college districts. Wyoming has no school systems dependent on other layers of government.

== A ==
- Albany County School District #1 – Laramie

== B ==
- Big Horn County School District #1 – Cowley
- Big Horn County School District #2 – Lovell
- Big Horn County School District #3 – Greybull
- Big Horn County School District #4 – Basin

== C ==
- Campbell County School District #1 – Gillette
- Carbon County School District #1 – Rawlins
- Carbon County School District #2 – Saratoga
- Converse County School District #1 – Douglas
- Converse County School District #2 – Glenrock
- Crook County School District #1 – Sundance

== F ==
- Fremont County School District #1 – Lander
- Fremont County School District #2 – Dubois
- Fremont County School District #6 – Pavillion
- Fremont County School District #14 – Ethete
- Fremont County School District #21 – Fort Washakie
- Fremont County School District #24 – Shoshoni
- Fremont County School District #25 – Riverton
- Fremont County School District #38 – Arapahoe

== G ==
- Goshen County School District #1 – Torrington

== H ==
- Hot Springs County School District #1 – Thermopolis

== J ==
- Johnson County School District #1 – Buffalo

== L ==
- Laramie County School District #1 – Cheyenne
- Laramie County School District #2 – Pine Bluffs
- Lincoln County School District #1 – Kemmerer
- Lincoln County School District #2 – Afton

== N ==
- Natrona County School District #1 – Casper
- Niobrara County School District #1 – Lusk

== P ==
- Park County School District #1 – Powell
- Park County School District #6 – Cody
- Park County School District #16 – Meeteetse
- Platte County School District #1 – Wheatland
- Platte County School District #2 – Guernsey

== S ==
- Sheridan County School District #1 – Ranchester
- Sheridan County School District #2 – Sheridan
- Sheridan County School District #3 – Clearmont
- Sublette County School District #1 – Pinedale
- Sublette County School District #9 – Big Piney
- Sweetwater County School District #1 – Rock Springs
- Sweetwater County School District #2 – Green River

== T ==
- Teton County School District #1 – Jackson

== U ==
- Uinta County School District #1 – Evanston
- Uinta County School District #4 – Mountain View
- Uinta County School District #6 – Lyman

== W ==
- Washakie County School District #1 – Worland
- Washakie County School District #2 – Ten Sleep
- Weston County School District #1 – Newcastle
- Weston County School District #7 – Upton

== See also ==
- List of high schools in Wyoming
- Wyoming Department of Education
