= KDWY =

Radio station in Diamondville, Wyoming

- Diamondville, Wyoming; United States
- Broadcast area: Southwestern Wyoming
- Frequency: 105.3 MHz
- Branding: The Diamond

Programming
- Format: Country music
- Affiliations: Cumulus Media

Ownership
- Owner: Dan and Kim Dockstader; (SVI Media, LLC)
- Sister stations: KMER, KRSV, KRSV-FM, KVSI

History
- First air date: April 23, 1997

Technical information
- Licensing authority: FCC
- Facility ID: 77947
- Class: C2
- ERP: 16,000 watts
- HAAT: 270 meters (890 ft)
- Transmitter coordinates: 41°50′18″N 110°30′14″W

Links
- Public license information: Public file; LMS
- Website: svinews.com

KDWY (105.3 FM) is a commercial radio station licensed to Diamondville, Wyoming. It primarily broadcasts a country music format, but occasionally broadcasts local high school football and basketball games from Kemmerer or Diamondville as well. KDWY has sister stations, KMER, KVSI, KRSV-FM, and KRSV. The transmitter is located northeast of downtown Kemmerer on Quealy Peak.

== History ==
The station began as a construction permit on April 23, 1997. The initial construction permit expired, and was modified several times. The station received a license to cover on December 22, 2000. The station was owned by Jerrold T. Lundquist, of Chaparral Broadcasting.

Lundquist (Chaparral Broadcasting) sold the station for $2 million to Simmons Media, based out of Salt Lake City on April 19, 2004. At that time, KDWY's sister stations were KAOX 107.3, and KMER in Kemmerer.

The station was put in a trust in 2010 owned by Larry Patrick and operated by Broadway Media. Simmons kept KAOX and KMER. The station was sold for $15,000 to current owners SVI Media in mid 2018. KMER was also sold for $40,000.

SVI Media noted that at the time of sale, both KDWY and KMER were off air. Most of the broadcasting equipment at the studio was "archaic" and needed to be upgraded. The station returned to air with a soft opening, before fully returning to air with newer equipment. The current owners also stated they would add local high school football broadcasts at a later date.

With the sale, KDWY began to simulcast KRSV, and KMER. KDWY was known as "105.3 The Spur".

== Signal ==
KDWY broadcasts from a tower located northeast of Kemmerer, and with its 16,000 watt signal, covers much of southwestern Wyoming. KDWY can also be heard in parts of northern Utah and southeastern Idaho, with a good radio, or a car stereo. The station at one point had a construction permit to move to Oakley, Utah, changing frequencies to 105.5 FM. It would have then become a rimshot to the Salt Lake City market. The tower would move to Humpy Peak in Utah. Ultimately, the frequency move and construction permit went unbuilt.
