= KRSV =

KRSV may refer to:

- KRSV (AM), a radio station (1210 AM) licensed to Afton, Wyoming, United States
- KRSV-FM, a radio station (98.7 FM) licensed to Afton, Wyoming, United States
