= KMER =

Radio station in Kemmerer, Wyoming

- Kemmerer, Wyoming; United States
- Broadcast area: Kemmerer
- Frequency: 940 kHz
- Branding: The Spur

Programming
- Format: Country
- Affiliations: Westwood One

Ownership
- Owner: Dan and Kim Dockstader; (Star Valley Media LLC dba SVI Media LLC)
- Sister stations: KDWY, KRSV, KRSV-FM, KVSI

History
- First air date: April 30, 1963
- Call sign meaning: Kemmerer

Technical information
- Licensing authority: FCC
- Facility ID: 10335
- Class: D
- Power: 240 watts (day); 150 watts (night)
- Transmitter coordinates: 41°47′58″N 110°32′44″W
- Translator: 92.5 K223DD (Kemmerer)

Links
- Public license information: Public file; LMS

KMER (940 AM) is a radio station licensed to Kemmerer, Wyoming, United States. It primarily broadcasts a country format, but occasionally broadcasts local high school football and basketball games from Kemmerer as well. KMER has national news at the top of the hour and weather during commercial breaks. KMER has a sister station KDWY 105.3 FM, which is licensed to Diamondville.

== History ==
KMER began broadcasting in April 1963 on 950 kHz. The station was owned by Lincoln Broadcasting Company, and had a power of 1,000 watts. The transmitter was located near US Highway 30. The studios were located at 436 Fossil Butte Drive in Kemmerer. Five years later in 1968, the station applied to increase power to 5,000 watts. Until 2006, KMER was a daytimer, signing off at local sunset to protect other stations on the frequency. The station was sold to Big Wyoming Broadcasting Corporation in 1979.

KMER's primary coverage area is southwestern Wyoming, including Evanston, Green River, and Rock Springs. During its time on 950, the station was an affiliate of the Denver Broncos. KMER was also once an affiliate of the Colorado Rockies baseball team.

The station went through a number of different owners in the 1990s.

In the 1990s, the station carried a country format.

In 2004, owner Chaparral Broadcasting sold the station and its sister KDWY to Utah-based Simmons Media.

=== Move to 940 ===
In 2006, in order to accommodate nearby KOVO AM 960's move from Provo, Utah to Bluffdale, Utah (which ultimately did not happen), KMER was forced to change its frequency from 950 to 940 and lower its power so as to not interfere with KOVO. Both stations were at the time owned by Simmons Media. KOVO did relocate their towers, however it is unclear if the frequency change was necessary. KMER is listed as broadcasting in AM Stereo, or at least did broadcast in stereo.

Simmons' stations were purchased by Broadway Media, also a Utah-based radio operator, in 2014. Sister station KAOX, was included in the sale.

KMER was an oldies station throughout the 2000s until it was purchased by Star Valley Media in 2018. Following the sale, the station became a simulcast of KRSV in Afton, Wyoming, carrying a country music format. SVI Media noted that at the time of sale, both KMER and sister KDWY were off air. Most of the broadcasting equipment at the studio was "archaic" and needed to be upgraded. The stations returned to air with a soft opening, before fully returning to air with newer equipment. The current owners also stated they would add local high school football broadcasts at a later date.
