= 2024 Wyoming local elections =

- November 5, 2024
- Mayoral elections

18 mayors
- Cities (red) and towns (blue) with mayoral elections

Mayoral and city council elections were held throughout Wyoming's towns and cities on November 5, 2024. As of 2022, there are 99 municipalities throughout the state, of which 19 are cities. Under Wyoming law, each town and city has one mayor and four councilors, all elected.

== Mayoral elections ==
=== Casper ===
A council-manager government, the mayor of Casper is elected by the city council every January. Steve Cathey was unanimously elected mayor on January 2, 2024.

=== Cheyenne ===
2024 Cheyenne, Wyoming mayoral election
- November 5, 2024 (general); August 20, 2024 (primary)
Candidate	Patrick Collins	Rick Coppinger	Jenny Hixenbaugh
General	14,992; 58.23%	10,417; 40.46%	Eliminated
Primary	6,290; 56.97%	2,788; 25.25%	974; 8.82%
- Results by precinct Collins: 40–50% 50–60% 60–70% 70–80% Coppinger: 50–60%
Mayor before election
Patrick Collins
Elected mayor
Patrick Collins

In Cheyenne, Patrick Collins was re-elected mayor by a comfortable margin. The primary election received some attention due to the candidacy of libertarian Victor Miller, who pledged to make many of the city's decisions via an AI chatbot based on ChatGPT called VIC. Initially, VIC was to be listed on the ballot, but Wyoming Secretary of State Chuck Gray ordered Miller's name to be placed instead, calling the chatbot's candidacy "unprecedented and very disturbing."

==== Primary election ====
Cheyenne, Wyoming mayoral primary election
Party	Candidate	Votes	%
Nonpartisan	Patrick Collins (inc.)	6,290	56.97
Nonpartisan	Rick Coppinger	2,788	25.25
Nonpartisan	Jenny Hixenbaugh	974	8.82
Nonpartisan	Victor Miller	327	2.96
Nonpartisan	Buddy Tennant	292	2.65
Nonpartisan	Justin Nadeau	288	2.61
Write-in		82	0.74
Valid ballots		11,041	96.29
Invalid or blank votes		425	3.71
Total votes		11,466	100.00

==== General election ====
Cheyenne, Wyoming mayoral general election
Party	Candidate	Votes	%
Nonpartisan	Patrick Collins (inc.)	14,992	58.23
Nonpartisan	Rick Coppinger	10,417	40.46
Write-in		339	1.32
Valid ballots		25,748	93.99
Invalid or blank votes		1,645	6.01
Total votes		27,393	100.00

=== Cody ===
==== Primary election ====
Cody, Wyoming mayoral primary election
Party	Candidate	Votes	%
Nonpartisan	Lee Ann Reiter	2,064	74.32
Nonpartisan	Chuck Struemke	696	25.06
Write-in		17	0.61
Valid ballots		2,777	95.07
Invalid or blank votes		144	4.93
Total votes		2,921	100.00

==== General election ====
Cody, Wyoming mayoral general election
Party	Candidate	Votes	%
Nonpartisan	Lee Ann Reiter	3,540	73.22
Nonpartisan	Chuck Struemke	1,228	25.40
Write-in		67	1.39
Valid ballots		4,835	89.87
Invalid or blank votes		545	10.13
Total votes		5,380	100.00

=== Douglas ===
==== Primary election ====
Douglas, Wyoming mayoral primary election
Party	Candidate	Votes	%
Nonpartisan	Kim Pexton (inc.)	1,093	92.71
Write-in		86	7.29
Valid ballots		1,179	85.14
Invalid or blank votes		175	14.84
Total votes		1,354	100.00

==== General election ====
Douglas, Wyoming mayoral general election
Party	Candidate	Votes	%
Nonpartisan	Kim Pexton (inc.)	1,304	50.56
Nonpartisan	Tony Reynolds	1,249	48.43
Write-in		26	1.01
Valid ballots		2,579	93.27
Invalid or blank votes		186	6.73
Total votes		2,765	100.00

=== Kemmerer ===
==== Primary election ====
Kemmerer, Wyoming mayoral primary election
Party	Candidate	Votes	%
Nonpartisan	Robert Bowen	507	81.64
Write-in		114	18.36
Total votes		685	100.00

==== General election ====
Kemmerer, Wyoming mayoral general election
Party	Candidate	Votes	%
Nonpartisan	Robert Bowen	781	65.03
Nonpartisan	Rachelle Points	411	34.22
Write-in		9	0.75
Valid ballots		1,201	96.78
Invalid or blank votes		40	3.22
Total votes		1,241	100.00

=== Newcastle ===
==== Primary election ====
Newcastle, Wyoming mayoral primary election
Party	Candidate	Votes	%
Nonpartisan	Tyrel Owens	403	51.34
Nonpartisan	Pam Gualtieri (inc.)	306	38.98
Nonpartisan	Ed Kiesling	71	9.05
Write-in		5	0.64
Valid ballots		785	98.87
Invalid or blank votes		9	1.13
Total votes		794	100.00

==== General election ====
Newcastle, Wyoming mayoral general election
Party	Candidate	Votes	%
Nonpartisan	Tyrel Owens	743	55.91
Nonpartisan	Pam Gualtieri (inc.)	574	43.19
Write-in		12	0.90
Valid ballots		1,329	97.56
Invalid or blank votes		33	2.42
Total votes		1,363	100.00

=== Powell ===
==== Primary election ====
Powell, Wyoming mayoral primary election
Party	Candidate	Votes	%
Nonpartisan	John Wetzel (inc.)	700	55.47
Nonpartisan	Kate Richmond	551	43.66
Write-in		11	0.87
Valid ballots		1,262	96.78
Invalid or blank votes		42	3.22
Total votes		1,304	100.00

==== General election ====
Powell, Wyoming mayoral general election
Party	Candidate	Votes	%
Nonpartisan	John Wetzel (inc.)	1,333	52.15
Nonpartisan	Kate Richmond	1,210	47.34
Write-in		13	0.51
Valid ballots		2,556	92.37
Invalid or blank votes		195	7.63
Total votes		2,751	100.00

=== Sheridan ===
==== Primary election ====
Sheridan, Wyoming mayoral primary election
Party	Candidate	Votes	%
Nonpartisan	Richard Bridger (inc.)	2,701	72.28
Nonpartisan	Matthew Hamilton	952	25.48
Write-in		84	2.25
Total votes		3,737	100.00

==== General election ====
Sheridan, Wyoming mayoral general election
Party	Candidate	Votes	%
Nonpartisan	Richard Bridger (inc.)	5,495	70.40
Nonpartisan	Matthew Hamilton	2,117	27.12
Write-in		194	2.49
Valid ballots		7,806	86.83
Invalid or blank votes		1,184	13.17
Total votes		8,990	100.00

=== Worland ===
==== Primary election ====
Worland, Wyoming mayoral primary election
Party	Candidate	Votes	%
Nonpartisan	Rebecca George	535	41.09
Nonpartisan	Jim Gill (inc.)	402	30.88
Nonpartisan	Bruce Nolting	362	27.80
Write-in		3	2.25
Valid ballots		1,302	98.86
Invalid or blank votes		15	1.14
Total votes		1,317	100.00

==== General election ====
Worland, Wyoming mayoral general election
Party	Candidate	Votes	%
Nonpartisan	Rebecca George	1,373	63.80
Nonpartisan	Jim Gill (inc.)	764	35.50
Write-in		15	0.70
Valid ballots		2,152	94.84
Invalid or blank votes		117	5.16
Total votes		2,269	100.00

=== Town mayors ===
Town	County	Incumbent mayor	Elected mayor
Bear River	Uinta	Vernon Condie	Clyde Kofoed
Chugwater	Platte	Carol Ash	Joshua Hopkins
Cokeville	Lincoln	Colby Peck	Colby Peck
Evansville	Natrona	Candace Machado	Candace Machado
Greybull	Big Horn	Myles Foley	Myles Foley
Jackson	Teton	Hailey Morton Levinson	Arne Jorgensen
Hanna	Carbon	Orville "Oats" Briggs	Charlie George
Medicine Bow	Carbon	Justin George	Justin George
Mountain View	Uinta	Bryan Ayres	Bryan Ayres
Pine Bluffs	Laramie	Justin Fornstrom	Justin Fornstrom
