= Wyoming e Academy of Virtual Education =

Coordinates: 42°59′58″N 108°51′20″W

Information
- Type: Rural public high school
- Grades: 9–12
- Website: www.fwsweave.com

The Wyoming e Academy of Virtual Education, or WeAVE is an online high school in the western region of the United States, operating out of Fort Washakie, Wyoming. It is part of the Fort Washakie Charter High School (FWCHS), which was formed in 2002 to bring a secondary school to one of two remaining K-8 districts in the state.

== Background ==
Fort Washakie Charter High School was supported financially and programmatically by the local school board, unlike most charter schools. After investigating some of the nation’s premiere online high schools, they created WeAVE.

The process to create WeAVE was complicated by having to get a charter from the Wyoming State Legislature, which was a new concept in that state, and became an issue in the 2010 campaign for state superintendent of public instruction.

== Curriculum ==
The Charter School offers both face-to-face education and online instruction. All teachers at the school are rated "highly qualified Wyoming teacher". The Wyoming Department of Education, headed by the elected State Superintendent of Public Instruction, has named it a "school of choice". The North Central Accreditation (NCA) and the Commission on International and Trans-Regional Accreditation (CITA) accredit the school.

The online part of the charter school is WeAVE. It offers both traditional and non-traditional classes leading to a high school diploma. The online school used E-College for its software platform. In 2011, the school adopted Genius SIS and a program from Pearson.

WeAVE is only one of three accredited charter schools in Wyoming. It is also the only such school operated by a Native American-majority school district.

Students must complete homework and other assignments and submit them to a "drop box" email system. Each class is essentially independent study. Students spend about 30–40 hours on line each week on classwork. The admissions process is "rigorous".

== Outcomes ==
A study by the International Association for K-12 Online Education highlighted the success of WeAVE in "emphasiz[ing] the need for ongoing communication and support from teachers, learning coaches, counselors, tutors, and special education coordinators." An advantage that WeAVE has for student outcomes is that, if a student drops out, he or she can start again without waiting for a new semester or academic year. The study also noted shortcomings; a major challenge for their students is that they need to be highly motivated to finish their work.

The Center for Public Education cited the online school in a special report. This case study was cited in turn by the University of Minnesota's Center for Rural Policy and Development. The report noted that most students had academic difficulties before entering, they all came from the same Wind River Indian Reservation, they had to go through a rigorous admissions process, and they all received IEPs.

== See also ==
- University of Wyoming
- List of high schools in Wyoming
