= KRSV (AM) =

- Afton, Wyoming; United States
- Frequency: 1210 kHz
- Branding: The Spur

Programming
- Format: Country
- Affiliations: Westwood One

Ownership
- Owner: Dan and Kim Dockstader; (SVI Media, LLC)
- Sister stations: KRSV-FM, KDWY, KMER

History
- First air date: May 5, 1986

Technical information
- Licensing authority: FCC
- Facility ID: 72020
- Class: B
- Power: 5,000 watts (day); 250 watts (night)
- Transmitter coordinates: 42°43′22″N 110°57′39″W
- Translator: 107.5 K298CX (Afton)

Links
- Public license information: Public file; LMS
- Webcast: Listen live
- Website: svinews.com

KRSV (1210 AM) is a radio station broadcasting a country music format, licensed to Afton, Wyoming, United States. The station is currently owned by Dan and Kim Dockstader, through licensee SVI Media, LLC.

The station is simulcast on KMER 940 kHz in Kemmerer and KDWY 105.3 in Diamondville. KRSV had long simulcast on KRSV-FM, until it became known as "The Spur" under current owners SVI Media LLC.

== History ==
The station began as a construction permit in September 1983, but would not go on air until May 5, 1986, after the construction permit was extended multiple times. It was owned by Western Wyoming Radio Inc.

The station and its sister were sold to local resident David Horsely in 2008. The stations and the now active translator for KRSV were sold again in 2015 to the current owners, SVI Media, LLC. The station is an affiliate of the Wyoming Cowboys and Cowgirls from the University of Wyoming.

KRSV and its FM sister are a part of a larger network owned by SVI Media LLC. The network expended in 2018 to include a station and its translators across the border from Afton in Montpelier, Idaho. That station is KVSI. KMER 940 in Kemmerer, and KDWY in Diamondville, were included in the expansion.

KRSV and KRSV-FM had long carried a country format, before the FM counterpart became adult contemporary known as Swift 98.7.
