= List of high school boys basketball streaks by state =

This is a list of the longest High School boys' basketball winning streaks, regardless of division, by state.

State	School	City	Streak	Seasons	Notes
Alabama	Tuscaloosa Academy	Tuscaloosa, Alabama	100	1980-1983	A.G Parrish in Selma also won 88 consecutive games from 1943 to 1947
Alaska					
Arizona	Pima High School	Pima, Arizona	75	1969-1973	
Arkansas	West Memphis High School	West Memphis, Arkansas	60	1980-1981	Stephens High School also won 60 consecutive games from 1998 to 1999
California	Compton High School	Compton, California	66	1966–1968	
Colorado	Sanford High School	Sanford, Colorado	74	2014–2017	
Connecticut	Middletown High School	Middletown, Connecticut	80	1975-1978	
Delaware					
Florida	Greensboro High School	Greensboro, Florida	76	1968–1972	
Georgia	Georgia Christian	Valdosta, Georgia	129	1979–1984	
Hawaii	Saint Louis High School	Honolulu	85	1966–1968	
Idaho	Lapwai High School	Lapwai, Idaho	82	1987–1989	
Illinois	Lawrenceville High School	Lawrenceville, Illinois	68	1981-1983	
Indiana	Lawrence North High School	Indianapolis, Indiana	50	2005-2006	Team led by future NBA players Mike Conley and Greg Oden.
Iowa	Palmer High School	Palmer, Iowa	103	1986–1989	
Kansas	St. John High School	St. John, Kansas	63	2013-2015	
Kentucky	Ashland Blazer High School	Ashland, Kentucky	44	1927-1928	
Louisiana	Sibley High School	Sibley, Louisiana	100	1978-1980	
Maine	Bingham Valley High School	Bingham, Maine	101	1997–2002	
Maryland	Dunbar High School	Baltimore, Maryland	59	1981-1983	
Massachusetts	Durfee High School	Fall River, Massachusetts	56	1988-1991	
Michigan	Powers North Central High School	Powers, Michigan	84	2014–2017	
Minnesota	Edina High School	Edina, Minnesota	69	1965–1968	
Mississippi	Simmons High School	Hollandale, Mississippi	80	1992-1994	
Missouri	Bradleyville High School	Bradleyville, Missouri	68	1966-1968	
Montana	Sentinel High School	Missoula, Montana	56	1962–1965	
Nebraska	Wahoo High School	Wahoo, Nebraska	114	1988–1992	
Nevada	Virginia City High School	Virginia City, Nevada	93	1982-1986	
New Hampshire	Manchester Central High School	Manchester, New Hampshire	46	2004-2006	
New Jersey	Passaic High School	Passaic, New Jersey	159	1919–1925	All Time US Record - Went 200–1 between 1915 and 1924
New Mexico	Hobbs High School	Hobbs, New Mexico	53	1965-1967	
New York	Union Academy of Belleville	Belleville, New York	104	1966–1971	
North Carolina	Beaufort High School	Beaufort, North Carolina	91	1960–1962	
North Dakota	Alsen High School	Alsen, North Dakota	79	1956–1959	Smallest town on list, just 114 in Alsen people at time of win streak
Ohio	Middletown High School	Middletown, Ohio	76	1955–1958	
Oklahoma	Byng High School	Byng, Oklahoma	67	1957-1959	
Oregon	Oakland High School	Oakland, Oregon	56	1999-2001	
Pennsylvania	Our Lady of the Sacred Heart (OLSH)	Moon Township, Pennsylvania	74	2020-2022	
Rhode Island	Central High School	Providence, Rhode Island	52	1968-1970	
South Carolina	Calhoun County High School	St. Matthews, South Carolina	81	2005-2008	
South Dakota	Armour High School	Armour, South Dakota	64	1978–1980	
Tennessee	Riverside High School	Chattanooga, Tennessee	66	1967-1969	
Texas	Snook High School	Snook, Texas	90	1964–1966	
Utah	Provo High School	Provo, Utah	54	1972-1974	
Vermont	Rutland High School	Rutland, Vermont	43	2016-2018	
Virginia	Staunton-Lee High School	Staunton, Virginia	85	2003–2006	
Washington	Brewster High School	Brewster, Washington	82	1974–1977	
West Virginia	Charleston High School	Charleston, West Virginia	48	1967-1969	Ansted High School also won 48 consecutive games from 1958 to 1959
Wisconsin	Randolph School	Randolph, Wisconsin	69	2001–2005	
Wyoming	Wyoming Indian High School	Ethete, Wyoming	50	1983–1985	
Wyoming	Pine Bluffs High School	Pine Bluffs, Wyoming	50	2016–2017	
