= Riverton High School =

Riverton High School may refer to several high schools in the United States:

- Riverton High School (Kansas), Riverton, Kansas
- Riverton High School (Wyoming), Riverton, Wyoming
- Riverton High School (Illinois), Riverton, Illinois
- Riverton High School (Utah), Riverton, Utah
- Riverton Parke Junior-Senior High School, Montezuma, Indiana
