= Otto Franc =

Count Otto Franc von Lichtenstein (1846–November 30, 1903) was a cattle baron, sheriff and judge in the Big Horn Basin region of the U.S. state of Wyoming. Franc was born in Germany as a member of the German nobility. He emigrated to the United States in 1866. After visiting the Big Horn Basin area on a hunting trip in 1877–1878 with Texas Jack Omohundro, he returned the following year and established the Pitchfork Ranch on the upper Greybull River, near the present-day town of Meeteetse. Over the next few decades, he became a powerful cattle baron, homesteader and political figure in the area.

In 1893, Franc had renowned outlaw Butch Cassidy and his friend Al Hainer arrested for stealing three horses. The two asserted they had bought them legally, though legal paperwork was never presented. Cassidy was convicted and Hainer acquitted, possibly because he had made a deal with Franc to sell out his friend. Cassidy was pardoned by governor William A. Richards in 1896, but the time he spent in the Wyoming State Penitentiary convinced him to become a full-time outlaw, and he formed the Wild Bunch shortly after his release.

Franc was suspected to be an active member of the Wyoming Stock Growers Association, and is believed to have bankrolled part of the Johnson County War, a conflict between small cattle owners and large wealthy cattle outfits in 1892.

Franc died from a gunshot on November 30, 1903, under still mysterious circumstances. Local newspapers reported that his double-barrel shotgun accidentally discharged while Franc was crawling under a fence on his property. The Pitchfork Ranch remains active and is known for its wildlife conservation efforts. In 1981, a colony of black-footed ferrets, an animal previously thought to be extinct, was discovered on the ranch.

== Namesakes ==
- Otto, Wyoming – A small Wyoming community along the Greybull River
- Francs Peak – The highest point in the Absaroka Range
