= St. Michael's Mission =

St. Michael's Mission may refer to:

- St. Michael's Mission (Window Rock, Arizona), listed on the National Register of Historic Places in Apache County, Arizona
- St. Michael's Mission (Conesus, New York)
- St. Michael's Mission (Ethete, Wyoming), listed on the National Register of Historic Places in Fremont County, Wyoming
- St. Michael's Mission (Montreal), a charity that assists the homeless population of Montreal
- St. Michael's Mission (Natal, South Africa)
