= Fremont County School District Number 14 =

Public school district in Wyoming, United States

Fremont County School District #14 is a public school district based in Ethete, Wyoming, United States.

== Geography ==
Fremont County School District #14 is located in central Fremont County and serves the following communities:

- Census-designated places (Note: All census-designated places are unincorporated.)
  - Boulder Flats (most)
  - Ethete (most)

== Schools ==
- Wyoming Indian High School (Grades 9–12)
- Wyoming Indian Middle School (Grades 6–8)
- Wyoming Indian Elementary School (Grades PK-5)

== Student demographics ==
The following figures are as of October 1, 2009.

- Total District Enrollment: 536
- Student enrollment by gender
  - Male: 278 (51.87%)
  - Female: 258 (48.13%)
- Student enrollment by ethnicity
  - American Indian or Alaska Native: 534 (99.63%)
  - Hispanic or Latino: 1 (0.19%)
  - White: 1 (0.19%)

== See also ==
- List of school districts in Wyoming
