= Hill View Heights, Wyoming =

- CDP
- Location in Weston County and the state of Wyoming
- Coordinates: 43°48′57″N 104°09′06″W
- Country: United States
- State: Wyoming
- County: Weston

Area
  - Total: 2.2 sq mi (5.7 km^{2})
  - Land: 2.2 sq mi (5.7 km^{2})
  - Water: 0 sq mi (0.0 km^{2})
- Elevation: 4,344 ft (1,324 m)

Population (2020)
  - Total: 144
  - Density: 65/sq mi (25/km^{2})
- Time zone: UTC-7 (Mountain (MST))
  - Summer (DST): UTC-6 (MDT)
- Area code: 307
- FIPS code: 56-37727
- GNIS feature ID: 2408389

Hill View Heights is a census-designated place (CDP) in Weston County, Wyoming, United States. The population was 144 at the 2020 census.

== Geography ==
According to the United States Census Bureau, the CDP has a total area of 2.2 square miles (5.7 km^{2}), all land.

== Demographics ==
As of the census of 2000, there were 166 people, 57 households, and 49 families residing in the CDP. The population density was 75.2 people per square mile (29.0/km^{2}). There were 61 housing units at an average density of 27.6/sq mi (10.7/km^{2}). The racial makeup of the CDP was 97.59% White, and 2.41% from two or more races. Hispanic or Latino of any race were 0.60% of the population.

There were 57 households, out of which 38.6% had children under the age of 18 living with them, 75.4% were married couples living together, 7.0% had a female householder with no husband present, and 14.0% were non-families. 14.0% of all households were made up of individuals, and 8.8% had someone living alone who was 65 years of age or older. The average household size was 2.91 and the average family size was 3.16.

In the CDP, the population was spread out, with 30.1% under the age of 18, 6.0% from 18 to 24, 30.1% from 25 to 44, 22.3% from 45 to 64, and 11.4% who were 65 years of age or older. The median age was 40 years. For every 100 females, there were 95.3 males. For every 100 females age 18 and over, there were 93.3 males.

The median income for a household in the CDP was $50,469, and the median income for a family was $52,031. Males had a median income of $41,875 versus $31,750 for females. The per capita income for the CDP was $24,424. About 13.0% of families and 8.7% of the population were below the poverty line, including none of those under the age of eighteen or sixty five or over.

== Education ==
Public education in the community of Hill View Heights is provided by Weston County School District #1.
