= Greybull River =

River in Big Horn and Park counties in Wyoming, United States

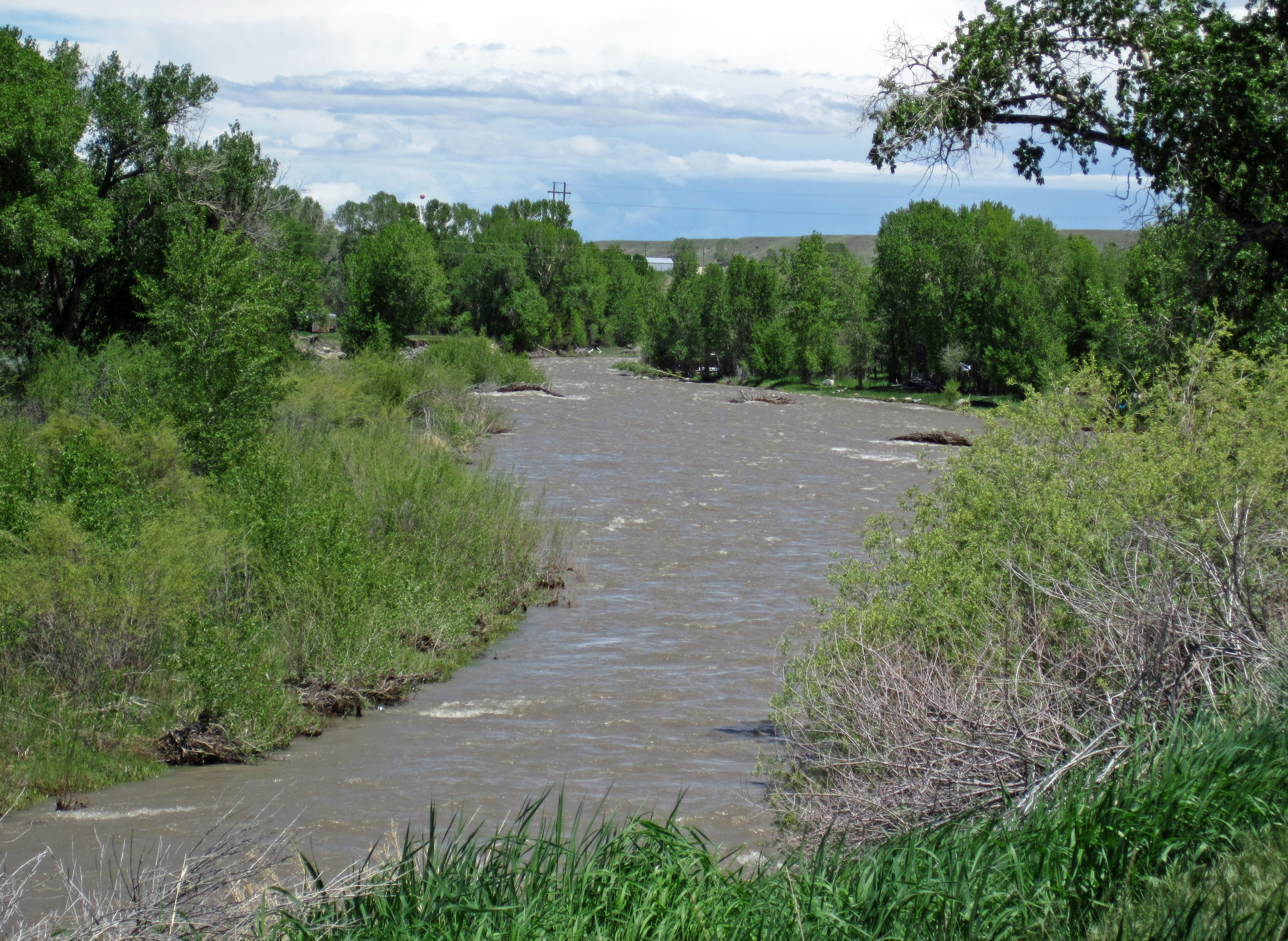
- Etymology: Where the mountain lion sits
- Native name: Iisbíialawache (Crow)

Location
- Country: United States
- State: Wyoming
- Cities: Meeteetse, Greybull

Physical characteristics
- Source: Absaroka Range
  - location: Big Horn Basin, Wyoming
  - coordinates: 43°52′48″N 109°20′33″W
- Mouth: Big Horn River
  - location: Greybull, Wyoming
  - coordinates: 44°28′15″N 108°02′59″W
- Length: 90 mi (140 km)

Basin features
- Tributaries
  - right: Wood River

The Greybull River is a tributary of the Big Horn River, approximately 90 miles (140 km) long in Big Horn and Park counties in Wyoming, United States.

== Description ==
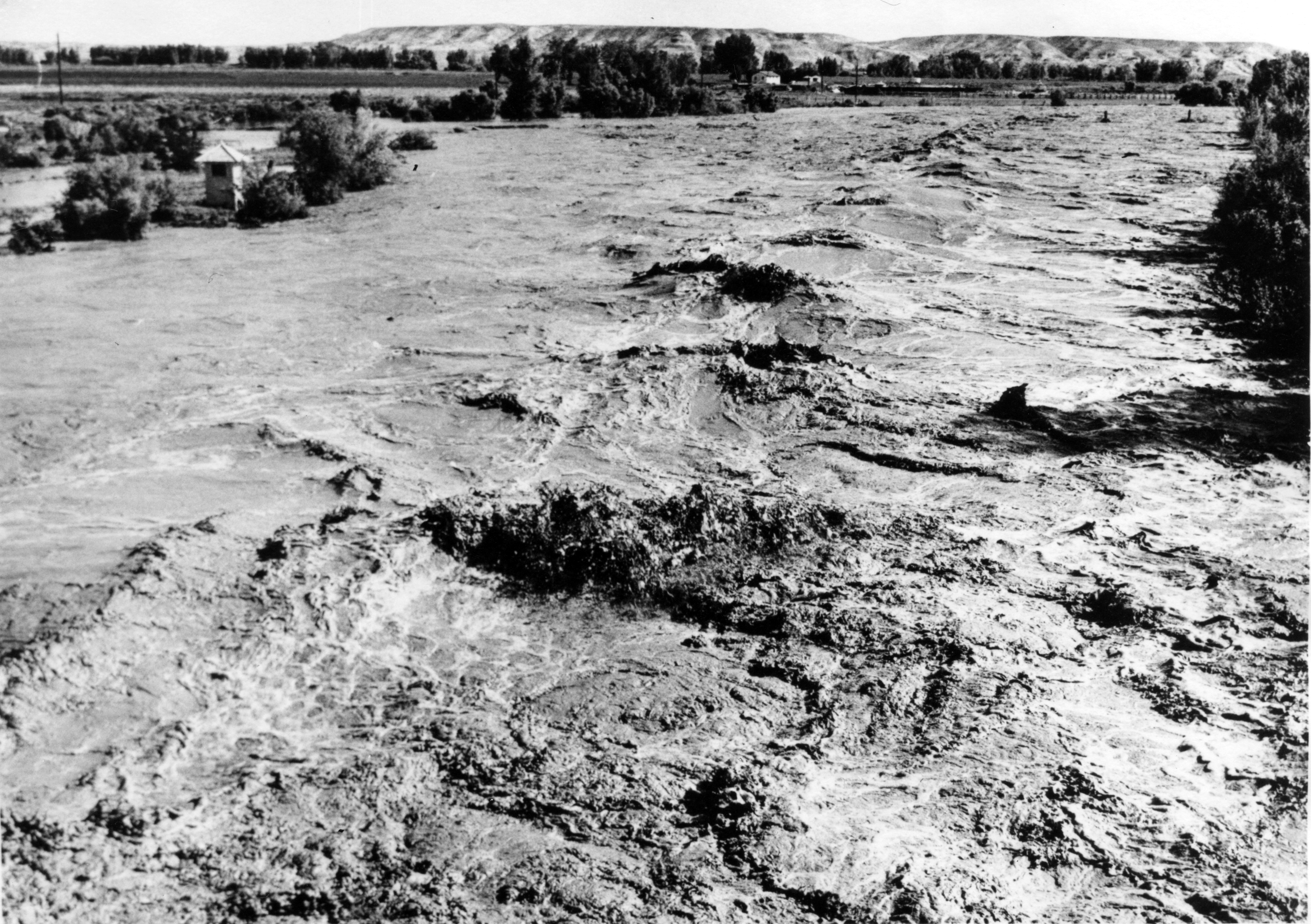
Flooding of Greybull River near Basin, Wyoming in June 1963, where the peak flow was 19,400 cubic feet per second (550 m^{3}/s).

The river was reportedly named for a white buffalo that had been seen on its banks. Native Americans consider the appearance of a white buffalo a powerful omen.

The river rises near Francs Peak in the Absaroka Range in the southwest corner of the Big Horn Basin. It joins with the Wood River and leaves the mountains near the town of Meeteetse, continuing through the southern parts of Park County and Big Horn County before flowing into the Big Horn River near Greybull. Much of the upper river is considered a top trout stream, hosting the best genetically pure populations of Yellowstone cutthroat trout in the region. In 1981, a colony of black-footed ferrets was discovered on the Pitchfork Ranch near Meeteetse. The animal had previously been thought to be extinct.

== See also ==
- List of rivers of Wyoming
