= Wyoming Indian High School =

Location
- 638 Blue Sky Highway; Ethete, Wyoming; United States; 43°01′30″N 108°46′21″W

Information
- Type: Public
- School district: Fremont County School District No. 14
- NCES School ID: 560445000441
- Principal: Pam Gambler
- Faculty: 21.38 (on FTE basis)
- Grades: 9 to 12
- Enrollment: 196 (2021–22)
- Student to teacher ratio: 9.17
- Colors: Blue; White; Red
- Nickname: Chiefs

Wyoming Indian High School is located in Ethete, Wyoming, United States on the Wind River Reservation. It is part of Fremont County School District#14.

== Athletics ==
Wyoming Indian High School plays basketball in the Class 2A Southwest. The school has won twelve state titles, including in 1984, 1985, 1989, 1991, 1993, 2001, 2009, 2010, 2012, 2014, 2019, 2020, and 2024.

The school set a state record with 50 consecutive victories from 1983 to 1985, under basketball coach Alfred Redman.

The Wyoming Indian Lady Chiefs have won 5 basketball state titles, including 2003, 2004, 2019, 2020 and 2021.

The boys cross country teams have won twenty Class 2A state championships, including eight consecutive.

== Documentary ==
Daniel Junge directed the 2002 film entitled Chiefs, which won the best documentary award at the Tribeca Film Festival. It chronicles the school's 2000 and 2001 basketball seasons, providing a view into the lives of players on the Wind River Reservation, both on and off the court, while they try to reach the state championship final and face different challenges.
