= Kemmerer High School =

Public high school in Kemmerer, Wyoming, United States

Coordinates: 41°47′10″N 110°32′39″W

Kemmerer Junior-Senior High School

Location
- 1525 Third West Avenue; Kemmerer, (Lincoln County), Wyoming 83116; United States

Information
- Type: Public high school
- Principal: Shawn Rogers
- Staff: 19.27 (FTE)
- Enrollment: 269 (2023-2024)
- Student to teacher ratio: 13.96
- Colors: Red and black
- Nickname: Rangers
- Website: www.rangers1.net/kjshs-home

Kemmerer Junior Senior High School is a high school in rural Kemmerer, Lincoln County, Wyoming, United States. It is the only high school in its school district, Lincoln County School District Number 1. Kemmerer, Cokeville High School, and Star Valley High School are the only high schools in Lincoln County

The high school has a number of athletic teams and activities. The school's wrestling program won their first state wrestling title in 2021.

In academics, the school ranks (8 out of 10).

== Notable alumni ==
- Edgar Herschler (1918–1990), Governor of Wyoming

== See also ==
- List of high schools in Wyoming
- Education in Lincoln County
