= Charles Belden =

American photographer and rancher

Charles Josiah Belden (November 16, 1887, San Francisco, California – February 1, 1966, St. Petersburg, Florida) was a photographer and rancher who was famous for his visceral photographs of the area around Meetseetse, Wyoming.

Belden was born in San Francisco into a wealthy California family. His grandfather, Josiah Belden, was an early California pioneer who made millions in San Francisco real estate and was the first Mayor of San Jose. After graduating from Massachusetts Institute of Technology, Charles Belden bought his first camera to record a European tour with his school friend, Eugene Phelps. The highlight of the tour was a journey through Russia in Belden's 1908 Packard, the first automobile to make such a trip in the country. After the trip, Belden went to work as a cowboy on the Phelps (Pitchfork) Ranch in Wyoming. In 1912, Belden married Eugene's sister, Frances. The couple had three children, Annice, Margot, and Mary Elizabeth, who died while still a toddler. Eugene's father died in 1922, leaving Eugene and Charles to take over management of the Pitchfork Ranch. Belden's 1921–1940 photographs of the Pitchfork Ranch were widely published, including in The Saturday Evening Post, National Geographic, and on the cover of Life magazine.

Airplanes became a fascination for Belden. In the late 1920s, Charles became involved in raising antelope and sending them by airplane to zoos around the world, including some to Germany in the Hindenburg. He helped to pioneer the process of planting fish from the air and filmed the experience for future reference. In addition, he helped the Wyoming Game and Fish Commission conduct a census of wildlife herd populations using aerial photographs.

Estate taxes, mismanagement, and an agricultural depression that began in 1921 took their toll on the Pitchfork and the ranch fell into decline. To meet expenses, in the 1930s the family turned their home into a dude ranch, but this response did not stop the financial drain. After many years of strained relations, Charles divorced Frances in 1940 and moved to Florida with a new wife, Verna Steele Belden. Charles Belden died in 1966 of a self-inflicted gunshot wound in St. Petersburg, Florida.
