= Nancy F. Peternal =

Wyoming politician

Member of the Wyoming House of Representatives

Nancy F. Peternal is an American Democratic politician from Kemmerer, Wyoming. She represented the Lincoln district in the Wyoming House of Representatives from 1970 to 1972 and 1974 to 1976.
