= KVSI =

Coordinates: 42°19′2″N 111°19′20″W

- Montpelier, Idaho; United States
- Broadcast area: Montpelier, Idaho; Garden City, Idaho; Paris, Idaho
- Frequency: 1450 (kHz)
- Branding: The Wave

Programming
- Format: Adult contemporary

Ownership
- Owner: Dan Dockstader; (SVI Media, LLC)
- Sister stations: KRSV, KRSV-FM, KMER, KDWY

History
- First air date: October 8, 1965

Technical information
- Licensing authority: FCC
- Facility ID: 67811
- Class: C
- Power: 1,000 watts
- Translator: (104.5 MHz) K283CX (Montpelier) (101.7 MHz) K269FQ (Montpelier)

Links
- Public license information: Public file; LMS
- Website: svinews.com

KVSI is a commercial radio station in Montpelier, Idaho, broadcasting to the Montpelier, Idaho-Paris, Idaho area on 1450 AM. The station carries an adult contemporary format, and is owned by SVI Media, LLC. The primary control point is in Afton, Wyoming, along with sister stations KRSV, KRSV-FM, KDWY, and KMER.

== History ==
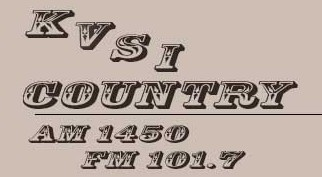
The former logo before KVSI was sold in 2018, indicating the station was carrying country music

KVSI signed on the air October 8, 1965. The station was owned by Tri-State Broadcasting, with a transmitter 1 mile (2 km) west of Montpelier. Initially, the station broadcast with 250 watts during the day, and 1,000 watts at night. It primarily carried a country music format. The station became an affiliate of ABC Radio in the 1970s.

In 2018, the station was sold to current owners SVI Media, LLC for $200,000. The sale included the two FM translators already on air at that point. Initially, the station carried an oldies format, but new owners SVI Media conducted a survey of residents in the Montpelier region, asking them what format they would like to see on the station. Ultimately, it was decided that KVSI would carry an updated adult contemporary mix of music. KVSI also began to carry local high school football games, as well as Utah State University college football and basketball games.

KVSI signed on a second translator on 104.5 MHz in 2021 to improve coverage of the station.

== Translator ==
KVSI programming can also be heard on 101.7 and 104.5 MHz via FM translators; this provides improved sound and better coverage than AM alone.

Call sign	Frequency	City of license	FID	ERP (W)	HAAT	Class	FCC info
K269FQ	101.7 FM	Montpelier, Idaho	146563	250	9 m (30 ft)	D	LMS
K283CX	104.5 FM	Montpelier, Idaho	203219	250	8 m (26 ft)	D	LMS

== Annual events ==
Since 1978, KVSI has sponsored a Fun-Run that kicks off the Paris, Idaho July 4 celebration. Runners and walkers leave the KVSI station and finish in Paris, Idaho (8.6 miles).
