= Star Valley High School =

Coordinates: 42°44′19″N 110°56′42″W

Location
- 445 Swift Creek Lane; Afton, Wyoming; United States

Information
- Type: Public, general
- Oversight: Board of Trustees, Lincoln County School District Number 2
- Principal: Jason Horsley
- Faculty: 53
- Grades: 9–12
- Enrollment: 883 (2023-2024)
- Colors: Crimson and gold
- Mascot: Brave
- Accreditation: National Blue Ribbon School (2012)
- Website: Star Valley High School

Star Valley High School is a high school located in rural Afton, Lincoln County, Wyoming, United States. It is one of three high schools in Lincoln County School District Number 2, along with Cokeville High School, and Swift Creek High School. It is one of four high schools, along with Cokeville High School, Swift Creek High school, and Kemmerer High School, in Lincoln County.

Principal Shannon Harris was named 2009 Wyoming High School Principal of the Year.

At the beginning of the 2012–2013 school year, Star Valley High School was a recipient of the National Blue Ribbon School of Excellence award from the National Department of Education.

The school was expected to average 188 students per grade through the 2010–2011 school year. The student population is 46.8% female and 53.2% male, with 97.14% Caucasian students and 1.5% Hispanic. 20.4% of the students receive free or reduced lunch. Despite the relative poverty of its students, it is ranked high in academics (9 out of 10).

Star Valley competes in classes 3A and 4A in Wyoming high school athletics.

== Notable alumni ==
- Rulon Gardner, Olympic gold medalist in Greco-Roman wrestling

== See also ==
- List of high schools in Wyoming
- Education in Lincoln County
