= National School Boards Association =

American educational organization

NSBA
- National School Boards Association
- Founded: 1940
- Headquarters: Alexandria, Virginia
- Location: United States
- President: Devin Sheehan
- Key people: Verjeana McCotter-Jacobs , Executive Director & CEO
- Website: www.nsba.org

The National School Boards Association (NSBA) is a nonprofit educational organization operating as a federation of state associations of school boards across the United States. Founded in 1940, NSBA represents state school boards associations and their more than 90,000 local school board members. It argues that education is a civil right and that public education is America's most vital institution. During the first years of the organization, it was expected that members would serve on state boards of education for several years. However, the average term of service turned to four years in the late 1980s and the 1990s. The organization's concentration shifted to enhancing the professional development of board members, training in policy development, and information dissemination.

The length of time that individuals served on the boards of education changed, and the organization also reformed into a focus of policy development of state education. In the early 21st century, the National Association of State Boards of Education reflected the work of state boards, the diverse views, and the influence of legislatures and governors on the policymaking process. That turned the organization into not only board members but also educational leaders. Someone who is not a state board education member can still be a part of the organization including state school boards associations and that of the Virgin Islands, a U.S. territory.

The organization relies on the following views:

- Public education is essential.
- Public education must address the needs of all students.
- Public education is the most fundamental obligation of state government.
- Citizen governance is essential in making public education an enterprise that fulfills its purpose.
- Citizens who serve in positions of governance over public education must do so without conflict of interest.
- Every state board member has national level roles and responsibilities.
- Differences among and between states should be recognized and considered when addressing education policy.

== Services and programs ==
- Center for Public Education
- State Association Services – NSBA offers training and resources to State School Board Associations and their executive directors.
- National Connection – A partnership of state school boards associations and NSBA, National Connection provides nationally developed tools and resources for school boards.
- Council of School Attorneys (COSA) – COSA provides information and practical legal assistance to more than 3,000 attorneys representing K-12 public school districts and state school boards associations.
- Council of Urban Boards of Education (CUBE) – CUBE supports urban school boards, fosters effective school district leadership, and addresses the education challenges that exist in US urban centers.
- Federal Policy Coordinators Network – This network provides members with the latest information and lobbying support on federal education policy.
- Federal Relations Network (FRN) – FRN is NSBA's core grassroots network. It provides the opportunity for school board members to engage with their members of Congress.
- National Black Council (NBC) of School Board Members – NBC promotes equitable education access and opportunities for African-American children through national dialogue on education problems, issues, and concerns in conjunction with NSBA and other national organizations.
- National Hispanic Council (NHC) of School Board Members – NHC works to promote and advance equal educational opportunities for Hispanic children by Council members becoming actively engaged in national dialogue on educational problems, issues and concerns in conjunction with NSBA and other national organizations.
- National Caucus of American Indian/Alaska Native (AIAN) School Board Members – AIAN serves in an advisory capacity to the NSBA in matters affecting NSBA's policy and program issues. It works to promote quality education for all students with emphasis on the problems and success of the American Indian/Alaska Native student.
- Technology Leadership Network (TLN) – TLN, founded in 1987, examines the intersection of policy and practice and provides school boards, administrators, and district technology teams with resources and experiences to help them make well-informed technology decisions.
- NSBAConnect – NSBAConnect is a networking and discussion tool for members to learn more about NSBA's activities and the work of other school board members.

== Patriot Act letter ==
On September 29, 2021, the NSBA published a letter they sent to the White House which complained of threats made to school board members and inquired whether these threats could be investigated under the PATRIOT Act. The letter said "As these acts of malice, violence, and threats against public school officials have increased, the classification of these heinous actions could be the equivalent to a form of domestic terrorism and hate crimes". In response, Merrick Garland stated that the FBI would utilize the law enforcement response to what Garland called "a disturbing spike in harassment, intimidation, and threats of violence against school administrators, board members, teachers, and staff." Parents who had attended school board meetings because they were concerned about whether critical race theory was being taught to their children felt this letter compared them to terrorists. A father who was arrested at a school board meeting after becoming angered at the school board's denial that his daughter was sexually assaulted at Stone Bridge High School demanded an apology for being called a terrorist.

After the letter was sent and published, 26 state school boards distanced themselves from the NSBA.

On October 22, the NSBA renounced the letter, apologized to the parents, and eventually deleted it from its website. Despite this, Attorney General Merrick Garland declined to disband a task force he had assembled to tag and track parents perceived as threats. The attorney for the father of the Stone Bridge sexual assault victim said the apology was only to fellow NSBA members, not the parents, and called for a direct apology.

On November 11, it was discovered that the NSBA had coordinated with the White House and the Department of Justice when composing the letter.

As of February 16, 2022, 29 states—Alabama, Arizona, Arkansas, Delaware, Florida, Georgia, Idaho, Illinois, Indiana, Iowa, Kentucky, Louisiana, Minnesota, Mississippi, Missouri, Montana, Nebraska, New Hampshire, New Jersey, North Carolina, North Dakota, Ohio, Pennsylvania, South Carolina, Tennessee, Texas, Virginia, West Virginia, Wisconsin and Wyoming—have opposed or distanced themselves from the letter and 20 states have withdrawn membership or dues from the NSBA or announced plans to do so.

According to an analysis of official documents by Axios, these states' affiliations accounted for more than 40% of the NSBA funding by states in 2019, which would amount to losses of $1.1 million annually.
