= KAOX =

- Shelley, Idaho; United States
- Broadcast area: Shelley-Rexburg-Rigby-Blackfoot-Idaho Falls
- Frequency: 107.9 MHz (HD Radio)
- Branding: NewsTalk 107.9

Programming
- Format: Talk radio
- Subchannels: HD2: Conservative talk "News Talk 2"
- Affiliations: Fox News Radio; Compass Media Networks; Premiere Networks; Salem Radio Network; Westwood One

Ownership
- Owner: Sandhill Media Group; (Frandsen Media Company, LLC)

History
- First air date: 1995
- Former frequencies: 107.3 MHz (1999–2016)

Technical information
- Licensing authority: FCC
- Facility ID: 31169
- Class: C1
- ERP: 32,000 watts
- HAAT: 139 meters (456 ft)
- Transmitter coordinates: 43°21′6″N 112°0′29″W
- Translator: HD2: 105.1 K286BU (Idaho Falls)

Links
- Public license information: Public file; LMS
- Webcast: Listen Live; Listen Live (HD2)
- Website: newstalk1079.com newstalk1079.com/newstalk-2/ (HD2)

KAOX (107.9 FM) is a commercial radio station licensed to Shelley, Idaho, United States. Carrying a talk radio format as "NewsTalk 107.9", the station is owned by Sandhill Media Group.

== History ==
KAOX received a construction permit on 107.3 from Kemmerer, Wyoming on November 8, 1995. It was owned by Jimmy Ray Carroll. After an extension of the construction permit, the station received a license to cover on December 22, 2000. On September 21, 2021, the station was sold again to Chaparral Broadcasting, joining KMER. The station was sold in 2004 to Simmons Media, a Salt Lake City based radio group. In 2014, Simmons transferred their properties to Broadway Media, including KAOX.

The station was known as "The X" and covered much of southwestern Wyoming. The identification mentioned the cities of Evanston, Rock Springs, and Green River.

In 2016, in order to complete frequency changes as a result of a shuffle of stations in Salt Lake City, Broadway took KAOX off 107.3, and moved the station to Shelley, Idaho, near Idaho Falls. The station was silent for a period of time with the allotment of 107.9. Broadway sold KAOX to Frandsen Media for $25,000. Frandsen Media's Sandhill Media Group brought the station back on air with a news/talk format.

== HD Radio ==
On October 30, 2026, KAOX-HD2 changed their format from contemporary hit radio to conservative talk, branded as "News Talk 2".
