= Boulder Flats, Wyoming =

- Census-designated place
- Location within Wyoming Location within the United States
- Coordinates: 42°54′12″N 108°46′37″W
- Country: United States
- State: Wyoming
- County: Fremont

Area
  - Total: 18.2 sq mi (47.2 km^{2})
  - Land: 18.2 sq mi (47.2 km^{2})
  - Water: 0 sq mi (0.0 km^{2})
- Elevation: 5,587 ft (1,703 m)

Population (2010)
  - Total: 408
  - Density: 22.4/sq mi (8.64/km^{2})
- Time zone: UTC-7 (Mountain (MST))
  - Summer (DST): UTC-6 (MDT)
- Area code: 307
- FIPS code: 56-09307
- GNIS feature ID: 2407893

Boulder Flats is a census-designated place (CDP) in Fremont County, Wyoming, United States. The population was 408 at the 2010 census.

== Geography ==
According to the United States Census Bureau, the CDP has a total area of 18.2 square miles (47.2 km^{2}), all land.

== Demographics ==
As of the census of 2000, there were 381 people, 122 households, and 93 families residing in the CDP. The population density was 20.9 people per square mile (8.1/km^{2}). There were 127 housing units at an average density of 7.0/sq mi (2.7/km^{2}). The racial makeup of the CDP was 32.55% White, 0.26% African American, 63.25% Native American, 0.79% from other races, and 3.15% from two or more races. Hispanic or Latino of any race were 2.36% of the population.

There were 122 households, out of which 35.2% had children under the age of 18 living with them, 49.2% were married couples living together, 22.1% had a female householder with no husband present, and 23.0% were non-families. 18.9% of all households were made up of individuals, and 4.1% had someone living alone who was 65 years of age or older. The average household size was 3.12 and the average family size was 3.59.

In the CDP, the population was spread out, with 35.7% under the age of 18, 9.7% from 18 to 24, 25.5% from 25 to 44, 23.6% from 45 to 64, and 5.5% who were 65 years of age or older. The median age was 28 years. For every 100 females, there were 83.2 males. For every 100 females age 18 and over, there were 82.8 males.

The median income for a household in the CDP was $33,542, and the median income for a family was $34,519. Males had a median income of $24,375 versus $23,125 for females. The per capita income for the CDP was $13,888. About 18.3% of families and 23.0% of the population were below the poverty line, including 22.3% of those under age 18 and 35.0% of those age 65 or over.

== Education ==
The majority of Boulder Flats is served by Fremont County School District #14. A very small portion of the CDP is located within the boundaries of Fremont County School District #21.
