= Tuscaloosa Academy =

Segregation academy in Alabama

Location
- 33.2451°N 87.5397°W

Information
- Type: Private
- Established: September 1967
- NCES School ID: 00001558
- Head of school: Beckie Share
- Faculty: 56
- Enrollment: 438 (2016)
- Colors: Navy Blue, Bright Gold, and White
- Website: tuscaloosaacademy.org

Tuscaloosa Academy (TA) is a private school in Tuscaloosa, Alabama. It has been described as a segregation academy.

== History ==
The school opened with grades one through seven in September 1967, the year Alabama public schools were forced to desegregate. In 1973, the first graduation exercises were held. In a 1979 interview, headmaster William Garrison denied that it was founded as a segregation academy, as did all other private schools in Tuscaloosa, and said the school was "actively recruiting for blacks". However, in 2021, Headmaster Bryan Oliver gave an interview acknowledging that the school was indeed founded as a segregation academy.

It was initially housed in the Northington Army Hospital, in proximity to the University Mall, and had 113 students. The property was state-owned, which stimulated protest by opponents.

== Athletics ==
In 2021, the school announced that after more than 40 years, it would leave the Alabama Independent School Association, an organization originally founded to support athletics among segregation academies, and instead would compete in the integrated Alabama High School Athletic Association in the 2022–2023 school year.

From fall 1980 to December 1983, TA won 100 basketball games in a row, making it one of the longest basketball win streaks in American high school history.

== Demographics ==
In 2016, the school enrolled twelve black students (3%), in a community that is 47% black.
