= Laramie High School (Wyoming) =

Public high school in Laramie, Wyoming, USA

Location
- 1710 Boulder Dr. Laramie, Wyoming; United States; 41°18′7.488″N 105°32′54.744″W

Information
- Type: Public school
- School district: Albany County School District #1
- Principal: Fred George
- Faculty: 65
- Teaching staff: 72.70 (FTE)
- Grades: 9–12
- Enrollment: 1,111 (2023-2024)
- Student to teacher ratio: 15.28
- Colors: Maroon and white
- Mascot: Plainsman
- Website: www.acsd1.org/o/lhs
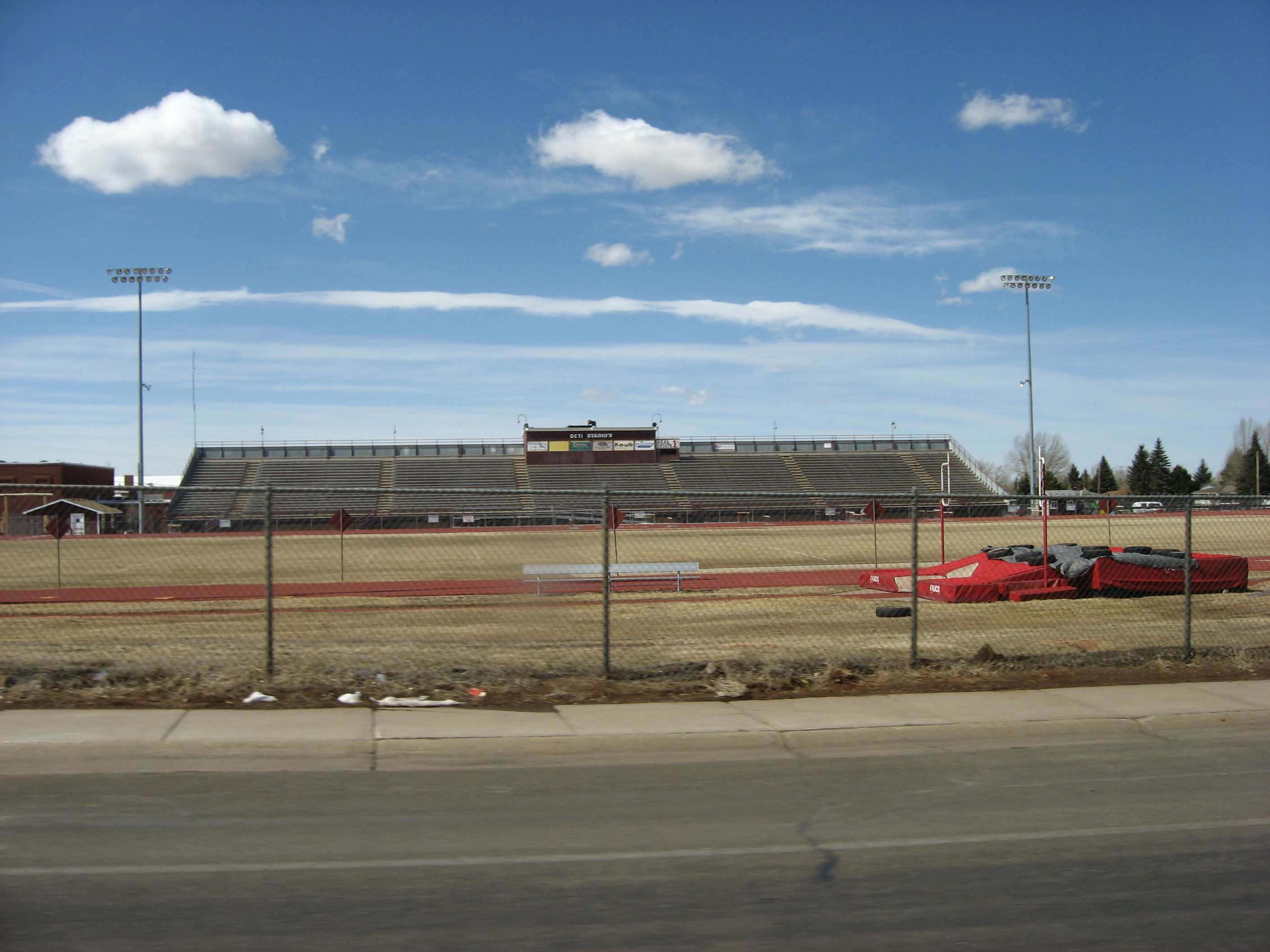
- Deti Stadium, the sports stadium for the school

Laramie High School (LHS) is a high school (grades 9–12) in Laramie, Albany County, Wyoming, United States. In the Albany County School District, high school begins in the 9th grade (freshman year); 9th grade students are now able to attend high school in Laramie due to the building of a new high school. Many LHS students concurrently attend classes at Laramie County Community College (Albany County Campus), or the University of Wyoming.

Laramie High School has an online newspaper, the CyberPlainsman.

As of the opening of the new building in the 2015–2016 school year, Laramie High School has the highest elevation in the state, at 7280 ft.

== Sports ==
The LHS mascot is the Plainsman (female counterpart: Lady Plainsman).

The Laramie High School football team was coached for 59 years by John E. Deti (1944-1976) and his son John R. Deti (1977-2002). Following the younger Deti's retirement, the team has been coached by Phil Treick (2003-2004), Neil Waring (2005-2007), Bob Knapton (2008-2011), Ted Holmstrom (2012), Chuck Syverson (2013-2016), Clint Reed (2017-2020), and Paul Ronga (2021-present).

== Notable alumni ==
- John S. Bugas - former FBI agent credited with breaking up two Nazi spy rings and deterring sabotage; former director of industrial relations at Ford Motor Company
- Frank Crum - NFL offensive lineman for the Denver Broncos
- Wayde Preston - actor
- Ken Sailors - basketball player for the Wyoming Cowboys and in the NBA, pioneer of the jump shot
- Gerry Spence - trial lawyer, author, and television legal consultant
- Kim Barker - Journalist, Chicago Tribune, New York Times, ProPublica
- David Kahne - Record producer, musician, and former major music exec

== See also ==
- List of high schools in Wyoming
