= Fremont County School District Number 21 =

School district in Wyoming, United States

Fremont County School District #21 is a public school district based in Fort Washakie, Wyoming, United States.

== Geography ==
Fremont County School District #21 is located in west central Fremont County and serves the following communities:

- Census-designated places (Note: All census-designated places are unincorporated.)
  - Boulder Flats (very small portion)
  - Ethete (very small portion)
  - Fort Washakie
  - Johnstown (partial)

== Schools ==
(Note: All schools are located on a single-campus.)

- Fort Washakie Charter High School (Grades 9–12)
- Fort Washakie Middle School (Grades 7–8)
- Fort Washakie Elementary School (Grades PK-6)

== Student demographics ==
The following figures are as of October 1, 2009.

- Total District Enrollment: 474
- Student enrollment by gender
  - Male: 247 (52.11%)
  - Female: 227 (47.89%)
- Student enrollment by ethnicity
  - American Indian or Alaska Native: 448 (94.51%)
  - Black or African American: 1 (0.21%)
  - Hispanic or Latino: 14 (2.95%)
  - Two or More Races: 7 (1.48%)
  - White: 4 (0.84%)

== See also ==
- List of school districts in Wyoming
