= Uinta County School District Number 1 =

School district in Wyoming, United States

Uinta County School District #1 is a public school district based in Evanston, Wyoming, United States.

== Geography ==
Uinta County School District #1 serves the western portion of Uinta County, including the following communities:

- Incorporated places
  - Town of Bear River
  - City of Evanston

== Schools ==
=== High schools ===
- Grades 9-12
  - Evanston High School
- Grades 7-12
  - Horizon Junior/Senior High School (Alternative)

=== Middle schools ===
- Grades 6-8
  - Davis Middle School
  - Evanston Middle School

=== Elementary schools ===
- Grades K-5
  - Aspen Elementary School
  - Clark Elementary School
  - North Evanston Elementary School
  - Uinta Meadows Elementary School

== Student demographics ==
The following figures are as of October 1, 2008.

- Total District Enrollment: 2,973
- Student enrollment by gender
  - Male: 1,553 (52.24%)
  - Female: 1,420 (47.76%)
- Student enrollment by ethnicity
  - White (not Hispanic): 2,517 (84.66%)
  - Hispanic: 380 (12.78%)
  - Asian or Pacific Islander: 35 (1.18%)
  - American Indian or Alaskan Native: 24 (0.81%)
  - Black (not Hispanic): 17 (0.57%)

== See also ==
- List of school districts in Wyoming
