= Francs Peak =

Mountain in Wyoming, United States

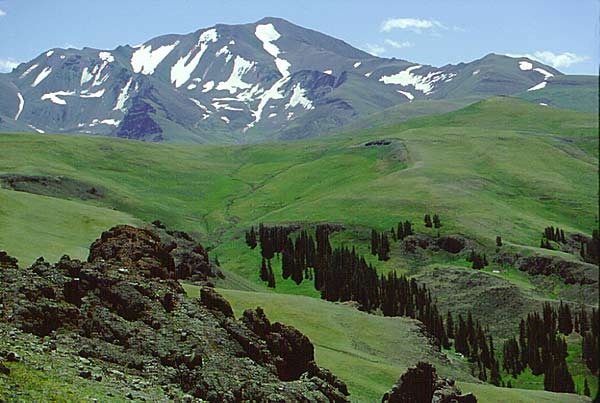
- Francs Peak from Haymaker Pass

Highest point
- Elevation: 13,158 ft (4,011 m)
- Prominence: 4,056 ft (1,236 m)
- Listing: North America highest peaks 120th; US highest major peaks 100th
- Coordinates: 43°57′41″N 109°19′51″W

Geography
- Location within Wyoming Location within the United States
- Location: Park County, Wyoming, U.S.
- Parent range: Absaroka Range
- Topo map: USGS Francs Peak

Climbing
- Easiest route: Hike

Francs Peak, elevation 13,158 feet (4,011 m), is the highest point in the Absaroka Range which extends from north-central Wyoming into south-central Montana, in the United States. It is in the Washakie Wilderness of Shoshone National Forest, and the peak is also the highest point in Park County, Wyoming, which includes much of Yellowstone National Park. It was named after Otto Franc, a cattle baron and homesteader in the Big Horn Basin in the latter half of the 19th century.

== Climate ==
Climate data for Francs Peak 43.9586 N, 109.3331 W, Elevation: 12,671 ft (3,862 m) (1991–2020 normals)
Month	Jan	Feb	Mar	Apr	May	Jun	Jul	Aug	Sep	Oct	Nov	Dec	Year
Mean daily maximum °F (°C)	17.5 (−8.1)	16.7 (−8.5)	21.8 (−5.7)	26.7 (−2.9)	36.0 (2.2)	46.7 (8.2)	56.7 (13.7)	55.7 (13.2)	47.0 (8.3)	34.5 (1.4)	23.0 (−5.0)	16.9 (−8.4)	33.3 (0.7)
Daily mean °F (°C)	8.1 (−13.3)	6.5 (−14.2)	10.9 (−11.7)	15.4 (−9.2)	24.2 (−4.3)	34.0 (1.1)	42.8 (6.0)	42.0 (5.6)	34.1 (1.2)	23.1 (−4.9)	13.7 (−10.2)	7.7 (−13.5)	21.9 (−5.6)
Mean daily minimum °F (°C)	−1.4 (−18.6)	−3.7 (−19.8)	0.1 (−17.7)	4.1 (−15.5)	12.4 (−10.9)	21.3 (−5.9)	28.9 (−1.7)	28.2 (−2.1)	21.1 (−6.1)	11.8 (−11.2)	4.4 (−15.3)	−1.4 (−18.6)	10.5 (−12.0)
Average precipitation inches (mm)	1.84 (47)	2.11 (54)	2.35 (60)	2.93 (74)	5.26 (134)	2.42 (61)	1.70 (43)	1.68 (43)	2.19 (56)	2.03 (52)	2.02 (51)	2.32 (59)	28.85 (734)
Source: PRISM Climate Group

== See also ==
- 4000 meter peaks of North America
- Central Rocky Mountains
- Mountain peaks of North America
- Mountain peaks of the Rocky Mountains
- Mountain peaks of the United States
