= Center for Public Education =

Nonprofitable educational organization in the United States

- Formation: 2006; 19 years ago
- Headquarters: Alexandria, Virginia, U.S.
- Website: Official website

The Center for Public Education is a nonprofit educational organization in the United States. Founded in 2006 by the National School Boards Association, it serves as a resource for accurate and nonpartisan information about public education and its importance in the United States.

The Center for Public Education provides data, research, and analysis on current issues around public education and disseminates national strategies and resources to improve student learning, close achievement gaps, and increase general support for public education.
