= Weston County School District Number 1 =

School district in Wyoming, United States

Weston County School District #1 is a public school district based in Newcastle, Wyoming, United States.

== Geography ==
Weston County School District #1 serves southeastern Weston County, including the following communities:

- Incorporated places
  - City of Newcastle
- Census-designated places (Note: All census-designated places are unincorporated.)
  - Hill View Heights
  - Osage
- Unincorporated places
  - Four Corners

== Schools ==
- Newcastle High School (Grades 9–12)
- Newcastle Middle School (Grades 6–8)
- Newcastle Elementary School (shared building split into two campuses)
  - Newcastle Elementary 3-5
  - Newcastle Elementary K-2

== Student demographics ==
The following figures are as of October 1, 2019.

- Total District Enrollment: 810
- Student enrollment by gender
  - Male: 417 (51.48%)
  - Female: 393 (48.52%)
- Student enrollment by ethnicity
  - White (not Hispanic): 730 (90.12%)
  - Hispanic: 25 (3.09%)
  - American Indian or Alaskan Native: 8 (0.99%)
  - Black (not Hispanic): 3 (0.37%)
  - Asian or Pacific Islander: 9 (1.11%)
  - Two or more Races: 35 (4.32%)

== See also ==
- List of school districts in Wyoming
