= St. Michael's Mission (Ethete, Wyoming) =

- U.S. National Register of Historic Places
- U.S. Historic district
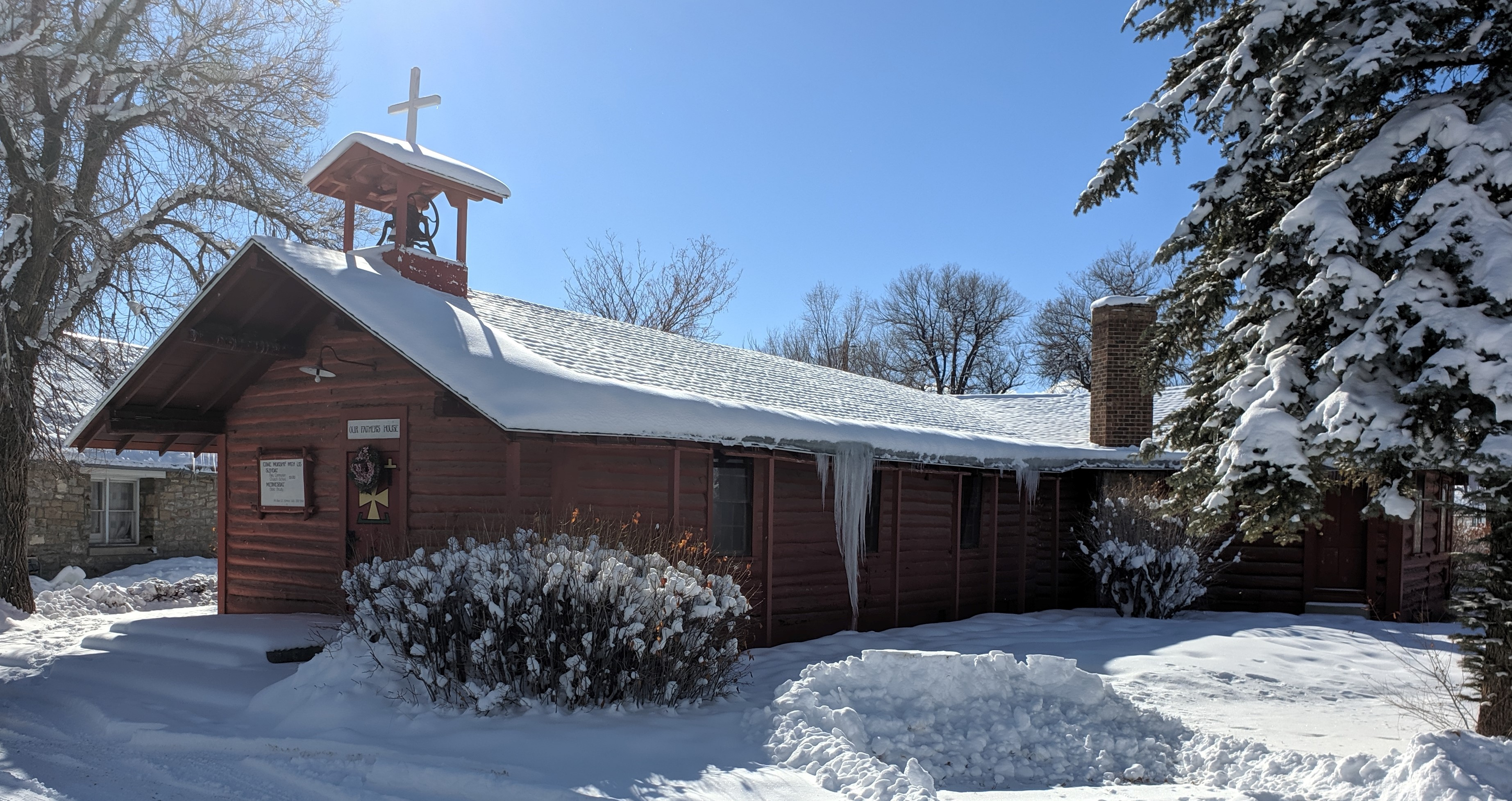

- Location within Wyoming Location within the United States
- Location: In Ethete, Ethete, Wyoming
- Coordinates: 43°1′30″N 108°46′22″W
- Area: 4 acres (1.6 ha)
- Built: 1910
- NRHP reference No.: 71000886
- Added to NRHP: June 21, 1971

St. Michael's Mission is an Episcopal church mission established about 1887 in Fremont County, Wyoming to minister to the Arapaho and Shoshone of the Wind River Indian Reservation. It was founded by Reverend John Roberts with the permission of Shoshone Chief Washakie. The community of Ethete grew around the mission, given its name by Washakie's assent in the Shoshone language, ethete ("good" or "OK"). In 1900 a small log church was built about 3 miles (4.8 km) from the present location. In 1910 the mission received an endowment from Mrs. Baird Cooper and the new site was developed over the next seven years. In 1920 the original church was moved to the mission, enlarged, and named "The Church of Our Father's House.

The buildings are arranged around an oval at the center of Ethete. The log church is accompanied by several frame buildings including a former schoolhouse, residences and a cultural center. The mission was placed on the National Register of Historic Places on June 21, 1971.
