= Weston County School District Number 7 =

School district in Wyoming, United States

Weston County School District #7 is a public school district based in Upton, Wyoming, United States.

== Geography ==
Weston County School District #7 serves the northwestern portion of Weston County. The town of Upton is the only incorporated place in the district.

== Schools ==
- Upton High School (Grades 9–12)
- Upton Middle School (Grades 6–8)
- Upton Elementary School (Grades K-5)

== Student demographics ==
The following figures are as of October 1, 2019.

- Total District Enrollment: 235
- Student enrollment by gender
  - Male: 126 (53.62%)
  - Female: 109 (46.38%)
- Student enrollment by ethnicity
  - White (not Hispanic): 216 (91.91%)
  - Hispanic: 6 (2.55%)
  - American Indian or Alaskan Native: 0 (0.00%)
  - Black (not Hispanic): 1 (0.43%)

== See also ==
- List of school districts in Wyoming
