= Bear River, Wyoming =

Town in Uinta County, Wyoming, United States

- Town
- Location of Bear River in Uinta County, Wyoming
- Coordinates: 41°22′43″N 111°01′48″W
- Country: United States
- State: Wyoming
- County: Uinta

Area
  - Total: 1.92 sq mi (4.98 km^{2})
  - Land: 1.92 sq mi (4.98 km^{2})
  - Water: 0 sq mi (0.00 km^{2})
- Elevation: 6,532 ft (1,991 m)

Population (2020)
  - Total: 522
  - Density: 263.1/sq mi (101.59/km^{2})
- Time zone: UTC-7 (Mountain (MST))
  - Summer (DST): UTC-6 (MDT)
- Area code: 307
- FIPS code: 56-05625
- GNIS feature ID: 2411670
- Website: www.bearriverwy.gov

Bear River is a town in Uinta County, Wyoming, United States, incorporated in 2001. As of the 2020 census, Bear River had a population of 522.

== Geography ==
According to the United States Census Bureau, the town has a total area of 1.90 square miles (4.92 km^{2}), all land.

== Demographics ==
=== 2010 census ===
Historical population
Census	Pop.	Note	%±
2010	518		—
2020	522		0.8%
U.S. Decennial Census

As of the census of 2010, there were 518 people, 182 households, and 147 families residing in the town. The population density was 272.6 inhabitants per square mile (105.3/km^{2}). There were 190 housing units at an average density of 100.0 per square mile (38.6/km^{2}). The racial makeup of the town was 95.8% White, 0.2% African American, 0.4% Native American, 0.2% Asian, 1.4% from other races, and 2.1% from two or more races. Hispanic or Latino of any race were 5.2% of the population.

There were 182 households, of which 42.3% had children under the age of 18 living with them, 70.9% were married couples living together, 2.7% had a female householder with no husband present, 7.1% had a male householder with no wife present, and 19.2% were non-families. 14.8% of all households were made up of individuals, and 1.6% had someone living alone who was 65 years of age or older. The average household size was 2.85 and the average family size was 3.16.

The median age in the town was 38 years. 29.7% of residents were under the age of 18; 5.7% were between the ages of 18 and 24; 24% were from 25 to 44; 36% were from 45 to 64; and 4.8% were 65 years of age or older. The gender makeup of the town was 51.2% male and 48.8% female.

== Education ==
Public education in the town of Bear River is provided by Uinta County School District #1.

== See also ==
- List of municipalities in Wyoming
