= KRSV-FM =

- Afton, Wyoming; United States
- Frequency: 98.7 MHz
- Branding: Swift 98.7

Programming
- Format: Adult contemporary
- Affiliations: SVI Media

Ownership
- Owner: Dan and Kim Dockstader; (SVI Media, Inc.)
- Sister stations: KRSV, KDWY, KMER, KVSI

History
- First air date: 1987

Technical information
- Licensing authority: FCC
- Facility ID: 72018
- Class: A
- ERP: 3,000 watts
- HAAT: -88 meters
- Transmitter coordinates: 42°51′2″N 110°58′46″W

Links
- Public license information: Public file; LMS
- Website: Swift 98.7 Online

KRSV-FM (98.7 FM) is a radio station broadcasting an adult contemporary music format. Licensed to Afton, Wyoming, United States, the station is currently owned by Dan and Kim Dockstader, through licensee SVI Media, Inc., and began broadcasting adult contemporary music on a new station in the area called Swift 98, beginning May 4, 2016. Prior to the format switch, the station was a simulcast of its AM counterpart, known as Black Mountain Country.

== History ==
The station started as a construction permit in October 1983 on 98.3 MHz, however the station would ultimately not receive its license to operate until 1987. The station was granted multiple construction permit extensions, under ownership of Western Wyoming Radio Inc. In February 2000, the station changed frequencies from 98.3 MHz to 98.7 MHz.

The station and its sister were sold to local resident David Horsely in 2008. The station was then put in a trust.

Current owners, SVI Media, LLC acquired the station in 2015. At that time, the stations were known as "Star Country USA".

Following the purchase by SVI Media, the station went from being satellite fed to in-house. Local programming was added. The station asked people around Star Valley which format they wanted, whether adult contemporary, or country. Adult contemporary was the final choice, and Swift 98.7 was born.

KRSV and its AM sister are a part of a larger network owned by SVI Media LLC. The network expanded in 2018 to include a station and its translators across the border from Afton in Montpelier, Idaho. That station is KVSI. KMER 940 in Kemmerer, and KDWY in Diamondville, were included in the expansion.

The station is an affiliate of the Wyoming Cowboys and Cowgirls from the University of Wyoming.

KRSV-FM's logo under previous AM/FM country simulcast
