= Uinta County School District Number 6 =

School district in Wyoming, United States

Uinta County School District #6 is a public school district based in Lyman, Wyoming, United States.

== Geography ==
Uinta County School District #6 serves northeastern Uinta County. The town of Lyman is the only incorporated place in the district.

== Schools ==
- Lyman High School (Grades 9–12)
- Lyman Intermediate School (Grades 5–8)
- Urie Elementary School (Grades K-4)

== Student demographics ==
The following figures are as of October 1, 2008.

- Total District Enrollment: 672
- Student enrollment by gender
  - Male: 332 (49.40%)
  - Female: 340 (50.60%)
- Student enrollment by ethnicity
  - White (not Hispanic): 634 (94.35%)
  - Hispanic: 24 (3.57%)
  - Black (not Hispanic): 6 (0.89%)
  - Asian or Pacific Islander: 5 (0.74%)
  - American Indian or Alaskan Native: 3 (0.45%)

== See also ==
- List of school districts in Wyoming
