= Park County School District Number 16 =

School district in Wyoming, United States

Park County School District #16 is a public school district based in Meeteetse, Wyoming, United States.

== Geography ==
Park County School District #16 serves the southeastern portion of Park County. The town of Meeteetse is the only incorporated place in the district.

== Schools ==
- Meeteetse School (Grades K-12)

== Student demographics ==
The following figures are as of October 1, 2009.

- Total District Enrollment: 119
- Student enrollment by gender
  - Male: 58 (48.74%)
  - Female: 61 (51.26%)
- Student enrollment by ethnicity
  - Black or African American: 1 (0.84%)
  - Hispanic or Latino: 2 (1.68%)
  - White: 116 (97.48%)

== See also ==
- List of school districts in Wyoming
