= Fremont County School District Number 2 =

School district in Wyoming, United States

Fremont County School District #2 is a public school district based in Dubois, Wyoming, United States.

== Geography ==
Fremont County School District #2 serves the far northwestern portion of Fremont County. The only incorporated town in the district is Dubois.

== Schools ==
- Dubois High School (Grades 9–12)
- Dubois Elementary/Middle School [also called Dubois K-8] (Grades K-8)

== Student demographics ==
The following figures are as of October 1, 2009.

- Total District Enrollment: 178
- Student enrollment by gender
  - Male: 92 (51.69%)
  - Female: 86 (48.31%)
- Student enrollment by ethnicity
  - American Indian or Alaska Native: 8 (4.49%)
  - Hispanic or Latino: 1 (0.56%)
  - White: 169 (94.94%)

== See also ==
- List of school districts in Wyoming
