= Washakie County School District Number 2 =

Public school district in Wyoming

Washakie County School District #2 is a public school district based in Ten Sleep, Wyoming, United States. With an enrollment of just 94 students (as of October 1, 2008), it is the smallest school district in the state of Wyoming.

== Geography ==
Washakie County School District #2 serves the eastern portion of Washakie County. The town of Ten Sleep is the only incorporated place in the district.

== Schools ==
- Ten Sleep School (Grades K-12)

== Student demographics ==
The following figures are as of October 1, 2008.

- Total District Enrollment:
- Student enrollment by gender
  - Male:
  - Female:
- Student enrollment by ethnicity
  - White:
  - Hispanic:
  - Black:
  - Asian or Pacific Islander:

== See also ==
- List of school districts in Wyoming
