= Fremont County School District Number 25 =

School district in Wyoming, United States

- Fremont County, Wyoming

District information
- Superintendent: Jodi Ibach
- Schools: Elementary 4, Middle 1, High 2
- NCES District ID: 5605220 -->

Students and staff
- Students: 2,360
- Teachers: 171
- Student–teacher ratio: 14.50

Other information
- Website: fremont25.org

Fremont County School District #25 is a public school district based in Riverton, Wyoming, United States.

== Geography ==
Fremont County School District #25 serves east central Fremont County, including the following communities:

- Incorporated places
  - City of Riverton
- Census-designated places (Note: All census-designated places are unincorporated.)
  - Arapahoe (partial)

== Schools ==
=== High school ===
- Grades 9-12
  - Riverton High School
  - Frontier Academy

=== Middle school ===
- Grades 6-8
  - Riverton Middle School

=== Elementary schools ===
- Grades 3-5
  - Rendezvous Elementary School
- Grades Kinder Boost-2
  - Jackson Elementary School
- Grades Kinder Boost-4
  - Willow Creek Elementary
- Grades Kinder Boost-4
  - Aspen Elementary

== Student demographics ==
The following figures are as of January 1, 2025.

- Total District Enrollment: 2,360
- Student enrollment by gender
  - Male: 1,197 (50.72%)
  - Female: 1,163 (49.28%)
- Student enrollment by ethnicity
  - American Indian or Alaska Native: 556 (23.56%)
  - Asian: 17 (1.02%)
  - Black or African American: 24 (1.18%)
  - Hispanic or Latino: 266 (11.27%)
  - White: 1413 (59.87%)

== See also ==
- List of school districts in Wyoming
