= Meeteetse, Wyoming =

- Town
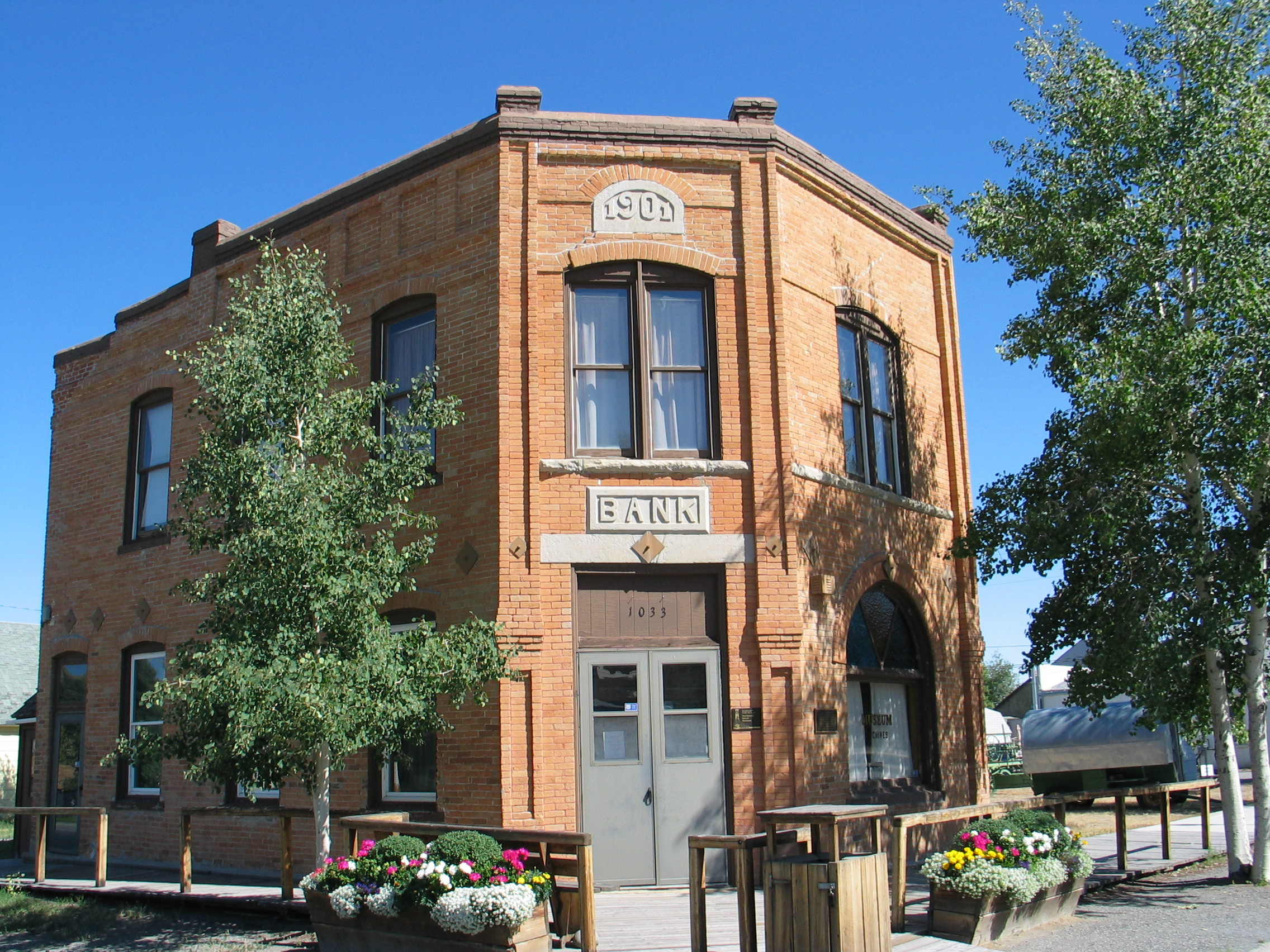
- The First National Bank of Meeteetse, built in 1901
- Motto: "Where Chiefs Meet"
- Location of Meeteetse in Park County, Wyoming
- Coordinates: 44°09′11″N 108°51′50″W
- Country: United States
- State: Wyoming
- County: Park
- Incorporated: August 7, 1901

Area
  - Total: 0.87 sq mi (2.26 km^{2})
  - Land: 0.87 sq mi (2.26 km^{2})
  - Water: 0 sq mi (0.00 km^{2})
- Elevation: 5,922 ft (1,805 m)

Population (2020)
  - Total: 309
  - Density: 370.7/sq mi (143.12/km^{2})
- Time zone: UTC-7 (Mountain (MST))
  - Summer (DST): UTC-6 (MDT)
- ZIP code: 82433
- Area code: 307
- FIPS code: 56-51720
- GNIS feature ID: 2412979

Meeteetse is a town in Park County, Wyoming, United States. As of the 2020 census, Meeteetse had a population of 309.

== History ==
The area that would become Meeteetse was occupied by the Shoshone and Crow people. The 1868 Fort Laramie Treaty placed the Crow Reservation to the north and Wind River Reservation to the South leaving the area open for white settlers. Around 1878 Otto Franc began Pitchfork Ranch near what is now Meeteetse. William McNally arrived around 1886 and built a blacksmith shop.

In 1883 the Meeteetse Post Office was established by Margaret B. Wilson. It was located on the Meeteetse Creek. In 1896, 36 acres of land by the Greybull River were platted. Wilson moved the post office to the new townsite.

Meeteetse is a Shoshone term for "nearby" or possibly "resting place". The town takes its name from the creek.

It was incorporated as a village in 1899. Then as a town in 1901. When Park County was split from Big Horn County in 1909, Meeteetse became part of Park County. The town had grown rapidly. The Wyoming Business Directory for 1901-2 listed, among other businesses, three hotels, seven mining companies, jewelers, a lumberyard, two banks, and a hardware store. The town drew business from the nearby mining town of Kirwin. Kirwin did not have saloons so the workers came to Meeteetse.

In the 1920s the town built a light system. In 1923 a bigger school needed to be built.

During the 1920s and '30s, Charles Belden took photographs of Pitchfork Ranch and the area around Meeteetse. The photos were published nationally in magazines. One made the cover photo for Life, others were published in National Geographic, Saturday Evening Post, and others.

Meeteetse's population in the 1960s was around 600 people.

In the 2000s, a group of Carmelite Monks began building a stone monastery cloistered in the mountains near Meeteetse.

In 2023 the town council voted to annex 390 acres into the town. The town previously was 557 acres. There were no immediate plans for the land, though the mayor said it could be used for light industrial companies or residential.

In 2025 the city annexed 78 acres. Also in 2025 there were plans to build a bronze foundry.

== Geography ==
Meeteetse is in the Bighorn Basin next to the Greybull river. The Absaroka Mountains are to the west and the Bighorn Mountains to the east. The riparian area is home to migrating waterfowl, white-tailed deer, mule deer, and pronghorn antelope.

According to the United States Census Bureau, the town has a total area of 0.87 square miles (2.25 km^{2}), all land.

=== Climate ===
Sunshine 3NE is a weather station near the Lower Sunshine Reservoir, a lake nearby to the south of Meeteetse.

Climate data for Sunshine 3NE, Wyoming, 1991–2020 normals, 1963-2020 extremes: 6224ft (1897m)
Month	Jan	Feb	Mar	Apr	May	Jun	Jul	Aug	Sep	Oct	Nov	Dec	Year
Record high °F (°C)	65 (18)	65 (18)	72 (22)	79 (26)	87 (31)	91 (33)	93 (34)	93 (34)	87 (31)	81 (27)	69 (21)	68 (20)	93 (34)
Mean maximum °F (°C)	53.1 (11.7)	54.6 (12.6)	61.9 (16.6)	71.1 (21.7)	77.2 (25.1)	83.9 (28.8)	88.4 (31.3)	86.7 (30.4)	82.8 (28.2)	74.8 (23.8)	62.3 (16.8)	53.8 (12.1)	89.2 (31.8)
Mean daily maximum °F (°C)	34.1 (1.2)	34.5 (1.4)	42.9 (6.1)	49.2 (9.6)	57.9 (14.4)	68.5 (20.3)	77.3 (25.2)	75.8 (24.3)	66.0 (18.9)	53.2 (11.8)	41.4 (5.2)	33.0 (0.6)	52.8 (11.6)
Daily mean °F (°C)	20.8 (−6.2)	21.4 (−5.9)	29.6 (−1.3)	36.1 (2.3)	45.1 (7.3)	53.5 (11.9)	60.8 (16.0)	59.4 (15.2)	50.4 (10.2)	39.1 (3.9)	27.9 (−2.3)	19.9 (−6.7)	38.7 (3.7)
Mean daily minimum °F (°C)	7.5 (−13.6)	8.3 (−13.2)	16.2 (−8.8)	23.1 (−4.9)	32.2 (0.1)	38.6 (3.7)	44.4 (6.9)	43.0 (6.1)	34.9 (1.6)	25.1 (−3.8)	14.5 (−9.7)	6.8 (−14.0)	24.6 (−4.1)
Mean minimum °F (°C)	−15.5 (−26.4)	−13.6 (−25.3)	−3.4 (−19.7)	8.1 (−13.3)	19.9 (−6.7)	29.0 (−1.7)	36.7 (2.6)	34.1 (1.2)	23.5 (−4.7)	7.4 (−13.7)	−8.2 (−22.3)	−14.9 (−26.1)	−23.1 (−30.6)
Record low °F (°C)	−36 (−38)	−39 (−39)	−31 (−35)	−9 (−23)	2 (−17)	20 (−7)	27 (−3)	25 (−4)	−1 (−18)	−10 (−23)	−28 (−33)	−40 (−40)	−40 (−40)
Average precipitation inches (mm)	0.31 (7.9)	0.40 (10)	0.71 (18)	1.50 (38)	2.88 (73)	2.09 (53)	1.36 (35)	1.09 (28)	1.32 (34)	1.11 (28)	0.56 (14)	0.46 (12)	13.79 (350.9)
Average snowfall inches (cm)	6.2 (16)	7.8 (20)	10.2 (26)	13.6 (35)	6.2 (16)	0.9 (2.3)	0.0 (0.0)	0.0 (0.0)	1.6 (4.1)	8.0 (20)	9.1 (23)	8.5 (22)	72.1 (184.4)
Source 1: NOAA
Source 2: XMACIS2 (records & monthly max/mins)

== Demographics ==
Historical population
Census	Pop.	Note	%±
1910	207		—
1920	300		44.9%
1930	296		−1.3%
1940	373		26.0%
1950	404		8.3%
1960	514		27.2%
1970	459		−10.7%
1980	512		11.5%
1990	368		−28.1%
2000	351		−4.6%
2010	327		−6.8%
2020	309		−5.5%
U.S. Decennial Census

=== 2010 census ===
As of the census of 2010, there were 327 people, 153 households, and 94 families residing in the town. The population density was 375.9 inhabitants per square mile (145.1/km^{2}). There were 177 housing units at an average density of 203.4 per square mile (78.5/km^{2}). The racial makeup of the town was 97.6% White, 0.6% African American, 0.6% Native American, 0.6% from other races, and 0.6% from two or more races. Hispanic or Latino people of any race were 1.8% of the population.

There were 153 households, of which 20.3% had children under the age of 18 living with them, 52.3% were married couples living together, 5.2% had a female householder with no husband present, 3.9% had a male householder with no wife present, and 38.6% were non-families. 33.3% of all households were made up of individuals, and 14.4% had someone living alone who was 65 years of age or older. The average household size was 2.14 and the average family size was 2.74.

The median age in the town was 51.3 years. 20.8% of residents were under the age of 18; 4.6% were between the ages of 18 and 24; 16% were from 25 to 44; 35.1% were from 45 to 64; and 23.5% were 65 years of age or older. The gender makeup of the town was 51.7% male and 48.3% female.

=== 2000 census ===
As of the census of 2000, there were 351 people, 151 households, and 94 families residing in the town. The population density was 428.7 people per square mile (165.3/km^{2}). There were 188 housing units at an average density of 229.6 per square mile (88.5/km^{2}). The racial makeup of the town was 97.15% White, 0.28% Native American, 0.28% Pacific Islander, 0.85% from other races, and 1.42% from two or more races. Hispanic or Latino peopleof any race were 2.56% of the population.

There were 151 households, out of which 27.2% had children under the age of 18 living with them, 56.3% were married couples living together, 4.6% had a female householder with no husband present, and 37.1% were non-families. 32.5% of all households were made up of individuals, and 15.9% had someone living alone who was 65 years of age or older. The average household size was 2.32 and the average family size was 3.00.

In the town, the population was spread out, with 24.8% under the age of 18, 5.4% from 18 to 24, 24.8% from 25 to 44, 28.5% from 45 to 64, and 16.5% who were 65 years of age or older. The median age was 40 years. For every 100 females, there were 106.5 males. For every 100 females age 18 and over, there were 95.6 males.

The median income for a household in the town was $29,167, and the median income for a family was $31,953. Males had a median income of $21,250 versus $18,125 for females. The per capita income for the town was $12,030. About 5.8% of families and 10.9% of the population were below the poverty line, including 11.6% of those under age 18 and 14.9% of those age 65 or over.

== Economy ==
The economy is dependent on oil and gas production, agriculture, and tourism. The town is 80 miles away from the East Entrance to Yellowstone National Park.

== Government ==
Meeteetse has a mayor and town council. There are four council members. The positions are non-partisan and the terms are four years. J.W. "Bill" Yetter is mayor. His term ends in 2026.

== Arts and culture ==
The Vic Payne Studio and Gallery features a variety of artists and a variety of mediums. It is located in the restored Mercantile. The Meeteetse Museums have local history, the Charles Belden Museum of Western Photography, and various historical buildings.

Meeteetse has a public library, a branch of the Park County Library System.

== Education ==
Public education in the town of Meeteetse is provided by Park County School District #16. Meeteetse School, a K–12 campus, serves the town.

== Nature ==
Meeteetse was where the last known wild population of black-footed ferrets was discovered in 1981. All black-footed ferrets on earth are descended from this group of about 130, which had dwindled to 18 individuals by 1985. They were all captured, and seven of those managed to breed, thus saving the species.

== See also ==
- List of municipalities in Wyoming
