= Riverton High School (Wyoming) =

Location
- 2001 West Sunset; Riverton, Wyoming; United States; 43°01′56″N 108°24′58″W

Information
- Type: Public
- Motto: Educate, Empower, Inspire
- Established: 1920
- School district: Fremont County School District Number 25
- NCES School ID: 560522000286
- Principal: Thomas Jassman
- Faculty: 91
- Grades: 9 to 12
- Enrollment: 668 (2025)
- Colors: Cardinal, black and white
- Athletics conference: 3A/4A West
- Mascot: Wolverines
- Nickname: Big Red
- Website: rhs.fremont25.org/o/rhs

Riverton High School is a high school in Riverton, Wyoming and forms part of the Fremont County School District Number 25. In 2017, it had an enrollment of 787 students and a faculty of 46 teachers in grades 9-12. In 2018, it had an enrollment of 766 students and a faculty of 47 teachers in grades 9-12.
