= Upton, Wyoming =

- Town
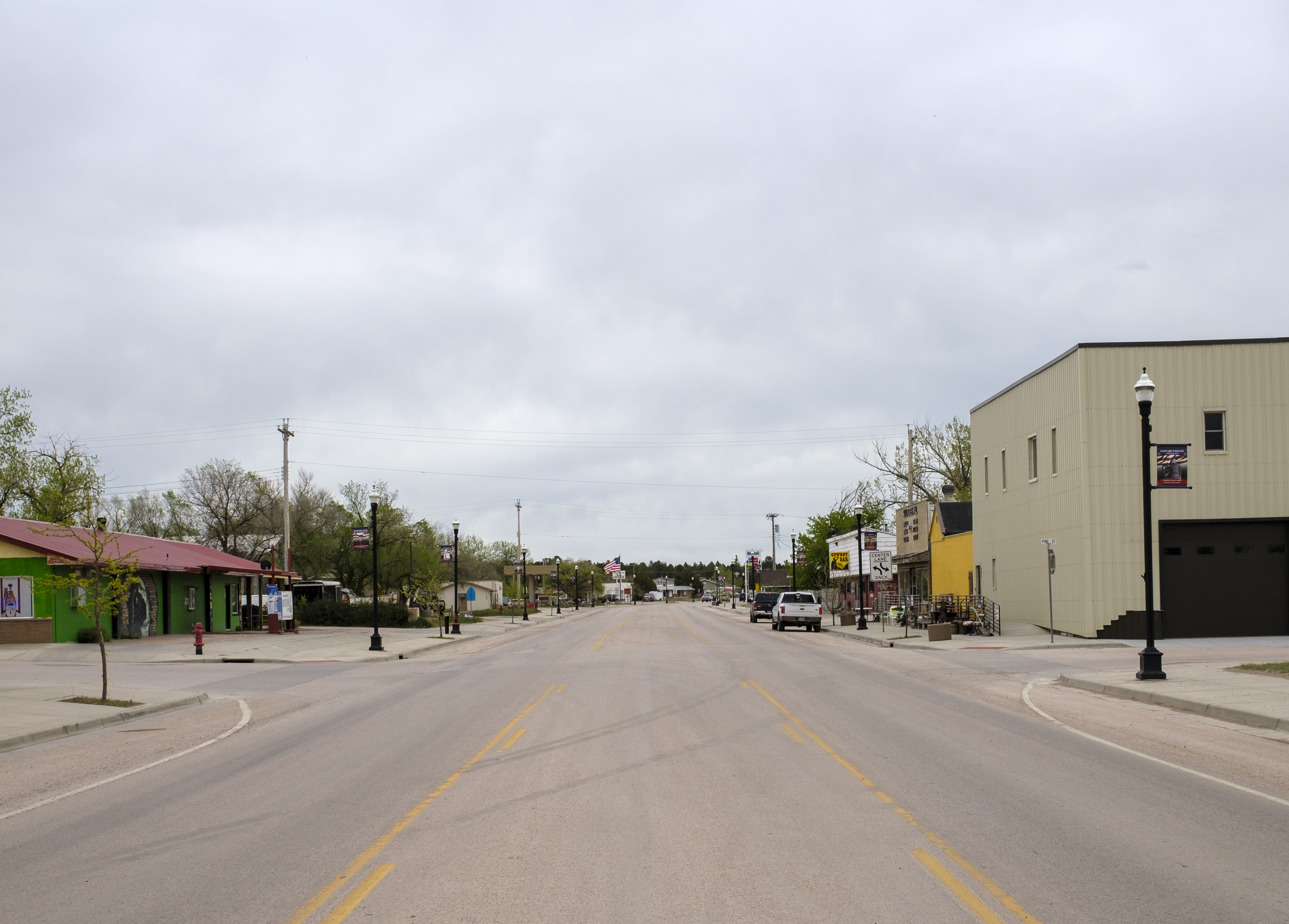
- Downtown Upton

- Seal
- Motto: The Best Town on Earth
- Location of Upton in Weston County, Wyoming.
- Coordinates: 44°06′08″N 104°37′33″W
- Country: United States
- State: Wyoming
- County: Weston

Area
  - Total: 2.97 sq mi (7.68 km^{2})
  - Land: 2.97 sq mi (7.68 km^{2})
  - Water: 0 sq mi (0.00 km^{2})
- Elevation: 4,239 ft (1,292 m)

Population (2020)
  - Total: 898
  - Density: 356.3/sq mi (137.56/km^{2})
- Time zone: UTC-7 (MST)
  - Summer (DST): UTC-6 (MDT)
- ZIP code: 82730
- Area code: 307
- FIPS code: 56-79125
- GNIS feature ID: 2413414
- Website: www.townofupton.com

Upton is a town in Weston County, Wyoming, United States. The population was 898 at the 2020 census. The slogan of the town is: "The best town on earth".

== Geography ==
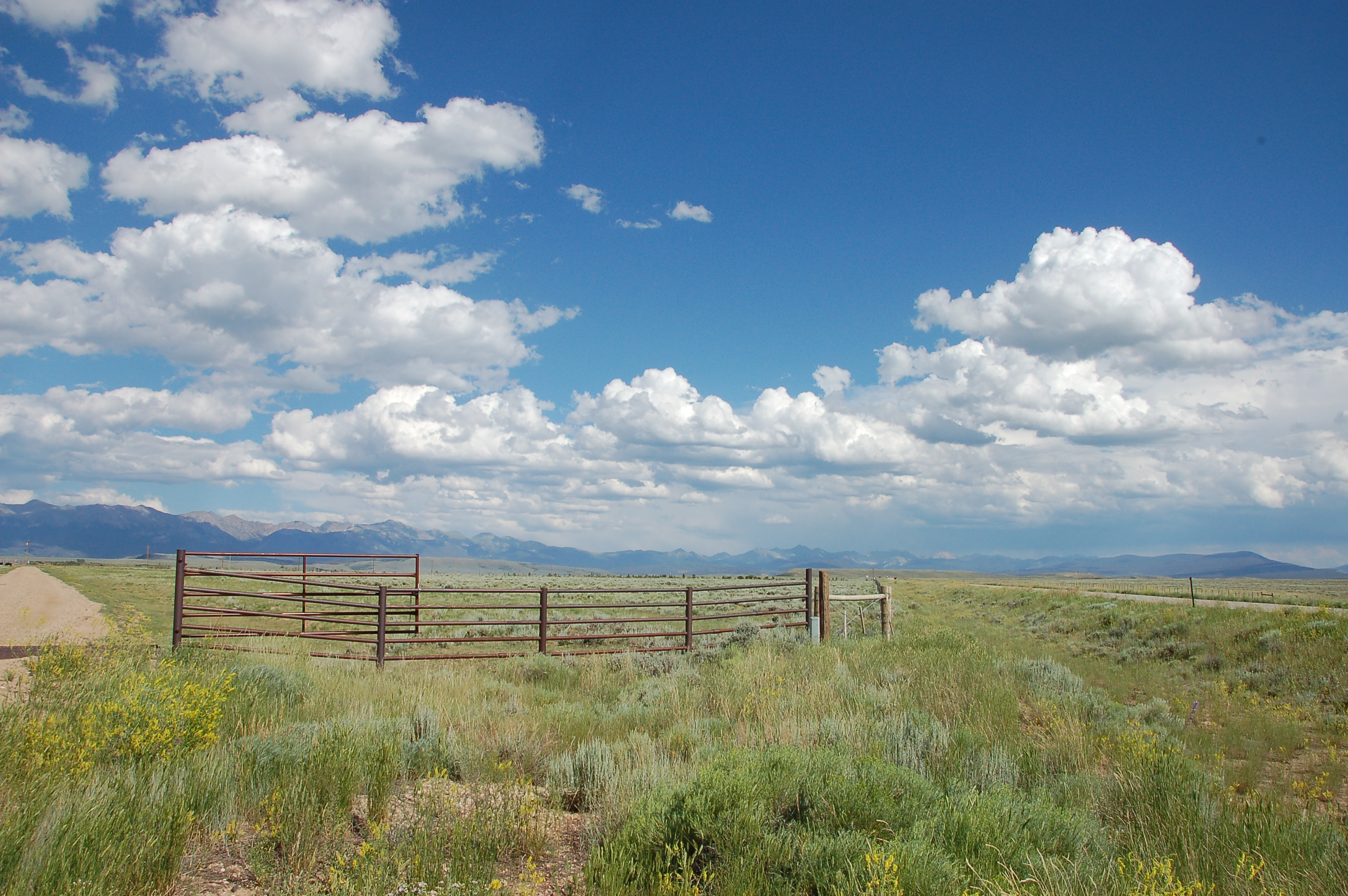
Thunder Basin National Grassland

Upton has a total area of 2.96 square miles (7.67 km^{2}), all land.

Upton is home to an abundance of wildlife. Nearby are lakes and streams with many fish species.

=== Climate ===
Climate data for Upton, Wyoming (1991–2020 normals, extremes 1909–present)
Month	Jan	Feb	Mar	Apr	May	Jun	Jul	Aug	Sep	Oct	Nov	Dec	Year
Record high °F (°C)	65 (18)	68 (20)	81 (27)	88 (31)	95 (35)	105 (41)	110 (43)	102 (39)	101 (38)	91 (33)	85 (29)	66 (19)	110 (43)
Mean maximum °F (°C)	51.5 (10.8)	54.7 (12.6)	68.7 (20.4)	77.6 (25.3)	85.0 (29.4)	93.8 (34.3)	98.8 (37.1)	97.4 (36.3)	92.9 (33.8)	81.7 (27.6)	65.5 (18.6)	52.4 (11.3)	100.3 (37.9)
Mean daily maximum °F (°C)	32.5 (0.3)	35.0 (1.7)	47.0 (8.3)	55.8 (13.2)	65.3 (18.5)	77.2 (25.1)	86.9 (30.5)	85.3 (29.6)	74.8 (23.8)	58.7 (14.8)	43.5 (6.4)	33.2 (0.7)	57.9 (14.4)
Daily mean °F (°C)	21.0 (−6.1)	23.4 (−4.8)	34.5 (1.4)	42.8 (6.0)	52.5 (11.4)	63.2 (17.3)	71.8 (22.1)	69.9 (21.1)	59.6 (15.3)	45.3 (7.4)	31.5 (−0.3)	21.8 (−5.7)	44.8 (7.1)
Mean daily minimum °F (°C)	9.5 (−12.5)	11.8 (−11.2)	21.9 (−5.6)	29.7 (−1.3)	39.6 (4.2)	49.2 (9.6)	56.7 (13.7)	54.4 (12.4)	44.3 (6.8)	31.8 (−0.1)	19.5 (−6.9)	10.3 (−12.1)	31.6 (−0.2)
Mean minimum °F (°C)	−13.6 (−25.3)	−9.9 (−23.3)	1.8 (−16.8)	15.5 (−9.2)	25.1 (−3.8)	37.1 (2.8)	46.3 (7.9)	41.7 (5.4)	39.8 (4.3)	13.1 (−10.5)	−0.3 (−17.9)	−10.6 (−23.7)	−21.5 (−29.7)
Record low °F (°C)	−45 (−43)	−34 (−37)	−29 (−34)	−11 (−24)	5 (−15)	26 (−3)	30 (−1)	24 (−4)	6 (−14)	−10 (−23)	−26 (−32)	−42 (−41)	−45 (−43)
Average precipitation inches (mm)	0.45 (11)	0.46 (12)	0.82 (21)	1.77 (45)	2.83 (72)	2.57 (65)	2.13 (54)	1.42 (36)	1.20 (30)	1.48 (38)	0.58 (15)	0.45 (11)	16.16 (410)
Average snowfall inches (cm)	8.2 (21)	8.1 (21)	6.2 (16)	5.3 (13)	0.7 (1.8)	0.1 (0.25)	0.0 (0.0)	0.0 (0.0)	0.1 (0.25)	3.1 (7.9)	6.3 (16)	8.3 (21)	46.4 (118)
Average precipitation days (≥ 0.01 in)	4.3	4.3	4.6	8.1	9.5	8.9	6.8	5.1	4.4	5.3	3.2	4.4	68.9
Average snowy days (≥ 0.1 in)	4.0	4.0	2.9	1.7	0.2	0.0	0.0	0.0	0.1	1.0	2.3	4.3	20.5
Source: NOAA

== Demographics ==
Historical population
Census	Pop.	Note	%±
1910	244		—
1920	306		25.4%
1930	373		21.9%
1940	545		46.1%
1950	951		74.5%
1960	1,224		28.7%
1970	987		−19.4%
1980	1,193		20.9%
1990	980		−17.9%
2000	872		−11.0%
2010	1,100		26.1%
2020	898		−18.4%
U.S. Decennial Census

=== 2010 census ===
As of the 2010 United States census of 2010, there were 1,100 people, 467 households, and 303 families residing in the town. The population density was 371.6 inhabitants per square mile (143.5/km^{2}). There were 539 housing units at an average density of 182.1 per square mile (70.3/km^{2}). The racial makeup of the town was 95.6% White, 0.2% African American, 1.7% Native American, 0.5% Asian, 0.7% from other races, and 1.3% from two or more races. Hispanic or Latino of any race were 2.3% of the population.

There were 467 households, of which 29.3% had children under the age of 18 living with them, 52.2% were married couples living together, 5.4% had a female householder with no husband present, 7.3% had a male householder with no wife present, and 35.1% were non-families. 28.7% of all households were made up of individuals, and 12.2% had someone living alone who was 65 years of age or older. The average household size was 2.36 and the average family size was 2.88.

The median age in the town was 38.4 years. 25.5% of residents were under the age of 18; 8.7% were between the ages of 18 and 24; 23.1% were from 25 to 44; 25.6% were from 45 to 64; and 17.1% were 65 years of age or older. The gender makeup of the town was 50.5% male and 49.5% female.

=== 2000 census ===
As of the 2000 United States census of 2000, there were 872 people, 359 households, and 255 families residing in the town. The population density was 663.8 people per square mile (257.0/km^{2}). There were 441 housing units at an average density of 335.7 per square mile (130.0/km^{2}). The racial makeup of the town was 95.99% White, 0.69% Native American, 0.34% Asian, 0.34% from other races, and 2.64% from two or more races. Hispanic or Latino of any race were 1.83% of the population.

There were 359 households, out of which 32.3% had children under the age of 18 living with them, 64.6% were married couples living together, 3.9% had a female householder with no husband present, and 28.7% were non-families. 25.9% of all households were made up of individuals, and 15.0% had someone living alone who was 65 years of age or older. The average household size was 2.43 and the average family size was 2.93.

In the town, the population was spread out, with 26.4% under the age of 18, 7.2% from 18 to 24, 24.2% from 25 to 44, 24.7% from 45 to 64, and 17.5% who were 65 years of age or older. The median age was 41 years. For every 100 females, there were 94.6 males. For every 100 females age 18 and over, there were 94.0 males.

The median income for a household in the town was $31,053, and the median income for a family was $39,091. Males had a median income of $40,208 versus $17,500 for females. The per capita income for the town was $15,165. About 6.7% of families and 11.1% of the population were below the poverty line, including 10.2% of those under age 18 and 14.4% of those age 65 or over.

== Education ==
Public education in the town of Upton is provided by Weston County School District #7. Schools serving the town include Upton Elementary School (grades K–5), Upton Middle School (grades 6–8), and Upton High School (grades 9–12).

Upton has a public library, a branch of the Weston County Library System.

== Attractions ==
Upton is home to The Red Onion Museum, which features work from local artist Dave Paulley. The Weston County Gazette, the town's local newspaper, has been operating in Upton for nearly a century. Old Town offers a glimpse of pioneer times with buildings relocated from the original townsite.

== See also ==
- List of towns in Wyoming
