= Lincoln County School District Number 1 =

School district in Wyoming, United States

Lincoln County School District No.1

Address
- 11 Adaville Drive Diamondville, Wyoming, 83116; United States

District information
- Grades: Kindergarten - 12
- Superintendent: Teresa Chaulk
- Enrollment: 629

Other information
- Website: www.rangers1.net

The Lincoln County School District No. 1 is a public school district in Lincoln County, Wyoming, United States, based in Diamondville, Wyoming.

The district includes the municipalities of Diamondville, Kemmerer, and Opal, as well as the census-designated place of Oakley, and most of the Fontenelle CDP.

== Schools ==
The Lincoln County School District #1 has one elementary school, one Jr/Sr high school, and one alternative school.

- Grades K-6
  - Canyon Elementary School
- Grades 7-12
  - Kemmerer High School (Also called Kemmerer Jr/Sr High School).
- Alternative schools:
- New Frontier High School
