= Diamondville, Wyoming =

- Town
- Motto: "A Diamond in the Rough"
- Location of Diamondville in Lincoln County, Wyoming.
- Coordinates: 41°46′38″N 110°32′07″W
- Country: United States
- State: Wyoming
- County: Lincoln

Area
  - Total: 1.17 sq mi (3.03 km^{2})
  - Land: 1.17 sq mi (3.02 km^{2})
  - Water: 0.0039 sq mi (0.01 km^{2})
- Elevation: 6,893 ft (2,101 m)

Population (2020)
  - Total: 520
  - Density: 648.9/sq mi (250.53/km^{2})
- Time zone: UTC-7 (Mountain (MST))
  - Summer (DST): UTC-6 (MDT)
- ZIP code: 83116
- Area code: 307
- FIPS code: 56-20110
- GNIS feature ID: 2412427
- Website: diamondvillewyo.com

Diamondville is a town in Lincoln County, Wyoming, United States, often used as a suburb of neighboring Kemmerer. The population was 520 at the 2020 census.

== History ==
Harrison Church discovered coal near the Hams Fork River in 1868. He gathered financial backing from a group in Minneapolis, and they formed the Hams Fork River Coal Company. Diamondville was built to house the miners. The management of the coal company came to S.F. Fields in Salt Lake City. He sought backing from the Anaconda Mining Company and renamed it Diamond Coal and Coke Company.

Many of the workers came from Almy, Wyoming where the mines had several explosions. The miners mainly lived in a "shack town" as no houses were built.

The town was named for the superior-grade coal that came from the local mines. The coal resembled black diamonds.

In 1894 a station for the Oregon Short Line Railroad was built in Diamondville. In 1898 the river was rerouted and the town moved from on the hill south of town into the valley area.

By the early 1900s there was a Mercantile, butcher shop, bakeries, photography studio, theater, dress shop, hardware store, and thirteen saloons. The Daly Hotel was a three story structure with fifty rooms, a dining room, barbershop, and saloon.

The town was incorporated on March 2, 1901. Thomas Sneddon, superintendent of the Diamondville Mine, became the first mayor.

The Diamondville Mine closed in August 1930. There is no longer an underground mine but there is an open-pit mine nearby.

=== Mine ===
The mine suffered a number of fires, explosions, and deaths during its operations. The first recorded fire was in December 1898. Practice at the time was to seal off the area, robbing the fire of oxygen, and continue operations in other areas of the mine. The fire continued for six weeks, eventually resulting in two deaths. Another fire started February 1901. This time miners and horses were left inside when it was sealed. The final report listed thirty two deaths. In December 1905 a coal dust explosion killed eighteen.

The miners led strikes in 1898, 1899, and 1903. There was also a statewide strike in 1908. The mine reacted strongly to these attempts at reform. In 1898 the miners and families were evicted. In 1899 non-union men were brought in to operate the mine. This time wives and daughters of the union workers marched on the mines. In response the mine called in over seventy five deputies. In 1903 the United Mine Workers brought in Mother Jones to Wyoming to organize several mines. The superintendent replied that she would be jailed if she attempted to influence the mine in Diamondville.

== Geography ==
According to the United States Census Bureau, the town has a total area of 1.17 square miles (3.03 km^{2}), all land.

== Demographics ==
Historical population
Census	Pop.	Note	%±
1910	696		—
1920	726		4.3%
1930	812		11.8%
1940	586		−27.8%
1950	415		−29.2%
1960	398		−4.1%
1970	485		21.9%
1980	1,000		106.2%
1990	864		−13.6%
2000	716		−17.1%
2010	737		2.9%
2020	520		−29.4%
U.S. Decennial Census

=== 2010 census ===
As of the census of 2010, there were 737 people, 320 households, and 203 families living in the town. The population density was 629.9 inhabitants per square mile (243.2/km^{2}). There were 363 housing units at an average density of 310.3 per square mile (119.8/km^{2}). The racial makeup of the town was 93.4% White, 0.1% African American, 0.7% Native American, 0.4% Asian, 0.3% Pacific Islander, 2.8% from other races, and 2.3% from two or more races. Hispanic or Latino of any race were 9.1% of the population.

There were 320 households, of which 27.2% had children under the age of 18 living with them, 51.3% were married couples living together, 6.3% had a female householder with no husband present, 5.9% had a male householder with no wife present, and 36.6% were non-families. 30.0% of all households were made up of individuals, and 12.2% had someone living alone who was 65 years of age or older. The average household size was 2.30 and the average family size was 2.86.

The median age in the town was 42.5 years. 21% of residents were under the age of 18; 7.5% were between the ages of 18 and 24; 23.5% were from 25 to 44; 33.5% were from 45 to 64; and 14.5% were 65 years of age or older. The gender makeup of the town was 49.5% male and 50.5% female.

== Government ==
Diamondville has a mayor and town council. All are elected to four-year terms. There are four council members.

In November 2025 Eric Backman was appointed mayor. He was serving as Mayor Pro-Tem after former mayor Clint Bowen resigned. As Backman is filling a term, the mayor position will be up for election in 2026.

== Arts and culture ==
The Diamondville Municipal Park has a ballpark, tennis court, basketball court, horseshoe pits, skate park, as well as picnic tables and a pavilion.

The Community Fishing Pond was created around 2003. The fish hatchery in Daniel, Wyoming stocks the pond.

== Education ==
Diamondville is in Lincoln County School District Number 1.

== See also ==
- List of municipalities in Wyoming
