= Ethete, Wyoming =

Ethete, Wyoming Koonoutoseii' (Arapaho)
- CDP
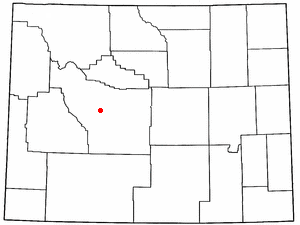
- Location of Ethete, Wyoming
- Coordinates: 43°00′03″N 108°43′23″W
- Country: United States
- State: Wyoming
- County: Fremont

Area
  - Total: 32.4 sq mi (83.9 km^{2})
  - Land: 32.4 sq mi (83.9 km^{2})
  - Water: 0 sq mi (0.0 km^{2})
- Elevation: 5,354 ft (1,632 m)

Population (2010)
  - Total: 1,553
  - Density: 47.9/sq mi (18.5/km^{2})
- Time zone: UTC-7 (Mountain (MST))
  - Summer (DST): UTC-6 (MDT)
- ZIP code: 82520
- Area code: 307
- FIPS code: 56-25330
- GNIS feature ID: 2408092

Ethete (Arapaho: Koonoutoseii') is a census-designated place (CDP) in Fremont County, Wyoming, United States. The population was 1,553 at the 2010 census. The town is located on the Wind River Indian Reservation. It grew up around the Episcopal St. Michael's Mission.

== Geography ==
According to the United States Census Bureau, the CDP has a total area of 32.4 square miles (83.9 km^{2}), all land.

== Demographics ==
As of the census of 2000, there were 1,455 people, 342 households, and 298 families residing in the CDP. The population density was 44.9 people per square mile (17.3/km^{2}). There were 367 housing units at an average density of 11.3/sq mi (4.4/km^{2}). The racial makeup of the CDP was 4.95% White, 94.23% Native American, 0.07% Asian, 0.07% from other races, and 0.69% from two or more races. 2.06% of the population were Hispanic or Latino of any race.

There were 342 households, out of which 45.6% had children under the age of 18 living with them, 43.6% were married couples living together, 33.9% had a female householder with no husband present, and 12.6% were non-families. 11.4% of all households were made up of individuals, and 1.8% had someone living alone who was 65 years of age or older. The average household size was 4.25 and the average family size was 4.49.

In the CDP, the population was spread out, with 40.5% under the age of 18, 12.4% from 18 to 24, 24.8% from 25 to 44, 17.3% from 45 to 64, and 4.9% who were 65 years of age or older. The median age was 23 years. For every 100 females, there were 105.5 males. For every 100 females age 18 and over, there were 95.3 males.

The median income for a household in the CDP was $24,130, and the median income for a family was $24,762. Males had a median income of $22,411 versus $25,179 for females. The per capita income for the CDP was $7,129. 34.4% of the population and 33.9% of families were below the poverty line. Out of the total population, 42.0% of those under the age of 18 and 29.6% of those 65 and older were living below the poverty line.

== Education ==
The majority of Ethete is served by Fremont County School District #14. A very small portion of the CDP is located within the boundaries of Fremont County School District #21.
