= Kemmerer, Wyoming =

City in and county seat of Lincoln County, Wyoming

- City
- Motto: "An Aquarium in Stone"
- Interactive map of Kemmerer, Wyoming
- Coordinates: 41°45′42″N 110°33′08″W
- Country: United States
- State: Wyoming
- County: Lincoln

Area
  - Total: 7.81 sq mi (20.2 km^{2})
  - Land: 7.80 sq mi (20.2 km^{2})
  - Water: 0.01 sq mi (0.026 km^{2})
- Elevation: 6,949 ft (2,118 m)

Population (2020)
  - Total: 2,415
  - Density: 352.4/sq mi (136.1/km^{2})
- Time zone: UTC−7 (Mountain (MST))
  - Summer (DST): UTC−6 (MDT)
- ZIP Code: 83101
- Area code: 307
- FIPS code: 56-42005
- GNIS feature ID: 2410176
- Website: kemmerer.org

Kemmerer is a city in and the county seat of Lincoln County, Wyoming, United States. The population was 2,415 at the 2020 census. Founded in 1897, the town grew up around the coal mines of the Ham's Fork field. The town was struck by one of the worst mining disasters in Wyoming history in 1923, and in the 2020s it became the site of TerraPower's Natrium reactor, the first utility-scale advanced nuclear power plant to begin construction in the United States.

In 1902 James Cash Penney opened his first Golden Rule Store in Kemmerer, the origin of the J. C. Penney chain; the store and Penney's house form a National Historic Landmark district. Kemmerer lies in the fossil-rich Green River Formation country about 15 miles (24 km) east of Fossil Butte National Monument.

== History ==
=== Coal and the railroad ===
The explorer John C. Frémont noted coal in the area during his second expedition in 1843. After the Oregon Short Line Railroad was built through the region, the Union Pacific Coal Company opened the first underground mine nearby in 1881.

=== Founding ===
Kemmerer was founded in 1897 by Patrick J. Quealy (1857–1930), an Irish-born coal operator, in partnership with the Pennsylvania coal financier Mahlon S. Kemmerer, for whom Quealy named the town. In May 1897 Quealy and the Kemmerers organized four companies to develop the Ham's Fork coal field—the Kemmerer Coal Company, the Frontier Supply Company, the Ham's Fork Cattle Company, and the Uinta Improvement Company—with the Kemmerers providing the capital and Quealy, as vice-president and general manager, directing operations in Wyoming.

Quealy insisted that both the coal company and the town be named for Mahlon Kemmerer over the objection of the financier's son, the attorney John L. Kemmerer, who favored "Frontier," "Wasatch," or "National" and cautioned that naming the town after an individual might prove awkward if the property were ever sold. When the Oregon Short Line proposed that the town's railroad depot instead be named "Diamondville," Quealy threatened to cancel the townsite agreement until the railroad accepted the name Kemmerer.

Quealy laid out the townsite about a mile south of the company mining camp of Frontier and developed Kemmerer deliberately as an "independent town." Unlike the neighboring company towns of Frontier and Diamondville, where the coal companies leased land and housing to employees, the Short Line Land and Improvement Company—incorporated in February 1898 with Quealy as secretary—sold town lots outright to anyone who would build, while Quealy and Kemmerer retained the coal and mineral rights. This policy allowed independent businesses to establish themselves. The town was organized in 1897 and incorporated in January 1899; electricity and water were supplied by the company-owned Frontier Supply Company, which used a secondhand generator purchased in Utah. Quealy was the founding president of the town's First National Bank, established in 1900.

=== Mining disasters ===
Kemmerer suffered two of the deadliest mine disasters in Wyoming history within thirteen months. On August 14, 1923, an explosion tore through the Kemmerer Coal Company's Frontier No. 1 mine, killing 99 miners—the second-worst coal-mining disaster in the state's history. Only about 135 of the usual 250 men were underground that day because of a holiday; investigators concluded that a fire boss had ignited accumulated gas while relighting his safety lamp, and rescuers saved several dozen men, some of whom had barricaded themselves against the flames. The dead were buried in mass graves in the Kemmerer cemetery. On September 16, 1924, a second explosion, at a Kemmerer Coal Company mine at nearby Sublet, killed 39 more miners; together the two disasters left about 97 widows and 133 fatherless children.

=== Later coal history ===
In 1950 the Kemmerer operation converted to strip mining and became, for a time, the largest open-pit coal mine in the United States. The Kemmerer Coal Company was later acquired by the Pittsburg & Midway Coal Mining Company, the mine subsequently passed to the Westmoreland Coal Company, and in 2024 the operation was reported sold to a California-based buyer. The pit remained in operation with an annual output of about 5 million tons.

== Geography ==
According to the United States Census Bureau, the city has a total area of 7.81 square miles (20.23 km^{2}), of which 7.80 square miles (20.20 km^{2}) is land and 0.01 square miles (0.03 km^{2}) is water. Kemmerer sits at an elevation of about 6,949 feet (2,118 m) on the Ham's Fork River in southwestern Wyoming.

=== Geology and fossils ===
Kemmerer lies within the Green River Formation's Fossil Lake beds, renowned for exceptionally preserved Eocene fish and other fossils; the town's motto, "An Aquarium in Stone," reflects this heritage, and both commercial and public fossil quarries operate in the area. Fossil Butte National Monument, about 15 miles (24 km) west on U.S. Highway 30, protects part of these fossil beds.

=== Climate ===
According to the Köppen climate classification system, Kemmerer has a warm-summer humid continental climate, abbreviated "Dfb" on climate maps. The hottest temperature recorded in Kemmerer was 99 °F (37 °C) on July 12, 1990, while the coldest was −39 °F (−39 °C) on December 22, 1990.

Climate data for Kemmerer, Wyoming, 1991–2020 normals, extremes 1990–present
Month	Jan	Feb	Mar	Apr	May	Jun	Jul	Aug	Sep	Oct	Nov	Dec	Year
Record high °F (°C)	48 (9)	55 (13)	69 (21)	77 (25)	86 (30)	93 (34)	99 (37)	95 (35)	91 (33)	78 (26)	68 (20)	64 (18)	99 (37)
Mean daily maximum °F (°C)	31.0 (−0.6)	33.6 (0.9)	42.5 (5.8)	52.2 (11.2)	62.8 (17.1)	73.4 (23.0)	82.8 (28.2)	81.1 (27.3)	71.6 (22.0)	57.4 (14.1)	42.1 (5.6)	31.4 (−0.3)	55.2 (12.9)
Daily mean °F (°C)	16.6 (−8.6)	18.5 (−7.5)	27.8 (−2.3)	36.8 (2.7)	46.7 (8.2)	55.0 (12.8)	62.7 (17.1)	60.9 (16.1)	52.0 (11.1)	40.0 (4.4)	27.4 (−2.6)	17.0 (−8.3)	38.4 (3.6)
Mean daily minimum °F (°C)	2.2 (−16.6)	3.3 (−15.9)	13.2 (−10.4)	21.4 (−5.9)	30.7 (−0.7)	36.6 (2.6)	42.5 (5.8)	40.7 (4.8)	32.4 (0.2)	22.7 (−5.2)	12.7 (−10.7)	2.7 (−16.3)	21.8 (−5.7)
Record low °F (°C)	−30 (−34)	−31 (−35)	−25 (−32)	−7 (−22)	11 (−12)	19 (−7)	28 (−2)	21 (−6)	17 (−8)	−19 (−28)	−25 (−32)	−39 (−39)	−39 (−39)
Average precipitation inches (mm)	0.69 (18)	0.60 (15)	0.65 (17)	0.66 (17)	1.38 (35)	0.94 (24)	0.50 (13)	0.86 (22)	0.97 (25)	0.84 (21)	0.65 (17)	0.67 (17)	9.41 (241)
Average snowfall inches (cm)	11.6 (29)	9.6 (24)	6.1 (15)	3.0 (7.6)	1.4 (3.6)	0.1 (0.25)	0.0 (0.0)	0.0 (0.0)	0.4 (1.0)	1.8 (4.6)	6.2 (16)	9.5 (24)	49.7 (125.05)
Average precipitation days (≥ 0.01 in)	4.9	4.2	4.2	4.4	5.5	4.0	3.2	3.5	4.3	4.3	4.5	5.5	52.5
Source: NOAA

== Demographics ==
As of the 2020 census, Kemmerer had a population of 2,415 and 986 households, of which 656 were families. The median age was 39.9 years; 27.5% of residents were under 18 and 17.7% were 65 or older. The average household size was 2.1 and the average family size 3.3. The racial makeup was 91.4% White, 0.1% Black or African American, 0.8% American Indian and Alaska Native, 0.7% Asian, 1.6% some other race, and 5.4% two or more races; Hispanic or Latino residents of any race were 5.5% of the population.

At the 2010 census there were 2,656 people, 1,078 households, and 704 families in the city. The population density was 340.5 inhabitants per square mile (131.5/km^{2}). The racial makeup was 93.2% White, 0.2% African American, 1.2% Native American, 0.4% Asian, 3.9% from other races, and 1.0% from two or more races; Hispanic or Latino residents were 7.8% of the population. The median age was 38.2 years.

== Economy ==
The Naughton Power Plant, a coal- and gas-fired station on the southwest edge of Kemmerer, was long a mainstay of the local economy; its coal-fired units were scheduled to stop burning coal in 2026, with natural-gas operation continuing into the 2030s.

In November 2021, TerraPower—the advanced-nuclear company founded by Bill Gates—selected Kemmerer as the site for the first Natrium power plant, a 345-MWe sodium-cooled fast reactor paired with a molten-salt energy-storage system that can raise output to 500 MWe. The project, developed with the U.S. Department of Energy under its Advanced Reactor Demonstration Program and estimated to cost up to $4 billion, was sited near the retiring Naughton plant partly to re-employ its workers. TerraPower broke ground on non-nuclear site work in June 2024, and the Nuclear Regulatory Commission (NRC) docketed its construction-permit application the same year. On March 4, 2026, the NRC issued the construction permit—the first ever granted for a commercial non-light-water power reactor and the agency's first commercial reactor construction approval in nearly a decade—and TerraPower began nuclear construction on Kemmerer Power Station Unit 1 on April 23, 2026, describing it as the first utility-scale advanced nuclear plant to enter construction in the United States. A separate operating license is required before the reactor can run.

== Historic sites ==
On April 14, 1902, James Cash Penney opened his first store called Golden Rule Store in a city in Wyoming called Kemmerer, living with his wife in the garret above it; the store grew into the J. C. Penney department-store chain. The store known today as the "Mother Store" has operated on the town's central "Triangle" since 1902, and the J. C. Penney Historic District—comprising the store and Penney's house—was designated a National Historic Landmark in 1978. Local history, including the coal-mining past and the 1923 disaster, is preserved at the Fossil Country Frontier Museum.

== Education ==
Kemmerer is served by Lincoln County School District Number 1, which includes Canyon Elementary School, New Frontier High School, and Kemmerer High School. The city also has a public library, a branch of the Lincoln County Library System.

== Notable people ==
- John Buck (born 1980), former MLB catcher
- Jerry Buss (1933–2013), owner of the Los Angeles Lakers, lived in Kemmerer as a teenager
- William L. Carlisle (1890–1964), train robber, lived in Kemmerer
- Mollie Hemingway (born c. 1974), journalist, raised in Kemmerer
- Edgar Herschler (1918–1990), governor of Wyoming from 1975 to 1987
- James Cash Penney (1875–1971), founder of the J. C. Penney chain of stores
- Nancy F. Peternal, state legislator
