= Elections in Wyoming =

United States presidential election results for Wyoming
Year	Republican		Democratic		Third party(ies)	
Year	No.	%	No.	%	No.	%
1892	8,454	50.52%	0	0.00%	8,281	49.48%
1896	10,072	47.75%	10,861	51.49%	159	0.75%
1900	14,482	58.66%	10,164	41.17%	41	0.17%
1904	20,489	66.72%	8,930	29.08%	1,289	4.20%
1908	20,846	55.43%	14,918	39.67%	1,845	4.91%
1912	14,560	34.42%	15,310	36.20%	12,426	29.38%
1916	21,698	41.86%	28,316	54.62%	1,826	3.52%
1920	35,091	64.15%	17,429	31.86%	2,180	3.99%
1924	41,858	52.39%	12,868	16.11%	25,174	31.51%
1928	52,748	63.68%	29,299	35.37%	788	0.95%
1932	39,583	40.82%	54,370	56.07%	3,009	3.10%
1936	38,739	37.47%	62,624	60.58%	2,019	1.95%
1940	52,633	46.89%	59,287	52.82%	320	0.29%
1944	51,921	51.23%	49,419	48.77%	0	0.00%
1948	47,947	47.27%	52,354	51.62%	1,124	1.11%
1952	81,047	62.71%	47,934	37.09%	270	0.21%
1956	74,573	60.08%	49,554	39.92%	0	0.00%
1960	77,451	55.01%	63,331	44.99%	0	0.00%
1964	61,998	43.44%	80,718	56.56%	0	0.00%
1968	70,927	55.76%	45,173	35.51%	11,105	8.73%
1972	100,464	69.01%	44,358	30.47%	748	0.51%
1976	92,717	59.30%	62,239	39.81%	1,387	0.89%
1980	110,700	62.64%	49,427	27.97%	16,586	9.39%
1984	133,241	70.51%	53,370	28.24%	2,357	1.25%
1988	106,867	60.53%	67,113	38.01%	2,571	1.46%
1992	79,347	39.55%	68,160	33.97%	53,118	26.48%
1996	105,388	49.81%	77,934	36.84%	28,249	13.35%
2000	147,947	67.76%	60,481	27.70%	9,923	4.54%
2004	167,629	68.86%	70,776	29.07%	5,023	2.06%
2008	164,958	64.78%	82,868	32.54%	6,832	2.68%
2012	170,962	68.64%	69,286	27.82%	8,813	3.54%
2016	174,419	68.17%	55,973	21.88%	25,457	9.95%
2020	193,559	69.94%	73,491	26.55%	9,715	3.51%
2024	192,633	71.60%	69,527	25.84%	6,888	2.56%

The U.S. state of Wyoming is known for its reliably conservative politics and heavy support for the Republican Party, particularly in federal elections.

On December 10, 1869, the Wyoming Territory became the first US Territory to grant women the right to vote, and on its admission to the Union on July 10, 1890, as the 44th state, Wyoming became the first state to have full voting rights for women.

Democratic voters, in the minority, are concentrated in some urban areas, as well as in Teton County. Despite the imbalance in registration, Wyoming voters have elected relatively conservative Democrats to local, state and federal offices such as the state's 31st governor, Dave Freudenthal.

In a 2020 study, Wyoming was ranked as the 25th-hardest state for citizens to vote in.

== Presidential ==
- 2024 United States presidential election in Wyoming
- United States presidential election in Wyoming, 2020
- United States presidential election in Wyoming, 2016
- United States presidential election in Wyoming, 2012
- United States presidential election in Wyoming, 2008
- United States presidential election in Wyoming, 2004
- United States presidential election in Wyoming, 2000
- United States presidential election in Wyoming, 1996
- United States presidential election in Wyoming, 1992
- United States presidential election in Wyoming, 1988
- United States presidential election in Wyoming, 1984
- United States presidential election in Wyoming, 1980
- United States presidential election in Wyoming, 1976
- United States presidential election in Wyoming, 1972
- United States presidential election in Wyoming, 1968
- United States presidential election in Wyoming, 1964
- United States presidential election in Wyoming, 1960
- United States presidential election in Wyoming, 1956
- United States presidential election in Wyoming, 1952
- United States presidential election in Wyoming, 1948
- United States presidential election in Wyoming, 1944
- United States presidential election in Wyoming, 1940
- United States presidential election in Wyoming, 1936
- United States presidential election in Wyoming, 1932
- United States presidential election in Wyoming, 1928
- United States presidential election in Wyoming, 1924
- United States presidential election in Wyoming, 1920
- United States presidential election in Wyoming, 1916
- United States presidential election in Wyoming, 1912
- United States presidential election in Wyoming, 1908
- United States presidential election in Wyoming, 1904
- United States presidential election in Wyoming, 1900
- United States presidential election in Wyoming, 1896
- United States presidential election in Wyoming, 1892

== National legislative ==
- United States Senate election in Wyoming, 2020
- United States House of Representatives election in Wyoming, 2020
- United States House of Representatives election in Wyoming, 2016
- United States Senate election in Wyoming, 2014
- United States House of Representatives election in Wyoming, 2014
- United States Senate election in Wyoming, 2012
- United States House of Representatives election in Wyoming, 2012
- United States House of Representatives election in Wyoming, 2010
- United States Senate election in Wyoming, 2008
- United States House of Representatives election in Wyoming, 2008
- United States Senate election in Wyoming, 2006
- United States House of Representatives election in Wyoming, 2006
- United States House of Representatives election in Wyoming, 2004
- United States Senate election in Wyoming, 2002
- United States House of Representatives election in Wyoming, 2002
- United States Senate election in Wyoming, 2000
- United States House of Representatives election in Wyoming, 2000
- United States House of Representatives election in Wyoming, 1998
- United States Senate election in Wyoming, 1996
- United States House of Representatives election in Wyoming, 1996
- United States Senate election in Wyoming, 1994
- United States House of Representatives election in Wyoming, 1994
- United States House of Representatives election in Wyoming, 1992
- United States Senate election in Wyoming, 1988
- United States Senate election in Wyoming, 1976
- United States Senate election in Wyoming, 1970

== State executive ==
- Wyoming gubernatorial election, 2022
- Wyoming gubernatorial election, 2018
- Wyoming gubernatorial election, 2014
- Wyoming gubernatorial election, 2010
- Wyoming gubernatorial election, 2006
- Wyoming gubernatorial election, 2002
- Wyoming gubernatorial election, 1998
- Wyoming gubernatorial election, 1994
- Wyoming gubernatorial election, 1990
- Wyoming gubernatorial election, 1986
- Wyoming gubernatorial election, 1982
- Wyoming gubernatorial election, 1978
- Wyoming gubernatorial election, 1974
- Wyoming gubernatorial election, 1970
- Wyoming gubernatorial election, 1966
- Wyoming gubernatorial election, 1962
- Wyoming gubernatorial election, 1958
- Wyoming gubernatorial election, 1954
- Wyoming gubernatorial election, 1950
- Wyoming gubernatorial election, 1946
- Wyoming gubernatorial election, 1942
- Wyoming gubernatorial election, 1938
- Wyoming gubernatorial election, 1934
- Wyoming gubernatorial election, 1930
- Wyoming gubernatorial election, 1926
- Wyoming gubernatorial special election, 1924
- Wyoming gubernatorial election, 1922
- Wyoming gubernatorial election, 1918
- Wyoming gubernatorial election, 1914
- Wyoming gubernatorial election, 1910
- Wyoming gubernatorial election, 1906
- Wyoming gubernatorial special election, 1904
- Wyoming gubernatorial election, 1902
- Wyoming gubernatorial election, 1898
- Wyoming gubernatorial election, 1894
- Wyoming gubernatorial election, 1892
- Wyoming gubernatorial election, 1890

== Ballot measures ==
- List of Wyoming ballot measures

== See also ==
- Political party strength in Wyoming
- Women's suffrage in Wyoming
