= Wyoming Highway 530 =

State highway in Sweetwater County, Wyoming, United States

Wyoming Highway 530
- West Flaming Gorge Road
- WYO 530 highlighted in red

Route information
- Maintained by WYDOT
- Length: 44.788 mi (72.079 km)

Major junctions
- South end: SR-43 at Wyoming-Utah state line at Washam
- North end: I-80 BL / US 30 Bus. in Green River

Location
- Country: United States
- State: Wyoming
- Counties: Sweetwater

Highway system
- Wyoming State Highway System; Interstate; US; State
← WYO 520	→ WYO 585

Wyoming Highway 530 (WYO 530), also known as West Flaming Gorge Road, is a 44.788-mile (72.079 km) north-south state highway in southwestern Sweetwater County, Wyoming, United States. It runs along the west side of the Green River and Flaming Gorge Reservoir and connects Utah State Route 43 (SR-43) at the Utah state line (on the southeastern corner of Washam) with Interstate 80 Business / U.S. Route 30 Business (I-80 BL / US 30 Bus.) in Green River.

== Route description ==
WYO 530 begins at the Wyoming-Utah state line at the north end of SR-43 on the southeast corner of the census-designated place of Washam. (SR-43 heads west through the town of Manila and on to end at the south end of Wyoming Highway 414.) From its southern terminus, WYO 530 proceeds north, paralleling the west side of the Flaming Gorge Reservoir and Green River. For this length, the highway is known as West Flaming Gorge Road.

The Wyoming Department of Transportation (WYDOT) has invested a significant amount of time and money into improving the highway from Green River south to the border near Manila. The improved sections of WYO 530 have widened shoulders and more passing lanes, but are usually two lanes.

WYO 530 intersects no major highways along its 45-mile (72 km) route; however, it is a very scenic road, paralleling Flaming Gorge Reservoir. The reservoir is famous for its fishing, especially bass fishing, and has one of the largest shorelines in the state. It is the result of the Green River being dammed up near Dutch John, Utah.

When WYO 530 enters Green River, it becomes a five-lane highway named Uinta Avenue (two lanes each way plus a middle turn lane). In 1996, the WYO 530 bridge over the Union Pacific Railroad yards was widened from two to four lanes. On the north side of the bridge, WYO 530 comes to an end at I-80 BL / US 30 Bus. (Flaming Gorge Way).

== Major intersections ==
Actual mile markers increase from north to south.

The entire route is in Sweetwater County.

Location	mi	km	Destinations	Notes
	0.000	0.000	SR-43 west – Manila, WYO 414	Continuation west into Utah from southern terminus
	0.000	0.000	Utah-Wyoming state line (southern terminus)	
	0.580	0.933	Bridge over Henrys Fork	
			Squaw Hollow Road east	
	30.768	49.516	Bridge over Blacks Fork	
Green River	44.788	72.079	I-80 BL east / US 30 Bus. east I-80 BL east / US 30 Bus. east	Northern terminus; T intersection
1.000 mi = 1.609 km; 1.000 km = 0.621 mi

== See also ==
- List of state highways in Wyoming
- U.S. Route 191 (East Flaming Gorge Road), which parallels the east side of the Flaming Gorge Reservoir
