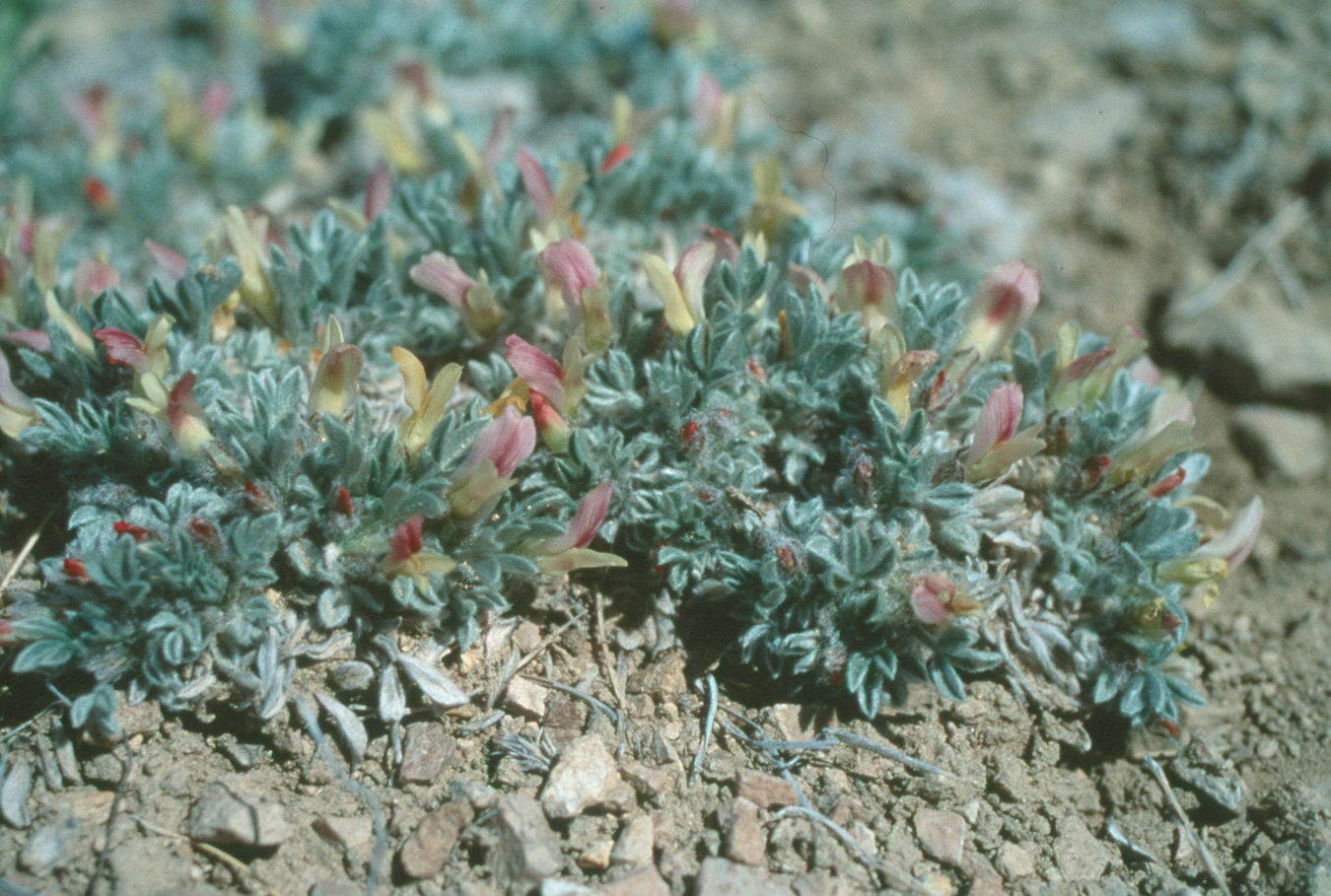

Conservation status
- Critically Imperiled (NatureServe)

Scientific classification
- Kingdom: Plantae
- Clade: Tracheophytes
- Clade: Angiosperms
- Clade: Eudicots
- Clade: Rosids
- Order: Fabales
- Family: Fabaceae
- Subfamily: Faboideae
- Genus: Astragalus
- Species: A. proimanthus

Binomial name
- Astragalus proimanthus Barneby

= Astragalus proimanthus =

Species of legume

Astragalus proimanthus is a species of flowering plant in the legume family known by the common name precocious milkvetch. It is a narrow endemic, occurring in an area of less than 320 acres near the town of McKinnon in southwestern Sweetwater County, Wyoming. It has four known populations, including one large population of more than 20,000 individuals, and is classified by NatureServe as G1 (critically imperiled) "because of extreme rarity".

== Description ==
Astragalus proimanthus is a stemless perennial forb with densely-clustered leaves consisting of three narrowly oblanceolate to elliptic leaflets. It grows in low cushions of 20–30 cm in diameter. The foliage is silvery-whitish with ascending, twisted or spreading hairs. The flowers are yellow or whitish, sessile, pea-like and up to 17 mm long.

== Habitat ==
Astragalus proimanthus grows in sparsely-vegetated areas among cushion plant/bunchgrass communities, in the dry, thin, rocky clay soils of benches and bluffs at elevations of 6400–7200 feet

== Conservation status ==
Astragalus proimanthus was previously a Category 2 (C2) candidate for listing under the Endangered Species Act, but following the elimination of the C2 program, it currently has no protection status under the Act. NatureServe has classified the species as G1, indicating that it is "critically imperiled because of extreme rarity."
