= Thayer Junction, Wyoming =

Thayer Junction
- Unincorporated community
- Location within the state of Wyoming Thayer Junction (the United States)
- Coordinates: 41°41′13″N 108°54′40″W
- Country: United States
- State: Wyoming
- County: Sweetwater
- Elevation: 6,441 ft (1,963 m)
- Time zone: UTC-7 (Mountain (MST))
  - Summer (DST): UTC-6 (MDT)
- GNIS feature ID: 1597519

Thayer Junction is an unincorporated community in Sweetwater County, in the U.S. state of Wyoming.
