= Granger Stage Station State Historic Site =

- Granger Station
- U.S. National Register of Historic Places
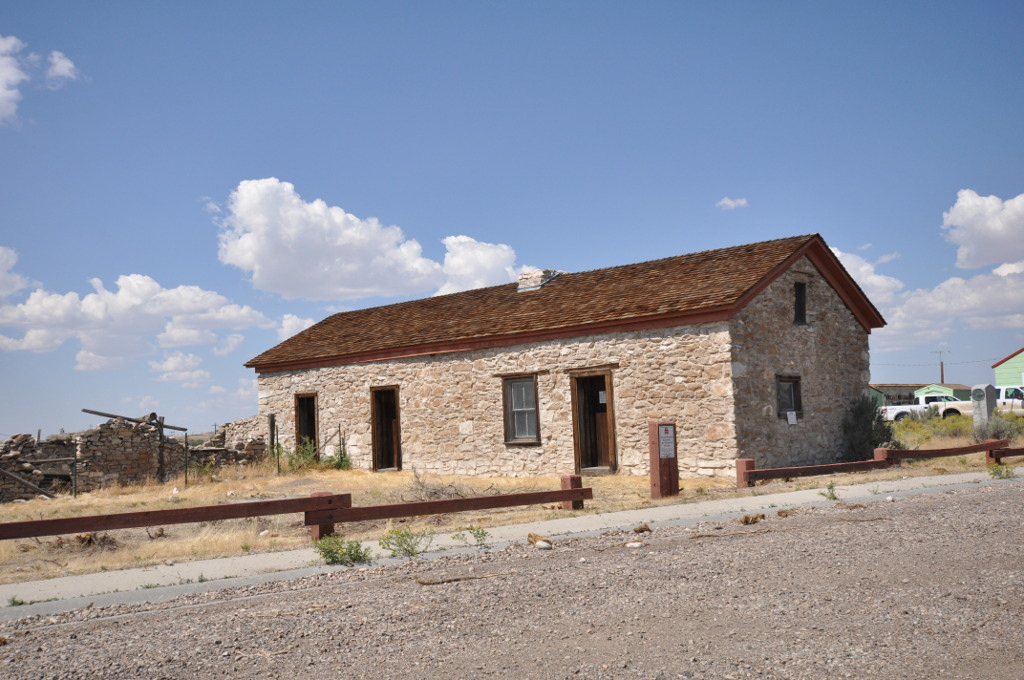
- Granger Stage Station, August 2017

- Location within Wyoming Location within the United States
- Location: Granger, Wyoming; United States
- Coordinates: 41°35′25″N 109°58′8″W
- Area: 1 acre (0.40 ha)
- Built: 1856
- NRHP reference No.: 70000678
- Added to NRHP: February 26, 1970

Granger Station State Historic Site, also known as Granger Stage Station, South Bend Station and Ham's Fork Station, is a state park in Granger, Wyoming, United States, that is listed on the National Register of Historic Places (NRHP).

== Description ==
The site is dedicated to the interpretation of the station, the Pony Express and the Overland Trail. The station is a rectangular one-story stone building measuring about 56 feet (17 m) by 22 feet (6.7 m). There are two interior rooms.

== History ==
A settlement was first established about 1856 at the meeting of Hams Fork with Blacks Fork of the Green River, where a ferry crossed Hams Fork. This became a station on the Pony Express in 1860-1861, then was a station on the Overland Trail in 1862. By this time it was known as the South Bend Station. In 1868 the trail was superseded when the Union Pacific Railroad arrived at the site. The station was deeded to the State of Wyoming in 1930. It is operated as a state historic site. The site is where the east-west Overland Trail joins the Oregon Trail coming down from the north. The Granger Station was placed on the National Register of Historic Places on February 26, 1970.

The site was added to the NRHP February 26, 1970.

== See also ==
- List of Wyoming state parks
- National Register of Historic Places listings in Sweetwater County, Wyoming
- Wyoming Historical Landmarks
- List of the oldest buildings in Wyoming
- Lone Tree Swing Station Site Overland stop before Granger Stage Station
- Fort Bridger next major stop along the trail west
