= Bryan, Wyoming =

Ghost town in Wyoming, United States

Coordinates: 41°34′14″N 109°40′53″W

Bryan is a ghost town in Sweetwater County in the U.S. state of Wyoming. Bryan is located approximately 12 miles (19 km) west of Green River along the Blacks Fork River, and for a short time was the local headquarters and division point of the Union Pacific Railroad. Today, only a few concrete foundations remain.

== History ==
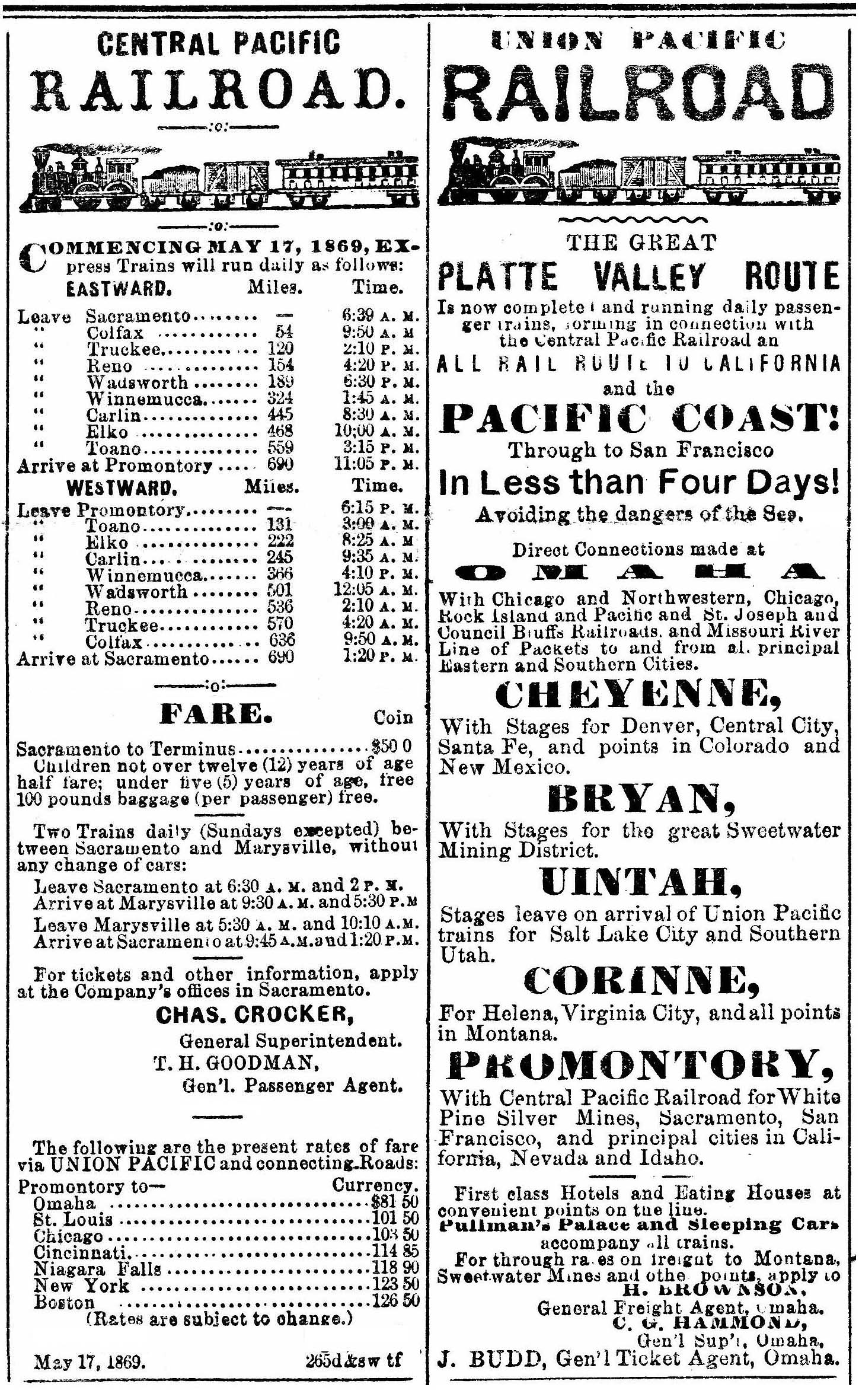
Union Pacific advertisement promoting connections out of Bryan, Wyoming

As with other cities in Wyoming, squatters rushed to occupy land in Green River City, in anticipation of the arrival of the transcontinental railroad, in 1868. Unwilling to negotiate with the squatters, the railroad instead laid out a new town to the west of Green River, along the Blacks Fork River, and established it as the local headquarters of the railroad. Stage service was established between Bryan and Green River and from there connecting to mines and towns throughout Wyoming.

Once passed over for the headquarters, the population in Green River dropped rapidly. Several years later, Blacks Fork dried up due to a drought and the railroad was concerned that there was not enough water in Bryan to service the locomotives. The railroad was able to acquire enough land to move the headquarters to Green River and completely abandoned Bryan. Green River thrived, but Bryan's population plummeted and never recovered.
