= Dines, Wyoming =

Ghost town in Wyoming, United States

Coordinates: 41°43′34″N 109°10′21″W

Dines is an extinct town in Sweetwater County, Wyoming, United States.

A post office called Dines was established in 1919, and remained in operation until 1955. The community has the name of one Mr. Dines, a businessperson in the local mining industry.
