= Northeastern Utah Educational Services =

Northeastern Utah Educational Services (NUES) is one of four regional service centers in Utah, United States, established to provide equitable and cost-effective services to nine rural school districts, to match those offered to students on Utah’s urban Wasatch Front.

The NU Center is located in Heber City, Utah, and serves the following school districts:

- Daggett School District
- Duchesne School District
- Morgan School District
- North Summit School District
- Park City School District
- Rich School District
- South Summit School District
- Uintah School District
- Wasatch County School District

Services to the districts include technology support, special education and psychological services, and a purchasing cooperative.

Its sister rural service centers in Utah are Central Utah Educational Services (CUES), Southeastern Educational Service Center (SESC), and Southwestern Educational Development Center (SEDC).
