= Daggett School District =

School district in Utah, United States

Address
- 196 W 200 N PO Box 249 Manila, Utah, 84046; United States

District information
- Type: Public
- Grades: PK - 12
- Superintendent: E. Bruce Northcott
- Governing agency: Utah State Board of Education
- Schools: 2 elementary schools; 1 high school
- NCES District ID: 4900180

Students and staff
- Students: 181
- Teachers: 16

Other information
- Website: www.dsdf.org

Daggett School District is a public school district in Daggett County, Utah, United States. The district provides education for students living in Daggett County, as well as more than two dozen students from adjacent areas in Wyoming. (Note: Due to the remote and rural locale, about 15 percent of Daggett School District's enrollment is students living in adjacent Sweetwater County, Wyoming, with several more students from Uinta County, Wyoming as well.) It is the smallest of the 41 school districts in Utah, with a total of three schools and 181 students.

== Description ==
Daggett School District operates shelter Pre-K programs (for students age 3–5 who qualify for an Individualized Education Program (IEP) at each elementary school.

The district hosts a remote site of Utah State University's Distance Education system, which provides concurrent (dual) enrollment for high school students as well as post-secondary courses for adults. Uintah Basin Technical College also offers limited courses at Manila High School.

The superintendent of the district is Dr. Bruce Northcott. The business manager is Melissa Butler. School board members include Chelsy Lail (President), Sarah Wilson (Vice President), Rob Gahley, Charles Card, and Ross Catron. Board members are elected for a term of four years, from precincts established by the county commission.

== History ==
Daggett School District, originally called Daggett County School District, was formed when Daggett County split from Uintah County, Utah in 1914. The split was necessary as Utah State law requires each county to have at least one school district.

== Communities served ==
The district boundary is also the boundary of Daggett County.

In addition to several remote areas in Daggett County (as well as some areas of Sweetwater and Uinta counties in Wyoming), Daggett School District serves the following communities:

- Dutch John
- Manila

DSD, which has an agreement with the Sweetwater County School District Number 2, stated that "DSD schools are the home school for all students living in Washam, Wyoming." Additionally, students from McKinnon, Wyoming may attend DSD schools.

== Schools ==
School name	City/town	Grade level	# of students	Student/teacher ratio	Principal
Flaming Gorge Elementary School	Dutch John	PK-5	24	12.5	Mindy Terry
Manila Elementary School	Manila	PK-6	77	20.8	Kali Briggs
Manila High School	Manila	7-12	89	8.1	Camille Browning

== See also ==
- List of school districts in Utah
- Northeastern Utah Educational Services
