= Weston County, Wyoming =

County in Wyoming, United States

- County
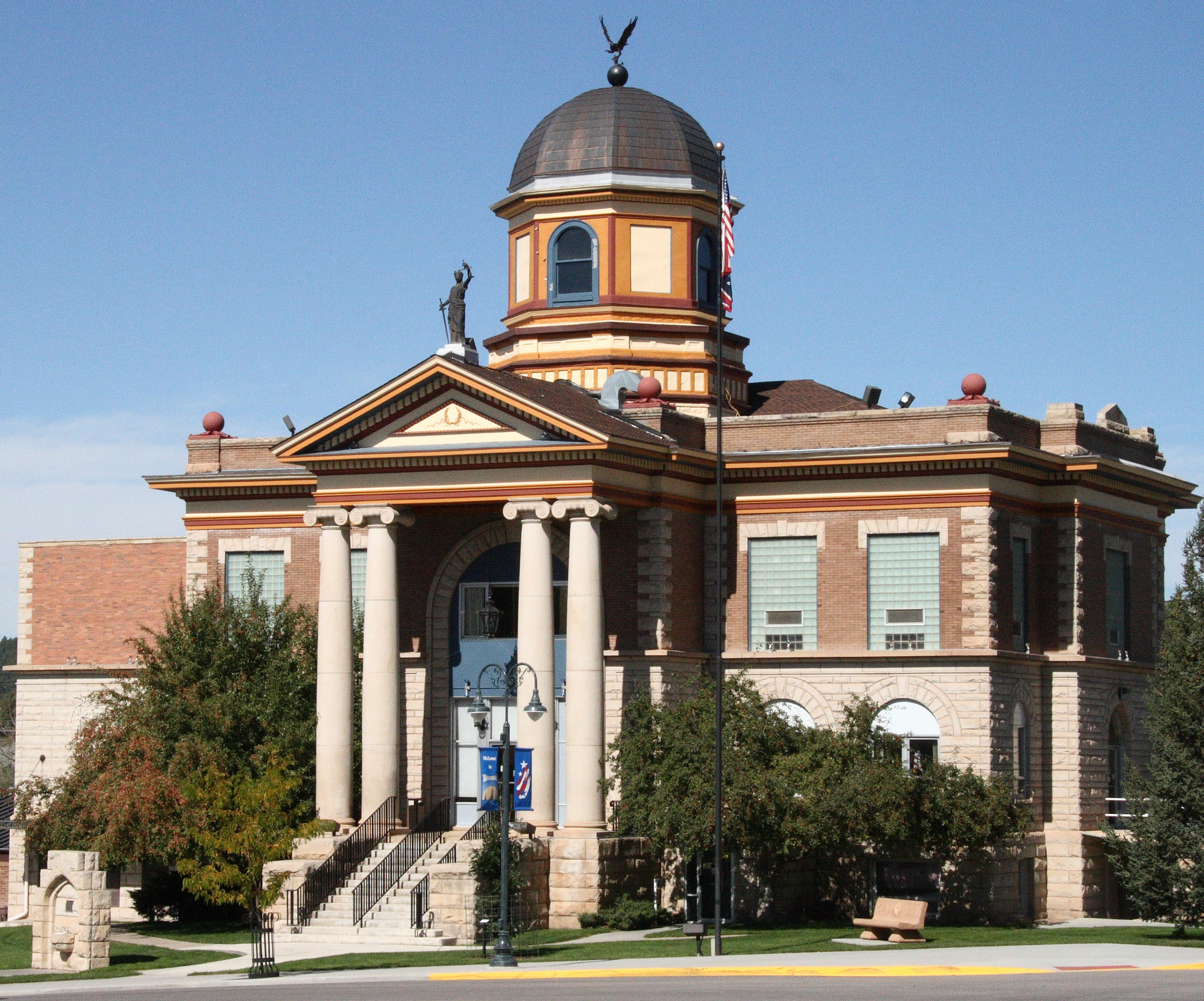
- Weston County Courthouse in Newcastle

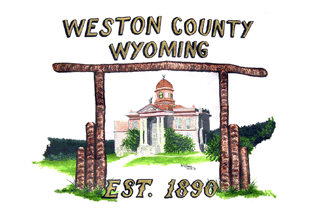
- Flag

- Location within the U.S. state of Wyoming
- Coordinates: 43°50′N 104°34′W
- Country: United States
- State: Wyoming
- Founded: March 12, 1890
- Named for: Jefferson B. Weston
- Seat: Newcastle
- Largest city: Newcastle

Area
  - Total: 2,400 sq mi (6,216 km^{2})
  - Land: 2,398 sq mi (6,211 km^{2})
  - Water: 1.9 sq mi (4.9 km^{2}) 0.08%

Population (2020)
  - Total: 6,838
  - Estimate (2025): 6,840 ▲
  - Density: 2.851/sq mi (1.101/km^{2})
- Time zone: UTC−7 (Mountain)
  - Summer (DST): UTC−6 (MDT)
- Congressional district: At-large
- Website: westongov.com

Weston County is a county in the U.S. state of Wyoming. As of the 2020 United States census, the population was 6,838. Its county seat is Newcastle. Its east boundary line abuts the western boundary of the state of South Dakota.

== History ==
Weston County was created by the legislature of the Wyoming Territory on March 12, 1890, of land partitioned from Crook County.

Weston County was named for John Weston, a geologist and surveyor. In 1887, Jefferson Weston and Frank Mondell found rich coal deposits north of Newcastle which caused a railroad to be built through the area.

In 1911, Campbell County was formed from portions of Weston County and Crook County. Since then, the boundaries of Weston County have been stable.

== Geography ==
According to the US Census Bureau, the county has a total area of 2,400 square miles (6,200 km^{2}), of which 2,398 square miles (6,210 km^{2}) is land and 1.9 square miles (4.9 km^{2}) (0.08%) is water.

=== Adjacent counties ===
- Crook County – north
- Lawrence County, South Dakota – northeast
- Pennington County, South Dakota – east
- Custer County, South Dakota – southeast
- Niobrara County – south
- Converse County – southwest
- Campbell County – west

=== Major highways ===
- U.S. Highway 16
- U.S. Highway 20
- U.S. Highway 85
- Wyoming Highway 116
- Wyoming Highway 450
- Wyoming Highway 585

=== National protected areas ===
- Black Hills National Forest (part)
- Thunder Basin National Grassland (part)

== Demographics ==
Historical population
Census	Pop.	Note	%±
1890	2,422		—
1900	3,203		32.2%
1910	4,960		54.9%
1920	4,631		−6.6%
1930	4,673		0.9%
1940	4,958		6.1%
1950	6,733		35.8%
1960	7,929		17.8%
1970	6,307		−20.5%
1980	7,106		12.7%
1990	6,518		−8.3%
2000	6,644		1.9%
2010	7,208		8.5%
2020	6,838		−5.1%
2025 (est.)	6,840	▲	0.0%
US Decennial Census; 1870–2000 2010

=== 2020 census ===
As of the 2020 census, the county had a population of 6,838. Of the residents, 21.2% were under the age of 18 and 22.2% were 65 years of age or older; the median age was 45.3 years. For every 100 females there were 116.7 males, and for every 100 females age 18 and over there were 121.5 males.

Weston County, Wyoming – Racial and ethnic composition Note: the US Census treats Hispanic/Latino as an ethnic category. This table excludes Latinos from the racial categories and assigns them to a separate category. Hispanics/Latinos may be of any race.
Race / Ethnicity (NH = Non-Hispanic)	Pop 2000	Pop 2010	Pop 2020	% 2000	% 2010	% 2020
White alone (NH)	6,298	6,762	6,106	94.79%	93.81%	89.29%
Black or African American alone (NH)	8	18	28	0.12%	0.25%	0.41%
Native American or Alaska Native alone (NH)	83	86	92	1.25%	1.19%	1.35%
Asian alone (NH)	13	20	26	0.20%	0.28%	0.38%
Pacific Islander alone (NH)	1	2	9	0.02%	0.03%	0.13%
Other race alone (NH)	15	1	34	0.23%	0.01%	0.50%
Mixed race or Multiracial (NH)	89	103	248	1.34%	1.43%	3.63%
Hispanic or Latino (any race)	137	216	295	2.06%	3.00%	4.31%
Total	6,644	7,208	6,838	100.00%	100.00%	100.00%

The racial makeup of the county was 90.6% White, 0.4% Black or African American, 1.4% American Indian and Alaska Native, 0.4% Asian, 2.0% from some other race, and 5.0% from two or more races. Hispanic or Latino residents of any race comprised 4.3% of the population.

There were 2,796 households in the county, of which 25.1% had children under the age of 18 living with them and 21.7% had a female householder with no spouse or partner present. About 31.4% of all households were made up of individuals and 15.1% had someone living alone who was 65 years of age or older.

There were 3,406 housing units, of which 17.9% were vacant. Among occupied housing units, 78.8% were owner-occupied and 21.2% were renter-occupied. The homeowner vacancy rate was 3.2% and the rental vacancy rate was 18.1%.

=== 2010 census ===
As of the 2010 United States census, there were 7,208 people, 3,021 households, and 1,957 families in the county. The population density was 3.0 people per square mile (1.2 people/km^{2}). There were 3,533 housing units at an average density of 1.5 units per square mile (0.58 units/km^{2}). The racial makeup of the county was 95.5% white, 1.3% American Indian, 0.3% black or African American, 0.3% Asian, 0.9% from other races, and 1.7% from two or more races. Those of Hispanic or Latino origin made up 3.0% of the population. In terms of ancestry, 31.7% were German, 19.3% were Irish, 18.5% were English, 6.6% were Norwegian, 6.1% were Swedish, and 5.6% were American.

Of the 3,021 households, 26.1% had children under the age of 18 living with them, 53.2% were married couples living together, 6.9% had a female householder with no husband present, 35.2% were non-families, and 29.9% of all households were made up of individuals. The average household size was 2.28 and the average family size was 2.81. The median age was 42.3 years.

The median income for a household in the county was $53,853 and the median income for a family was $63,438. Males had a median income of $53,095 versus $28,724 for females. The per capita income for the county was $28,463. About 5.8% of families and 7.9% of the population were below the poverty line, including 10.1% of those under age 18 and 10.1% of those age 65 or over.

=== 2000 census ===
As of the 2000 United States census, there were 6,644 people, 2,624 households, and 1,868 families in the county. The population density was 3 people per square mile (1.2 people/km^{2}). There were 3,231 housing units at an average density of 1.3 units per square mile (0.50 units/km^{2}). The racial makeup of the county was 95.94% White, 0.12% Black or African American, 1.26% Native American, 0.20% Asian, 0.02% Pacific Islander, 0.93% from other races, and 1.54% from two or more races. 2.06% of the population were Hispanic or Latino of any race. 33.0% were of German, 13.0% English, 8.9% Irish and 7.2% American ancestry.

There were 2,624 households, out of which 31.10% had children under the age of 18 living with them, 60.40% were married couples living together, 7.30% had a female householder with no husband present, and 28.80% were non-families. 25.00% of all households were made up of individuals, and 11.50% had someone living alone who was 65 years of age or older. The average household size was 2.42 and the average family size was 2.88.

The county population contained 24.10% under the age of 18, 7.40% from 18 to 24, 26.30% from 25 to 44, 26.70% from 45 to 64, and 15.60% who were 65 years of age or older. The median age was 41 years. For every 100 females there were 103.10 males. For every 100 females age 18 and over, there were 103.80 males.

The median income for a household in the county was $32,348, and the median income for a family was $40,472. Males had a median income of $34,321 versus $18,640 for females. The per capita income for the county was $17,366. About 6.30% of families and 9.90% of the population were below the poverty line, including 11.30% of those under age 18 and 13.60% of those age 65 or over.

== Communities ==
=== City ===
- Newcastle (county seat)

=== Town ===
- Upton

=== Census-designated places ===
- Hill View Heights
- Osage

=== Other places ===
- Buckhorn
- Clareton
- Four Corners

== Politics ==
Like all of the High Plains, and almost all of Wyoming, Weston County is overwhelmingly Republican. Since Wyoming statehood in 1890, it has been carried by a Democrat just three times. Woodrow Wilson carried the county in 1912 as a result of a split between the conservative incumbent William Howard Taft and Progressive ex-President Theodore Roosevelt, whilst in his two 1930s landslides Franklin D. Roosevelt became the other Democrat to win Weston County, although he defeated Republican Alf Landon in 1936 by just 109 votes.

Subsequent to Lyndon Johnson losing the county to Barry Goldwater by just fifty-four votes in 1964, no Democrat has passed 35 percent of Weston County's vote. Indeed, Bill Clinton in 1996 was the last Democratic to pass twenty percent.

United States presidential election results for Weston County, Wyoming
Year	Republican		Democratic		Third party(ies)	
Year	No.	%	No.	%	No.	%
1892	294	57.20%	0	0.00%	220	42.80%
1896	451	58.12%	319	41.11%	6	0.77%
1900	548	61.85%	338	38.15%	0	0.00%
1904	810	77.66%	221	21.19%	12	1.15%
1908	723	58.45%	478	38.64%	36	2.91%
1912	449	34.41%	459	35.17%	397	30.42%
1916	791	49.87%	734	46.28%	61	3.85%
1920	1,073	68.65%	463	29.62%	27	1.73%
1924	794	45.35%	317	18.10%	640	36.55%
1928	1,127	61.28%	688	37.41%	24	1.31%
1932	840	35.81%	1,459	62.19%	47	2.00%
1936	1,084	47.23%	1,193	51.98%	18	0.78%
1940	1,292	56.57%	985	43.13%	7	0.31%
1944	1,097	59.27%	754	40.73%	0	0.00%
1948	962	53.80%	822	45.97%	4	0.22%
1952	1,931	69.61%	839	30.25%	4	0.14%
1956	1,837	64.05%	1,031	35.95%	0	0.00%
1960	1,743	59.21%	1,201	40.79%	0	0.00%
1964	1,473	50.93%	1,419	49.07%	0	0.00%
1968	1,497	63.08%	610	25.71%	266	11.21%
1972	2,063	78.47%	520	19.78%	46	1.75%
1976	1,770	65.22%	934	34.41%	10	0.37%
1980	2,219	74.71%	584	19.66%	167	5.62%
1984	2,614	83.59%	482	15.41%	31	0.99%
1988	1,988	72.98%	699	25.66%	37	1.36%
1992	1,465	48.40%	727	24.02%	835	27.59%
1996	1,763	55.55%	871	27.44%	540	17.01%
2000	2,521	82.39%	449	14.67%	90	2.94%
2004	2,739	80.75%	580	17.10%	73	2.15%
2008	2,618	77.16%	658	19.39%	117	3.45%
2012	2,821	83.98%	422	12.56%	116	3.45%
2016	3,033	86.02%	299	8.48%	194	5.50%
2020	3,107	87.72%	360	10.16%	75	2.12%
2024	3,069	87.39%	378	10.76%	65	1.85%

The Wyoming Department of Corrections Wyoming Honor Conservation Camp & Boot Camp is located in Newcastle. The facility was operated by the Wyoming Board of Charities and Reform until that agency was dissolved as a result of a state constitutional amendment passed in November 1990.

== See also ==
- National Register of Historic Places listings in Weston County, Wyoming
- Wyoming
  - List of cities and towns in Wyoming
  - List of counties in Wyoming
  - Wyoming statistical areas
