= 1956 United States presidential election in Wyoming =

- November 6, 1956

All 3 Wyoming votes to the Electoral College

Nominee	Dwight D. Eisenhower	Adlai Stevenson
Party	Republican	Democratic
Home state	Pennsylvania	Illinois
Running mate	Richard Nixon	Estes Kefauver
Electoral vote	3	0
Popular vote	74,573	49,554
Percentage	60.08%	39.92%
County results
Eisenhower
50–60%
60–70%
70–80%
Stevenson
50–60%
President before election
Dwight D. Eisenhower
Republican
Elected President
Dwight D. Eisenhower
Republican

The 1956 United States presidential election in Wyoming took place on November 6, 1956, as part of the 1956 United States presidential election. State voters chose three representatives, or electors, to the Electoral College, who voted for president and vice president.

Wyoming was won by incumbent President Dwight D. Eisenhower (R–Pennsylvania), running with Vice President Richard Nixon, with 60.08 percent of the popular vote, against Adlai Stevenson (D–Illinois), running with Senator Estes Kefauver, with 39.92 percent of the popular vote, a Republican victory margin of 20.2%. This margin represented a slight decrease from Eisenhower's victory in the state 4 years earlier in 1952, despite the fact that he won nationwide by a larger margin. Nevertheless, Wyoming still weighed in as 2.8% more Republican than the rest of the nation. Ironically enough, despite his margins in most of the counties he won being slightly less than 1952.

Eisenhower's underperformance relative to 1952 was not unique to just Wyoming, as most of the Mountain West swung a few points against him. Given the fact that the state's economy relied heavily upon agriculture, this is possibly due to a 5 year long drought in the High Plains, which encompasses parts of Wyoming, Montana, Colorado, and New Mexico.

== Campaign ==
Wyoming was mostly ignored during the campaign. Estes Kefauver gave one speech in Rock Springs, Wyoming.

== Results ==
1956 United States presidential election in Wyoming
Party	Candidate	Votes	%
Republican	Dwight D. Eisenhower (inc.)	74,573	60.08%
Democratic	Adlai Stevenson	49,554	39.92%
Total votes		124,127	100.00%

=== Results by county ===
County	Dwight D. Eisenhower Republican		Adlai Stevenson Democratic		Margin		Total votes cast
County	#	%	#	%	#	%	Total votes cast
Albany	4,315	55.88%	3,407	44.12%	908	11.76%	7,722
Big Horn	3,369	65.01%	1,813	34.99%	1,556	30.02%	5,182
Campbell	1,473	69.19%	656	30.81%	817	38.38%	2,129
Carbon	3,336	50.90%	3,218	49.10%	118	1.80%	6,554
Converse	1,855	71.18%	751	28.82%	1,104	42.36%	2,606
Crook	1,139	72.78%	426	27.22%	713	45.56%	1,565
Fremont	4,887	65.54%	2,569	34.46%	2,318	31.08%	7,456
Goshen	2,825	57.01%	2,130	42.99%	695	14.02%	4,955
Hot Springs	1,663	62.99%	977	37.01%	686	25.98%	2,640
Johnson	1,842	76.12%	578	23.88%	1,264	52.24%	2,420
Laramie	10,581	53.84%	9,072	46.16%	1,509	7.68%	19,653
Lincoln	2,264	59.16%	1,563	40.84%	701	18.32%	3,827
Natrona	10,796	62.56%	6,462	37.44%	4,334	25.12%	17,258
Niobrara	1,248	70.67%	518	29.33%	730	41.34%	1,766
Park	4,397	69.17%	1,960	30.83%	2,437	38.34%	6,357
Platte	1,848	55.21%	1,499	44.79%	349	10.42%	3,347
Sheridan	5,546	63.38%	3,204	36.62%	2,342	26.76%	8,750
Sublette	901	71.96%	351	28.04%	550	43.92%	1,252
Sweetwater	3,355	41.41%	4,747	58.59%	-1,392	-17.18%	8,102
Teton	1,089	77.73%	312	22.27%	777	55.46%	1,401
Uinta	1,742	56.87%	1,321	43.13%	421	13.74%	3,063
Washakie	2,265	69.61%	989	30.39%	1,276	39.22%	3,254
Weston	1,837	64.05%	1,031	35.95%	806	28.10%	2,868
Totals	74,573	60.08%	49,554	39.92%	25,019	20.16%	124,127

== See also ==
- United States presidential elections in Wyoming

== Works cited ==
- Trachsel, Herman (1957). "The 1956 Election in Wyoming". The Western Political Quarterly. 12 (1). University of Utah: 166–68. doi:10.2307/444255. JSTOR 444255.
