= Sweetwater County School District Number 2 =

School district in Wyoming, United States

Sweetwater County School District #2 is a public school district based in Green River, Wyoming, United States.

== Geography ==
Sweetwater County School District #2 serves the southwestern portion of Sweetwater County, including the following communities:

- Incorporated places
  - Town of Granger
  - City of Green River
- Census-designated places (Note: All census-designated places are unincorporated.)
  - James Town
  - Little America
  - McKinnon
  - Sweeney Ranch (former CDP, partial)
  - Washam

There is an area that was, of the 2000 U.S. census, defined as part of the Purple Sage CDP, but not as such in the 2010 U.S. census and beyond. Part of that area lies in Sweetwater County School District Two.

Washam students, however, are sent to schools of the Daggett School District in Utah. DSD, which has an agreement with the Sweetwater District 2, stated that "DSD schools are the home school for all students living in Washam, Wyoming." Additionally, students in McKinnon may choose to attend DSD schools.

== Schools ==
- Green River Schools (within the city limits)
  - Green River High School
  - Expedition Academy
  - Lincoln Middle School
  - Monroe Intermediate School
  - Harrison Elementary School
  - Jackson Elementary School
  - Truman Elementary School
  - Washington Elementary School
- Rural Schools
  - Granger Elementary School
  - McKinnon Elementary School
  - Thoman Ranch Elementary School

== Student demographics ==
The following figures are as of October 1, 2008.

- Total District Enrollment: 2,671
- Student enrollment by gender
  - Male: 1,388 (51.97%)
  - Female: 1,283 (48.03%)
- Student enrollment by ethnicity
  - White (not Hispanic): 2,220 (83.11%)
  - Hispanic: 368 (13.78%)
  - American Indian or Alaskan Native: 35 (1.31%)
  - Asian or Pacific Islander: 30 (1.12%)
  - Black (not Hispanic): 18 (0.67%)

== See also ==
- List of school districts in Wyoming
