= Sweeney Ranch, Wyoming =

- Unincorporated community
- Location within the state of Wyoming Sweeney Ranch, Wyoming (the United States)
- Coordinates: 41°28′55″N 109°00′37″W
- Country: United States
- State: Wyoming
- County: Sweetwater

Area
  - Total: 8.1 sq mi (21.0 km^{2})
  - Land: 8.1 sq mi (21.0 km^{2})
  - Water: 0 sq mi (0.0 km^{2})
- Elevation: 6,697 ft (2,041 m)

Population (2000)
  - Total: 17
  - Density: 2.1/sq mi (0.8/km^{2})
- Time zone: UTC-7 (Mountain (MST))
  - Summer (DST): UTC-6 (MDT)
- Area code: 307
- FIPS code: 56-75137
- GNIS feature ID: 2410040

Sweeney Ranch is an unincorporated community in Sweetwater County, Wyoming, United States. The population was 17 at the 2000 census, when it was a census-designated place (CDP).

== Geography ==
According to the United States Census Bureau, in 2000 the CDP had a total area of 8.1 square miles (21.0 km^{2}), all land.

== Demographics ==
As of the census of 2000, there were 17 people, 6 households, and 4 families residing in the CDP. The population density was 2.1 people per square mile (0.8/km^{2}). There were 7 housing units at an average density of 0.9/sq mi (0.3/km^{2}). The racial makeup of the CDP was 100.00% White.

There were 6 households, out of which 33.3% had children under the age of 18 living with them, 66.7% were married couples living together, 16.7% had a female householder with no husband present, and 16.7% were non-families. 16.7% of all households were made up of individuals, and none had someone living alone who was 65 years of age or older. The average household size was 2.83 and the average family size was 3.20.

In the CDP the population was spread out, with 17.6% under the age of 18, 17.6% from 18 to 24, 11.8% from 25 to 44, 52.9% from 45 to 64, . The median age was 46 years. For every 100 females, there were 112.5 males. For every 100 females age 18 and over, there were 100.0 males.

The median income for a household in the CDP was $31,250, and the median income for a family was $0. Males had a median income of $31,250 versus $0 for females. The per capita income for the CDP was $31,000. None of the population or the families were below the poverty line.

== Education ==
Public education in the former census-designated place of Sweeney Ranch is provided by two school districts in two different portions: Sweetwater County School District #1 and Sweetwater County School District #2.
