= Rich School District (Utah) =

School district in Utah, United States

Address
- 25 South 100 West; PO Box 67 Randolph, Utah, 84064; United States

District information
- Type: Public
- Motto: Providing Quality Education for the Future
- Grades: K - 12
- Superintendent: Dale Lamborn
- Governing agency: Utah Department of Education
- Schools: 2 elementary schools; 1 middle school; 1 high school
- NCES District ID: 4900840

Students and staff
- Students: 481
- Teachers: 32

Other information
- Website: www.richschool.org

Rich School District is a school district located in Rich County in northern Utah, United States. It serves all the communities within Rich County and is the fourth smallest of the 41 school districts within the state in terms of student enrollment.

== Communities served ==
The Rich School District serves the following communities:

- Garden City
- Laketown
- Randolph
- Woodruff

== Schools ==
The following are schools within the Rich County School District:

=== Elementary schools ===
- North Rich Elementary School - Laketown
- South Rich Elementary School - Randolph

=== Middle schools ===
- Rich Middle School - Laketown

=== High schools ===
- Rich High School - Randolph

== See also ==
- List of school districts in Utah
- Northeastern Utah Educational Services
