= Washam, Wyoming =

- Census-designated place
- Location within the state of Wyoming
- Coordinates: 41°00′09″N 109°42′18″W
- Country: United States
- State: Wyoming
- County: Sweetwater

Area
  - Total: 3.1 sq mi (8.0 km^{2})
  - Land: 3.1 sq mi (8.0 km^{2})
  - Water: 0.0 sq mi (0 km^{2})
- Elevation: 6,861 ft (2,091 m)

Population (2010)
  - Total: 51
  - Density: 16/sq mi (6.4/km^{2})
- Time zone: UTC-7 (Mountain (MST))
  - Summer (DST): UTC-6 (MDT)
- Area code: 307
- FIPS code: 56-81703
- GNIS feature ID: 2409534

Washam is a census-designated place (CDP) in Sweetwater County, Wyoming, United States. The population was 51 at the 2010 census.

== Geography ==
According to the United States Census Bureau, the CDP has a total area of 3.13 square miles (8.1 km^{2}), all land.

== Demographics ==
As of the census of 2000, there were 43 people, 17 households, and 10 families residing in the CDP. The population density was 2.1 people per square mile (0.8/km^{2}). There were 49 housing units at an average density of 2.3/sq mi (0.9/km^{2}). The racial makeup of the CDP was 100.00% White.

There were 17 households, out of which 35.3% had children under the age of 18 living with them, 52.9% were married couples living together, 5.9% had a female householder with no husband present, and 35.3% were non-families. 35.3% of all households were made up of individuals, and 17.6% had someone living alone who was 65 years of age or older. The average household size was 2.53 and the average family size was 3.36.

In the CDP, the population was spread out, with 30.2% under the age of 18, 4.7% from 18 to 24, 30.2% from 25 to 44, 14.0% from 45 to 64, and 20.9% who were 65 years of age or older. The median age was 38 years. For every 100 females, there were 87.0 males. For every 100 females age 18 and over, there were 87.5 males.

The median income for a household in the CDP was $90,112, and the median income for a family was $90,112. Males had a median income of $90,957 versus $0 for females. The per capita income for the CDP was $18,583. None of the population or the families were below the poverty line.

== Education ==
Washam lies within the Sweetwater County School District #2. However, students instead attend Daggett School District (DSD) schools in nearby Utah, under a cooperative agreement. The Daggett School District stated "DSD schools are the home school for all students living in Washam, Wyoming." The nearest Wyoming schools are in McKinnon (elementary), a distance of 14 miles, and Green River (secondary), a distance of 48 miles.
