= Blacks Fork =

Blacks Fork Blacks Fork of the Green River
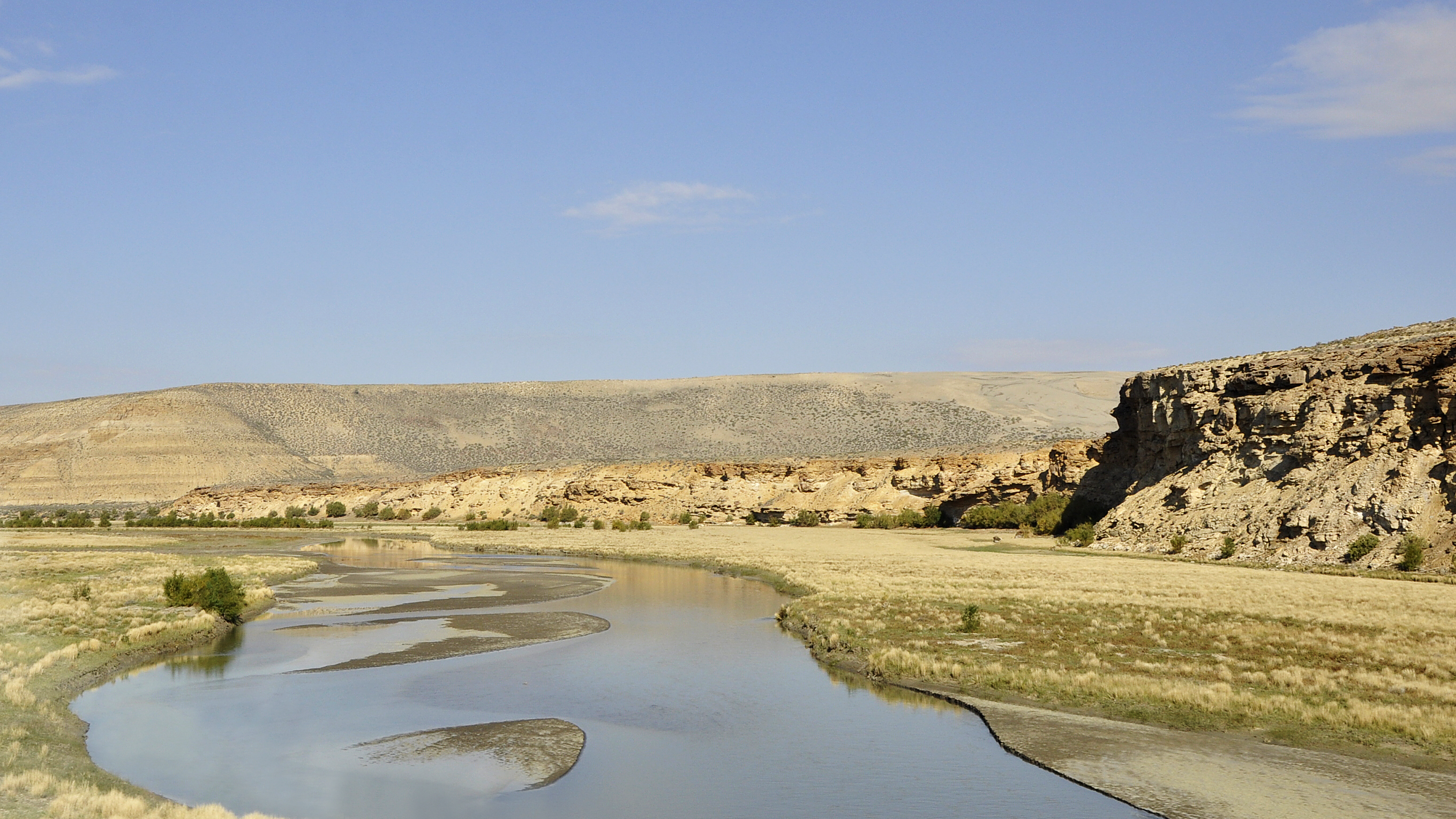

Location
- Country: United States
- State: Utah, Wyoming
- Counties: Summit, Uinta, Lincoln, Sweetwater
- Cites: Millburne, Fort Bridger, Granger

Physical characteristics
- Source
  - location: Uinta Mountains (Utah)
  - coordinates: 40°56′25″N 110°35′19″W
- Mouth: Flaming Gorge Reservoir
  - location: Wyoming
  - coordinates: 41°17′42″N 109°32′06″W
- Discharge
  - location: USGS gage #09224700 near Little America
  - average: 292 cu ft/s (8.3 m^{3}/s)
  - minimum: 0 cu ft/s (0 m^{3}/s)
  - maximum: 9,980 cu ft/s (283 m^{3}/s)

Basin features
- Tributaries
  - left: Little West Fork Blacks Fork, Hams Fork
  - right: Smiths Fork

Blacks Fork (also referred to as Blacks Fork of the Green River) is a 175-mile-long (282 km) tributary of the Green River in Utah and Wyoming in the United States.

== Description ==
The river rises on the northern side of the Uinta Mountains in the Uinta-Wasatch-Cache National Forest in Summit County, Utah, as the combination of three streams draining the area around Tokewanna Peak near the Utah–Wyoming border. Just before the river crosses into Wyoming, it flows into Meeks Cabin Reservoir, which is used for irrigation and flood control. After entering Uinta County in Wyoming and then flowing out of the reservoir, the river leaves the national forest.

It then flows northeast through unincorporated community of Millburne and along the edge of the census-designated place of Fort Bridger. Turning to a nearly eastern course, the river passes under Interstate 80 (I‑80) before joining with the Smiths Fork (possibly named for Jedediah Smith), which forms just east of the Blacks Fork in the Uinta Mountains and parallels it for most of its course. The river continues northeast, very briefly passing through the extreme southeast corner of Lincoln, Wyoming, (where it turns east) before entering Sweetwater County, Wyoming. The river then meets the Hams Fork from the north on the southwest edge of Granger.

Promptly after entering Granger, the river passes along the south edge of the Granger Stage Station and then passes under U.S. Route 30 (US 30). Shortly after that, the river makes sharp turn south (passing under I‑80/US 30) and eventually entering the Flaming Gorge National Recreation Area and joining the Green River at Flaming Gorge Reservoir

== History ==
The river is named for Arthur Black, who was trapped in the area in 1824, as an employee of the Ashley/Henry Company.

In 1843, mountain man Jim Bridger and his partner Louis Vasquez constructed a trading post on the Blacks Fork, located west of the present-day Lyman, known later as Fort Bridger. The post soon became a popular stop along the Oregon and California trails and later marked the point at which the Mormon Trail left the other two and continued into Utah.

== Climate ==
The Buck Pasture SNOTEL weather station is located near the source for the west fork of the Blacks Fork River.

Climate data for Buck Pasture, Utah, 2012–2022 normals: 9700ft (2957m)
Month	Jan	Feb	Mar	Apr	May	Jun	Jul	Aug	Sep	Oct	Nov	Dec	Year
Record high °F (°C)	57 (14)	56 (13)	59 (15)	64 (18)	68 (20)	78 (26)	78 (26)	80 (27)	78 (26)	68 (20)	60 (16)	54 (12)	80 (27)
Mean maximum °F (°C)	48.5 (9.2)	46.8 (8.2)	52.8 (11.6)	58.3 (14.6)	64.2 (17.9)	73.6 (23.1)	76.1 (24.5)	75.4 (24.1)	72.5 (22.5)	61.3 (16.3)	54.1 (12.3)	47.5 (8.6)	77.0 (25.0)
Mean daily maximum °F (°C)	33.8 (1.0)	32.9 (0.5)	40.5 (4.7)	44.4 (6.9)	51.6 (10.9)	64.0 (17.8)	69.8 (21.0)	68.0 (20.0)	61.0 (16.1)	48.6 (9.2)	39.6 (4.2)	31.0 (−0.6)	48.8 (9.3)
Daily mean °F (°C)	17.6 (−8.0)	17.6 (−8.0)	25.2 (−3.8)	29.9 (−1.2)	38.8 (3.8)	48.9 (9.4)	54.7 (12.6)	52.8 (11.6)	46.6 (8.1)	35.5 (1.9)	25.6 (−3.6)	16.9 (−8.4)	34.2 (1.2)
Mean daily minimum °F (°C)	1.3 (−17.1)	2.2 (−16.6)	9.8 (−12.3)	15.4 (−9.2)	26.1 (−3.3)	33.8 (1.0)	39.7 (4.3)	37.7 (3.2)	32.1 (0.1)	22.4 (−5.3)	11.5 (−11.4)	2.9 (−16.2)	19.6 (−6.9)
Mean minimum °F (°C)	−23.0 (−30.6)	−24.5 (−31.4)	−14.8 (−26.0)	−5.8 (−21.0)	9.5 (−12.5)	22.9 (−5.1)	31.5 (−0.3)	30.5 (−0.8)	18.7 (−7.4)	0.5 (−17.5)	−12.4 (−24.7)	−22.8 (−30.4)	−29.4 (−34.1)
Record low °F (°C)	−35 (−37)	−31 (−35)	−22 (−30)	−17 (−27)	−6 (−21)	17 (−8)	25 (−4)	27 (−3)	11 (−12)	−21 (−29)	−29 (−34)	−33 (−36)	−35 (−37)
Average precipitation inches (mm)	2.71 (69)	2.78 (71)	2.84 (72)	3.58 (91)	2.85 (72)	1.50 (38)	1.62 (41)	2.06 (52)	2.31 (59)	2.68 (68)	2.95 (75)	2.85 (72)	30.73 (780)
Source 1: XMACIS2
Source 2: NOAA (Precipitation)

== See also ==
- List of rivers of Utah
- List of Wyoming rivers
- List of tributaries of the Colorado River
