= 1968 United States presidential election in Wyoming =

- November 5, 1968

| Nominee | Richard Nixon | Hubert Humphrey | George Wallace |
| Party | Republican | Democratic | Independent |
| Alliance | | | American Independent |
| Home state | New York (Note: Although he was born in California and he served as a U.S. senator from California, in 1968 Richard Nixon's official state of residence was New York, because he moved there to practice law after his defeat in the 1962 California gubernatorial election. During his first term as president, Nixon re-established his residency in California. Consequently, most reliable reference books list Nixon's home state as New York in the 1968 election and his home state as California in the 1972 and 1960 election.) | Minnesota | Alabama |
| Running mate | Spiro Agnew | Edmund Muskie | Marvin Griffin |
| Electoral vote | 3 | 0 | 0 |
| Popular vote | 70,927 | 45,173 | 11,105 |
| Percentage | 55.76% | 35.51% | 8.73% |
County results
Nixon
40–50%
50–60%
60–70%
70–80%
Humphrey
40–50%
50–60%
President before election
Lyndon B. Johnson
Democratic
Elected President
Richard Nixon
Republican

The 1968 United States presidential election in Wyoming took place on November 5, 1968. All 50 states and the District of Columbia were part of the 1968 United States presidential election. State voters chose three electors to the Electoral College, who voted for president and vice president.

Wyoming was won by the Republican nominee, former vice president Richard Nixon, running with Governor of Maryland Spiro Agnew. Together they defeated the Democratic nominee, incumbent Vice President Hubert Humphrey, and his running mate, Senator Edmund Muskie from Maine.

Nixon carried Wyoming with 55.76% of the vote to Humphrey's 35.51%, a victory margin of 20.25%. This marked a 33.45% swing to the right from 1964, when the state had voted for Democrat Lyndon B. Johnson by 13.2%. Also on the ballot was former and future Alabama Governor George Wallace, running as an Independent in Wyoming. Although Wallace carried five states in the South, he had only modest appeal in Wyoming. His performance was the best by any third-party candidate in Wyoming since Robert La Follette won nearly a third of the vote in 1924, but nonetheless did not equal his vote share in the fellow Western states of Alaska, Idaho and Nevada.

With 55.76 percent of the popular vote, Wyoming would prove to be Nixon's fifth strongest state in the 1968 election after Nebraska, Idaho, Utah and North Dakota.

== Results ==
1968 United States presidential election in Wyoming
| Party | Candidate | Votes | % |
|---|---|---|---|
| Republican | Richard Nixon | 70,927 | 55.76% |
| Democratic | Hubert Humphrey | 45,173 | 35.51% |
| Independent | George Wallace | 11,105 | 8.73% |
| Total votes | | 127,205 | 100.00% |

=== Results by county ===
| County | Richard Nixon Republican | | Hubert Humphrey Democratic | | George Wallace Independent | | Margin | | Total votes cast |
| County | # | % | # | % | # | % | # | % | Total votes cast |
|---|---|---|---|---|---|---|---|---|---|
| Albany | 4,422 | 48.71% | 4,079 | 44.93% | 578 | 6.37% | 343 | 3.78% | 9,079 |
| Big Horn | 2,771 | 64.07% | 1,201 | 27.77% | 353 | 8.16% | 1,570 | 36.30% | 4,325 |
| Campbell | 1,694 | 66.67% | 558 | 21.96% | 289 | 11.37% | 1,136 | 44.71% | 2,541 |
| Carbon | 2,532 | 44.77% | 2,725 | 48.18% | 399 | 7.05% | -193 | -3.41% | 5,656 |
| Converse | 1,658 | 69.61% | 492 | 20.65% | 232 | 9.74% | 1,166 | 48.96% | 2,382 |
| Crook | 1,240 | 71.55% | 318 | 18.35% | 175 | 10.10% | 922 | 53.20% | 1,733 |
| Fremont | 5,417 | 57.64% | 3,093 | 32.91% | 888 | 9.45% | 2,324 | 24.73% | 9,398 |
| Goshen | 2,719 | 57.65% | 1,529 | 32.42% | 468 | 9.92% | 1,190 | 25.23% | 4,716 |
| Hot Springs | 1,273 | 59.38% | 705 | 32.88% | 166 | 7.74% | 568 | 26.50% | 2,144 |
| Johnson | 1,737 | 73.85% | 398 | 16.92% | 217 | 9.23% | 1,339 | 56.93% | 2,352 |
| Laramie | 9,824 | 46.80% | 9,519 | 45.35% | 1,649 | 7.86% | 305 | 1.45% | 20,992 |
| Lincoln | 2,030 | 57.01% | 1,246 | 34.99% | 285 | 8.00% | 784 | 22.02% | 3,561 |
| Natrona | 10,679 | 57.19% | 5,900 | 31.59% | 2,095 | 11.22% | 4,779 | 25.60% | 18,674 |
| Niobrara | 1,136 | 76.24% | 250 | 16.78% | 104 | 6.98% | 886 | 59.46% | 1,490 |
| Park | 4,677 | 65.56% | 1,852 | 25.96% | 605 | 8.48% | 2,825 | 39.60% | 7,134 |
| Platte | 1,613 | 54.36% | 1,035 | 34.88% | 319 | 10.75% | 578 | 19.48% | 2,967 |
| Sheridan | 5,163 | 61.22% | 2,659 | 31.53% | 612 | 7.26% | 2,504 | 29.69% | 8,434 |
| Sublette | 1,152 | 68.25% | 310 | 18.36% | 226 | 13.39% | 842 | 49.89% | 1,688 |
| Sweetwater | 2,726 | 36.60% | 4,086 | 54.85% | 637 | 8.55% | -1,360 | -18.25% | 7,449 |
| Teton | 1,419 | 69.25% | 461 | 22.50% | 169 | 8.25% | 958 | 46.75% | 2,049 |
| Uinta | 1,510 | 52.36% | 1,199 | 41.57% | 175 | 6.07% | 311 | 10.79% | 2,884 |
| Washakie | 2,038 | 64.01% | 948 | 29.77% | 198 | 6.22% | 1,090 | 34.24% | 3,184 |
| Weston | 1,497 | 63.08% | 610 | 25.71% | 266 | 11.21% | 887 | 37.37% | 2,373 |
| Totals | 70,927 | 55.76% | 45,173 | 35.51% | 11,105 | 8.73% | 25,754 | 20.25% | 127,205 |

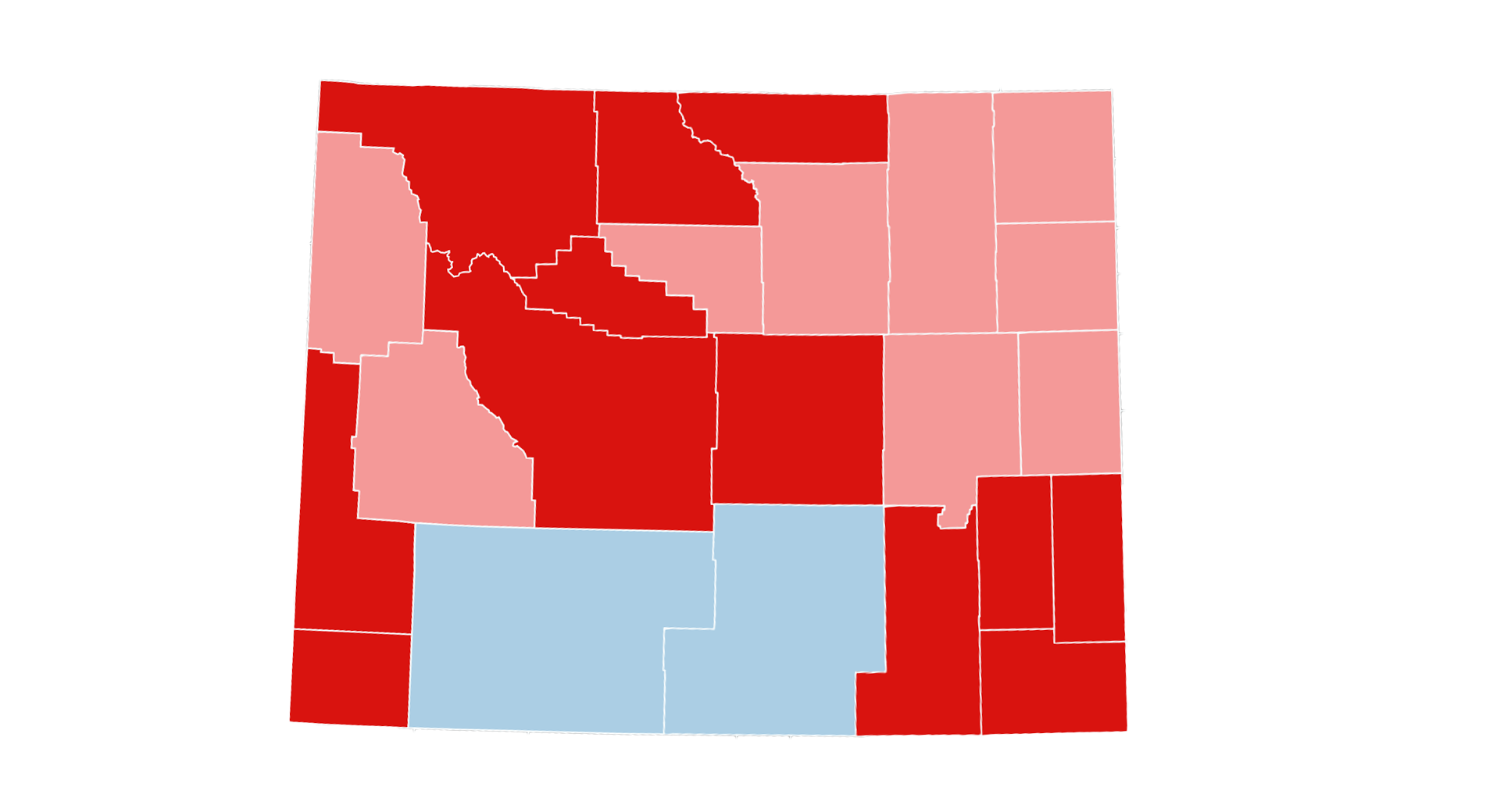
County flips from 1964: Democratic Hold Republican Hold Gain from Democratic

==== Counties that flipped from Democratic to Republican ====
- Albany
- Big Horn
- Fremont
- Goshen
- Hot Springs
- Laramie
- Lincoln
- Natrona
- Park
- Platte
- Sheridan
- Uinta

== See also ==
- United States presidential elections in Wyoming
