= 1940 United States presidential election in Wyoming =

- November 5, 1940

Nominee	Franklin D. Roosevelt	Wendell Willkie
Party	Democratic	Republican
Home state	New York	New York
Running mate	Henry A. Wallace	Charles McNary
Electoral vote	3	0
Popular vote	59,287	52,633
Percentage	52.82%	46.89%
County results
Roosevelt
50–60%
60–70%
70–80%
Willkie
50–60%
60–70%
President before election
Franklin D. Roosevelt
Democratic
Elected President
Franklin D. Roosevelt
Democratic

The 1940 United States presidential election in Wyoming took place on November 5, 1940, as part of the 1940 United States presidential election. State voters chose three representatives, or electors, to the Electoral College, who voted for president and vice president.

Wyoming was won by incumbent Democratic President Franklin D. Roosevelt, running with the 11th Secretary of Agriculture, Henry A. Wallace, as his vice president, with 52.82 percent of the popular vote, against the Republican candidate, American lawyer and corporate executive Wendell Willkie, running with Oregon senator Charles L. McNary, with 46.89 percent of the popular vote. Willkie outperformed Alf Landon's 1936 result by 17 points, and flipped 9 counties that Landon lost: Big Horn, Campell, Converse, Fremont, Goshen, Niobrara, Sublette, Washakie, and Weston.

Though originally against running for an unprecedented third term, Roosevelt was driven to do so after the outbreak of World War II in Europe when Germany invaded Poland in September 1939. With the American public strongly against intervention in Europe, Roosevelt and Willkie both promised not to get America involved in any foreign wars, however Willkie accused Roosevelt of not doing enough to prepare for the possibility of war, which the incumbent rebutted when he built up America's military and transformed it into "The Arsenal of Democracy". The Republicans then changed tactics and used this to accuse Roosevelt of secretly attempting to bring America into WW2, which Roosevelt had difficulty responding to and was more damaged by. Though the previous two elections had been largely contested over The Great Depression, by 1939 the United States had begun emerging from the Depression, however it would still be an important issue in the campaign as Roosevelt's "New Deal" programs were widely popular among voters and seen as ending the Depression, while Willkie, a wealthy corporate executive, was damaged by his ties to Big Business, which working class voters still blamed for the Depression. Willkie also warned about the dangers of breaking the two-term tradition, which was first begun by George Washington in 1789, and attacked Roosevelt for perceived incompetence and waste in his New Deal welfare programs. Despite his criticisms, Willkie said that he would keep most of the New Deal programs, and would make them more efficient.

Because the country was locked in conflict with Nazi Germany, the United Kingdom actively interfered in the election, attempting to persuade Americans to abandon their isolationist positions and join the fight. The U.K. strongly backed Roosevelt, but attempted to interfere in the Republican primaries to push a more hawkish candidate. America ultimately wouldn't enter the war against Germany until December 10th, 1941, a few days after the Japanese attack on Pearl Harbor.

With many voters wary of breaking the two-term tradition, Willkie vastly outperformed Alf Landon's 1936 results not only in Wyoming, but the entire nation, winning 10 states compared to Landon's 2. However, Roosevelt's popularity would prove too difficult to overcome, and he would successfully win an unprecedented third term. This would be the last occasion Teton County would vote for a Democratic presidential candidate until Bill Clinton carried the county in 1992 – since then it has become a Democratic island in the nation's "reddest" state. This would also be the third to last time that Wyoming would back the Democratic candidate in a presidential election and the last until 1948, as Republican Thomas Dewey would carry the state in 1944 by a narrow margin.

== Results ==
1940 United States presidential election in Wyoming
Party	Candidate	Votes	%
Democratic	Franklin D. Roosevelt (incumbent)	59,287	52.82%
Republican	Wendell Willkie	52,633	46.89%
Prohibition	Roger W. Babson	172	0.15%
Socialist	Norman Thomas	148	0.13%
Total votes		112,240	100.00%

=== Results by county ===
County	Franklin D. Roosevelt Democratic		Wendell Willkie Republican		Roger W. Babson Prohibition		Norman Thomas Socialist		Margin		Total votes cast
County	#	%	#	%	#	%	#	%	#	%	Total votes cast
Albany	4,018	59.05%	2,756	40.51%	16	0.24%	14	0.21%	1,262	18.55%	6,804
Big Horn	2,594	47.38%	2,859	52.22%	13	0.24%	9	0.16%	-265	-4.84%	5,475
Campbell	1,128	42.17%	1,540	57.57%	3	0.11%	4	0.15%	-412	-15.40%	2,675
Carbon	3,429	54.26%	2,882	45.60%	6	0.09%	3	0.05%	547	8.66%	6,320
Converse	1,395	42.45%	1,889	57.49%	2	0.06%	0	0.00%	-494	-15.03%	3,286
Crook	869	38.92%	1,359	60.86%	3	0.13%	2	0.09%	-490	-21.94%	2,233
Fremont	2,644	40.97%	3,788	58.70%	9	0.14%	12	0.19%	-1,144	-17.73%	6,453
Goshen	1,982	40.80%	2,861	58.89%	10	0.21%	5	0.10%	-879	-18.09%	4,858
Hot Springs	1,266	57.70%	913	41.61%	8	0.36%	7	0.32%	353	16.09%	2,194
Johnson	781	34.76%	1,460	64.98%	3	0.13%	3	0.13%	-679	-30.22%	2,247
Laramie	7,808	56.50%	5,955	43.09%	26	0.19%	31	0.22%	1,853	13.41%	13,820
Lincoln	2,839	61.65%	1,765	38.33%	1	0.02%	0	0.00%	1,074	23.32%	4,605
Natrona	6,373	53.34%	5,555	46.49%	10	0.08%	11	0.09%	818	6.85%	11,949
Niobrara	1,200	45.59%	1,427	54.22%	3	0.11%	2	0.08%	-227	-8.62%	2,632
Park	2,747	52.01%	2,512	47.56%	19	0.36%	4	0.08%	235	4.45%	5,282
Platte	1,849	51.05%	1,758	48.54%	4	0.11%	11	0.30%	91	2.51%	3,622
Sheridan	4,439	53.69%	3,814	46.13%	12	0.15%	3	0.04%	625	7.56%	8,268
Sublette	627	44.72%	771	54.99%	1	0.07%	3	0.21%	-144	-10.27%	1,402
Sweetwater	6,637	72.98%	2,439	26.82%	10	0.11%	8	0.09%	4,198	46.16%	9,094
Teton	728	53.81%	623	46.05%	1	0.07%	1	0.07%	105	7.76%	1,353
Uinta	2,007	59.89%	1,335	39.84%	6	0.18%	3	0.09%	672	20.05%	3,351
Washakie	942	46.34%	1,080	53.12%	5	0.25%	6	0.30%	-138	-6.79%	2,033
Weston	985	43.13%	1,292	56.57%	1	0.04%	6	0.26%	-307	-13.44%	2,284
Totals	59,287	52.82%	52,633	46.89%	172	0.15%	148	0.13%	6,654	5.93%	112,240

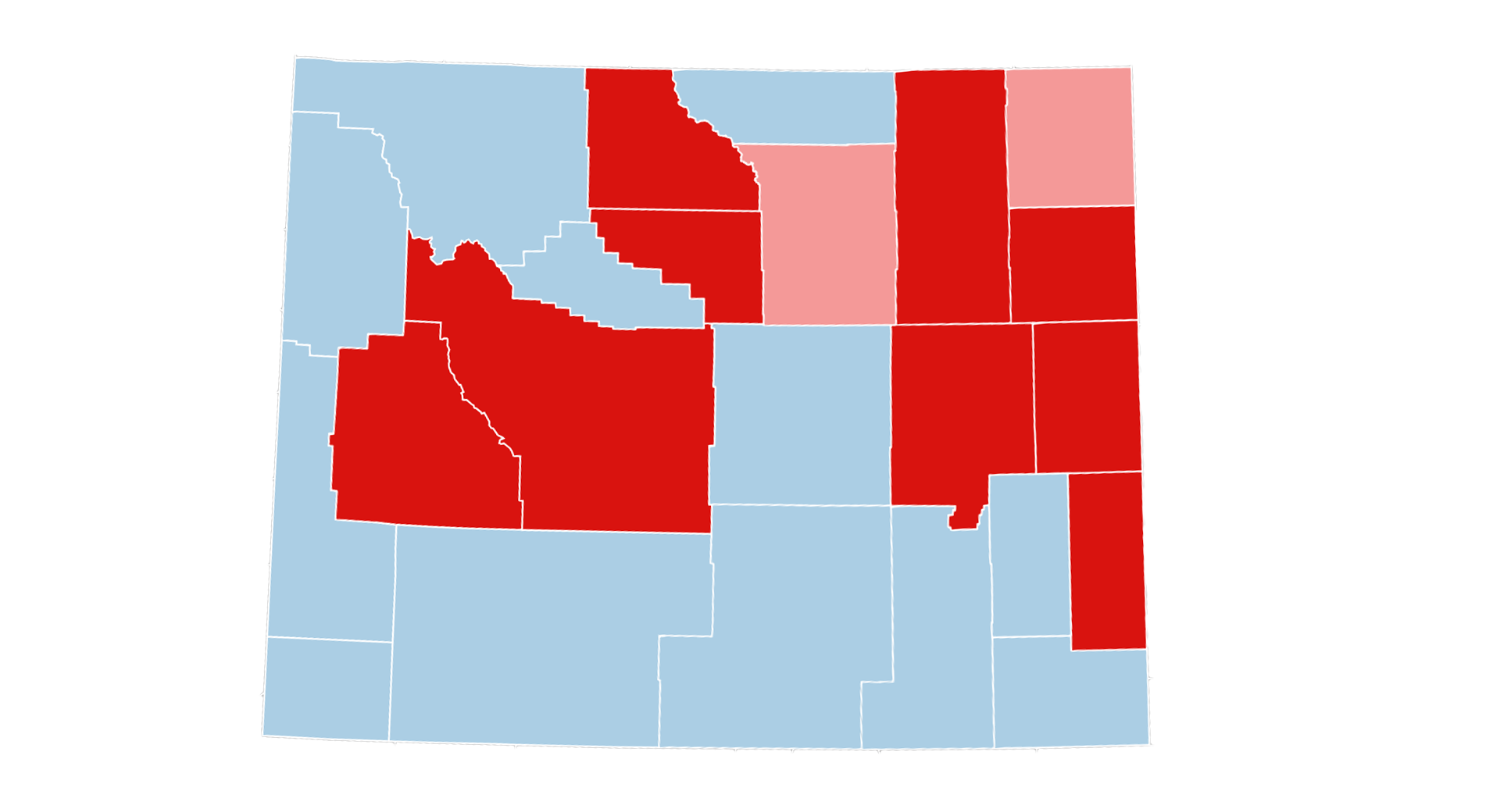
County flips from 1936: Democratic Hold Republican Hold Gain from Democratic

==== Counties that flipped from Democratic to Republican ====
- Big Horn
- Campbell
- Converse
- Fremont
- Goshen
- Niobrara
- Sublette
- Washakie
- Weston

== See also ==
- United States presidential elections in Wyoming
