= Little America, Wyoming =

- Census-designated place
- Billboard near Little America, Wyoming, 2002

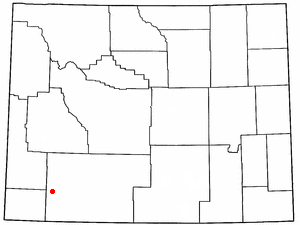
- Location of Little America, Wyoming
- Coordinates: 41°32′50″N 109°52′35″W
- Country: United States
- State: Wyoming
- County: Sweetwater

Area
  - Total: 7.8 sq mi (20.1 km^{2})
  - Land: 7.8 sq mi (20.1 km^{2})
  - Water: 0 sq mi (0.0 km^{2})
- Elevation: 6,424 ft (1,958 m)

Population (2010)
  - Total: 68
  - Density: 8.8/sq mi (3.4/km^{2})
- Time zone: UTC-7 (Mountain (MST))
  - Summer (DST): UTC-6 (MDT)
- ZIP code: 82929
- Area code: 307
- FIPS code: 56-46935
- GNIS feature ID: 2408617

Little America is a census-designated place (CDP) in western Sweetwater County, Wyoming, United States. The population was 68 at the 2010 census. The community got its name from the Little America motel, which was purposefully located in a remote location as a haven, not unlike the Little America base camp the polar explorer Richard E. Byrd set up in the Antarctic in 1928. Being situated on a coast-to-coast highway and offering travel services, it thrived, launching a chain of travel facilities by the same name. Its developer, Robert Earl Holding, died on April 19, 2013, with a personal net worth of over $3 billion.

== Geography ==
Little America is located on U.S. Route 30.

According to the United States Census Bureau, the CDP has a total area of 7.8 square miles (20 km^{2}), of which 7.8 square miles (20 km^{2}) is land and 0.13% is water.

== Demographics ==
As of the census of 2000, there were 56 people, 24 households, and 13 families residing in the CDP. The population density was 7.2 people per square mile (2.8 people/km^{2}). There were 48 housing units at an average density of 6.2 per square mile (2.4/km^{2}). The racial makeup of the CDP was 71.43% White, 28.57% from other races. Hispanic or Latino of any race were 44.64% of the population.

There were 24 households, out of which 45.8% had children under the age of 18 living with them, 33.3% were married couples living together, 20.8% had a female householder with no husband present, and 45.8% were non-families. 41.7% of all households were made up of individuals, and none had someone living alone who was 65 years of age or older. The average household size was 2.33 and the average family size was 3.23.

In the CDP, the population was spread out, with 32.1% under the age of 18, 28.6% from 18 to 24, 28.6% from 25 to 44, 10.7% from 45 to 64, . The median age was 21 years. For every 100 females, there were 100.0 males. For every 100 females age 18 and over, there were 123.5 males.

The median income for a household in the CDP was $18,125, and the median income for a family was $18,750. Males had a median income of $12,250 versus $8,750 for females. The per capita income for the CDP was $7,408. In spite of Little America's 100% employment rate, 29.7% of the population is below the poverty line, and 100% of the households responding to the census were tenants of absentee landlords.

== Education ==
Public education in the community of Little America is provided by Sweetwater County School District #2.
