= 1892 United States presidential election in Wyoming =

- November 8, 1892
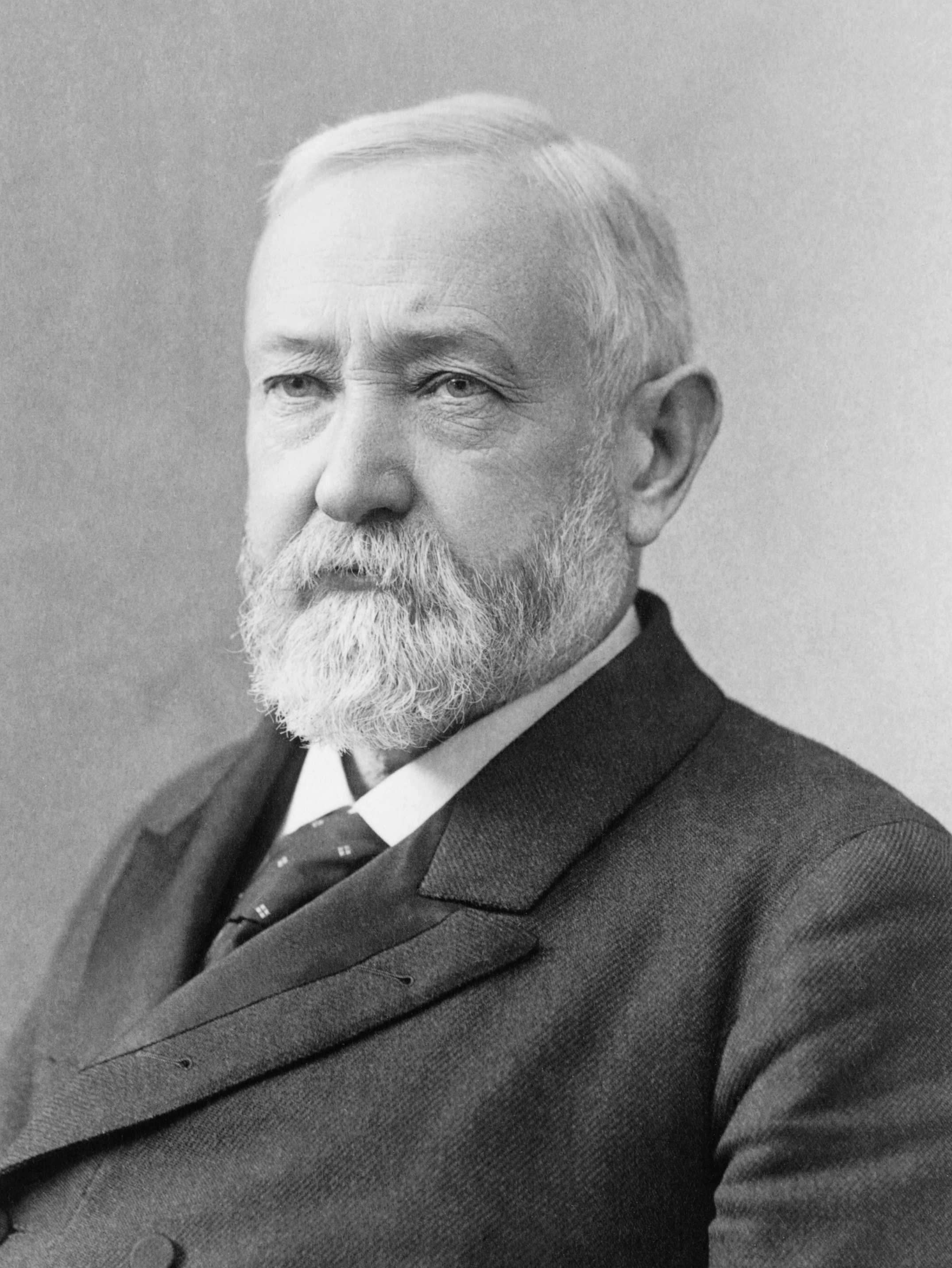

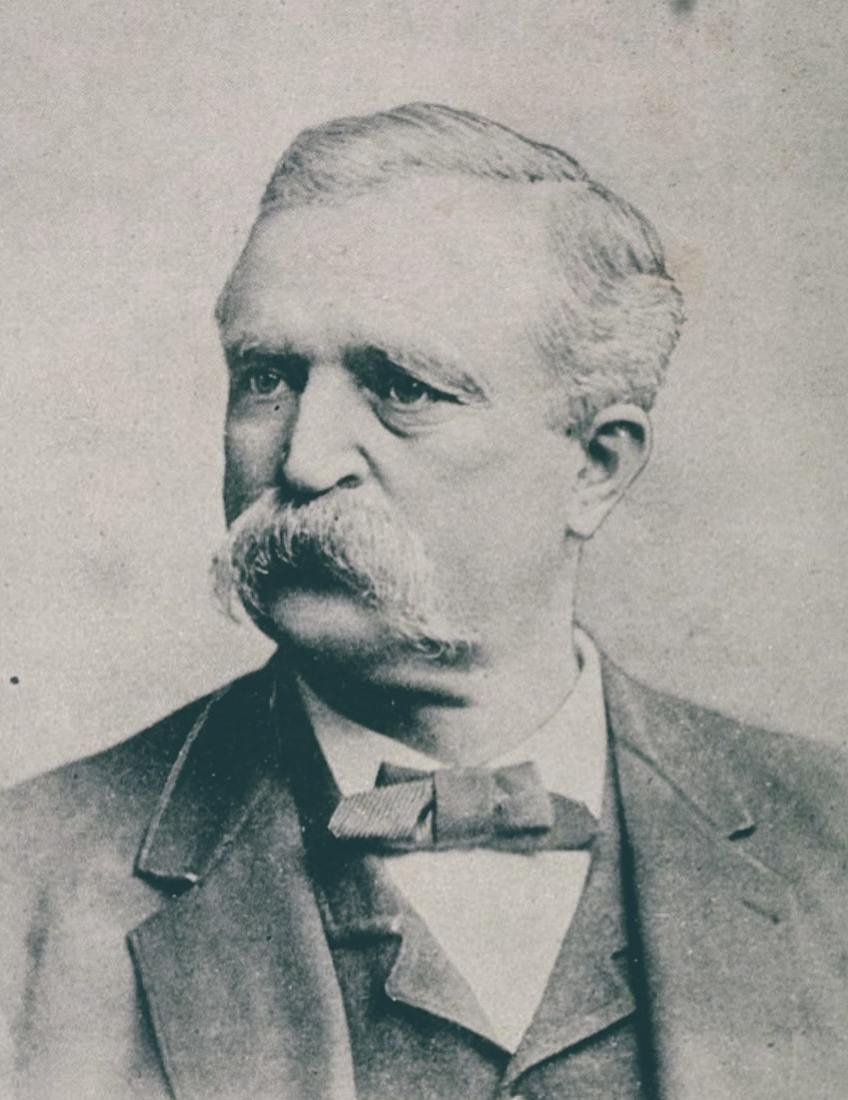
Nominee	Benjamin Harrison	James B. Weaver
Party	Republican	Populist
Alliance		Democratic (Note: Weaver took over the “Democratic” line in Wyoming, although nationally he ran as the nominee of the Populist Party.)
Home state	Indiana	Iowa
Running mate	Whitelaw Reid	James G. Field
Electoral vote	3	0
Popular vote	8,454	7,722
Percentage	50.52%	46.14%
County results
Harrison
40–50%
50–60%
Weaver
40–50%
50–60%
60–70%
President before election
Benjamin Harrison
Republican
Elected President
Grover Cleveland
Democratic

The 1892 United States presidential election in Wyoming took place on November 8, 1892, as part of the 1892 United States presidential election. State voters chose three representatives, or electors, to the Electoral College, who voted for president and vice president.

Wyoming participated in its first ever presidential election, having become the 44th state on July 10, 1890. The state was won by President Benjamin Harrison (R–Indiana), the 28th United States Ambassador to France Whitelaw Reid, with 50.52 percent of the popular vote, against representative James B. Weaver (P–Iowa), running with the Attorney General of Virginia, James G. Field, with 46.14 percent of the popular vote. Harrison won the state by a narrow margin of 4.38%.

== Campaign ==
The Wyoming Democratic Party endorsed the Populist electors in exchange for the Populists supporting the Democratic state candidates.

== Results ==
General Election Results
Party	Pledged to	Elector	Votes
Republican Party	Benjamin Harrison	John H. Barron	8,454
Republican Party	Benjamin Harrison	John C. Dyer	8,339
Republican Party	Benjamin Harrison	William Kilpatrick	8,300
People's Party	James B. Weaver	William Hinton	7,722
People's Party	James B. Weaver	William R. Richardson	7,600
People's Party	James B. Weaver	Shakespeare F. Sealey	7,512
Prohibition Party	John Bidwell	Oscar S. Jackson	530
Prohibition Party	John Bidwell	Ella G. Becker	498
Prohibition Party	John Bidwell	A. N. Page	456
Write-in		Scattering	29
Votes cast (Note: Based on totals for highest elector on each ticket)			16,735

=== Results by county ===
County	Benjamin Harrison Republican		James B. Weaver Populist		John Bidwell Prohibition		Scattering Write-in		Margin		Total votes cast (Note: Based on highest elector on each ticket)
County	#	%	#	%	#	%	#	%	#	%	Total votes cast
Albany	1,100	49.48%	1,041	46.83%	82	3.69%	0	0.00%	59	2.65%	2,223
Carbon	978	52.27%	853	45.59%	40	2.14%	0	0.00%	125	6.68%	1,871
Converse	494	54.23%	360	39.52%	57	6.26%	0	0.00%	134	14.71%	911
Crook	399	42.72%	516	55.25%	19	2.03%	0	0.00%	-117	-12.53%	934
Fremont	648	54.45%	495	41.60%	24	2.02%	23	1.93%	153	12.86%	1,190
Johnson	309	34.30%	561	62.26%	31	3.44%	0	0.00%	-252	-27.96%	901
Laramie	1,890	57.48%	1,329	40.42%	63	1.92%	6	0.18%	561	17.06%	3,288
Natrona	194	55.91%	148	42.65%	5	1.44%	0	0.00%	46	13.26%	347
Sheridan	509	46.36%	517	47.09%	72	6.56%	0	0.00%	-8	-0.73%	1,098
Sweetwater	674	47.03%	702	48.99%	57	3.98%	0	0.00%	-28	-1.96%	1,433
Uinta	965	47.65%	993	49.04%	67	3.31%	0	0.00%	-28	-1.39%	2,025
Weston	294	57.20%	207	40.27%	13	2.53%	0	0.00%	87	16.93%	514
Totals	8,454	50.52%	7,722	46.14%	530	3.17%	29	0.17%	732	4.37%	16,735

== See also ==
- United States presidential elections in Wyoming

== Works cited ==
- Knoles, George (1971). The Presidential Campaign and Election of 1892. Stanford University Press. ISBN 040450969X.
