= Granger, Wyoming =

Town in Sweetwater County, Wyoming, United States

- Town
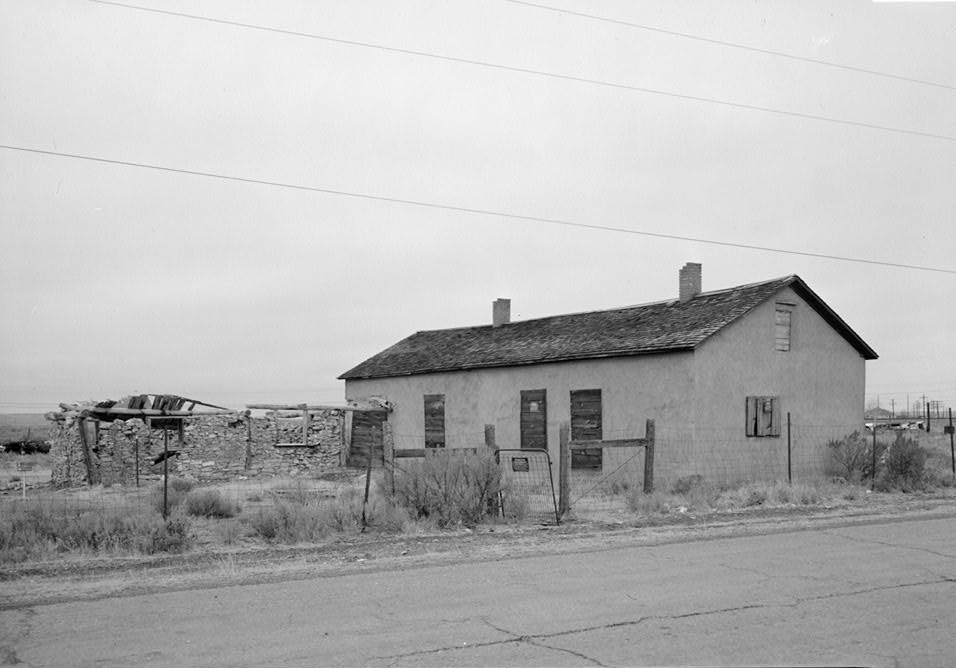
- Granger stage station, built in 1856, on Old U.S. Route 30

- Location of Granger in Sweetwater County, Wyoming
- Coordinates: 41°36′02″N 109°59′02″W
- Country: United States
- State: Wyoming
- County: Sweetwater

Area
  - Total: 2.59 sq mi (6.70 km^{2})
  - Land: 2.59 sq mi (6.70 km^{2})
  - Water: 0 sq mi (0.00 km^{2})
- Elevation: 6,273 ft (1,912 m)

Population (2020)
  - Total: 98
  - Density: 49/sq mi (19.1/km^{2})
- Time zone: UTC-7 (Mountain (MST))
  - Summer (DST): UTC-6 (MDT)
- ZIP code: 82934
- Area code: 307
- FIPS code: 56-32870
- GNIS feature ID: 2412704
- Website: grangerwyoming.com

Granger is a town along Blacks Fork near the western edge of Sweetwater County, Wyoming, United States. As of the 2020 census, Granger had a population of 98. Granger is located near the confluence of the Blacks Fork and the Hams Fork rivers. The geography of the area is flat with semi-arid scrub.

== Early history: 1834–1868 ==
Although the population has always been small, the site is located at the intersection of the Oregon Trail and the Overland Stage Trail and it was chosen for a stage coach station. The station, which was built of stone and adobe in 1856, was in operation when Mark Twain passed through, and still stands today. The Pony Express used this station as a stopover in 1861-62. Later, in 1868, it became a stop on the Union Pacific Railroad first transcontinental railroad, which was when it started to be called Granger.

The area of what is present-day Granger had significance to the mountain men who trapped in the early years of the American West. It was chosen as the site of their annual rendezvous in 1834 (the rendezvous was still somewhat spread out, as each supplier set up camp at different location along the river). The American Fur Company, among other suppliers, were present, and American Indians and trappers traded furs for goods. Several weeks were spent recounting events from the previous year and reveling in assorted amusements, while lubricated with liquor. The records show that the event occurred at the junction of the Hams Fork and Blacks Fork rivers.

== Geography ==
According to the United States Census Bureau, the town has a total area of 2.53 square miles (6.55 km^{2}), all land.

== Demographics ==
Historical population
Census	Pop.	Note	%±
1920	136		—
1930	135		−0.7%
1940	163		20.7%
1950	122		−25.2%
1960	159		30.3%
1970	137		−13.8%
1980	177		29.2%
1990	126		−28.8%
2000	146		15.9%
2010	139		−4.8%
2020	98		−29.5%
U.S. Decennial Census

=== 2010 census ===
As of the census of 2010, there were 139 people, 57 households, and 38 families living in the town. The population density was 54.9 inhabitants per square mile (21.2/km^{2}). There were 72 housing units at an average density of 28.5 per square mile (11.0/km^{2}). The racial makeup of the town was 88.5% White, 0.7% African American, 9.4% from other races, and 1.4% from two or more races. Hispanic or Latino of any race were 15.1% of the population.

There were 57 households, of which 24.6% had children under the age of 18 living with them, 54.4% were married couples living together, 3.5% had a female householder with no husband present, 8.8% had a male householder with no wife present, and 33.3% were non-families. 21.1% of all households were made up of individuals, and 5.3% had someone living alone who was 65 years of age or older. The average household size was 2.44 and the average family size was 2.82.

The median age in the town was 39.5 years. 25.2% of residents were under the age of 18; 5.7% were between the ages of 18 and 24; 23.8% were from 25 to 44; 38.1% were from 45 to 64; and 7.2% were 65 years of age or older. The gender makeup of the town was 54.7% male and 45.3% female.

=== 2000 census ===
As of the census of 2000, there were 146 people, 54 households, and 40 families living in the town. The population density was 59.0 people per square mile (22.8/km^{2}). There were 76 housing units at an average density of 30.7 per square mile (11.9/km^{2}). The racial makeup of the town was 82.19% White, 8.22% from other races, and 9.59% from two or more races. Hispanic or Latino of any race were 22.60% of the population.

There were 54 households, out of which 35.2% had children under the age of 18 living with them, 68.5% were married couples living together, 5.6% had a female householder with no husband present, and 25.9% were non-families. 24.1% of all households were made up of individuals, and 5.6% had someone living alone who was 65 years of age or older. The average household size was 2.70 and the average family size was 3.18.

In the town, the population was spread out, with 28.8% under the age of 18, 10.3% from 18 to 24, 18.5% from 25 to 44, 33.6% from 45 to 64, and 8.9% who were 65 years of age or older. The median age was 38 years. For every 100 females, there were 100.0 males. For every 100 females age 18 and over, there were 116.7 males.

The median income for a household in the town was $46,563, and the median income for a family was $52,083. Males had a median income of $45,750 versus $19,375 for females. The per capita income for the town was $17,764. There were 10.5% of families and 12.3% of the population living below the poverty line, including 5.7% of under eighteens and 21.1% of those over 64.

== Education ==
Public education in the town of Granger is provided by Sweetwater County School District #2.

Granger has a public library, a branch of the Sweetwater County Library System.

== See also ==
- List of municipalities in Wyoming
