= 1904 United States presidential election in Wyoming =

- November 8, 1904
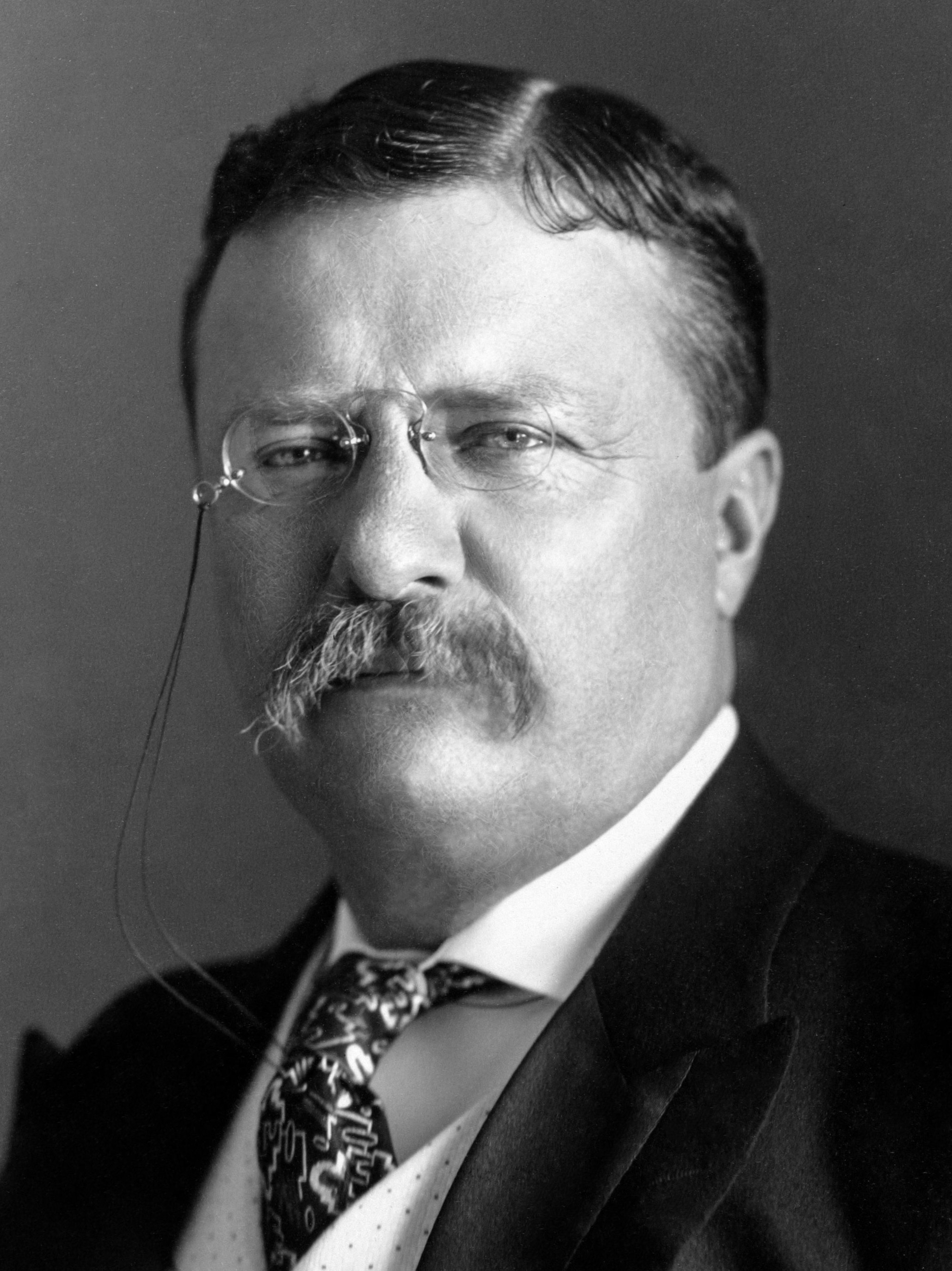

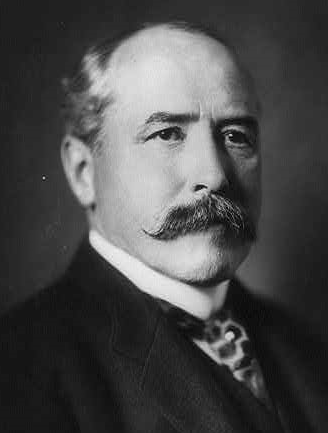
Nominee	Theodore Roosevelt	Alton Parker
Party	Republican	Democratic
Home state	New York	New York
Running mate	Charles W. Fairbanks	Henry G. Davis
Electoral vote	3	0
Popular vote	20,846	8,930
Percentage	66.72%	29.08%
County results
Roosevelt
50–60%
60–70%
70–80%
President before election
Theodore Roosevelt
Republican
Elected President
Theodore Roosevelt
Republican

The 1904 United States presidential election in Wyoming took place on November 8, 1904, as part of the 1904 United States presidential election. State voters chose three representatives, or electors, to the Electoral College, who voted for president and vice president.

Wyoming was won by the 26th and sitting President of the United States Theodore Roosevelt (R–New York), who assumed office after the Assassination of William McKinley, running with the 26th Vice President of the United States Charles W. Fairbanks. Roosevelt and Fairbanks won with 66.72 percent of the popular vote against Chief Judge of the New York Court of Appeals Alton B. Parker (D–New York), running with Senator Henry G. Davis, with 29.08 percent of the popular vote. Roosevelt won the state by a margin of 37.64%.

== Results ==
General Election Results
Party	Pledged to	Elector	Votes
Republican Party	Theodore Roosevelt	Ora Haley	20,489
Republican Party	Theodore Roosevelt	James M. Wilson	20,487
Republican Party	Theodore Roosevelt	Atwood C. Thomas	20,468
Democratic Party	Alton B. Parker	George T. Beck	8,930
Democratic Party	Alton B. Parker	J. L. Murray	8,881
Democratic Party	Alton B. Parker	A. V. Quinn	8,872
Socialist Party	Eugene V. Debs	William W. Peterson	1,072
Socialist Party	Eugene V. Debs	John Gaiselman	1,065
Socialist Party	Eugene V. Debs	Peter Esperson	987
Prohibition Party	Silas C. Swallow	Anna B. Holliday	217
Prohibition Party	Silas C. Swallow	Ellen Lee Bristol	208
Prohibition Party	Silas C. Swallow	Isaac L. Oakes	195
Votes cast (Note: Based on totals for highest elector on each ticket)			30,708

=== Results by county ===
County	Theodore Roosevelt Republican		Alton B. Parker Democratic		Eugene V. Debs Socialist		Silas C. Swallow Prohibition		Margin		Total votes cast (Note: Based on highest elector on each ticket)
County	#	%	#	%	#	%	#	%	#	%	Total votes cast
Albany	1,674	63.41%	706	26.74%	201	7.61%	59	2.23%	968	36.67%	2,640
Big Horn	1,962	70.83%	751	27.11%	41	1.48%	16	0.58%	1,211	43.72%	2,770
Carbon	2,234	68.34%	956	29.24%	73	2.23%	6	0.18%	1,278	39.09%	3,269
Converse	1,098	72.33%	395	26.02%	9	0.59%	16	1.05%	703	46.31%	1,518
Crook	984	64.27%	475	31.03%	58	3.79%	14	0.91%	509	33.25%	1,531
Fremont	1,009	63.06%	563	35.19%	23	1.44%	5	0.31%	446	27.88%	1,600
Johnson	725	60.82%	459	38.51%	7	0.59%	1	0.08%	266	22.32%	1,192
Laramie	3,109	69.77%	1,167	26.19%	131	2.94%	49	1.10%	1,942	43.58%	4,456
Natrona	738	69.30%	320	30.05%	2	0.19%	5	0.47%	418	39.25%	1,065
Sheridan	1,905	59.49%	1,068	33.35%	212	6.62%	17	0.53%	837	26.14%	3,202
Sweetwater	1,473	71.37%	464	22.48%	115	5.57%	12	0.58%	1,009	48.89%	2,064
Uinta	2,768	63.52%	1,385	31.78%	189	4.34%	16	0.37%	1,383	31.73%	4,358
Weston	810	77.66%	221	21.19%	11	1.05%	1	0.10%	589	56.47%	1,043
Totals	20,489	66.72%	8,930	29.08%	1,072	3.49%	217	0.71%	11,559	37.64%	30,708

== See also ==
- United States presidential elections in Wyoming
