= McKinnon, Wyoming =

Census-designated place in Sweetwater County, Wyoming, United States

- Census-designated place
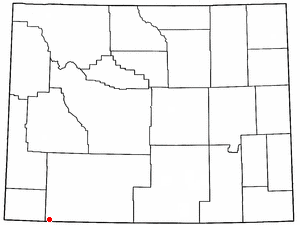
- Location of McKinnon, Wyoming
- Coordinates: 41°01′53″N 109°56′18″W
- Country: United States
- State: Wyoming
- County: Sweetwater

Area
  - Total: 5.85 sq mi (15.2 km^{2})
  - Land: 5.85 sq mi (15.2 km^{2})
  - Water: 0.0 sq mi (0 km^{2})
- Elevation: 7,057 ft (2,151 m)

Population (2010)
  - Total: 60
  - Density: 10/sq mi (4.0/km^{2})
- Time zone: UTC-7 (Mountain (MST))
  - Summer (DST): UTC-6 (MDT)
- ZIP code: 82938
- Area code: 307
- FIPS code: 56-49400
- GNIS feature ID: 2408202

McKinnon is a census-designated place (CDP) in Sweetwater County, Wyoming, United States. The population was 60 at the 2010 census.

The first rendezvous of white traders and trappers in the Rocky Mountains took place in July 1825, just north of McKinnon along the Henrys Fork river. They joined members of William Henry Ashley's expedition.

== Geography ==
According to the United States Census Bureau, the CDP has a total area of 5.85 square miles (15.2 km^{2}), all land.

== Demographics ==
As of the census of 2000, there were 49 people, 17 households, and 14 families residing in the CDP. The population density was 1.6 people per square mile (0.62 people/km^{2}). There were 28 housing units at an average density of 0.9 per square mile (0.35/km^{2}). The racial makeup of the CDP was 93.88% White, 6.12% from other races. Hispanic or Latino of any race were 6.12% of the population.

There were 17 households, out of which 35.3% had children under the age of 18 living with them, 82.4% were married couples living together, 5.9% had a female householder with no husband present, and 11.8% were non-families. 11.8% of all households were made up of individuals, and 5.9% had someone living alone who was 65 years of age or older. The average household size was 2.88 and the average family size was 3.13.

In the CDP, the population was spread out, with 26.5% under the age of 18, 8.2% from 18 to 24, 32.7% from 25 to 44, 22.4% from 45 to 64, and 10.2% who were 65 years of age or older. The median age was 38 years. For every 100 females, there were 113.0 males. For every 100 females age 18 and over, there were 140.0 males.

The median income for a household in the CDP was $80,216, and the median income for a family was $81,998. Males had a median income of $53,750 versus $25,417 for females. The per capita income for the CDP was $37,833. None of the population or the families were below the poverty line.

== Education ==
McKinnon is within Sweetwater County School District #2.

McKinnon students may choose to attend Daggett School District schools in Utah.

== See also ==
- List of census-designated places in Wyoming
