= 1952 United States presidential election in Wyoming =

- November 4, 1952

All 3 Wyoming votes to the Electoral College

Nominee	Dwight D. Eisenhower	Adlai Stevenson
Party	Republican	Democratic
Home state	New York	Illinois
Running mate	Richard Nixon	John Sparkman
Electoral vote	3	0
Popular vote	81,047	47,934
Percentage	62.71%	37.09%
County results
Eisenhower
50–60%
60–70%
70–80%
Stevenson
60–70%
President before election
Harry S. Truman
Democratic
Elected President
Dwight D. Eisenhower
Republican

The 1952 United States presidential election in Wyoming took place on November 4, 1952, as part of the 1952 United States presidential election. State voters chose three representatives, or electors, to the Electoral College, who voted for president and vice president.

Wyoming was won by the Republican candidate, Columbia University President Dwight D. Eisenhower from New York, running with California Senator Richard Nixon, with 62.71 percent of the popular vote, against the Democratic candidate, Adlai Stevenson from Illinois, running with Alabama Senator John Sparkman, with 38.93 percent of the popular vote, a margin of victory of 25.6%. Eisenhower was able to easily carry the state despite the fact that it had voted for Harry Truman 4 years earlier in 1948, with the state trending to the right by almost 30 points in this election. Wyoming weighed in as 14.7% more Republican than the rest of the nation.

Stevenson only won one county, with that being the heavily unionized Sweetwater, which no Republican had won since Warren Harding in 1920. With the Republican victory in this race and the next two consecutive elections, Wyoming would begin its transition into a Republican stronghold, only voting for the Democratic presidential nominee one more time, in 1964. In fact, since 1964, Democrats haven't even managed to crack 40% of the statewide vote in an election.

== Results ==
1952 United States presidential election in Wyoming
Party	Candidate	Votes	%
Republican	Dwight D. Eisenhower	81,047	62.71%
Democratic	Adlai Stevenson	47,934	37.09%
Prohibition	Stuart Hamblen	194	0.15%
Socialist	Darlington Hoopes	40	0.03%
Labor	Eric Hass	36	0.03%
Total votes		129,251	100.00%

=== Results by county ===
County	Dwight D. Eisenhower Republican		Adlai Stevenson Democratic		Stuart Hamblen Prohibition		Darlington Hoopes Socialist		Eric Hass Labor		Margin		Total votes cast
County	#	%	#	%	#	%	#	%	#	%	#	%	Total votes cast
Albany	4,560	59.59%	3,082	40.28%	6	0.08%	4	0.05%	0	0.00%	1,478	19.31%	7,652
Big Horn	3,859	68.67%	1,755	31.23%	5	0.09%	1	0.02%	0	0.00%	2,104	37.44%	5,620
Campbell	1,823	73.10%	666	26.70%	4	0.16%	1	0.04%	0	0.00%	1,157	46.40%	2,494
Carbon	3,403	51.09%	3,242	48.67%	5	0.08%	2	0.03%	9	0.14%	161	2.42%	6,661
Converse	2,056	70.51%	850	29.15%	10	0.34%	0	0.00%	0	0.00%	1,206	41.36%	2,916
Crook	1,734	79.80%	423	19.47%	10	0.46%	3	0.14%	3	0.14%	1,311	60.33%	2,173
Fremont	5,881	72.94%	2,161	26.80%	17	0.21%	3	0.04%	1	0.01%	3,720	46.14%	8,063
Goshen	3,396	67.14%	1,648	32.58%	9	0.18%	4	0.08%	1	0.02%	1,748	34.56%	5,058
Hot Springs	1,573	64.68%	856	35.20%	2	0.08%	1	0.04%	0	0.00%	717	29.48%	2,432
Johnson	1,980	78.45%	543	21.51%	1	0.04%	0	0.00%	0	0.00%	1,437	56.94%	2,524
Laramie	10,785	56.61%	8,187	42.97%	59	0.31%	12	0.06%	8	0.04%	2,598	13.64%	19,051
Lincoln	2,321	57.59%	1,709	42.41%	0	0.00%	0	0.00%	0	0.00%	612	15.18%	4,030
Natrona	10,663	63.87%	6,021	36.06%	10	0.06%	1	0.01%	0	0.00%	4,642	27.81%	16,695
Niobrara	1,652	73.13%	588	26.03%	18	0.80%	1	0.04%	0	0.00%	1,064	47.10%	2,259
Park	5,067	70.62%	2,084	29.05%	19	0.26%	3	0.04%	2	0.03%	2,983	41.57%	7,175
Platte	2,148	60.95%	1,364	38.71%	5	0.14%	5	0.14%	2	0.06%	784	22.24%	3,524
Sheridan	6,522	67.55%	3,124	32.36%	5	0.05%	4	0.04%	0	0.00%	3,398	35.19%	9,655
Sublette	1,013	74.54%	344	25.31%	1	0.07%	1	0.07%	0	0.00%	669	49.23%	1,359
Sweetwater	3,567	38.05%	5,807	61.95%	0	0.00%	0	0.00%	0	0.00%	-2,240	-23.90%	9,374
Teton	1,166	78.62%	317	21.38%	0	0.00%	0	0.00%	0	0.00%	849	57.24%	1,483
Uinta	1,801	55.45%	1,444	44.46%	1	0.03%	1	0.03%	1	0.03%	357	10.99%	3,248
Washakie	2,148	70.82%	880	29.01%	4	0.13%	1	0.03%	0	0.00%	1,268	41.81%	3,033
Weston	1,931	69.61%	839	30.25%	3	0.11%	1	0.04%	0	0.00%	1,092	39.36%	2,774
Totals	81,047 (Note: The county figures add up to 81,049)	62.71%	47,934	37.09%	194	0.15%	40	0.03%	36	0.03%	33,113	25.62%	129,251

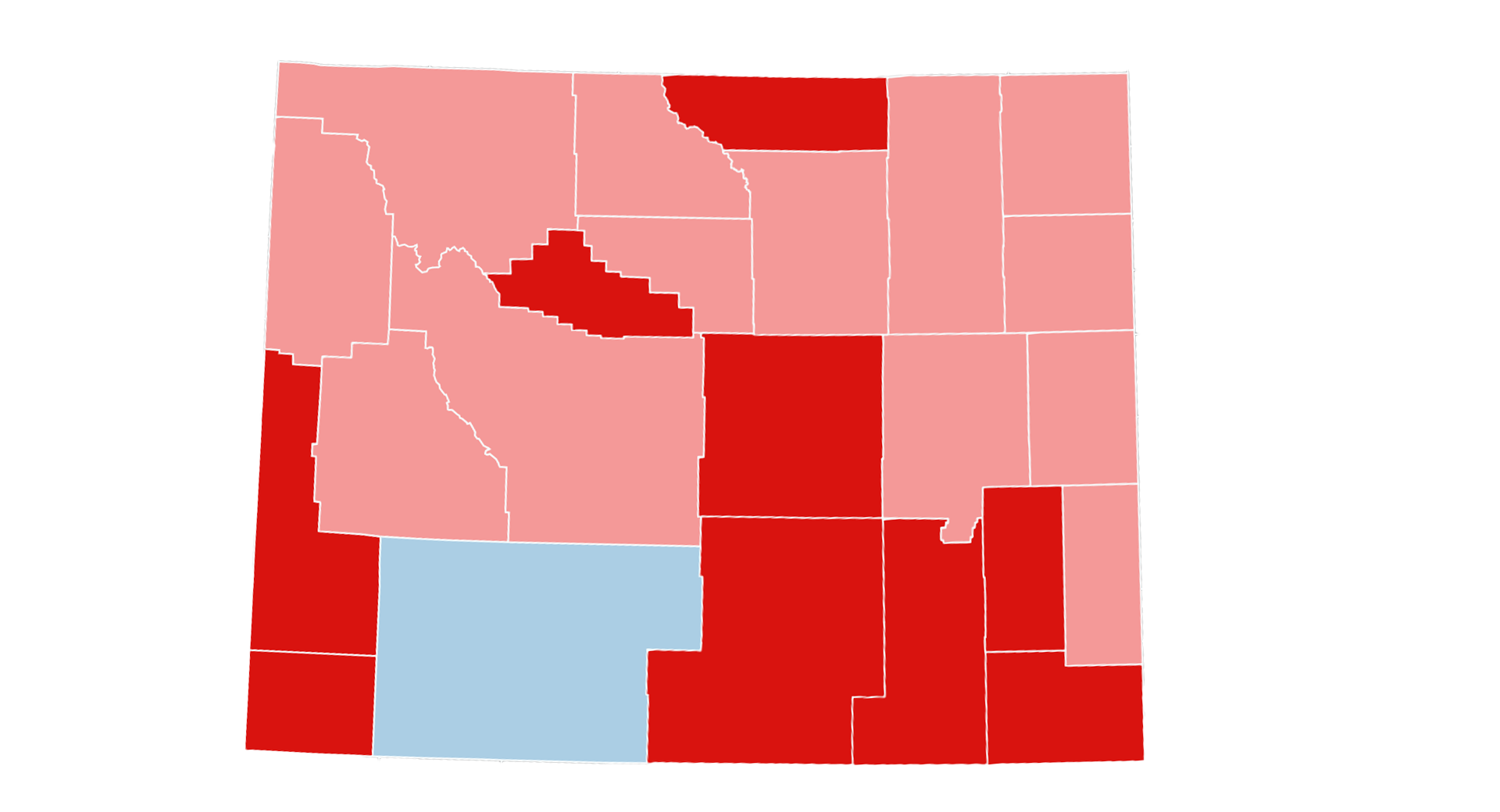
County flips from 1948: Democratic Hold Republican Hold Gain from Democratic

==== Counties that flipped from Democratic to Republican ====
- Albany
- Carbon
- Hot Springs
- Laramie
- Lincoln
- Natrona
- Platte
- Sheridan
- Uinta

== See also ==
- United States presidential elections in Wyoming
