= 1924 United States presidential election in Wyoming =

- November 4, 1924

Nominee	Calvin Coolidge	Robert M. La Follette	John W. Davis
Party	Republican	Independent	Democratic
Home state	New York	Wisconsin	West Virginia
Running mate	Charles G. Dawes	Burton K. Wheeler	Charles W. Bryan
Electoral vote	3	0	0
Popular vote	41,858	25,174	12,868
Percentage	52.39%	31.51%	16.11%
County results
Coolidge
40–50%
50–60%
60–70%
La Follette
40–50%
President before election
Calvin Coolidge
Republican
Elected President
Calvin Coolidge
Republican

The 1924 United States presidential election in Wyoming took place on November 4, 1924, as part of the 1924 United States presidential election. State voters chose three representatives, or electors, to the Electoral College, who voted for president and vice president.

Wyoming was won by the 30th president of the United States Calvin Coolidge (R–Massachusetts), running with Director of the Bureau of the Budget Charles G. Dawes, with 52.39 percent of the popular vote, against the 20th Governor of Wisconsin Robert M. La Follette (P–Wisconsin), running with Senator Burton K. Wheeler, with 31.51 percent of the popular vote and the 14th Solicitor General of the United States John W. Davis (D–West Virginia), running with the 20th and 23rd governor of Nebraska Charles W. Bryan, with 16.11 percent of the popular vote.

Wyoming was one of the eleven Western and Midwestern states where Robert M. La Follette Sr. placed second, with 31.51 percent of the vote, but the only state that he succeeded in winning was his home state of Wisconsin.

== Results ==
General Election Results (Note: The 1925 Official Directory does not list the full results for the La Follette electors. It does give the respective county figures for La Follette elector Bailey on each detail page, but not does not list the figures for the other two electors. The totals for Webb and Japcke are given in the 12/2/1924 Wyoming Star Tribune and Cheyenne State Leader.)
Party	Pledged to	Elector	Votes
Republican Party	Calvin Coolidge	James M. Graham	41,858
Republican Party	Calvin Coolidge	Henry Perrett	40,911
Republican Party	Calvin Coolidge	Lee Simonson	40,469
Independent	Robert M. La Follette	C. E. Bailey	25,174
Independent	Robert M. La Follette	A. V. Webb	24,386
Independent	Robert M. La Follette	Dora L. Japcke	24,360
Democratic Party	John W. Davis	Anna Haggard	12,868
Democratic Party	John W. Davis	Lee Moore	12,753
Democratic Party	John W. Davis	Harriette C. Hood	12,747
Votes cast (Note: Based on totals for highest elector on each ticket)			79,900

=== Results by county ===
County	Calvin Coolidge Republican		Robert M. La Follette Independent		John W. Davis Democratic		Margin		Total votes cast (Note: Based on highest elector on each ticket)
County	#	%	#	%	#	%	#	%	Total votes cast
Albany	2,164	47.72%	1,628	35.90%	743	16.38%	536	11.82%	4,535
Big Horn	2,023	54.45%	1,233	33.19%	459	12.36%	790	21.27%	3,715
Campbell	1,121	52.36%	443	20.69%	577	26.95%	544 (Note: In this county where Davis did finish ahead of La Follette, margin given is Coolidge vote minus Davis vote and percentage margin Coolidge percentage minus Davis percentage.)	25.41%	2,141
Carbon	2,398	54.56%	1,264	28.76%	733	16.68%	1,134	25.80%	4,395
Converse	1,758	58.46%	725	24.11%	524	17.43%	1,033	34.35%	3,007
Crook	978	54.48%	349	19.44%	468	26.07%	510	28.41%	1,795
Fremont	1,986	51.73%	1,292	33.65%	561	14.61%	694	18.08%	3,839
Goshen	1,603	56.15%	788	27.60%	464	16.25%	815	28.55%	2,855
Hot Springs	1,011	45.73%	969	43.83%	231	10.45%	42	1.90%	2,211
Johnson	1,097	58.01%	293	15.49%	501	26.49%	596	31.52%	1,891
Laramie	3,944	53.00%	2,378	31.95%	1,120	15.05%	1,566	21.04%	7,442
Lincoln	1,493	48.25%	1,025	33.13%	576	18.62%	468	15.13%	3,094
Natrona	8,267	60.10%	3,857	28.04%	1,631	11.86%	4,410	32.06%	13,755
Niobrara	820	48.43%	671	39.63%	202	11.93%	149	8.80%	1,693
Park	1,607	55.47%	760	26.23%	530	18.29%	847	29.24%	2,897
Platte	1,383	49.55%	972	34.83%	436	15.62%	411	14.73%	2,791
Sheridan	2,530	42.76%	2,272	38.40%	1,115	18.84%	258	4.36%	5,917
Sublette	570	67.38%	93	10.99%	183	21.63%	387	45.74%	846
Sweetwater	2,119	42.16%	2,219	44.15%	688	13.69%	-100	-1.99%	5,026
Teton	342	54.63%	111	17.73%	173	27.64%	169	27.00%	626
Uinta	1,126	45.51%	921	37.23%	427	17.26%	205	8.29%	2,474
Washakie	724	60.13%	271	22.51%	209	17.36%	453	37.62%	1,204
Weston	794	45.35%	640	36.55%	317	18.10%	154	8.79%	1,751
Totals	41,858	52.39%	25,174	31.51%	12,868	16.11%	16,684	20.88%	79,900

==== Counties that flipped from Republican to Independent ====
- Sweetwater

== See also ==
- United States presidential elections in Wyoming
