= Sweetwater County, Wyoming =

County in the United States

- County
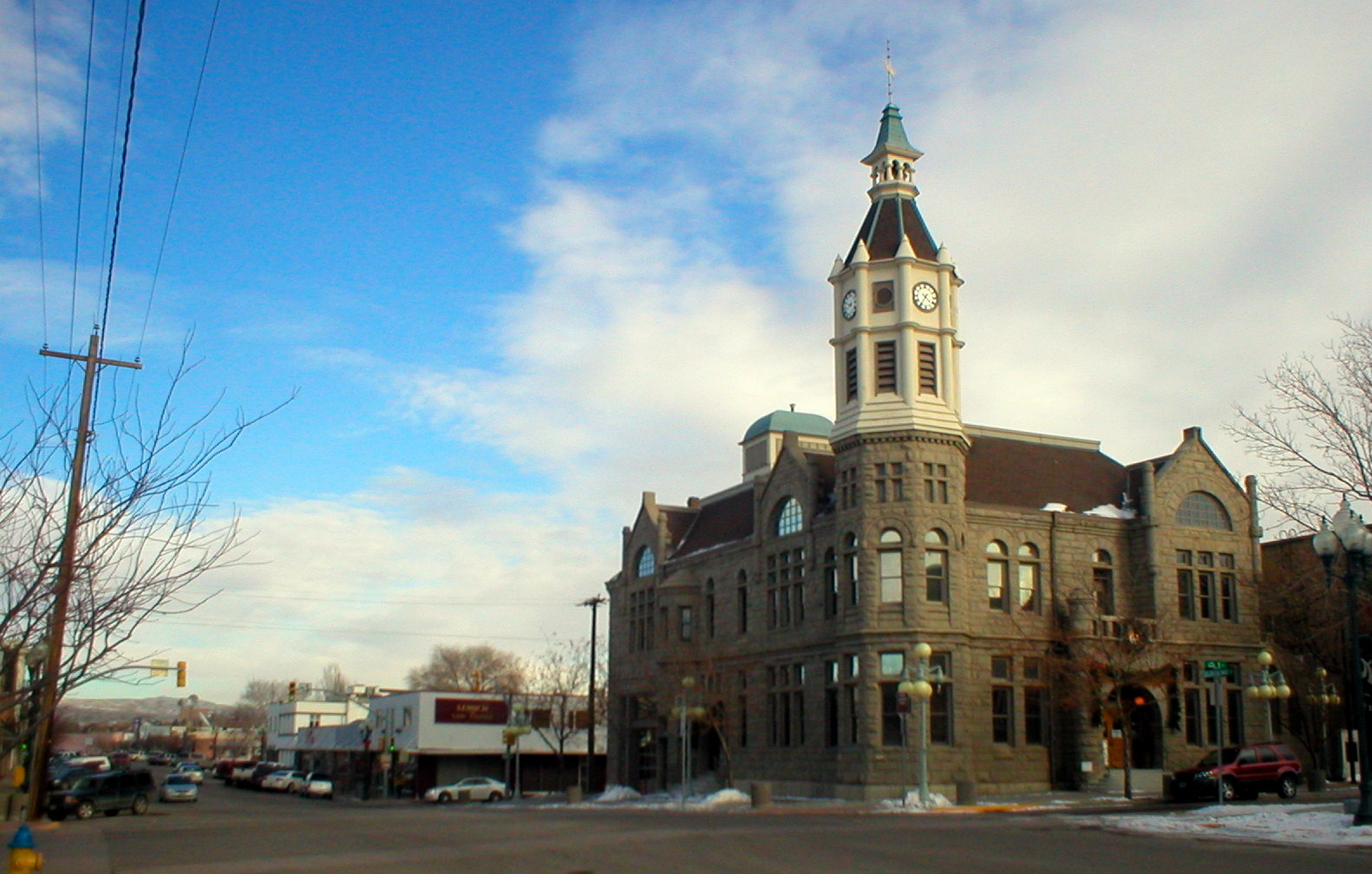
- Rock Springs City Hall, 2007

- Flag

- Location within the U.S. state of Wyoming
- Country: United States
- State: Wyoming
- Founded: December 17, 1867
- Named for: Sweetwater River
- Seat: Green River
- Largest city: Rock Springs

Area
  - Total: 10,491 sq mi (27,170 km^{2})
  - Land: 10,427 sq mi (27,010 km^{2})
  - Water: 64 sq mi (170 km^{2}) 0.6%

Population (2020)
  - Total: 42,272
  - Estimate (2025): 41,267 ▼
  - Density: 4.0541/sq mi (1.5653/km^{2})
- Time zone: UTC−7 (Mountain)
  - Summer (DST): UTC−6 (MDT)
- Area code: 307
- Congressional district: At-large
- Website: sweetwatercountywy.gov

Sweetwater County is a county in southwestern Wyoming, United States. As of the 2020 United States census, the population was 42,272, making it the fourth-most populous county in Wyoming. Its county seat is Green River. By area, it is the largest county in Wyoming. Its southern boundary line abuts the north lines of the states of Colorado and Utah. Sweetwater County comprises the Rock Springs, Green River, Wyoming Micropolitan Statistical Area.

== History ==
Sweetwater County was created on December 17, 1867, as a county within the Dakota Territory. The county was formed of territory partitioned from Laramie County. The county was originally named Carter County for Judge W.A. Carter of Fort Bridger. In 1869, the newly established legislature of the Wyoming Territory renamed the county for the Sweetwater River.

Also in 1869, Uinta County was organized with land ceded by Sweetwater County. Johnson County, originally named Pease County, was formed from parts of Sweetwater and Carbon counties in 1875. In 1884, Sweetwater County lost territory when Fremont County was created. Sweetwater County also lost territory when its boundary with Carbon County was adjusted in 1886. County boundaries were also adjusted in 1909, 1911, and 1951.

South Pass City was the county seat from 1867 until 1873, when the county seat was moved to Green River.

== Geography ==
According to the U.S. Census Bureau, the county has a total area of 10,491 square miles (27,170 km^{2}), of which 10,427 square miles (27,010 km^{2}) is land and 64 square miles (170 km^{2}) (0.6%) is water. The largest county in Wyoming, Sweetwater County is larger than six states and is the eighth-largest county in the United States (not including boroughs and census areas in Alaska). Most of the Great Divide Basin lies within the county, comprising the county's northeast quadrant. The Continental Divide runs through the county.

=== Adjacent counties ===
- Fremont County (north)
- Carbon County (east)
- Moffat County, Colorado (south)
- Daggett County, Utah (southwest)
- Summit County, Utah (west-southwest)
- Uinta County (southwest)
- Lincoln County (west)
- Sublette County (northwest)

=== Major highways ===
- Interstate 80
- I-80 BL
- I-80 BL
- U.S. Highway 30
- U.S. Highway 191
- Wyoming Highway 28
- Wyoming Highway 370
- Wyoming Highway 371
- Wyoming Highway 372
- Wyoming Highway 414
- Wyoming Highway 430
- Wyoming Highway 530
- Wyoming Highway 789

=== National protected areas ===
- Ashley National Forest (part)
- Flaming Gorge National Recreation Area (part)
- Seedskadee National Wildlife Refuge

== Demographics ==
Historical population
| Census | Pop. | Note | %± |
|---|---|---|---|
| 1870 | 1,916 | | — |
| 1880 | 2,561 | | 33.7% |
| 1890 | 4,941 | | 92.9% |
| 1900 | 8,455 | | 71.1% |
| 1910 | 11,575 | | 36.9% |
| 1920 | 13,640 | | 17.8% |
| 1930 | 18,165 | | 33.2% |
| 1940 | 19,407 | | 6.8% |
| 1950 | 22,017 | | 13.4% |
| 1960 | 17,920 | | −18.6% |
| 1970 | 18,391 | | 2.6% |
| 1980 | 41,723 | | 126.9% |
| 1990 | 38,823 | | −7.0% |
| 2000 | 37,613 | | −3.1% |
| 2010 | 43,806 | | 16.5% |
| 2020 | 42,272 | | −3.5% |
| 2025 (est.) | 41,267 | ▼ | −2.4% |
US Decennial Census; 1870–2000 2010–2020

=== 2020 census ===
As of the 2020 census, the county had a population of 42,272. Of the residents, 26.5% were under the age of 18 and 13.3% were 65 years of age or older; the median age was 36.4 years. For every 100 females there were 104.6 males, and for every 100 females age 18 and over there were 103.7 males.

Sweetwater County, Wyoming – Rracial and ethnic composition Note: the US Census treats Hispanic/Latino as an ethnic category. This table excludes Latinos from the racial categories and assigns them to a separate category. Hispanics/Latinos may be of any race.
| Race / ethnicity (NH = Non-Hispanic) | Pop 2000 | Pop 2010 | Pop 2020 | % 2000 | % 2010 | % 2020 |
|---|---|---|---|---|---|---|
| White alone (NH) | 32,675 | 35,432 | 32,362 | 86.87% | 80.88% | 76.56% |
| Black or African American alone (NH) | 270 | 415 | 351 | 0.72% | 0.95% | 0.83% |
| Native American or Alaska Native alone (NH) | 290 | 317 | 259 | 0.77% | 0.72% | 0.61% |
| Asian alone (NH) | 235 | 324 | 283 | 0.62% | 0.74% | 0.67% |
| Pacific Islander alone (NH) | 13 | 41 | 61 | 0.03% | 0.09% | 0.14% |
| Other race alone (NH) | 28 | 30 | 147 | 0.07% | 0.07% | 0.35% |
| Mixed -race or multiracial (NH) | 557 | 558 | 1,852 | 1.48% | 1.27% | 4.38% |
| Hispanic or Latino (any race) | 3,545 | 6,689 | 6,957 | 9.42% | 15.27% | 16.46% |
| Total | 37,613 | 43,806 | 42,272 | 100.00% | 100.00% | 100.00% |

The racial makeup of the county was 81.4% White, 0.9% Black or African American, 1.0% American Indian and Alaska Native, 0.7% Asian, 5.9% from some other race, and 10.0% from two or more races. Hispanic or Latino residents of any race comprised 16.5% of the population.

There were 16,625 households in the county, of which 34.0% had children under the age of 18 living with them and 20.4% had a female householder with no spouse or partner present. About 27.4% of all households were made up of individuals and 9.0% had someone living alone who was 65 years of age or older.

There were 19,145 housing units, of which 13.2% were vacant. Among occupied housing units, 71.7% were owner-occupied and 28.3% were renter-occupied. The homeowner vacancy rate was 2.3% and the rental vacancy rate was 21.2%.

=== 2010 census ===
As of the 2010 United States census, there were 43,806 people, 16,475 households, and 11,405 families in the county. The population density was 4.2 people per square mile (1.6 people/km^{2}). There were 18,735 housing units at an average density of 1.8 units per square mile (0.69 units/km^{2}). The racial makeup of the county was 88.5% white, 1.0% American Indian, 1.0% black or African American, 0.8% Asian, 0.1% Pacific islander, 6.4% from other races, and 2.3% from two or more races. Those of Hispanic or Latino origin made up 15.3% of the population. In terms of ancestry, 22.4% were German, 19.0% were English, 13.0% were Irish, 7.4% were Italian, and 4.4% were American.

Of the 16,475 households, 36.7% had children under the age of 18 living with them, 53.5% were married couples living together, 9.0% had a female householder with no husband present, 30.8% were non-families, and 24.0% of all households were made up of individuals. The average household size was 2.62 and the average family size was 3.09. The median age was 32.8 years.

The median income for a household in the county was $69,828 and the median income for a family was $79,527. Males had a median income of $65,174 versus $31,738 for females. The per capita income for the county was $30,961. About 6.1% of families and 8.2% of the population were below the poverty line, including 12.0% of those under age 18 and 5.0% of those age 65 or over.

=== 2000 census ===
As of the 2000 United States census, of 2000, there were 37,613 people, 14,105 households, and 10,099 families in the county. The population density was 4 people per square mile (1.5 people/km^{2}). There were 15,921 housing units at an average density of 2 units per square mile (0.77 units/km^{2}). The racial makeup of the county was 91.62% White, 0.73% Black or African American, 1.01% Native American, 0.64% Asian, 0.04% Pacific Islander, 3.59% from other races, and 2.37% from two or more races. 9.42% of the population were Hispanic or Latino of any race. 16.4% are of English, 16.2% German, 9% Irish and 5% Italian ancestry.

There were 14,105 households, out of which 38.20% had children under the age of 18 living with them, 57.80% were married couples living together, 9.20% had a female householder with no husband present, and 28.40% were non-families. 23.60% of all households were made up of individuals, and 6.90% had someone living alone who was 65 years of age or older. The average household size was 2.62 and the average family size was 3.11.

The county population contained 28.90% under the age of 18, 10.10% from 18 to 24, 29.30% from 25 to 44, 23.70% from 45 to 64, and 8.00% who were 65 years of age or older. The median age was 34 years. For every 100 females there were 102.40 males. For every 100 females age 18 and over, there were 101.10 males.

The median income for a household in the county was $46,537, and the median income for a family was $54,173. Males had a median income of $45,678 versus $22,440 for females. The per capita income for the county was $19,575. About 5.40% of families and 7.80% of the population were below the poverty line, including 9.20% of those under age 18 and 7.00% of those age 65 or over.

== Religion ==
Religion in Sweetwater County, according to ARDA (2020)
1. Catholic Church (21.1%)
2. LDS Church (14.7%)
3. Evangelical Churches (6.70%)
4. Mainline Protestant Churches (1.90%)
5. Orthodox Church (0.10%)
6. Others (0.60%)
7. None* (54.9%)
- "None" is an unclear category. It is a heterogenous group of the not religious and intermittently religious. Researchers argue that most of the "Nones" should be considered "unchurched", rather than objectively nonreligious; especially since most "Nones" do hold some religious-spiritual beliefs and a notable amount participate in behaviors. For example, 72% of American "Nones" believe in God or a higher power.

== Education ==
There are three school districts with portions of Sweetwater County: Sweetwater County School District Number 1, Sweetwater County School District Number 2, and Carbon County School District 1.

Some residents of Sweetwater County District 2 attend schools in the Daggett School District of Utah. DSD stated that, as per its agreement with Sweetwater County District 2, "DSD schools are the home school for all students living in Washam, Wyoming." Additionally, students in McKinnon, Wyoming may choose to attend DSD schools.

Sweetwater is also home to Western Wyoming Community College which is located in Rock Springs.

== Politics and government ==
Sweetwater County was a Democratic stronghold in Wyoming until recent years (owing to its unionized mining industry), voting Democratic in eleven consecutive presidential elections between 1928 and 1968, after supporting Progressive Robert La Follette Sr. in 1924. In 1928, 1952, 1956, and 1976, it was the only Wyoming county to support the Democratic presidential nominee.

Nonetheless, no Democratic presidential candidate has won Sweetwater County since Bill Clinton in 1996, and no Democrat has won a majority of its votes since Jimmy Carter in 1976. The county has come to mirror neighboring Wyoming counties in its powerful support of Republican candidates; in 2016, Hillary Clinton won just 18.9 percent of the vote in the county. The 2024 election saw the strongest Republican support in the county since statehood when it cast over 75% of its vote for Donald Trump. At the state level, Sweetwater County is represented by a Republican delegation in the Wyoming House of Representatives, and three Republicans in the Wyoming Senate.

United States presidential election results for Sweetwater County, Wyoming
| Year | Republican | | Democratic | | Third party(ies) | |
| Year | No. | % | No. | % | No. | % |
|---|---|---|---|---|---|---|
| 1892 | 674 | 47.03% | 0 | 0.00% | 759 | 52.97% |
| 1896 | 754 | 42.19% | 996 | 55.74% | 37 | 2.07% |
| 1900 | 1,101 | 59.80% | 740 | 40.20% | 0 | 0.00% |
| 1904 | 1,473 | 71.37% | 464 | 22.48% | 127 | 6.15% |
| 1908 | 1,299 | 58.49% | 637 | 28.68% | 285 | 12.83% |
| 1912 | 888 | 35.76% | 916 | 36.89% | 679 | 27.35% |
| 1916 | 1,287 | 43.79% | 1,496 | 50.90% | 156 | 5.31% |
| 1920 | 1,744 | 54.14% | 1,216 | 37.75% | 261 | 8.10% |
| 1924 | 2,119 | 42.16% | 688 | 13.69% | 2,219 | 44.15% |
| 1928 | 2,528 | 45.15% | 2,974 | 53.12% | 97 | 1.73% |
| 1932 | 2,043 | 29.26% | 4,637 | 66.40% | 303 | 4.34% |
| 1936 | 1,797 | 22.19% | 6,232 | 76.97% | 68 | 0.84% |
| 1940 | 2,439 | 26.82% | 6,637 | 72.98% | 18 | 0.20% |
| 1944 | 2,623 | 31.90% | 5,599 | 68.10% | 0 | 0.00% |
| 1948 | 2,538 | 31.39% | 5,146 | 63.65% | 401 | 4.96% |
| 1952 | 3,567 | 38.05% | 5,807 | 61.95% | 0 | 0.00% |
| 1956 | 3,355 | 41.41% | 4,747 | 58.59% | 0 | 0.00% |
| 1960 | 2,545 | 32.04% | 5,398 | 67.96% | 0 | 0.00% |
| 1964 | 1,944 | 24.57% | 5,969 | 75.43% | 0 | 0.00% |
| 1968 | 2,726 | 36.60% | 4,086 | 54.85% | 637 | 8.55% |
| 1972 | 5,175 | 58.05% | 3,713 | 41.65% | 27 | 0.30% |
| 1976 | 4,937 | 46.69% | 5,575 | 52.72% | 62 | 0.59% |
| 1980 | 6,265 | 51.92% | 4,728 | 39.18% | 1,074 | 8.90% |
| 1984 | 8,308 | 60.59% | 5,230 | 38.14% | 174 | 1.27% |
| 1988 | 6,780 | 49.47% | 6,720 | 49.03% | 205 | 1.50% |
| 1992 | 4,476 | 30.02% | 6,417 | 43.04% | 4,017 | 26.94% |
| 1996 | 5,591 | 35.76% | 7,088 | 45.34% | 2,955 | 18.90% |
| 2000 | 9,425 | 60.07% | 5,521 | 35.19% | 745 | 4.75% |
| 2004 | 10,653 | 65.47% | 5,208 | 32.01% | 411 | 2.53% |
| 2008 | 10,360 | 62.02% | 5,762 | 34.50% | 581 | 3.48% |
| 2012 | 11,428 | 67.64% | 4,774 | 28.26% | 693 | 4.10% |
| 2016 | 12,154 | 70.95% | 3,231 | 18.86% | 1,745 | 10.19% |
| 2020 | 12,229 | 73.66% | 3,823 | 23.03% | 551 | 3.32% |
| 2024 | 12,541 | 75.10% | 3,731 | 22.34% | 426 | 2.55% |

County commissioners

| Name | Party | Term |
|---|---|---|
| Keaton West (chair) | Republican | 2022- |
| Island Richards | Republican | 2022- |
| Mary Thoman | Republican | 2020- |
| Taylor Jones | Republican | 2021- |
| Robb Slaughter | Republican | 2022- |

== Communities ==
=== Cities ===
- Green River (county seat)
- Rock Springs

=== Towns ===
- Bairoil
- Granger
- Superior
- Wamsutter

=== Census-designated places ===
- Arrowhead Springs
- Clearview Acres
- Eden
- Farson
- James Town
- Little America
- McKinnon
- North Rock Springs
- Point of Rocks
- Purple Sage
- Reliance
- Table Rock
- Washam

=== Other unincorporated communities ===
- Blairtown
- Creston
- Quealy
- Red Desert
- Riner
- Sweeney Ranch

=== Ghost towns ===
- Bryan
- Linwood (mostly within the State of Utah)
- Table Rock
- Winton

== Media ==
=== Print ===
Sweetwater County is served by two print publications: Rock Springs Daily Rocket-Miner and The Green River Star (a weekly newspaper published in Green River).

=== Hyperlocal websites ===
Sweetwater County is served by two hyperlocal news websites, SweetwaterNOW.com and wyo4news.com.

== See also ==
- National Register of Historic Places listings in Sweetwater County, Wyoming
- Wyoming
  - List of cities and towns in Wyoming
  - List of counties in Wyoming
  - Wyoming statistical areas
