= 2020 United States presidential election in Wyoming =

- November 3, 2020
- Turnout: 62.6% (▲4.79 pp)

Nominee	Donald Trump	Joe Biden
Party	Republican	Democratic
Home state	Florida	Delaware
Running mate	Mike Pence	Kamala Harris
Electoral vote	3	0
Popular vote	193,559	73,491
Percentage	69.94%	26.55%

Trump
40–50%
50–60%
60–70%
70–80%
80–90%
90–100%
Biden
40–50%
50–60%
60–70%
70–80%
80–90%
Tie/No Data
President before election
Donald Trump
Republican
Elected President
Joe Biden
Democratic

The 2020 United States presidential election in Wyoming was held on Tuesday, November 3, 2020, as part of the 2020 United States presidential election in which all 50 states and the District of Columbia participated. Wyoming voters chose electors to represent them in the Electoral College via a popular vote, pitting the Republican Party's nominee, incumbent President Donald Trump and running mate Vice President Mike Pence, against Democratic Party nominee, former Vice President Joe Biden and his running mate California Senator Kamala Harris. Wyoming has three electoral votes in the Electoral College. Trump, the Republican nominee and incumbent president of the United States, won the state's three electoral votes.

Trump routed Biden in Wyoming, with his 69.94% vote share there making it his strongest win in the election. He won the sparsely populated state by a margin of 43.39%, down from his 46.29% four years earlier. Prior to the election, all news organizations declared Wyoming a safe red state, therefore justifying its status as one of the safest red states in the country, not being won by a Democrat since Lyndon B. Johnson's 1964 landslide victory. Trump's 69.94% of the vote is the third-highest ever by a presidential candidate in Wyoming, only surpassed by Ronald Reagan's 70.51% during his 1984 landslide and by Trump's 71.60% in 2024.

Despite his loss, Biden scored a landslide win in Teton County, garnering a larger vote share in it than any nominee since 1984. He also narrowly flipped the bellwether of Albany County, anchored by the college town of Laramie, which had supported Obama in 2008 before returning to the Republican Party in 2012 and 2016, albeit by a narrow margin. Per exit polls by the Associated Press, Trump's strength in Wyoming came from white people, who comprised 89% of the electorate, and from voters prioritizing energy policy, with 62% believing the government should focus on expanding production of fossil fuels such as oil, gas, or coal.

== Caucuses ==
=== Democratic caucuses ===
The Democratic caucuses were originally scheduled for April 4, 2020. On March 22, due to concerns over the COVID-19 pandemic, the Wyoming Democratic Party canceled in-person voting in favor of mail-in voting. The deadline was also extended to April 17.

2020 Wyoming Democratic presidential caucuses
Candidate	Votes	%	Delegates
Joe Biden	10,912	72.2%	12
Bernie Sanders (suspended)	4,206	27.8%	2
Total	15,118	100%	14

=== Republican caucuses ===
The Republican state party convention was held in May to officially select the final delegates to the national convention. Trump won all 29 delegates from Wyoming: 12 at the county conventions and 17 at the state convention.

== General election ==
=== Predictions ===
Source	Ranking	As of
The Cook Political Report	Safe R	November 3, 2020
Inside Elections	Safe R	November 3, 2020
Sabato's Crystal Ball	Safe R	November 3, 2020
Politico	Safe R	November 3, 2020
RCP	Safe R	November 3, 2020
Niskanen	Safe R	November 3, 2020
CNN	Safe R	November 3, 2020
The Economist	Safe R	November 3, 2020
CBS News	Likely R	November 3, 2020
270towin	Safe R	November 3, 2020
ABC News	Safe R	November 3, 2020
NPR	Likely R	November 3, 2020
NBC News	Safe R	November 3, 2020
538	Safe R	November 3, 2020

=== Polling ===
==== Graphical summary ====
View source data.

==== Aggregate polls ====
Source of poll aggregation	Dates updated	Joe Biden Democratic	Donald Trump Republican	Other/ Undecided (Note: Calculated by taking the difference of 100% and all other candidates combined.)	Margin
FiveThirtyEight	November 3, 2020	30.8%	62.3%	6.9%	Trump +31.5

==== Polls ====
Polls with a sample size of <100 have their sample size entries marked in red to indicate a lack of reliability.

Poll source	Date(s) administered	Sample size (Note: Key: A – all adults RV – registered voters LV – likely voters V – unclear)	Margin of error	Donald Trump Republican	Joe Biden Democratic	Jo Jorgensen Libertarian	Other	Undecided
SurveyMonkey/Axios	Oct 20 – Nov 2, 2020	367 (LV)	± 7%	66% (Note: Overlapping sample with the previous SurveyMonkey/Axios poll, but more information available regarding sample size)	33%	–	–	–
University of Wyoming	Oct 8–28, 2020	614 (LV)	± 4%	59%	31%	5%	–	–
SurveyMonkey/Axios	Oct 1–28, 2020	739 (LV)	–	68%	31%	–	–	–
SurveyMonkey/Axios	Sep 1–30, 2020	236 (LV)	–	65%	34%	–	–	1%
SurveyMonkey/Axios	Aug 1–31, 2020	211 (LV)	–	74%	25%	–	–	1%
SurveyMonkey/Axios	Jul 1–31, 2020	246 (LV)	–	70%	28%	–	–	2%
SurveyMonkey/Axios	Jun 8–30, 2020	98 (LV)	–	78%	22%	–	–	0%

=== Electoral slates ===
These slates of electors were nominated by each party in order to vote in the Electoral College should their candidate win the state:

Donald Trump and Mike Pence Republican Party	Joe Biden and Kamala Harris Democratic Party	Jo Jorgensen and Spike Cohen Libertarian Party	Don Blankenship and William Mohr Constitution Party	Brock Pierce and Karla Ballard Independent
Marti Halverson; Doug Chamberlain; Karl Allred	Kelly Tamblyn; Andrea Clifford; Milward Simpson	Shawn Johnson; Jared Baldes; Richard Brubaker	Cindy Haggett; Michael O'Brien; Nanette Hinck	Luke Onderko; Joann Dawn Grisham; Elizabeth Batton

=== Results ===
2020 United States presidential election in Wyoming
Party	Candidate	Votes	%	±%
Republican	Donald Trump (incumbent) Mike Pence (incumbent)	193,559	69.94%	+2.54%
Democratic	Joe Biden Kamala Harris	73,491	26.55%	+4.92%
Libertarian	Jo Jorgensen Spike Cohen	5,768	2.08%	−3.05%
Independent	Brock Pierce Karla Ballard	2,208	0.80%	N/A
Write-in		1,739	0.63%	−2.04%
Total votes		276,765	100.00%	
Republican win				

==== By county ====
County	Donald Trump Republican		Joe Biden Democratic		Various candidates Other parties		Margin		Total votes cast
County	#	%	#	%	#	%	#	%	Total votes cast
Albany	8,579	46.08%	9,092	48.84%	946	5.09%	-513	-2.76%	18,617
Big Horn	4,806	83.55%	788	13.70%	158	2.75%	4,018	69.85%	5,752
Campbell	16,975	86.76%	1,935	9.89%	656	3.35%	15,040	76.87%	19,566
Carbon	5,014	75.24%	1,427	21.41%	223	3.35%	3,587	53.83%	6,664
Converse	5,917	84.89%	861	12.35%	192	2.76%	5,056	72.54%	6,970
Crook	3,651	88.64%	378	9.18%	90	2.18%	3,273	79.46%	4,119
Fremont	12,007	66.30%	5,519	30.47%	585	3.23%	6,488	35.83%	18,111
Goshen	4,878	78.16%	1,203	19.28%	160	2.57%	3,675	58.88%	6,241
Hot Springs	1,999	77.57%	482	18.70%	96	3.73%	1,517	58.87%	2,577
Johnson	3,881	78.98%	897	18.25%	136	2.77%	2,984	60.73%	4,914
Laramie	27,891	62.00%	15,217	33.83%	1,874	4.16%	12,674	28.17%	44,982
Lincoln	8,643	82.57%	1,509	14.42%	316	3.03%	7,134	68.15%	10,468
Natrona	25,271	71.79%	8,530	24.23%	1,401	3.98%	16,741	47.56%	35,202
Niobrara	1,118	85.47%	155	11.85%	35	2.68%	963	73.62%	1,308
Park	12,813	76.65%	3,410	20.40%	494	2.96%	9,403	56.25%	16,717
Platte	3,898	79.18%	890	18.08%	135	2.75%	3,008	61.10%	4,923
Sheridan	11,843	72.09%	4,043	24.61%	542	3.29%	7,800	47.48%	16,428
Sublette	3,957	79.62%	882	17.75%	131	2.63%	3,075	61.87%	4,970
Sweetwater	12,229	73.66%	3,823	23.03%	551	3.32%	8,406	50.63%	16,603
Teton	4,341	29.58%	9,848	67.10%	488	3.33%	-5,507	-37.52%	14,677
Uinta	7,496	79.73%	1,591	16.92%	315	3.35%	5,905	62.81%	9,402
Washakie	3,245	80.88%	651	16.23%	116	2.89%	2,594	64.65%	4,012
Weston	3,107	87.72%	360	10.16%	75	2.11%	2,747	77.56%	3,542
Totals	193,559	69.94%	73,491	26.55%	9,715	3.51%	120,068	43.39%	276,765

County that flipped from Republican to Democratic

- Albany (largest municipality: Laramie)

==== By congressional district ====
Due to the state's low population, only one congressional district is allocated. This district is called the at-large district, because it covers the entire state, and thus is equivalent to the statewide election results.

District	Trump	Biden	Representative
At-large	69.94%	26.55%	Liz Cheney

== See also ==
- United States presidential elections in Wyoming
- Presidency of Joe Biden
- 2020 United States presidential election
- 2020 Democratic Party presidential primaries
- 2020 Libertarian Party presidential primaries
- 2020 Republican Party presidential primaries
- 2020 United States elections
