= 2004 United States presidential election in Wyoming =

- November 2, 2004
- Turnout: 64.1% (of voting age population)

Nominee	George W. Bush	John Kerry
Party	Republican	Democratic
Home state	Texas	Massachusetts
Running mate	Dick Cheney	John Edwards
Electoral vote	3	0
Popular vote	167,629	70,776
Percentage	68.86%	29.07%
County results
Bush
50–60%
60–70%
70–80%
80–90%
Kerry
50–60%
President before election
George W. Bush
Republican
Elected President
George W. Bush
Republican

The 2004 United States presidential election in Wyoming took place on November 2, 2004, and was part of the 2004 United States presidential election. Voters chose three representatives, or electors to the Electoral College, who voted for president and vice president.

Wyoming was won by incumbent President George W. Bush by a 39.8% margin of victory. Prior to the election, all 12 news organizations considered this a state Bush would win, or otherwise considered as a safe red state. This was based on pre-election polling, the fact that the last Democrat to win here was Lyndon B. Johnson in 1964, the presence of Wyoming native Dick Cheney on the ticket, and how Bush carried this state in 2000 with almost 68% of the vote. On election day Bush won every county with over 65% except for Teton County, which Kerry won with 53% and Albany County, which Bush won with 54% of the vote. Bush thus became the first ever Republican to win the White House without carrying Teton County.

With 68.86% of the popular vote, Wyoming would prove to be Bush's second strongest state in the 2004 election after neighboring Utah.

== Caucuses ==
- 2004 Wyoming Democratic presidential caucuses

== Campaign ==
=== Predictions ===
There were 12 news organizations who made state-by-state predictions of the election. Here are their last predictions before election day.

Source	Ranking
D.C. Political Report	Solid R
Associated Press	Solid R
CNN	Likely R
Cook Political Report	Solid R
Newsweek	Solid R
New York Times	Solid R
Rasmussen Reports	Likely R
Research 2000	Solid R
Washington Post	Likely R
Washington Times	Solid R
Zogby International	Likely R
Washington Dispatch	Likely R

=== Polling ===
Only one pre-election poll was conducted. It showed Bush leading Kerry 65% to 29%.

=== Fundraising ===
Bush raised $531,380. Kerry raised $466,535.

=== Advertising and visits ===
Neither campaign advertised or visited this state during the fall campaign.

== Analysis ==
Wyoming is a Republican bastion. The last Democrat to win a senate election was Gale W. McGee in 1970. The last Democrat to win the at-large House seat was Teno Roncalio in 1976. The last time the Democrats controlled the Wyoming House of Representatives was 1966. The last time Democrats controlled the Wyoming Senate was 1938. The state, however, did continuously have Democratic governors from 1975 to 2011 with only an eight-year interruption of Jim Geringer's tenure from 1995 to 2003.

In presidential elections, Wyoming is one of the most reliable red states in the country. The last Democrat to carry the state, or even crack the 40% mark, was LBJ in 1964, and before that was Harry S. Truman in 1948. Since 1968, every Republican carried this state by a double-digit margin of victory, except in 1992. As far as popular vote percentage, the 2004 results were the third best performance by the Republican party since 1964, behind only Richard Nixon (69.0%) in 1972 and Ronald Reagan (70.5%) in 1984. With regards to the margin of victory, the 2004 election (at 39.8%) was also the third best performance, behind only George W. Bush (40.1%) in 2000 and Ronald Reagan (42.3%) in 1984.

CNN exit polls showed 72% of the state approved of Bush, and 69% approved of his decision to go to war.

== Results ==
2004 United States presidential election in Wyoming
Party	Candidate	Running mate	Votes	Percentage	Electoral votes
Republican	George W. Bush (Inc.)	Dick Cheney (incumbent)	167,629	68.86%	3
Democratic	John Kerry	John Edwards	70,776	29.07%	0
Independent	Ralph Nader	Peter Camejo	2,741	1.13%	0
Libertarian	Michael Badnarik	Richard Campagna	1,171	0.48%	0
Independent	Michael Peroutka	Chuck Baldwin	631	0.26%	0
Write Ins			480	0.20%	0
Totals			243,428	100.00%	3
Voter turnout (Voting age population)					64.1%

=== By county ===
County	George W. Bush Republican		John Kerry Democratic		Various candidates Other parties		Margin		Total votes cast
County	#	%	#	%	#	%	#	%	Total votes cast
Albany	9,006	54.17%	7,117	42.81%	501	3.01%	1,889	11.36%	16,624
Big Horn	4,232	80.11%	960	18.17%	91	1.72%	3,272	61.94%	5,283
Campbell	12,415	82.22%	2,464	16.32%	220	1.46%	9,951	65.90%	15,099
Carbon	4,758	67.23%	2,158	30.49%	161	2.27%	2,600	36.74%	7,077
Converse	4,447	77.68%	1,184	20.68%	94	1.64%	3,263	57.00%	5,725
Crook	2,836	83.51%	501	14.75%	59	1.74%	2,335	68.76%	3,396
Fremont	11,429	66.85%	5,338	31.22%	329	1.92%	6,091	35.63%	17,096
Goshen	4,114	71.19%	1,566	27.10%	99	1.71%	2,548	44.09%	5,779
Hot Springs	1,812	73.06%	623	25.12%	45	1.81%	1,189	47.94%	2,480
Johnson	3,231	80.96%	676	16.94%	84	2.10%	2,555	64.02%	3,991
Laramie	25,951	65.07%	13,171	33.03%	757	1.90%	12,780	32.04%	39,879
Lincoln	6,423	81.16%	1,364	17.24%	127	1.60%	5,059	63.92%	7,914
Natrona	21,512	67.08%	9,863	30.76%	693	2.16%	11,649	36.32%	32,068
Niobrara	1,064	80.97%	230	17.50%	20	1.52%	834	63.47%	1,314
Park	10,917	76.71%	3,007	21.13%	307	2.16%	7,910	55.58%	14,231
Platte	3,149	68.85%	1,328	29.03%	97	2.12%	1,821	39.82%	4,574
Sheridan	9,689	69.06%	4,066	28.98%	274	1.95%	5,623	40.08%	14,029
Sublette	2,847	77.98%	730	19.99%	74	2.03%	2,117	57.99%	3,651
Sweetwater	10,653	65.47%	5,208	32.01%	411	2.53%	5,445	33.46%	16,272
Teton	5,124	45.11%	5,972	52.58%	263	2.32%	-848	-7.47%	11,359
Uinta	6,081	75.25%	1,815	22.46%	185	2.29%	4,266	52.79%	8,081
Washakie	3,200	77.78%	855	20.78%	59	1.43%	2,345	57.00%	4,114
Weston	2,739	80.75%	580	17.10%	73	2.15%	2,159	63.65%	3,392
Total	167,629	68.86%	70,776	29.07%	5,023	2.07%	96,853	39.79%	243,428

==== Counties that flipped from Republican to Democratic ====
- Teton (largest city: Jackson)

=== By congressional district ===
Due to the state's low population, only one congressional district is allocated. This district, called the at-large district, because it covers the entire state, and thus is equivalent to the statewide election results.

District	Bush	Kerry	Representative
At-large	68.9%	29.1%	Barbara Cubin

== Electors ==
Technically the voters of Wyoming cast their ballots for electors: representatives to the Electoral College. Wyoming is allocated three electors because it has one congressional districts and two senators. All candidates who appear on the ballot or qualify to receive write-in votes must submit a list of three electors, who pledge to vote for their candidate and their running mate. Whoever wins the majority of votes in the state is awarded all three electoral votes. Their chosen electors then vote for president and vice president. Although electors are pledged to their candidate and running mate, they are not obligated to vote for them. An elector who votes for someone other than their candidate is known as a faithless elector.

The electors of each state and the District of Columbia met on December 13, 2004, to cast their votes for president and vice president. The Electoral College itself never meets as one body. Instead the electors from each state and the District of Columbia met in their respective capitols.

The following were the members of the Electoral College from the state. All three were pledged for Bush/Cheney.

1. Linda Barker
2. Jack Van Mark
3. Mike Baker

== See also ==
- United States presidential elections in Wyoming
- Presidency of George W. Bush
