= 1916 United States presidential election in Wyoming =

- November 7, 1916

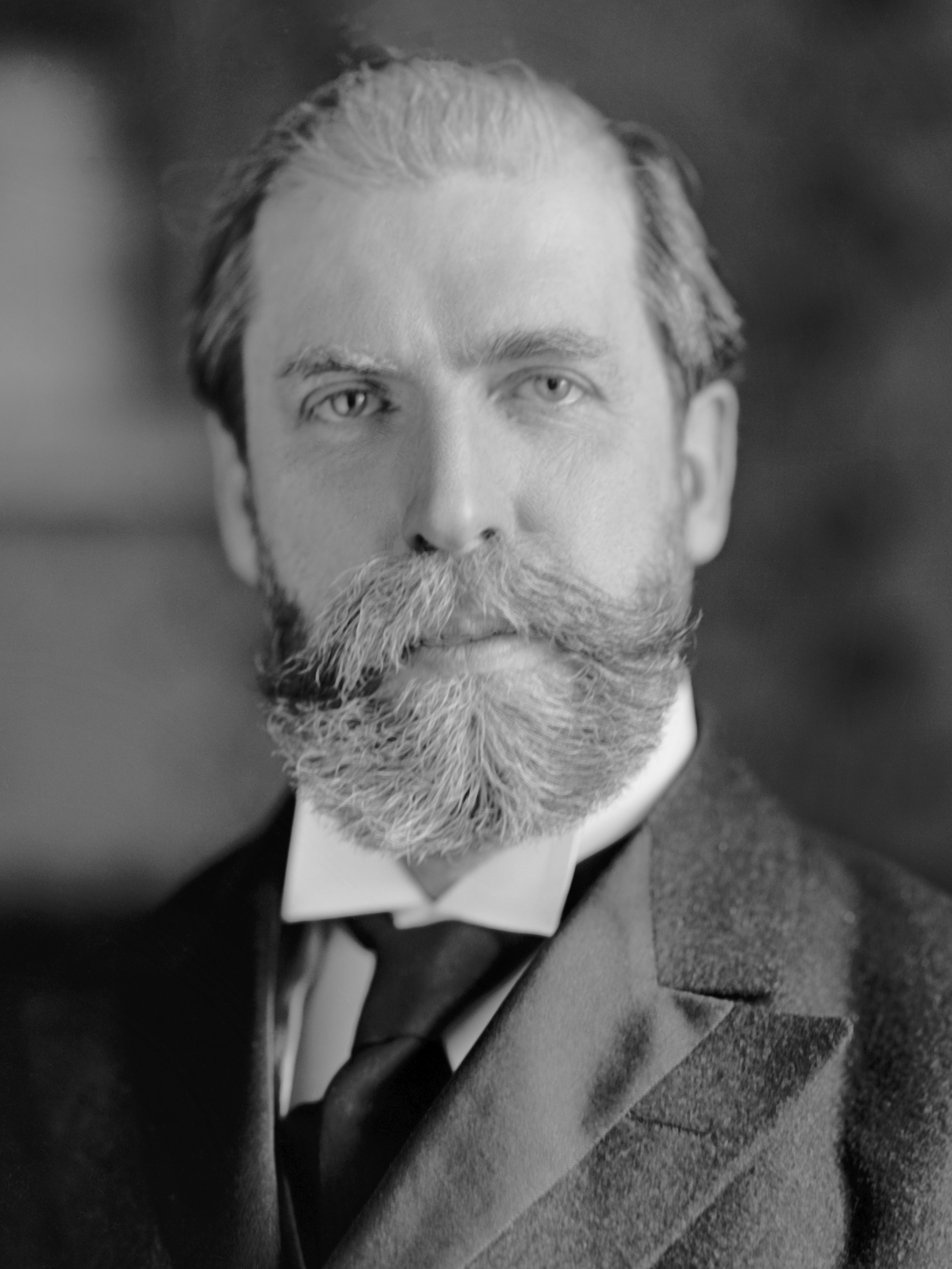
Nominee	Woodrow Wilson	Charles Evans Hughes
Party	Democratic	Republican
Home state	New Jersey	New York
Running mate	Thomas R. Marshall	Charles W. Fairbanks
Electoral vote	3	0
Popular vote	28,376	21,698
Percentage	54.67%	41.80%
County results
Wilson
40–50%
50–60%
60–70%
Hughes
40–50%
President before election
Woodrow Wilson
Democratic
Elected President
Woodrow Wilson
Democratic

The 1916 United States presidential election in Wyoming took place on November 7, 1916, as part of the 1916 United States presidential election. State voters chose three representatives, or electors, to the Electoral College, who voted for president and vice president.

In 1912, Wyoming had been the eighth-best state for embattled Republican nominee William Howard Taft. However, in contrast to the East where supporters of Theodore Roosevelt's Progressive "Bull Moose" Party rapidly returned to the Republicans, in the Mountain States many if not most of these supporters turned to the Democratic Party not only in presidential elections, but also in state and federal legislative ones. Another factor helping President Woodrow Wilson was a powerful "peace vote" in the Western states due to opposition to participation in World War I, and a third was that a considerable part of the substantial vote for Eugene Debs from the previous election was turned over to Wilson owing to such Progressive reforms as the Sixteenth and Seventeenth Amendments.

Consequently, Wilson was able not merely to hold Wyoming from 1912, but to increase his margin by over ten percentage points to carry the state by 12.87 percent. This is the third best Democratic performance in the history of presidential elections in Wyoming, behind Franklin Delano Roosevelt's landslide wins in 1932 and 1936. Wilson became the first Democratic presidential candidate to carry the counties of Carbon, Converse, Lincoln, Natrona, Niobrara, and Washakie. As of the 2024 presidential election, this election is the last time Wyoming has voted more Democratic than the nation at-large.

== Results ==
General Election Results
Party	Pledged to	Elector	Votes
Democratic Party	Woodrow Wilson	John L. Jordan	28,376
Democratic Party	Woodrow Wilson	James P. Smith	28,062
Democratic Party	Woodrow Wilson	Alfred M. Brock	27,990
Republican Party	Charles Evans Hughes	John L. Baird	21,698
Republican Party	Charles Evans Hughes	W. E. Chpalin	21,433
Republican Party	Charles Evans Hughes	Jacob A. Delfelder	21,198
Socialist Party	Allan Benson	Matilda Hautamaki	1,459
Socialist Party	Allan Benson	Joseph Dunning	1,434
Socialist Party	Allan Benson	W. S. Oeland	1,424
Prohibition Party	Frank Hanly	C. J. Sawyer	373
Prohibition Party	Frank Hanly	Ella Watson	364
Prohibition Party	Frank Hanly	Luther J. Wood	354
Votes cast (Note: Based on totals for highest elector on each ticket)			51,906

=== Results by county ===
County	Woodrow Wilson Democratic		Charles Evans Hughes Republican		Allan Benson Socialist		Frank Hanly Prohibition		Margin		Total votes cast (Note: Based on highest elector on each ticket)
County	#	%	#	%	#	%	#	%	#	%	Total votes cast
Albany	1,571	52.45%	1,313	43.84%	73	2.44%	38	1.27%	258	8.61%	2,995
Big Horn	1,493	53.92%	1,239	44.75%	29	1.05%	8	0.29%	254	9.17%	2,769
Campbell	690	59.48%	448	38.62%	12	1.03%	10	0.86%	242	20.86%	1,160
Carbon	1,661	54.58%	1,217	39.99%	155	5.09%	10	0.33%	444	14.59%	3,043
Converse	879	52.32%	766	45.60%	20	1.19%	15	0.89%	113	6.73%	1,680
Crook	1,181	56.59%	846	40.54%	51	2.44%	9	0.43%	335	16.05%	2,087
Fremont	1,752	53.89%	1,407	43.28%	75	2.31%	17	0.52%	345	10.61%	3,251
Goshen	1,096	56.61%	770	39.77%	49	2.53%	21	1.08%	326	16.84%	1,936
Hot Springs	760	54.25%	523	37.33%	95	6.78%	23	1.64%	237	16.92%	1,401
Johnson	812	49.03%	814	49.15%	28	1.69%	2	0.12%	-2	-0.12%	1,656
Laramie	2,759	51.80%	2,428	45.59%	84	1.58%	55	1.03%	331	6.21%	5,326
Lincoln	2,378	60.11%	1,426	36.05%	142	3.59%	10	0.25%	952	24.06%	3,956
Natrona	1,377	59.17%	912	39.19%	30	1.29%	8	0.34%	465	19.98%	2,327
Niobrara	599	51.28%	533	45.63%	14	1.20%	22	1.88%	66	5.65%	1,168
Park	1,181	49.96%	1,092	46.19%	69	2.92%	22	0.93%	89	3.76%	2,364
Platte	1,302	58.54%	806	36.24%	63	2.83%	53	2.38%	496	22.30%	2,224
Sheridan	2,906	57.57%	1,914	37.92%	205	4.06%	23	0.46%	992	19.65%	5,048
Sweetwater	1,496	50.90%	1,287	43.79%	152	5.17%	4	0.14%	209	7.11%	2,939
Uinta	1,295	59.57%	822	37.81%	51	2.35%	6	0.28%	473	21.76%	2,174
Washakie	455	55.62%	344	42.05%	16	1.96%	3	0.37%	111	13.57%	818
Weston	733	46.28%	791	49.94%	46	2.90%	14	0.88%	-58	-3.66%	1,584
Totals	28,376	54.67%	21,698	41.80%	1,459	2.81%	373	0.72%	6,678	12.87%	51,906

==== Counties that flipped from Republican to Democratic ====
- Big Horn
- Carbon
- Converse
- Lincoln
- Natrona
- Niobrara
- Uinta
- Washakie

==== Counties that flipped from Democratic to Republican ====
- Johnson
- Weston

== See also ==
- United States presidential elections in Wyoming
