= 1928 United States presidential election in Wyoming =

- November 6, 1928

Nominee	Herbert Hoover	Al Smith
Party	Republican	Democratic
Home state	Iowa	New York
Running mate	Charles Curtis	Joseph Robinson
Electoral vote	3	0
Popular vote	52,748	29,299
Percentage	63.68%	35.37%
County results
Hoover
50–60%
60–70%
70–80%
Smith
50–60%
President before election
Calvin Coolidge
Republican
Elected President
Herbert Hoover
Republican

The 1928 United States presidential election in Wyoming took place on November 6, 1928, as part of the 1928 United States presidential election. State voters chose three representatives, or electors, to the Electoral College, who voted for president and vice president.

Wyoming was won by the Republican candidate, former Secretary of Commerce and mining engineer Herbert Hoover, from the state of California, who was running with Senator Charles Curtis, with 63.68 percent of the popular vote. They ran against the Democratic candidate, Governor of New York Al Smith, running with Arkansas Senator and former Governor Joseph Robinson, with 35.37 percent, a 28.3% margin of victory. Hoover won all but one of the state's twenty-three counties, but Smith's victory in Sweetwater County – which had defied the 1924 GOP landslide by voting for Robert La Follette – would, with the aid of extensive unionization, create a run of Democratic wins in that county extending to 1968.

Just 4 years earlier, Hoover's predecessor, Calvin Coolidge, had carried Wyoming by 20.9% against his nearest rival, Progressive Robert M. La Follette; however, in that election, the vote was split, with the combined Progressive and Democratic vote total equaling 47.6%, thus giving Coolidge, who received 52.4% of the vote, a victory margin of 4.8%. Hoover's 28.3-point victory marked a swing to the right of 23.5 points, with Wyoming voting 10.9% more Republican than the rest of the nation in this election.

Voters associated the booming economy of The Roaring Twenties under Coolidge with Republicans, thus giving Hoover a significant edge in the campaign. In addition to facing an uphill battle to convince voters to abandon the popular Republican policies, Smith, a Roman Catholic, also dealt with significant anti-Catholic prejudice, with many Protestants believing he would take orders from The Pope, and some even believing the Pope would move to Washington D.C. if Smith won. Additionally, Smith's opposition to Prohibition, which was the ban on alcoholic beverages, and his association with the corruption of Tammany Hall all but ensured his defeat. His performance was the second worst for a Democrat in Wyoming's history at that time, being surpassed only by James Cox's defeat to Warren Harding in 1920, and would remain the second worst until George McGovern's landslide defeat in 1972.

Despite his strong performance, over the course of his presidency, the economic boom of the 1920s that had propelled Republicans to success would transform into The Great Depression, which voters associated with Hoover, and he would go on to lose the state by 16 points to Franklin D. Roosevelt in 1932. Hoover's raw vote total was the highest for a Republican in Wyoming's history up until that point, and would remain so until Dwight Eisenhower surpassed it in 1952.

== Results ==
1928 United States presidential election in Wyoming
Party	Candidate	Votes	%
Republican	Herbert Hoover	52,748	63.68%
Democratic	Alfred E. Smith	29,299	35.37%
Socialist	Norman Thomas	788	0.95%
Total votes		82,835	100.00%

=== Results by county ===
County	Herbert Hoover Republican		Al Smith Democratic		Norman Thomas Socialist		Margin		Total votes cast
County	#	%	#	%	#	%	#	%	Total votes cast
Albany	2,941	64.13%	1,618	35.28%	27	0.59%	1,323	28.85%	4,586
Big Horn	2,646	73.58%	933	25.95%	17	0.47%	1,713	47.63%	3,596
Campbell	1,528	66.52%	744	32.39%	25	1.09%	784	34.13%	2,297
Carbon	3,019	64.85%	1,609	34.56%	27	0.58%	1,410	30.29%	4,655
Converse	2,040	70.52%	845	29.21%	8	0.28%	1,195	41.31%	2,893
Crook	1,466	71.41%	582	28.35%	5	0.24%	884	43.06%	2,053
Fremont	2,267	60.65%	1,449	38.76%	22	0.59%	818	21.89%	3,738
Goshen	2,483	75.29%	777	23.56%	38	1.15%	1,706	51.73%	3,298
Hot Springs	1,220	55.33%	940	42.63%	45	2.04%	280	12.70%	2,205
Johnson	1,369	69.25%	590	29.84%	18	0.91%	779	39.41%	1,977
Laramie	5,862	65.33%	3,029	33.76%	82	0.91%	2,833	31.57%	8,973
Lincoln	2,217	56.57%	1,687	43.05%	15	0.38%	530	13.52%	3,919
Natrona	7,141	64.78%	3,818	34.64%	64	0.58%	3,323	30.14%	11,023
Niobrara	1,424	74.21%	469	24.44%	26	1.35%	955	49.77%	1,919
Park	2,175	66.72%	1,062	32.58%	23	0.71%	1,113	34.14%	3,260
Platte	2,206	67.75%	932	28.62%	118	3.62%	1,274	39.13%	3,256
Sheridan	3,616	57.86%	2,563	41.01%	71	1.14%	1,053	16.85%	6,250
Sublette	573	64.02%	316	35.31%	6	0.67%	257	28.72%	895
Sweetwater	2,528	45.15%	2,974	53.12%	97	1.73%	-446	-7.97%	5,599
Teton	495	64.29%	270	35.06%	5	0.65%	225	29.23%	770
Uinta	1,439	58.31%	1,012	41.00%	17	0.69%	427	17.31%	2,468
Washakie	966	70.72%	392	28.70%	8	0.59%	574	42.02%	1,366
Weston	1,127	61.28%	688	37.41%	24	1.31%	439	23.87%	1,839
Totals	52,748	63.68%	29,299	35.37%	788	0.95%	23,449	28.31%	82,835

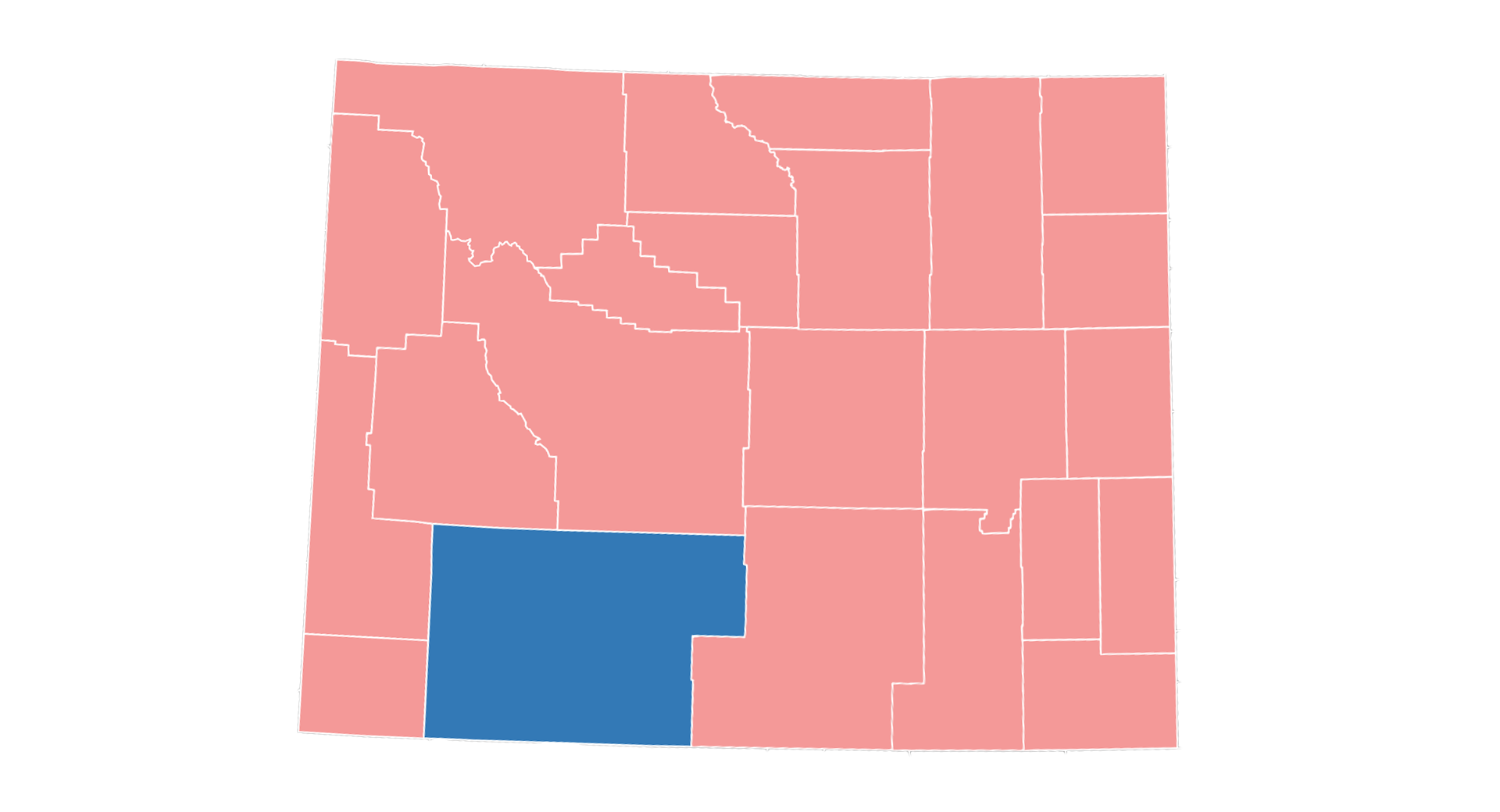
County flips from 1924: Democratic Hold Gain from Progressive / Republican Hold

==== Counties that flipped from Progressive to Democratic ====
- Sweetwater

== See also ==
- United States presidential elections in Wyoming
