= 1980 United States presidential election in Wyoming =

- November 4, 1980

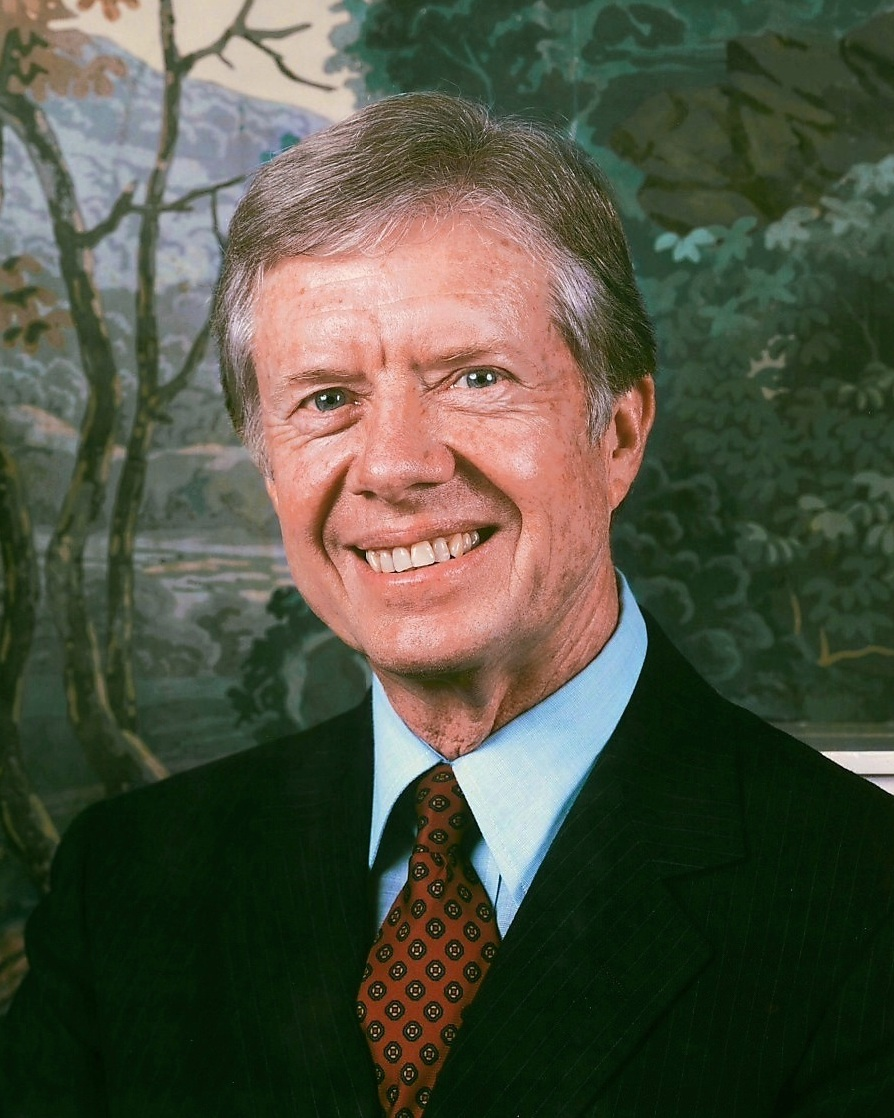

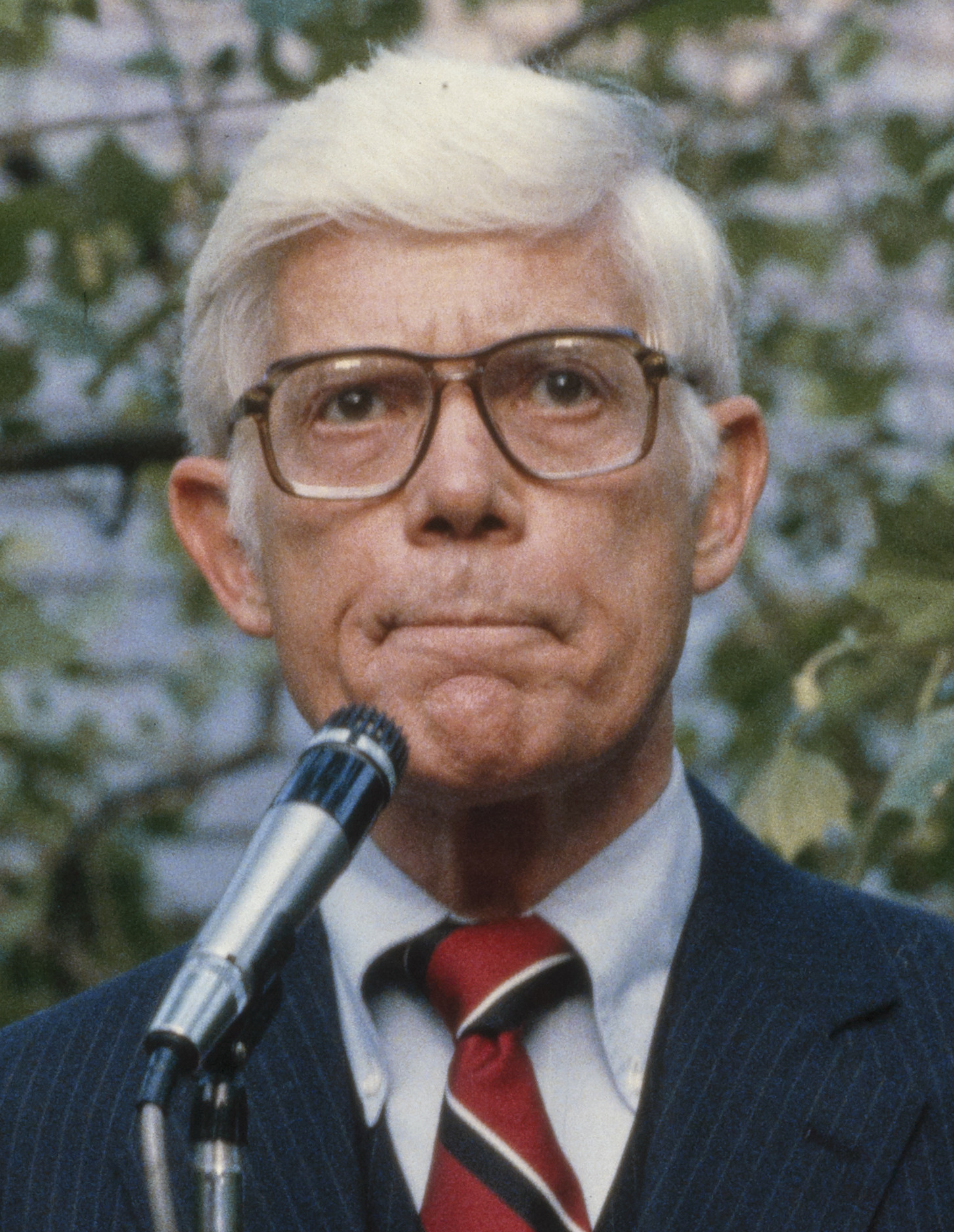
Nominee	Ronald Reagan	Jimmy Carter	John B. Anderson
Party	Republican	Democratic	Independent
Home state	California	Georgia	Illinois
Running mate	George H. W. Bush	Walter Mondale	Patrick Lucey
Electoral vote	3	0	0
Popular vote	110,700	49,427	12,072
Percentage	62.64%	27.97%	6.83%
County results
Reagan
50–60%
60–70%
70–80%
President before election
Jimmy Carter
Democratic
Elected President
Ronald Reagan
Republican

The 1980 United States presidential election in Wyoming took place on November 4, 1980. All 50 states and The District of Columbia were part of the 1980 United States presidential election. State voters chose three electors to the Electoral College, who voted for president and vice president.

Wyoming was won by former California Governor Ronald Reagan (R) by a 34-point landslide. Wyoming is a reliably Republican state, and the last Democratic presidential candidate to carry the state was Lyndon Johnson in 1964.

With 62.64% of the popular vote, Wyoming would prove to be Reagan's fifth strongest state in the 1980 election after Utah, Idaho, Nebraska and North Dakota.

== Results ==
1980 United States presidential election in Wyoming
Party	Candidate	Votes	Percentage	Electoral votes
Republican	Ronald Reagan	110,700	62.64%	3
Democrat	Jimmy Carter (incumbent)	49,427	27.97%	0
Independent	John Anderson	12,072	6.83%	0
Independent	Edward Clark	4,514	2.55%	0
Totals		176,716	100.00%	3
Voter turnout (Voting age/Registered voters)				53%/81%

=== Results by county ===
County	Ronald Reagan Republican		Jimmy Carter Democratic		John B. Anderson Independent		Ed Clark Independent		Margin		Total
County	#	%	#	%	#	%	#	%	#	%	Total
Albany	5,830	50.58%	3,772	32.72%	1,630	14.14%	295	2.56%	2,058	17.86%	11,527
Big Horn	3,709	71.01%	1,212	23.21%	209	4.00%	93	1.78%	2,497	47.80%	5,223
Campbell	5,613	73.19%	1,400	18.26%	460	6.00%	196	2.56%	4,213	54.93%	7,669
Carbon	4,337	59.55%	2,272	31.20%	493	6.77%	181	2.49%	2,065	28.35%	7,283
Converse	2,987	70.63%	922	21.80%	215	5.08%	105	2.48%	2,065	48.83%	4,229
Crook	1,909	79.01%	413	17.09%	70	2.90%	24	0.99%	1,496	61.92%	2,416
Fremont	9,077	67.72%	3,307	24.67%	731	5.45%	288	2.15%	5,770	43.05%	13,403
Goshen	3,572	67.21%	1,373	25.83%	269	5.06%	101	1.90%	2,199	41.38%	5,315
Hot Springs	1,602	62.70%	745	29.16%	136	5.32%	72	2.82%	857	33.54%	2,555
Johnson	2,291	72.78%	635	20.17%	139	4.42%	83	2.64%	1,656	52.61%	3,148
Laramie	15,361	55.43%	9,512	34.32%	2,225	8.03%	615	2.22%	5,849	21.11%	27,713
Lincoln	3,412	72.69%	1,063	22.65%	120	2.56%	99	2.11%	2,349	50.04%	4,694
Natrona	16,801	62.99%	7,111	26.66%	1,768	6.63%	992	3.72%	9,690	36.33%	26,672
Niobrara	1,075	76.13%	270	19.12%	38	2.69%	29	2.05%	805	57.01%	1,412
Park	6,435	73.03%	1,718	19.50%	496	5.63%	162	1.84%	4,717	53.53%	8,811
Platte	2,642	57.21%	1,555	33.67%	262	5.67%	159	3.44%	1,087	23.54%	4,618
Sheridan	5,649	58.56%	3,034	31.45%	641	6.65%	322	3.34%	2,615	27.11%	9,646
Sublette	1,538	73.87%	357	17.15%	139	6.68%	48	2.31%	1,181	56.72%	2,082
Sweetwater	6,265	51.92%	4,728	39.18%	826	6.85%	248	2.06%	1,537	12.74%	12,067
Teton	3,004	57.64%	1,361	26.11%	664	12.74%	183	3.51%	1,643	31.53%	5,212
Uinta	2,738	65.96%	1,138	27.42%	189	4.55%	86	2.07%	1,600	38.54%	4,151
Washakie	2,634	67.59%	945	24.25%	230	5.90%	88	2.26%	1,689	43.34%	3,897
Weston	2,219	74.71%	584	19.66%	122	4.11%	45	1.52%	1,635	55.05%	2,970
Totals	110,700	62.64%	49,427	27.97%	12,072	6.83%	4,514	2.55%	61,273	34.67%	176,713

==== Counties that flipped from Democratic to Republican ====
- Sweetwater

== See also ==
- United States presidential elections in Wyoming
- Presidency of Ronald Reagan
