= 2016 United States presidential election in Wyoming =

- November 8, 2016
- Turnout: 57.9% ▲

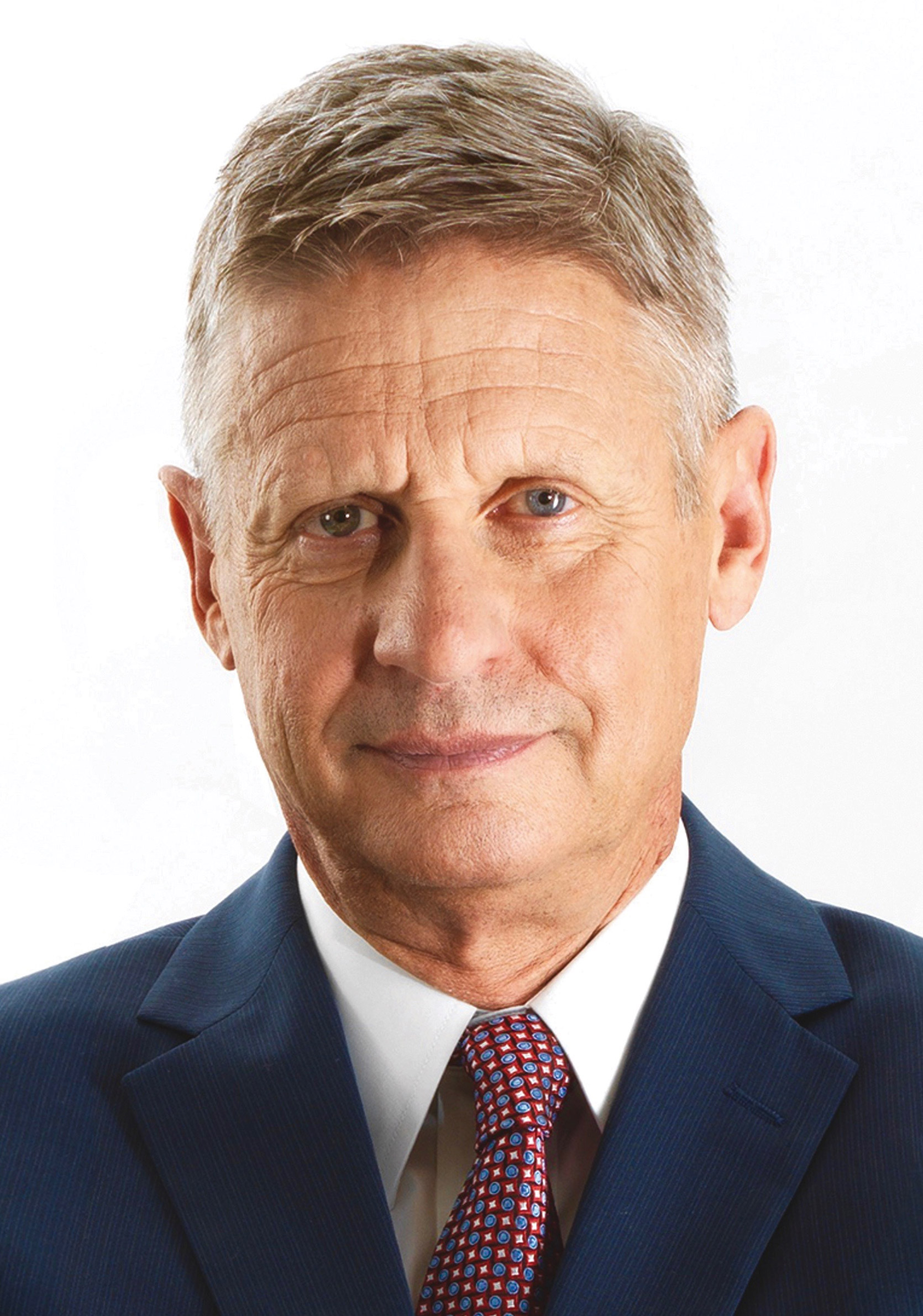
Nominee	Donald Trump	Hillary Clinton	Gary Johnson
Party	Republican	Democratic	Libertarian
Home state	New York	New York	New Mexico
Running mate	Mike Pence	Tim Kaine	Bill Weld
Electoral vote	3	0	0
Popular vote	174,419	55,973	13,287
Percentage	68.17%	21.88%	5.19%

Trump
40–50%
50–60%
60–70%
70–80%
80–90%
90–100%
Clinton
40–50%
50–60%
60–70%
70–80%
No data
President before election
Barack Obama
Democratic
Elected President
Donald Trump
Republican

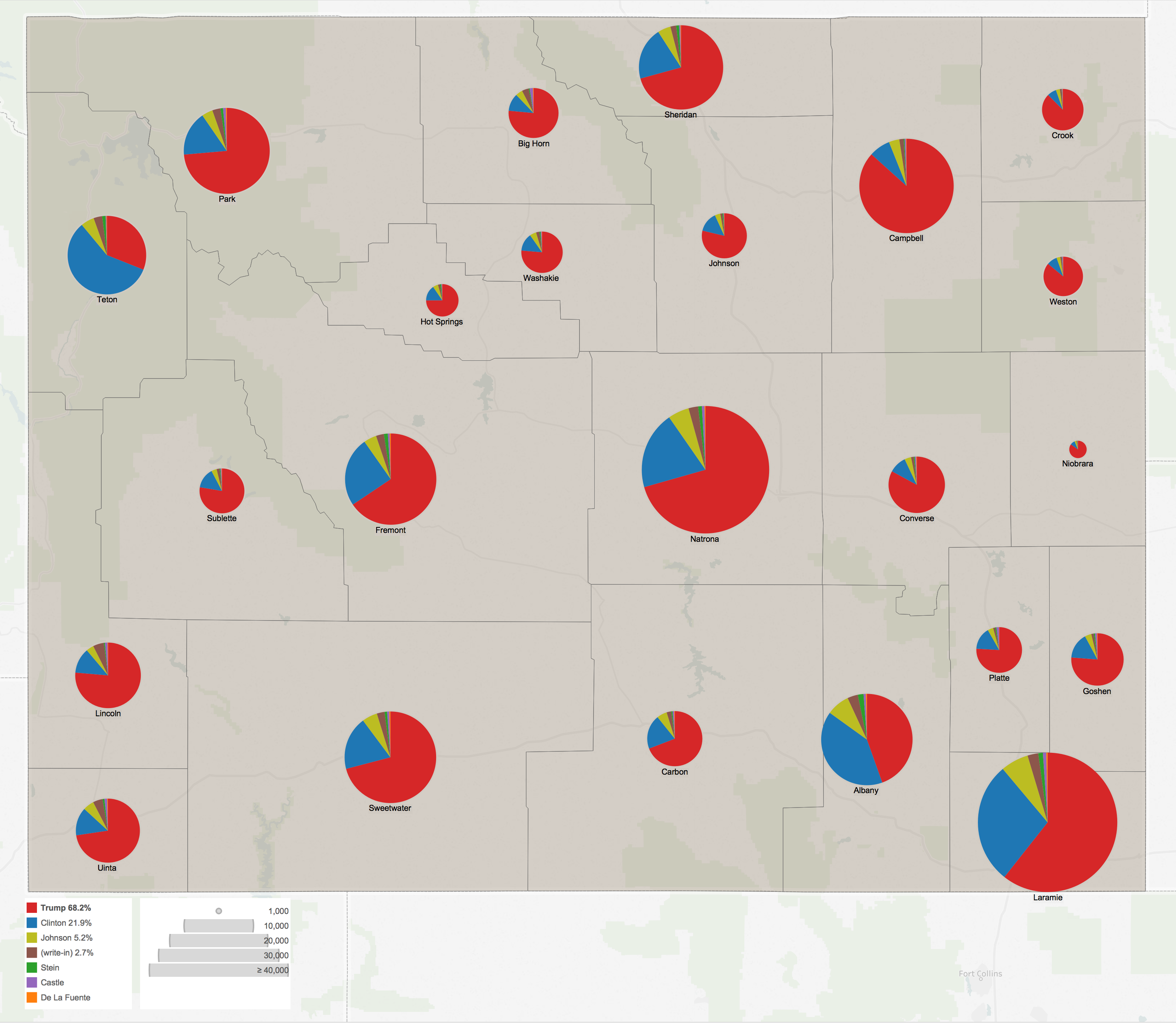
Results by county showing number of votes by size and candidates by color

Treemap of the popular vote by county

The 2016 United States presidential election in Wyoming was held on November 8, 2016, as part of the 2016 United States presidential election in which all 50 states plus the District of Columbia participated. Wyoming voters chose electors to represent them in the Electoral College via a popular vote pitting the Republican Party's nominee, businessman Donald Trump, and running mate Indiana Governor Mike Pence against Democratic Party nominee, former Secretary of State Hillary Clinton and her running mate, Virginia Senator Tim Kaine.

On March 1 and April 9, 2016, in the presidential primaries, Wyoming voters expressed their preferences for the Democratic, Republican, Libertarian, and Constitution parties' respective nominees for president. Registered members of each party only voted in their party's primary, while voters who were unaffiliated chose any one primary in which to vote. Prior to the election, Wyoming was considered to be a state Trump would win or a safe red state.

Donald Trump won the election in Wyoming with 67.4% of the vote. Hillary Clinton received 21.6% of the vote. Gary Johnson of the Libertarian Party received 5.1%. Wyoming, a solidly Republican state, has not voted for a Democrat in a presidential election since it went for Lyndon B. Johnson in 1964. Trump carried every county with the exception of Teton County, the most highly-educated county in the state.

Trump's 46.3-point margin over Clinton not only made Wyoming the most Republican state in the 2016 election, but also the largest margin of victory by any presidential candidate in the state's history, besting Ronald Reagan's 42.3-point margin in 1984. Clinton's 21.88% vote share was the lowest of any major party presidential nominee since 1924.

== Primary elections ==
=== Republican caucuses ===
Republican primary results by county. Donald Trump Ted Cruz Marco Rubio Uncommitted

Wyoming Republican county conventions, March 12, 2016
Candidate	Votes	Percentage	Actual delegate count		
Candidate	Votes	Percentage	Bound	Unbound	Total
Ted Cruz	1,128	70.94%	9	0	9
Marco Rubio	231	14.53%	1	0	1
Donald Trump	112	7.04%	1	0	1
John Kasich	42	2.64%	0	0	0
Others	2	0.13%	0	0	0
Undeclared	75	4.72%	1	0	1
Unprojected delegates:			0	0	0
Total:	1,590	100%	12	0	12
Source: The Green Papers and Wyoming Republican Party

Wyoming Republican state convention, April 14-16, 2016
Candidate	Votes	Percentage	Actual delegate count		
Candidate	Votes	Percentage	Bound	Unbound	Total
Ted Cruz			14	1	15
(available)			0	2	2
Unprojected delegates:			0	0	0
Total:			14	3	17
Source: The Green Papers and Wyoming Republican Party

=== Democratic caucuses ===
Wyoming Democratic caucuses, April 9, 2016
Candidate	County delegates		Estimated national delegates		
Candidate	Count	Percentage	Pledged	Unpledged	Total
Bernie Sanders	156	55.7%	7	0	7
Hillary Clinton	124	44.3%	7	4	11
Uncommitted	—N/a		–	–	–
Total		100%	14	4	18

== General election ==
=== Voting history ===
Wyoming is the least populous of all 50 U.S. states. With almost 60% of the population identifying with or leaning towards the Republican Party, compared to less than 30% identifying with or leaning towards the Democrats, it is also the most solid Republican state, ahead of Idaho and Utah. In the 2012 presidential election, incumbent President Barack Obama received less than 28% of the votes, trailing Mitt Romney by more than 40 points.

=== Predictions ===
Source	Ranking	As of
Los Angeles Times	Safe R	November 6, 2016
CNN	Safe R	November 4, 2016
Cook Political Report	Safe R	November 7, 2016
Electoral-vote.com	Safe R	November 8, 2016
Rothenberg Political Report	Safe R	November 7, 2016
Sabato's Crystal Ball	Safe R	November 7, 2016
RealClearPolitics	Safe R	November 8, 2016
Fox News	Safe R	November 7, 2016

=== Results ===
Chart of popular vote
1. Trump (68.2%)
2. Clinton (21.9%)
3. Johnson (5.19%)
4. Write-ins (2.70%)
5. Stein (0.98%)
6. Others (1.08%)

2016 United States presidential election in Wyoming
Party	Candidate	Running mate	Votes	Percentage	Electoral votes
Republican	Donald Trump	Mike Pence	174,419	68.17%	3
Democratic	Hillary Clinton	Tim Kaine	55,973	21.88%	0
Libertarian	Gary Johnson	William Weld	13,287	5.19%	0
Write-in	Various candidates	Various candidates	6,904	2.70%	0
Green	Jill Stein	Ajamu Baraka	2,515	0.98%	0
Constitution	Darrell Castle	Scott Bradley	2,042	0.80%	0
Reform/ADP	Rocky De La Fuente	Micheal Steinberg	709	0.28%	0
Totals			255,849	100.00%	3

==== By county ====
County	Donald Trump Republican		Hillary Clinton Democratic		Various candidates Other parties		Margin		Total votes cast
County	#	%	#	%	#	%	#	%	Total votes cast
Albany	7,602	44.56%	6,890	40.39%	2,568	15.05%	712	4.17%	17,060
Big Horn	4,067	76.49%	604	11.36%	646	12.15%	3,463	65.13%	5,317
Campbell	15,778	86.70%	1,324	7.28%	1,097	6.03%	14,454	79.42%	18,199
Carbon	4,409	69.17%	1,279	20.07%	686	10.76%	3,130	49.10%	6,374
Converse	5,520	82.96%	668	10.04%	466	7.00%	4,852	72.92%	6,654
Crook	3,348	87.51%	273	7.14%	205	5.36%	3,075	80.37%	3,826
Fremont	11,167	65.60%	4,200	24.67%	1,656	9.73%	6,967	40.93%	17,023
Goshen	4,418	76.22%	924	15.94%	454	7.83%	3,494	60.28%	5,796
Hot Springs	1,939	74.98%	400	15.47%	247	9.55%	1,539	59.51%	2,586
Johnson	3,477	78.72%	638	14.44%	302	6.84%	2,839	64.28%	4,417
Laramie	24,847	60.65%	11,573	28.25%	4,549	11.10%	13,274	32.40%	40,969
Lincoln	6,779	76.38%	1,105	12.45%	991	11.17%	5,674	63.93%	8,875
Natrona	23,552	70.62%	6,577	19.72%	3,219	9.65%	16,975	50.90%	33,348
Niobrara	1,116	84.93%	115	8.75%	83	6.32%	1,001	76.18%	1,314
Park	11,115	73.63%	2,535	16.79%	1,445	9.57%	8,580	56.84%	15,095
Platte	3,437	75.89%	719	15.88%	373	8.24%	2,718	60.01%	4,529
Sheridan	10,266	70.75%	2,927	20.17%	1,317	9.08%	7,339	50.58%	14,510
Sublette	3,409	77.65%	644	14.67%	337	7.68%	2,765	62.98%	4,390
Sweetwater	12,154	70.95%	3,231	18.86%	1,745	10.19%	8,923	52.09%	17,130
Teton	3,921	31.05%	7,314	57.92%	1,392	11.02%	-3,393	-26.87%	12,627
Uinta	6,154	72.66%	1,202	14.19%	1,114	13.15%	4,952	58.47%	8,470
Washakie	2,911	76.32%	532	13.95%	371	9.73%	2,379	62.37%	3,814
Weston	3,033	86.02%	299	8.48%	194	5.50%	2,734	77.54%	3,526
Total	174,419	68.17%	55,973	21.88%	25,457	9.95%	118,446	46.29%	255,849

==== By congressional district ====
Wyoming had only one congressional district, the at-large congressional district, which covered the entire state. The results in this district were equivalent to the statewide election results.

District	Trump	Clinton	Representative
At-large	68.17%	21.88%	Liz Cheney

== See also ==
- United States presidential elections in Wyoming
- First presidency of Donald Trump
