= 2008 United States presidential election in Wyoming =

- November 4, 2008

Nominee	John McCain	Barack Obama
Party	Republican	Democratic
Home state	Arizona	Illinois
Running mate	Sarah Palin	Joe Biden
Electoral vote	3	0
Popular vote	164,958	82,868
Percentage	64.78%	32.54%

McCain
50–60%
60–70%
70–80%
80–90%
90–100%
Obama
50–60%
60–70%
70–80%
Tie/No Data
President before election
George W. Bush
Republican
Elected President
Barack Obama
Democratic

The 2008 United States presidential election in Wyoming took place on November 4, 2008, and was part of the 2008 United States presidential election. Voters chose three representatives, or electors to the Electoral College, who voted for president and vice president.

Wyoming was won by Republican nominee John McCain by a 32.2% margin of victory. Prior to the election, all 17 news organizations considered this a state McCain would win, or otherwise considered as a safe red state. Polling in the state gave a hefty and large lead to Republican John McCain over Democrat Barack Obama. Despite the landslide re-election victory of Democratic governor Dave Freudenthal two years prior, Wyoming remained a heavily Republican state at the presidential level, and neither of the major party candidates campaigned in the state.

Despite McCain's landslide victory, Obama did do significantly better than John Kerry in 2004 and even won one more county than Kerry. This is the most recent election in which the Democratic candidate received more than 30% of the vote in Wyoming, and the last in which the Republican nominee received fewer than double the votes of the Democratic nominee. Obama's 82,868 vote total remains the most received by a Democratic presidential candidate in the state's history. Obama became the first Democrat since Grover Cleveland in 1892 to win the White House without carrying Sweetwater County.

== Caucuses ==
- 2008 Wyoming Democratic presidential caucuses
- 2008 Wyoming Republican presidential caucuses

== Campaign ==
=== Predictions ===
There were 16 news organizations who made state-by-state predictions of the election. Here are their last predictions before election day:

Source	Ranking
D.C. Political Report	Likely R
Cook Political Report	Solid R
The Takeaway	Solid R
Electoral-vote.com	Solid R
Washington Post	Solid R
Politico	Solid R
RealClearPolitics	Solid R
FiveThirtyEight	Solid R
CQ Politics	Solid R
The New York Times	Solid R
CNN	Safe R
NPR	Solid R
MSNBC	Solid R
Fox News	Likely R
Associated Press	Likely R
Rasmussen Reports	Safe R

=== Polling ===
McCain won every single pre-election poll, and each by a double-digit margin of victory. The final 3 polls average McCain leading with 58% to 35%.

=== Fundraising ===
John McCain raised a total of $447,757 in the state. Barack Obama raised $723,033.

=== Advertising and visits ===
Because Wyoming is a strong red state, not much advertising went into the state. Obama didn't spend anything while the Republican National Committee spent $2,518. Neither campaign visited the state.

== Analysis ==
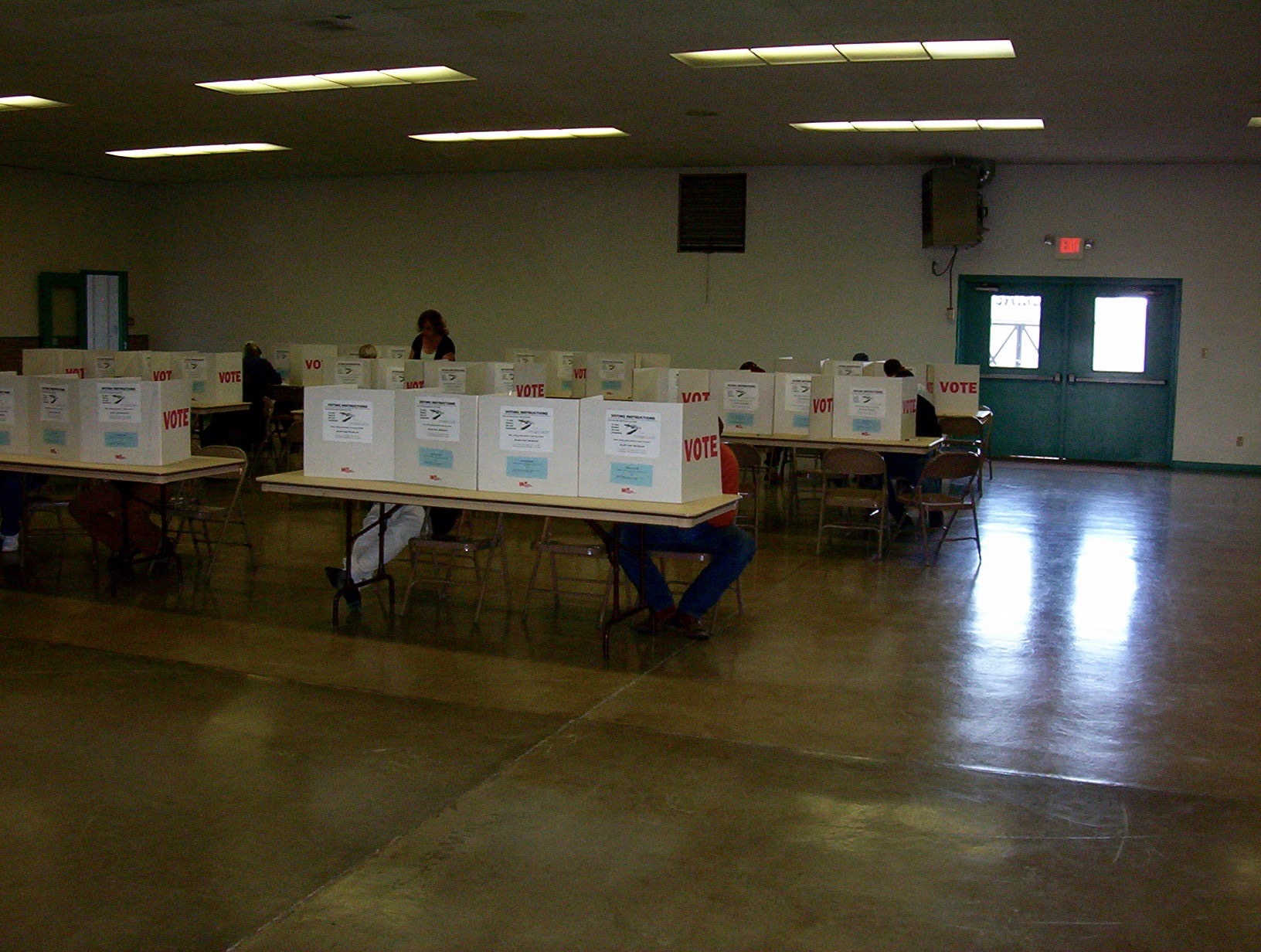
Voting taking place in a Laramie, Wyoming polling station

Located in the Inner Mountain West, Wyoming was home to then-incumbent Vice President Dick Cheney. It is one of the most reliably Republican states in the nation—and by some measures, the most Republican. Its demographics are a perfect fit for the Republican Party. It is the least populated state in the nation (even less than the District of Columbia), has no major metropolitan areas, and is heavily rural and White/Caucasian. Voters in the state tend to be very conservative on both social and fiscal issues. At the time of this election, however, it did still have a Democratic governor. No Democratic presidential nominee has won Wyoming since Lyndon B. Johnson in his landslide election in 1964—one of only eight times the state has voted Democrat in a presidential election.

Republicans have several structural advantages in the state. Large chunks of Wyoming are located in out-of-state television markets—most notably Denver, Billings, Salt Lake City and Idaho Falls. This forces statewide candidates to advertise in areas where most of their audience can't vote for them. Additionally, 60 percent of the state's registered voters are Republicans while only 25 percent are Democrats—one of the largest discrepancies in the nation.

The 2008 election was no different. The state was called for McCain as soon as the polls closed, and gave McCain his second largest margin of victory in 2008. McCain carried Laramie County, the most populous county that contains the state capital and largest city of Cheyenne, with 58.98 percent of the vote as well as every other county throughout the state often by more than two-to-one margins but two. Obama greatly improved upon Kerry's performance in Teton County, the most affluent county in Wyoming that includes the Jackson Hole prime ski resort and tourism attractions such as Yellowstone National Park and Grand Teton National Park, carrying the county with 60.67% of the vote. Obama also won Albany County, due in large part to the presence of the University of Wyoming at Laramie and the tremendous excitement that his campaign fueled among younger voters and college students. The county would return to its Republican roots in 2012 and 2016, but flipped to Obama's former running mate Joe Biden in 2020, the only county to do so.

With 64.78% of the popular vote, Wyoming would prove to be McCain's second strongest state in the 2008 election after Oklahoma.

During the same election, incumbent Republican U.S. Senator Mike Enzi was reelected in a landslide victory over Democrat Chris Rothfuss, a professor of political science at the University of Wyoming. Enzi received 75.63% of the vote while Rothfuss took in 24.26%. For the state's other U.S. Senate seat's special election, incumbent Republican John Barrasso was also elected in a landslide with 73.35% of the vote over Democratic attorney Nick Carter of Gillette who received 26.53%. The state's sole seat in the United States House of Representatives was also up for grabs, with incumbent Republican U.S. Representative Barbara Cubin retiring. Former State Treasurer Cynthia Lummis, a Republican, defeated Democrat Gary Trauner and Libertarian W. David Herbert for the at-large seat. Lummis received 52.62% of the vote to Trauner's 42.81% and Herbert's 4.42%. Democrats did have success at the state level, however, as they picked up two seats in the Wyoming House of Representatives.

== Results ==
2008 United States presidential election in Wyoming
Party	Candidate	Running mate	Votes	Percentage	Electoral votes
Republican	John McCain	Sarah Palin	164,958	64.78%	3
Democratic	Barack Obama	Joe Biden	82,868	32.54%	0
Independent	Ralph Nader	Matt Gonzalez	2,525	0.99%	0
Libertarian	Bob Barr	Wayne Allyn Root	1,594	0.63%	0
Write-ins	Write-ins		1,521	0.60%	0
Constitution	Chuck Baldwin	Darrell Castle	1,192	0.47%	0
Totals			254,658	100.00%	3
Voter turnout (Voting age population)					64.1%

=== By county ===
County	John McCain Republican		Barack Obama Democratic		Various candidates Other parties		Margin		Total votes cast
County	#	%	#	%	#	%	#	%	Total votes cast
Albany	7,936	46.36%	8,644	50.50%	537	3.14%	-708	-4.14%	17,117
Big Horn	4,045	76.18%	1,108	20.87%	157	2.96%	2,937	55.31%	5,310
Campbell	13,011	79.72%	2,990	18.32%	319	1.95%	10,021	61.40%	16,320
Carbon	4,331	63.19%	2,336	34.08%	187	2.73%	1,995	29.11%	6,854
Converse	4,922	76.30%	1,380	21.39%	149	2.31%	3,542	54.91%	6,451
Crook	2,967	80.56%	612	16.62%	104	2.82%	2,355	63.94%	3,683
Fremont	11,083	63.00%	6,016	34.20%	493	2.80%	5,067	28.80%	17,592
Goshen	3,942	66.68%	1,832	30.99%	138	2.33%	2,110	35.69%	5,912
Hot Springs	1,834	72.03%	619	24.31%	93	3.65%	1,215	47.72%	2,546
Johnson	3,334	76.57%	908	20.85%	112	2.57%	2,426	55.72%	4,354
Laramie	24,549	58.98%	16,072	38.61%	1,004	2.41%	8,477	20.37%	41,625
Lincoln	6,485	75.69%	1,823	21.28%	260	3.03%	4,662	54.41%	8,568
Natrona	21,906	65.85%	10,475	31.49%	886	2.66%	11,431	34.36%	33,267
Niobrara	1,017	78.65%	244	18.87%	32	2.47%	773	59.78%	1,293
Park	10,839	72.33%	3,757	25.07%	389	2.60%	7,082	47.26%	14,985
Platte	3,002	65.83%	1,407	30.86%	151	3.31%	1,595	34.97%	4,560
Sheridan	10,177	67.93%	4,458	29.76%	346	2.31%	5,719	38.17%	14,981
Sublette	3,316	76.12%	936	21.49%	104	2.39%	2,380	54.63%	4,356
Sweetwater	10,360	62.02%	5,762	34.50%	581	3.48%	4,598	27.52%	16,703
Teton	4,565	37.07%	7,472	60.67%	279	2.27%	-2,907	-23.60%	12,316
Uinta	5,763	68.75%	2,317	27.64%	303	3.61%	3,446	41.11%	8,383
Washakie	2,956	72.29%	1,042	25.48%	91	2.23%	1,914	46.81%	4,089
Weston	2,618	77.16%	658	19.39%	117	3.45%	1,960	57.77%	3,393
Total	164,958	64.78%	82,868	32.54%	6,832	2.68%	82,090	32.24%	254,658

Counties that flipped from Republican to Democratic

- Albany (largest municipality: Laramie)

=== By congressional district ===
Due to the state's low population, only one congressional district is allocated. This district is called the at-large district, because it covers the entire state, and thus is equivalent to the statewide election results.

District	McCain	Obama	Representative
At-large	64.78%	32.54%	Cynthia Lummis

== Electors ==
Technically the voters of Wyoming cast their ballots for electors: representatives to the Electoral College. Wyoming is allocated 3 electors because it has 1 congressional districts and 2 senators. All candidates who appear on the ballot or qualify to receive write-in votes must submit a list of 3 electors, who pledge to vote for their candidate and their running mate. Whoever wins the majority of votes in the state is awarded all 3 electoral votes. Their chosen electors then vote for president and vice president. Although electors are pledged to their candidate and running mate, they are not obligated to vote for them. An elector who votes for someone other than their candidate is known as a faithless elector.

The electors of each state and the District of Columbia met on December 15, 2008, to cast their votes for president and vice president. The Electoral College itself never meets as one body. Instead the electors from each state and the District of Columbia met in their respective capitols.

The following were the members of the Electoral College from the state. All 3 were pledged to John McCain and Sarah Palin:

1. Rosa Goolsby
2. Ron Micheli
3. Susan Thomas

== See also ==
- United States presidential elections in Wyoming
- Presidency of Barack Obama
