= United States presidential elections in Wyoming =

Presidential elections in Wyoming
- Number of elections: 34
- Voted Democratic: 8
- Voted Republican: 26
- Voted other: 0
- Voted for winning candidate: 24
- Voted for losing candidate: 10

Since becoming a state on July 10, 1890, Wyoming has been involved in 34 presidential elections in the United States, consistently holding 3 electoral votes. Wyoming granted women the right to vote in 1869, prior to joining the Union, and was the first place in America to do so. This was a significant milestone for women's suffrage and paved the way for other states to follow suit. As a state with a strong Republican tradition, Wyoming tends to favor the Republican Party in presidential elections. It has consistently voted for Republican candidates in recent decades and is considered a reliably red state. When Wyoming participated in its first presidential election in 1892, Republican candidate Benjamin Harrison won the state with 50.52% of the vote. Harrison's Democratic opponent, Grover Cleveland, who went on to win the election, did not even appear on the ballot in Wyoming.

Since the 1892 presidential election, the Democratic Party has rarely carried Wyoming in presidential elections. The Democrats' best showing in the state was in the 1936 presidential election, when President Franklin Roosevelt won a decisive victory nationwide. The last time the Democratic Party won Wyoming in a presidential election was in 1964, when Lyndon B. Johnson won a landslide victory across the country.

While much of Wyoming is a stronghold for the Republican Party, Teton County is an exception. In presidential elections since 1988, the county has only supported a Republican candidate once, in 2000, and is considered to be the most Democratic-leaning county in the state.

== Presidential elections ==
Key for parties
American Independent Party – (AI)
Democratic Party – (D)
Farmer-Labor Party – (FL)
Green Party – (G)
Independent candidate – (I)
Libertarian Party – (LI)
People's Party – (PO)
Progressive Party (1912) – (PR-1912)
Progressive Party (1924) – (PR-1924)
Progressive Party (1948) – (PR-1948)
Prohibition Party – (PRO)
Reform Party – (RE)
Republican Party – (R)
Socialist Party – (S)
Social Democratic Party – (SD)
Union Party – (U)
Note – A double dagger (‡) indicates the national winner.

Presidential elections in Utah from 1896 to present
Year	Winner			Runner-up			Third-place candidate			EV	Refs.
Year	Candidate	Votes	%	Candidate	Votes	%	Candidate	Votes	%	EV	Refs.
1892	Benjamin Harrison (R)	8,454	50.52%	James B. Weaver (PO)	7,722	46.14%	John Bidwell (PRO)	530	3.17%	3	(Note: National winner Grover Cleveland was not on the ballot.)
1896	William Jennings Bryan (D)	10,861	51.49%	William McKinley (R) ‡	10,072	47.75%	Joshua Levering (PRO)	159	0.75%	3	
1900	William McKinley (R) ‡	14,482	58.66%	William Jennings Bryan (D)	10,164	41.17%	Eugene V. Debs (SD)	21	0.09%	3	
1904	Theodore Roosevelt (R) ‡	20,489	66.93%	Alton B. Parker (D)	8,930	29.17%	Eugene V. Debs (S)	987	3.22%	3	
1908	William Howard Taft (R) ‡	20,846	55.43%	William Jennings Bryan (D)	14,918	39.67%	Eugene V. Debs (S)	1,715	4.56%	3	
1912	Woodrow Wilson (D) ‡	15,310	36.2%	William Howard Taft (R)	14,560	34.42%	Theodore Roosevelt (PR-1912)	9,232	21.83%	3	(Note: The American Socialist Party's candidate Eugene Debs received 2,760 votes (6.53%).)
1916	Woodrow Wilson (D) ‡	28,316	54.62%	Charles Evans Hughes (R)	21,698	41.86%	Allan Benson (S)	1,453	2.8%	3	
1920	Warren G. Harding (R) ‡	35,091	64.15%	James M. Cox (D)	17,429	31.86%	Parley P. Christensen (FL)	2,180	3.99%	3	
1924	Calvin Coolidge (R) ‡	41,858	52.39%	Robert M. La Follette (PR-1924)	25,174	31.51%	John W. Davis (D)	12,868	16.11%	3	
1928	Herbert Hoover (R) ‡	52,748	63.68%	Al Smith (D)	29,299	35.37%	Norman Thomas (S)	788	0.95%	3	
1932	Franklin D. Roosevelt (D) ‡	54,370	56.07%	Herbert Hoover (R)	39,583	40.82%	Norman Thomas (S)	2,829	2.92%	3	
1936	Franklin D. Roosevelt (D) ‡	62,624	64.59%	Alf Landon (R)	38,739	39.95%	William Lemke (U)	1,653	1.7%	3	
1940	Franklin D. Roosevelt (D) ‡	59,287	52.82%	Wendell Willkie (R)	52,633	46.89%	Roger W. Babson (U)	172	0.15%	3	
1944	Thomas E. Dewey (R)	51,921	51.23%	Franklin D. Roosevelt (D) ‡	49,419	48.77%	–	–	–	3	
1948	Harry S. Truman (D) ‡	52,354	51.62%	Thomas E. Dewey (R)	47,947	47.27%	Henry A. Wallace (PR-1948)	931	0.92%	3	
1952	Dwight D. Eisenhower (R) ‡	81,049	62.71%	Adlai Stevenson II (D)	47,934	37.09%	Stuart Hamblen (PRO)	194	0.15%	3	
1956	Dwight D. Eisenhower (R) ‡	74,573	60.08%	Adlai Stevenson II (D)	49,554	39.92%	–	–	–	3	
1960	Richard Nixon (R)	77,451	55.01%	John F. Kennedy (D) ‡	63,331	44.99%	–	–	–	3	
1964	Lyndon B. Johnson (D) ‡	80,718	56.56%	Barry Goldwater (R)	61,998	43.44%	–	–	–	3	
1968	Richard Nixon (R) ‡	70,927	55.76%	Hubert Humphrey (D)	45,173	35.51%	George Wallace (AI)	11,105	8.73%	3	
1972	Richard Nixon (R) ‡	100,464	69.01%	George McGovern (D)	44,358	30.47%	John G. Schmitz (Write-in)	748	0.51%	3	
1976	Gerald Ford (R)	92,717	59.3%	Jimmy Carter (D) ‡	62,239	39.81%	Eugene McCarthy (Write-in)	624	0.4%	3	
1980	Ronald Reagan (R) ‡	110,700	62.64%	Jimmy Carter (D)	49,427	27.97%	John B. Anderson (I)	12,072	6.83%	3	
1984	Ronald Reagan (R) ‡	133,241	70.51%	Walter Mondale (D)	53,370	28.24%	David Bergland (LI)	2,357	1.25%	3	
1988	George H. W. Bush (R) ‡	106,867	60.53%	Michael Dukakis (D)	67,113	38.01%	Ron Paul (LI)	2,026	1.15%	3	
1992	George H. W. Bush (R)	79,347	39.7%	Bill Clinton (D) ‡	68,160	34.1%	Ross Perot (I)	51,263	25.65%	3	
1996	Bob Dole (R)	105,388	49.7%	Bill Clinton (D) ‡	77,934	36.75%	Ross Perot (RE)	25,928	12.23%	3	
2000	George W. Bush (Note: Wyoming was the home state of vice presidential candidate Dick Cheney.) (R) ‡	147,947	67.76%	Al Gore (D)	60,481	27.7%	Ralph Nader (G)	4,625	2.12%	3	
2004	George W. Bush (R) ‡	167,629	68.86%	John Kerry (D)	70,776	29.07%	Ralph Nader (RE)	2,741	1.13%	3	
2008	John McCain (R)	164,958	64.78%	Barack Obama (D) ‡	82,868	32.54%	Ralph Nader (I)	2,525	0.99%	3	
2012	Mitt Romney (R)	170,962	68.64%	Barack Obama (D) ‡	69,286	27.82%	Gary Johnson (LI)	5,326	2.14%	3	
2016	Donald Trump (R) ‡	174,419	68.17%	Hillary Clinton (D)	55,973	21.88%	Gary Johnson (LI)	13,287	5.19%	3	
2020	Donald Trump (R)	193,559	69.94%	Joe Biden (D) ‡	73,491	26.55%	Jo Jorgensen (LI)	5,768	2.08%	3	
2024	Donald Trump (R) ‡	192,633	71.6%	Kamala Harris (D)	69,527	25.84%	Chase Oliver (LI)	4,193	1.56%	3	

== Works cited ==
- Guide to U.S. Elections. SAGE Publications. 2010. ISBN 978-1-60426-536-1. LCCN 2009033938. OL 24461757M.
- Burnham, Walter Dean (1955). Presidential ballots, 1836–1892. Johns Hopkins University Press. LCCN 55008428. OL 6176796M.
- Presidential elections, 1789–1996. Congressional Quarterly. 1997. ISBN 978-1-56802-065-5. LCCN 97019084. OL 673017M.
