= 1920 United States presidential election in Wyoming =

- November 2, 1920
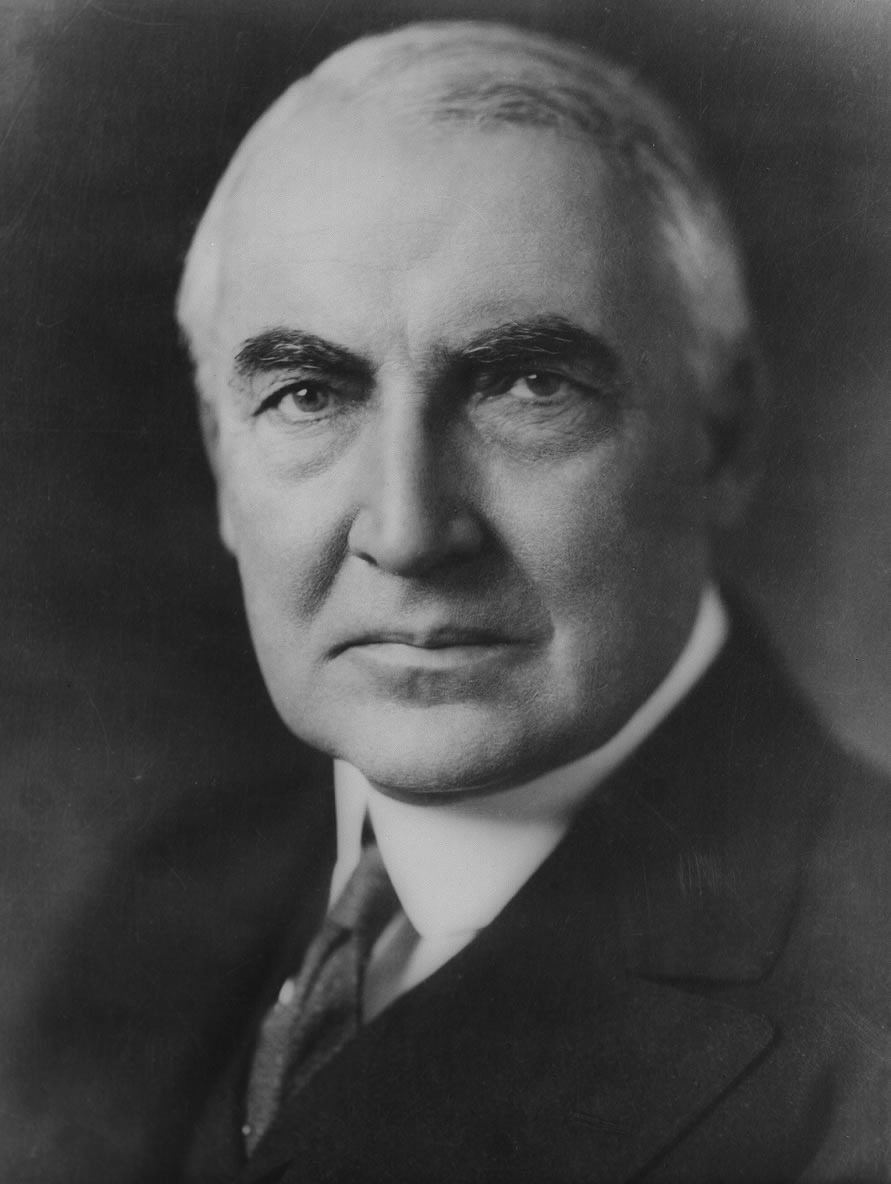

Nominee	Warren G. Harding	James M. Cox
Party	Republican	Democratic
Home state	Ohio	Ohio
Running mate	Calvin Coolidge	Franklin D. Roosevelt
Electoral vote	3	0
Popular vote	35,091	17,429
Percentage	64.15%	31.86%
County results
Harding
50–60%
60–70%
70–80%
President before election
Woodrow Wilson
Democratic
Elected President
Warren G. Harding
Republican

The 1920 United States presidential election in Wyoming took place on November 2, 1920, as part of the 1920 United States presidential election. State voters chose three representatives, or electors, to the Electoral College, who voted for president and vice president.

Wyoming was won by Republican Ohio Senator Warren G. Harding, running with governor of Massachusetts and the future 30th president of the United States Calvin Coolidge, with 64.15 percent of the popular vote, against the Democratic 46th and 48th Governor of Ohio James M. Cox, running with the future Governor of New York and 32nd President of the United States Franklin D. Roosevelt, with 31.86 percent of the popular vote.

Like all of the Western United States, severe anger at President Woodrow Wilson's failure to maintain his promise to keep the United States out of World War I produced extreme hostility among the strongly isolationist population of remote Wyoming. In addition, by the beginning of 1920 skyrocketing inflation and Wilson's focus upon his proposed League of Nations at the expense of domestic policy had helped make the incumbent president very unpopular – besides which Wilson also had major health problems that had left First Lady Edith effectively running the nation. Political unrest seen in the Palmer Raids and the "Red Scare" further added to the unpopularity of the Democratic Party, since this global political turmoil produced considerable fear of alien revolutionaries invading the country. Demand in the West for exclusion of Asian immigrants became even stronger than it had been before. Another factor hurting the Democratic Party was the migration of many people from the traditionally Republican Upper Midwest into the state.

Because the West had been the chief presidential battleground ever since the "System of 1896" emerged following that election, Governor Cox traveled across the western states in August and September, but he did not visit Wyoming with its tiny population and poverty of electoral votes. No polls were taken in the state, but a Republican success was universally assumed.

Like every Mountain state, Wyoming, which had voted strongly for Woodrow Wilson in 1916 – turned very strongly against Cox, who was to lose the state by a two-to-one majority, after Charles Evans Hughes had lost the state by double digits in 1916. Harding carried every county in Wyoming with an absolute majority, and passed sixty percent in all but three. Socialist Eugene Debs was not on the ballot in Wyoming, but Labor candidate Parley Christensen managed double figures in Sheridan County. This would prove the last time Sweetwater County voted Republican until Richard Nixon's landslide 1972 victory.

== Results ==
General Election Results
Party	Pledged to	Elector	Votes
Republican Party	Warren G. Harding	Peter Kooi	35,091
Republican Party	Warren G. Harding	James Mickelson	34,678
Republican Party	Warren G. Harding	J. M. Schwoob	34,590
Democratic Party	James M. Cox	Mable H. Crouter	17,429
Democratic Party	James M. Cox	D. P. B. Marshall	17,331
Democratic Party	James M. Cox	William B. Ross	17,130
Labor Party	Parley P. Christensen	Martin Cahill	2,180
Labor Party	Parley P. Christensen	J. H. Giroux	2,132
Labor Party	Parley P. Christensen	Thomas G. Freshney	2,109
Votes cast (Note: Based on totals for highest elector on each ticket)			54,700

=== Results by county ===
County	Warren G. Harding Republican		James M. Cox Democratic		Parley P. Christensen Labor		Margin		Total votes cast (Note: Based on highest elector on each ticket)
County	#	%	#	%	#	%	#	%	Total votes cast
Albany	1,769	59.16%	1,145	38.29%	76	2.54%	624	20.87%	2,990
Big Horn	2,157	65.80%	1,082	33.01%	39	1.19%	1,075	32.79%	3,278
Campbell	1,027	66.69%	493	32.01%	20	1.30%	534	34.68%	1,540
Carbon	1,871	60.65%	1,039	33.68%	175	5.67%	832	26.97%	3,085
Converse	1,561	69.41%	679	30.19%	9	0.40%	882	39.22%	2,249
Crook	934	67.24%	451	32.47%	4	0.29%	483	34.77%	1,389
Fremont	2,194	67.61%	994	30.63%	57	1.76%	1,200	36.98%	3,245
Goshen	1,496	72.73%	552	26.84%	9	0.44%	944	45.89%	2,057
Hot Springs	1,212	64.61%	529	28.20%	135	7.20%	683	36.41%	1,876
Johnson	1,202	69.36%	525	30.29%	6	0.35%	677	39.07%	1,733
Laramie	3,399	62.60%	1,810	33.33%	221	4.07%	1,589	29.26%	5,430
Lincoln	2,043	61.06%	1,154	34.49%	149	4.45%	889	26.57%	3,346
Natrona	2,957	66.20%	1,153	25.81%	357	7.99%	1,804	40.39%	4,467
Niobrara	969	73.52%	345	26.18%	4	0.30%	624	47.34%	1,318
Park	1,630	70.53%	666	28.82%	15	0.65%	964	41.71%	2,311
Platte	1,405	65.68%	694	32.45%	40	1.87%	711	33.24%	2,139
Sheridan	2,645	60.43%	1,192	27.23%	540	12.34%	1,453	33.20%	4,377
Sweetwater	1,744	54.14%	1,216	37.75%	261	8.10%	528	16.39%	3,221
Uinta	1,194	55.82%	914	42.73%	31	1.45%	280	13.09%	2,139
Washakie	609	64.31%	333	35.16%	5	0.53%	276	29.14%	947
Weston	1,073	68.65%	463	29.62%	27	1.73%	610	39.03%	1,563
Totals	35,091	64.15%	17,429	31.86%	2,180	3.99%	17,662	32.29%	54,700

==== Counties that flipped from Democratic to Republican ====
- Albany
- Big Horn
- Campbell
- Carbon
- Converse
- Crook
- Fremont
- Goshen
- Hot Springs
- Laramie
- Lincoln
- Natrona
- Niobrara
- Park
- Platte
- Sheridan
- Sweetwater
- Uinta
- Washakie

== See also ==
- United States presidential elections in Wyoming
