= 1936 United States presidential election in Wyoming =

- November 3, 1936

Nominee	Franklin D. Roosevelt	Alf Landon
Party	Democratic	Republican
Home state	New York	Kansas
Running mate	John Nance Garner	Frank Knox
Electoral vote	3	0
Popular vote	62,624	38,739
Percentage	60.58%	37.47%
County results
Roosevelt
40–50%
50–60%
60–70%
70–80%
Landon
50–60%
President before election
Franklin D. Roosevelt
Democratic
Elected President
Franklin D. Roosevelt
Democratic

The 1936 United States presidential election in Wyoming took place on November 3, 1936, as part of the 1936 United States presidential election. State voters chose three representatives, or electors, to the Electoral College, who voted for president and vice president.

Wyoming was won by the Democratic candidate, incumbent President Franklin D. Roosevelt, running with John Nance Garner, who was the 39th and incumbent Speaker of the United States House of Representatives, with 60.58 percent of the popular vote, against the Republican candidate, Alf Landon, who was the Governor of Kansas, running with future Secretary of the Navy Frank Knox, with 37.47 percent of the popular vote. Despite Landon losing by over 23 percent, Wyoming was nonetheless his strongest state West of the Great Plains and voted overall 0.93 percent more Republican than the nation at large. Roosevelt won Wyoming by 23 points, outperforming his victory in 1932 by 8 points.

As of the 2024 presidential election, this is the best ever performance by a Democratic presidential nominee in Wyoming, and the last election in which a Democrat has carried the following counties: Campbell, Converse, Niobrara, Sublette, Washakie and Weston, as even Lyndon B. Johnson failed to carry them when he won Wyoming by 13 points against Republican Barry Goldwater in 1964.

== Results ==
1936 United States presidential election in Wyoming
Party	Candidate	Votes	%
Democratic	Franklin D. Roosevelt (incumbent)	62,624	60.58%
Republican	Alfred Landon	38,739	37.47%
Union	William Lemke	1,653	1.60%
Socialist	Norman Thomas	200	0.19%
Communist	Earl Browder	91	0.09%
Prohibition	D. Leigh Colvin	75	0.07%
Total votes		103,382	100.00%

=== Results by county ===
County	Franklin D. Roosevelt Democratic		Alf Landon Republican		William Lemke Union		Other candidates Various parties		Margin		Total votes cast
County	#	%	#	%	#	%	#	%	#	%	Total votes cast
Albany	3,685	66.53%	1,777	32.08%	49	0.88%	28	0.51%	1,908	34.45%	5,539
Big Horn	3,156	60.28%	1,996	38.12%	73	1.39%	11	0.21%	1,160	22.15%	5,236
Campbell	1,435	51.54%	1,322	47.49%	21	0.75%	6	0.22%	113	4.06%	2,784
Carbon	3,257	60.62%	2,041	37.99%	51	0.95%	24	0.45%	1,216	22.63%	5,373
Converse	1,639	50.42%	1,556	47.86%	34	1.05%	22	0.68%	83	2.55%	3,251
Crook	1,088	46.30%	1,218	51.83%	38	1.62%	6	0.26%	-130	-5.53%	2,350
Fremont	3,050	55.12%	2,357	42.60%	107	1.93%	19	0.34%	693	12.52%	5,533
Goshen	2,639	55.55%	2,047	43.09%	47	0.99%	18	0.38%	592	12.46%	4,751
Hot Springs	1,419	61.19%	796	34.33%	89	3.84%	15	0.65%	623	26.87%	2,319
Johnson	949	40.68%	1,266	54.26%	109	4.67%	9	0.39%	-317	-13.59%	2,333
Laramie	7,594	62.55%	4,356	35.88%	151	1.24%	39	0.32%	3,238	26.67%	12,140
Lincoln	2,747	66.03%	1,376	33.08%	31	0.75%	6	0.14%	1,371	32.96%	4,160
Natrona	7,819	65.67%	3,810	32.00%	241	2.02%	37	0.31%	4,009	33.67%	11,907
Niobrara	1,124	50.07%	1,086	48.37%	28	1.25%	7	0.31%	38	1.69%	2,245
Park	2,594	60.12%	1,618	37.50%	92	2.13%	11	0.25%	976	22.62%	4,315
Platte	1,730	50.79%	1,546	45.39%	108	3.17%	22	0.65%	184	5.40%	3,406
Sheridan	4,731	61.60%	2,726	35.49%	204	2.66%	19	0.25%	2,005	26.11%	7,680
Sublette	667	49.85%	638	47.68%	27	2.02%	6	0.45%	29	2.17%	1,338
Sweetwater	6,232	76.97%	1,797	22.19%	32	0.40%	36	0.44%	4,435	54.77%	8,097
Teton	795	58.80%	501	37.06%	51	3.77%	5	0.37%	294	21.75%	1,352
Uinta	1,972	65.41%	1,015	33.67%	21	0.70%	7	0.23%	957	31.74%	3,015
Washakie	1,109	56.50%	810	41.26%	34	1.73%	10	0.51%	299	15.23%	1,963
Weston	1,193	51.98%	1,084	47.23%	15	0.65%	3	0.13%	109	4.75%	2,295
Totals	62,624	60.58%	38,739	37.47%	1,653	1.60%	366	0.35%	23,885	23.10%	103,382

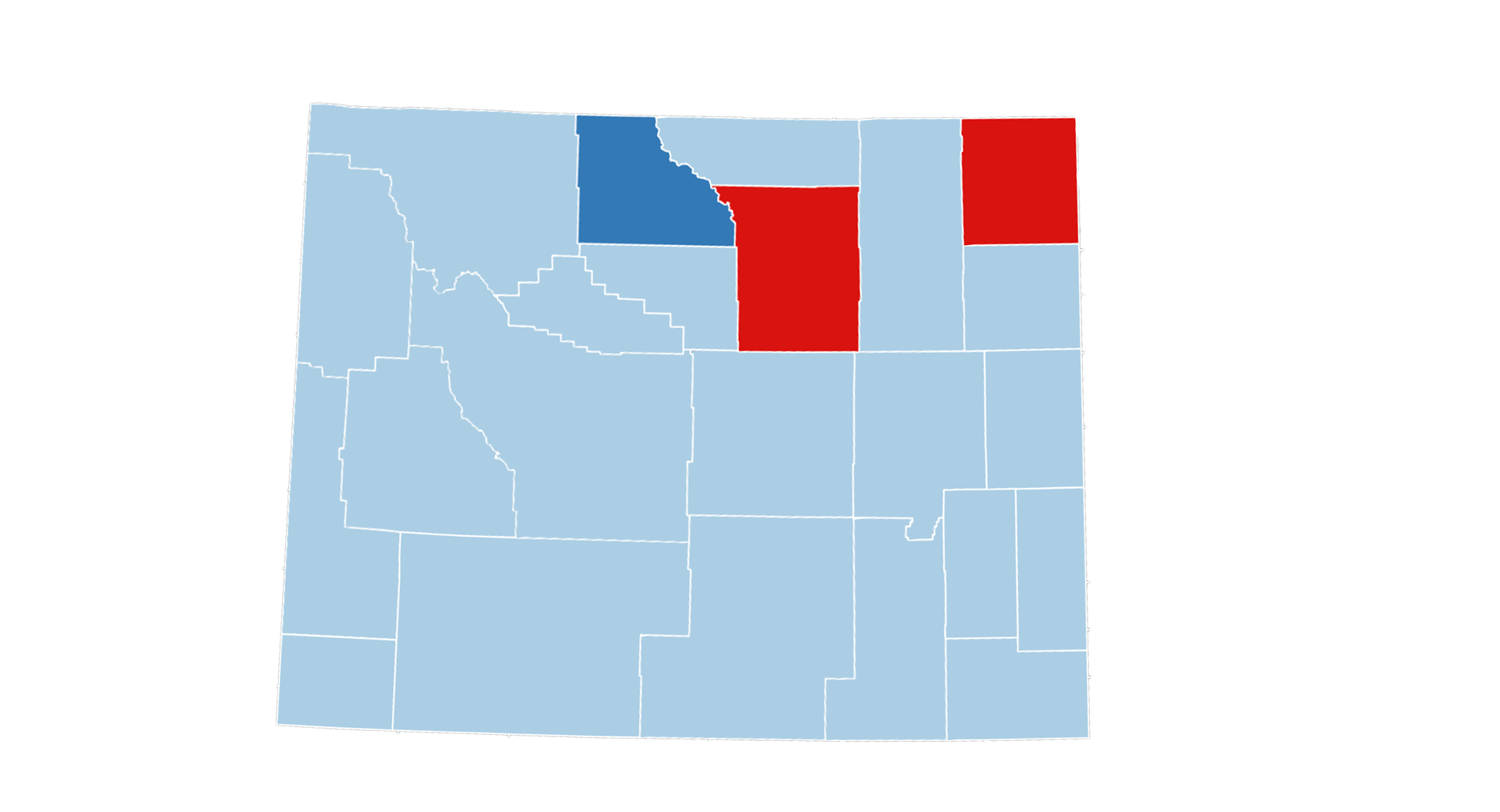
County flips from 1932: Democratic Hold Gain from Republican / Republican Gain from Democratic

==== Counties that flipped from Republican to Democratic ====
- Big Horn

==== Counties that flipped from Democratic to Republican ====
- Crook
- Johnson

== See also ==
- United States presidential elections in Wyoming
