= 1932 United States presidential election in Wyoming =

- November 8, 1932

| Nominee | Franklin D. Roosevelt | Herbert Hoover |
| Party | Democratic | Republican |
| Home state | New York | California |
| Running mate | John Nance Garner | Charles Curtis |
| Electoral vote | 3 | 0 |
| Popular vote | 54,370 | 39,583 |
| Percentage | 56.07% | 40.82% |
County results
Roosevelt
40–50%
50–60%
60–70%
Hoover
50–60%
President before election
Herbert Hoover
Republican
Elected President
Franklin D. Roosevelt
Democratic

The 1932 United States presidential election in Wyoming took place on November 8, 1932, as part of the 1932 United States presidential election. State voters chose three representatives, or electors, to the Electoral College, who voted for president and vice president.

Wyoming was won by the Democratic nominee, the 44th Governor of New York, Franklin D. Roosevelt, running with John Nance Garner, the 39th Speaker of the United States House of Representatives, with 56.07 percent of the popular vote, against the incumbent Republican President Herbert Hoover and Vice President Charles Curtis, with 40.82 percent of the popular vote, a 15.3% margin of victory. As of the 2024 presidential election, this is the last election in which Johnson County and Crook County have voted for a Democratic presidential candidate, despite the fact that Roosevelt would win statewide by a larger margin 4 years later, in 1936.

Despite the fact that Hoover had easily carried Wyoming by over 28 points in 1928, Roosevelt easily flipped the state, although his 15.3% margin of victory was slightly less than his national popular vote margin of 17.8%; thus Wyoming voted 2.5% to the right of the nation in this election.

Though the previous decade had been a fiercely Republican age in American politics, with the beginning of the Great Depression in 1929, voters blamed Republicans for the economic downturn, especially President Herbert Hoover, whom they viewed as not doing enough to alleviate their struggles while siding with big business. Roosevelt promised to enact a series of legislative proposals, collectively called The New Deal, to end the Great Depression. Roosevelt campaigned cautiously, trying to minimize gaffes while keeping the attention on his opponent, who was so unpopular that wherever he went, he often had items thrown at him, and was publicly opposed by numerous prominent Republicans such as Senators Bronson Cutting and Henry Wallace. Though both campaigns spent heavily on radio, Roosevelt employed it more effectively, using it to craft a persona that voters believed cared about them, while also hiding his paralysis due to Polio.

Roosevelt's victory was the beginning of a major realignment in American politics, with him beginning the "New Deal" coalition, a coalition that would favor the Democratic Party in elections up until its demise in the 1970s. During this period, though Republicans controlled the presidency more, Democrats maintained a firm grip on Congress, controlling both chambers with the exceptions of 1947-49 and 1953–55, all the way up until Republicans regained control of the Senate in the Reagan Revolution in 1980. Roosevelt's liberal big government policies remain a large part of the Democratic Party's platform in the modern era, with many of the programs he enacted, such as Social Security remaining in effect and popular with voters, so much so to the point where most politicians avoid mentioning changing it at all.

== Results ==
1932 United States presidential election in Wyoming
| Party | Candidate | Votes | % |
|---|---|---|---|
| Democratic | Franklin D. Roosevelt | 54,370 | 56.07% |
| Republican | Herbert Hoover (incumbent) | 39,583 | 40.82% |
| Socialist | Norman Thomas | 2,829 | 2.92% |
| Communist | William Z. Foster | 180 | 0.19% |
| Total votes | | 96,962 | 100.00% |

=== Results by county ===
| County | Franklin D. Roosevelt Democratic | | Herbert Hoover Republican | | Norman Thomas Socialist | | William Z. Foster Communist | | Margin | | Total votes cast |
| County | # | % | # | % | # | % | # | % | # | % | Total votes cast |
|---|---|---|---|---|---|---|---|---|---|---|---|
| Albany | 2,665 | 50.39% | 2,281 | 43.13% | 337 | 6.37% | 6 | 0.11% | 384 | 7.26% | 5,289 |
| Big Horn | 2,155 | 47.23% | 2,334 | 51.15% | 73 | 1.60% | 1 | 0.02% | -179 | -3.92% | 4,563 |
| Campbell | 1,728 | 57.99% | 1,161 | 38.96% | 83 | 2.79% | 8 | 0.27% | 567 | 19.03% | 2,980 |
| Carbon | 2,836 | 55.90% | 2,088 | 41.16% | 124 | 2.44% | 25 | 0.49% | 748 | 14.74% | 5,073 |
| Converse | 1,860 | 53.49% | 1,569 | 45.13% | 46 | 1.32% | 2 | 0.06% | 291 | 8.36% | 3,477 |
| Crook | 1,317 | 54.58% | 1,062 | 44.01% | 34 | 1.41% | 0 | 0.00% | 255 | 10.57% | 2,413 |
| Fremont | 2,612 | 59.72% | 1,696 | 38.77% | 61 | 1.39% | 5 | 0.11% | 916 | 20.95% | 4,374 |
| Goshen | 2,545 | 55.45% | 1,954 | 42.57% | 76 | 1.66% | 15 | 0.33% | 591 | 12.88% | 4,590 |
| Hot Springs | 1,466 | 62.30% | 742 | 31.53% | 133 | 5.65% | 12 | 0.51% | 724 | 30.77% | 2,353 |
| Johnson | 1,171 | 50.04% | 1,101 | 47.05% | 68 | 2.91% | 0 | 0.00% | 70 | 2.99% | 2,340 |
| Laramie | 5,435 | 49.69% | 5,116 | 46.77% | 383 | 3.50% | 4 | 0.04% | 319 | 2.92% | 10,938 |
| Lincoln | 2,275 | 56.79% | 1,673 | 41.76% | 55 | 1.37% | 3 | 0.07% | 602 | 15.03% | 4,006 |
| Natrona | 6,777 | 58.76% | 4,368 | 37.87% | 372 | 3.23% | 16 | 0.14% | 2,409 | 20.89% | 11,533 |
| Niobrara | 1,237 | 56.61% | 908 | 41.56% | 39 | 1.78% | 1 | 0.05% | 329 | 15.05% | 2,185 |
| Park | 2,043 | 54.38% | 1,600 | 42.59% | 113 | 3.01% | 1 | 0.03% | 443 | 11.79% | 3,757 |
| Platte | 1,893 | 52.24% | 1,430 | 39.46% | 296 | 8.17% | 5 | 0.14% | 463 | 12.78% | 3,624 |
| Sheridan | 4,260 | 59.65% | 2,738 | 38.34% | 143 | 2.00% | 1 | 0.01% | 1,522 | 21.31% | 7,142 |
| Sublette | 633 | 54.01% | 512 | 43.69% | 25 | 2.13% | 2 | 0.17% | 121 | 10.32% | 1,172 |
| Sweetwater | 4,637 | 66.40% | 2,043 | 29.26% | 239 | 3.42% | 64 | 0.92% | 2,594 | 37.14% | 6,983 |
| Teton | 699 | 62.69% | 406 | 36.41% | 10 | 0.90% | 0 | 0.00% | 293 | 26.28% | 1,115 |
| Uinta | 1,658 | 56.05% | 1,250 | 42.26% | 44 | 1.49% | 6 | 0.20% | 408 | 13.79% | 2,958 |
| Washakie | 1,009 | 57.62% | 711 | 40.61% | 30 | 1.71% | 1 | 0.06% | 298 | 17.01% | 1,751 |
| Weston | 1,459 | 62.19% | 840 | 35.81% | 45 | 1.92% | 2 | 0.09% | 619 | 26.38% | 2,346 |
| Totals | 54,370 | 56.07% | 39,583 | 40.82% | 2,829 | 2.92% | 180 | 0.19% | 14,787 | 15.25% | 96,962 |

County flips from 1928: Democratic Hold Gain from Republican Republican Hold

==== Counties that flipped from Republican to Democratic ====
- Albany
- Campbell
- Carbon
- Converse
- Crook
- Fremont
- Goshen
- Hot Springs
- Johnson
- Laramie
- Lincoln
- Natrona
- Niobrara
- Park
- Platte
- Sheridan
- Sublette
- Teton
- Uinta
- Washakie
- Weston

== See also ==
- United States presidential elections in Wyoming
