= 2000 United States presidential election in Wyoming =

- November 7, 2000

Nominee	George W. Bush	Al Gore
Party	Republican	Democratic
Home state	Texas	Tennessee
Running mate	Dick Cheney	Joe Lieberman
Electoral vote	3	0
Popular vote	147,947	60,481
Percentage	67.76%	27.70%
County results
Bush
50–60%
60–70%
70–80%
80–90%
President before election
Bill Clinton
Democratic
Elected President
George W. Bush
Republican

The 2000 United States presidential election in Wyoming took place on November 7, 2000, and was part of the 2000 United States presidential election. Voters chose three representatives, or electors, to the Electoral College, who voted for president and vice president.

Wyoming was won by incumbent Texas Governor George W. Bush by a massive 40.06% margin of victory, and his 67.76% of the popular vote made the state his strongest victory in the 2000 election. He was accompanied on the Republican ticket by vice presidential nominee Dick Cheney, formerly a member of the U.S. House of Representatives from Wyoming's at-large district.

As of the 2024 presidential election, this is the last time a Republican won Teton County, and thus is also the last time a nominee of any party carried every county in the state, even though subsequent Republican nominees such as Donald Trump have exceeded Bush's share of the overall vote in Wyoming.

== Results ==
2000 United States presidential election in Wyoming
Party	Candidate	Votes	Percentage	Electoral votes
Republican	George W. Bush	147,947	67.76%	3
Democratic	Al Gore	60,481	27.70%	0
Write-in	Ralph Nader	4,625	2.12%	0
Reform	Pat Buchanan	2,724	1.25%	0
Libertarian	Harry Browne	1,443	0.66%	0

=== By county ===
County	George W. Bush Republican		Al Gore Democratic		Various candidates Other parties		Margin		Total votes cast
County	#	%	#	%	#	%	#	%	Total votes cast
Albany	7,814	55.22%	5,069	35.82%	1,268	8.96%	2,745	19.40%	14,151
Big Horn	3,720	75.64%	1,004	20.41%	194	3.94%	2,716	55.23%	4,918
Campbell	10,203	81.36%	1,967	15.69%	370	2.95%	8,236	65.67%	12,540
Carbon	4,498	64.55%	2,206	31.66%	264	3.79%	2,292	32.89%	6,968
Converse	3,919	75.73%	1,076	20.79%	180	3.48%	2,843	54.94%	5,175
Crook	2,289	83.60%	361	13.18%	88	3.21%	1,928	70.42%	2,738
Fremont	10,560	68.38%	4,172	27.01%	712	4.61%	6,388	41.37%	15,444
Goshen	3,922	71.05%	1,439	26.07%	159	2.88%	2,483	44.98%	5,520
Hot Springs	1,733	73.68%	544	23.13%	75	3.19%	1,189	50.55%	2,352
Johnson	2,886	81.30%	555	15.63%	109	3.07%	2,331	65.67%	3,550
Laramie	21,797	61.71%	12,162	34.43%	1,364	3.86%	9,635	27.28%	35,323
Lincoln	5,415	79.11%	1,184	17.30%	246	3.59%	4,231	61.81%	6,845
Natrona	18,439	64.95%	8,646	30.46%	1,303	4.59%	9,793	34.49%	28,388
Niobrara	888	78.79%	190	16.86%	49	4.35%	698	61.93%	1,127
Park	9,884	77.00%	2,424	18.88%	528	4.11%	7,460	58.12%	12,836
Platte	2,925	66.89%	1,249	28.56%	199	4.55%	1,676	38.33%	4,373
Sheridan	8,424	68.85%	3,330	27.21%	482	3.94%	5,094	41.64%	12,236
Sublette	2,624	81.59%	458	14.24%	134	4.17%	2,166	67.35%	3,216
Sweetwater	9,425	60.07%	5,521	35.19%	745	4.75%	3,904	24.88%	15,691
Teton	5,454	52.29%	4,019	38.53%	958	9.18%	1,435	13.76%	10,431
Uinta	5,469	73.73%	1,650	22.24%	299	4.03%	3,819	51.49%	7,418
Washakie	3,138	77.46%	806	19.90%	107	2.64%	2,332	57.56%	4,051
Weston	2,521	82.39%	449	14.67%	90	2.94%	2,072	67.72%	3,060
Total	147,947	67.76%	60,481	27.70%	9,923	4.54%	87,466	40.06%	218,351

Counties that flipped from Democratic to Republican

- Albany (largest city: Laramie)
- Sweetwater (largest city: Rock Springs)
- Teton (largest city: Jackson)
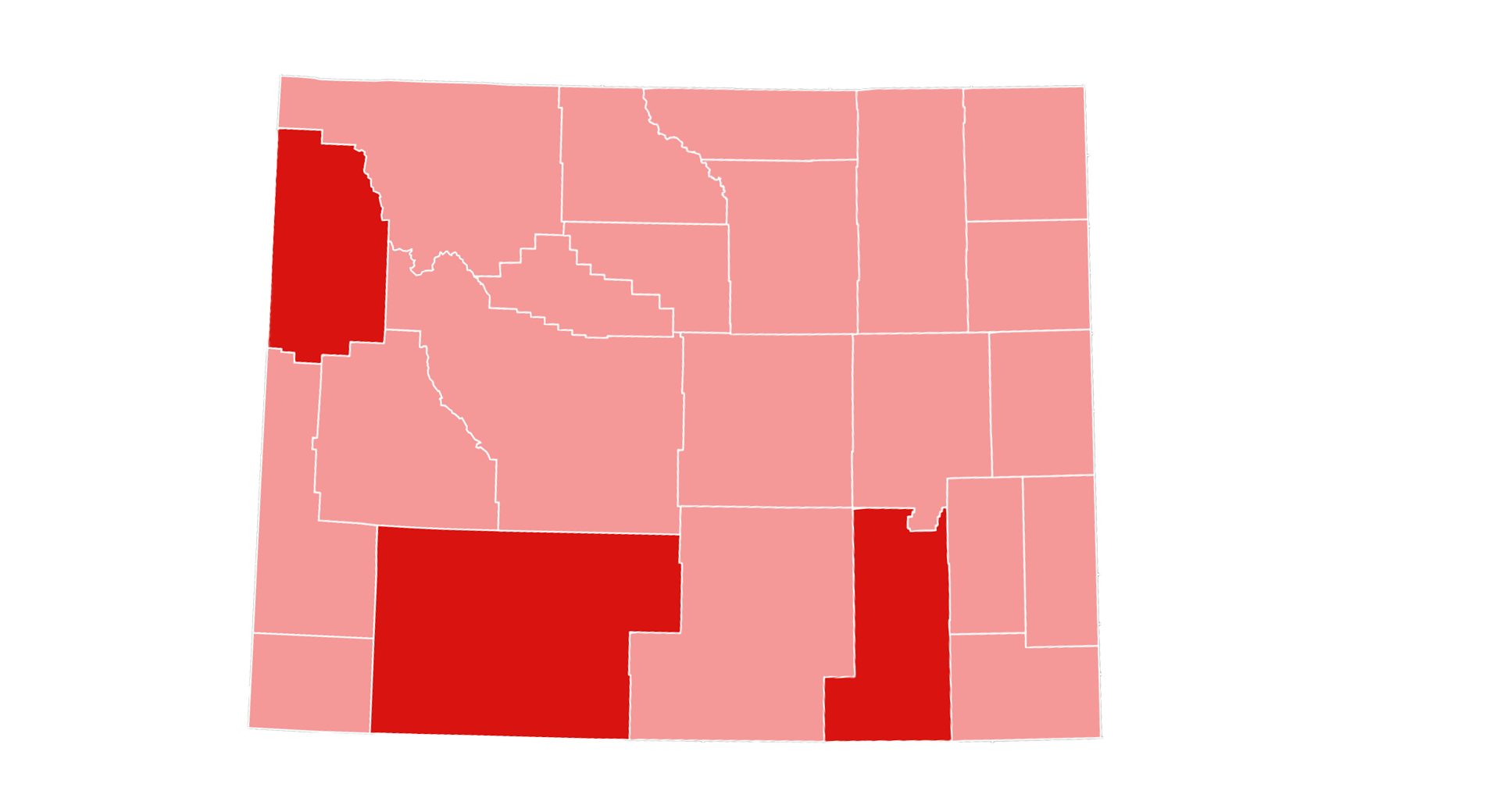

=== By congressional district ===
Due to the state's low population, only one congressional district is allocated. This district is called the at-large district because it covers the entire state, and thus is equivalent to the statewide election results.

District	Bush	Gore	Representative
At-large	67.8%	27.7%	Barbara Cubin

== Electors ==
The electors of each state and the District of Columbia met on December 18, 2000 to cast their votes for president and vice president. The Electoral College itself never meets as one body. Instead, the electors from each state and the District of Columbia met in their respective capitols.

The following were the members of the Electoral College from the state. All were pledged to and voted for George Bush and Dick Cheney:

1. Judy Catchpole
2. Gale Geringer
3. John Patton

== See also ==
- United States presidential elections in Wyoming
- Presidency of George W. Bush
