= 1912 United States presidential election in Wyoming =

- November 5, 1912

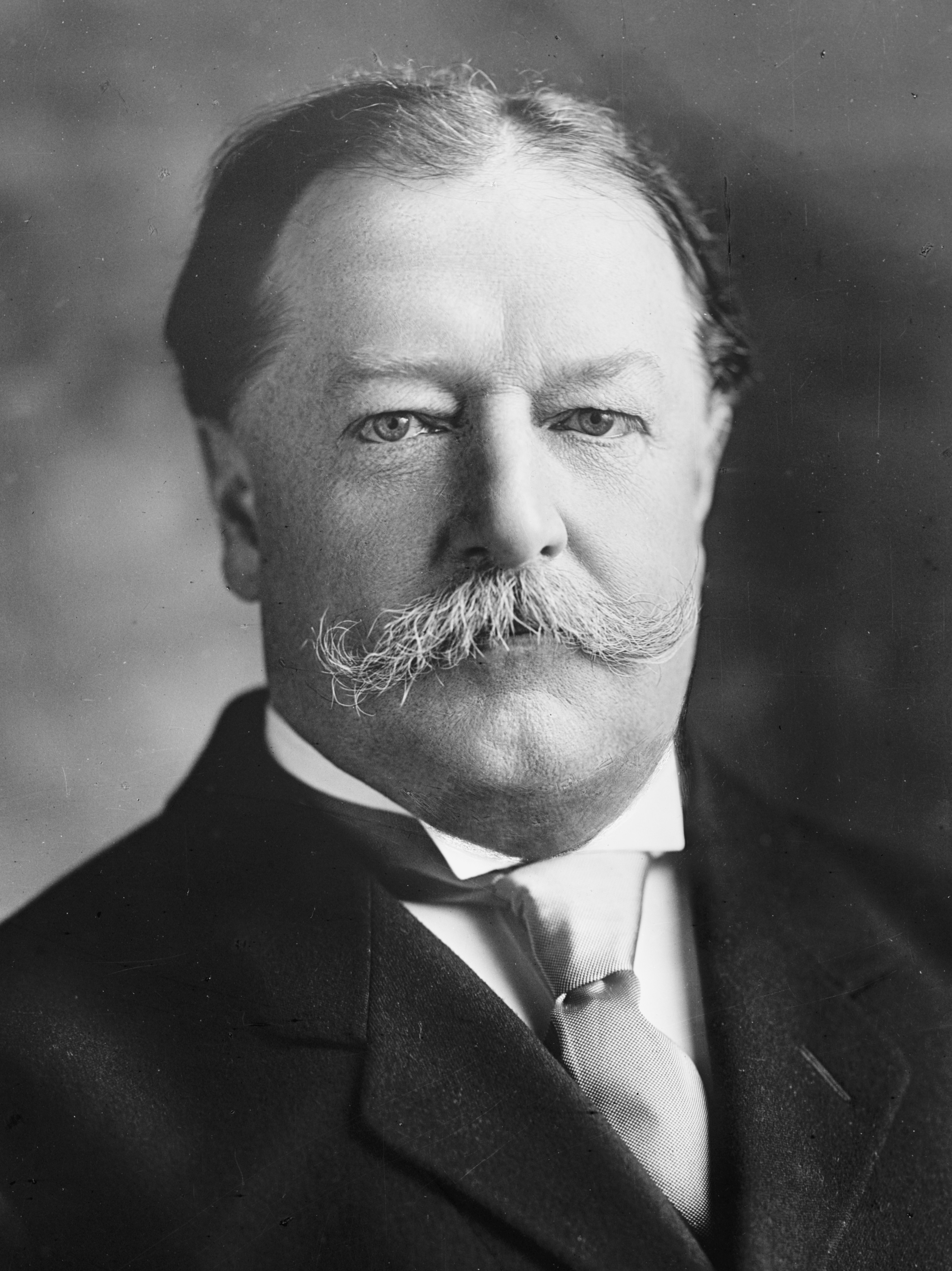

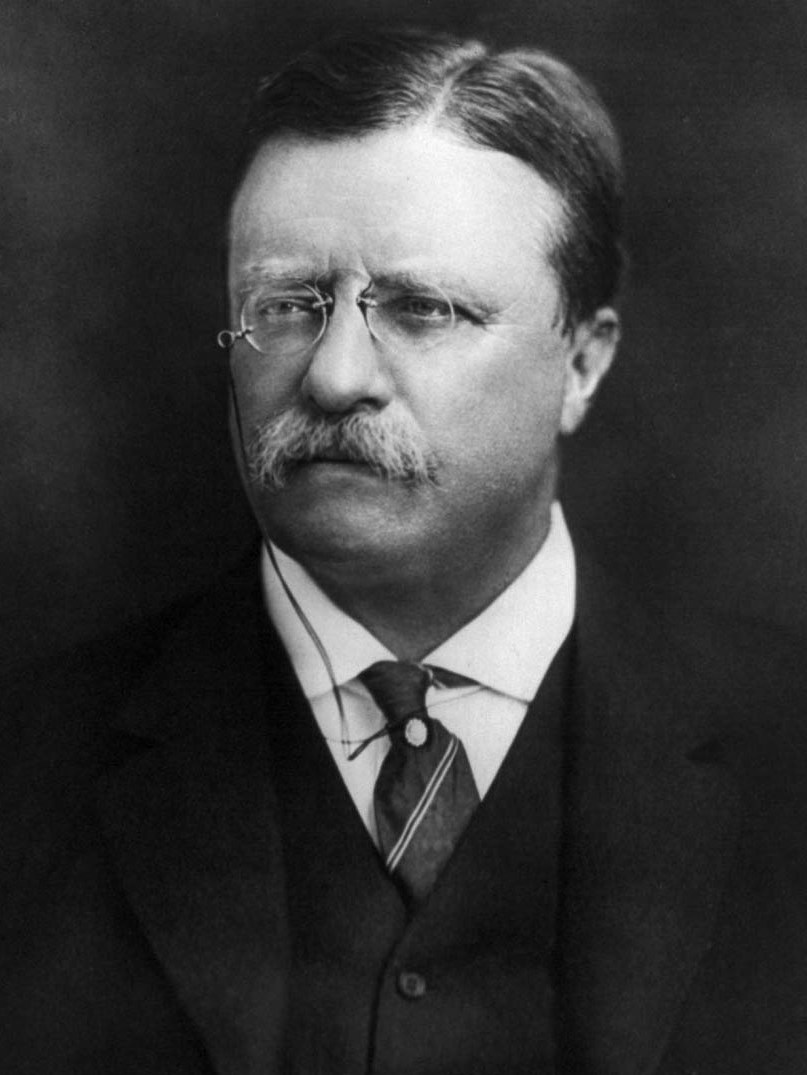

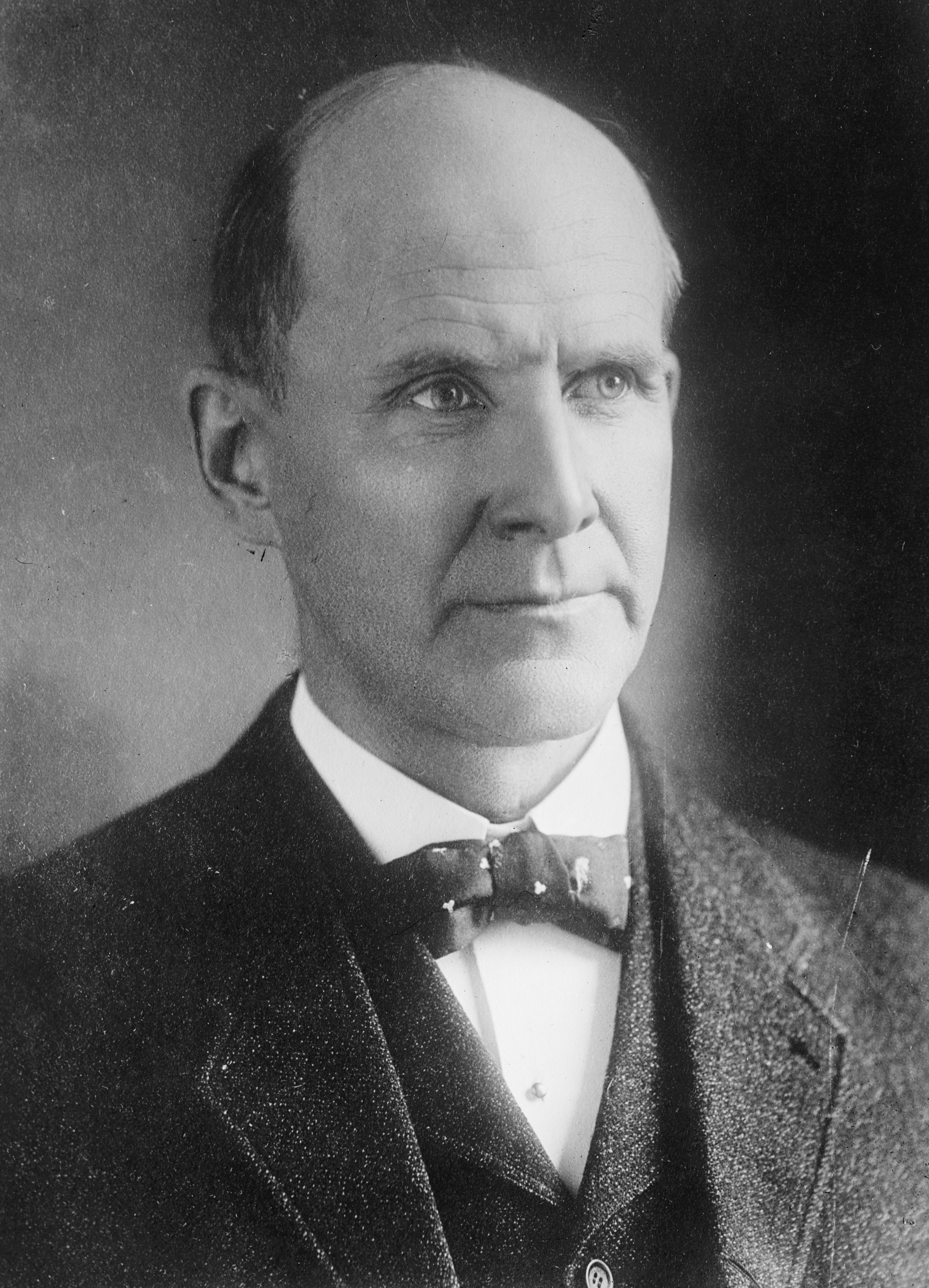
Nominee	Woodrow Wilson	William Howard Taft
Party	Democratic	Republican
Home state	New Jersey	Ohio
Running mate	Thomas R. Marshall	Nicholas Murray Butler
Electoral vote	3	0
Popular vote	15,310	14,560
Percentage	36.20%	34.42%
Nominee	Theodore Roosevelt	Eugene V. Debs
Party	Progressive	Socialist
Home state	New York	Indiana
Running mate	Hiram Johnson	Emil Seidel
Electoral vote	0	0
Popular vote	9,232	2,760
Percentage	21.83%	6.53%
County results
Wilson
30–40%
40–50%
Taft
30–40%
40–50%
President before election
William Howard Taft
Republican
Elected President
Woodrow Wilson
Democratic

The 1912 United States presidential election in Wyoming took place on November 5, 1912, as part of the 1912 United States presidential election. State voters chose three representatives, or electors, to the Electoral College, who voted for president and vice president.

Wyoming was won by Princeton University President Woodrow Wilson (D–Virginia), running with governor of Indiana Thomas R. Marshall, with 36.20 percent of the popular vote, against the 27th president of the United States William Howard Taft (R–Ohio), running with Columbia University President Nicholas Murray Butler, with 34.42 percent of the popular vote, the 26th president of the United States Theodore Roosevelt (P–New York), running with governor of California Hiram Johnson, with 21.83 percent of the popular vote and the five-time candidate of the Socialist Party of America for President of the United States Eugene V. Debs (S–Indiana), running with the first Socialist mayor of a major city in the United States Emil Seidel, with 6.53 percent of the popular vote.

Despite having a member of the Progressive Party (Joseph M. Carey) as the governor of the state, Theodore Roosevelt came in third and Wyoming was one of the areas Roosevelt received lower levels of support.

== Results ==
General Election Results
Party	Pledged to	Elector	Votes
Democratic Party	Woodrow Wilson	Thomas M. Hyde	15,310
Democratic Party	Woodrow Wilson	John Charles Thompson	15,155
Democratic Party	Woodrow Wilson	Peter Kinney	15,152
Republican Party	William Howard Taft	John E. Higgins	14,560
Republican Party	William Howard Taft	Andrew Olson	14,376
Republican Party	William Howard Taft	William B. Sleeper	14,307
Progressive Party	Theodore Roosevelt	Thomas Blyth	9,232
Progressive Party	Theodore Roosevelt	Helen B. Grant	9,132
Progressive Party	Theodore Roosevelt	Robert R. Selway	9,093
Socialist Party	Eugene V. Debs	Otto Humberger	2,760
Socialist Party	Eugene V. Debs	Paul J. Paulson	2,715
Socialist Party	Eugene V. Debs	John Suaja Jr.	2,670
Prohibition Party	Eugene W. Chafin	William H. Clark	434
Prohibition Party	Eugene W. Chafin	A. B. Campbell	421
Prohibition Party	Eugene W. Chafin	A. F. Shultz	403
Votes cast (Note: Based on totals for highest elector on each ticket)			42,296

=== Results by county ===
County	Woodrow Wilson Democratic		William Howard Taft Republican		Theodore Roosevelt Progressive "Bull Moose"		Eugene V. Debs Socialist		Eugene W. Chafin Prohibition		Margin		Total votes cast (Note: Based on highest elector on each ticket)
County	#	%	#	%	#	%	#	%	#	%	#	%	Total votes cast
Albany	1,044	38.77%	882	32.75%	531	19.72%	177	6.57%	59	2.19%	162	6.02%	2,693
Big Horn	691	30.83%	794	35.43%	594	26.51%	136	6.07%	26	1.16%	-103	-4.60%	2,241
Campbell	361	48.78%	186	25.14%	163	22.03%	19	2.57%	11	1.49%	175	23.64%	740
Carbon	957	33.88%	1,106	39.15%	489	17.31%	258	9.13%	15	0.53%	-149	-5.27%	2,825
Converse	436	31.62%	540	39.16%	349	25.31%	40	2.90%	14	1.02%	-104	-7.54%	1,379
Crook	726	38.78%	505	26.98%	461	24.63%	166	8.87%	14	0.75%	221	11.80%	1,872
Fremont	993	40.45%	811	33.03%	511	20.81%	131	5.34%	9	0.37%	182	7.42%	2,455
Goshen	318	35.41%	292	32.52%	235	26.17%	23	2.56%	30	3.34%	26	2.89%	898
Hot Springs	343	34.10%	273	27.14%	298	29.62%	80	7.95%	12	1.19%	45 (Note: In this county where Roosevelt ran second ahead of Taft, margin given is Wilson vote minus Roosevelt vote and percentage margin Wilson percentage minus Roosevelt percentage.)	4.48%	1,006
Johnson	524	37.54%	522	37.39%	327	23.42%	21	1.50%	2	0.14%	2	0.15%	1,396
Laramie	1,923	40.03%	1,871	38.95%	835	17.38%	131	2.73%	44	0.92%	52	1.08%	4,804
Lincoln	1,028	30.43%	1,430	42.33%	580	17.17%	334	9.89%	6	0.18%	-402	-11.90%	3,378
Natrona	447	31.79%	640	45.52%	262	18.63%	52	3.70%	5	0.36%	-193	-13.73%	1,406
Niobrara	282	27.84%	500	49.36%	142	14.02%	30	2.96%	59	5.82%	-218	-21.52%	1,013
Park	672	37.50%	534	29.80%	470	26.23%	88	4.91%	28	1.56%	138	7.70%	1,792
Platte	785	44.48%	500	28.33%	353	20.00%	87	4.93%	40	2.27%	285	16.15%	1,765
Sheridan	1,649	38.82%	862	20.29%	1,305	30.72%	398	9.37%	34	0.80%	344	8.10%	4,248
Sweetwater	916	36.89%	888	35.76%	390	15.71%	279	11.24%	10	0.40%	28	1.13%	2,483
Uinta	535	27.84%	717	37.30%	463	24.09%	207	10.77%	0	0.00%	-182	-9.46%	1,922
Washakie	221	32.74%	258	38.22%	168	24.89%	23	3.41%	5	0.74%	-37	-5.48%	675
Weston	459	35.17%	449	34.41%	306	23.45%	80	6.13%	11	0.84%	10	0.76%	1,305
Totals	15,310	36.20%	14,560	34.42%	9,232	21.83%	2,760	6.53%	434	1.03%	750	1.78%	42,296

==== Counties that flipped from Republican to Democratic ====
- Albany
- Crook
- Fremont
- Johnson
- Laramie
- Sheridan
- Sweetwater
- Weston

== See also ==
- United States presidential elections in Wyoming
