= 1972 United States presidential election in Wyoming =

- November 7, 1972

Nominee	Richard Nixon	George McGovern
Party	Republican	Democratic
Home state	California	South Dakota
Running mate	Spiro Agnew	Sargent Shriver
Electoral vote	3	0
Popular vote	100,464	44,358
Percentage	69.01%	30.47%
County results
Nixon
50–60%
60–70%
70–80%
80–90%
President before election
Richard Nixon
Republican
Elected President
Richard Nixon
Republican

The 1972 United States presidential election in Wyoming took place on November 7, 1972. All 50 states and the District of Columbia were part of the 1972 United States presidential election. State voters chose three electors to the Electoral College, who voted for president and vice president.

Wyoming was won by the Republican nominees, incumbent President Richard Nixon of California and his running mate Vice President Spiro Agnew of Maryland. Nixon and Agnew defeated the Democratic nominees, Senator George McGovern of South Dakota and his running mate U.S. Ambassador Sargent Shriver of Maryland.

Nixon carried Wyoming with 69.01 percent of the vote to McGovern's 30.47 percent, a victory margin of 38.54 points. In a state that would reflect McGovern's national results, the Democratic nominee did not win a single county in Wyoming, making Nixon the first Republican to carry Sweetwater County and thus to sweep all of Wyoming's counties since Warren G. Harding in 1920.

== Results ==
1972 United States presidential election in Wyoming
Party	Candidate	Votes	%
Republican	Richard Nixon (inc.)	100,464	69.01%
Democratic	George McGovern	44,358	30.47%
Independent	John G. Schmitz (write-in)	748	0.52%
Total votes		145,570	100.00%

=== Results by county ===
County	Richard Nixon Republican		George McGovern Democratic		John G. Schmitz Independent		Margin		Total votes cast
County	#	%	#	%	#	%	#	%	Total votes cast
Albany	7,021	58.92%	4,873	40.89%	23	0.19%	2,148	18.03%	11,917
Big Horn	3,244	75.44%	1,049	24.40%	7	0.16%	2,195	51.04%	4,300
Campbell	2,953	78.64%	783	20.85%	19	0.51%	2,170	57.79%	3,755
Carbon	4,037	63.69%	2,292	36.16%	10	0.16%	1,745	27.53%	6,339
Converse	2,312	77.06%	682	22.73%	6	0.20%	1,630	54.33%	3,000
Crook	1,760	83.41%	339	16.07%	11	0.52%	1,421	67.34%	2,110
Fremont	7,359	69.12%	3,248	30.51%	40	0.38%	4,111	38.61%	10,647
Goshen	3,629	70.27%	1,515	29.34%	20	0.39%	2,114	40.93%	5,164
Hot Springs	1,678	70.89%	689	29.11%	0	0.00%	989	40.78%	2,367
Johnson	2,203	83.13%	436	16.45%	11	0.42%	1,767	66.68%	2,650
Laramie	15,010	65.67%	7,791	34.09%	54	0.24%	7,219	31.58%	22,855
Lincoln	2,459	67.08%	969	26.43%	238	6.49%	1,490	40.65%	3,666
Natrona	15,649	70.49%	6,514	29.34%	37	0.16%	9,135	41.15%	22,200
Niobrara	1,245	81.00%	289	18.80%	3	0.20%	956	62.20%	1,537
Park	5,890	74.79%	1,950	24.76%	35	0.44%	3,940	50.03%	7,875
Platte	2,200	70.35%	925	29.58%	2	0.06%	1,275	40.77%	3,127
Sheridan	6,432	69.03%	2,874	30.84%	12	0.13%	3,558	38.19%	9,318
Sublette	1,348	81.55%	304	18.39%	1	0.06%	1,044	63.16%	1,653
Sweetwater	5,175	58.05%	3,713	41.65%	27	0.30%	1,462	16.40%	8,915
Teton	2,182	70.03%	810	25.99%	124	3.98%	1,372	44.04%	3,116
Uinta	2,011	67.03%	968	32.27%	21	0.70%	1,043	34.76%	3,000
Washakie	2,604	75.92%	825	24.05%	1	0.03%	1,779	51.87%	3,430
Weston	2,063	78.47%	520	19.78%	46	1.75%	1,543	58.69%	2,629
Totals	100,464	69.01%	44,358	30.47%	748	0.51%	56,106	38.54%	145,570

== See also ==
- United States presidential elections in Wyoming
