= 1984 United States presidential election in Wyoming =

- November 6, 1984

Nominee	Ronald Reagan	Walter Mondale
Party	Republican	Democratic
Home state	California	Minnesota
Running mate	George H. W. Bush	Geraldine Ferraro
Electoral vote	3	0
Popular vote	133,241	53,370
Percentage	70.51%	28.24%
County results
Reagan
60–70%
70–80%
80–90%
President before election
Ronald Reagan
Republican
Elected President
Ronald Reagan
Republican

The 1984 United States presidential election in Wyoming took place on November 6, 1984. All 50 states and the District of Columbia, were part of the 1984 United States presidential election. State voters chose three electors to the Electoral College, which selected the president and vice president of the United States.

Wyoming was won by incumbent United States President Ronald Reagan of California, who was running against former Vice President Walter Mondale of Minnesota. Reagan ran for a second time with incumbent Vice President and former C.I.A. Director George H. W. Bush of Texas, and Mondale ran with Representative Geraldine Ferraro of New York, the first major female candidate for the vice presidency.

The election was a very partisan election for Wyoming, with just under 99 percent of the electorate voting for either the Democratic or Republican parties, and only three parties appearing on the ballot. Reagan won every county in Wyoming by a majority, a particularly strong turnout even in this typically conservative leaning state. The Republican turnout was softest in the middle southern part of the state, inclusive and extending west of Laramie, but it is ubiquitous.

Wyoming weighed in for this election as 24 points more Republican than the national average. With 70.51% of the popular vote, the state proved to be Reagan's fourth-strongest state in the election after Utah, Idaho, and Nebraska. Reagan won the election in Wyoming with a 42-point landslide, the strongest-ever performance by any presidential nominee in the state until Donald Trump in 2024. This election was the only time that a Republican won consecutive presidential elections by carrying all of Wyoming's counties in both instances.

== Results ==
1984 United States presidential election in Wyoming
Party	Candidate	Votes	Percentage	Electoral votes
Republican	Ronald Reagan (incumbent)	133,241	70.51%	3
Democratic	Walter Mondale	53,370	28.24%	0
Libertarian	David Bergland	2,357	1.25%	0
Totals		188,968	100.00%	3

=== Results by county ===
County	Ronald Reagan Republican		Walter Mondale Democratic		David Bergland Libertarian		Margin		Total
County	#	%	#	%	#	%	#	%	Total
Albany	7,452	60.36%	4,708	38.13%	186	1.51%	2,744	22.23%	12,346
Big Horn	4,019	76.51%	1,175	22.37%	59	1.12%	2,844	54.14%	5,253
Campbell	8,387	83.91%	1,525	15.26%	83	0.83%	6,862	68.65%	9,995
Carbon	4,557	65.55%	2,295	33.01%	100	1.44%	2,262	32.54%	6,952
Converse	3,542	78.31%	929	20.54%	52	1.15%	2,613	57.77%	4,523
Crook	2,286	83.01%	450	16.34%	18	0.65%	1,836	66.67%	2,754
Fremont	9,885	70.61%	3,969	28.35%	145	1.04%	5,916	42.26%	13,999
Goshen	3,776	72.84%	1,364	26.31%	44	0.85%	2,412	46.53%	5,184
Hot Springs	1,943	73.43%	672	25.40%	31	1.17%	1,271	48.03%	2,646
Johnson	2,634	81.27%	558	17.22%	49	1.51%	2,076	64.05%	3,241
Laramie	19,348	64.93%	10,110	33.93%	341	1.14%	9,238	31.00%	29,799
Lincoln	3,854	78.32%	1,021	20.75%	46	0.93%	2,833	57.57%	4,921
Natrona	18,488	69.86%	7,598	28.71%	378	1.43%	10,890	41.15%	26,464
Niobrara	1,098	80.79%	239	17.59%	22	1.62%	859	63.20%	1,359
Park	7,994	79.19%	1,965	19.47%	136	1.35%	6,029	59.72%	10,095
Platte	2,813	68.28%	1,232	29.90%	75	1.82%	1,581	38.38%	4,120
Sheridan	7,460	66.14%	3,648	32.34%	171	1.52%	3,812	33.80%	11,279
Sublette	1,976	82.47%	389	16.24%	31	1.29%	1,587	66.23%	2,396
Sweetwater	8,308	60.59%	5,230	38.14%	174	1.27%	3,078	22.45%	13,712
Teton	3,487	67.85%	1,565	30.45%	87	1.69%	1,922	37.40%	5,139
Uinta	4,075	75.31%	1,276	23.58%	60	1.11%	2,799	51.73%	5,411
Washakie	3,245	76.30%	970	22.81%	38	0.89%	2,275	53.49%	4,253
Weston	2,614	83.59%	482	15.41%	31	0.99%	2,132	68.18%	3,127
Totals	133,241	70.51%	53,370	28.24%	2,357	1.25%	79,871	42.27%	188,968

== See also ==
- United States presidential elections in Wyoming
- Presidency of Ronald Reagan
