= 1964 United States presidential election in Wyoming =

- November 3, 1964

Nominee	Lyndon B. Johnson	Barry Goldwater
Party	Democratic	Republican
Home state	Texas	Arizona
Running mate	Hubert Humphrey	William E. Miller
Electoral vote	3	0
Popular vote	80,718	61,998
Percentage	56.56%	43.44%
County results
Johnson
50–60%
60–70%
70–80%
Goldwater
50–60%
60–70%
President before election
Lyndon B. Johnson
Democratic
Elected President
Lyndon B. Johnson
Democratic

The 1964 United States presidential election in Wyoming took place on November 3, 1964, as part of the 1964 United States presidential election. State voters chose three representatives, or electors, to the Electoral College, who voted for president and vice president.

Wyoming was won by incumbent Democratic President Lyndon B. Johnson, with 56.56% of the popular vote, against the Republican nominee, Arizona Senator Barry Goldwater, with 43.44% of the popular vote, representing a margin of victory of 13.2%. Johnson's victory was part of a nationwide landslide in which he captured many traditionally Republican states, and Wyoming was no exception.

Johnson enjoyed bipartisan support due to sympathy over the Assassination of his predecessor John F. Kennedy in 1963, along with support for many of his programs such as the Great Society, which aimed to eliminate poverty in America, and the Civil Rights Act of 1964, which outlawed racial discrimination. Goldwater, a believer in free markets and low taxes, famously opposed both of these programs, and suggested making social security voluntary, which cost him a great deal of support among moderates – including Republicans – who viewed him as too conservative. Nelson Rockefeller and George W. Romney, the governors of New York and Michigan respectively, refused to endorse Goldwater. He did receive some support from Nixon and former President Dwight D. Eisenhower; however, the former wanted to see much of Goldwater's agenda struck down, while Eisenhower's support was limited to a single commercial, as he never fully forgave the Arizona Senator for calling many of his biggest accomplishments as president such as the Interstate Highway System "a dime store New Deal. Democrats successfully portrayed him as an extremist, most famously with the Daisy Television Ad. With Johnson's victory, Democrat Gale W. McGee held his Senate seat and Democrats flipped the state's sole congressional seat. They even managed to regain control of the Wyoming House of Representatives and got within a single seat of capturing the State Senate, an astounding achievement in a state that political pundits had written off in the years prior as "too Republican".

Despite his stunning defeat, Goldwater's campaign began a long term political realignment in American politics, with conservatives beginning to sway towards the Republican Party, ultimately culminating in the 1980 presidential victory of Ronald Reagan, who had supported Goldwater in 1964, famously giving a speech on his behalf titled "A Time For Choosing", which raised over $1 million for the Republican nominee's campaign, and launching Reagan into the national political spotlight. Additionally, many Northeastern liberals who had previously favored the Republicans began to move towards the Democrats, which would ultimately flip the Northeast blue in 1992.

As of 2024, this is the only presidential race since 1948 that Wyoming has voted Democratic; in fact, no Democratic presidential nominee since 1964 has reached even 40% of the state's vote. This is also the last occasion that Laramie County (home to the capital and largest city of Cheyenne), Fremont County, Sheridan County, Park County, Uinta County, Lincoln County, Goshen County, Big Horn County, Platte County, and Hot Springs County have voted for a Democratic presidential nominee.

== Results ==
1964 United States presidential election in Wyoming
Party	Candidate	Votes	%
Democratic	Lyndon B. Johnson (inc.)	80,718	56.56%
Republican	Barry Goldwater	61,998	43.44%
Total votes		142,716	100.00%

=== Results by county ===
County	Lyndon B. Johnson Democratic		Barry Goldwater Republican		Margin		Total votes cast
County	#	%	#	%	#	%	Total votes cast
Albany	6,019	67.31%	2,923	32.69%	3,096	34.62%	8,942
Big Horn	2,690	50.21%	2,668	49.79%	22	0.42%	5,358
Campbell	1,196	42.68%	1,606	57.32%	-410	-14.64%	2,802
Carbon	4,322	66.68%	2,160	33.32%	2,162	33.36%	6,482
Converse	1,250	44.50%	1,559	55.50%	-309	-11.00%	2,809
Crook	780	39.12%	1,214	60.88%	-434	-21.76%	1,994
Fremont	5,985	55.45%	4,809	44.55%	1,176	10.90%	10,794
Goshen	2,749	51.35%	2,604	48.65%	145	2.70%	5,353
Hot Springs	1,380	52.91%	1,228	47.09%	152	5.82%	2,608
Johnson	852	34.19%	1,640	65.81%	-788	-31.62%	2,492
Laramie	16,059	65.22%	8,563	34.78%	7,496	30.44%	24,622
Lincoln	2,273	55.66%	1,811	44.34%	462	11.32%	4,084
Natrona	11,167	52.42%	10,135	47.58%	1,032	4.84%	21,302
Niobrara	843	42.90%	1,122	57.10%	-279	-14.20%	1,965
Park	3,745	50.32%	3,698	49.68%	47	0.64%	7,443
Platte	1,890	56.25%	1,470	43.75%	420	12.50%	3,360
Sheridan	4,747	51.39%	4,491	48.61%	256	2.78%	9,238
Sublette	791	46.78%	900	53.22%	-109	-6.44%	1,691
Sweetwater	5,969	75.43%	1,944	24.57%	4,025	50.86%	7,913
Teton	968	47.24%	1,081	52.76%	-113	-5.52%	2,049
Uinta	1,929	61.93%	1,186	38.07%	743	23.86%	3,115
Washakie	1,695	49.74%	1,713	50.26%	-18	-0.52%	3,408
Weston	1,419	49.07%	1,473	50.93%	-54	-1.86%	2,892
Totals	80,718	56.56%	61,998	43.44%	18,720	13.12%	142,716

==== Counties that flipped from Republican to Democratic ====
- Albany
- Big Horn
- Fremont
- Goshen
- Hot Springs
- Lincoln
- Natrona
- Park
- Platte
- Sheridan
- Uinta

== See also ==
- United States presidential elections in Wyoming
