= Earnest Lynde =

American politician

Member of the Wyoming House of Representatives from the Campbell County district
- In office 1939–1941 Serving with R. B. Marquiss

Personal details
- Party: Democratic
- Children: 1
- Occupation: Politician

Earnest Lynde was an American politician from Recluse, Wyoming, who served a single term in the Wyoming House of Representatives, representing Campbell County from 1939 to 1941 (Note: According to the Wyoming Legislature, Lynde only served in 1939.) as a Democrat in the 25th Wyoming Legislature. Lynde represented Campbell County alongside Republican R. B. Marquiss.

Lynde was married; his son, John Lynde, died at the age of 18 in Rapid City, South Dakota, following complications from a mastoid operation.

== Notes ==
Wyoming House of Representatives
Preceded by —	Member of the Wyoming House of Representatives from the Campbell County district 1939–1941; Served alongside: R. B. Marquiss	Succeeded by —
