= William Pownall =

American politician

Member of the Wyoming House of Representatives from the 52nd district
- In office January 5, 2015 – January 4, 2021
- Preceded by: Troy Mader
- Succeeded by: Bill Fortner

Personal details
- Born: Gillette, Wyoming, U.S.
- Party: Republican
- Spouse: Jamey Pownall
- Children: 2
- Profession: Rancher

William H. "Bill" Pownall is an American politician and former Wyoming state legislator. A member of the Republican Party, Pownall represented the 52nd district in the Wyoming House of Representatives from 2015 to 2021. Prior to his tenure in the House, Pownall was the Campbell County Sheriff from 2005 to 2015.

== Elections ==
=== 2014 ===
Pownall challenged incumbent Republican Representative Troy Mader in the Republican primary. Mader, who had been appointed to the seat after Representative Sue Wallis died, ran for a full term. Pownall defeated Mader in the primary, 61% to 39%. He then won the general election unopposed.

=== 2016 ===
Pownall faced Nicholas DeLaat in the Republican primary and defeated DeLaat with 50.6% of the vote. He then defeated perennial Democratic candidate Duffy Jenniges with 81% of the vote.
