= Campbell County School District Number 1 =

School district in Wyoming, United States

Coordinates: 44°17′15″N 105°31′00″W

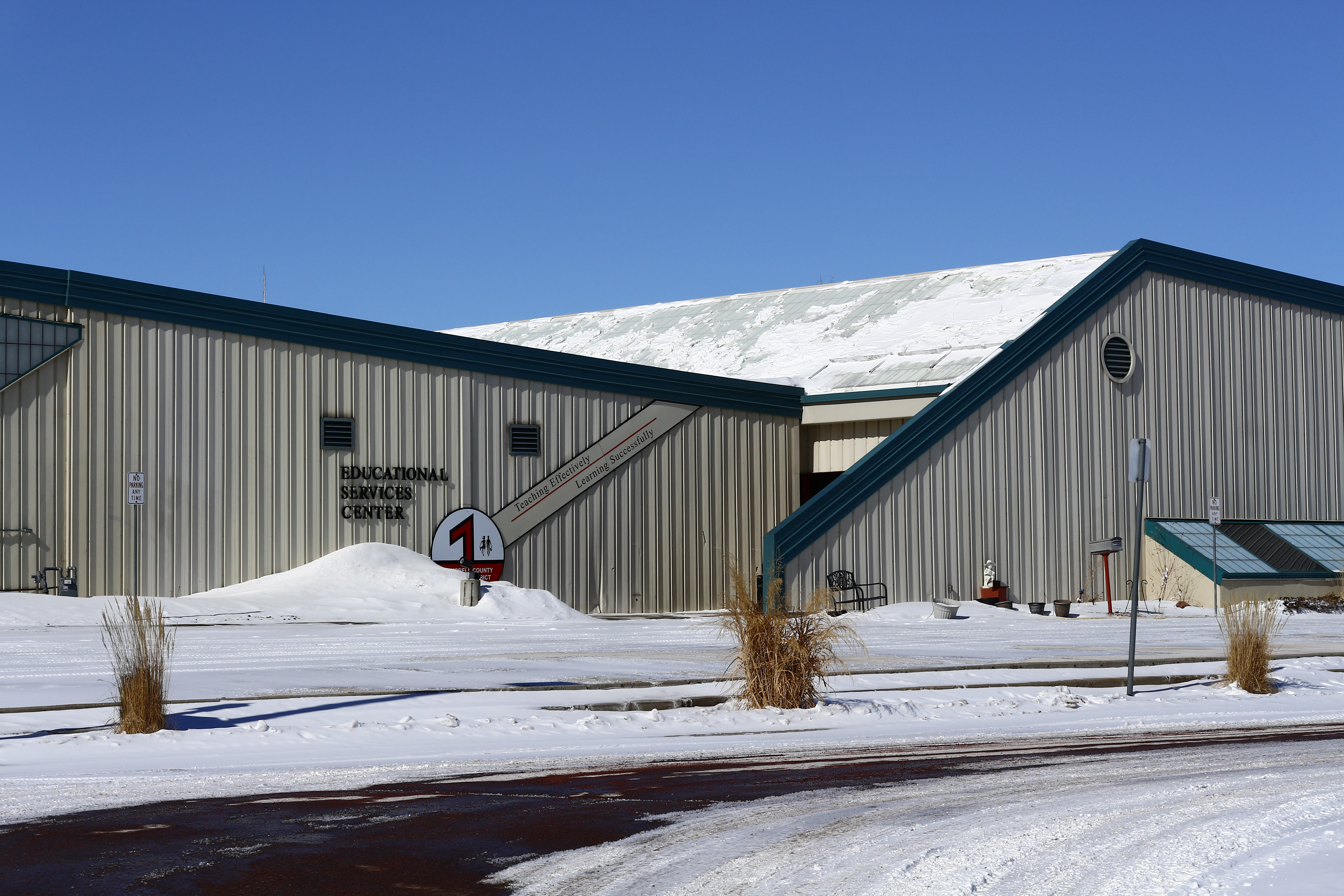
- Educational Services Center in Gillette
- Gillette, Wyoming, 82716

District information
- Motto: Teaching Effectively ..... Learning Successfully
- Superintendent: Alex Ayers

Students and staff
- Students: 8,721 (as of 2018-19)

Other information
- Website: www.ccsd.k12.wy.us

Campbell County School District #1 is a public school district based in Gillette, Wyoming, United States.

== Geography ==
Campbell County School District #1 serves all of Campbell County. The district covers a geographic area of about 4,802 square miles (12,436 km^{2}) and includes the following communities:

- Incorporated places
  - City of Gillette
  - Town of Wright
- Census-designated places (Note: All census-designated places are unincorporated.)
  - Sleepy Hollow
- Unincorporated places
  - Recluse
  - Rozet
  - Weston

== Schools ==
=== Secondary schools ===
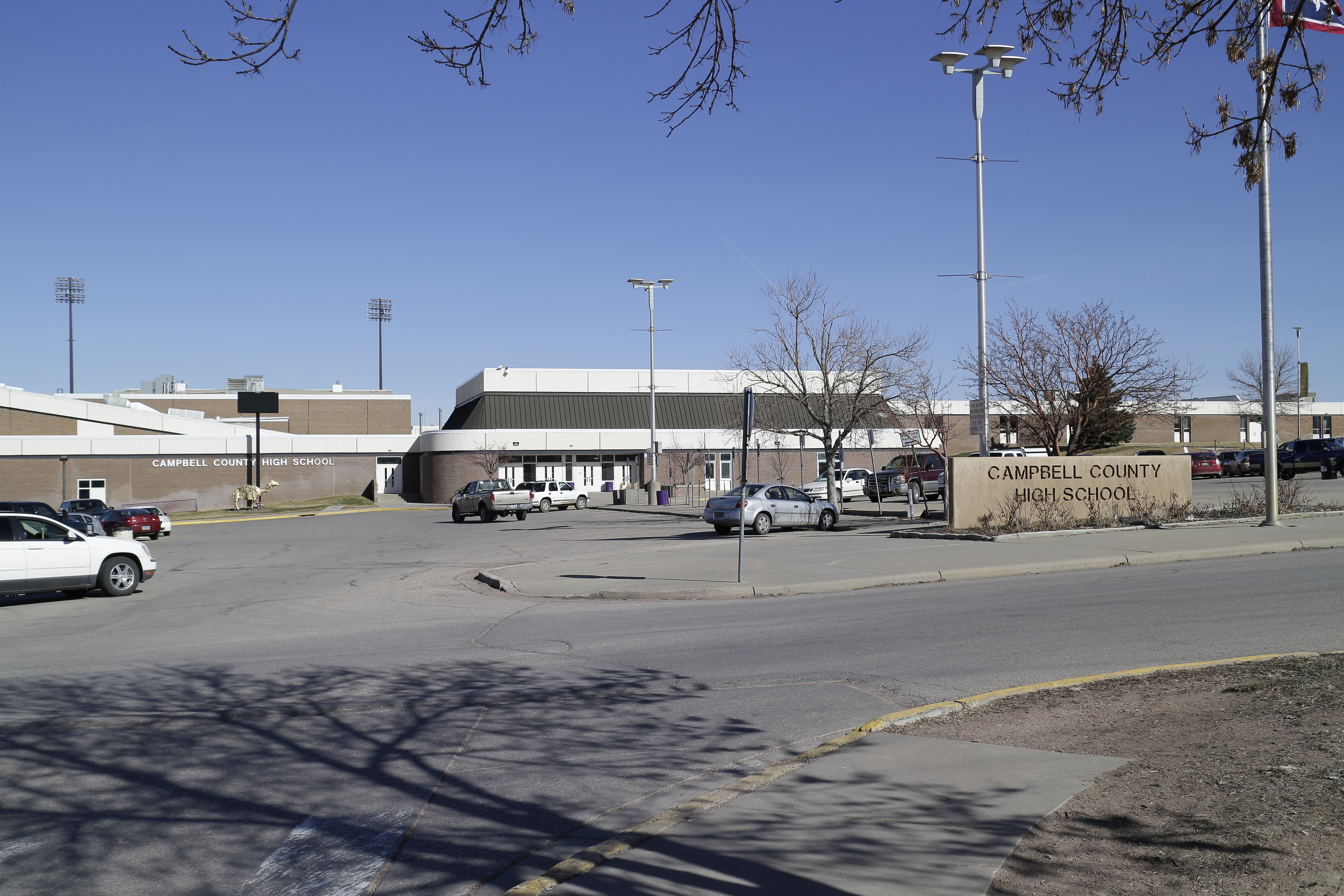
Campbell County High School in Gillette

==== High Schools ====
- Campbell County High School
- Thunder Basin High School
- Westwood High School (Alternative)

==== Jr/Sr High Schools ====
- Wright Junior/Senior High School (Grades 7-12)

==== Junior high schools ====
- Sage Valley Junior High School
- Twin Spruce Junior High School

=== Elementary schools ===
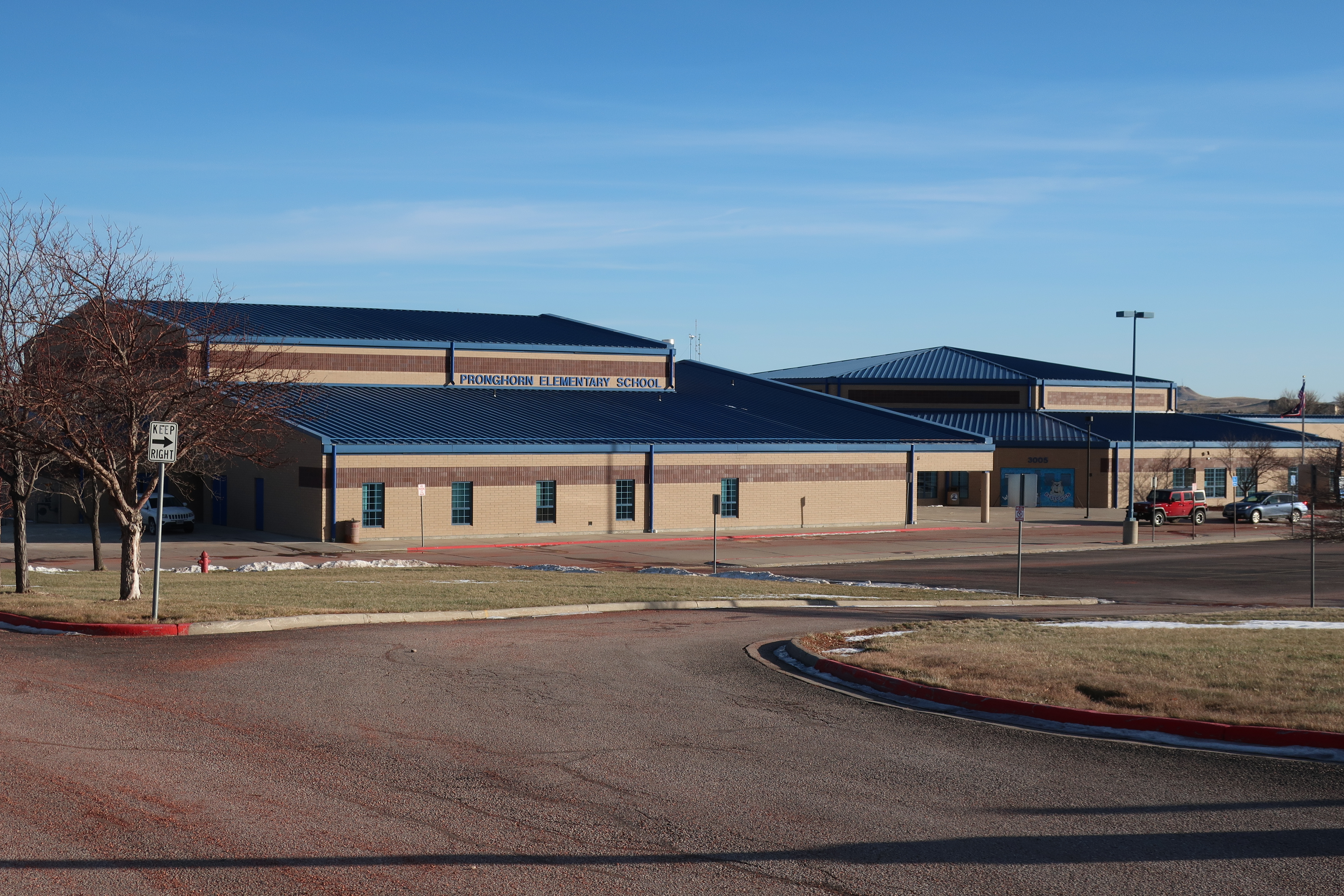
Pronghorn Elementary School in Gillette

- 4-J Elementary School
- Buffalo Ridge Elementary School
- Conestoga Elementary School
- Cottonwood Elementary School
- Hillcrest Elementary School
- Lakeview Elementary School
- Little Powder School
- Meadowlark Elementary School
- Paintbrush Elementary School
- Prairie Wind Elementary School
- Pronghorn Elementary School
- Rawhide Elementary School
- Recluse Elementary School
- Rozet Elementary School
- Stocktrail Elementary School
- Sunflower Elementary School
- Wagonwheel Elementary School

=== Virtual Schools ===
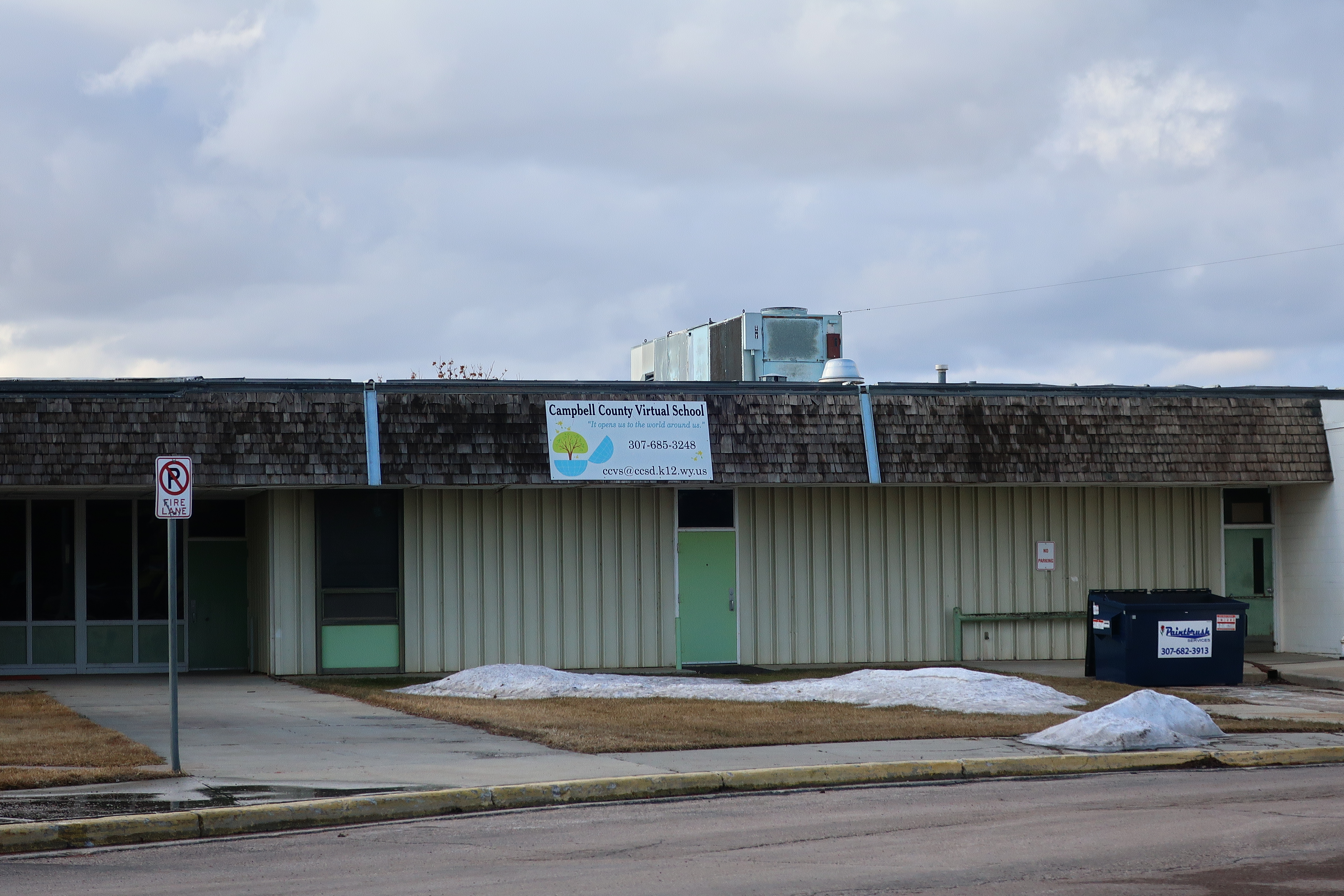
Campbell County Virtual School in Gillette

- Campbell County Virtual School

== Facilities ==
=== Libraries ===
The Campbell County School District libraries have 266,869 books with each school having an average 13,343 books. Checkouts by students numbered 330,000 in 2018 with an average 16,517 checkouts per school. On average the books were 17 years old.

== Administration ==
The superintendent as of 2019 is Alex Ayers, Ed.D. The school board consists of:

- Mrs. Toni Bell, Trustee
- Mrs. Linda Bricker, Trustee
- Dr. Ken Clouston, Trustee
- Mrs. Lisa Durgin, Vice-Chair
- Mr. David Foreman, Treasurer
- Dr. Joseph Lawrence, Clerk and Assistant Treasurer
- Mrs. Anne Ochs, Chair

== Student demographics ==
The following figures are as of October 1, 2009.

- Total District Enrollment: 8,214
- Student enrollment by gender
  - Male: 4,314 (52.52%)
  - Female: 3,900 (47.48%)
- Student enrollment by ethnicity
  - American Indian or Alaska Native: 124 (1.51%)
  - Asian: 68 (0.83%)
  - Black or African American: 70 (0.85%)
  - Hispanic or Latino: 693 (8.44%)
  - Native Hawaiian or Other Pacific Islander: 1 (0.01%)
  - White: 7,258 (88.36%)

== See also ==
- List of school districts in Wyoming
