= Big Muddy oil field =

Oil field in Wyoming, United States

Coordinates: 42°49′30″N 105°58′55″W

The Big Muddy oil field is an oil field in Converse County, Wyoming, between Casper and Glenrock.

== Discovery and exploitation ==
After a positive recommendation in 1913 from the U.S. Department of the Interior, a discovery well was drilled in 1916, probably by the Merritt Oil and Gas Company, yielding 26 barrels of oil per day. An oil boom ensued, with oil wasted into the North Platte River through poor preparation. The community of Parkerton was established at the field, with its own train station. The population peaked at 2500 in 1923, but Parkerton was mostly deserted by 1935.

The field produces from several strata in the Big Muddy Anticline, which covers about 9,000 acres (3,600 ha). The Wall Creek sands are the most productive deposit, averaging between 300 feet (91 m) and 3,500 feet (1,100 m) with an average thickness of 60 feet (18 m) to 70 feet (21 m), with 200 wells drilled by 1949. The Shannon oil stratum lies at an average depth of 1100 feet in a 30-foot (9.1 m) layer of sand. Of about 150 wells drilled in the Shannon deposit about 15 were dry. Peak production from the Shannon was 3,600,000 barrels in 1919. Later development took place in the Dakota sandstone at a depth between 4,200 feet (1,300 m) and 4,500 feet (1,400 m). 51 wells had been drilled in the Dakota deposit by 1949 with a production of 2,436,830 barrels of API 35 green oil. The Lakota and Stray sands were exploited in later years, with 1,367,316 barrels produced by 1949 from eleven wells. Since the Lakota wells produced large quantities of water, production concentrated on Dakota wells. The Big Muddy field produced little gas, although more gas came from the Wall Creek wells, and 549 million cubic feet of gas was produced in 1957, most of which was used locally in production work.

A refinery was built by the Mutual Oil Company in 1917 near Glenrock to process Big Muddy oil. Mutual was acquired by the Continental Oil Company in the mid-1920s with most of the field. The refinery closed by 1957. The refinery and another built by Standard Oil in Glenrock and others in Casper were connected to the field by pipelines. Some of the field's wells were developed on land owned by the University of Wyoming. The "University Well" supplemented the university's income in the 1920s and helped to pay for the Half Acre Gymnasium and the Aven Nelson Library.

By 1956, the field had produced 37.6 million barrels of oil. Water injection began in 1953 using water from Lakota wells, with 38 injection wells by 1958. It was ranked tenth of 170 fields in Wyoming in 1957.

== Later history ==
In 2007 8,500 acres (3,400 ha) of the field was purchased by Rancher Energy for $25 million. Production at the time was 60 barrels a day. In 2011 the field was purchased by Linc Energy. Link Energy's production has focused on gasification of strata to produce mainly gas from the field, using a coking process.
