= Weston, Wyoming =

- Unincorporated community
- Location within the state of Wyoming Weston (the United States)
- Coordinates: 44°38′13″N 105°20′10″W
- Country: United States
- State: Wyoming
- County: Campbell
- Elevation: 3,803 ft (1,159 m)
- Time zone: UTC-7 (Mountain (MST))
  - Summer (DST): UTC-6 (MDT)
- ZIP codes: 82731
- GNIS feature ID: 1604109

Weston is an unincorporated community in northern Campbell County, Wyoming, United States, along the upper Little Powder River on the southeastern edge of the Thunder Basin National Grassland. It lies along WYO 59 north of the city of Gillette, the county seat of Campbell County. Its elevation is 3,802 feet (1,159 m). Its post office has ZIP code of 82731.

== Education ==
Public education in the community of Weston is provided by Campbell County School District #1.
