= Converse County School District Number 1 =

Public school district in Wyoming, US

Converse County School District #1 is a public school district based in Douglas, Wyoming, United States.

== Geography ==
Converse County School District #1 serves the eastern portion of Converse County, including the following communities:

- Incorporated places
  - City of Douglas
  - Town of Lost Springs
- Census-designated places (Note: All census-designated places are unincorporated.)
  - Esterbrook
- Unincorporated places
  - Bill
  - Orin
  - Shawnee

== Schools ==
- Grades 9–12
  - Douglas High School
- Grades 6–8
  - Douglas Middle School
- Grades 4-5
  - Douglas Upper Elementary School
- Grades 2–3
  - Douglas Intermediate School
- Grades K–1
  - Douglas Primary School
- Grades K–8
  - Dry Creek Elementary School
  - Moss Agate Elementary School
  - Shawnee Elementary School
  - White Elementary School

== Student demographics ==
The following figures are as of October 1, 2009.

- Total District Enrollment: 1,677
- Student enrollment by gender
  - Male: 858 (51.16%)
  - Female: 819 (48.84%)
- Student enrollment by ethnicity
  - American Indian or Alaska Native: 11 (0.66%)
  - Asian: 7 (0.42%)
  - Black or African American: 11 (0.66%)
  - Hispanic or Latino: 118 (7.04%)
  - Native Hawaiian or Other Pacific Islander: 1 (0.06%)
  - Two or More Races: 4 (0.24%)
  - White: 1,525 (90.94%)

== See also ==
- List of school districts in Wyoming
