= Shawnee, Wyoming =

- Unincorporated community
- Location within the state of Wyoming
- Coordinates: 42°44′52″N 105°00′35″W
- Country: United States
- State: Wyoming
- County: Converse
- Elevation: 5,059 ft (1,542 m)
- Time zone: UTC-7 (Mountain (MST))
  - Summer (DST): UTC-6 (MDT)
- ZIP codes: 82229
- GNIS feature ID: 1594167

Shawnee is an unincorporated community in southeastern Converse County, Wyoming, United States. It lies along the concurrent U.S. Routes 18 and 20, east of the city of Douglas, the county seat of Converse County. Its elevation is 5,059 feet (1,542 m).

== History ==
A post office called Shawnee was established in 1887, and remained in operation until it closed in 2007. The community took its name from nearby Shawnee Creek.

== Education ==
Public education in the community of Shawnee is provided by Converse County School District #1. Zoned campuses include Shawnee School (grades K-8) and Douglas High School (grades 9–12).
