= Kelly Mader =

American politician (1952–2016)

Kelly Forbes Mader (February 12, 1952 – June 24, 2016) was an American politician.

Born in Sheridan, Wyoming, Mader was a rancher, auctioneer, and real estate broker with involvement in the coal industry. He lived in Campbell County, Wyoming. Mader served on the Wyoming House of Representatives in 1983 and 1984 and was a Republican. He then served in the Wyoming Senate from 1985 to 1991. He died at the age of 64 from a sudden heart attack at his home in College Station, Texas at age 64. His brother Troy Mader also served in the Wyoming Legislature.
