= Dull Center, Wyoming =

Dull Center
- Unincorporated community
- Location within the state of Wyoming
- Coordinates: 43°25′25″N 104°58′58″W
- Country: United States
- State: Wyoming
- County: Converse
- Elevation: 4,363 ft (1,330 m)
- Time zone: UTC-7 (Mountain (MST))
  - Summer (DST): UTC-6 (MST)

Dull Center is an unincorporated community located in Converse County, Wyoming, United States.

A post office called Dull Center was established in 1921, and remained in operation until 1954. Walter B. Dull, an early postmaster, gave the community his last name.
