= Spotted Horse =

Spotted Horse and Spotted Horses may refer to:

- Spotted Horse, Wyoming, an unincorporated community in Campbell County
- Spotted Horses, a novella written by William Faulkner

== See also ==
- Big Spotted Horse
- Leopard Spotted Horses
- List of horse breeds
- Spotted Saddle horse
