= Lost Springs =

Lost Springs may refer to:

== Places ==
United States

- Lost Springs, Kansas
- Lost Springs, Wyoming

== In entertainment ==
- Stolen Spring (film), 1993 Danish film sometimes referred to as The Lost Spring
- Lost Spring, a 1967 Japanese drama film
