= Dick Wallis =

American politician (1931–2022)

Member of the Wyoming House of Representatives
- In office 1980–1994
- Preceded by: Thomas I. Getter
- Succeeded by: George McMurtrey
- Constituency: Campbell County (1980-1993); 52nd district (1993-1994)

Personal details
- Born: Earl Richard Wallis; September 25, 1931 near Bosler, Wyoming, U.S.
- Died: September 27, 2022 (aged 91) El Paso, Texas, U.S.
- Party: Republican
- Occupation: rancher

Earl Richard Wallis (September 25, 1931 – September 27, 2022) was an American politician in the state of Wyoming. He served in the Wyoming House of Representatives as a member of the Republican Party. Initially, he represented Campbell County, but after Wyoming switched the state legislature from a county-based system to a district based system in 1992, he represented the 52nd district. He was initially appointed on January 30, 1980 to replace Thomas I. Getter, who had resigned.

He attended Colorado State University and the University of Wyoming and is a rancher. His daughter Sue Wallis also served in the Wyoming House of Representatives. Dick Wallis died in El Paso, Texas on September 27, 2022, two days after his 91st birthday.
