= Esterbrook, Wyoming =

- CDP
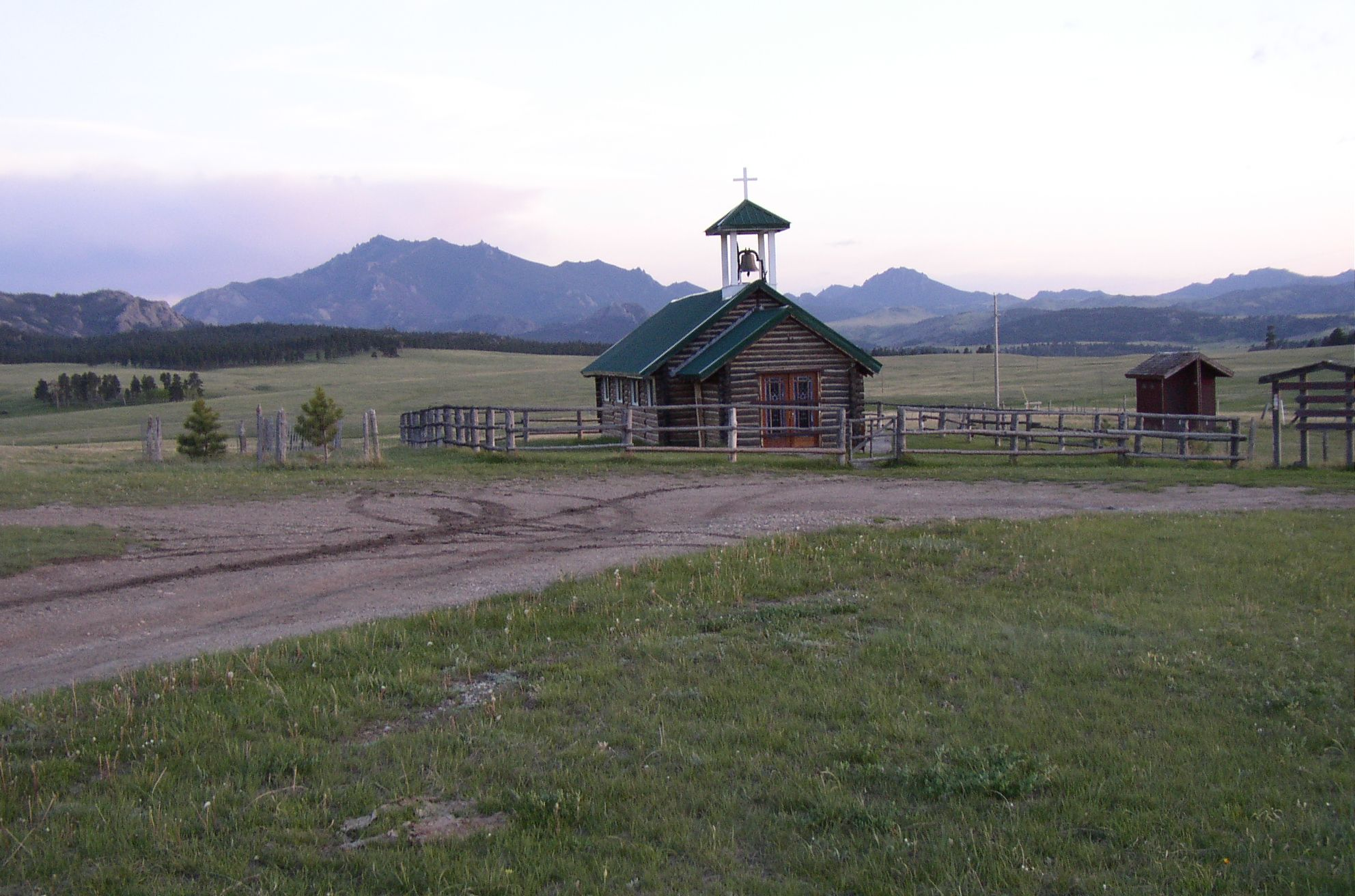
- Esterbrook Church and Laramie Peak in the background

- Location of Esterbrook, Wyoming
- Coordinates: 42°24′34″N 105°22′30″W
- Country: United States
- State: Wyoming
- County: Converse

Area
  - Total: 3.4 sq mi (8.8 km^{2})
  - Land: 3.4 sq mi (8.8 km^{2})
  - Water: 0 sq mi (0.0 km^{2})
- Elevation: 6,516 ft (1,986 m)

Population (2010)
  - Total: 52
  - Density: 15/sq mi (5.9/km^{2})
- Time zone: UTC-7 (Mountain (MST))
  - Summer (DST): UTC-6 (MDT)
- Area code: 307
- FIPS code: 56-25185
- GNIS feature ID: 2408091

Esterbrook is a village, and the locus of a same-named census-designated place (CDP), in Converse County, Wyoming, United States in the Medicine Bow National Forest. The population was 52 at the 2010 census.

== Geography ==
According to the United States Census Bureau, the CDP has a total area of 3.4 square miles (8.8 km^{2}), all land.

== Demographics ==
As of the census of 2000, there were 32 people, 16 households, and 12 families residing in the CDP. The population density was 9.4 people per square mile (3.6/km^{2}). There were 102 housing units at an average density of 30.1/sq mi (11.6/km^{2}). The racial makeup of the CDP was 100.00% White.

There were 16 households, out of which 6.3% had children under the age of 18 living with them, 75.0% were married couples living together, and 25.0% were non-families. 18.8% of all households were made up of individuals, and 6.3% had someone living alone who was 65 years of age or older. The average household size was 2.00 and the average family size was 2.25.

In the CDP, the population was spread out, with 9.4% under the age of 18, 6.3% from 18 to 24, 3.1% from 25 to 44, 50.0% from 45 to 64, and 31.3% who were 65 years of age or older. The median age was 57 years. For every 100 females, there were 88.2 males. For every 100 females age 18 and over, there were 107.1 males.

The median income for a household in the CDP was $33,750, and the median income for a family was $33,750. Males had a median income of $0 versus $0 for females. The per capita income for the CDP was $15,918. None of the population or families were below the poverty line.

== History ==
Esterbrook, founded in 1896 as a mining city, is named after Esterbrook Creek, which was named after Mrs. Esther Cooper, a local settler. In 1946 the Esterbrook Community Church (one of 29 mission churches in the Episcopal Missionary District of Wyoming) was built with a window behind the altar having a view to Laramie Peak.

== Education ==
Public education in the community of Esterbrook is provided by Converse County School District #1. Zoned campuses include White School (grades K-8) and Douglas High School (grades 9–12).

== See also ==
- Camp Esterbrook
- Laramie Peak
