= Ronda Boller =

American politician

Member of the Wyoming House of Representatives from the 52nd district
- member-elect
- Assumed office January 4, 2027
- Preceded by: Reuben Tarver

Personal details
- Party: Republican
- Website: Campaign website

Ronda Boller is an American politician. A member of the Republican Party, she is the member-elect of the Wyoming House of Representatives for the 52nd district. She was elected at the 2026 election. She is a fourth-generation native of Campbell County, Wyoming.
