= Pleasantdale =

Pleasantdale and Pleasant Dale can refer to:

- Rural Municipality of Pleasantdale No. 398, Saskatchewan, Canada
  - Pleasantdale, Saskatchewan

United States

- Pleasant Dale, Nebraska
- Pleasantdale, New Jersey
- Pleasant Dale, West Virginia
- Pleasantdale, Wyoming
