= Troy Mader =

American politician (1955–2016)

Member of the Wyoming House of Representatives from the 52nd district
- In office February 11, 2014 – January 5, 2015
- Preceded by: Sue Wallis
- Succeeded by: William Pownall

Personal details
- Born: December 1, 1955
- Died: July 14, 2016 (aged 60) Gillette, Wyoming, U.S.
- Party: Republican
- Spouse: Cindy Mader
- Children: 8
- Relatives: Kelly Mader (brother)
- Profession: Rancher, politician

Troy R. Mader (December 1, 1955 – July 14, 2016) was an American politician. A member of the Republican Party, he served in the Wyoming House of Representatives, representing the 52nd district. He succeeded Sue Wallis in February 2014 following her death.

== Career ==
Mader operated a ranch. He worked for the Abundant Wildlife Society of North America as a research director. In that role, he fought to prevent the restoration of the local wolf population by the federal government.

Under the name "T. R. Mader", he self-published a book on HIV/AIDS, titled The Death Sentence of AIDS, in 1987 in which he suggested the "quarantine" of infected people who continue to have sex. Receiving criticism of standing by the book, Mader stated in 2014 "I believe tolerance is characteristic of a person who hasn’t any virtue left." He also stated that "many gay people demand the right to have sex with children."

Mader also served as a precinct captain for the Campbell County Republican Party. Following the January 2014 death of Sue Wallis, who served the northern half of Campbell County in the Wyoming House of Representatives, Mader put his name forward as a potential replacement. The Campbell County Republican Party included Mader on their list of three finalists, which they forwarded to the Campbell County Commission, who voted to appoint Mader to serve the remainder of her term in February. He was sworn into the state House on February 11, 2014. He served on the House Revenue Committee and the House Corporations, Elections and Political Subdivisions Committee.

== Personal life ==
Mader was from Gillette, Wyoming. He and his wife had eight children. His brother, Kelly Mader, was a former member of both chambers of the Wyoming Legislature who preceded him in death on June 24, 2016, due to a heart attack.

Mader played guitar and wrote country music under the name "T. R. Mader".

Mader died in an ATV accident while herding cattle on July 14, 2016. He was 60.
