= Wyoming's 52nd House of Representatives district =

American legislative district

Wyoming's 52nd State House of Representatives district
- Wyoming's 52nd House of Representatives district as of 2022
Representative
Reuben Tarver; R–Gillette
- Demographics: 85% White; 10% Hispanic; 1% Native American; 4% Multiracial
- Population (2022): 10,804

Wyoming's 52nd House of Representatives district is one of 62 districts in the Wyoming House of Representatives. The district encompasses part of Campbell County. It is represented by Republican Representative Reuben Tarver of Gillette.

In 1992, the state of Wyoming switched from electing state legislators by county to a district-based system.

== List of members representing the district ==
Representative	Party	Term	Note
Dick Wallis	Republican	1993 – 1995	Elected in 1992.
George McMurtrey	Republican	1995 – 2005	Elected in 1994. Re-elected in 1996. Re-elected in 1998. Re-elected in 2000. Re-elected in 2002.
Burke Jackson	Republican	2005 – 2007	Elected in 2004.
Sue Wallis	Republican	2007 – 2014	Elected in 2006. Re-elected in 2008. Re-elected in 2010. Re-elected in 2012. Died in 2014.
Troy Mader	Republican	2014 – 2015	Appointed in 2014.
William Pownall	Republican	2015 – 2021	Elected in 2014. Re-elected in 2016. Re-elected in 2018.
Bill Fortner	Republican	2021 – 2023	Elected in 2020.
Reuben Tarver	Republican	2023 – present	Elected in 2022. Re-elected in 2024.
Ronda Boller	Republican	2027 – member-elect	Elected in 2026.

== Recent election results ==
=== 2014 ===
House district 52 general election
Party	Candidate	Votes	%
Republican	William Pownall	1,724	96.20%
Write-ins		68	3.79%
Total votes		1,792	100.0%
Invalid or blank votes		274	
Republican hold			

=== 2016 ===
House district 52 general election
Party	Candidate	Votes	%
Republican	William Pownall (incumbent)	2,696	79.81%
Democratic	Duffy Jenniges	633	18.73%
Write-ins		49	1.45%
Total votes		3,378	100.0%
Invalid or blank votes		249	
Republican hold			

=== 2018 ===
House district 52 general election
Party	Candidate	Votes	%
Republican	William Pownall (incumbent)	2,060	95.99%
Write-ins		86	4.00%
Total votes		2,146	100.0%
Invalid or blank votes		417	
Republican hold			

=== 2020 ===
House district 52 general election
Party	Candidate	Votes	%
Republican	Bill Fortner	3,368	97.34%
Write-ins		92	2.65%
Total votes		3,460	100.0%
Invalid or blank votes		439	
Republican hold			

=== 2022 ===
House district 52 general election
Party	Candidate	Votes	%
Republican	Reuben Tarver	2,307	98.42%
Write-ins		37	1.57%
Total votes		2,344	100.0%
Invalid or blank votes		288	
Republican hold			

=== 2024 ===
House district 52 general election
Party	Candidate	Votes	%
Republican	Reuben Tarver (incumbent)	3,402	98.78%
Write-ins		42	1.21%
Total votes		3,444	100.0%
Invalid or blank votes		392	
Republican hold			

== Historical district boundaries ==
Map	Description	Apportionment Plan	Notes
	Campbell County (part)	1992 Apportionment Plan	
	Campbell County (part)	2002 Apportionment Plan	
	Campbell County (part)	2012 Apportionment Plan	
