= Burke Jackson =

American politician (born 1949)

Member of the Wyoming House of Representatives from the 52nd district
- In office 2004–2006
- Succeeded by: Sue Wallis

Personal details
- Born: December 14, 1949 (age 76) Gillette, Wyoming, U.S.
- Party: Republican
- Spouse: Evelyn
- Children: 2
- Education: Campbell County High School; Casper College
- Occupation: Politician, rancher

Burke Jackson (born December 14, 1949) is an American politician and rancher from Gillette, Wyoming, who served in the Wyoming House of Representatives, representing the 52nd district of Wyoming from 2004 to 2006 (Note: According to the Wyoming Legislature, Jackson served from 2005 to 2006.) as a Republican.

== Early life and education ==
Jackson was born in Gillette, Wyoming, on December 14, 1949. He attended Campbell County High School and Casper College, graduating from the former with a degree.

== Career ==
Jackson served in the Wyoming House of Representatives from 2004 until 2006, representing the 52nd legislative district of Wyoming as a Republican. During his time in office, Jackson served on the Select Committee on Legislative Facilities and the Education Commission of the States, in addition to the following standing committees:

- Agriculture, State and Public Lands and Water Resources
- Labor, Health and Social Services

Jackson was succeeded in office by Republican Sue Wallis, also from Gillette.

Outside of politics, Jackson is a rancher.

== Political positions ==
Jackson received a 100% rating from the Wyoming Prosperity Project in 2016.

== Personal life ==
Jackson is a Protestant. He has a wife and two children.

== Notes ==
Wyoming House of Representatives
Preceded by —	Member of the Wyoming House of Representatives from the 52nd district 2004–2006	Succeeded by Sue Wallis
