= Sleepy Hollow, Wyoming =

- Census-designated place
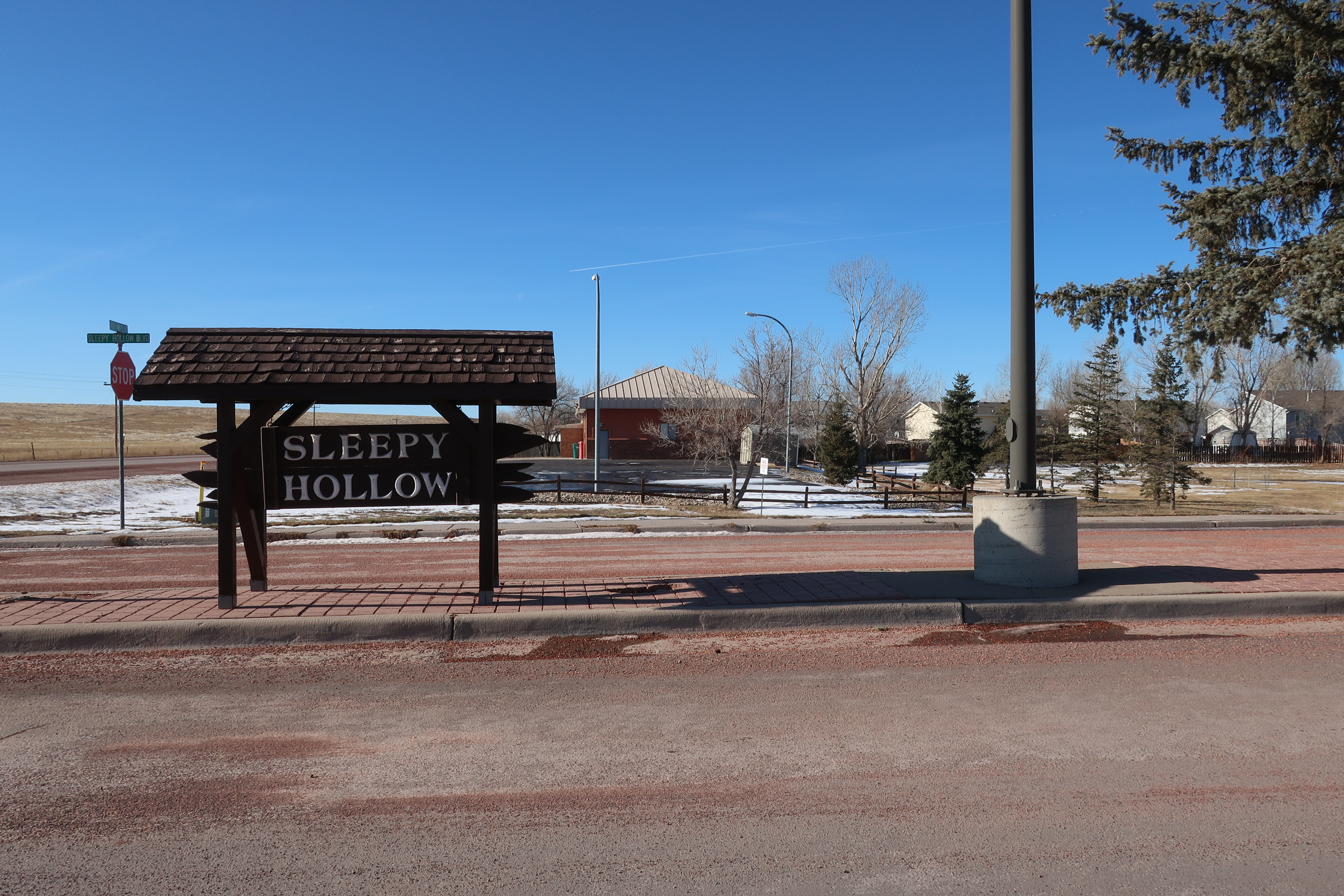
- Sleepy Hollow entrance in Campbell County

- Location in Campbell County, Wyoming and the state of Wyoming
- Coordinates: 44°13′58″N 105°25′51″W
- Country: United States
- State: Wyoming
- County: Campbell

Area
  - Total: 0.42 sq mi (1.08 km^{2})
  - Land: 0.42 sq mi (1.08 km^{2})
  - Water: 0 sq mi (0.0 km^{2})
- Elevation: 4,561 ft (1,390 m)

Population (2010)
  - Total: 1,308
  - Density: 3,140/sq mi (1,210/km^{2})
- Time zone: UTC-7 (Mountain (MST))
  - Summer (DST): UTC-6 (MDT)
- Area code: 307
- FIPS code: 56-71350
- GNIS feature ID: 2408747

Sleepy Hollow is a census-designated place (CDP) in Campbell County, Wyoming, United States. The population was 1,308 at the 2010 census.

== Geography ==
According to the United States Census Bureau, the CDP has a total area of 0.4 square miles (1.1 km^{2}), all land.

== Demographics ==
As of the census of 2000, there were 1,177 people, 361 households, and 322 families residing in the CDP. The population density was 3,767.7 people per square mile (1,465.9/km^{2}). There were 368 housing units at an average density of 1,178.0/sq mi (458.3/km^{2}). The racial makeup of the CDP was 95.41% White, 0.08% African American, 1.27% Native American, 1.02% Asian, 0.42% Pacific Islander, 1.61% from other races, and 0.17% from two or more races. Hispanic or Latino of any race were 4.50% of the population.

There were 361 households, out of which 63.4% had children under the age of 18 living with them, 78.4% were married couples living together, 5.8% had a female householder with no husband present, and 10.8% were non-families. 7.5% of all households were made up of individuals, and 1.1% had someone living alone who was 65 years of age or older. The average household size was 3.26 and the average family size was 3.42.

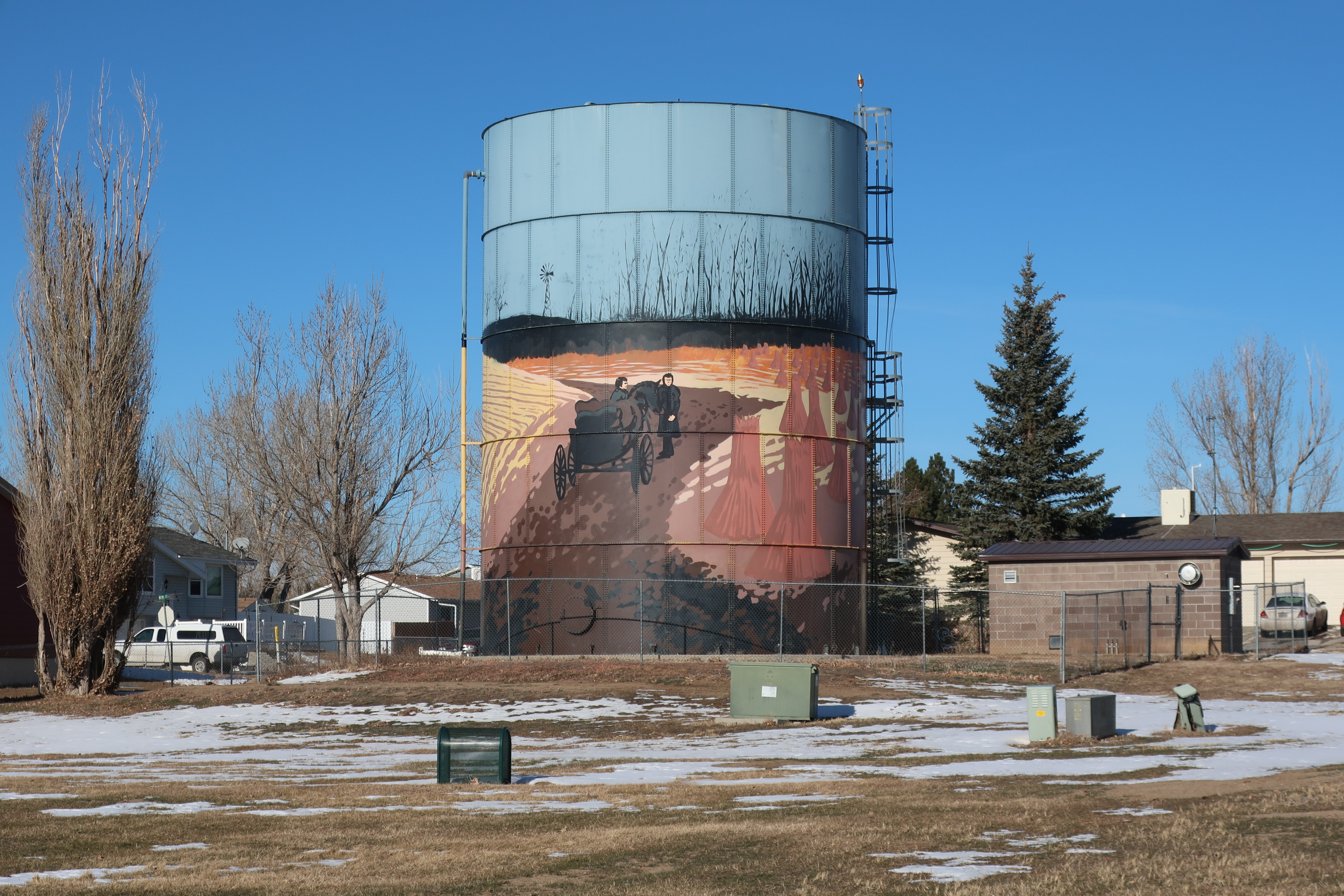
Water tower in Sleepy Hollow painted with a mural based on The Legend of Sleepy Hollow

In the CDP, the population was spread out, with 37.6% under the age of 18, 6.5% from 18 to 24, 39.8% from 25 to 44, 15.1% from 45 to 64, and 1.0% who were 65 years of age or older. The median age was 29 years. For every 100 females, there were 100.9 males. For every 100 females age 18 and over, there were 101.4 males.

The median income for a household in the CDP was $62,750, and the median income for a family was $70,441. Males had a median income of $52,679 versus $19,479 for females. The per capita income for the CDP was $20,781. About 2.5% of families and 2.7% of the population were below the poverty line, including 3.9% of those under age 18 and 35.0% of those age 65 or over.

== Education ==
Public education in the community of Sleepy Hollow is provided by Campbell County School District #1.
