= Bill Fortner =

American politician

Member of the Wyoming House of Representatives from the 52nd district
- In office January 4, 2021 – January 2023
- Preceded by: William Pownall
- Succeeded by: Reuben Tarver

Personal details
- Born: Gillette, Wyoming, U.S.
- Party: Republican
- Education: Gillette College Technical Education Center

Bill Fortner is an American politician and union welder who served as a member of the Wyoming House of Representatives from the 52nd district. Elected in November 2020, he assumed office on January 4, 2021. He was defeated in the primary during his attempt at re-election in 2022.

== Early life and education ==
Fortner was born and raised in Gillette, Wyoming. He attended the Gillette College Technical Education Center and was trained as a welder.

== Career ==
Fortner was elected to the Wyoming House of Representatives in November 2020 after defeating incumbent William Pownall in the August 2020 Republican primary. Fortner is a member of the Agriculture, State and Public Lands & Water Resources Committee.
