= Echeta, Wyoming =

Echeta
- Unincorporated community
- Location within the state of Wyoming Echeta (the United States)
- Coordinates: 44°27′24″N 105°52′30″W
- Country: United States
- State: Wyoming
- County: Campbell,
- Elevation: 4,065 ft (1,239 m)
- Time zone: UTC-7 (Mountain (MST))
  - Summer (DST): UTC-6 (MDT)
- ZIP codes: 82718
- Area code: 307
- GNIS feature ID: 1597304

Echeta is an unincorporated community in Campbell County in the U.S. state of Wyoming. The community is approximately 22 miles northwest of Gillette.
