= Bill, Wyoming =

- Unincorporated community
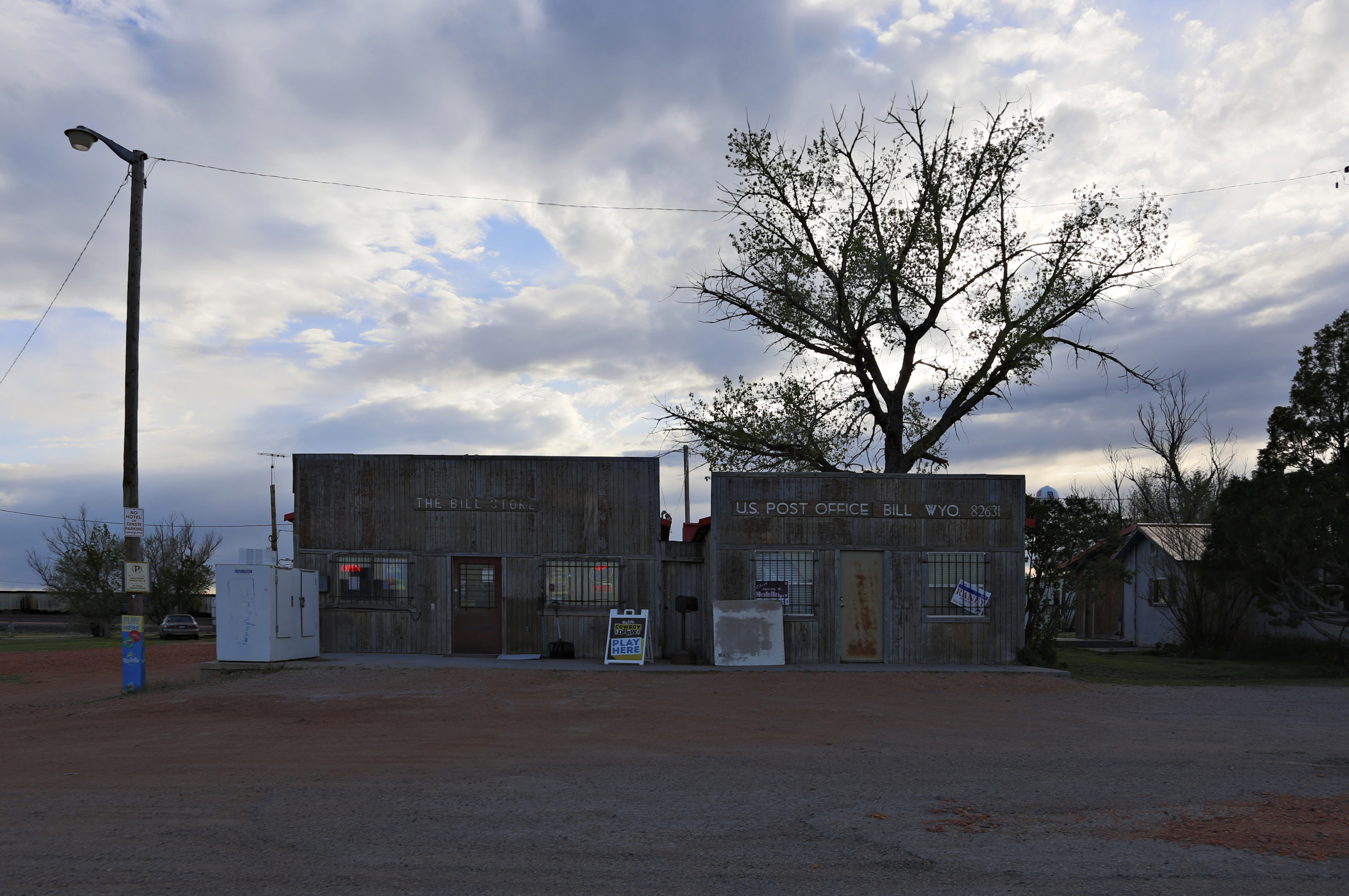
- Post office and store in the town

- Location within the state of Wyoming
- Coordinates: 43°13′55″N 105°15′37″W
- Country: United States
- State: Wyoming
- County: Converse
- Time zone: UTC-7 (Mountain (MST))
  - Summer (DST): UTC-6 (MDT)
- ZIP codes: 82631
- GNIS feature ID: 1598180

Bill is an unincorporated community in Converse County, Wyoming, United States. It is included within the southern-central portion of Thunder Basin National Grassland.

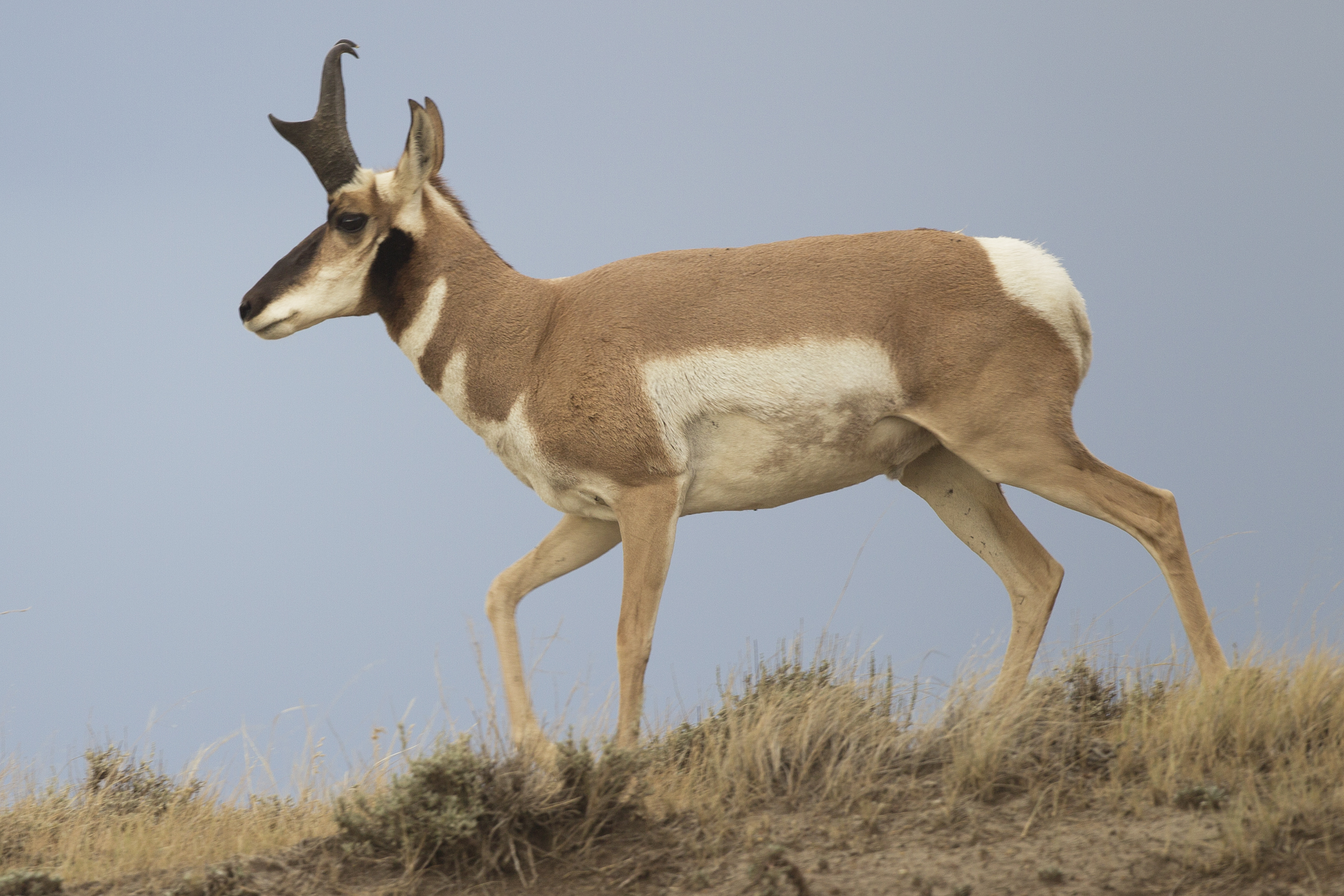
Pronghorn Antelope

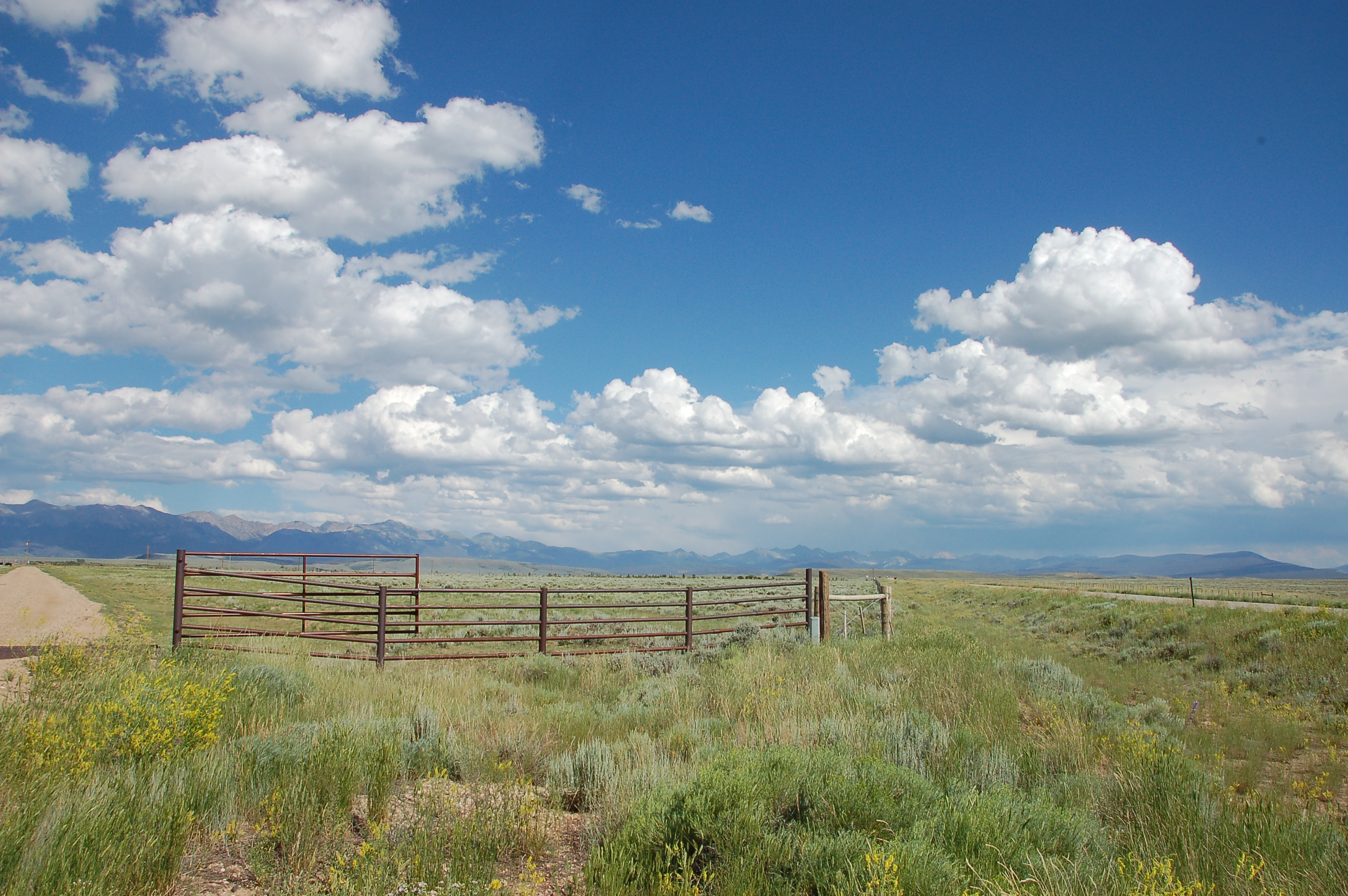
Thunder Basin National Grassland near Bill, Wyoming

== History ==
The settlement is rumored to have begun shortly after World War I, when a doctor moved there. It was called "Bill" by the doctor's wife due to a number of men in the area with that name. Before long, Bill had a post office and small store selling sandwiches to truckers and a country school for children from surrounding ranches. The owner of the store even established the "Bill Yacht Club" which had no boats, no water, and no costly boating accidents but sold hats and T-shirts to tourists who felt they were in on the joke.

After World War II, the town's population began to decrease and, by the 1970s, Bill was reduced to just the small store and adjacent residence. Then, in the early 1980s, the Chicago and North Western Railway, which ran past Bill, decided to develop a stop at Bill for resting and changing crews. They built a small rail yard and the town thereafter redeveloped. The new development more than doubled Bill's population from 5 (including pets) to 11 people in just two years.

By 2008, it had been developed much further to include a 112-room hotel and a 24-hour diner (both open to everyone but catering especially to railroaders). Also the post office and elementary school were restored, and a community center was opened. The hotel serves railroad employees as a crew-change station on the coal line running south through the area from Wyoming's Powder River Basin coal mines. Railroad conductors, engineers, and other employees are required to stop and take mandatory rests in Bill.

== Climate ==
According to the Köppen Climate Classification system, Bill has a semi-arid climate, abbreviated "BSk" on climate maps.

== Education ==
- Dry Creek Elementary School

== Highways ==
- WYO 59

- Wyoming State Hwy 59 is a north-south highway passing through Bill and through Thunder Basin Nat'l. Grassland. Interstate 25 intersects with WY-59, 35 miles south of Bill in Douglas.
