= Reuben Tarver =

American politician

Member of the Wyoming House of Representatives from the 52nd district
- Incumbent
- Assumed office January 2, 2023
- Preceded by: Bill Fortner
- Succeeded by: Ronda Boller (elect)

Personal details
- Party: Republican

Reuben Tarver is an American politician. He serves as a Republican member for the 52nd district of the Wyoming House of Representatives.
