= Spotted Horse, Wyoming =

- Unincorporated community
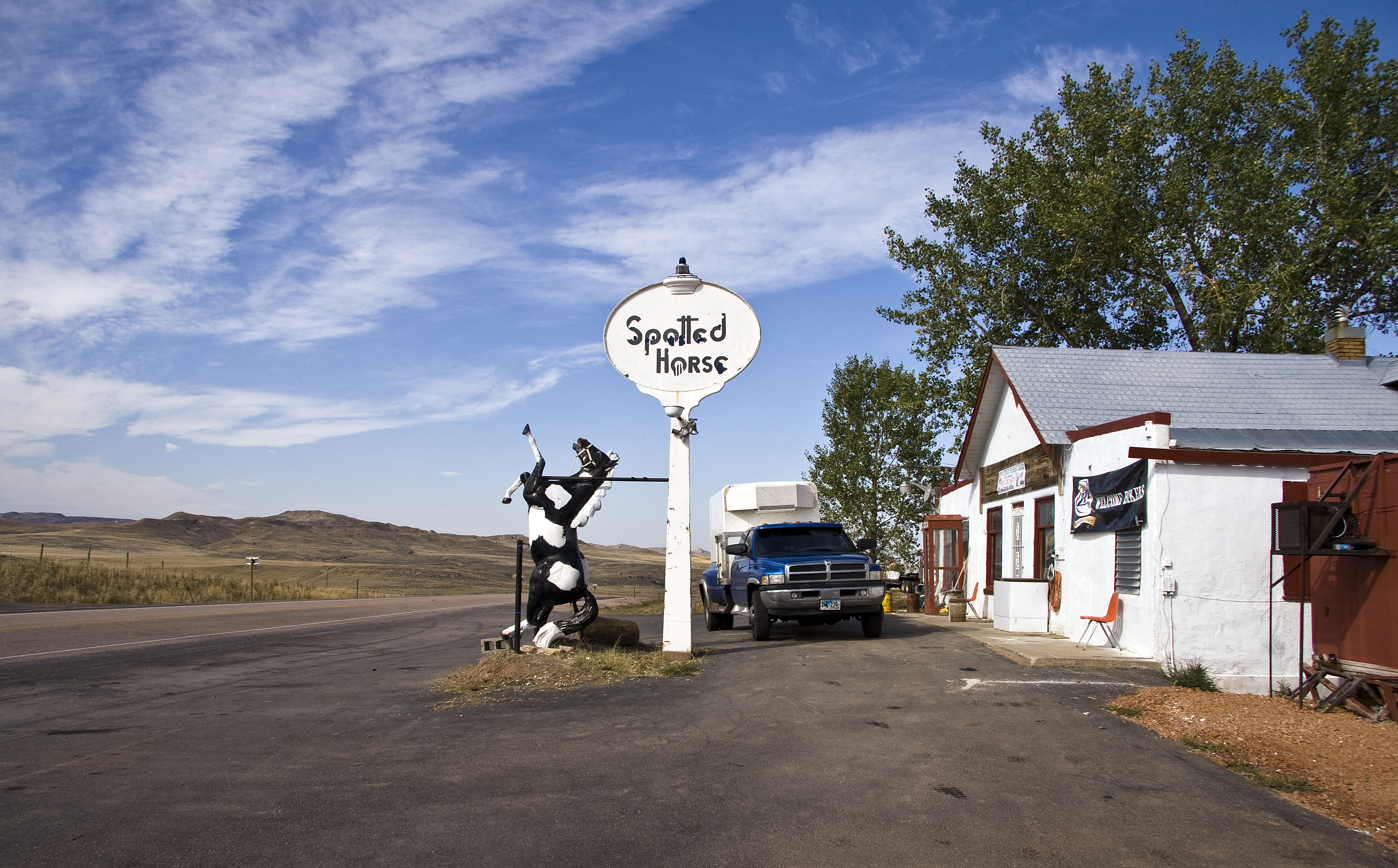
- Central Spotted Horse

- Location within the state of Wyoming Spotted Horse (the United States)
- Coordinates: 44°42′30″N 105°50′6″W
- Country: United States
- State: Wyoming
- County: Campbell
- Elevation: 4,026 ft (1,227 m)
- Time zone: UTC-7 (Mountain (MST))
  - Summer (DST): UTC-6 (MST)
- GNIS feature ID: 1597506

Spotted Horse is an unincorporated community in Campbell County, Wyoming, United States. Its current population is two. The town is on U.S. routes 14/16, at the head of Spotted Horse Creek, a tributary of the Powder River. The undeveloped Spotted Horse coalfield is north of town.

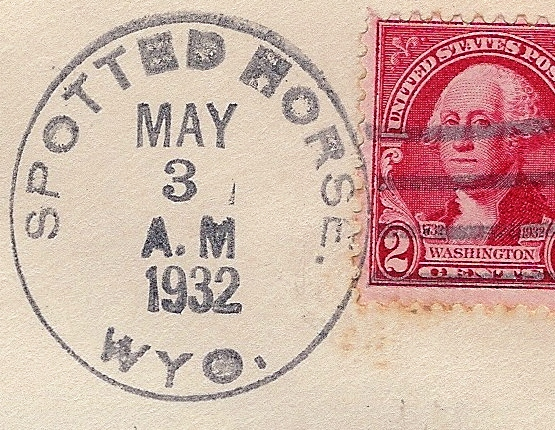

The town was named after a Native American. Its post office closed in 1964.

== History ==
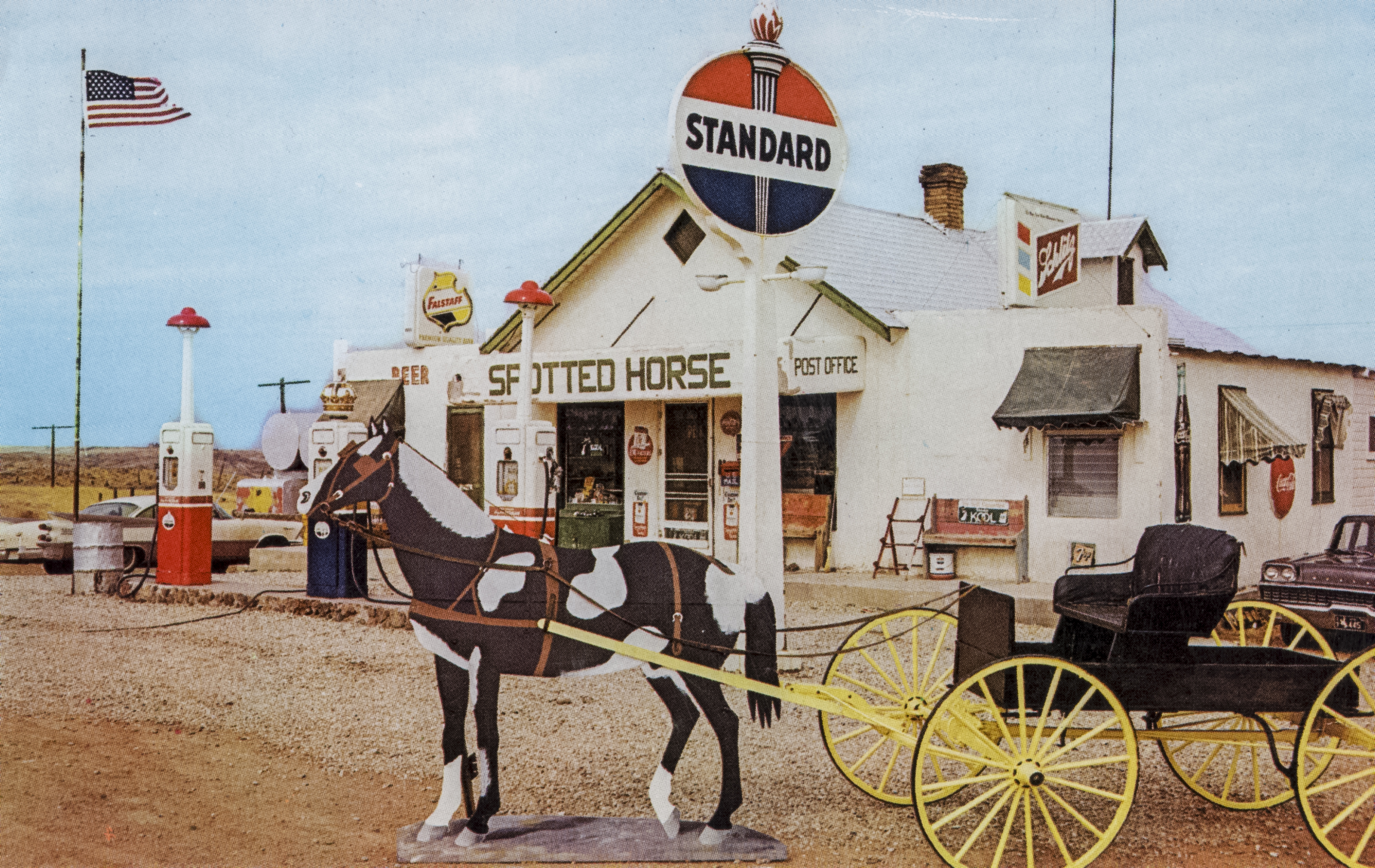
The Spotted Horse store circa 1960

The Astorian expedition camped near the future Spotted Horse townsite in 1811.

A small community lived at the site in the 19th century. By about 1900 Solon and George Walker established a general store and post office. A.L. Pringle established the present bar as a store and gas station in the early 1920s. A school was established in the 1920s. A dance hall was destroyed in a 1944 tornado.
