= Parkerton, Wyoming =

Coordinates: 42°51′04″N 105°58′23″W

Parkerton, Wyoming is an unincorporated community in Converse County, Wyoming, United States. It is in the Mountain Standard Time Zone. Elevation is 5,030 feet.

== Geography ==
Parkerton is located in Converse County between Meadow Acres, Wyoming and the town of Glenrock on U.S. Highway 26 and borders the North Platte River.

== History ==
Parkerton is a community that borders a large industrial area in Central Wyoming.

Parkerton is one of many places in Central Wyoming that started to see more significant growth after the year 1889 when several industries became established near Parkerton, Glenrock, and Evansville.

Parkerton has also been known as Parkerton Station from when it was known as one of the many railroad stops that were established in the early years of railroad expansion in the United States.

The original Post Office in Parkerton is no longer in service.

A Post Office that serves the community is in Glenrock.
