= Lost Springs, Wyoming =

- Town
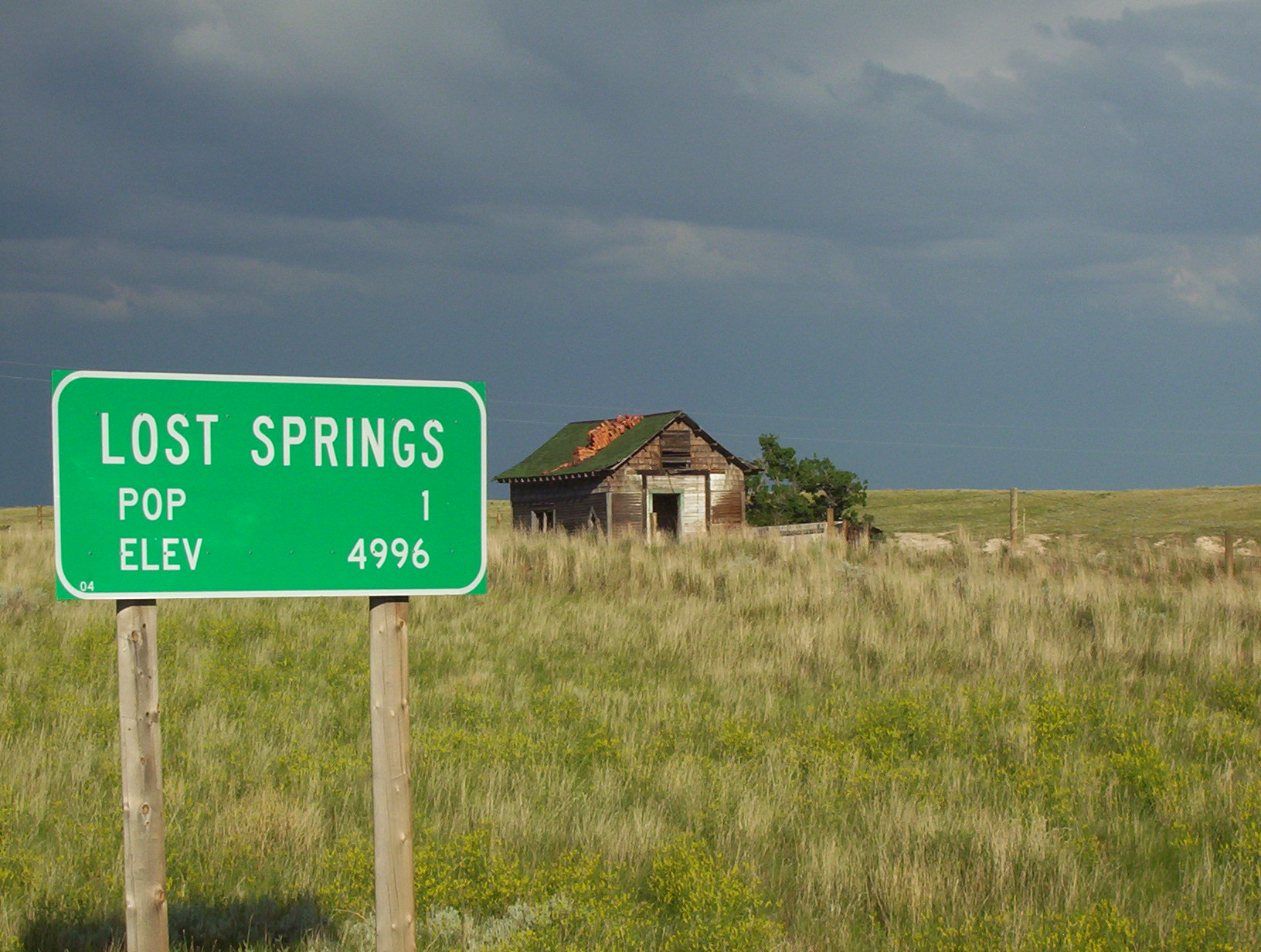
- Road Sign in Lost Springs, 2007

- Location of Lost Springs in Converse County, Wyoming
- Coordinates: 42°45′55″N 104°55′32″W
- Country: United States
- State: Wyoming
- County: Converse
- Year of incorporation: 1911

Area
  - Total: 0.089 sq mi (0.23 km^{2})
  - Land: 0.089 sq mi (0.23 km^{2})
  - Water: 0 sq mi (0.00 km^{2})
- Elevation: 4,997 ft (1,523 m)

Population (2020)
  - Total: 6
  - Density: 44.5/sq mi (17.18/km^{2})
- Time zone: UTC-7 (Mountain (MST))
  - Summer (DST): UTC-6 (MDT)
- ZIP code: 82224
- Area code: 307
- FIPS code: 56-47805
- GNIS feature ID: 2412919

Lost Springs is a town in Converse County, Wyoming, United States. As of the 2020 census, the population was 6, making it the least populated municipality in Wyoming.

== History ==
Lost Springs was first inhabited in the 1880s, when it received its name from railroad workers who could not find the springs shown on survey maps of the area. The town was incorporated in 1911, and it originally had 200 residents, most of whom worked at the nearby Rosin coal mine. After the coal mine closed around 1930, the population of Lost Springs steadily declined.

Edward John Sanmann of York, Nebraska, and his wife, Lauretta Mae (Rogers) of Bloomington, Nebraska, moved to Lost Springs in 1948 where they lived and worked in the general store and assisted with running the town's post office. Sanmann was a member of the American Sunday School Union and Bible Class at Shawnee. The couple had a daughter who died in infancy, Virginia Arlene, and an adopted daughter, Louise Marie. Sanmann and his wife died 17 days apart in September 1967.

By 1960, the population of the town had dropped to five. In 1976, both the state of Wyoming and the U.S. Bicentennial Commission designated Lost Springs as the smallest incorporated town in America; its population was then eleven.

In 1983, Lost Springs became involved in a court battle with the Chicago and North Western Transportation Company. The railroad, which ran adjacent to the town, attempted to seize 5.2 acres (2.1 ha) of land to build a 22-foot (6.7 m) railway embankment. Lost Springs Mayor Leda Price alleged that the embankment, which would lie between the town and U.S. Highways 18 and 20, would separate the town from traffic on the highway. A Wyoming district judge ruled in the town's favor, and the railroad ultimately agreed to build an unobstructing track bed and use its own land for track.

== Geography ==
Lost Springs is located on the High Plains. According to the United States Census Bureau, the town has a total area of 0.09 square miles (0.23 km^{2}), all land.

=== Climate ===
Lost Springs has a semi-arid climate under the Köppen Climate Classification. The town experiences cold, dry winters and warm, slightly wet summers.

Climate data for Lost Springs, Wyoming
Month	Jan	Feb	Mar	Apr	May	Jun	Jul	Aug	Sep	Oct	Nov	Dec	Year
Mean daily maximum °F (°C)	34 (1)	39 (4)	47 (8)	56 (13)	66 (19)	78 (26)	86 (30)	85 (29)	75 (24)	62 (17)	44 (7)	36 (2)	59 (15)
Mean daily minimum °F (°C)	11 (−12)	16 (−9)	22 (−6)	29 (−2)	38 (3)	47 (8)	53 (12)	52 (11)	43 (6)	32 (0)	20 (−7)	13 (−11)	31 (−1)
Average precipitation inches (mm)	0.50 (13)	0.46 (12)	0.76 (19)	1.69 (43)	2.09 (53)	1.78 (45)	1.89 (48)	1.02 (26)	1.24 (31)	1.10 (28)	0.62 (16)	0.45 (11)	13.6 (345)
Source: The Weather Channel

== Demographics ==
Historical population
Census	Pop.	Note	%±
1910	207		—
1920	121		−41.5%
1930	66		−45.5%
1940	38		−42.4%
1950	9		−76.3%
1960	5		−44.4%
1970	7		40.0%
1980	9		28.6%
1990	4		−55.6%
2000	1		−75.0%
2010	4		300.0%
2020	6		50.0%
U.S. Decennial Census

=== 2010 census ===
As of the census of 2010, there were 4 people, 3 households, and 0 families residing in the town. The population density was 44.4 inhabitants per square mile (17.1/km^{2}). There were 3 housing units at an average density of 33.3 per square mile (12.9/km^{2}). The racial makeup of the town was 100.0% White.

There were 3 households, of which 100.0% were non-families. 66.7% of all households were made up of individuals. The average household size was 1.33.

The median age in the town was 59.5 years. 100% of residents were between the ages of 45 and 64. The gender makeup of the town was 50.0% male and 50.0% female.

=== 2000 census ===
For the 2000 census, only one person resided in Lost Springs, Wyoming. According to the United States Census Bureau, the town is one of only four places in the United States to have a population of one person. Since 2000, the population of Monowi, Nebraska, also fell to one. However, Lost Springs mayor Leda Price claims the census was inaccurate and that Lost Springs had four residents in 2000. By 2009, the population had dropped to three. According to the 2010 census, the population was four.

== Education ==
Lost Springs is included within Converse County School District Number 1.
