= Pleasantdale, Wyoming =

- Unincorporated community
- Location within Wyoming
- Coordinates: 44°04′34″N 105°43′10″W
- Country: United States
- State: Wyoming
- County: Campbell

Area
  - Total: 0.29 sq mi (0.75 km^{2})
  - Land: 0.29 sq mi (0.75 km^{2})
  - Water: 0 sq mi (0 km^{2})
- Elevation: 4,944 ft (1,507 m)

Population (2015)
  - Total: 12
  - Density: 31/sq mi (12/km^{2})
- Time zone: UTC-7 (Mountain (MST))
  - Summer (DST): UTC-6 (MDT)
- Area code: 307
- GNIS feature ID: 1597460

Pleasantdale is an unincorporated community in Campbell County, Wyoming, United States. Pleasantdale is located on Wyoming Highway 50, 18 miles (29 km) southwest of Gillette.

== Etymology ==
The name "Pleasantdale" is thought to be a spin-off of the nearby and older town of "Savageton" to make the town sound more attractive than its neighbor.
