= Converse County, Wyoming =

County in Wyoming, United States

- County
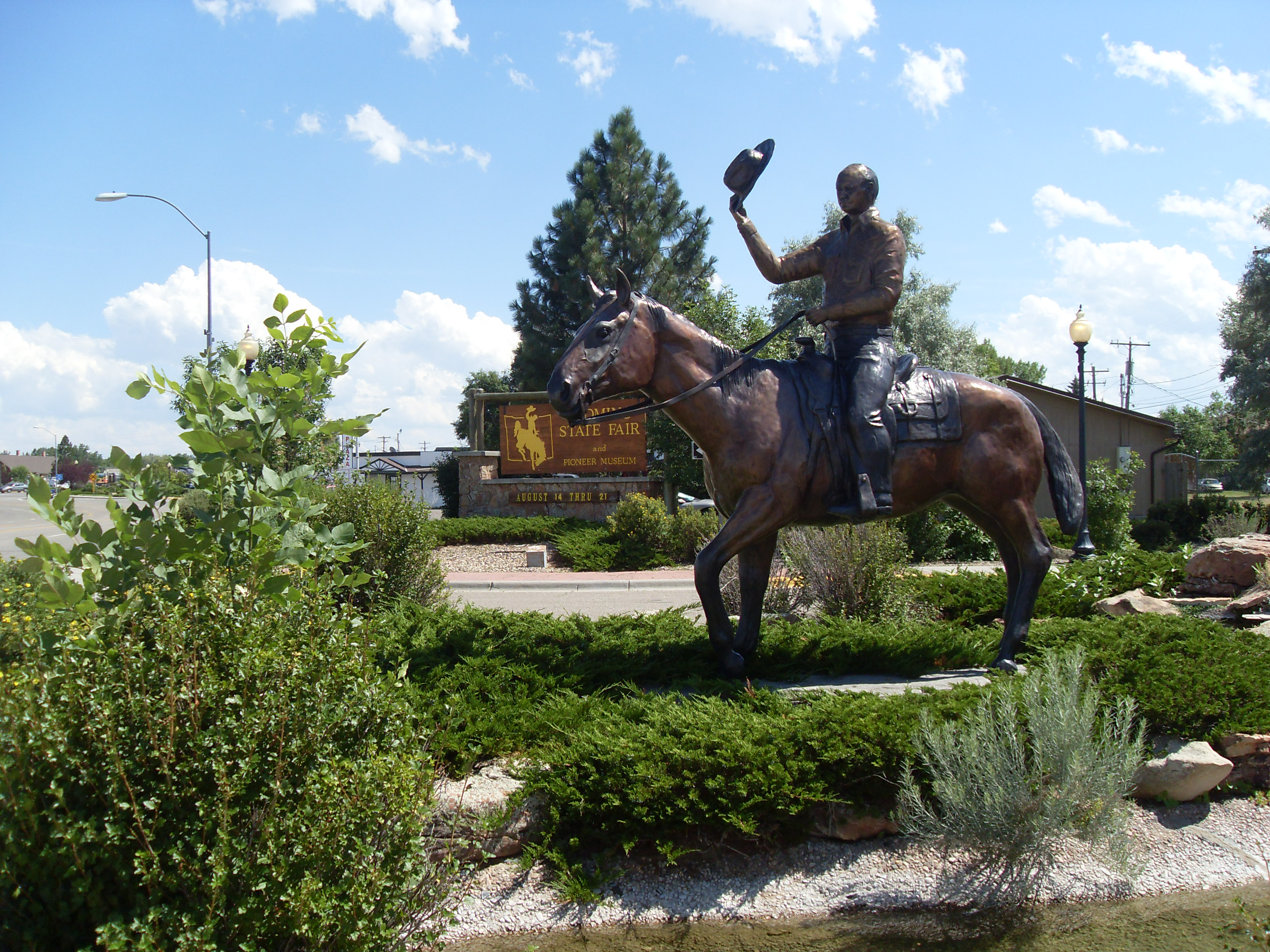
- Wyoming State Fair

- Location within the U.S. state of Wyoming
- Coordinates: 42°58′N 105°30′W
- Country: United States
- State: Wyoming
- Founded: March 9, 1888
- Named for: A.R. Converse
- Seat: Douglas
- Largest city: Douglas

Area
  - Total: 4,265 sq mi (11,050 km^{2})
  - Land: 4,255 sq mi (11,020 km^{2})
  - Water: 10 sq mi (26 km^{2}) 0.2%

Population (2020)
  - Total: 13,751
  - Estimate (2025): 13,824 ▲
  - Density: 3.232/sq mi (1.248/km^{2})
- Time zone: UTC−7 (Mountain)
  - Summer (DST): UTC−6 (MDT)
- Congressional district: At-large
- Website: www.conversecountywy.gov

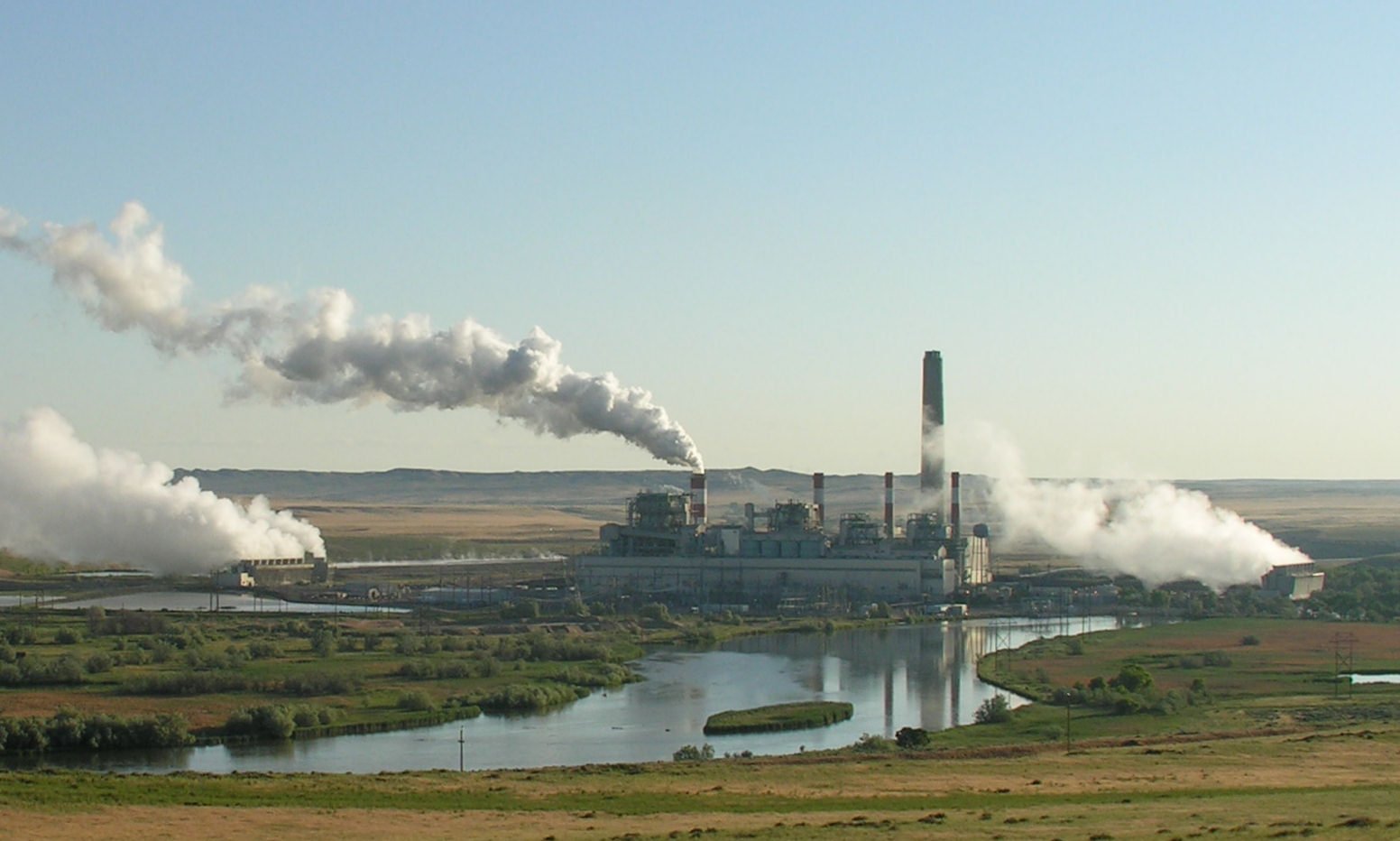
Dave Johnston power plant, a large coal-fired generating station at Glenrock, owned by PacifiCorp

Converse County is a county located in the U.S. state of Wyoming. As of the 2020 United States census, the population was 13,751. Its county seat is Douglas.

== History ==
Converse County was created in 1888 by the legislature of the Wyoming Territory, of area removed from Albany and Laramie counties.

Converse County was named for A.R. Converse, a banker and rancher from Cheyenne, Wyoming, who was co-owner with Francis E. Warren in a large ranch in the eastern part of Converse County.

A portion of Converse County territory was divided from the county for the formation of Niobrara County in 1911. Converse County was slightly enlarged with territory from Albany County in 1955 after a special election.

== Geography ==
According to the US Census Bureau, the county has a total area of 4,265 square miles (11,050 km^{2}), of which 4,255 square miles (11,020 km^{2}) is land and 10 square miles (26 km^{2}) (0.2%) is water.

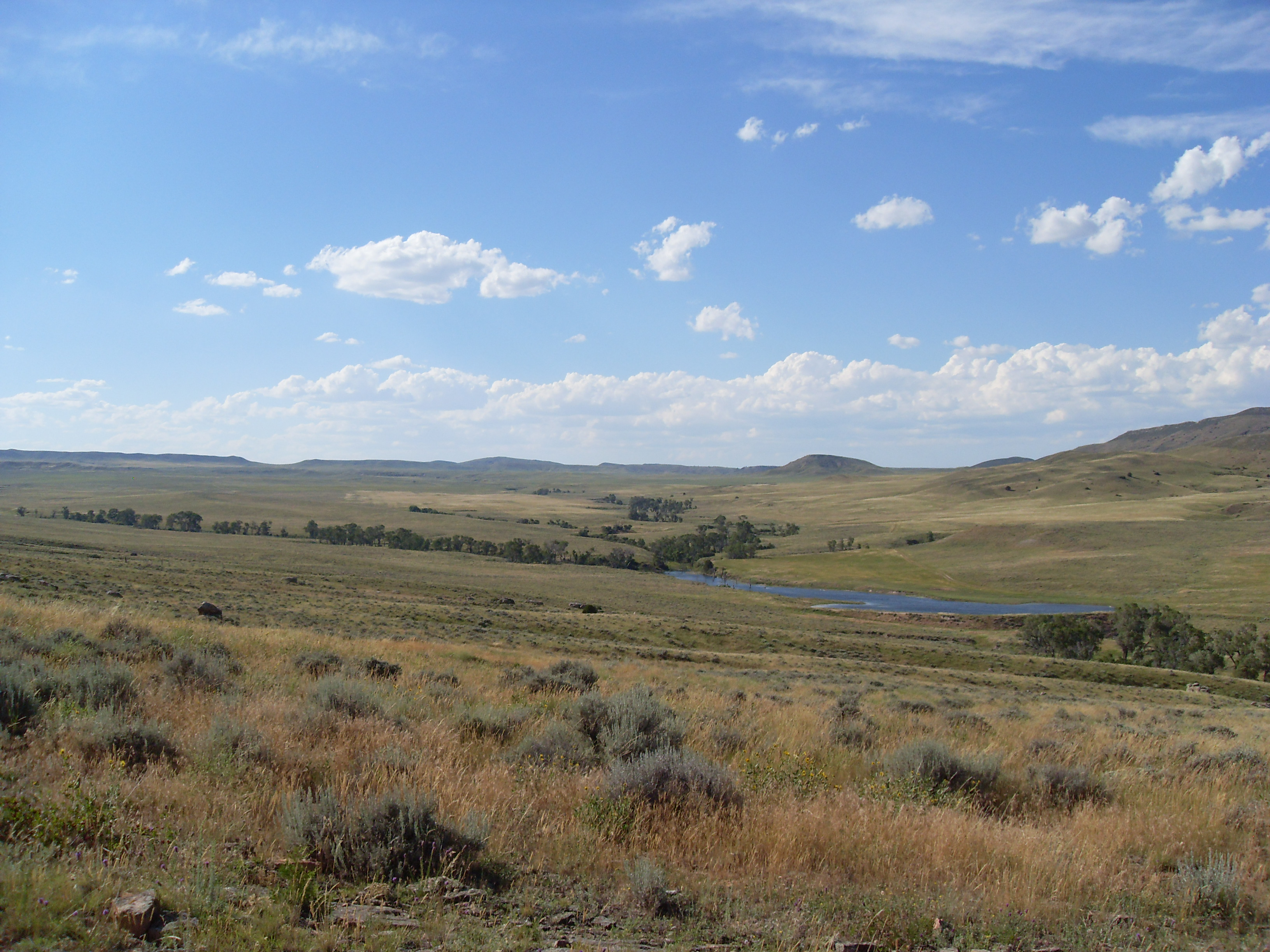
Landscape in Converse County

=== Adjacent counties ===
- Campbell County - north
- Weston County - northeast
- Niobrara County - east
- Platte County - southeast
- Albany County - south
- Carbon County - southwest
- Natrona County - west
- Johnson County - northwest

=== National protected areas ===
- Medicine Bow National Forest (part)
- Thunder Basin National Grassland (part)

=== Major highways ===
- Interstate 25
- U.S. Highway 18
- U.S. Highway 20
- U.S. Highway 26
- U.S. Highway 287
- Wyoming Highway 59

=== Transit ===
- Express Arrow

== Demographics ==
Historical population
Census	Pop.	Note	%±
1890	2,738		—
1900	3,337		21.9%
1910	6,294		88.6%
1920	7,871		25.1%
1930	7,145		−9.2%
1940	6,631		−7.2%
1950	5,933		−10.5%
1960	6,366		7.3%
1970	5,938		−6.7%
1980	14,069		136.9%
1990	11,128		−20.9%
2000	12,052		8.3%
2010	13,833		14.8%
2020	13,751		−0.6%
2025 (est.)	13,824	▲	0.5%
US Decennial Census; 1870–2000 2010–2020

=== 2020 census ===
As of the 2020 census, the county had a population of 13,751. Of the residents, 24.9% were under the age of 18 and 17.7% were 65 years of age or older; the median age was 40.2 years. For every 100 females there were 103.5 males, and for every 100 females age 18 and over there were 103.0 males.

Converse County, Wyoming – Racial and ethnic composition Note: the US Census treats Hispanic/Latino as an ethnic category. This table excludes Latinos from the racial categories and assigns them to a separate category. Hispanics/Latinos may be of any race.
Race / Ethnicity (NH = Non-Hispanic)	Pop 2000	Pop 2010	Pop 2020	% 2000	% 2010	% 2020
White alone (NH)	11,072	12,632	11,996	91.87%	91.32%	87.24%
Black or African American alone (NH)	18	43	39	0.15%	0.31%	0.28%
Native American or Alaska Native alone (NH)	95	88	72	0.79%	0.64%	0.52%
Asian alone (NH)	31	41	55	0.26%	0.30%	0.40%
Pacific Islander alone (NH)	3	1	0	0.02%	0.01%	0.00%
Other race alone (NH)	28	4	41	0.23%	0.03%	0.30%
Mixed race or Multiracial (NH)	145	157	486	1.20%	1.13%	3.53%
Hispanic or Latino (any race)	660	867	1,062	5.48%	6.27%	7.72%
Total	12,052	13,833	13,751	100.00%	100.00%	100.00%

The racial makeup of the county was 89.9% White, 0.3% Black or African American, 0.7% American Indian and Alaska Native, 0.4% Asian, 2.7% from some other race, and 6.0% from two or more races. Hispanic or Latino residents of any race comprised 7.7% of the population.

There were 5,693 households in the county, of which 30.5% had children under the age of 18 living with them and 21.6% had a female householder with no spouse or partner present. About 29.3% of all households were made up of individuals and 12.2% had someone living alone who was 65 years of age or older.

There were 6,612 housing units, of which 13.9% were vacant. Among occupied housing units, 74.3% were owner-occupied and 25.7% were renter-occupied. The homeowner vacancy rate was 1.9% and the rental vacancy rate was 17.1%.

=== 2010 census ===
As of the 2010 United States census, there were 13,833 people, 5,673 households, and 3,860 families in the county. The population density was 3.3 people per square mile (1.3 people/km^{2}). There were 6,403 housing units at an average density of 1.5 units per square mile (0.58 units/km^{2}). The racial makeup of the county was 95.1% white, 0.8% American Indian, 0.3% black or African American, 0.3% Asian, 0.1% Pacific islander, 1.7% from other races, and 1.7% from two or more races. Those of Hispanic or Latino origin made up 6.3% of the population. In terms of ancestry, 36.8% were German, 19.8% were Irish, 18.0% were English, and 6.2% were American.

Of the 5,673 households, 32.3% had children under the age of 18 living with them, 55.3% were married couples living together, 8.2% had a female householder with no husband present, 32.0% were non-families, and 26.5% of all households were made up of individuals. The average household size was 2.42 and the average family size was 2.93. The median age was 39.0 years.

The median income for a household in the county was $54,599 and the median income for a family was $69,057. Males had a median income of $54,863 versus $32,025 for females. The per capita income for the county was $27,656. About 4.5% of families and 7.7% of the population were below the poverty line, including 7.8% of those under age 18 and 7.4% of those age 65 or over.

=== 2000 census ===
As of the 2000 United States census, there were 12,052 people, 4,694 households, and 3,407 families in the county. The population density was 3 people per square mile (1.2 people/km^{2}). There were 5,669 housing units at an average density of 1 units per square mile (0.39 units/km^{2}). The racial makeup of the county was 94.72% White, 0.15% Black or African American, 0.91% Native American, 0.27% Asian, 0.02% Pacific Islander, 2.46% from other races, and 1.47% from two or more races. 5.48% of the population were Hispanic or Latino of any race. 26.6% were of German, 13.5% American, 12.2% English and 11.1% Irish ancestry.

There were 4,694 households, out of which 36.50% had children under the age of 18 living with them, 60.60% were married couples living together, 8.40% had a female householder with no husband present, and 27.40% were non-families. Of 4,694 households, 253 were unmarried partner households: 228 heterosexual, 12 same-sex male, and 13 same-sex female.

23.40% of all households were made up of individuals, and 9.00% had someone living alone who was 65 years of age or older. The average household size was 2.55 and the average family size was 3.01.

The county population contained 28.50% under the age of 18, 7.00% from 18 to 24, 28.10% from 25 to 44, 25.40% from 45 to 64, and 11.00% who were 65 years of age or older. The median age was 38 years. For every 100 females there were 99.40 males. For every 100 females age 18 and over, there were 96.40 males.

The median income for a household in the county was $39,603, and the median income for a family was $45,905. Males had a median income of $36,443 versus $19,032 for females. The per capita income for the county was $18,744. About 9.20% of families and 11.60% of the population were below the poverty line, including 15.70% of those under age 18 and 9.70% of those age 65 or over.

== Communities ==
=== City ===
- Douglas (county seat)

=== Towns ===
- Glenrock
- Rolling Hills
- Lost Springs

=== Census-designated places ===
- Esterbrook
- Orin

=== Other unincorporated communities ===
- Bill
- Boxelder
- Parkerton
- Shawnee

== Politics ==
Like most of Wyoming, Converse County is overwhelmingly Republican. Since Wyoming statehood in 1890, it has only been won by two Democrats – Woodrow Wilson in 1916 and Franklin D. Roosevelt in 1932 and 1936 – and even these two won the county by no more than eight percentage points. The last Democrat to win forty percent of the county's vote was Lyndon B. Johnson in 1964, and the last to pass so much as 22 percent was Bill Clinton in 1996.

United States presidential election results for Converse County, Wyoming
Year	Republican		Democratic		Third party(ies)	
Year	No.	%	No.	%	No.	%
1892	494	54.23%	0	0.00%	417	45.77%
1896	585	55.35%	459	43.42%	13	1.23%
1900	795	66.19%	406	33.81%	0	0.00%
1904	1,098	72.33%	395	26.02%	25	1.65%
1908	1,030	58.36%	716	40.57%	19	1.08%
1912	540	39.16%	436	31.62%	403	29.22%
1916	766	45.60%	879	52.32%	35	2.08%
1920	1,561	69.41%	679	30.19%	9	0.40%
1924	1,758	58.46%	524	17.43%	725	24.11%
1928	2,040	70.52%	845	29.21%	8	0.28%
1932	1,569	45.13%	1,860	53.49%	48	1.38%
1936	1,556	47.86%	1,639	50.42%	56	1.72%
1940	1,889	57.49%	1,395	42.45%	2	0.06%
1944	1,601	62.05%	979	37.95%	0	0.00%
1948	1,327	56.76%	996	42.60%	15	0.64%
1952	2,056	70.51%	850	29.15%	10	0.34%
1956	1,855	71.18%	751	28.82%	0	0.00%
1960	1,933	67.61%	926	32.39%	0	0.00%
1964	1,559	55.50%	1,250	44.50%	0	0.00%
1968	1,658	69.61%	492	20.65%	232	9.74%
1972	2,312	77.07%	682	22.73%	6	0.20%
1976	2,188	65.37%	1,150	34.36%	9	0.27%
1980	2,987	70.63%	922	21.80%	320	7.57%
1984	3,542	78.31%	929	20.54%	52	1.15%
1988	2,885	68.45%	1,301	30.87%	29	0.69%
1992	2,159	45.44%	1,307	27.51%	1,285	27.05%
1996	2,702	55.02%	1,520	30.95%	689	14.03%
2000	3,919	75.73%	1,076	20.79%	180	3.48%
2004	4,447	77.68%	1,184	20.68%	94	1.64%
2008	4,922	76.30%	1,380	21.39%	149	2.31%
2012	5,043	79.50%	1,089	17.17%	211	3.33%
2016	5,520	82.96%	668	10.04%	466	7.00%
2020	5,917	84.89%	861	12.35%	192	2.75%
2024	5,756	85.41%	845	12.54%	138	2.05%

== Education ==
The county has two school districts: Converse County School District Number 1 and Converse County School District Number 2.

== See also ==
- National Register of Historic Places listings in Converse County, Wyoming
- Wyoming
  - List of cities and towns in Wyoming
  - List of counties in Wyoming
  - Wyoming statistical areas
