= Recluse, Wyoming =

- Unincorporated community
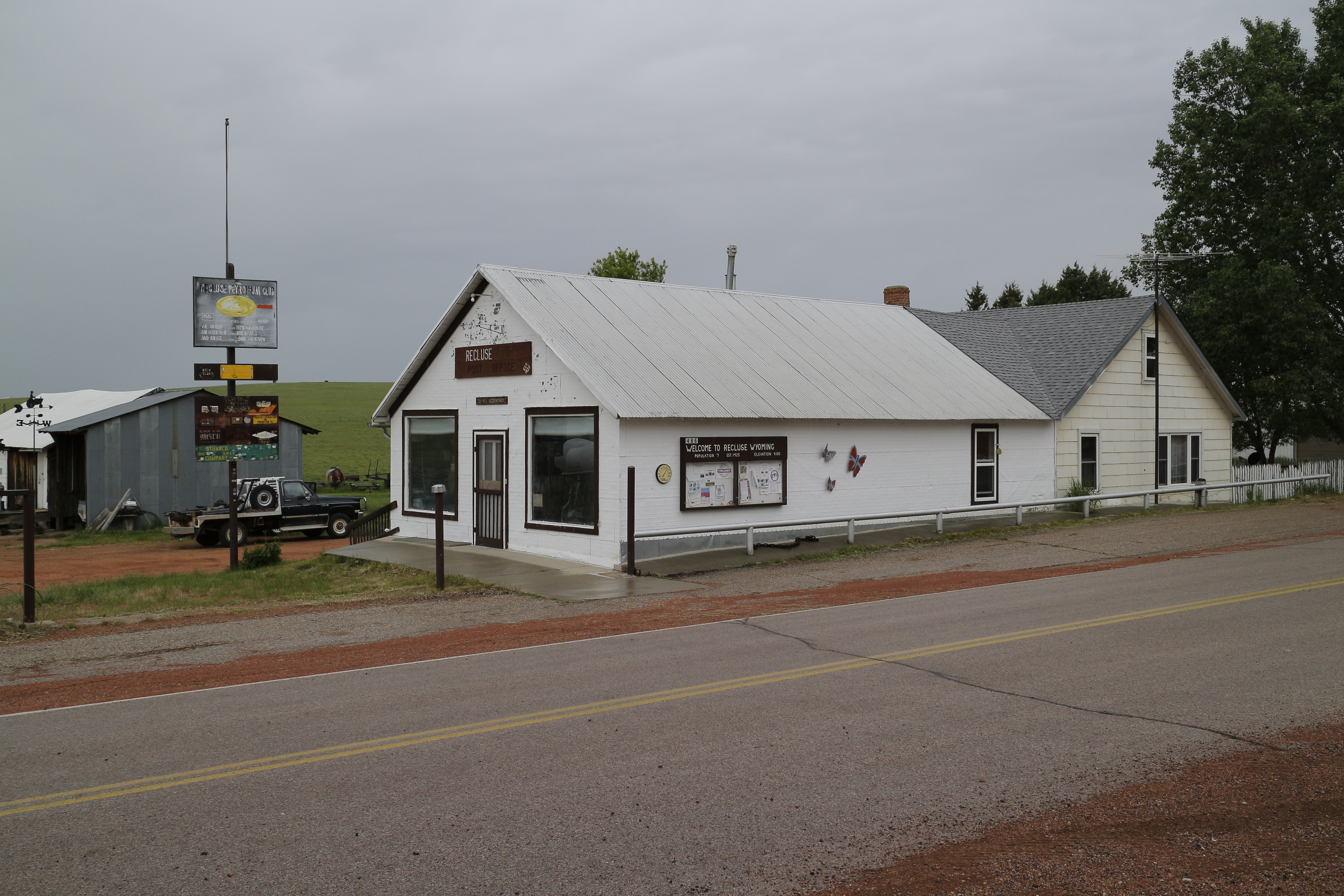
- Building with welcome sign and community bulletin board in Recluse

- Location within the state of Wyoming Recluse (the United States)
- Coordinates: 44°44′28″N 105°42′29″W
- Country: United States
- State: Wyoming
- County: Campbell
- Elevation: 4,111 ft (1,253 m)

Population (2000)
  - Total: 7
- Time zone: UTC-7 (Mountain (MST))
  - Summer (DST): UTC-6 (MDT)
- ZIP codes: 82725
- GNIS feature ID: 1597468

Recluse is a small unincorporated community in Campbell County, Wyoming, United States.

A post office has been in operation at Recluse since 1924. The community was so named on account of its isolated location.

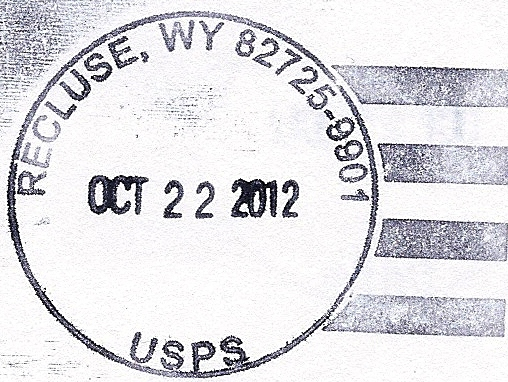

== Notable people ==
- Sue Wallis - rancher and Republican member of the Wyoming House of Representatives from Campbell County
- Dexter Lumis - WWE Wrestler (Kayfabe)
