= Sue Wallis =

American politician

Member of the Wyoming House of Representatives from the 52nd district
- In office January 2007 – January 28, 2014
- Preceded by: Burke Jackson
- Succeeded by: Troy Mader

Personal details
- Born: October 9, 1957 Gillette, Wyoming, U.S.
- Died: c. January 28, 2014 (aged 56) Gillette, Wyoming, U.S.
- Party: Republican
- Education: University of Wyoming
- Website: wallisforwyohouse.com

Sue Ellen Wallis (October 9, 1957 – January 28, 2014) was an American politician. She was a Republican member of the Wyoming House of Representatives who represented District 52 from January 2007 until her death in January 2014.

== Personal life ==
Wallis, who attended the University of Wyoming at Laramie, was a rancher and the daughter of former legislator Dick Wallis. She had resided in Recluse.

== Elections ==
- 2012, Wallis won the three-way August 21, 2012 Republican primary with 520 votes (44.5%), and was unopposed for the November 6, 2012 general election, winning with 2,939 votes.
- 2006, When Republican Representative Burke Jackson did not seek re-election to the District 52 seat in the Wyoming House, Wallis won the August 22, 2006 Republican primary with 818 votes (52.3%), and was unopposed for the November 7, 2006 General election, winning with 2,238 votes.
- 2008, Wallis was unopposed for both the August 19, 2008 Republican primary, winning with 1,111 votes, and she won the November 4, 2008 general election with 3,462 votes.
- 2010, Wallis won the August 17, 2010 Republican primary with 1,022 votes (50.3%), and won the three-way November 2, 2010 general election with 1,687 votes (57.2%) against Independent candidate Travis Hakert and Libertarian Nicholas De Laat.

== Death ==
Wallis was found dead at age 56 on January 28, 2014, at a hotel in her native Gillette, Wyoming. The cause of death has not yet been disclosed.
