= Thunder Basin National Grassland =

Protected area in Wyoming, US

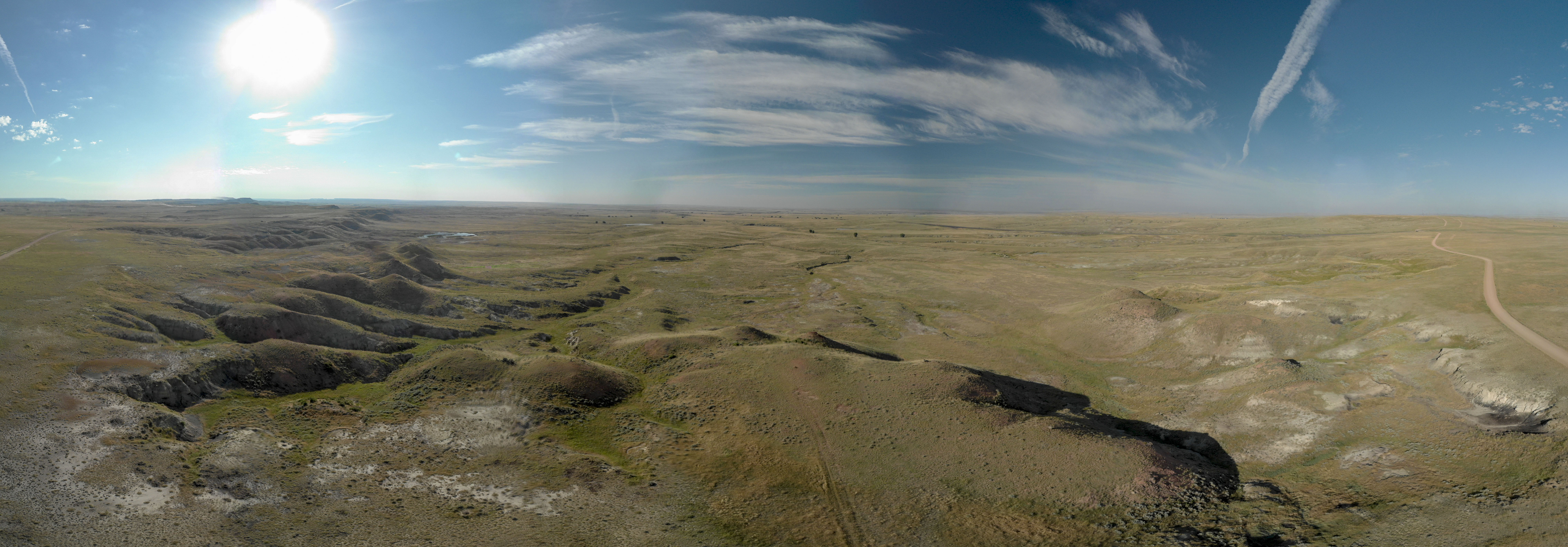
- Thunder Basin National Grassland

- Location within Wyoming Location within the United States
- Interactive map of Thunder Basin National Grassland
- Location: Wyoming, United States
- Nearest city: Gillette, WY
- Coordinates: 43.68°N 105.02°W
- Area: 547,499 acres (2,215.65 km^{2})
- Established: June 23, 1960
- Governing body: U.S. Forest Service
- Website: Medicine Bow-Routt National Forests & Thunder Basin National Grassland

The Thunder Basin National Grassland is located in northeastern Wyoming in the Powder River Basin between the Big Horn Mountains and the Black Hills. The Grassland ranges in elevation from 3,600 to 5,200 feet (1,100 to 1,600 m), and the climate is semi-arid. The Grassland provides opportunities for recreation, including hiking, sightseeing, hunting, and fishing. There are no developed campgrounds; however, camping is allowed. Land patterns are very complex because of the intermingled federal, state, and private lands.

In descending order of land area, it is located in parts of Weston, Converse, Campbell, Niobrara, and Crook counties. It is managed together with Medicine Bow - Routt National Forest from Forest Service offices in Laramie, Wyoming; its local ranger district office is in Douglas.

== Ecology ==
Thunder Basin National Grassland is found along the ecotone, or transition zone, between the Great Plains to the east and the sagebrush steppe to the west, and occurs across a gradient of temperature, precipitation, and elevation. As with grasslands in the Great Plains, the Thunder Basin evolved with disturbance from drought, grazing, fire and burrowing mammals. Burrowing mammals play a functional role in the grasslands. Prairie dogs increase habitat heterogeneity and biodiversity at multiple scales across the landscape by creating burrows and areas of open grassland habitat that differ from the surrounding areas and serve as habitat for other species.

Thunder Basin grassland is home to over 100 species of birds; large herbivores such as pronghorn and mule deer; small mammals like black-tailed prairie dogs, white-tailed jackrabbits, cotton tails, kangaroo rats, thirteen lined-ground squirrels, and bats; and predators such as swift fox, badgers, coyote and red fox. Domestic livestock grazing (sheep and cattle) is practiced by ranching families throughout the grassland.

The area includes both sagebrush and grassland plant communities, which interact with a range of ecological disturbances to support diverse wildlife species. Management for biodiversity in this complex ecosystem depends on managing for a shifting mosaic of different disturbances to meet the needs of multiple species. Researchers surveyed birds on active black-tailed prairie dog colonies and previously burned areas, as well as on paired undisturbed sites, and found that only prairie dog colonies supported breeding habitat for the imperiled mountain plover (Anarhynchus montanus). Large, contiguous areas of sagebrush cover are required to support sage-grouse conservation.

An area with prairie dog colonies of nearly 25,000 acres (10,000 ha) was reduced to about 125 acres (51 ha) after an outbreak of sylvatic plague in 2017. A 2002 grassland plan proposed providing 50,000 acres (20,000 ha) of prairie dog habitat.

In Thunder Basin, historical wildfires do not promote the invasion of cheatgrass (Bromus tectorum) as they do in the Great Basin, where a fire-invasion feedback loop leads to plant community conversion in sagebrush ecosystems.
