= Douglas High School (Wyoming) =

Location
- 1701 Hamilton Street; Douglas, Wyoming; United States
- Coordinates: 42.7510°N 105.3669°W

Information
- Type: Public
- School district: Converse County School District 1
- NCES School ID: 560214000127
- Principal: Justin Carr
- Teaching staff: 43.46 (on an FTE basis)
- Grades: 9–12
- Enrollment: 511 (2024–2025)
- Student to teacher ratio: 11.76
- Colors: Blue and white
- Mascot: Bearcat
- Website: dhs.ccsd1.org

Douglas High School is a public high school in Douglas, Wyoming, United States.

Its mascot is the Bearcat, and its school colors are blue and white.

It won its third consecutive 3A State Football Championship in 2010.

It is one of four public schools in Douglas, a town of about 6,100 people, and part of Converse County School District 1. Other schools in the district include Primary (grades K–1, Douglas Intermediate School (grades 2–3), Douglas Upper Elementary (grades 4–5), and Douglas Middle School (grades 6–8).
