= Campbell County, Wyoming =

County in Wyoming, United States

- County
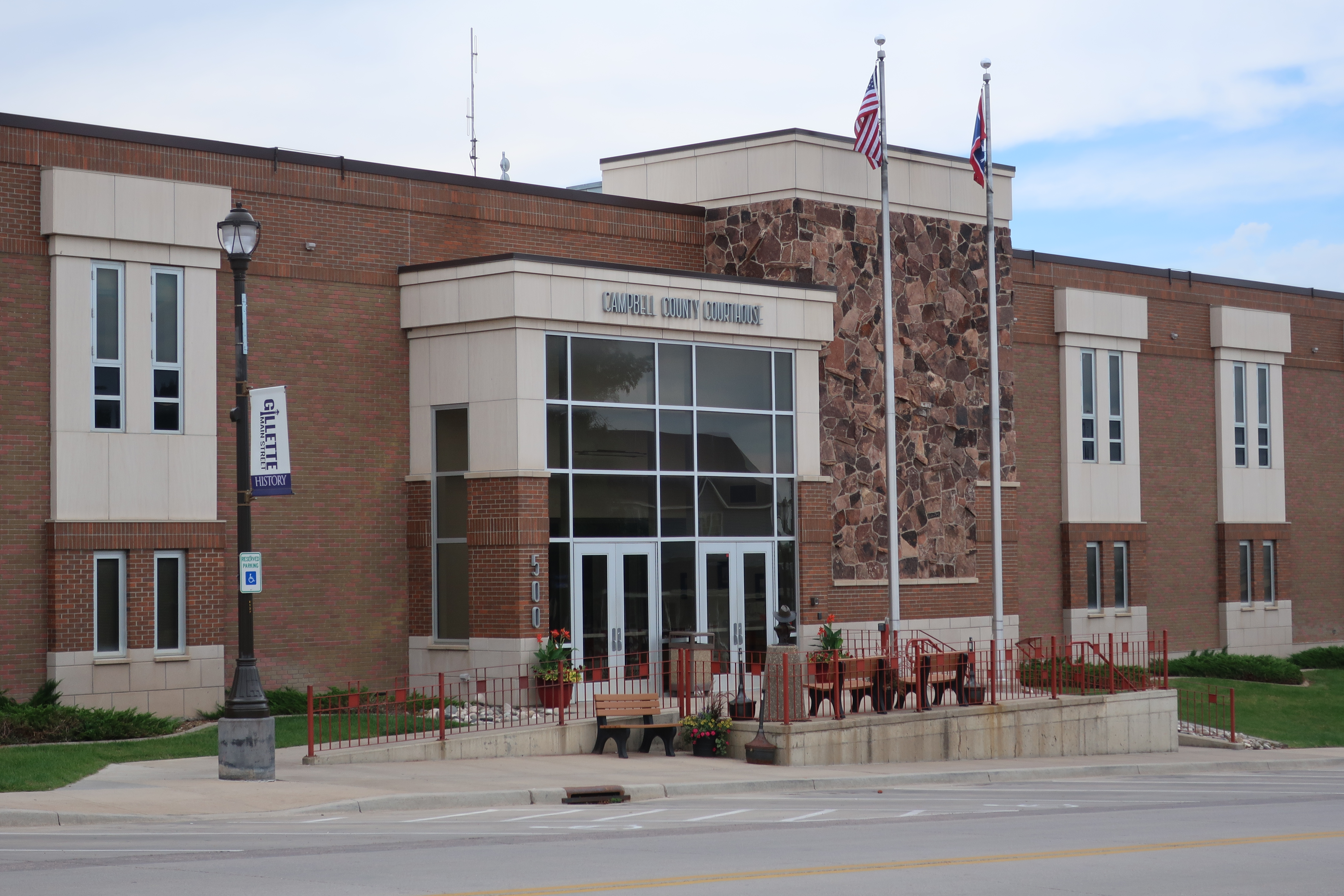
- Campbell County Courthouse

- Flag

- Location within the U.S. state of Wyoming
- Coordinates: 44°14′N 105°33′W
- Country: United States
- State: Wyoming
- Founded: February 21, 1911
- Named for: Robert Campbell
- Seat: Gillette
- Largest city: Gillette

Area
  - Total: 4,807 sq mi (12,450 km^{2})
  - Land: 4,803 sq mi (12,440 km^{2})
  - Water: 4.0 sq mi (10 km^{2}) 0.08%

Population (2020)
  - Total: 47,026
  - Estimate (2025): 48,145 ▲
  - Density: 9.791/sq mi (3.780/km^{2})
- Time zone: UTC−7 (Mountain)
  - Summer (DST): UTC−6 (MDT)
- Congressional district: At-large
- Website: www.campbellcountywy.gov

Campbell County is a county in the U.S. state of Wyoming. As of the 2020 United States census, the population was 47,026, making it the third-most populous county in Wyoming. Its county seat is Gillette. Campbell County comprises the Gillette, WY Micropolitan Statistical Area.

== History ==
Campbell County was created in 1911 from land annexed from Crook and Weston Counties. It was named either for John Allen Campbell, a governor of the Wyoming Territory, or for Robert Campbell, a trapper and fur trader associated with William Henry Ashley.

== Geography ==
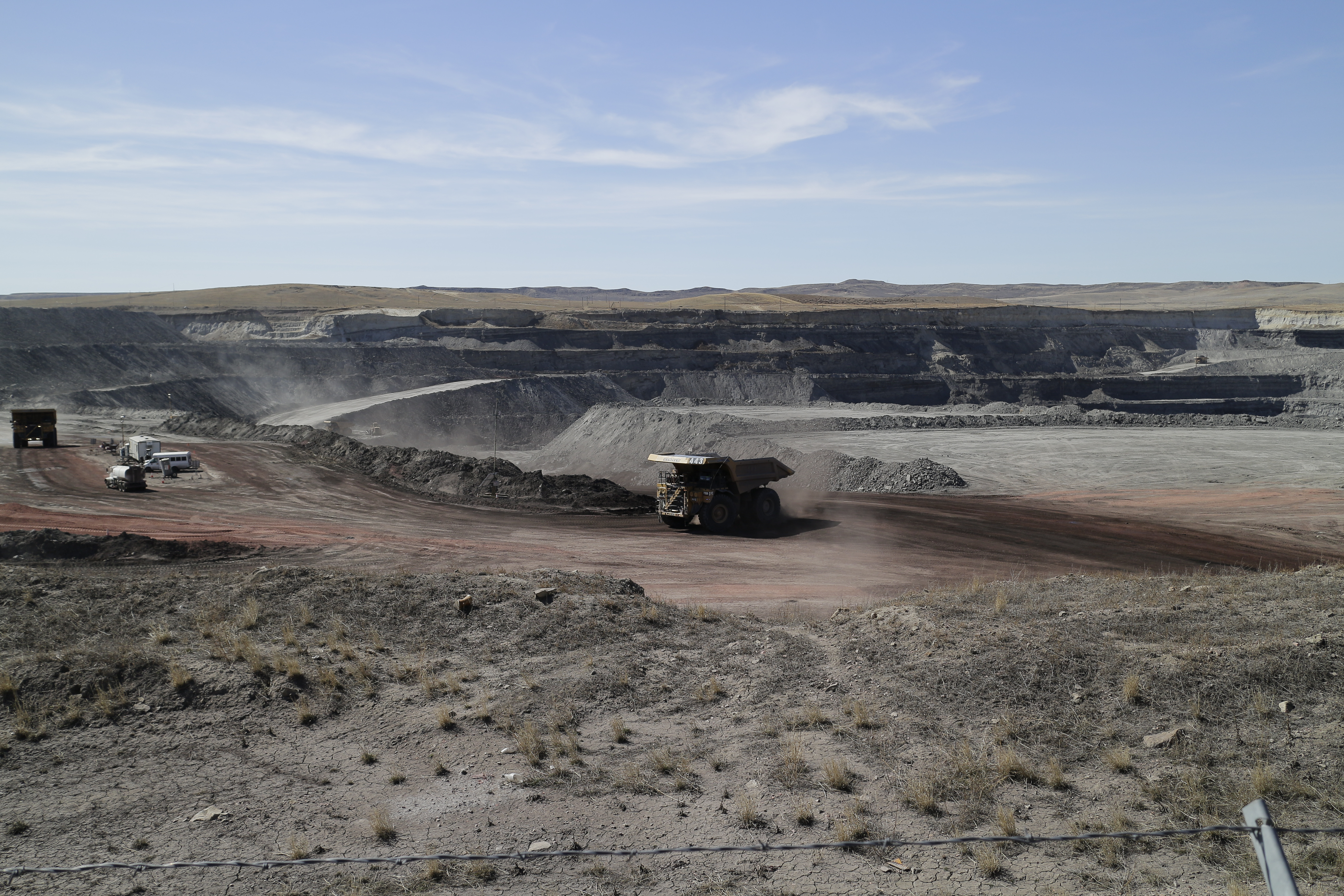
Eagle Butte coal mine north of Gillette

According to the U.S. Census Bureau, the county has an area of 4,807 square miles (12,450 km^{2}), of which 4,803 square miles (12,440 km^{2}) is land and 4.0 square miles (10 km^{2}) (9.6%) is water.

=== Adjacent counties ===
- Powder River County, Montana – north
- Crook County – northeast
- Weston County – southeast
- Converse County – south
- Johnson County – southwest
- Sheridan County – west

=== Major highways ===
- Interstate 90
- I-90 BL
- U.S. Highway 14
- U.S. Highway 16
- Wyoming Highway 50
- Wyoming Highway 51
- Wyoming Highway 59
- Wyoming Highway 387
- Wyoming Highway 450

=== Transit ===
- Jefferson Lines

=== National protected area ===
- Thunder Basin National Grassland (part)

== Demographics ==
Historical population
Census	Pop.	Note	%±
1920	5,233		—
1930	6,720		28.4%
1940	6,048		−10.0%
1950	4,839		−20.0%
1960	5,861		21.1%
1970	12,957		121.1%
1980	24,367		88.1%
1990	29,370		20.5%
2000	33,698		14.7%
2010	46,133		36.9%
2020	47,026		1.9%
2025 (est.)	48,145	▲	2.4%
US Decennial Census; 1870–2000 2010–2020

=== 2020 census ===
As of the 2020 census, the county had a population of 47,026. Of the residents, 28.0% were under the age of 18 and 11.0% were 65 years of age or older; the median age was 34.8 years. For every 100 females there were 105.0 males, and for every 100 females age 18 and over there were 106.0 males.

Campbell County, Wyoming – Racial and ethnic composition Note: the US Census treats Hispanic/Latino as an ethnic category. This table excludes Latinos from the racial categories and assigns them to a separate category. Hispanics/Latinos may be of any race.
Race / Ethnicity (NH = Non-Hispanic)	Pop 2000	Pop 2010	Pop 2020	% 2000	% 2010	% 2020
White alone (NH)	31,701	41,032	39,601	94.07%	88.94%	84.21%
Black or African American alone (NH)	47	134	219	0.14%	0.29%	0.47%
Native American or Alaska Native alone (NH)	280	415	509	0.83%	0.90%	1.08%
Asian alone (NH)	100	250	320	0.30%	0.54%	0.68%
Pacific Islander alone (NH)	28	18	25	0.08%	0.04%	0.05%
Other race alone (NH)	11	24	188	0.03%	0.05%	0.40%
Mixed race or Multiracial (NH)	340	649	1,881	1.01%	1.41%	4.00%
Hispanic or Latino (any race)	1,191	3,611	4,283	3.53%	7.83%	9.11%
Total	33,698	46,133	47,026	100.00%	100.00%	100.00%

The racial makeup of the county was 86.7% White, 0.5% Black or African American, 1.3% American Indian and Alaska Native, 0.7% Asian, 4.2% from some other race, and 6.5% from two or more races. Hispanic or Latino residents of any race comprised 9.1% of the population.

There were 17,822 households in the county, of which 36.5% had children under the age of 18 living with them and 18.9% had a female householder with no spouse or partner present. About 24.6% of all households were made up of individuals and 7.0% had someone living alone who was 65 years of age or older.

There were 19,816 housing units, of which 10.1% were vacant. Among occupied housing units, 72.5% were owner-occupied and 27.5% were renter-occupied. The homeowner vacancy rate was 2.1% and the rental vacancy rate was 14.3%.

=== 2010 census ===
As of the 2010 United States census, there were 46,133 people, 17,172 households, and 11,933 families in the county. The population density was 9.6 people per square mile (3.7 people/km^{2}). There were 18,955 housing units at an average density of 3.9 units per square mile (1.5 units/km^{2}). The racial makeup of the county was 93.2% white, 1.2% American Indian, 0.6% Asian, 0.3% black or African American, 2.7% from other races, and 2.1% from two or more races. Those of Hispanic or Latino origin made up 7.8% of the population. In terms of ancestry, 32.2% were German, 15.9% were Irish, 10.8% were English, 5.5% were American, and 5.1% were Norwegian.

Of the 17,172 households, 39.0% had children under the age of 18 living with them, 54.0% were married couples living together, 8.6% had a female householder with no husband present, 30.5% were non-families, and 22.4% of all households were made up of individuals. The average household size was 2.66 and the average family size was 3.11. The median age was 31.9 years.

The median income for a household in the county was $76,576 and the median income for a family was $83,965. Males had a median income of $61,393 versus $31,769 for females. The per capita income for the county was $31,968. About 5.9% of families and 6.9% of the population were below the poverty line, including 10.5% of those under age 18 and 3.9% of those age 65 or over.

=== 2000 census ===
As of the 2000 United States census, there were 33,698 people, 12,207 households, and 9,008 families in the county. The population density was 7 people per square mile (2.7 people/km^{2}). There were 13,288 housing units at an average density of 3 units per square mile (1.2 units/km^{2}). The racial makeup of the county was 96.06% White, 0.15% Black or African American, 0.93% Native American, 0.32% Asian, 0.09% Pacific Islander, 1.12% from other races, and 1.34% from two or more races. 3.53% of the population were Hispanic or Latino of any race. 30.3% were of German, 11.4% English, 11.0% Irish, 8.5% American and 6.2% Norwegian ancestry.

There were 12,207 households, out of which 43.10% had children under the age of 18 living with them, 59.80% were married couples living together, 8.80% had a female householder with no husband present, and 26.20% were non-families. Of 12,207 households, 785 were unmarried partner households: 675 heterosexual, 52 same-sex male, and 58 same-sex female.

20.20% of all households were made up of individuals, and 3.90% had someone living alone who was 65 years of age or older. The average household size was 2.73 and the average family size was 3.16.

The county population contained 31.00% under the age of 18, 9.50% from 18 to 24, 32.30% from 25 to 44, 21.90% from 45 to 64, and 5.30% who were 65 years of age or older. The median age was 32 years. For every 100 females there were 105.60 males. For every 100 females age 18 and over, there were 104.10 males.

The median income for a household in the county was $76,576, and the median income for a family was $53,927. Males had a median income of $41,814 versus $21,914 for females. The per capita income for the county was $20,063. About 5.60% of families and 7.60% of the population were below the poverty line, including 7.70% of those under age 18 and 12.40% of those age 65 or over.

== Communities ==
=== City ===
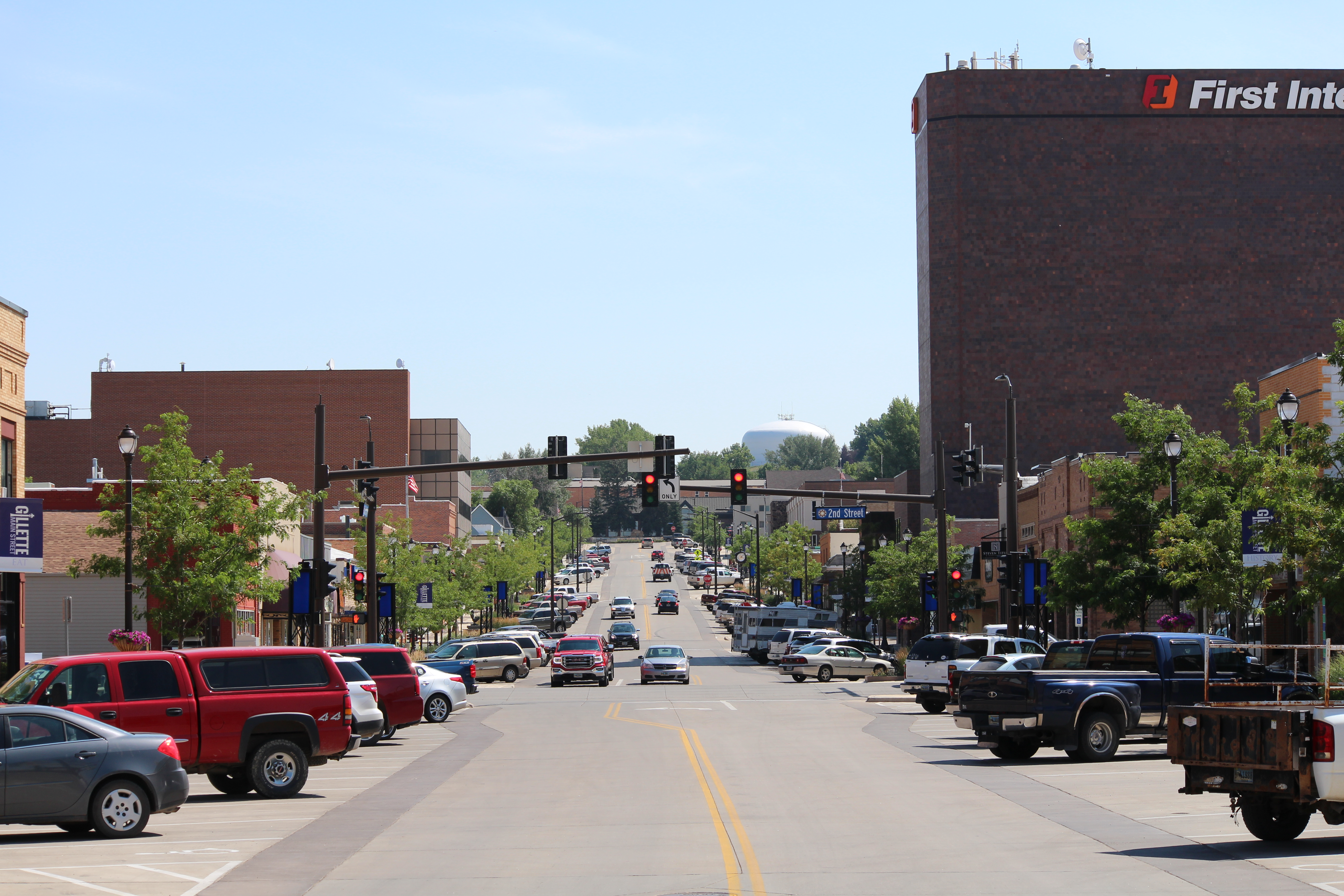
Downtown Gillette on South Gillette Avenue looking south

- Gillette (county seat)

=== Town ===
- Wright

=== Census-designated places ===
- Sleepy Hollow

=== Unincorporated communities ===
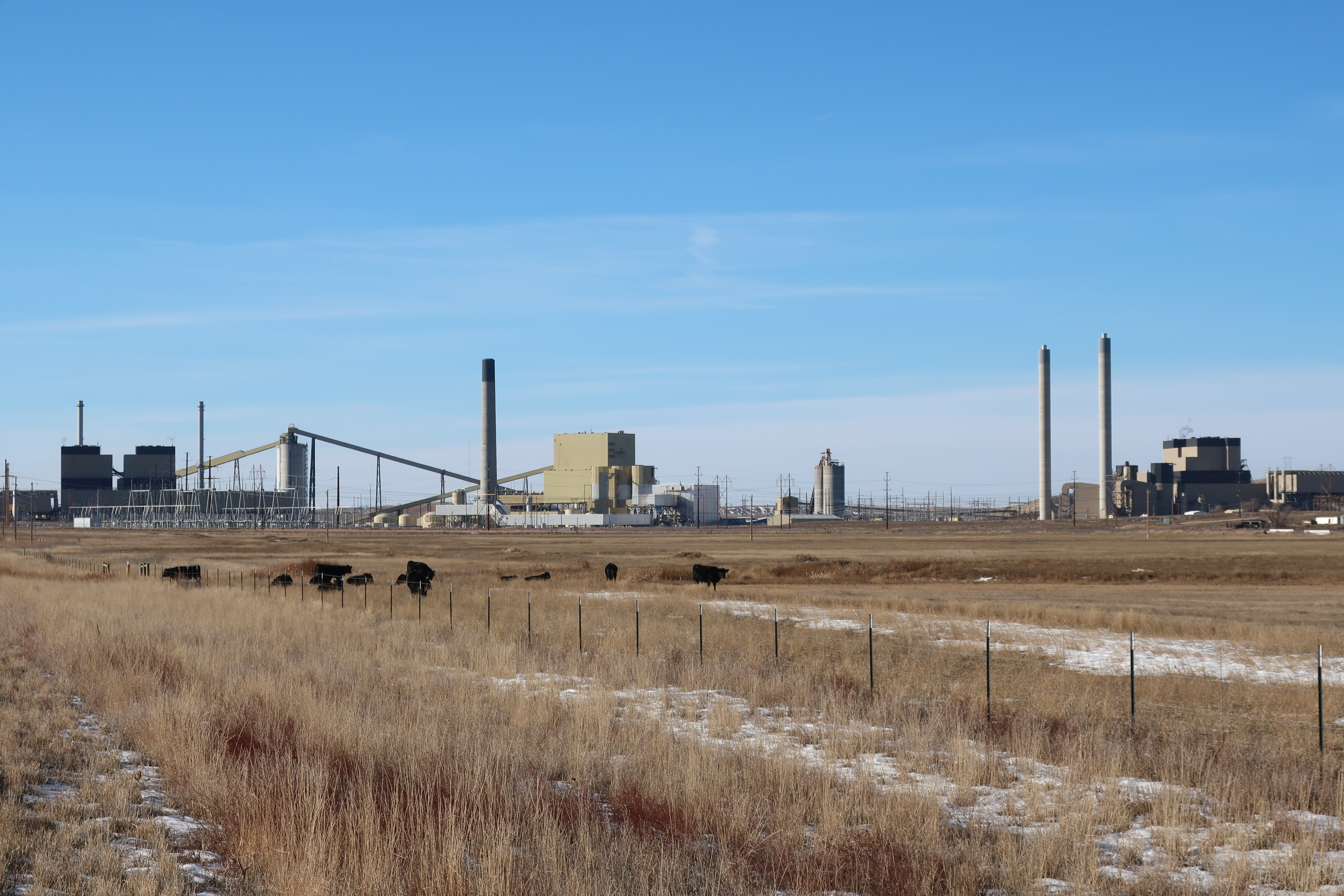
Wyodak seen from Wyoming Highway 51

- Croton
- Echeta
- Pleastantdale
- Recluse
- Rozet
- Savageton
- Spotted Horse
- Weston
- Wyodak

=== Former census-designated place ===
- Antelope Valley-Crestview (Note: The Antelope Valley-Crestview CDP was annexed by the city of Gillette in 2018.)

== Politics ==
Campbell County is overwhelmingly Republican. No Democratic presidential candidate has carried Campbell County since Franklin D. Roosevelt won 46 of 48 contemporary states against Alf Landon in 1936. Since 1950, the only Democrat to have won forty percent of the county's vote is Lyndon Johnson in his 1964 landslide victory against Barry Goldwater, and in the subsequent half-century no Democrat has passed one-third of the county's vote. In the 21st century, no Democrat has won even 20% of the vote.

United States presidential election results for Campbell County, Wyoming
Year	Republican		Democratic		Third party(ies)	
Year	No.	%	No.	%	No.	%
1912	186	25.14%	361	48.78%	193	26.08%
1916	448	38.62%	690	59.48%	22	1.90%
1920	1,027	66.69%	493	32.01%	20	1.30%
1924	1,121	52.36%	577	26.95%	443	20.69%
1928	1,528	66.52%	744	32.39%	25	1.09%
1932	1,161	38.96%	1,728	57.99%	91	3.05%
1936	1,322	47.49%	1,435	51.54%	27	0.97%
1940	1,540	57.57%	1,128	42.17%	7	0.26%
1944	1,514	62.87%	894	37.13%	0	0.00%
1948	1,201	57.99%	856	41.33%	14	0.68%
1952	1,823	73.10%	666	26.70%	5	0.20%
1956	1,473	69.19%	656	30.81%	0	0.00%
1960	1,575	64.66%	861	35.34%	0	0.00%
1964	1,606	57.32%	1,196	42.68%	0	0.00%
1968	1,694	66.67%	558	21.96%	289	11.37%
1972	2,953	78.64%	783	20.85%	19	0.51%
1976	3,306	66.19%	1,620	32.43%	69	1.38%
1980	5,613	73.19%	1,400	18.26%	656	8.55%
1984	8,387	83.91%	1,525	15.26%	83	0.83%
1988	6,702	73.55%	2,288	25.11%	122	1.34%
1992	5,315	47.42%	2,709	24.17%	3,184	28.41%
1996	6,382	53.68%	3,468	29.17%	2,039	17.15%
2000	10,203	81.36%	1,967	15.69%	370	2.95%
2004	12,415	82.22%	2,464	16.32%	220	1.46%
2008	13,011	79.72%	2,990	18.32%	319	1.95%
2012	14,953	85.10%	2,163	12.31%	455	2.59%
2016	15,778	86.70%	1,324	7.28%	1,097	6.03%
2020	16,975	86.76%	1,935	9.89%	656	3.35%
2024	16,006	87.26%	2,004	10.93%	332	1.81%

== Notable people ==
- Tom Lubnau, Speaker of the Wyoming House of Representatives
- Sue Wallis, Republican member of the Wyoming House from Campbell County

== See also ==
- National Register of Historic Places listings in Campbell County, Wyoming
- Wyoming
  - List of cities and towns in Wyoming
  - List of counties in Wyoming
  - Wyoming statistical areas
