= Wyoming Highway 410 =

State highway in Uinta County, Wyoming, United States

Wyoming Highway 410
- WYO 410 highlighted in red

Route information
- Maintained by Wyoming Department of Transportation
- Length: 13.36 mi (21.50 km)
- Existed: June 1971–present

Major junctions
- South end: CR 204 west of Robertson
- WYO 411 southwest of Mountain View
- North end: WYO 414 in Mountain View

Location
- Country: United States
- State: Wyoming
- Counties: Uinta

Highway system
- Wyoming State Highway System; Interstate; US; State
← WYO 391	→ WYO 411

Wyoming Highway 410 (WYO 410) is a 13.36-mile (21.50 km) state highway in Uinta County, Wyoming, United States, that connects areas west of Roberston with Mountain View.

== Route description ==
For its entire length, WYO 410 runs through rural flatland as a two-lane road.

=== East–west section ===
WYO 410 begins at the end of pavement at the west end of Uinta County Road 204 (CR 204), 1.16 miles (1.87 km) west of Blacks Fork river and 4.12 miles (6.63 km) west of Robertson. (CR 204 continues westerly toward Piedmont - a former small railroad and timber settlement which has become a ghost town.) About 50 feet (15 m) from its southern terminus WYO 410, connects with the eastern end of Uinta County Road 271 (CR 271) at a Y intersection. (CR 271 heads southerly to the Meeks Cabin Reservoir near the Utah State Line.) From its southern terminus WYO 410 runs east-southeasterly for just under 1 mile (1.6 km) before reaching the southern end of Uinta County Road 275 at a T intersection.

Heading easterly, WYO 410 quickly crosses Blacks Fork and, shortly thereafter, connects with the north end of Uinta County Road 273 at a T intersection. About 1.3 miles (2.1 km) later, after assuming a due east course and crossing both Willow Creek and Smiths Fork, WYO 410 reaches a junction with the south end of Uinta County Road 261 and the north end of Uinta County Road 279 (CR 279) on the western edge of the census-designated place of Robertson. (CR 279 heads southerly toward the Uinta-Wasatch-Cache National Forest.) Still heading due east, WYO 410 runs through Robertson, passing by its post office along the way.

WYO 410 arrives at a junction with the south end of Uinta County Road 263 (CR 263) and the north end of Uinta County Road 274 (CR 274) on the eastern edge of Robertson. (CR 263 heads northerly to end at Wyoming Highway 411 [WYO 411]. CR 279 heads south and then west along the edge of Robertson to end at CR 279.) After continuing east for about 2 miles (3.2 km), WYO 410 curves to head north. In the middle of the curve, WYO 410 has a junction with the north end of Uinta County Road 283 (CR 283) at a T intersection. (CR 283 heads southerly toward the Uinta-Wasatch-Cache National Forest.)

=== North–south section ===
About 1.5 miles (2.4 km) after turning north, WYO 410 connects with the east end of Uinta County Road 270 at a T intersection. Shortly thereafter, the highway curves to head very briefly east before curving back to head north on the Tipperary Bench Nearly 2 miles (3.2 km) later the highway connects with the east end of Uinta County Road 266 at a T intersection. About 1 mile (1.6 km) farther north WYO 410 curves to head northeast and descend the Tipperary Bench. After about 1.5 miles (2.4 km) farther on its northeast course, WYO 410 reaches its junction with the west end of Wyoming Highway 411 (WYO 411) at a T intersection, just west of the north end of Tipperary Bench. (WYO 410 heads west toward the unincorporated community of Millburne.)

About 0.3 miles (0.48 km) north of the WYO 411 junction, and after it crosses Smiths for a second time, WYO 410 begins running briefly along the western city limits of Mountain View as West Street before turning east and entering the town along West 2nd Street. (West Street continues north for several blocks.) After turning east, WYO 410 crosses Spruce, Pine, and Cedar streets, before connecting with the north end of Birch Street on the south side of Mountain View Middle School. Just after connecting with the south end of North Alder Street, WYO 410 reaches is eastern terminus at it junction with Wyoming Highway 414 (WYO 414) at a T intersection. (WYO 414 heads north through Urie and Lyman before ending at an interchange with Interstate 80 and Wyoming Highway 412. WYO 414 head southeasterly through Lonetree and McKinnon before ending at the Utah State Line.)

== History ==
WYO 410 was established in June 1971.

== Major intersections ==
The entire route is in Uinta County.

Location	mi	km	Destinations	Notes
	0.00	0.00	CR 204 – Piedmont	Continuation beyond southern terminus
	0.00	0.00	End of pavement	Southern terminus
	1.16	1.87	Bridge over Blacks Fork	
	3.18	5.12	Bridge over Willow Creek	
	3.71	5.97	Bridge over Smiths Fork	
	12.28	19.76	WYO 411 west – Millburne	T intersection; eastern end of WYO 411
	12.47	20.07	Bridge over Smiths Fork	
Mountain View	13.36	21.50	WYO 414 north – Urie, Lyman, I-80 & WYO 412 WYO 414 south – Lonetree, McKinnon	Northern terminus; T intersection
1.000 mi = 1.609 km; 1.000 km = 0.621 mi

== See also ==
- List of state highways in Wyoming
