= Interstate 80 Business (Fort Bridger–Lyman, Wyoming) =

Interstate highway business loop in Uinta County, Wyoming, United States

Interstate 80 Business
- I-80 BL highlighted in red

Route information
- Business route of I-80
- Maintained by WYDOT
- Length: 16.67 mi (26.83 km)

Major junctions
- West end: I-80 northwest of Fort Bridger
- WYO 414 in Urie; WYO 413 in Lyman
- East end: I-80 northeast of Lyman

Location
- Country: United States
- State: Wyoming
- Counties: Uinta

Highway system
- Interstate Highway System; Main; Auxiliary; Suffixed; Business; Future; Wyoming State Highway System; Interstate; US; State

Interstate 80 Business (I-80 Bus) is a 15.63-mile (25.15 km) southern business loop of Interstate 80 (I-80) through Fort Bridger and Lyman in eastern Uinta County, Wyoming, United States.

== Route description ==
I-80 Bus begins at the Fort Bridger interchange on I-80 (exit 34), a diamond interchange. (I-80 heads east toward Lyman and west toward US Highway 189 (US 189), Evanston, and Salt Lake City, Utah. In addition, from the north side of the interchange, Uinta County Road 220 (CR 220) heads westerly.) From its western terminus, I-80 Bus (initially with divided lanes, but quickly becoming a two-lane road) heads southeasterly for about 1.6 miles (2.6 km) to cross Blacks Fork (of the Green River) and immediately enters the census-designated place of Fort Bridger.

Within Fort Bridger, I-80 Bus widens to a three-lane road (with a center turn lane) and crosses over Little Blacks Fork and Groshon Creek before passing just north of the Fort Bridger State Historic Site. Promptly thereafter, I-80 Bus crosses Main Street and connects with the west end of Carter Avenue and the north end of Manley Street. After crossing Hamilton Street, I-80 Bus reaches a junction with the north end of CR 219 (Cemetery Road) and the south end CR 224 at the last intersection in the community. (CR 219 heads south past the Fort Bridger Cemetery before ending at Wyoming Highway 411 (WYO 411).) I-80 Bus then curves to head due east, leaves Fort Bridger, and quickly narrows back to a two-lane road.

Just under one mile (1.6 km) east of Fort Bridger, I-80 Bus connects with the south end of CR 229 at a T intersection. (CR 229 heads northeasterly to end at WYO 414.) I-80 Bus then briefly gains an eastbound climbing lane and crosses over the Blacks Fork Canal (also known as the Lyman Canal), before losing the climbing lane and entering the census-designated place of Urie, about 1.3 miles (2.1 km) after the junction with CR 229. Within Urie, the route crosses WYO 414 at I-80 Bus's only intersection in the community. (WYO 414 heads north through the extreme western edge of Lyman to end at the Carter–Mountain View interchange on I-80; WYO 412 heads northwesterly from that interchange towar Carter. WYO 414 heads south through Mountain View, Lonetree, and McKinnon before ending at the Utah State Line.) Within Urie, I-80 Bus briefly widens again to a three-lane road before narrowing again.

Continuing due east for about one mile (1.6 km), I-80 Bus connects with the north end of CR 241 a four-way intersection. (The road heading north ends shortly at a ranch house. CR 241 heads due south to end WYO 414 on the eastern edge of Mountain View at a junction with the north end of CR 269.) I-80 Bus connects with the south end of CR 239 at a T intersection 0.5 miles (0.80 km) farther east. (CR 239 heads north to end in Lyman.) Approximately 0.3 miles (0.48 km) later, I-80 Bus begins a 0.6-mile (0.97 km) curve to the north. I-80 Bus then crosses CR 243, just after beginning its curve to the north. (CR 243 heads due north to end in Lyman and due south as Taylor Lane to end at WYO 414.) Shortly thereafter, I-80 Bus previously had a junction with the west end CR 254 at a T intersection. However, the west end of CR 254 was realigned to connect with CR 243 and the section of road connecting I-80 Bus with CR 254 was removed. (Some maps still show this former connection.)

As I-80 Bus nears the end of its curve to the north, it enters Lyman as South Main Street and connects with the west ends of Conner's Way and Franklin Street. At the end of I-80 Bus's curve to the north, it crosses Canal Street, widens to four lanes, and crosses Willow, Lincoln, Sage, and Owen streets. (The Lyman Town Hall is located on the northwest corner of South Main and Sage streets and the Lyman Post Office is located on the southwest corner of Main and Owen streets.) Continuing north along North Main Street and passing by the west side of Lyman Intermediate School, I-80 Bus connects with west end of West Pine Street before crossing Walnut and Blackner streets. At the north end of North Main Street, I-80 Bus turns sharply to head east along the four-lane East Carter Street (with West Carter Street continuing west) and connects with the south end of WYO 413 in the middle of the turn. (WYO 413 heads briefly west before leaving Lyman and turning north to end at the North Lyman Interchange on I-80.)

Continuing east along East Clark Street, I-80 Bus connects with the south end of Bradshaw Street, the north ends of North Franklin and North East streets. I-80 Bus then connects with the west end of Village Drive (which loops to the north) before connecting with the south ends of Birch and Cottonwood streets and narrowing back to a two-lane road. After connecting with the south ends of Dogwood Street, Elm Avenue, and Fir Street, I-80 Bus connects with the east end of Village Drive. Promptly thereafter, I-80 Bus crosses CR 251 and connects with the north end of Heritage Cove, before passing by the south side of Lyman High School and leaving Lyman.

Just after leaving Lyman, I-80 Bus curves to head northeasterly. As it begins that curve, I-80 Bus connects with the west end of CR 256, followed by the south end of Nubbs Road, both at T intersections. About 0.7 miles (1.1 km) farther northeast, I-80 Bus connects with the north end of CR 255 and the south end of CR 256. Roughly 0.6 miles (0.97 km) later, I-80 Bus connects with the west end of CR 252 and then the south end of CR 233, approximately 0.4 miles (0.64 km) after that. (CR 233 heads northeasterly to pass under I-80 and continue on toward Granger.) About 2.4 miles (3.9 km) farther northeast, I-80 Bus cross over Smiths Fork, before connecting with the west end of CR 26 about 0.5 miles (0.80 km) later and then the north end of CR 91 approximately 0.4 miles (0.64 km) after that. Roughly 0.7 miles (1.1 km) northeast of its final junction with a county road, I-80 Bus reaches its eastern terminus at the Bridger Valley interchange on I-80 (exit 48), a diamond interchange. (I-80 heads east toward US 30, Little America, and Rock Springs and west toward Fort Bridger. In addition, from the north side of the interchange, CR 237 heads northerly.)

== Major intersections ==
The entire route is in Uinta County.

Location	mi	km	Destinations	Notes
	0.00– 0.48	0.00– 0.77	CR 220	Continuation beyond western end
	0.00– 0.48	0.00– 0.77	I-80 – Evanston, Green River	I-80 exit 34
Fort Bridger	2.57	4.14	Fort Bridger State Historic Site	
Urie	5.08	8.18	WYO 414 – Mountain View, Carter	
Lyman	8.14	13.10	WYO 413 north to I-80	
	15.60– 16.67	25.11– 26.83	I-80 – Green River, Evanston	I-80 exit 48
	15.60– 16.67	25.11– 26.83	CR 237	Continuation beyond eastern end
1.000 mi = 1.609 km; 1.000 km = 0.621 mi

== See also ==
- List of business routes of the Interstate Highway System
- Business routes of Interstate 80
