= Bridger Valley, Wyoming =

Valley in Wyoming, United States

Coordinates: 41°17′N 110°20′W

Bridger Valley is a landform of Uinta County, Wyoming, United States, where Fort Bridger was established in 1843 to service emigrant traffic. For the next century, the region served as a crossroads for the "California/Oregon Trail, the Mormon Trail, the Pony Express Route, the Transcontinental Railroad, and the Lincoln Highway. Today, the valley is a historic byway, incorporating the small towns of Fort Bridger, Urie, Mountain View, and Lyman". Bridger Valley Historic Byway is an approximately 20 miles (32 km) loop showcasing some of Wyoming's most treasured historical sites.

Bridger Valley would include the towns of Millburne and Robertson, in addition to the towns mentioned above, in Bridger Valley. Towns in the vicinity of Bridger Valley include Carter, Lonetree, and the ghost town of Piedmont. Bridger Valley is 38 miles (61 km) east of Evanston.
