= Wyoming Highway 413 =

State highway in Uinta County, Wyoming, United States

Wyoming Highway 413
- WYO 413 highlighted in red

Route information
- Maintained by Wyoming Department of Transportation
- Length: 2.73 mi (4.39 km)

Major junctions
- South end: I-80 BL in Lyman
- North end: I-80 north of Lyman

Location
- Country: United States
- State: Wyoming
- Counties: Uinta

Highway system
- Wyoming State Highway System; Interstate; US; State
← WYO 412	→ WYO 414

Wyoming Highway 413 (WYO 413) is a 2.73-mile (4.39 km) state highway in eastern Uinta County. Wyoming, United States. That connects Interstate 80 Business Loop (I-80 BL) in Lyman with Interstate 80 (I-80).

== Route description ==
WYO 413 begins at a T intersection with Interstate 80 Business Loop (I-80 BL) at the intersection of (the north end of) North Main Street and East Clark Street, just inside the northern edge of Lyman. (I-80 BL heads east along East Clark Street to end at I-80 and west to pass through Urie and Fort Bridger, before ending at I-80.) From its southern terminus WYO 413 heads very briefly northwest to leave Lyman and connect with the west end of Cemetery Road. After turning briefly west, WYO 413 begins a 0.3-mile (0.48 km) curve to the north. Near the end of the curve, WYO 413 connects with the south end of Uinta County Road 247 at a T intersection.

After heading northerly for about one-half mile (0.80 km), WYO 413 connects with the west end of Uinta County Road 234 (CR 234) at a four-way intersection. (Hegal Road heads east from the intersection, while CR 234 heads west along Rollins Road to end at a junction with Wyoming Highway 414 and Uinta County Road 229.) Continuing nearly due north for approximately 0.7 miles (1.1 km) WYO 413 reaches its junction with the west end of Uinta County Road 236 at a T intersection; and then west end of Uinta County Road 238 at another T intersection about one-half mile (0.80 km) later.

WYO 413 then crosses over Blacks Fork before connecting with the access road to the Lyman Rest Stop, roughly 0.2 miles (0.32 km) later. (Lyman Rest Stop is a rest area along both directions of I-80 that is entered via WYO 413.) Just north of the rest area access road, WYO 413 reaches its northern terminus at the North Lyman Interchange on I-80 (Exit 41), a diamond interchange. (I-80 heads east toward U.S. Route 30, Little America, and Rock Springs. I-80 heads west toward U.S. Route 189, Evanston, and Salt Lake City, Utah. In addition, from the north side of the interchange, Uinta County Road 231 heads northwesterly toward Carter, but ends at Wyoming Highway 412.)

== Major intersections ==
The entire route is in Uinta County.

Location	mi	km	Destinations	Notes
Lyman	0.00	0.00	I-80 BL east (East Clark Street) – I-80, Little America, Rock Springs I-80 BL west (North Main Street) – Urie, Fort Bridger, I-80, Evanston	Southern terminus; T intersection
	1.01	1.63	Hegal Road east CR 234 west (Rollins Road) – WYO 414 & CR 247	
	2.32	3.73	Bridge over Blacks Fork	
	2.67– 2.73	4.30– 4.39	I-80 east (Dwight D. Eisenhower Highway) – US 30, Little America, Rock Springs I-80 west (Dwight D. Eisenhower Highway) – Fort Bridger, US 189, Evanston, Salt Lake City (Utah)	Northern terminus; Diamond interchange; Interstate 80 Exit 41
	2.73	4.39	CR 231 north – WYO 412, Carter	Continuation north beyond northern terminus
1.000 mi = 1.609 km; 1.000 km = 0.621 mi

== See also ==
- List of state highways in Wyoming
