= Wyoming Highway 414 =

State highway in Wyoming, United States

Wyoming Highway 414
- WYO 414 highlighted in red

Route information
- Maintained by WYDOT
- Length: 46.12 mi (74.22 km)
- Existed: June 1971–present

Major junctions
- South end: SR-43 at the Utah state line southeast of McKinnon
- North end: I-80 / WYO 412 northwest of Lyman

Location
- Country: United States
- State: Wyoming
- Counties: Uinta, Sweetwater

Highway system
- Wyoming State Highway System; Interstate; US; State
← WYO 413	→ WYO 430

Wyoming Highway 414 (WYO 414) is a 46.12-mile-long (74.22 km) state highway in eastern Uinta and extreme southwestern Sweetwater counties in the U.S. state of Wyoming. Although primarily a north–south highway, WYO 414 travels in a more east–west orientation near its southern end. It connects Utah State Route 43 (UT-43) at the Utah state line, southeast of McKinnon with Interstate 80 (I-80) and WYO 412, at a point northwest of Lyman.

== Route description ==
Wyoming Highway 414 begins at the Utah State Line at Utah State Route 43. Utah State Route 43 connects Wyoming Highways 414 and 530 at each routes respective terminus, intersecting Utah SR 44 in between. SR 43 enters from the south becoming Highway 414 as the highway enters Sweetwater County. WYO 414 turns west, passing through the small community of McKinnon before entering Uinta County. Still traveling west, Highway 414 then reaches Lonetree as it turns north toward Mountain View. Nearing 40 miles into the route, WYO 414 turns west again and enters the town of Mountain View from the east. Wyoming Highway 410 (2nd Street) is intersected in town and provides travel to Robertson and other outlying areas. Highway 414 now will travel due north for the remainder of its routing. Interstate 80 Business is intersected at just over 3 miles later in Urie, just east of Fort Bridger and west of Lyman. Past Urie, WYO 414 reaches its end at exit 39 of Interstate 80 and the southern terminus of Wyoming Highway 412. The roadway continues north as WYO 412 to US 189

Signs along eastbound Interstate 80 promote Wyoming Highway 414 as a route to the Flaming Gorge National Recreation Area.

== History ==
Wyoming Highway 414 was formerly designated in Crook County along present-day U.S. Route 212 in the northeastern corner of the state between 1936 and 1939. However that designation was replaced by US 212 when that route was extended into Wyoming and Montana from its prior end in Belle Fourche, South Dakota.

== Major intersections ==
County	Location	mi	km	Destinations	Notes
Sweetwater		0.00	0.00	SR-43	Continuation beyond Utah state line
Uinta	Mountain View	40.1	64.5	WYO 410	Eastern terminus of WYO 410
Uinta	Urie	43.3	69.7	I-80 BL	
Uinta		46.12	74.22	I-80	Exit 39 on I-80
Uinta		46.12	74.22	WYO 412 north	Continuation beyond northern terminus; southern terminus of WYO 412
1.000 mi = 1.609 km; 1.000 km = 0.621 mi
