= Wyoming Highway 411 =

State highway in Uinta County, Wyoming, United States

Wyoming Highway 411
- Millburne Road
- WYO 411 highlighted in red

Route information
- Maintained by Wyoming Department of Transportation
- Length: 3.97 mi (6.39 km)

Major junctions
- West end: CR 260 in Millburne
- East end: WYO 410 southwest of Mountain View

Location
- Country: United States
- State: Wyoming
- Counties: Uinta

Highway system
- Wyoming State Highway System; Interstate; US; State
← WYO 410	→ WYO 412

Wyoming Highway 411 (WYO 411), also known as Millburne Road, is a 3.97-mile (6.39 km) state highway in central Uinta County, Wyoming, United States, that connects the unincorporated community of Millburne with Wyoming Highway 410 (WYO 411), southwest of Mountain View.

== Route description ==
WYO 411 begins at the eastern end of Uinta County Road 260 (CR 260) in southern Millburne, just west of Blacks Fork. (CR 260 heads southwesterly to connect with Uinta County Road 261 before ending at a ranch house.) From its western terminus, WYO 411 heads north for about 0.4 miles (0.64 km) before connecting with the west end of Main Street. Shortly thereafter WYO 411 turns to head east. In the middle of its curve, WYO 411 has a junction with Uinta County Road 217 (CR 217) at a T intersection. (CR 217 heads north, past the Millburne Cemetery, then east to end at Uinta County Road 219 [CR 219] on the southeast corner of the Fort Bridger Cemetery.) After connecting with the north end of Mill Avenue and crossing Blacks Fork, WYO 411 continues east for about 0.7 miles (1.1 km) before briefly turning southeast. Along this short southeast section, WYO 411 connects with the south end of CR 219 at T intersection, crosses the Blacks Fork Canal (also known as Lyman Canal), and then connects with the north end of Uinta County Road 263 (CR 263), at another T intersection. (CR 219 head north to Fort Bridger and CR 263 heads south to Robertson.) WYO 411 then curves again to resume its eastern course. After about 4 miles (6.4 km) of heading due east, and crossing over Smiths Fork, WYO 411 reaches its eastern terminus at a T intersection with WYO 410, just west of the north end of Tipperary Bench and southwest of Mountain View. (WYO 410 heads north, then east to end at Wyoming Highway 414 in Mountain View and south to end at a county road west of Robertson.) For its length, WYO 411 is a two-lane road.

== Major intersections ==
The entire route is in Uinta County.

Location	mi	km	Destinations	Notes
Millburne	0.00	0.00	CR 260 west	Western terminus
	0.74	1.19	Bridge over Blacks Fork	
	1.65	2.66	Bridge over Blacks Fork Canal	
	3.60	5.79	Bridge over Smiths Fork	
	3.97	6.39	WYO 410 north – Mountain View WYO 410 south – Robertson	Eastern terminus
1.000 mi = 1.609 km; 1.000 km = 0.621 mi

== See also ==
- List of state highways in Wyoming
