= Wyoming Highway 412 =

State highway in Uinta and Lincoln counties in Wyoming, United States

Wyoming Highway 412
- Carter-Lyman Road
- WYO 412 highlighted in red

Route information
- Maintained by Wyoming Department of Transportation
- Length: 24.73 mi (39.80 km)
- Existed: June 1971–present

Major junctions
- South end: I-80 / WYO 414 north of Lyman
- North end: US 189 south of Kemmerer

Location
- Country: United States
- State: Wyoming
- Counties: Uinta, Lincoln

Highway system
- Wyoming State Highway System; Interstate; US; State
| ← WYO 411 | → WYO 413 |

Wyoming Highway 412 (WYO 412), also known as the Carter–Lyman Road and previously as the Carter Cutoff Road, is a 24.73-mile (39.80 km) state highway in Uinta and Lincoln counties in western Wyoming, United States, that connects Interstate 80 (I-80/Dwight D. Eisenhower Highway), northwest of Lyman, with U.S. Route 189 (US 189), south of Kemmerer.

== Route description ==
WYO 412 begins at a diamond interchange on Interstate 80 in northeastern Uinta County, northwest of Lyman. The route is a continuation of WYO 414, which proceeds southward through Urie and Mountain View. From I-80, WYO 412 proceeds in a northwestward direction, passing the Fort Bridger Airport. After about 8 miles (13 km), it reaches the community of Carter, where it crosses a Union Pacific rail line. From there, it proceeds another 14 miles (23 km) northwest, crossing into Lincoln County before ending at U.S. Highway 189.

== History ==
WYO 410 was established in June 1971.

== Major intersections ==
| County | Location | mi | km | Destinations | Notes |
|---|---|---|---|---|---|
| Uinta | | 0.00 | 0.00 | WYO 414 south / California National Historic Trail / Oregon National Historic Trail – Mountain View | Continuation south beyond southern terminus; Northern end of WYO 414 |
| Uinta | | 0.00– 0.08 | 0.00– 0.13 | I-80 (Dwight D. Eisenhower Highway) – Evanston, Green River | Southern terminus; Diamond interchange; Interstate 80 Exit 39 |
| Lincoln | | 24.73 | 39.80 | US 189 / California National Historic Trail / Oregon National Historic Trail – Kemmerer, Evanston | Northern terminus |
1.000 mi = 1.609 km; 1.000 km = 0.621 mi

== See also ==
- List of state highways in Wyoming
