= Fort Supply (Utah Territory) =

Former fort and settlement in Bridger Valley, Wyoming

- Ghost town
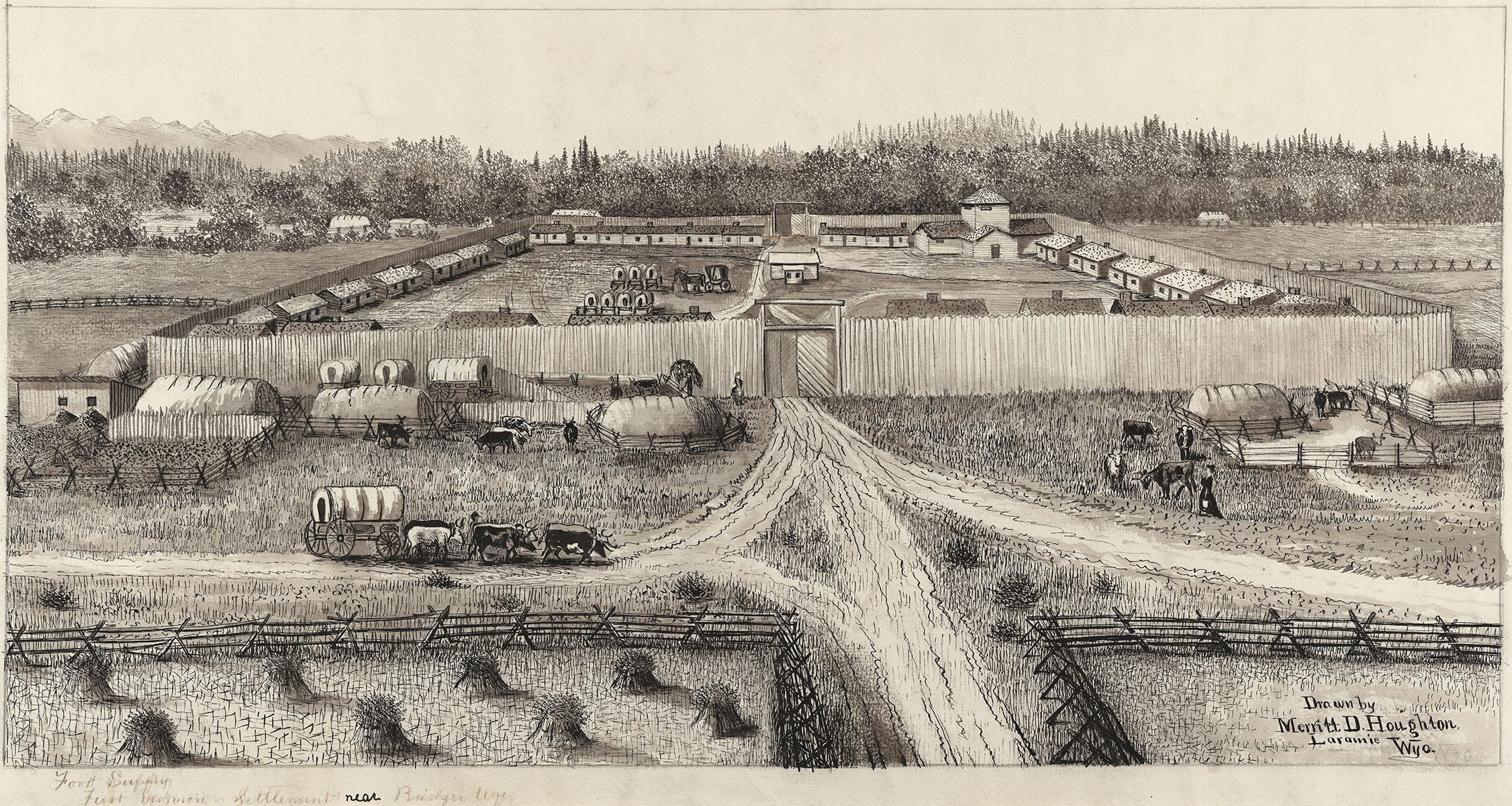
- A conjectural sketch of Fort Supply

- Location within the state of Wyoming Fort Supply (the United States)
- Coordinates: 41.16697°N 110.43778°W
- Country: United States
- State: Wyoming
- County: Uinta
- Settled: 1853
- Elevation: 7,420 ft (2,260 m)

Fort Supply was a Mormon pioneer-era fort in Green River County, Utah Territory, United States. Established in 1853 and abandoned during the Utah War of 1857, the fort served to solidify Mormon influence and control in the area, as a base for local missionary efforts, and to supply food and other provisions for pioneers headed to Salt Lake City. The site of the former fort is located near the modern-day community of Robertson, Uinta County, Wyoming, and a monument commemorating the settlement is maintained as a satellite site of Wyoming's Fort Bridger State Historic Site.

== History ==
=== Bridger Valley before Fort Supply ===
What is presently known as the Bridger Valley (also called the Green River Valley) had become a popular gathering place for Native Americans and mountain men in the first half of the nineteenth century. Two of these mountain men, Jim Bridger and his business partner Louis Vasquez, established Fort Bridger as a trading post in the valley during the early 1840s. Several years later, Mormon pioneers (members of the Church of Jesus Christ of Latter-day Saints, or LDS Church) established Salt Lake City approximately 100 miles (160 km) to the south-west of Fort Bridger, and this new city became the principal settlement in the Utah Territory following the territory's establishment by the US Congress in 1850.

An act passed by the Utah Territorial legislature gave themselves the right to control the operation of ferries on the Green River, near the Bridger Valley. These ferries had been operated by mountain men, who opposed giving up control to the Mormon men authorized by the legislature to run them. Fort Bridger also saw its trading business decline as Salt Lake City grew. Both of these factors led to contention between the groups, with Mormons claiming that the mountain men were trying to incite the local natives against them.

Elsewhere in the Utah Territory, relations with the natives deteriorated, and by the summer of 1853 the Walker War had begun. Trade with all natives in the Utah Territory was then outlawed, including in the Bridger Valley. At Fort Bridger the now illegal trade continued, and in August 1853, 150 men under the command of Sheriff James Ferguson were sent to stop it. When the group arrived at Fort Bridger, James Bridger had fled, but they discovered his whiskey and rum and destroyed it. Afterwards they continued to the Green River, where they engaged the mountain men who had been unlawfully running ferries, killing some and seizing their livestock. Afterwards they returned to Fort Bridger, which they temporarily occupied. To help maintain the control that had been established during these skirmishes, the decision was made by church leaders to establish a permanent presence in the area.

=== Green River Mission ===
Approximate locations of Fort Supply, Salt Lake City, and Fillmore (the territorial capital 1851–1856). The Utah Territory is shown in blue, with modern state boundaries shown for reference.

==== First Attempt ====
Church leadership in Salt Lake City called Orson Hyde to organize the effort to establish the “Green River Mission” and build a fort in the Bridger Valley. The goal of this mission would not only be to convert and “civilize” the local Shoshone, but to help maintain Mormon control in the area, and supply provisions to pioneers who still had a nearly 100-mile journey across the Wasatch Range to the Salt Lake Valley.

During the church's general conference in October 1853, 39 young men were called to the mission. The first company of men, led by John Nebeker, left Salt Lake City for the Bridger Valley on November 2, 1853. The remaining men left Salt Lake City on November 25 in a second company led by Isaac Bullock. By the time the second company arrived in the valley, the first company had already chosen a site for the fort (approximately 11 miles (18 km) miles from Fort Bridger), and construction on a blockhouse was quickly started. After about two weeks the blockhouse was finished, but little else could be done until the following spring, as winter had already set in. Many of the missionaries’ efforts were spent that first winter surviving off supplies from Salt Lake City and learning the Shoshoni language from Elijah B. Ward (a mountain man who had recently converted to Mormonism) and his native wife Sally.

When spring arrived, a group of missionaries made contact with the local Shoshone, including Chief Washakie's band, although little was accomplished and none of the Shoshone were baptized into the church. Also in the spring, missionaries planted crops and continued work on the fort. As the year progressed, some missionaries became discontent and began to leave for Salt Lake City without permission. By July 1854 the fort and mission had largely been abandoned, save for a small group who stayed behind to harvest the crops.

==== Second Attempt ====
During the church's general conference in April 1855, new missionaries were called to reoccupy the fort and continue the mission. This group, led by James S. Brown, arrived at the fort in May 1855 and got to work repairing the fort and planting crops. They also restarted the mission to the Shoshone, and had some success converting natives. Also during 1855 the church purchased Fort Bridger, and Lewis Robinson was given charge over it.

The 1855 crop did well, until an early frost in September destroyed most of what had not yet been harvested, and food had to be carefully budgeted that winter. In 1856, church leadership called 43 families from other settlements in the territory to join with the missionaries currently at Fort Supply and strengthen that community. Around this time leaders at Fort Supply had received permission to establish a city. A site for what would become “Supply City” was chosen approximately 3 miles (4.8 km) north of the fort and the city plot was surveyed in June 1857; 15 or 16 homes in the new city had been constructed by the end of that summer.

=== Utah War and abandonment ===
During 1857, in an event known as the Utah War, President James Buchanan had Brigham Young replaced as governor of the territory. Buchanan also ordered 2,500 troops to accompany Alfred Cumming, the new governor, to Utah. As this federal force approached the territory, Young declared martial law and instructed that no federal troops were to pass any closer than Fort Bridger and Fort Supply. By fall 1857, the families and most missionaries at Fort Supply and Supply City were recalled. The Utah militia, on the other hand, headed in the opposite direction towards the Bridger Valley. The militia, and a few remaining men from the settlements, were instructed to implement a scorched-earth policy and burn anything the approaching army could use. Fort Supply was burned around midnight on October 3, 1857, after which the group moved on to Supply City and burnt it.

As the Utah War ended, some settlers desired to return to the sites of Fort Supply and Supply City, but the land had been made part of the military reserve when Fort Bridger became an official US military post. They requested help from Governor Cumming, who was sympathetic, but John B. Floyd, the US Secretary of War, would not allow it. Mormons did not return to the valley until the 1890s, when the military reserve was dissolved and the land opened for homesteading. This new group of Mormons largely settled in what is today Lyman, Wyoming.

== Description of the fort ==
The first building constructed at the fort was the blockhouse, which included four log wings, attached at the corners. This created a center room that was built two stories high, so that a guard could be placed on the second level. By April 1856, the fort included a stockade that enclosed 10 acres (4.0 ha), 25 homes, and a two-story building used as a courthouse and for other public functions. Also included were numerous corrals, stockyards, and fenced fields. At the time the fort was burnt, Jesse W. Crosby (present at the burning) indicated that 100 or more log houses, a sawmill, gristmill, and thrashing machine were located at the settlements.

== Site preservation ==
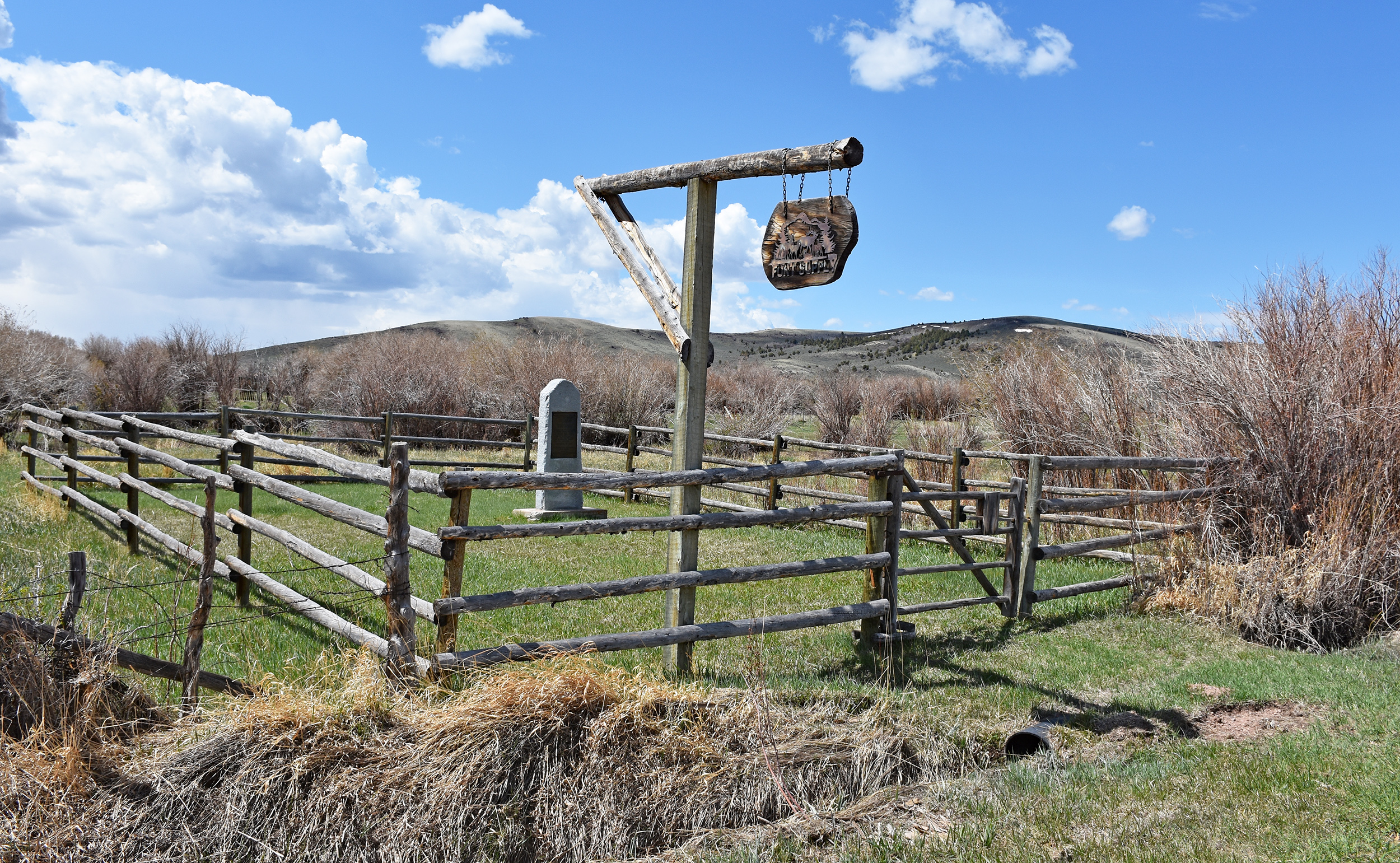
Monument at the former site of Fort Supply

The former site of Fort Supply was homestead by John C. Bond, who received the land patent in 1902. Assistant Church Historian, Andrew Jenson, positively identified the fort site in August 1920.

As part of Wyoming's golden anniversary of statehood, the Historical Landmark Commission of Wyoming dedicated a monument—dated 1937—at the site on July 3, 1940. The monument is maintained as a satellite site of Fort Bridger State Historic Site, and can be visited during the summer months when roads are passable.

== See also ==
- Fort Lemhi
- Old Las Vegas Mormon Fort - another Mormon fort with a similar purpose
- Mormon corridor
- History of Wyoming
