= Verne A. Taylor =

Wyoming politician

Member of the Wyoming House of Representatives
- In office 1941–1941

Verne A. Taylor was an American politician from Uinta County, Wyoming. She served in the Wyoming House of Representatives in 1941.
