= Uinta County School District Number 4 =

School district in Wyoming

Coordinates: 41°16′15″N 110°20′22″W

Uinta County School District #4 is a public school district based in Mountain View, Wyoming, United States.

== Geography ==
Uinta County School District #4 serves central and southeastern Uinta County, including the following communities:

- Incorporated places
  - Town of Mountain View
- Census-designated places (Note: All census-designated places are unincorporated.)
  - Carter
  - Fort Bridger
  - Lonetree
  - Robertson

== Schools ==
- Mountain View High School (Grades 9-12)
- Mountain View K-8 School (Grades K-8)

== Student demographics ==
The following figures are as of October 1, 2008.

- Total District Enrollment: 730
- Student enrollment by gender
  - Male: 385 (52.74%)
  - Female: 345 (47.26%)
- Student enrollment by ethnicity
  - White (not Hispanic): 714 (97.81%)
  - Hispanic: 8 (1.10%)
  - American Indian or Alaskan Native: 5 (0.68%)
  - Black (not Hispanic): 2 (0.27%)
  - Asian or Pacific Islander: 1 (0.14%)

== See also ==
- List of school districts in Wyoming
