= Mountain View High School (Wyoming) =

Coordinates: 41°16′28″N 110°19′54″W

- Mountain View, Wyoming 82939; United States

Information
- School type: Public
- Motto: "An education second to none"
- School district: Uinta County School District #4
- Superintendent: Jeff Newton
- School number: Uinta County 4
- Principal: Ben Carr
- Grades: 9–12
- Age range: 14-18
- Hours in school day: 8
- Campus size: Large, one plot of land
- Colors: Purple, white, and black
- Slogan: "An education second to none"
- Athletics: Cross country, football, volleyball, basketball, wrestling, track and field, indoor track, soccer, cheerleading, art underground, photography underground.
- Mascot: Bison
- Nickname: Buffs
- Team name: Buffalos
- Rival: Lyman Eagles
- Accreditation: Through State of Wyoming
- Feeder schools: Mountain View Middle School
- Graduates: Around 50 students per year
- Website: www.u4wy.org

Mountain View High School is a public high school in Mountain View, Wyoming, United States. It is part of Uinta County School District #4 and serves students in grades nine through twelve. The school's mascot is the Buffalo and their chief athletic rivals are the Lyman Eagles.

Mountain View High School serves the town of Mountain View and the Census-designated places of Carter, Fort Bridger, Lonetree, Robertson, and Urie.
