= Piedmont Charcoal Kilns State Historic Site =

Historic site in Piedmont, Wyoming, United States

- Piedmont Charcoal Kilns
- U.S. National Register of Historic Places
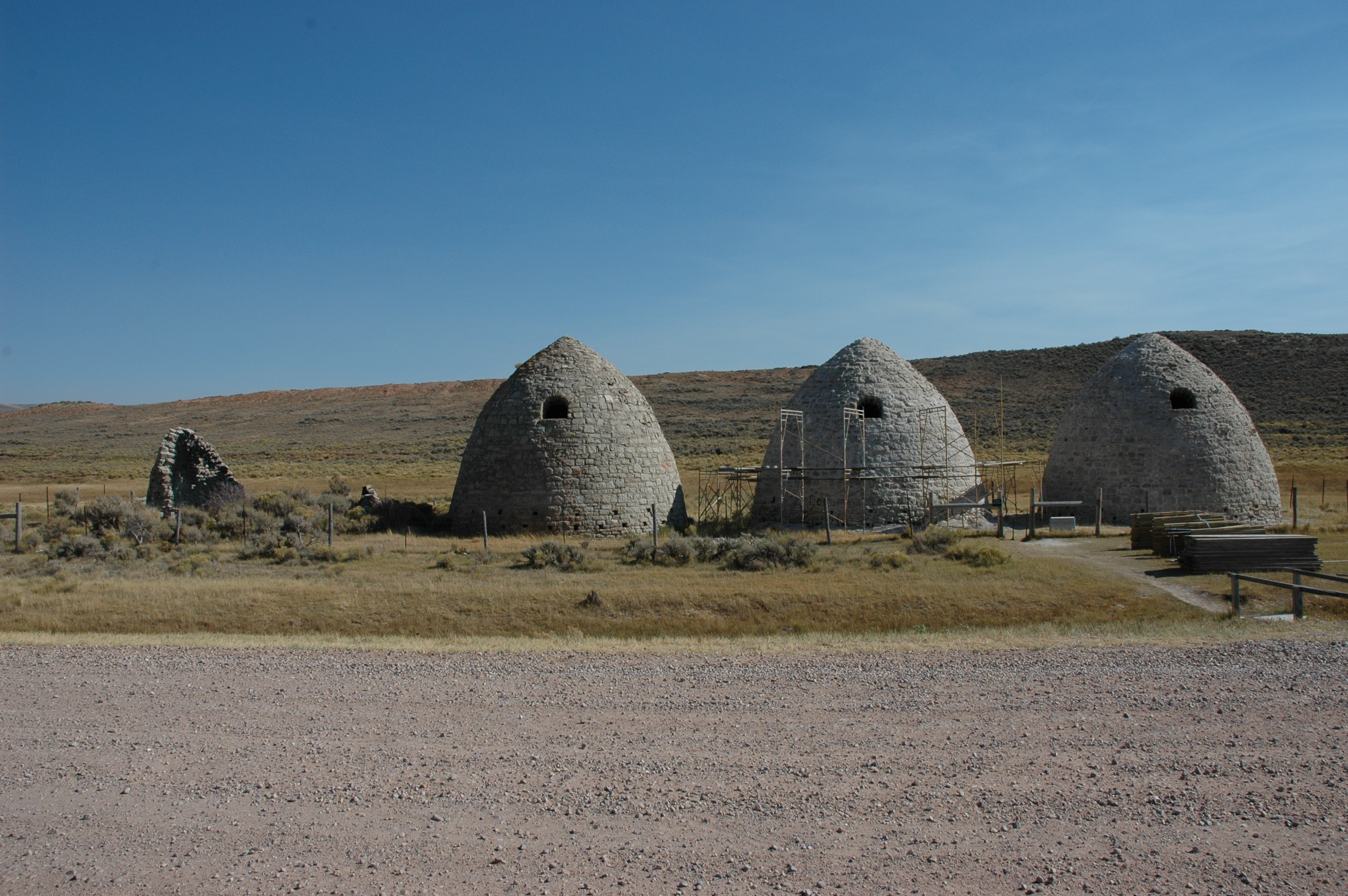
- The three intact kilns and one mostly-destroyed one undergoing restoration, October 2010

- Location within Wyoming Location within the United States
- Nearest city: Fort Bridger, Wyoming
- Coordinates: 41°13′11″N 110°37′7″W
- Area: Less than one acre
- Built: 1869
- Architect: Byrne, Moses
- NRHP reference No.: 71000894
- Added to NRHP: June 03, 1971

The Piedmont Charcoal Kilns in the ghost town of Piedmont, Wyoming, United States, are a remnant of a once-extensive charcoal-making industry in southwestern Wyoming.

== Description ==
The kilns were built by Moses Byrne around 1869 near the Piedmont Station along the Union Pacific Railroad. The three surviving beehive-shaped kilns were built of local sandstone about 30 feet (9.1 m) in circumference and about 30 feet (9.1 m) high, with 24-inch-thick (61 cm) walls. A granite marker reads:

Charcoal Kilns were built by Moses Byrne, 1869, to supply the pioneer smelters in the Utah Valley.

== History ==
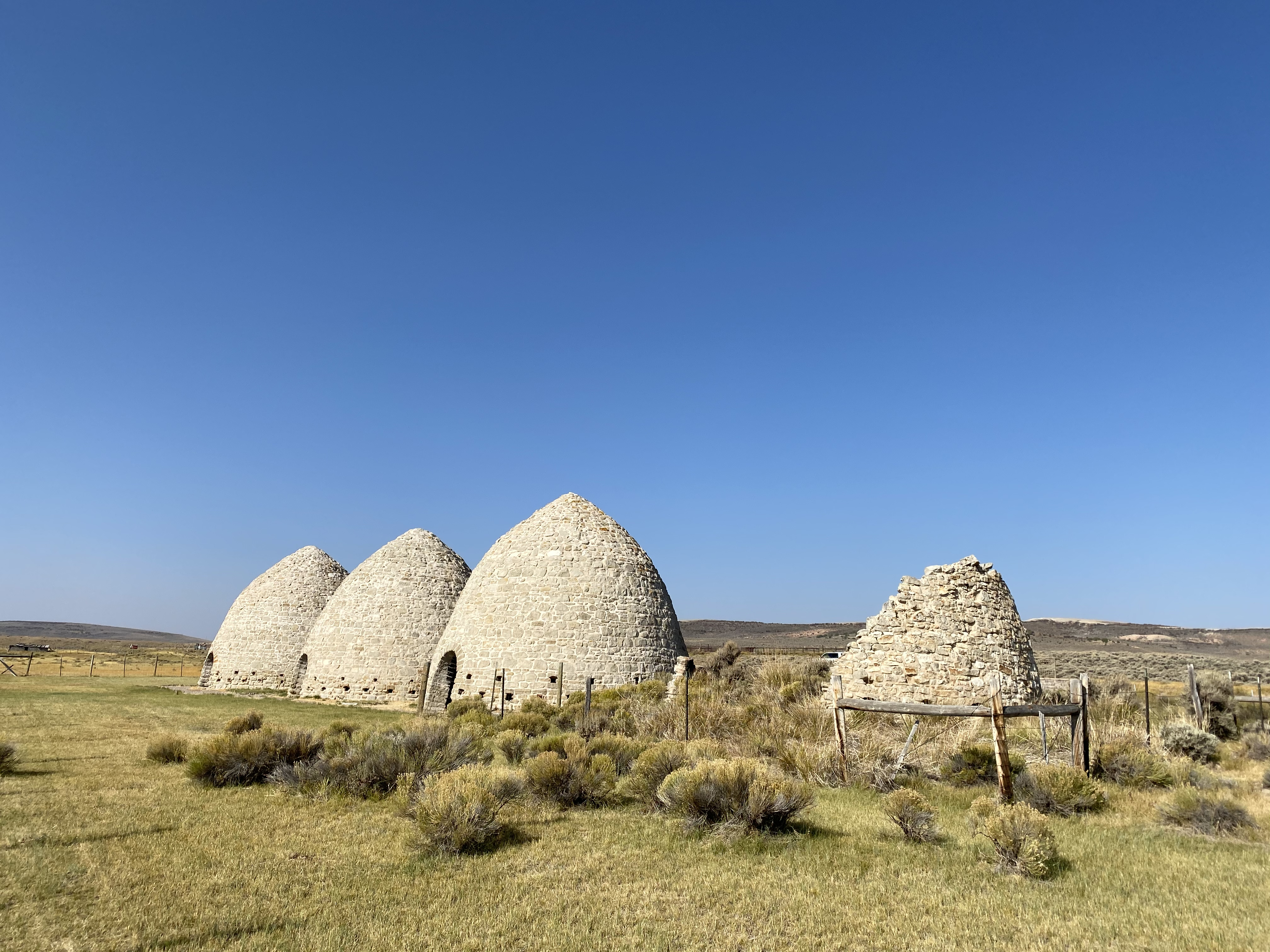
South face of kilns, September 2020

Moses Byrne settled in Piedmont about 1867. A builder, Byrne had built a number of Pony Express stations and stables. Byrne built five kilns at Piedmont in 1869. Most of Byrne's charcoal was shipped to the Salt Lake Valley (the area around Salt Lake City then known as the Utah Valley, but north of the valley currently known as the Utah Valley) for use in small smelters and blacksmith shops. Two kilns have since been destroyed. Piedmont itself is a ghost town.

The Piedmont Charcoal Kilns were listed on the National Register of Historic Places in 1971. They are managed by the state of Wyoming as Piedmont Charcoal Kilns State Historic Site.

== See also ==
- National Register of Historic Places listings in Uinta County, Wyoming
- Wyoming Historical Landmarks
- List of the oldest buildings in Wyoming
