= Millburne, Wyoming =

- Unincorporated community
- Location within the state of Wyoming Location within the United States
- Coordinates: 41°15′30″N 110°24′46″W
- Country: United States
- State: Wyoming
- County: Uinta
- Elevation: 6,966 ft (2,123 m)
- Time zone: UTC-7 (Mountain (MST))
  - Summer (DST): UTC-6 (MDT)
- ZIP codes: 82933
- Area code: 307
- GNIS feature ID: 1597408

Millburne is an unincorporated community along the Blacks Fork river in central Uinta County, Wyoming, United States.

== History ==
In the mid-1800s, a Mormon supply station was located near Millburne. In 1914, prominent educator James W. Fisher moved to Millburne and taught school there. In the 1930 Census, the population of the Millburne district was 149. It rose to 160 by the 1940 census.

== Geography ==
The community is located just northeast of the northeastern edge of Nebraska Flat at the west end of Wyoming Highway 411, which heads east for about 4 miles (6.4 km) to end at the town of Mountain View. The roadway continues south from Millburne as Uinta County Road 260. The Blacks Fork river flows through Millburn, and its waters are of the calcium bicarbonate type, with good quality. The Blacks Fork River Lodge is located in Millburne. The Millburne Cemetery is located along Uinta County Road 217, about one mile (1.6 km) north of the main part of the community.

== See also ==
- List of unincorporated communities in Wyoming
