= 1900 United States presidential election in Wyoming =

- November 6, 1900
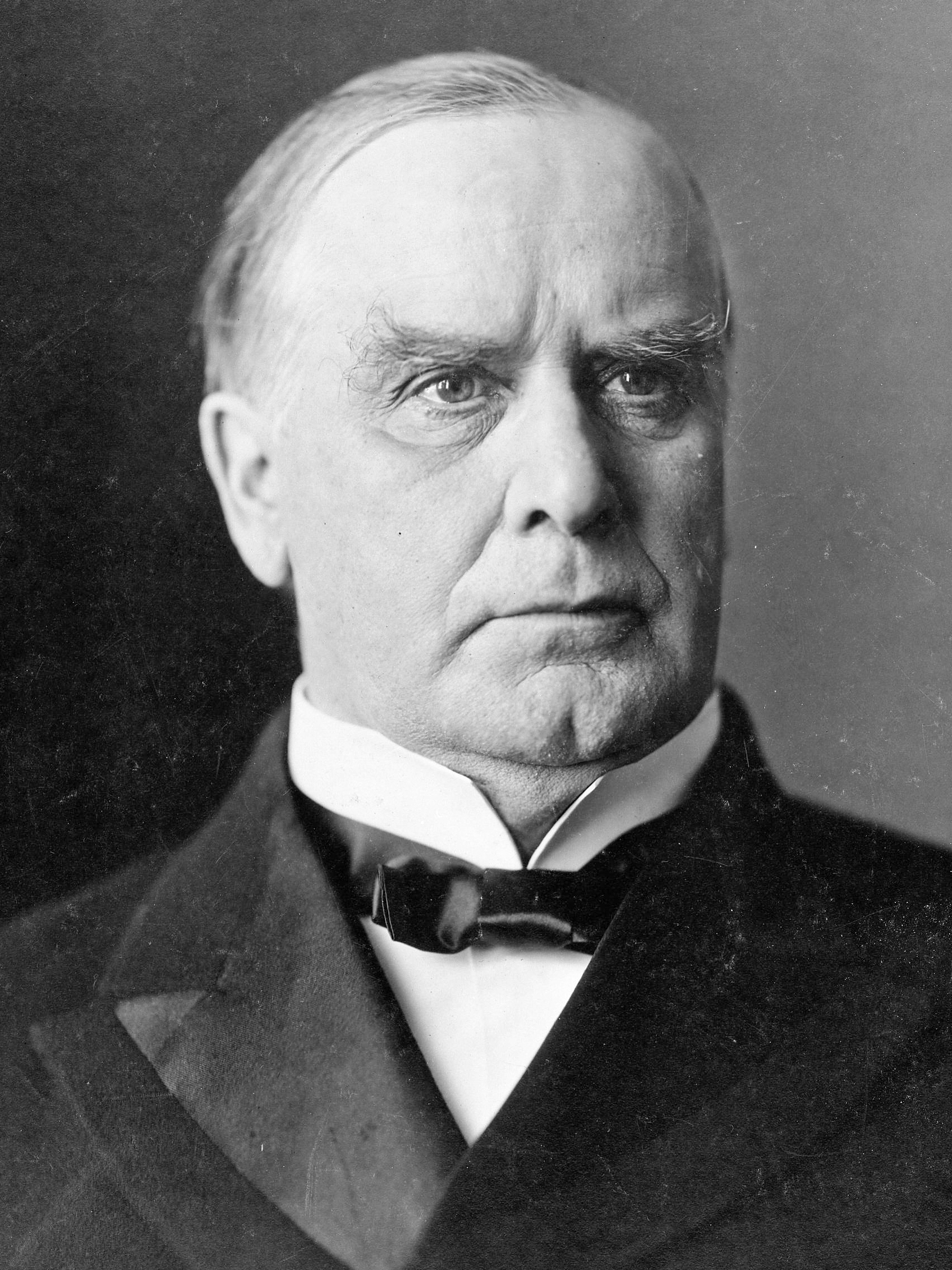

Nominee	William McKinley	William Jennings Bryan
Party	Republican	Democratic
Home state	Ohio	Nebraska
Running mate	Theodore Roosevelt	Adlai Stevenson I
Electoral vote	3	0
Popular vote	14,482	10,164
Percentage	58.71%	41.20%
County results
McKinley
40–50%
50–60%
60–70%
President before election
William McKinley
Republican
Elected President
William McKinley
Republican

The 1900 United States presidential election in Wyoming took place on November 6, 1900, as part of the 1900 United States presidential election. State voters chose three representatives, or electors, to the Electoral College, who voted for president and vice president.

Wyoming was won by the President William McKinley (R–Ohio), running with the 33rd Governor of New York, Theodore Roosevelt, with 58.66 percent of the popular vote, against representative William Jennings Bryan (D–Nebraska), running with the 23rd Vice President Adlai Stevenson I, with 41.17 percent of the popular vote. McKinley won the state by a margin of 17.49%

McKinley had previously lost Wyoming to Bryan four years earlier while Bryan would later go on to lose the state again to William Howard Taft in 1908.

== Results ==
General Election Results
Party	Pledged to	Elector	Votes
Republican Party	William McKinley	A. E. Bradbury	14,482
Republican Party	William McKinley	Bryant B. Brooks	14,465
Republican Party	William McKinley	Ervin F. Cheney	14,409
Democratic Party	William Jennings Bryan	W. W. Burton	10,164
Democratic Party	William Jennings Bryan	William H. Hunt	10,156
Democratic Party	William Jennings Bryan	Mike Murphy	10,134
Social Democratic Party	Eugene V. Debs	Levi Wood	21
Social Democratic Party	Eugene V. Debs	S. W. Cook	21
Social Democratic Party	Eugene V. Debs	Peter Esperson (Note: The Wyoming Blue Book, Volume II lists Esperson as having been a Populist or Prohibitionist, but this makes no sense. Esperson's votes match those of Wood and Cook exactly except for one precinct in Sheridan County; this almost certainly indicates that his votes were on the same ticket as those of Wood and Cook. Moreover, Esperson was on the Socialist ticket as a presidential elector in 1904. Thus, there was no Populist or Prohibition vote in Wyoming in 1900.)	20
Votes cast (Note: Based on totals for highest elector on each ticket)			24,667

=== Results by county ===
County	William McKinley Republican		William Jennings Bryan Democratic		Eugene V. Debs Socialist		Margin		Total votes cast (Note: Based on highest elector on each ticket)
County	#	%	#	%	#	%	#	%	Total votes cast
Albany	1,540	60.61%	1,001	39.39%	0	0.00%	539	21.21%	2,541
Big Horn	843	63.77%	479	36.23%	0	0.00%	364	27.53%	1,322
Carbon	1,757	60.40%	1,152	39.60%	0	0.00%	605	20.80%	2,909
Converse	795	66.19%	406	33.81%	0	0.00%	389	32.39%	1,201
Crook	692	56.58%	531	43.42%	0	0.00%	161	13.16%	1,223
Fremont	919	63.03%	539	36.97%	0	0.00%	380	26.06%	1,458
Johnson	466	51.43%	440	48.57%	0	0.00%	26	2.87%	906
Laramie	2,181	58.64%	1,538	41.36%	0	0.00%	643	17.29%	3,719
Natrona	520	66.07%	267	33.93%	0	0.00%	253	32.15%	787
Sheridan	1,018	50.30%	985	48.67%	21 (Note: These votes are not listed in the statewide summary; they can be found in the precinct detail for Sheridan County on pg. 59 of the source.)	1.04%	33	1.63%	2,024
Sweetwater	1,101	59.80%	740	40.20%	0	0.00%	361	19.61%	1,841
Uinta	2,102	54.60%	1,748	45.40%	0	0.00%	354	9.19%	3,850
Weston	548	61.85%	338	38.15%	0	0.00%	210	23.70%	886
Totals	14,482	58.71%	10,164	41.20%	21	0.09%	4,318	17.51%	24,667

==== Counties that flipped from Democratic to Republican ====
- Big Horn
- Crook
- Johnson
- Sheridan
- Sweetwater
- Uinta

== See also ==
- United States presidential elections in Wyoming
