= Fort Bridger Rendezvous =

Coordinates: 41°19′04″N 110°23′31″W

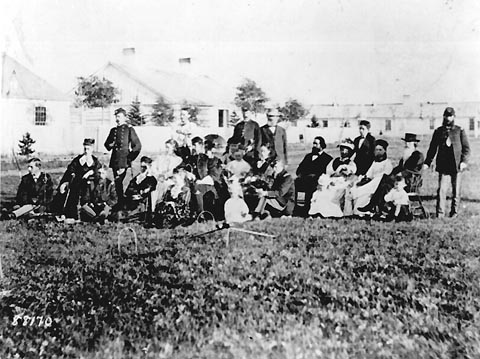
Ft. Bridger, Wyo., 1873

The Fort Bridger Rendezvous is an annual reenactment of fur trading as it happened from 1825 to 1840 between mountain men, Native Americans, fur trappers and traders. The event takes place at Fort Bridger, Wyoming on first weekend of September. This family-friendly event is one of the largest mountain man gatherings in the nation.

== History ==
The fur trade era was from 1825 to 1840. It was caused by the popularity of beaver skin hats on the east coast of the United States and Europe. In response to the high demand fur trappers and traders headed west to hunt for beaver. In the fall and winter the beavers would be hunted and their pelts would be scraped, stretched and salted for shipment. Then in the spring and summer these trappers would travel over 1,000 miles one way to St. Louis so they could sell their product for supplies. The suppliers decided it would be more effective coming to the mountain men and trading supplies for the furs there instead of St. Louis, thus the Rendezvous was born. The first Rendezvous took place in southern Wyoming in 1825.

Every year over Labor Day weekend the town of Fort Bridger, Wyoming holds a reenactment of the Rendezvous which took place during the Fur Trade Era. Marksmanship contests are held with rifles of the time period, along with axe throwing contests and archery. Foods of the time period are also sold, and the Fort Bridger Historical site has workshops people can get involved in to learn about what life was like in those days.
