= Almy, Wyoming =

- Ghost town
- Location within the state of Wyoming Almy, Wyoming (the United States)
- Coordinates: 41°19′54″N 111°00′18″W
- Country: United States
- State: Wyoming
- County: Uinta
- Elevation: 6,588 ft (2,008 m)
- Time zone: UTC-7 (Mountain (MST))
  - Summer (DST): UTC-6 (MDT)
- GNIS feature ID: 1584802

Almy was a coal mining camp in Uinta County, Wyoming, United States, near the town of Evanston.

In 1881, an explosion killed 38 miners in the Central Pacific Mine, marking the first mine explosion west of the Mississippi River. Another explosion killed 13 in 1886, and a third explosion in Red Canyon in 1895 killed 62 miners, the third worst mining disaster in Wyoming history. Following the second explosion, the Wyoming territorial legislature established the office of the state mining inspector, which eventually shut down the Almy mines in the 1940s after it was deemed too dangerous to mine there.

== 1881 explosion ==
On March 4, 1881, gases in the Central Pacific Mine number 3 exploded, killing 38 miners. On March 10, the Cheyenne Weekly Leader reported the disaster:

A terrific explosion occurred last night between 9 and 10 o'clock in the Central Pacific mine, killing 35 Chinamen and 3 white men. The mine was opened in 1869 and is nearly worked out. It is mine No. 3, Nos. 1 and 2 having-been worked out. About 200 men worked in the mine by day and as many as 75 at night. Nearly the whole force was Chinamen. A fire had been raging in the mine for 5 years, but it had been hemmed in by stone walls. The supposition is that gas accumulated and in some way communicated with the fire . The explosion burned the surface works, and the mine slope was set on fire . Fifteen men were rescued alive from the fourth level. and 1 was badly injured from the north air course.

== 1886 explosion ==
On the night of January 12, 1886, gas ignited at the Almy Number 4 mine claiming 11 men and 2 boys. The Deseret Evening News in Salt Lake City described the disaster:

The night of January 12 about 25 minutes to 12, the people of the vicinity were startled by a loud report as of thunder, and for a few seconds the sky was illuminated for miles like a bright-yellow sunset. The noise and light, proceeding from the No. 4 mine, was caused by an explosion of gas, the force of which was so terrific as to blow all of the building's above-ground into kindling wood, sending great timbers and rocks three-quarters of a mile. Miners’ houses were' struck and pierced, but the people in them were not seriously injured. Two miners riding down the slope in a trip of empty cars had got down to the 3d level when the explosion broke the cars into fragments and shot them out as from a cannon. The two bodies were blown to pieces and were found a considerable distance from the portal. Eleven men and two boys were said to have been in the mine, and all were killed. (Rescue' crews forced their way into the mine and placed temporary brattices to permit recovery of the bodies. The last was brought, out January 15. The explosion was thought to have originated in the 13th level on the south side of the mine, when gas was ignited by a miner's open light. Although the mine had been troubled with gas the fireboss had reported it clear at 6 a. m. on the day of the explosion.

The Union Pacific Coal Company, a subsidiary of the Union Pacific Railroad, had an ownership stake in one of Almy's mines. The 4 mile Almy Spur line connected it to the Overland Route of the Union Pacific Railroad

== 1895 explosion ==
On March 20, 1895, an explosion combined with flying debris at the Red Canyon #5 mine near Almy killed 62 miners. It is the third worst mine disaster in Wyoming history, exceeded only by disasters in Kemmerer and Hanna.

Rescue squads tried to enter the mine all through the night, but without success. There were no survivors from the initial explosion.

Additional information including press quotations, a map of Almy, and a list of the dead available here
