= 1896 United States presidential election in Wyoming =

- November 3, 1896

Nominee	William Jennings Bryan	William McKinley
Party	Democratic	Republican
Alliance	Populist
Home state	Nebraska	Ohio
Running mate	Arthur Sewall (Democratic) (Note: Martin and Quealy voted for Sewall for Vice President); Thomas E. Watson (Populist) (Note: Van Meter voted for Watson for Vice-President.)	Garret Hobart
Electoral vote	3	0
Popular vote	10,861	10,072
Percentage	51.49%	47.75%
County results
Bryan
50–60%
60–70%
McKinley
50–60%
President before election
Grover Cleveland
Democratic
Elected President
William McKinley
Republican

The 1896 United States presidential election in Wyoming took place on November 3, 1896, as part of the 1896 United States presidential election. State voters chose three representatives, or electors, to the Electoral College, who voted for president and vice president.

Wyoming was won by representative William Jennings Bryan (D–Nebraska), running with shipbuilder, railroad president and director, bank president Arthur Sewall, with 51.49 percent of the popular vote, against the 39th Governor of Ohio William McKinley (R–Ohio), running with New Jersey State Senator, Garret Hobart, with 47.75 percent of the popular vote. Bryan won the state by a narrow margin of 3.74%.

This is also the only election where the Republican candidate won the election without Wyoming.

Bryan's support for many Populist goals resulted in him being nominated by both the Democratic Party and the People's Party (Populists), though with different running mates. One electoral vote from Wyoming was cast for the Populist Bryan-Watson ticket with Thomas E. Watson as vice president and two votes were cast for the Bryan-Sewall ticket.

Bryan would later lose Wyoming to William McKinley four years later and would later lose the state again to William Howard Taft in 1908.

== Results ==
General Election Results
Party	Pledged to	Elector	Votes
Democratic Party	William Jennings Bryan	John A. Martin	10,375
Democratic Party	William Jennings Bryan	Patrick J. Quealy	10,352
Democratic Party & People's Party	William Jennings Bryan	Daniel L. Van Meter	10,138
Republican Party	William McKinley	William F. Brittain	10,072
Republican Party	William McKinley	Benjamin F. Howell	10,032
Republican Party	William McKinley	Sarah Ruby Malloy	9,997
People's Party	William Jennings Bryan	Patrick J. M. Jordan	486
People's Party	William Jennings Bryan	John Sims	427
Prohibition Party	Joshua Levering	O. C. Smith	159
Prohibition Party	Joshua Levering	O. S. Jackson	136
Prohibition Party	Joshua Levering	Nina W. Higby	133
Votes cast (Note: Based on totals for highest elector on each ticket)			21,092

=== Results by county ===
County	William Jennings Bryan						William McKinley Republican		Joshua Levering Prohibition		Margin		Total votes cast (Note: Based on highest elector on each ticket)
County	Democratic		Populist		Total		William McKinley Republican		Joshua Levering Prohibition		Margin		Total votes cast
County	#	%	#	%	#	%	#	%	#	%	#	%	Total votes cast
Albany	1,028	44.41%	45	1.94%	1,073	46.35%	1,220	52.70%	22	0.95%	-147	-6.35%	2,315
Big Horn	518	45.20%	73	6.37%	591	51.57%	538	46.95%	17	1.48%	53	4.62%	1,146
Carbon	1,039	44.82%	41	1.77%	1,080	46.59%	1,229	53.02%	9	0.39%	-149	-6.43%	2,318
Converse	450	42.57%	9	0.85%	459	43.42%	585	55.35%	13	1.23%	-126	-11.92%	1,057
Crook	537	48.86%	32	2.91%	569	51.77%	524	47.68%	6	0.53%	45	4.09%	1,099
Fremont	499	46.90%	24	2.26%	523	49.15%	535	50.28%	6	0.57%	-12	-1.13%	1,064
Johnson	441	58.57%	26	3.45%	467	62.02%	284	37.72%	2	0.27%	183	24.30%	753
Laramie	1,590	46.45%	38	1.11%	1,628	47.56%	1,776	51.88%	19	0.56%	-148	-4.32%	3,423
Natrona	317	43.91%	10	1.39%	327	45.29%	392	54.29%	3	0.42%	-65	-9.00%	722
Sheridan	1,045	52.46%	59	2.96%	1,104	55.42%	877	44.03%	11	0.55%	227	11.40%	1,992
Sweetwater	916	51.26%	80	4.48%	996	55.74%	754	42.19%	37	2.07%	242	13.54%	1,787
Uinta	1,700	64.37%	26	0.98%	1,726	65.35%	907	34.34%	8	0.30%	819	31.01%	2,641
Weston	295 (Note: The Secretary of State's report appears to contain a typo for Democratic elector Martin in this county. The figure given in the report is 296 but this causes Martin's county figures to not add up correctly. Based on newspaper reporting from November 1896, this figure should be 295, which corrects the discrepancy.)	38.06%	23	2.97%	318	41.03%	451	58.19%	6	0.77%	-133	-17.16%	775
Totals	10,375	49.19%	486	2.30%	10,861	51.49%	10,072	47.75%	159	0.75%	789	3.74%	21,092

== See also ==
- United States presidential elections in Wyoming
