= 1908 United States presidential election in Wyoming =

- November 3, 1908

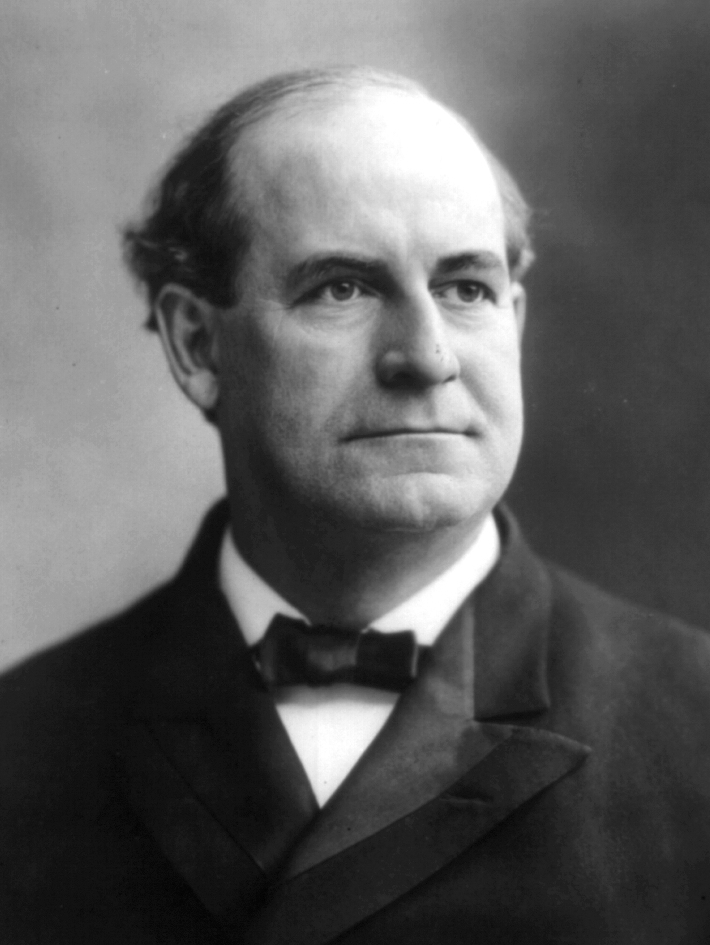
Nominee	William Howard Taft	William Jennings Bryan
Party	Republican	Democratic
Home state	Ohio	Nebraska
Running mate	James S. Sherman	John W. Kern
Electoral vote	3	0
Popular vote	20,846	14,918
Percentage	55.43%	39.67%
County results
Taft
40–50%
50–60%
60–70%
President before election
Theodore Roosevelt
Republican
Elected President
William Howard Taft
Republican

The 1908 United States presidential election in Wyoming took place on November 3, 1908, as part of the 1908 United States presidential election. State voters chose three representatives, or electors, to the Electoral College, who voted for president and vice president.

Wyoming was won by the Secretary of War William Howard Taft (R–Ohio), running with representative James S. Sherman, with 55.43 percent of the popular vote, against representative William Jennings Bryan (D–Nebraska), running with Senator John W. Kern, with 39.67 percent of the popular vote. Taft won the state by a margin of 15.76%, however, Bryan won a larger share of the popular vote than Wilson would win the state with four years later.

Bryan had previously won Wyoming against William McKinley in 1896 but had lost the state to McKinley in 1900.

== Results ==
General Election Results
Party	Pledged to	Elector	Votes
Republican Party	William Howard Taft	John W. Hay	20,846
Republican Party	William Howard Taft	Fred Waegele	20,829
Republican Party	William Howard Taft	Thomas A. Cosgriff	20,802
Democratic Party	William Jennings Bryan	Andrew McMicken	14,918
Democratic Party	William Jennings Bryan	John H. Ward	14,863
Democratic Party	William Jennings Bryan	Barnett G. Rodgers	14,823
Socialist Party	Eugene V. Debs	Thomas Crosbie	1,715
Socialist Party	Eugene V. Debs	William W. Paterson	1,712
Socialist Party	Eugene V. Debs	John T. Hawkins	1,704
Prohibition Party	Eugene W. Chafin	Clifford J. Swayer	66
Prohibition Party	Eugene W. Chafin	William H. Clarke	64
Prohibition Party	Eugene W. Chafin	Mary E. Metcalf	64
Independence Party	Thomas L. Hisgen	James Davison	64
Independence Party	Thomas L. Hisgen	Herbert Konald	61
Independence Party	Thomas L. Hisgen	Charles W. Spence	59
Votes cast (Note: Based on totals for highest elector on each ticket)			37,609

=== Results by county ===
County	William Howard Taft Republican		William Jennings Bryan Democratic		Eugene V. Debs Socialist		Eugene W. Chafin Prohibition		Thomas L. Hisgen Independence		Margin		Total votes cast (Note: Based on highest elector on each ticket)
County	#	%	#	%	#	%	#	%	#	%	#	%	Total votes cast
Albany	1,335	49.74%	1,152	42.92%	173	6.45%	19	0.71%	5	0.19%	183	6.82%	2,684
Big Horn	2,638	60.28%	1,648	37.66%	80	1.83%	0	0.00%	10	0.23%	990	22.62%	4,376
Carbon	1,651	51.56%	1,430	44.66%	119	3.72%	0	0.00%	2	0.06%	221	6.90%	3,202
Converse	1,030	58.36%	716	40.57%	18	1.02%	0	0.00%	1	0.06%	314	17.79%	1,765
Crook	1,068	54.46%	799	40.74%	94	4.79%	0	0.00%	0	0.00%	269	13.72%	1,961
Fremont	1,838	58.74%	1,190	38.03%	88	2.81%	5	0.16%	8	0.26%	648	20.71%	3,129
Johnson	781	55.39%	614	43.55%	11	0.78%	0	0.00%	4	0.28%	167	11.84%	1,410
Laramie	2,965	52.65%	2,523	44.80%	106	1.88%	35	0.62%	3	0.05%	442	7.85%	5,632
Natrona	835	63.74%	461	35.19%	10	0.76%	2	0.15%	2	0.15%	374	28.55%	1,310
Sheridan	2,158	54.99%	1,539	39.22%	218	5.56%	5	0.13%	4	0.10%	619	15.77%	3,924
Sweetwater	1,299	58.49%	637	28.68%	284	12.79%	0	0.00%	1	0.05%	662	29.81%	2,221
Uinta	2,525	53.08%	1,731	36.39%	478	10.05%	0	0.00%	23	0.48%	794	16.69%	4,757
Weston	723	58.40%	478	38.61%	36	2.91%	0	0.00%	1	0.08%	245	19.79%	1,238
Totals	20,846	55.43%	14,918	39.67%	1,715	4.56%	66	0.18%	64	0.17%	5,928	15.76%	37,609

== See also ==
- United States presidential elections in Wyoming
