= Piedmont, Wyoming =

Ghost town in Uinta County, Wyoming, United States

- Ghost town
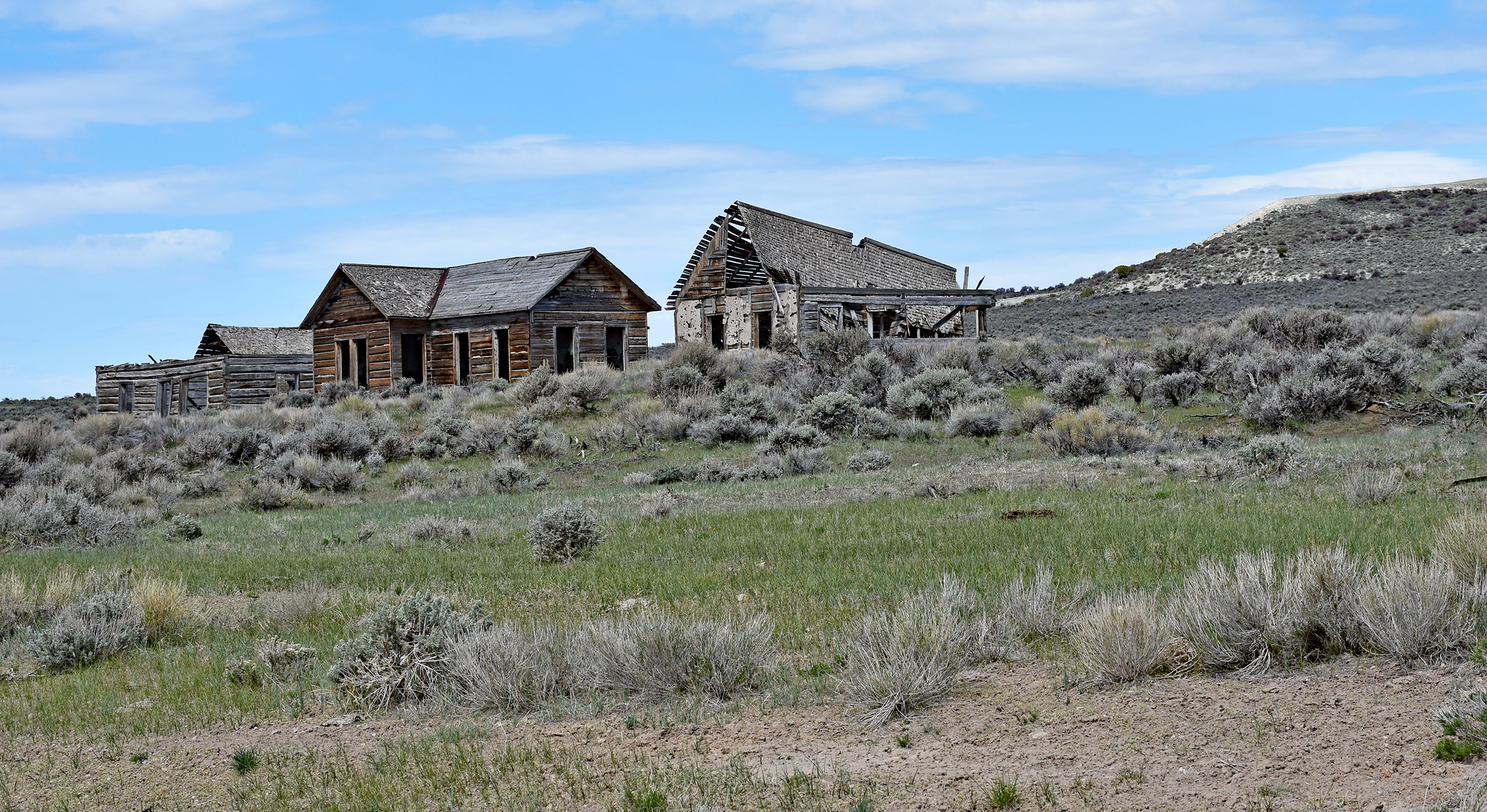
- Abandoned buildings at Piedmont

- Location within the state of Wyoming Piedmont, Wyoming (the United States)
- Coordinates: 41°13′4″N 110°37′40″W
- Country: United States
- State: Wyoming
- County: Uinta
- Time zone: UTC-7 (Mountain (MST))
  - Summer (DST): UTC-6 (MDT)

Piedmont is a ghost town located in Uinta County, Wyoming, United States. It was once a thriving small railroad and timber town, but started to decline when Union Pacific opened a new line that bypassed the town.

== Geography ==
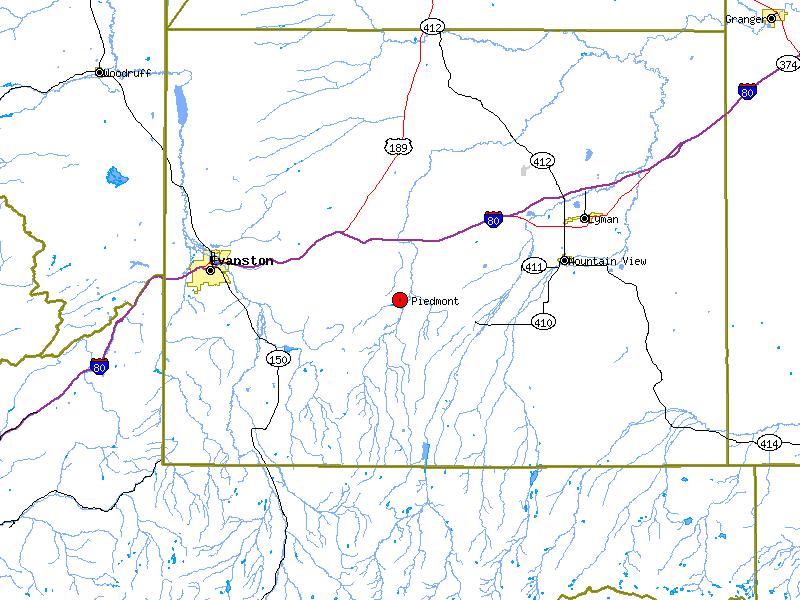
Map of Wyoming with Piedmont highlighted

Piedmont is located at 41°13'4.04" North, 110°37'40.02" West (41.21779, -110.62778).

Many sources will provide other coordinates for this town, but they usually point to Fort Bridger, which is the nearest city.

== History ==
Piedmont, located southeast of Evanston, was settled circa 1867 to provide railroad ties for the Union Pacific Railroad. Moses Byrne built several kilns here for producing charcoal, and Charles Guild established one of the first ranches in the Territory. Both Byrne and Guild were Mormon pioneers.

Originally, the area was named "Byrne," but due to confusion with Bryan Station was renamed Piedmont. Both Byrne's wives, Anne Beus and Catherine Cardon, and Guild's wife, Marie Madeleine Cardon, were from small towns in the Province of Turin, part of the Piedmont region of northern Italy. Moses' wife Anne Beus lived in Ogden, Utah, and his other wife Catherine Cardon eventually ended up living in Piedmont, after first having spent time in the Utah towns of Ogden and Slaterville. Most historical sources that reference both 'Mrs. Byrne' and Piedmont are taken to be referring to Catherine Cardon. Catherine Cardon Byrne and Marie Madelaine Cardon Guild were sisters.

The Guild family joined the Byrne family in 1866 at the Muddy River Station in southwest Wyoming, having traveled from Salt Lake City. As the transcontinental railroad moved into western Wyoming, a wood and water station was needed, and it was found that a spot approximately five miles west of the Muddy River station was ideal, being situated in the direct line of the track. Moses Byrne was asked to run the station. It was thought at first that they would call it Byrne, but it was later decided that the name might be confusing, since there was a station called Bryan west of Green River.

Piedmont, a typical tent camp for the railroad, probably at this time knew its greatest population; yet there is evidence of only approximately twenty homes. The tent town served as a base camp for the graders who were constructing a roadbed up the steep side of the mountain to the summit called Aspen Station.

The route for the railroad had many sharp curves, including a full horseshoe bend. By 1868, the railroad crew arrived to lay track on the prepared roadbed. It was soon realized that helper engines would be needed on the 8 mile grade. Wells that were dug provided plentiful water. Sidings, an engine shed, and a water tank were constructed, and Piedmont became a wood and water refueling station for helper engines.

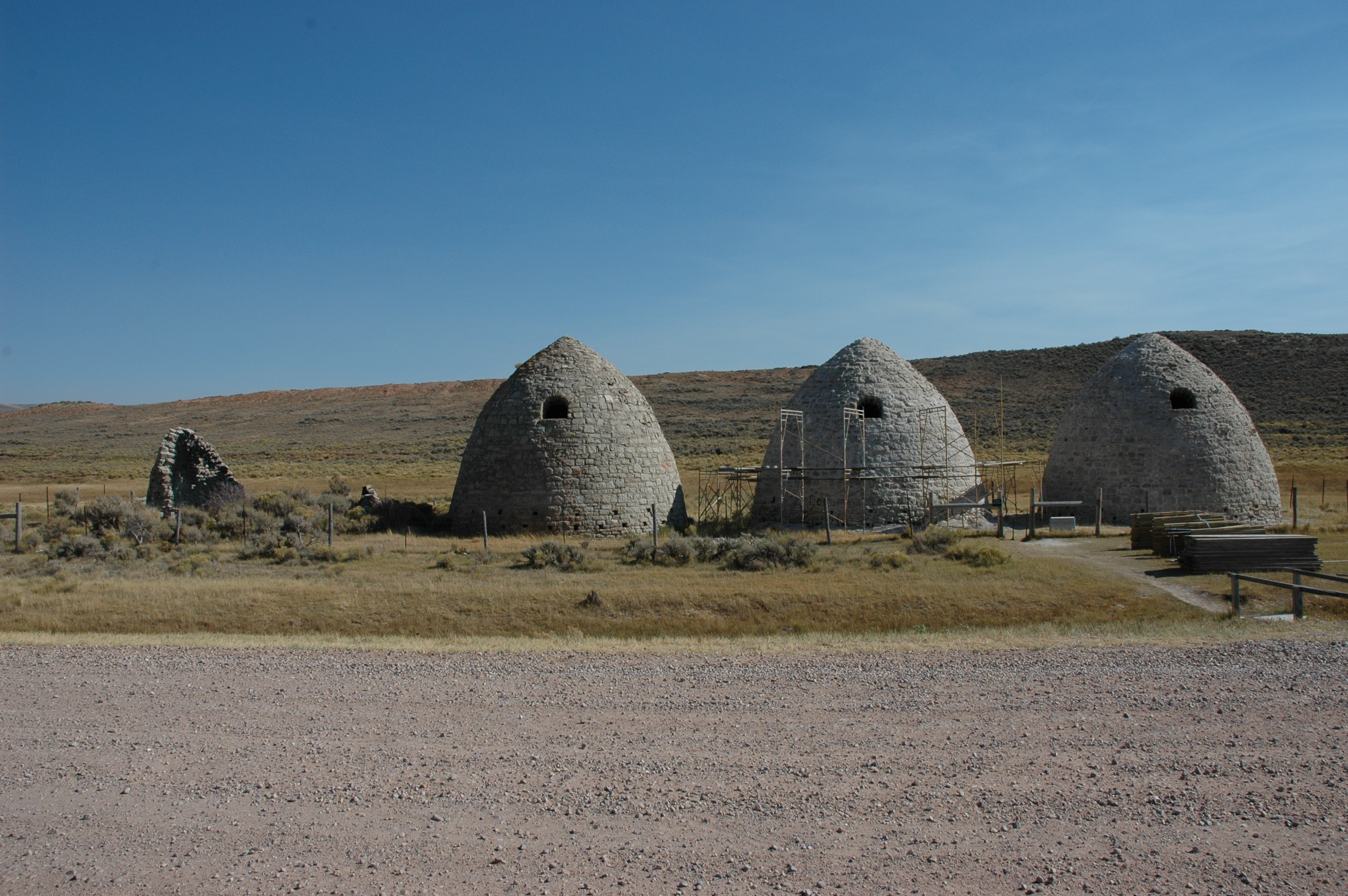
Piedmont Charcoal Kilns

Men were needed to run the helper engines, so more families moved in. There were also homesteaders arriving at that time. The Guilds opened a mercantile establishment, and the town boasted 4 saloons.

The logging industry, as a commercial venture, became well established in Piedmont as well. Moses Byrne constructed charcoal kilns in Piedmont during 1877. 5 in total were built, at a cost of $1,500. Quaking aspen and pine logs were hauled by ox teams to the kilns where they were burned into charcoal. The Union Pacific Railroad Company used the charcoal as fuel for the passenger cars. The three surviving Piedmont Charcoal Kilns were listed on the National Register of Historic Places in 1971.

== The End of Piedmont as a viable town ==
About 1910, the Union Pacific Railroad began digging the Aspen tunnel through Aspen mountain. The completion of the tunnel—approximately one and one-half miles long—resulted in the elimination of the steep, winding grade from Piedmont to Aspen Station. The railroad was rerouted from LeRoy to the tunnel, missing Piedmont by several miles. Piedmont was stranded, and its demise began.

In 1940, lack of business forced the closing of the old Guild Mercantile Store. Since then, most of the buildings have been hauled away. All that remains are three or four tumbledown remnants of homes, some foundations, the coal dump where the engine shed once stood, the charcoal kilns of Moses Byrne, and the cemeteries.

== See also ==
- List of ghost towns in Wyoming
