= Lonetree, Wyoming =

Census-designated place in Uinta County, Wyoming, United States

- Census-designated place
- Location in Uinta County and the state of Wyoming
- Coordinates: 41°00′48″N 110°09′14″W
- Country: United States
- State: Wyoming
- County: Uinta

Area
  - Total: 45.6 sq mi (118.2 km^{2})
  - Land: 45.6 sq mi (118.1 km^{2})
  - Water: 0.039 sq mi (0.1 km^{2})
- Elevation: 7,556 ft (2,303 m)

Population (2010)
  - Total: 49
  - Density: 1.1/sq mi (0.41/km^{2})
- Time zone: UTC-7 (Mountain (MST))
  - Summer (DST): UTC-6 (MDT)
- ZIP code: 82936
- Area code: 307
- FIPS code: 56-47370
- GNIS feature ID: 2408125

Lonetree is a census-designated place (CDP) in Uinta County, Wyoming, United States. The population was 49 at the 2010 census.

== Geography ==
According to the United States Census Bureau, the CDP has a total area of 45.6 square miles (118.2 km^{2}), of which 45.6 square miles (118.1 km^{2}) is land and 0.04 square mile (0.1 km^{2}) (0.04%) is water.

== Demographics ==
As of the census of 2000, there were 61 people, 16 households, and 15 families residing in the CDP. The population density was 1.3 people per square mile (0.5/km^{2}). There were 25 housing units at an average density of 0.5/sq mi (0.2/km^{2}). The racial makeup of the CDP was 100.00% White.

There were 16 households, out of which 50.0% had children under the age of 18 living with them, 81.3% were married couples living together, 6.3% had a female householder with no husband present, and 6.3% were non-families. No households were made up of individuals, and none had someone living alone who was 65 years of age or older. The average household size was 3.81 and the average family size was 3.93.

In the CDP, the population was spread out, with 41.0% under the age of 18, 11.5% from 18 to 24, 19.7% from 25 to 44, 14.8% from 45 to 64, and 13.1% who were 65 years of age or older. The median age was 23 years. For every 100 females, there were 117.9 males. For every 100 females age 18 and over, there were 100.0 males.

The median income for a household in the CDP was $33,125, and the median income for a family was $33,125. Males had a median income of $28,125 versus $18,750 for females. The per capita income for the CDP was $8,788. There were 11.1% of families and 8.6% of the population living below the poverty line, including 13.2% of under eighteens and none of those over 64.

== Education ==
Public education in the community of Lonetree is provided by Uinta County School District #4. The district operates four campuses - Mountain View Elementary School (grades K-2), Fort Bridger Elementary School (grades 3–4), Mountain View Middle School (grades 5–8), and Mountain View High School (grades 9–12).

== See also ==
- List of census-designated places in Wyoming
