= Robertson, Wyoming =

- Census-designated place
- Location in Uinta County and the state of Wyoming
- Coordinates: 41°10′54″N 110°25′39″W
- Country: United States
- State: Wyoming
- County: Uinta

Area
  - Total: 3.1 sq mi (8.1 km^{2})
  - Land: 3.1 sq mi (8.1 km^{2})
  - Water: 0 sq mi (0.0 km^{2})
- Elevation: 7,287 ft (2,221 m)

Population (2020)
  - Total: 241
  - Density: 77/sq mi (30/km^{2})
- Time zone: UTC-7 (Mountain (MST))
  - Summer (DST): UTC-6 (MDT)
- ZIP code: 82944
- Area code: 307
- FIPS code: 56-66655
- GNIS feature ID: 2409191

Robertson is a census-designated place (CDP) in Bridger Valley, Uinta County, Wyoming, United States.

== Geography ==
According to the United States Census Bureau, the CDP has a total area of 3.1 square miles (8.1 km^{2}), all land.

== Demographics ==
As of the census of 2020, there were 241 people in 85 households, residing in the CDP. There were 36 housing units at an average density of 11.6/sq mi (4.5/km^{2}). The racial makeup of the CDP was 96.61% White, and 3.39% from two or more races.

There were 23 households, out of which 26.1% had children under the age of 18 living with them, 73.9% were married couples living together, 8.7% had a female householder with no husband present, and 17.4% were non-families. 13.0% of all households were made up of individuals, and 4.3% had someone living alone who was 65 years of age or older. The average household size was 2.57 and the average family size was 2.84.

In the CDP, the population was spread out, with 25.4% under the age of 18, 3.4% from 18 to 24, 16.9% from 25 to 44, 28.8% from 45 to 64, and 25.4% who were 65 years of age or older. The median age was 48 years. For every 100 females, there were 90.3 males. For every 100 females age 18 and over, there were 91.3 males.

The median income for a household in the CDP was $52,750, and the median income for a family was $31,875. Males had a median income of $21,875 versus $36,250 for females. The per capita income for the CDP was $17,432. There were 10.5% of families and 7.9% of the population living below the poverty line, including no under eighteens and 25.0% of those over 64.

== Education ==
Public education in the community of Robertson is provided by Uinta County School District #4. The district operates four campuses - Mountain View Elementary School (grades K-2), Fort Bridger Elementary School (grades 3-4), Mountain View Middle School (grades 5-8), and Mountain View High School (grades 9-12).

== See also ==
- Fort Supply (Utah Territory) - early settlement near Robertson
