= Carter, Wyoming =

Census-designated place in Uinta County, Wyoming, United States

- Census-designated place
- Location in Uinta County and the state of Wyoming
- Coordinates: 41°26′26″N 110°25′49″W
- Country: United States
- State: Wyoming
- County: Uinta

Area
  - Total: 3.1 sq mi (7.9 km^{2})
  - Land: 3.1 sq mi (7.9 km^{2})
  - Water: 0 sq mi (0.0 km^{2})
- Elevation: 6,503 ft (1,982 m)

Population (2010)
  - Total: 10
  - Density: 3.3/sq mi (1.3/km^{2})
- Time zone: UTC-7 (Mountain (MST))
  - Summer (DST): UTC-6 (MDT)
- Area code: 307
- FIPS code: 56-13005
- GNIS feature ID: 2407974

Carter is a census-designated place (CDP) in Uinta County, Wyoming, United States. The community was named after Judge William A. Carter. The population was 10 at the 2010 census.

== Geography ==
Carter CDP is located along the Union Pacific Railroad.

According to the United States Census Bureau, the CDP has a total area of 3.1 square miles (7.9 km^{2}), all land.

== Demographics ==
As of the 2000 census of 2000, there were 8 people, 4 households, and 3 families located in the CDP. The population density was 2.6 people per square mile (1.0/km^{2}). There were 6 housing units at an average density of 2.0/sq mi (0.8/km^{2}). The racial makeup of the CDP was 62.50% White, 12.50% Native American, 12.50% Asian, and 12.50% from two or more races.

There were 4 households, out of which 25.0% had children under the age of 18 living with them, 75.0% were married couples living together, and 25.0% were non-families. 25.0% of all households were made up of individuals, and 25.0% had someone living alone who was 65 years of age or older. The average household size was 2.00 and the average family size was 2.33.

In the CDP, the population was spread out, with 12.5% under the age of 18, 12.5% from 25 to 44, 62.5% from 45 to 64, and 12.5% who were 65 years of age or older. The median age was 50 years. For every 100 females, there were 166.7 males. For every 100 females age 18 and over, there were 133.3 males.

The median income for a household in the CDP was $12,083, and the median income for a family was $80,488. Males had a median income of $51,250 versus $26,250 for females. The per capita income for the CDP was $27,229. None of the population or the families were below the poverty line.

== Education ==
Public education in the community of Carter is provided by Uinta County School District #4. The district operates four campuses - Mountain View Elementary School (grades K-2), Fort Bridger Elementary School (grades 3-4), Mountain View Middle School (grades 5-8), and Mountain View High School (grades 9-12).

== See also ==
- List of census-designated places in Wyoming
