= Urie, Wyoming =

Census-designated place in Uinta County, Wyoming, United States

Urie
- Census-designated place
- Location in Uinta County and the state of Wyoming
- Coordinates: 41°18′32″N 110°20′07″W
- Country: United States
- State: Wyoming
- County: Uinta
- Elevation: 6,785 ft (2,068 m)

Population (2010)
  - Total: 262
- Time zone: UTC-7 (Mountain (MST))
  - Summer (DST): UTC-6 (MDT)
- ZIP code: 82937
- Area code: 307
- FIPS code: 56-66655
- GNIS feature ID: 2585085

Urie is a census-designated place in Uinta County, Wyoming, United States. The population was 262 at the 2010 census. The main roads that run through the community are Interstate 80 Business Loop and Wyoming Highway 414.

== See also ==
- List of census-designated places in Wyoming
