= Lyman, Wyoming =

- Town
- Location of Lyman in Uinta County, Wyoming
- Coordinates: 41°19′39″N 110°17′51″W
- Country: United States
- State: Wyoming
- County: Uinta

Area
  - Total: 1.56 sq mi (4.03 km^{2})
  - Land: 1.56 sq mi (4.03 km^{2})
  - Water: 0 sq mi (0.00 km^{2})
- Elevation: 6,706 ft (2,044 m)

Population (2020)
  - Total: 2,135
  - Density: 1,331.1/sq mi (513.94/km^{2})
- Time zone: UTC-7 (Mountain (MST))
  - Summer (DST): UTC-6 (MDT)
- ZIP code: 82937
- Area code: 307
- FIPS code: 56-48675
- GNIS feature ID: 2412928
- Website: Official website

Lyman is a town in Uinta County, Wyoming, United States. The population was 2,135 at the 2020 census.

== Geography ==
According to the United States Census Bureau, the town has a total area of 1.71 square miles (4.43 km^{2}), all land.

== Demographics ==
Historical population
Census	Pop.	Note	%±
1920	577		—
1930	377		−34.7%
1940	378		0.3%
1950	483		27.8%
1960	425		−12.0%
1970	643		51.3%
1980	2,284		255.2%
1990	1,896		−17.0%
2000	1,938		2.2%
2010	2,115		9.1%
2020	2,135		0.9%
2023 (est.)	2,189	▲	2.5%
U.S. Decennial Census

=== 2020 census ===
As of the 2020 census, Lyman had a population of 2,135. The median age was 32.9 years. 32.7% of residents were under the age of 18 and 13.0% of residents were 65 years of age or older. For every 100 females there were 105.3 males, and for every 100 females age 18 and over there were 101.1 males age 18 and over.

0.0% of residents lived in urban areas, while 100.0% lived in rural areas.

There were 772 households in Lyman, of which 41.6% had children under the age of 18 living in them. Of all households, 60.8% were married-couple households, 15.8% were households with a male householder and no spouse or partner present, and 17.4% were households with a female householder and no spouse or partner present. About 22.7% of all households were made up of individuals and 9.9% had someone living alone who was 65 years of age or older.

There were 847 housing units, of which 8.9% were vacant. The homeowner vacancy rate was 1.9% and the rental vacancy rate was 14.3%.

Racial composition as of the 2020 census
Race	Number	Percent
White	1,998	93.6%
Black or African American	3	0.1%
American Indian and Alaska Native	7	0.3%
Asian	14	0.7%
Native Hawaiian and Other Pacific Islander	0	0.0%
Some other race	23	1.1%
Two or more races	90	4.2%
Hispanic or Latino (of any race)	79	3.7%

=== 2010 census ===
As of the census of 2010, there were 2,115 people, 744 households, and 566 families living in the town. The population density was 1,236.8 inhabitants per square mile (477.5/km^{2}). There were 802 housing units at an average density of 469.0 units per square mile (181.1 units/km^{2}). The racial makeup of the town was 97.3% White, 0.1% African American, 0.6% Native American, 0.1% Asian, 0.1% Pacific Islander, 0.7% from other races, and 1.0% from two or more races. Hispanic or Latino of any race were 3.8% of the population.

There were 744 households, of which 41.7% had children under the age of 18 living with them, 65.2% were married couples living together, 7.1% had a female householder with no husband present, 3.8% had a male householder with no wife present, and 23.9% were non-families. 20.3% of all households were made up of individuals, and 7% had someone living alone who was 65 years of age or older. The average household size was 2.84 and the average family size was 3.31.

The median age in the town was 32.6 years. 32.9% of residents were under the age of 18; 8.1% were between the ages of 18 and 24; 24.2% were from 25 to 44; 26.3% were from 45 to 64; and 8.5% were 65 years of age or older. The gender makeup of the town was 50.4% male and 49.6% female.

=== 2000 census ===
As of the census of 2000, there were 1,938 people, 640 households, and 504 families living in the town. The population density was 1,326.7 people per square mile (512.2 people/km^{2}). There were 708 housing units at an average density of 484.7 units per square mile (187.1 units/km^{2}). The racial makeup of the town was 98.30% White, 0.41% Native American, 0.10% Asian, 0.05% Pacific Islander, 0.62% from other races, and 0.52% from two or more races. Hispanic or Latino of any race were 2.53% of the population.

There were 640 households, out of which 47.3% had children under the age of 18 living with them, 64.2% were married couples living together, 9.1% had a female householder with no husband present, and 21.1% were non-families. 18.4% of all households were made up of individuals, and 6.3% had someone living alone who was 65 years of age or older. The average household size was 3.03 and the average family size was 3.48.

In the town, the population was spread out, with 36.5% under the age of 18, 10.5% from 18 to 24, 24.8% from 25 to 44, 22.0% from 45 to 64, and 6.2% who were 65 years of age or older. The median age was 28 years. For every 100 females, there were 106.4 males. For every 100 females age 18 and over, there were 96.3 males.

The median income for a household in the town was $50,550, and the median income for a family was $55,132. Males had a median income of $51,042 versus $17,917 for females. The per capita income for the town was $17,966. About 5.7% of families and 7.3% of the population were below the poverty line, including 8.7% of those under age 18 and 6.3% of those age 65 or over.

== Education ==
Children aged five years old and up attend Urie Elementary School (Grades K-4), and Lyman High School (Grades 9–12), once they have progressed through Lyman Intermediate School (Grades 5–8).

Lyman has a public library, a branch of the Uinta County Library System.

== See also ==
- List of municipalities in Wyoming
