= Fort Bridger, Wyoming =

Census-designated place in Uinta County, Wyoming, United States

- Census-designated place
- Location in Uinta County and the state of Wyoming
- Coordinates: 41°19′35″N 110°22′50″W
- Country: United States
- State: Wyoming
- County: Uinta

Area
  - Total: 2.0 sq mi (5.2 km^{2})
  - Land: 2.0 sq mi (5.2 km^{2})
  - Water: 0 sq mi (0.0 km^{2})
- Elevation: 6,674 ft (2,034 m)

Population (2020)
  - Total: 354
  - Density: 180/sq mi (68/km^{2})
- Time zone: UTC-7 (Mountain (MST))
  - Summer (DST): UTC-6 (MDT)
- ZIP code: 82933
- Area code: 307
- FIPS code: 56-27940
- GNIS feature ID: 2408233

Fort Bridger is a census-designated place (CDP) in eastern Uinta County, Wyoming, United States. The population was 354 at the 2020 census. The community takes its name from the eponymous Fort Bridger, established in 1842, which is located within the boundaries of the CDP.

== History ==
Fort Bridger was established in 1843 by Jim Bridger and Louis Vasquez. It served as a trading post for those who were traveling westward along the Oregon Trail, as well as LDS Pioneers, the Pony Express, the Lincoln Highway, and the transcontinental railroad. The fort was also commonly used to trade with the local Native Americans.

The fort was not very glamorous, it was even a disappointment to most travelers. It was simply two log cabins about 40 feet (12 m) in length connected by a fence to hold horses. Most visitors complained about insufficient supplies and it being overpriced. They did, however, have a blacksmith's shop that many travelers took advantage of.

In 1847, a small party of Mormons settled near the fort, causing tensions to raise between the settlers and the occupants of Bridger. A year later the Mormons settlers started telling Brigham Young about how the fort was selling booze and ammunition to the local tribes, violating federal law. Young who was also an Indian agent ordered a local Salt Lake City militia made up of forty-eight men to go to Fort Bridger on August 26, 1853. Jim Bridger was warned about them and he managed to escape right before the militia arrived. When the militia entered the fort they found tons of liquor which they destroyed, but were unable to find any of the ammunition. They then left the fort and headed back to Salt Lake City.

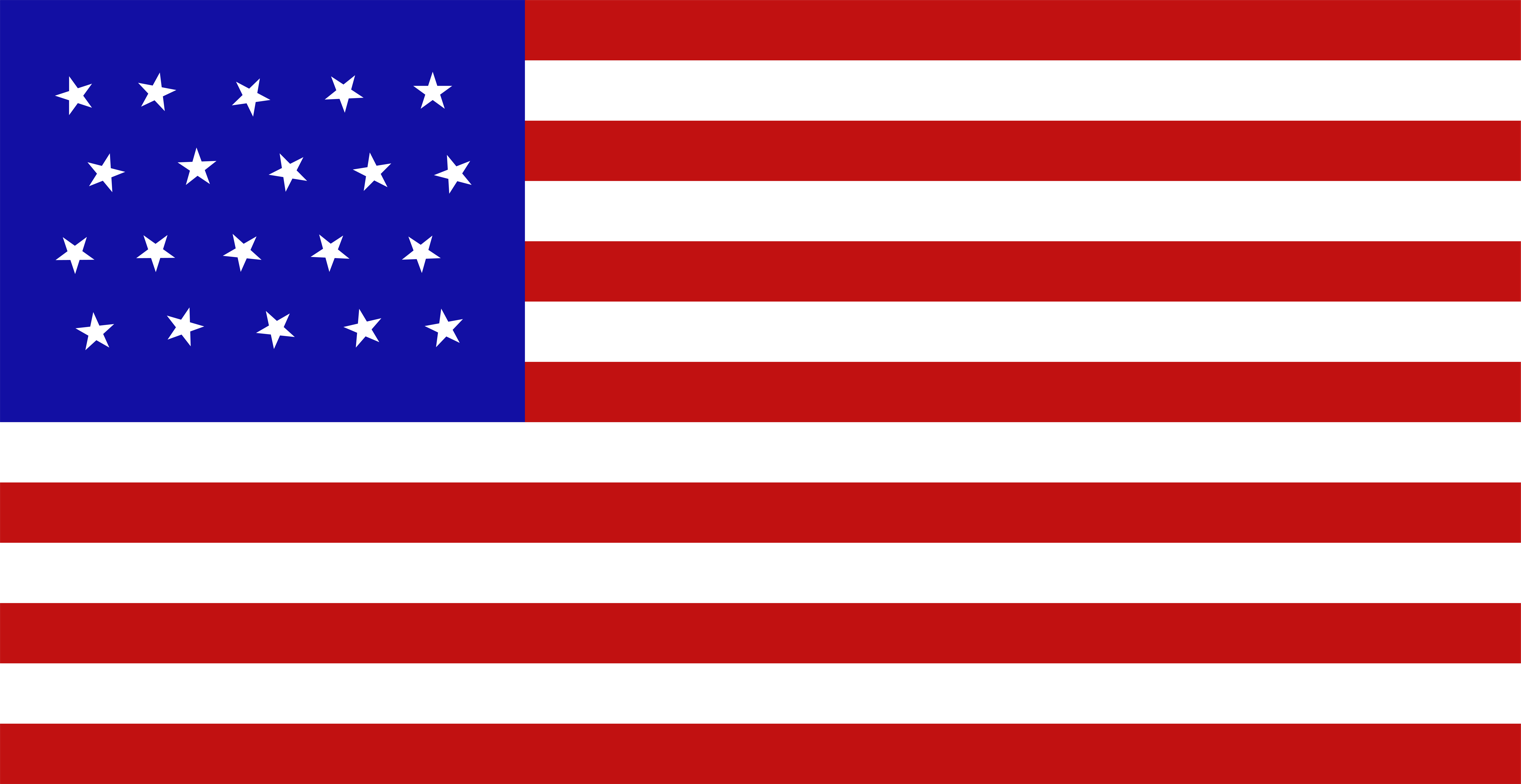
Digital reconstruction of the fort's flag, c1857

After 1857, Judge William A. Carter was given a 20 star American flag to fly over the fort.

By 1858, Fort Bridger became a military outpost. Today, Fort Bridger is a historic site. Jim Bridger’s trading post is reconstructed, along with other historic buildings from the military. There is also a museum with gift shops available for visitors.

== Geography ==
According to the United States Census Bureau, the CDP has a total area of 2.0 square miles (5.2 km^{2}), all land.

== Demographics ==
Historical population
Census	Pop.	Note	%±
2000	400		—
2010	345		−13.7%
2020	354		2.6%
U.S. Decennial Census

As of the census of 2000, there were 400 people, 158 households, and 114 families residing in the CDP. The population density was 200.6 people per square mile (77.6/km^{2}). There were 183 housing units at an average density of 91.8/sq mi (35.5/km^{2}). The racial makeup of the CDP was 97.00% White, 1.25% Native American, 1.25% from other races, and 0.50% from two or more races. Hispanic or Latino of any race were 2.75% of the population.

There were 158 households, out of which 34.8% had children under the age of 18 living with them, 56.3% were married couples living together, 10.8% had a female householder with no husband present, and 27.8% were non-families. 24.1% of all households were made up of individuals, and 3.8% had someone living alone who was 65 years of age or older. The average household size was 2.53 and the average family size was 2.96.

In the CDP, the population was spread out, with 28.8% under the age of 18, 7.0% from 18 to 24, 29.0% from 25 to 44, 25.0% from 45 to 64, and 10.3% who were 65 years of age or older. The median age was 35 years. For every 100 females, there were 102.0 males. For every 100 females age 18 and over, there were 93.9 males.

The median income for a household in the CDP was $32,031, and the median income for a family was $33,750. Males had a median income of $36,354 versus $17,344 for females. The per capita income for the CDP was $16,662. About 11.6% of families and 11.5% of the population were below the poverty line, including 18.8% of those under age 18 and 5.9% of those age 65 or over.

== Education ==
Public education in the community of Fort Bridger is provided by Uinta County School District #4. The district operates two campuses – Mountain View K–8 (grades K–8), and Mountain View High School (grades 9–12).

== Events ==
- Fort Bridger Rendezvous, annual reenactment of trading

== Notable people ==
- Jim Bridger — explorer and founder of Fort Bridger
- Mark Hopkinson - convicted murderer and the only post-Furman execution in Wyoming
- Ron Micheli — rancher and former Wyoming politician

== See also ==
- List of census-designated places in Wyoming
