= Mountain View, Wyoming =

- Town
- Motto: "Gateway to the High Uintas"
- Location of Mountain View in Uinta County, Wyoming
- Coordinates: 41°16′21″N 110°20′03″W
- Country: United States
- State: Wyoming
- County: Uinta

Government
  - Type: Municipality

Area
  - Total: 0.87 sq mi (2.25 km^{2})
  - Land: 0.87 sq mi (2.25 km^{2})
  - Water: 0 sq mi (0.00 km^{2})
- Elevation: 6,805 ft (2,074 m)

Population (2020)
  - Total: 1,278
  - Density: 1,411.9/sq mi (545.12/km^{2})
- Time zone: UTC-7 (Mountain (MST))
  - Summer (DST): UTC-6 (MDT)
- ZIP code: 82939
- Area code: 307
- FIPS code: 56-55345
- GNIS feature ID: 2413023
- Website: Town of Mountain View Wyoming

Mountain View is a town in Uinta County, Wyoming, United States. As of the 2020 census, Mountain View had a population of 1,278.

== History ==
Mountain View was founded in 1891, and is located near Fort Bridger.

== Geography ==
According to the United States Census Bureau, the town has a total area of 0.85 square miles (2.20 km^{2}), all land.

=== Climate ===
Climate data for Mountain View, Wyoming (1991–2020 normals, extremes 1966–present)
Month	Jan	Feb	Mar	Apr	May	Jun	Jul	Aug	Sep	Oct	Nov	Dec	Year
Record high °F (°C)	57 (14)	62 (17)	78 (26)	79 (26)	87 (31)	92 (33)	94 (34)	92 (33)	93 (34)	82 (28)	74 (23)	62 (17)	94 (34)
Mean maximum °F (°C)	47.6 (8.7)	49.2 (9.6)	60.6 (15.9)	70.6 (21.4)	78.5 (25.8)	84.7 (29.3)	88.5 (31.4)	87.0 (30.6)	82.9 (28.3)	74.2 (23.4)	60.4 (15.8)	49.0 (9.4)	89.3 (31.8)
Mean daily maximum °F (°C)	32.0 (0.0)	33.6 (0.9)	43.8 (6.6)	52.3 (11.3)	62.6 (17.0)	72.6 (22.6)	79.7 (26.5)	78.1 (25.6)	70.0 (21.1)	56.9 (13.8)	41.3 (5.2)	31.3 (−0.4)	54.5 (12.5)
Daily mean °F (°C)	21.5 (−5.8)	22.4 (−5.3)	31.7 (−0.2)	38.7 (3.7)	47.7 (8.7)	56.3 (13.5)	63.2 (17.3)	61.7 (16.5)	53.6 (12.0)	42.4 (5.8)	29.2 (−1.6)	20.9 (−6.2)	40.8 (4.9)
Mean daily minimum °F (°C)	10.9 (−11.7)	11.2 (−11.6)	19.5 (−6.9)	25.1 (−3.8)	32.8 (0.4)	40.0 (4.4)	46.7 (8.2)	45.2 (7.3)	37.2 (2.9)	27.9 (−2.3)	17.2 (−8.2)	10.6 (−11.9)	27.0 (−2.8)
Mean minimum °F (°C)	−6.0 (−21.1)	−6.7 (−21.5)	4.9 (−15.1)	14.3 (−9.8)	21.9 (−5.6)	30.5 (−0.8)	39.6 (4.2)	36.8 (2.7)	25.7 (−3.5)	13.2 (−10.4)	0.0 (−17.8)	−6.5 (−21.4)	−13.2 (−25.1)
Record low °F (°C)	−26 (−32)	−33 (−36)	−22 (−30)	−6 (−21)	13 (−11)	22 (−6)	30 (−1)	28 (−2)	9 (−13)	−16 (−27)	−19 (−28)	−41 (−41)	−41 (−41)
Average precipitation inches (mm)	0.61 (15)	0.56 (14)	0.76 (19)	1.10 (28)	1.36 (35)	0.91 (23)	1.10 (28)	0.82 (21)	1.28 (33)	0.98 (25)	0.76 (19)	0.79 (20)	11.03 (280)
Average snowfall inches (cm)	8.9 (23)	9.0 (23)	9.4 (24)	7.5 (19)	3.0 (7.6)	0.2 (0.51)	0.0 (0.0)	0.0 (0.0)	1.0 (2.5)	5.6 (14)	9.7 (25)	9.5 (24)	63.8 (162)
Average extreme snow depth inches (cm)	6.6 (17)	5.8 (15)	4.6 (12)	2.4 (6.1)	1.4 (3.6)	0.0 (0.0)	0.0 (0.0)	0.0 (0.0)	0.4 (1.0)	2.7 (6.9)	4.6 (12)	5.6 (14)	10.2 (26)
Average precipitation days (≥ 0.01 in)	5.8	6.3	7.1	7.8	8.9	6.2	6.5	7.8	6.8	6.8	5.9	6.5	82.4
Average snowy days (≥ 0.1 in)	3.3	3.7	3.1	2.5	1.0	0.1	0.0	0.0	0.2	1.9	3.2	3.9	22.9
Source: NOAA

== Demographics ==
Historical population
Census	Pop.	Note	%±
1980	628		—
1990	1,189		89.3%
2000	1,153		−3.0%
2010	1,286		11.5%
2020	1,278		−0.6%
U.S. Decennial Census

=== 2010 census ===
As of the census of 2010, there were 1,286 people, 468 households, and 363 families living in the town. The population density was 1,512.9 inhabitants per square mile (584.1/km^{2}). There were 506 housing units at an average density of 595.3 per square mile (229.8/km^{2}). The racial makeup of the town was 97.0% White, 0.1% African American, 0.2% Native American, 0.1% Asian, 1.2% from other races, and 1.5% from two or more races. Hispanic or Latino of any race were 3.9% of the population.

There were 468 households, of which 43.2% had children under the age of 18 living with them, 63.5% were married couples living together, 8.5% had a female householder with no husband present, 5.6% had a male householder with no wife present, and 22.4% were non-families. 18.6% of all households were made up of individuals, and 5.7% had someone living alone who was 65 years of age or older. The average household size was 2.75 and the average family size was 3.13.

The median age in the town was 31.9 years. 32.3% of residents were under the age of 18; 6% were between the ages of 18 and 24; 28.2% were from 25 to 44; 25.5% were from 45 to 64; and 8% were 65 years of age or older. The gender makeup of the town was 50.7% male and 49.3% female.

=== 2000 census ===
As of the census of 2000, there were 1,153 people, 415 households, and 320 families living in the town. The population density was 1,454.8 people per square mile (563.5/km^{2}). There were 456 housing units at an average density of 575.4 per square mile (222.9/km^{2}). The racial makeup of the town was 98.01% White, 0.09% African American, 0.26% Native American, 0.09% Pacific Islander, 0.35% from other races, and 1.21% from two or more races. Hispanic or Latino of any race were 2.17% of the population.

There were 415 households, out of which 43.6% had children under the age of 18 living with them, 64.6% were married couples living together, 9.9% had a female householder with no husband present, and 22.7% were non-families. 20.7% of all households were made up of individuals, and 5.1% had someone living alone who was 65 years of age or older. The average household size was 2.78 and the average family size was 3.21.

In the town, the population was spread out, with 32.3% under the age of 18, 9.0% from 18 to 24, 29.3% from 25 to 44, 22.5% from 45 to 64, and 6.9% who were 65 years of age or older. The median age was 33 years. For every 100 females, there were 105.2 males. For every 100 females age 18 and over, there were 99.2 males.

The median income for a household in the town was $49,000, and the median income for a family was $58,077. Males had a median income of $47,222 versus $26,429 for females. The per capita income for the town was $18,945. About 8.3% of families and 9.0% of the population were below the poverty line, including 10.8% of those under age 18 and 5.1% of those age 65 or over.

== Education ==
Public education in the town of Mountain View is provided by Uinta County School District #4. The district operates two campuses - Mountain View Elementary School (grades K-5) and Mountain View Middle School (grades 6–8) which were combined into one new building in 2015, and Mountain View High School (grades 9-12).

Mountain View has a public library, a branch of the Uinta County Library System.

== Infrastructure ==
=== United States Postal Service ===
The United States Postal Service operates the Mountain View Post Office at 1700 E Parkway St in Mountain View.

== See also ==
- List of municipalities in Wyoming
