= Uinta County, Wyoming =

County in Wyoming, United States

- County
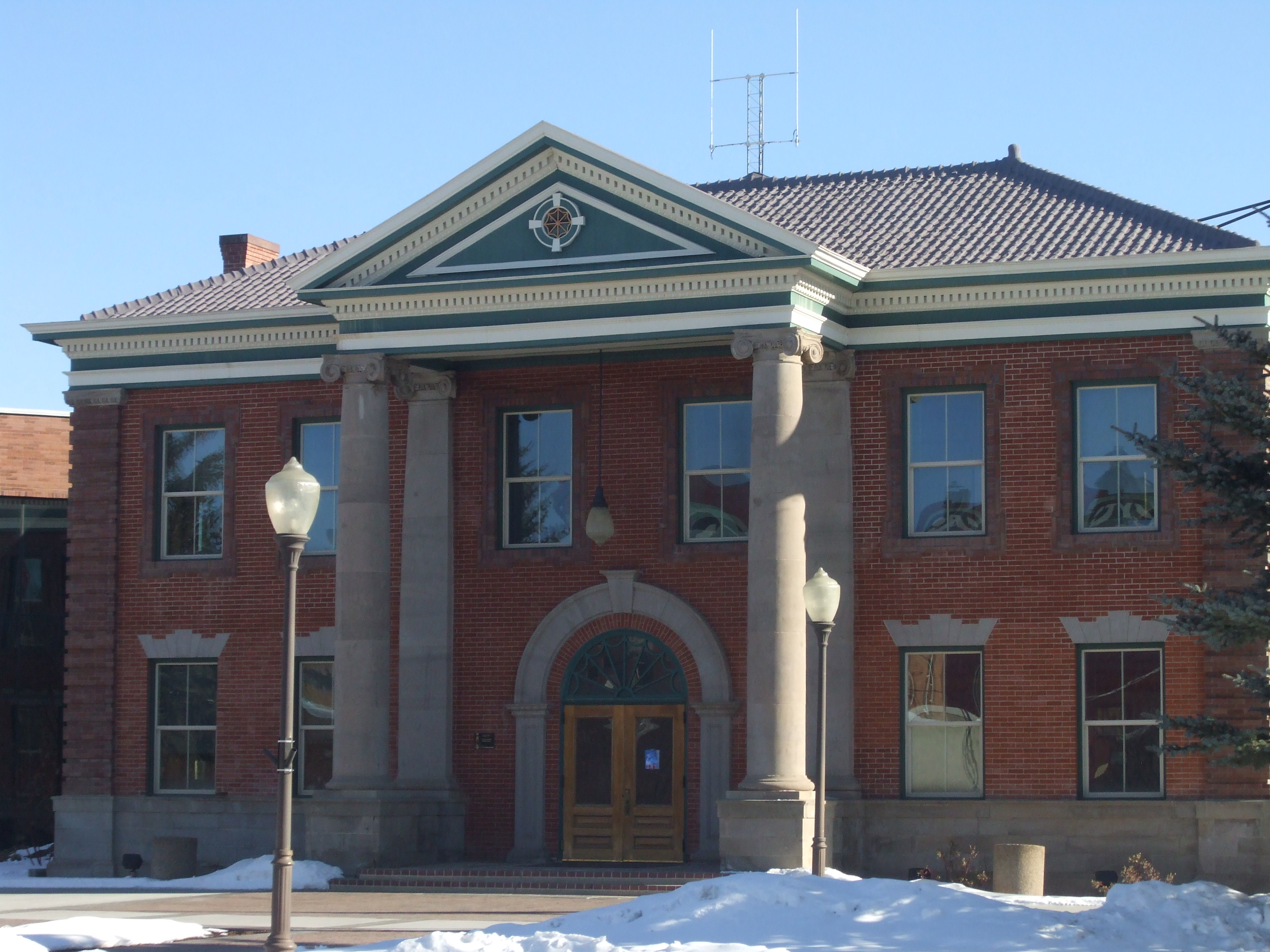
- Uinta County Courthouse

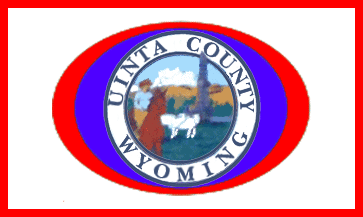
- Flag

- Location within the U.S. state of Wyoming
- Coordinates: 41°17′N 110°33′W
- Country: United States
- State: Wyoming
- Founded: December 1, 1869
- Named for: Uinta Mountains
- Seat: Evanston
- Largest city: Evanston

Area
  - Total: 2,088 sq mi (5,410 km^{2})
  - Land: 2,081 sq mi (5,390 km^{2})
  - Water: 6.3 sq mi (16 km^{2}) 0.3%

Population (2020)
  - Total: 20,450
  - Estimate (2025): 20,728 ▲
  - Density: 9.827/sq mi (3.794/km^{2})
- Time zone: UTC−7 (Mountain)
  - Summer (DST): UTC−6 (MDT)
- Congressional district: At-large
- Website: uintacountywy.gov

Uinta County (/juːˈɪntə/ yoo-IN-tə) is a county in the U.S. state of Wyoming. As of the 2020 United States Census, the population was 20,450. Its county seat is Evanston. Its south and west boundary lines abut the Utah state line. Uinta County, together with Rich County, Utah, comprises the Evanston, WY-UT Micropolitan Statistical Area.

== History ==
Uinta County was created on December 1, 1869, by the legislature of the Wyoming Territory, with its temporary seat located at Fort Bridger.

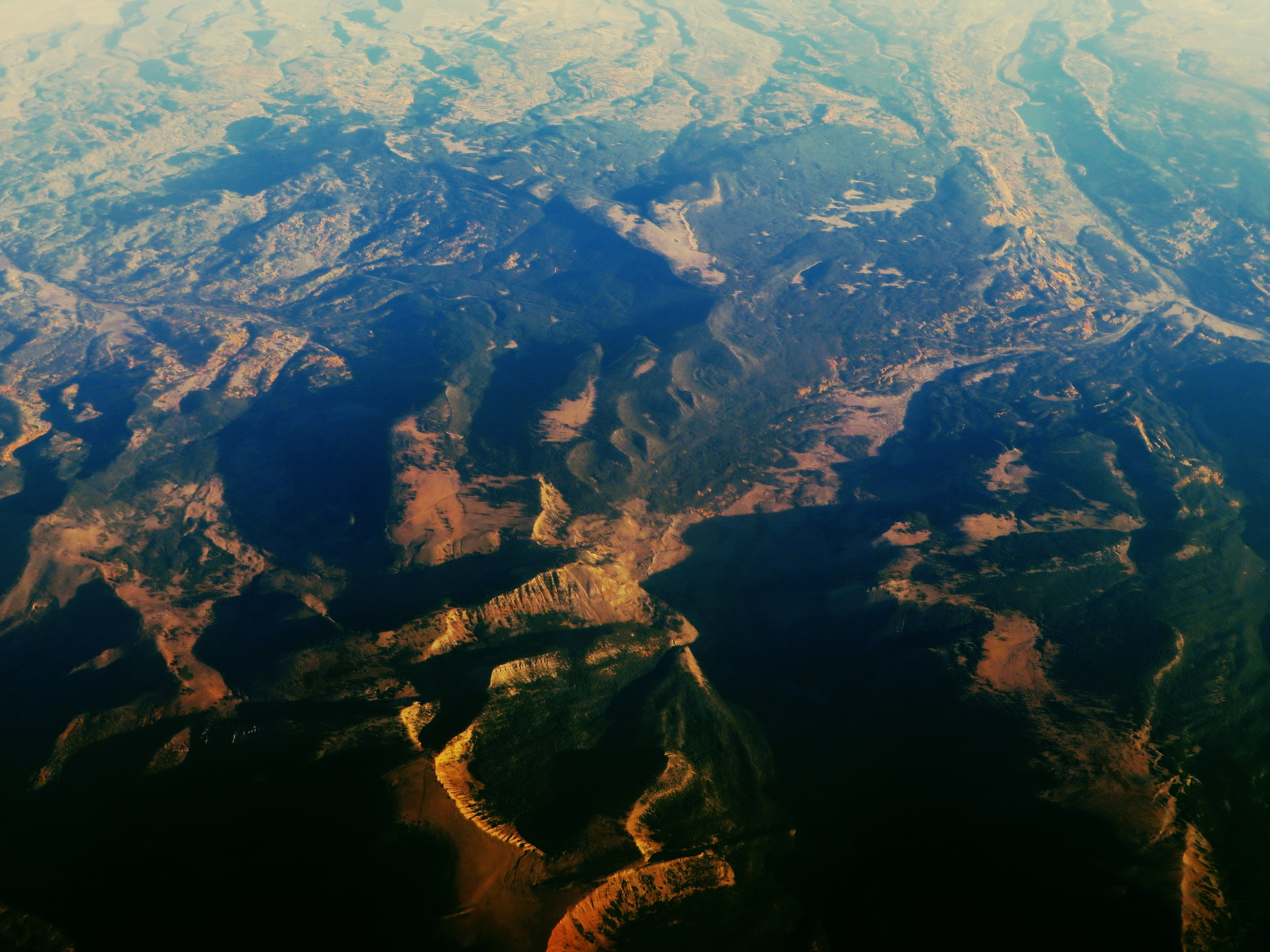
Foothills of the Uinta Mountains south of Evanston, Wyoming

Originally, it ran along the entire western border of Wyoming, including Yellowstone National Park. The county was named for Utah's Uinta Mountains, which are noticeable from many places in the county. The county was given its present boundaries in 1911 when Lincoln County was carved out of the northern part of Uinta County.

== Geography ==
According to the U.S. Census Bureau, the county has a total area of 2,088 square miles (5,410 km^{2}), of which 2,081 square miles (5,390 km^{2}) is land and 6.3 square miles (16 km^{2}) (0.3%) is water. It is the second-smallest county in Wyoming by area.

=== Geology ===
The 161 km wide western North American Fold and thrust belt extends from Alaska to Mexico, forming several northerly trending thrust faults in southwest Wyoming, including the Crawford, Absaroka and Hogsback (Darby), which formed from the Late Jurassic through the early Eocene. The Painter Reservoir Field was discovered in 1977 from the 407 m thick Nuggest Sandstone which forms an anticline structural trap in the hanging wall of the Absaroka thrust plate, at a depth of about 3 km.

=== National protected area ===
- Wasatch National Forest (part)

=== State protected areas ===
- Fort Bridger State Historic Site
- Bear River State Park

=== Major highways ===
- - Interstate 80
- - U.S. Highway 189

=== Adjacent counties ===
- Lincoln County - north
- Rich County, Utah - west
- Summit County, Utah - south and southwest
- Sweetwater County - east

== Demographics ==
Historical population
Census	Pop.	Note	%±
1870	856		—
1880	2,879		236.3%
1890	7,414		157.5%
1900	12,223		64.9%
1910	16,982		38.9%
1920	6,611		−61.1%
1930	6,572		−0.6%
1940	7,223		9.9%
1950	7,331		1.5%
1960	7,484		2.1%
1970	7,100		−5.1%
1980	13,021		83.4%
1990	18,705		43.7%
2000	19,742		5.5%
2010	21,118		7.0%
2020	20,450		−3.2%
2025 (est.)	20,728	▲	1.4%
US Decennial Census; 1870–2000 2010–2016 2020

=== 2020 census ===
As of the 2020 census, the county had a population of 20,450. Of the residents, 28.5% were under the age of 18 and 15.0% were 65 years of age or older; the median age was 37.3 years. For every 100 females there were 101.7 males, and for every 100 females age 18 and over there were 99.0 males.

Uinta County, Wyoming – Racial and ethnic composition Note: the US Census treats Hispanic/Latino as an ethnic category. This table excludes Latinos from the racial categories and assigns them to a separate category. Hispanics/Latinos may be of any race.
Race / Ethnicity (NH = Non-Hispanic)	Pop 2000	Pop 2010	Pop 2020	% 2000	% 2010	% 2020
White alone (NH)	18,210	18,696	17,444	92.24%	88.53%	85.30%
Black or African American alone (NH)	18	48	50	0.09%	0.23%	0.24%
Native American or Alaska Native alone (NH)	161	123	122	0.82%	0.58%	0.60%
Asian alone (NH)	50	59	108	0.25%	0.28%	0.53%
Pacific Islander alone (NH)	12	34	27	0.06%	0.16%	0.13%
Other race alone (NH)	17	2	76	0.09%	0.01%	0.37%
Mixed race or Multiracial (NH)	219	301	637	1.11%	1.43%	3.11%
Hispanic or Latino (any race)	1,055	1,855	1,986	5.34%	8.78%	9.71%
Total	19,742	21,118	20,450	100.00%	100.00%	100.00%

The racial makeup of the county was 88.1% White, 0.3% Black or African American, 0.9% American Indian and Alaska Native, 0.6% Asian, 4.2% from some other race, and 5.8% from two or more races. Hispanic or Latino residents of any race comprised 9.7% of the population.

There were 7,733 households in the county, of which 34.3% had children under the age of 18 living with them and 21.6% had a female householder with no spouse or partner present. About 26.4% of all households were made up of individuals and 10.4% had someone living alone who was 65 years of age or older.

There were 8,798 housing units, of which 12.1% were vacant. Among occupied housing units, 74.5% were owner-occupied and 25.5% were renter-occupied. The homeowner vacancy rate was 2.2% and the rental vacancy rate was 17.1%.

=== 2016 ancestry estimates ===
As of 2016 the largest self-reported ancestry groups in Uinta County, Wyoming are:

Largest ancestries	Percent
English (England)	28.3%
German (Germany)	18.9%
Irish (Republic of Ireland)	8.1%
American (United States)	5.6%
Scottish (Scotland)	5.4%
Italian (Italy)	3.8%
Swedish (Sweden)	4.1%
French (except Basque) (France)	3.3%
Dutch (Netherlands)	3.2%
Norwegian (Norway)	3.0%
Danish (Denmark)	2.5%
Welsh (Wales)	2.2%

=== 2010 census ===
As of the 2010 United States census, there were 21,118 people, 7,668 households, and 5,577 families in the county. The population density was 10.1 people per square mile (3.9 people/km^{2}). There were 8,713 housing units at an average density of 4.2 units per square mile (1.6 units/km^{2}). The racial makeup of the county was 92.4% white, 0.8% American Indian, 0.3% black or African American, 0.3% Asian, 0.2% Pacific islander, 4.1% from other races, and 2.0% from two or more races. Those of Hispanic or Latino origin made up 8.8% of the population. In terms of ancestry, 33.4% were English, 23.0% were German, 12.0% were Irish, 6.5% were Scottish, 5.1% were Scotch-Irish, and 3.3% were American.

Of the 7,668 households, 39.8% had children under the age of 18 living with them, 58.3% were married couples living together, 9.7% had a female householder with no husband present, 27.3% were non-families, and 22.6% of all households were made up of individuals. The average household size was 2.72 and the average family size was 3.19. The median age was 33.9 years.

The median income for a household in the county was $58,346 and the median income for a family was $68,949. Males had a median income of $54,766 versus $30,561 for females. The per capita income for the county was $24,460. About 8.2% of families and 12.1% of the population were below the poverty line, including 14.6% of those under age 18 and 7.7% of those age 65 or over.

=== 2000 census ===
As of the 2000 United States census, there were 19,742 people, 6,823 households, and 5,144 families in the county. The population density was 10 people per square mile (3.9 people/km^{2}). There were 8,011 housing units at an average density of 4 units per square mile (1.5 units/km^{2}). The racial makeup of the county was 94.32% White, 0.11% Black or African American, 0.87% Native American, 0.27% Asian, 0.07% Pacific Islander, 2.86% from other races, and 1.50% from two or more races. 5.34% of the population were Hispanic or Latino of any race. 27.7% were of English, 14.8% German, 8.3% American and 6.9% Irish ancestry.

There were 6,823 households, out of which 44.70% had children under the age of 18 living with them, 61.20% were married couples living together, 9.90% had a female householder with no husband present, and 24.60% were non-families. 20.90% of all households were made up of individuals, and 5.60% had someone living alone who was 65 years of age or older. The average household size was 2.84 and the average family size was 3.31.

The county population contained 33.50% under the age of 18, 9.00% from 18 to 24, 29.20% from 25 to 44, 21.40% from 45 to 64, and 7.00% who were 65 years of age or older. The median age was 31 years. For every 100 females there were 103.80 males. For every 100 females age 18 and over, there were 100.30 males.

The median income for a household in the county was $44,544, and the median income for a family was $49,520. Males had a median income of $37,500 versus $21,450 for females. The per capita income for the county was $16,994. About 7.80% of families and 9.90% of the population were below the poverty line, including 11.90% of those under age 18 and 7.30% of those age 65 or over.

== Religion ==
Religion in Uinta County, according to ARDA (2020)
1. LDS Church (49.5%)
2. Evangelical Churches (7.70%)
3. Mainline Protestant Churches (1.40%)
4. Black Protestant Churches (1.00%)
5. Catholic Church (2.00%)
6. Others (0.60%)
7. None* (37.8%)

A majority of residents describe themselves as Christian, with the Church of Jesus Christ of Latter-day Saints claiming slightly less than half the population as of 2020.

== Communities ==
=== City ===
- Evanston (county seat)

=== Towns ===
- Bear River
- Lyman
- Mountain View

=== Unincorporated communities ===
- Aspen
- Millburne
- Robertson

=== Ghost towns ===
- Almy
- Bear River City
- Fort Supply
- Piedmont

== Census-designated places ==
- Carter
- Fort Bridger
- Lonetree
- Robertson
- Urie

== Government and infrastructure ==
The Wyoming Department of Health Wyoming State Hospital, a psychiatric facility, is located in Evanston. The facility was operated by the Wyoming Board of Charities and Reform until that agency was dissolved as a result of a state constitutional amendment passed in November 1990.

Uinta County, like much of Wyoming, is powerfully Republican. The last Democratic presidential nominee to win the county was Lyndon Johnson in 1964.

United States presidential election results for Uinta County, Wyoming
Year	Republican		Democratic		Third party(ies)	
Year	No.	%	No.	%	No.	%
1892	965	47.65%	0	0.00%	1,060	52.35%
1896	907	34.34%	1,726	65.35%	8	0.30%
1900	2,102	54.60%	1,748	45.40%	0	0.00%
1904	2,768	63.52%	1,385	31.78%	205	4.70%
1908	2,525	53.08%	1,731	36.39%	501	10.53%
1912	717	37.30%	535	27.84%	670	34.86%
1916	822	37.81%	1,295	59.57%	57	2.62%
1920	1,194	55.82%	914	42.73%	31	1.45%
1924	1,126	45.51%	427	17.26%	921	37.23%
1928	1,439	58.31%	1,012	41.00%	17	0.69%
1932	1,250	42.26%	1,658	56.05%	50	1.69%
1936	1,015	33.67%	1,972	65.41%	28	0.93%
1940	1,335	39.84%	2,007	59.89%	9	0.27%
1944	1,305	42.66%	1,754	57.34%	0	0.00%
1948	1,239	42.75%	1,632	56.31%	27	0.93%
1952	1,801	55.45%	1,444	44.46%	3	0.09%
1956	1,742	56.87%	1,321	43.13%	0	0.00%
1960	1,606	50.09%	1,600	49.91%	0	0.00%
1964	1,186	38.07%	1,929	61.93%	0	0.00%
1968	1,510	52.36%	1,199	41.57%	175	6.07%
1972	2,011	67.03%	968	32.27%	21	0.70%
1976	2,124	55.73%	1,559	40.91%	128	3.36%
1980	2,738	65.96%	1,138	27.42%	275	6.62%
1984	4,075	75.31%	1,276	23.58%	60	1.11%
1988	3,464	62.97%	1,922	34.94%	115	2.09%
1992	2,701	39.12%	2,047	29.65%	2,157	31.24%
1996	3,471	48.09%	2,414	33.44%	1,333	18.47%
2000	5,469	73.73%	1,650	22.24%	299	4.03%
2004	6,081	75.25%	1,815	22.46%	185	2.29%
2008	5,763	68.75%	2,317	27.64%	303	3.61%
2012	6,615	77.47%	1,628	19.07%	296	3.47%
2016	6,154	72.66%	1,202	14.19%	1,114	13.15%
2020	7,496	79.73%	1,591	16.92%	315	3.35%
2024	7,282	80.12%	1,561	17.17%	246	2.71%

== See also ==
- National Register of Historic Places listings in Uinta County, Wyoming
- Uintatherium, a namesake fossil mammal discovered there
- Wyoming
  - List of cities and towns in Wyoming
  - List of counties in Wyoming
  - Wyoming statistical areas
