= National Register of Historic Places listings in Carbon County, Wyoming =

Location of Carbon County in Wyoming

This is a list of the National Register of Historic Places listings in Carbon County, Wyoming.

It is intended to be a complete list of the properties and districts on the National Register of Historic Places in Carbon County, Wyoming, United States. The locations of National Register properties and districts for which the latitude and longitude coordinates are included below, may be seen in a map.

There are 50 properties and districts listed on the National Register in the county, 1 of which is a National Historic Landmark.

This National Park Service list is complete through NPS recent listings posted March 6, 2026.

Contents: Counties in Wyoming
Albany - Big Horn - Campbell - Carbon - Converse - Crook - Fremont - Goshen - Hot Springs - Johnson - Laramie - Lincoln - Natrona - Niobrara - Park - Platte - Sheridan - Sublette - Sweetwater - Teton - Uinta - Washakie - Weston

== Current listings ==
	Name on the Register	Image	Date listed	Location	City or town	Description
1	Garrett Allen Prehistoric Site	Garrett Allen Prehistoric Site	August 7, 1974 (#74002023)	Address restricted	Elk Mountain	
2	Arlington	Arlington	November 25, 1983 (#83004268)	South of Interstate 80; 41°35′42″N 106°12′34″W	Arlington	
3	Jim Baker Cabin	Jim Baker Cabin	November 8, 1982 (#82001830)	Off Wyoming Highway 70; 41°01′36″N 107°26′57″W	Savery	
4	Bridger's Pass	Bridger's Pass	April 28, 1970 (#70000669)	Southwest of Rawlins; 41°33′03″N 107°26′04″W	Rawlins	
5	Brush Creek Work Center	Brush Creek Work Center	April 11, 1994 (#94000276)	Wyoming Highway 130 east of Saratoga, Medicine Bow National Forest; 41°20′45″N 106°32′14″W	Saratoga	Now the visitor center on the west side of the Snowy Range.
6	Carbon Cemetery	Carbon Cemetery	April 7, 2011 (#10001048)	County Road 115; 41°51′06″N 106°22′44″W	Carbon	
7	Como Bluff	Como Bluff	January 18, 1973 (#73001925)	On U.S. Route 30 along Como Ridge; 41°53′13″N 106°03′24″W	Medicine Bow	Extends into Albany County
8	DFU Elk Mountain Bridge	DFU Elk Mountain Bridge	February 22, 1985 (#85000416)	County Road 120-1; 41°41′12″N 106°24′34″W	Elk Mountain	Replaced in 2016
9	Divide Sheep Camp		February 9, 1984 (#84003635)	Northeast of Baggs; 41°06′54″N 107°17′19″W	Baggs	
10	DMJ Pick Bridge	DMJ Pick Bridge	February 22, 1985 (#85000418)	Next to Road CN6-508 (Pick Bridge Rd.) over the North Platte River; 41°32′22″N 106°52′51″W	Saratoga	
11	DML Butler Bridge	DML Butler Bridge	February 22, 1985 (#85000417)	County Road CN6-203 over the North Platte River; 41°15′23″N 106°38′22″W	Grand Encampment	
12	Downtown Rawlins Historic District	Downtown Rawlins Historic District	May 16, 1985 (#85001119)	Roughly 2nd to 6th Sts. and Front to Buffalo Sts.; also roughly along 5th St. from W. Spruce to W. Cedar; 41°47′16″N 107°14′18″W	Rawlins	Second set of boundaries represents a boundary increase
13	Duck Lake Station Site		December 6, 1978 (#78002825)	Address restricted	Wamsutter	
14	Elk Mountain Hotel	Elk Mountain Hotel	October 10, 1986 (#86003233)	Bridge St. and County Road 402; 41°41′15″N 106°24′40″W	Elk Mountain	
15	George Ferris Mansion	George Ferris Mansion	November 1, 1982 (#82001831)	607 W. Maple St. 41°47′29″N 107°14′34″W	Rawlins	
16	First State Bank of Baggs	First State Bank of Baggs	September 13, 1984 (#84003644)	10 S. Miles St. 41°02′09″N 107°39′31″W	Baggs	
17	Fort Halleck		April 28, 1970 (#70000668)	Southwest of Elk Mountain; 41°41′53″N 106°30′55″W	Elk Mountain	
18	Fort Steele	Fort Steele	April 16, 1969 (#69000185)	On the North Platte River at the Union Pacific railroad crossing 41°46′38″N 106°56′51″W	Fort Fred Steele	
19	The Fossil Cabin	The Fossil Cabin	April 11, 2008 (#08000289)	U.S. Route 30; 41°51′55″N 106°04′23″W	Medicine Bow	
20	France Memorial United Presbyterian Church	France Memorial United Presbyterian Church	May 14, 1984 (#84003649)	3rd and Cedar Sts. 41°47′17″N 107°14′14″W	Rawlins	
21	Grand Encampment Mining Region: Boston Wyoming Smelter Site	Grand Encampment Mining Region: Boston Wyoming Smelter Site	July 2, 1973 (#73001927)	East of Encampment on the Encampment River; 41°12′35″N 106°46′46″W	Grand Encampment	
22	Grand Encampment Mining Region: Ferris-Haggarty Mine Site		July 2, 1973 (#73001928)	West of Encampment; 41°11′15″N 107°04′26″W	Grand Encampment	
23	Hanna Community Hall	Hanna Community Hall	November 26, 1983 (#83004277)	Front St. 41°52′09″N 106°33′51″W	Hanna	
24	Headquarters Park Historic District	Headquarters Park Historic District	April 17, 2012 (#11000748)	Approximately 1 mile (1.6 km) north of WY 130 on USFS road 103; 41°20′16″N 106°21′41″W	Centennial	
25	Hotel Wolf	Hotel Wolf	November 21, 1974 (#74002024)	101 E. Bridge St. 41°27′17″N 106°48′24″W	Saratoga	
26	Hugus Hardware	Hugus Hardware	April 5, 1984 (#84003656)	123 E. Bridge St. 41°27′17″N 106°48′21″W	Saratoga	
27	Jack Creek Guard Station		May 15, 1986 (#86001101)	Off FDR 452; 41°16′23″N 107°06′32″W	Saratoga	
28	J. O. Ranch Rural Historic Landscape	J. O. Ranch Rural Historic Landscape	November 22, 2010 (#10000930)	24 miles (39 km) northeast of Baggs; 41°21′10″N 107°35′59″W	Baggs	
29	Medicine Bow Union Pacific Depot	Medicine Bow Union Pacific Depot	November 1, 1982 (#82001832)	405 Lincoln Highway; 41°53′43″N 106°11′59″W	Medicine Bow	
30	Medicine House Site		May 4, 2018 (#100002396)	Address restricted	Hanna vicinity	
31	Midway Station Site	Midway Station Site	December 6, 1978 (#78002819)	Address restricted	Rawlins	
32	Muddy Creek Archeological Complex	Muddy Creek Archeological Complex	May 16, 2012 (#12000291)	Address restricted	Medicine Bow	
33	Lora Webb Nichols House	Lora Webb Nichols House	July 25, 2023 (#100009172)	808 Winchell Ave. 41°12′25″N 106°47′46″W	Encampment	
33	Parco Historic District	Parco Historic District	May 6, 1987 (#87000918)	Roughly bounded by Monroe Ave., N. 4th St., Union and Lincoln Aves., and N. 9th St. 41°46′47″N 107°07′04″W	Sinclair	
34	Pine Grove Station Site		November 21, 1978 (#78002820)	Address restricted	Rawlins	Boundary increase approved February 8, 2021
35	Platte River Crossing		August 12, 1971 (#71000885)	17 miles (27 km) west of Saratoga; 41°34′21″N 106°57′45″W	Saratoga	
36	Powder Wash Archeological District	Powder Wash Archeological District	December 4, 2013 (#13000892)	Address restricted	Baggs	
37	Rawlins Residential Historic District	Rawlins Residential Historic District	September 9, 1999 (#99001141)	Roughly bounded by 8th St., Walnut St., Wyoming St., and Pine St. 41°47′28″N 107°14′19″W	Rawlins	
38	Ryan Ranch	Ryan Ranch	March 29, 1978 (#78002823)	South of Saratoga off Wyoming Highway 130; 41°22′21″N 106°43′01″W	Saratoga	
39	Sage Creek Station Site	Sage Creek Station Site	December 6, 1978 (#78002821)	Address restricted	Rawlins	
40	Saratoga Masonic Hall		March 29, 1978 (#78002824)	1st and Main Sts. 41°27′20″N 106°48′26″W	Saratoga	Probably demolished.
41	Site 32 SL-O Intermediate Field Historic District	Site 32 SL-O Intermediate Field Historic District	February 28, 2012 (#12000054)	0.9 miles (1.4 km) southeast of Medicine Bow off County Road 1; 41°53′11″N 106°11′18″W	Medicine Bow	Also known as the Medicine Bow Airport
42	Stockgrowers Bank	Stockgrowers Bank	June 25, 1986 (#86001393)	Third St. 41°02′04″N 107°32′08″W	Dixon	
43	Stone Wall Ranch	Stone Wall Ranch	September 29, 1986 (#86002329)	Star Rt., Box 1300; 41°01′10″N 107°25′13″W	Savery	
44	Tom Sun Ranch	Tom Sun Ranch	October 15, 1966 (#66000753)	6 miles (9.7 km) west of Independence Rock on Wyoming Highway 220; 42°26′40″N 107°14′36″W	Independence Rock	
45	Union Pacific Railroad Depot	Union Pacific Railroad Depot	September 2, 1993 (#93000883)	Junction of N. Front and 4th Sts. 41°47′13″N 107°14′18″W	Rawlins	
46	Virginian Hotel	Virginian Hotel	May 22, 1978 (#78002818)	U.S. Route 30; 41°53′46″N 106°11′59″W	Medicine Bow	
47	Washakie Station Site		December 12, 1978 (#78002822)	Off WYO 789, 30 miles (48 km) southwest of Rawlins; 41°28′48″N 107°41′39″W	Rawlins	
48	Willis House	Willis House	March 29, 2001 (#01000300)	621 Winchell Ave. 41°12′27″N 106°47′42″W	Grand Encampment	
49	Wyoming State Penitentiary District	Wyoming State Penitentiary District	May 26, 1983 (#83003360)	6th and Walnut Sts. 41°47′37″N 107°14′26″W	Rawlins	

== See also ==
- List of National Historic Landmarks in Wyoming
- National Register of Historic Places listings in Wyoming
