= Muddy Creek (Wyoming) =

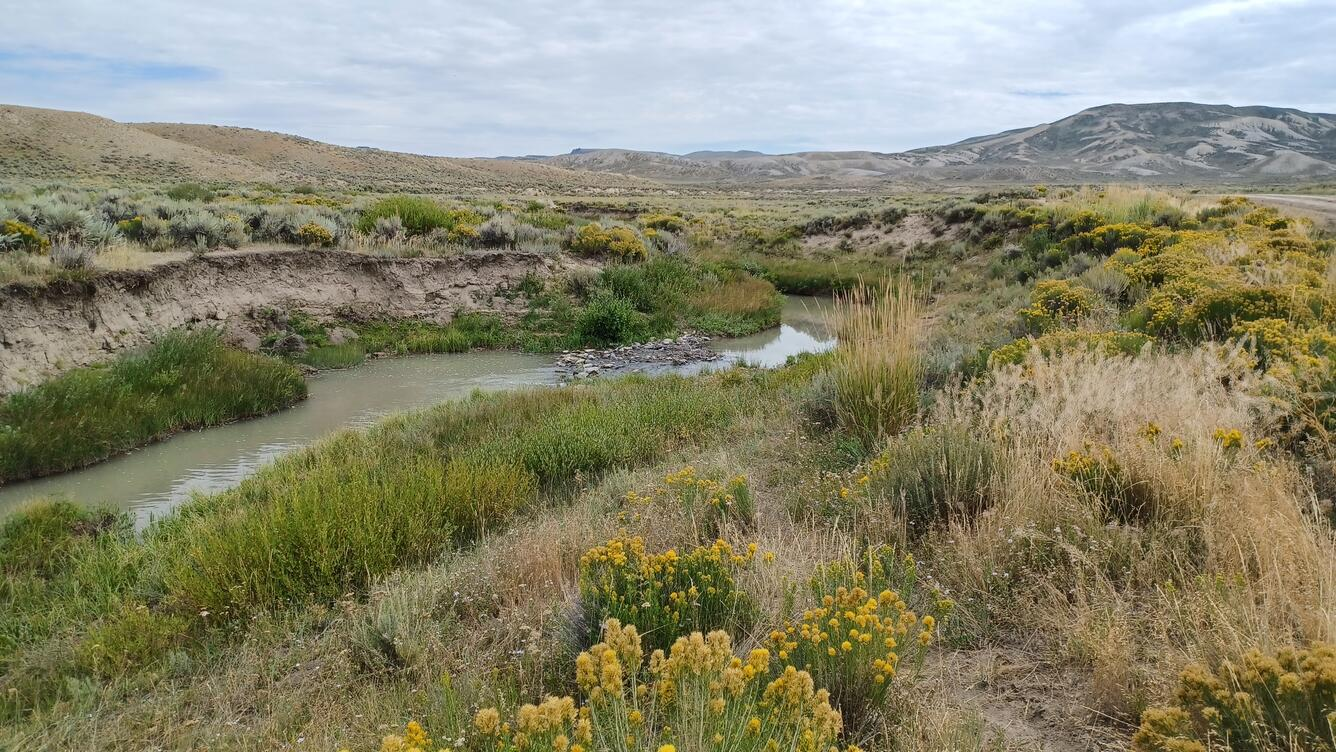
- Muddy Creek in Carbon County

Location
- Country: United States
- State: Wyoming
- County: Carbon

Physical characteristics
- Source
  - location: Sierra Madre Range
- Mouth
  - location: Little Snake River
  - coordinates: 41.3283°N 107.6534°W
- Basin size: 944 square miles (2,440 km^{2})

Basin features
- Progression: Little Snake River—Yampa River—Green River—Colorado River

Muddy Creek is a high-elevation, cold-desert stream located in south-central Wyoming, primarily within the Little Snake River Basin. It serves as a significant tributary to the Little Snake River and is part of the larger Colorado River drainage system. The creek is noted for its historical importance to 19th-century westward migration and its contemporary role in large-scale riparian restoration efforts.

The creek originates along the Continental Divide, along the Sierra Madre Range. It flows southwesterly before reaching its confluence with the Little Snake River near Baggs, Wyoming. The creek is known for its high sediment level. The creek's elevation at its lower monitoring stations is roughly 6,267 feet (1,910 m) above sea level.

The creek is the namesake of Muddy Gap, a prominent natural pass located at the junction of the Ferris and Whiskey Mountains. This gap serves as a low-elevation opening between the hills, through which the creek flows as it moves through Carbon County. The geological opening created by the creek's path has historically been a significant point for travel, eventually dictating the placement of the modern highway intersection for U.S. Route 287 and Wyoming Highway 220.

== History ==
Muddy Creek was used by travelers during the American westward expansion, including those using the Oregon and Mormon Trails. It served as a campsite for roughly 70,000 Mormon pioneers, as well as military travelers and those using the Pony Express. The Muddy Creek Historic Backway follows portions of these routes, passing through the ghost town of Peidmont.

The area contains the Muddy Creek Archeological Complex in Carbon County. This site includes a Late Plains Archaic bison kill and processing area belonging to the Besant Cultural Complex, dating back thousands of years.

== Ecology and conservation ==
Muddy Creek supports a variety of sensitive native fish species, including the Colorado River cutthroat trout, bluehead sucker, flannelmouth sucker, and roundtail chub. The area surrounding the creek is a critical winter range and a migration corridor for mule deer and elk, as well as habitat for the greater sage-grouse.

== Restoration efforts ==
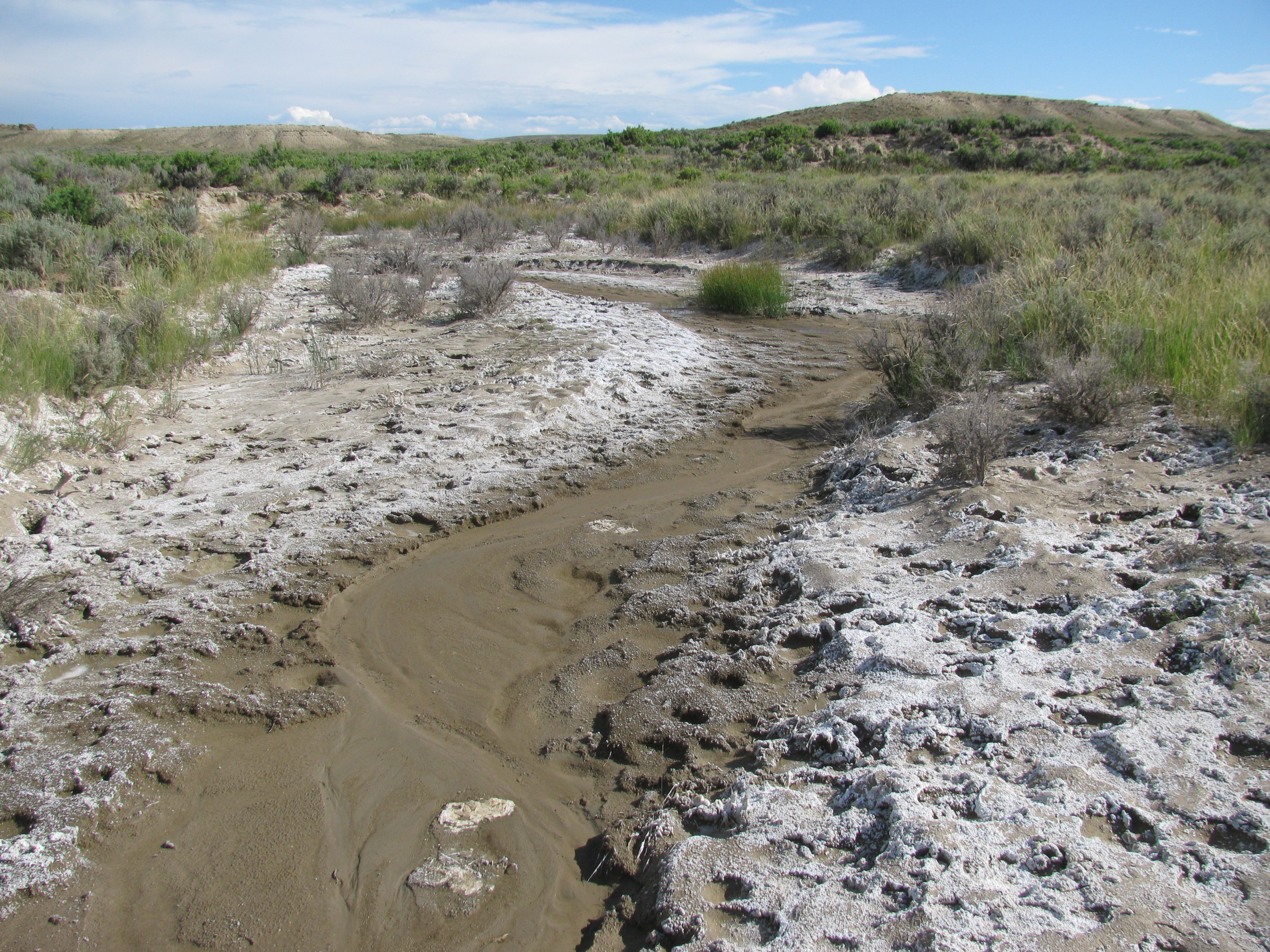
Natural salts in the soil in a tributary of Muddy Creek

In 1996, the Wyoming Department of Environmental Quality (WDEQ) listed segments of Muddy Creek as impaired under the Clean Water Act due to excessive sedimentation and habitat degradation. A coordinated resource management group—including the Bureau of Land Management and Trout Unlimited—implemented restoration projects such as the construction of the George Dew and Red Wash wetlands. Recent efforts have focused on "low-tech" restoration, including the installation of beaver dam analogs to raise the water table and stabilize stream banks.
