= Midway Station Site =

- U.S. National Register of Historic Places
- Nearest city: Rawlins, Wyoming
- Area: 1 acre (0.40 ha)
- Built: 1850
- NRHP reference No.: 78002819
- Added to NRHP: December 6, 1978

The Midway Station Site is a former way station on the Overland Trail in Carbon County, Wyoming. Built in 1850, the station was on a heavily traveled stage and emigration route, halfway between Saratoga and Walcott, providing its name. Nothing remains of the station beyond depressions in the earth. The site was placed on the National Register of Historic Places on December 6, 1978.
