= Jack Creek Guard Station =

- U.S. National Register of Historic Places
- Location within Wyoming Location within the United States
- Nearest city: Saratoga, Wyoming
- Coordinates: 41°16′23″N 107°6′32″W
- Area: 0.5 acres (0.20 ha)
- Built: 1933
- Built by: Evan J. Williams
- Architectural style: Rocky Mountain cabin style
- NRHP reference No.: 86001101
- Added to NRHP: May 15, 1986

The Jack Creek Guard Station is a ranger patrol cabin in Medicine Bow National Forest in Carbon County, Wyoming. The one-room log cabin was built by U.S. Forest Service district ranger Evan John Williams in 1933–34. It was built to Forest Service Plan A-4, featuring half-dovetailed corners and a deep front porch with a gabled wood shake roof. A stove is vented through a brick chimney at the back of the cabin.

In his career with the Forest Service Williams built or renovated five other ranger stations one hundred miles of trail, two fire lookouts and miles of fencing and telephone line. Williams died in 1970. His ashes are interred a short distance behind the cabin.

The Jack Creek Guard Station was placed on the National Register of Historic Places on May 15, 1986.
