= J. O. Ranch Rural Historic Landscape =

- J.O. Ranch Rural Historic Landscape
- U.S. National Register of Historic Places
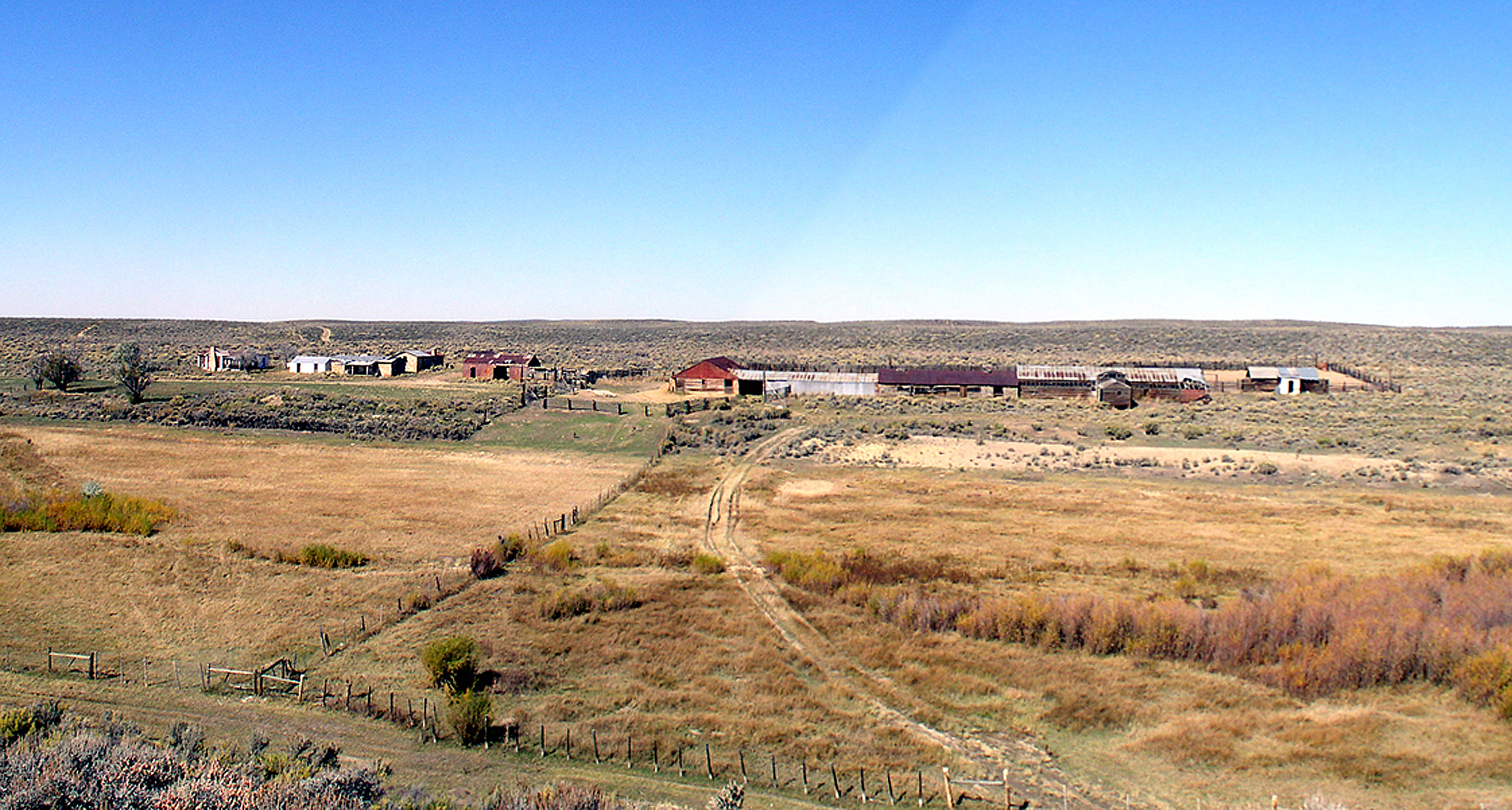

- Location within Wyoming Location within the United States
- Nearest city: Baggs, Wyoming
- Coordinates: 41°21′10″N 107°35′59″W
- NRHP reference No.: 10000930
- Added to NRHP: November 22, 2010

The J.O. Ranch Rural Historic Landscape is a historic area that incorporates the J.O. Ranch, established in 1885 in Carbon County, Wyoming. The ranch operated under the Spanish tradition of low-altitude winter ranch and high-altitude summer range. The ranching operation expanded greatly after the hard winter of 1886-87 devastated the cattle ranching industry in the area. Ranch buildings date from about 1890. Construction is log and stone, with many well-preserved structures.

The J.O. Ranch has continued as a working ranch since its establishment. It was listed on the National Register of Historic Places in on November 22, 2010.
