= Stone Wall Ranch =

- U.S. National Register of Historic Places
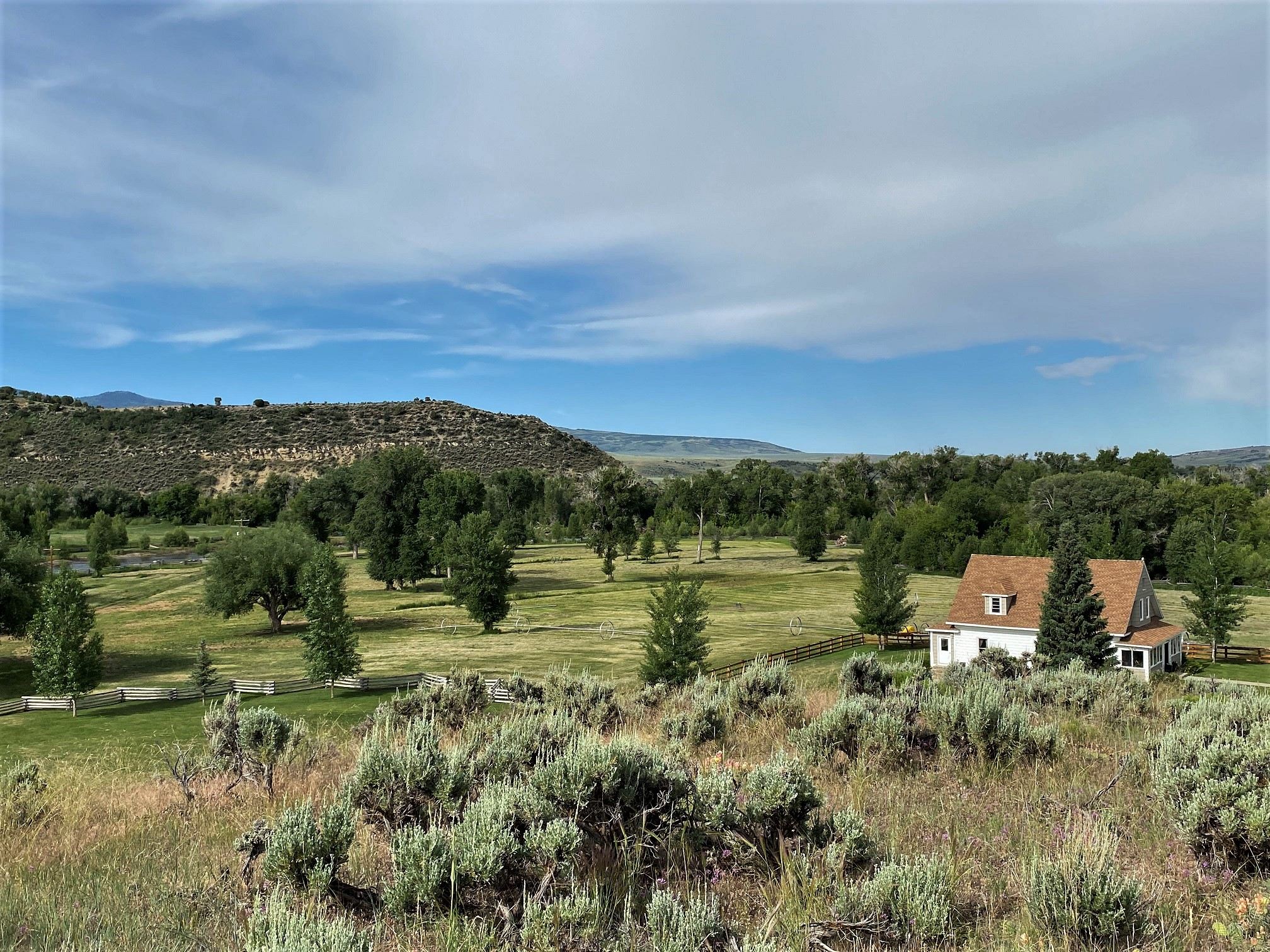
- The view towards the southeast in 2023

- Location within Wyoming Location within the United States
- Nearest city: Savery, Wyoming
- Coordinates: 41°01′10″N 107°25′13″W
- Area: 27 acres (11 ha)
- Built: 1873
- Built by: Noah Reader
- Architectural style: Shingle Style
- NRHP reference No.: 86002329
- Added to NRHP: September 29, 1986

The Stone Wall Ranch, also known as the Reader or Rasmussen Ranch, is a ranch in the Little Snake River valley of Carbon County, Wyoming, about 1.5 miles (2.4 km) from Savery. It was established by Noah and Hosannah Reader in 1871, the first permanent homestead in the valley. A temporary winter shelter was built in the winter of 1871-72, followed by a permanent structure in 1872-73 that survives in the ranch complex. The ranch was named for a nearby sandstone escarpment.

== Description ==
The main house was built circa 1916 of rock-faced concrete block on the ground floor, with a shingled second story. The shingled section uses Shingle Style detailing with a projecting bay under the gable flanked by curving returns, with an attic window between two inward-curving shingled jambs. The gabled roof incorporates plain and bayed dormers. A frosted front door depicting Niagara Falls is a notable ornament. Nearby was the original Reader cabin, built of logs laid over sandstone blocks. Other buildings include an ice house, a variety of sheds, a barn and corrals for livestock. The corrals use the Stone Wall escarpment to form one side of their enclosures. The ranch comprises about 160 acres (65 ha).

== History ==
Noah Reader (1821-1914) was born in Ohio. After participating in the California Gold Rush, working in lead mines in Illinois and farming in Iowa, Reader brought his wife Hosannah and sons George, William and Albert west, meaning to go to Montana. The family wintered on the Little Snake River in Wyoming and remained there. In 1931 the ranch passed to the Rasmussen family.

The Stone Wall Ranch was placed on the National Register of Historic Places on September 29, 1986. The original Reader cabin was donated to the Little Snake River Museum in 2007 and was moved to the museum in Savery in 2010, where it is on display.
