= Garrett Allen Prehistoric Site =

- U.S. National Register of Historic Places
- Nearest city: Elk Mountain, Wyoming
- Area: 8 acres (3.2 ha)
- NRHP reference No.: 74002023
- Added to NRHP: August 7, 1974

The Garrett Allen Prehistoric Site is an archeological site in Carbon County, Wyoming. The site was used in the Late Middle Prehistoric Period (1500 BC to 500 AD) and into the Late Prehistoric Period (500 AD to 1700AD). The site was used as an animal butchering location. Excavations by George Frison in the late 1960s and early 1970s revealed a continuous series of layers containing tools, stone flakes and projectile points. This site was placed on the National Register of Historic Places on August 7, 1974.
