= Divide Sheep Camp =

- U.S. National Register of Historic Places
- Location within Wyoming
- Nearest city: Baggs, Wyoming
- Coordinates: 41°6′54″N 107°17′19″W
- Area: 8 acres (3.2 ha)
- Built: 1914
- NRHP reference No.: 84003635
- Added to NRHP: February 9, 1984

The Divide Sheep Camp, also known as Niland's Cabins, is a ranch site on the Little Snake River in Carbon County, Wyoming, near Baggs. The camp was established in 1909 for summer use by sheepmen of the Niland-Tierney Sheep Company and others in the Little Snake valley. Eventually becoming the Divide Sheep Company the company operated until 1974, leaving the structures intact. The principal elements are a one-story log cabin with a finished attic, measuring about 25 feet (7.6 m) by 40 feet (12 m) built in the early 1920s, a log bunkhouse dating to about 1914, a spring house and a generator shed. The site represents a moderately-well-preserved turn-of-the-century sheep camp.

The Divide Sheep Camp was placed on the National Register of Historic Places on February 9, 1984.
