= Rawlins Residential Historic District =

Historic district in Wyoming, United States

- U.S. National Register of Historic Places
- U.S. Historic district
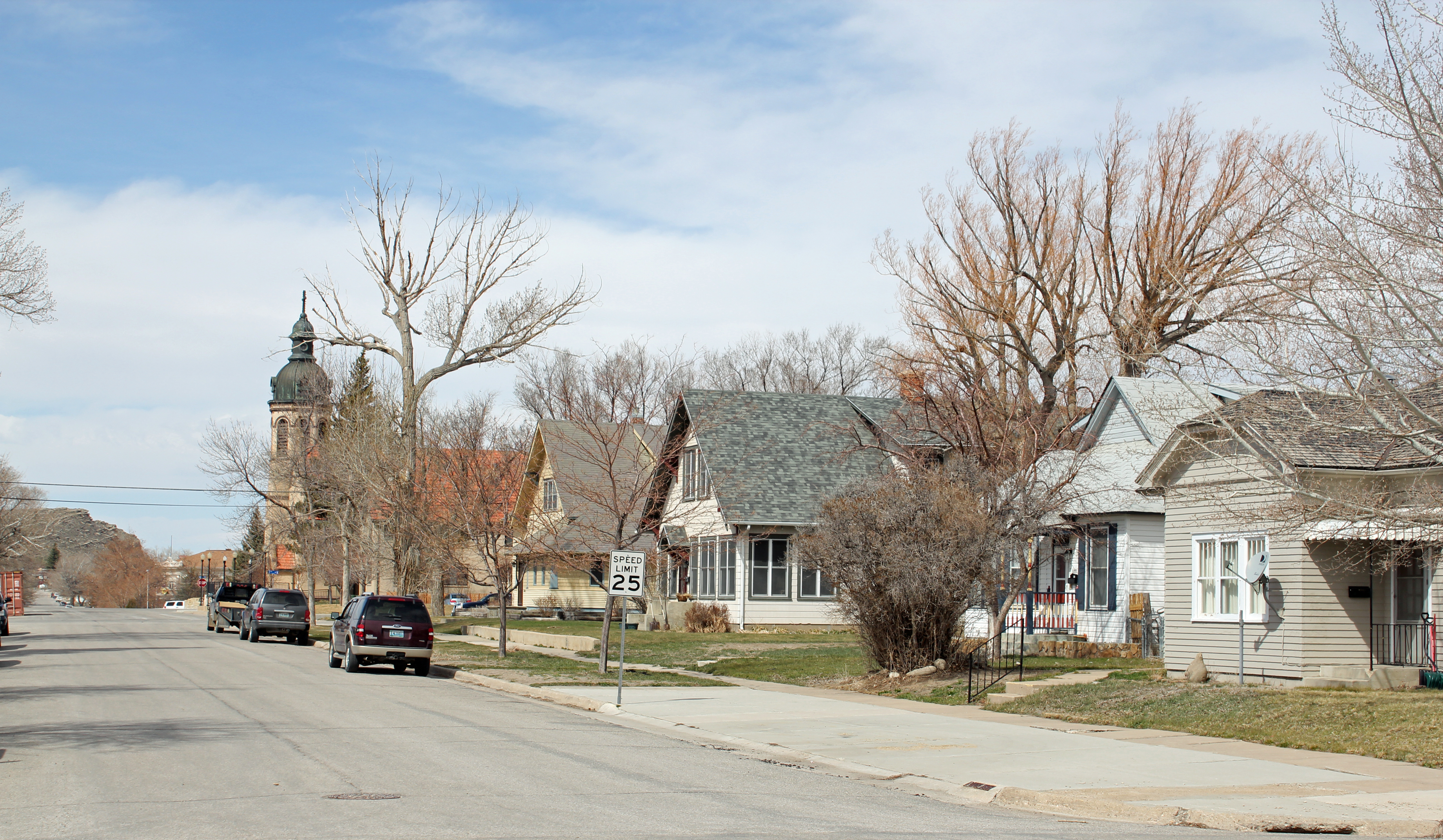
- 1st Street and East Pine in 2013

- Location within Wyoming
- Location: Roughly bounded by Eighth St., Walnut St., Wyoming St., and Pine St., Rawlins, Wyoming
- Coordinates: 41°47′28″N 107°14′19″W
- Area: 27 acres (11 ha)
- Architectural style: Bungalow/craftsman, Queen Anne
- NRHP reference No.: 99001141
- Added to NRHP: September 9, 1999

The Rawlins Residential Historic District abuts the north and east sides of the commercial district of Rawlins, Wyoming. United States. The area covers 15 blocks of small houses built between 1880 and 1915 in a variety of styles. The area was part of Union Pacific Railway property that was incorporated into Rawlins. One defining feature of the houses is a consistent use of locally quarried stone in foundations and landscape walls. Apart from the houses, St. Joseph's Catholic Church is also within the district. Styles include Queen Anne, cottage and bungalow style architecture.

George Ferris built a Queen Anne style mansion at 607 West Maple with the proceeds of his mining venture at the Ferris-Haggerty Mine, listed individually on the National Register of Historic Places. A number of sheep growers and bankers built houses in the district.

The Rawlins Residential Historic District was placed on the National Register of Historic Places on September 9, 1999.
