= Carbon County School District Number 2 =

Public school district in Wyoming, US

Carbon County School District #2 is a public school district in Saratoga, Wyoming, United States.

== Geography ==
Carbon County School District #2 serves the eastern portion of Carbon County, including the following communities:

- Incorporated places
  - Town of Elk Mountain
  - Town of Encampment
  - Town of Hanna
  - Town of Medicine Bow
  - Town of Riverside
  - Town of Saratoga
- Unincorporated places
  - Arlington
  - Walcott

== Schools ==
- Grades 7-12
  - H.E.M. Junior/Senior High School
  - Saratoga Middle/High School
- Grades K-6
  - Elk Mountain Elementary School
  - Hanna Elementary School
  - Medicine Bow Elementary School
  - Saratoga Elementary School
- Grades K-12
  - Encampment K-12 School

== Administration ==
The current superintendent of the district is Darrin Jennings who started his tenure in the 2022-23 school year.

== Student demographics ==
The following figures are as of May 1, 2025.

- Total District Enrollment: 576
- Student enrollment by gender
  - Male: 301 (52.26)
  - Female: 285 (47.74%)

== See also ==
- List of school districts in Wyoming
