= Hotel Wolf =

- U.S. National Register of Historic Places
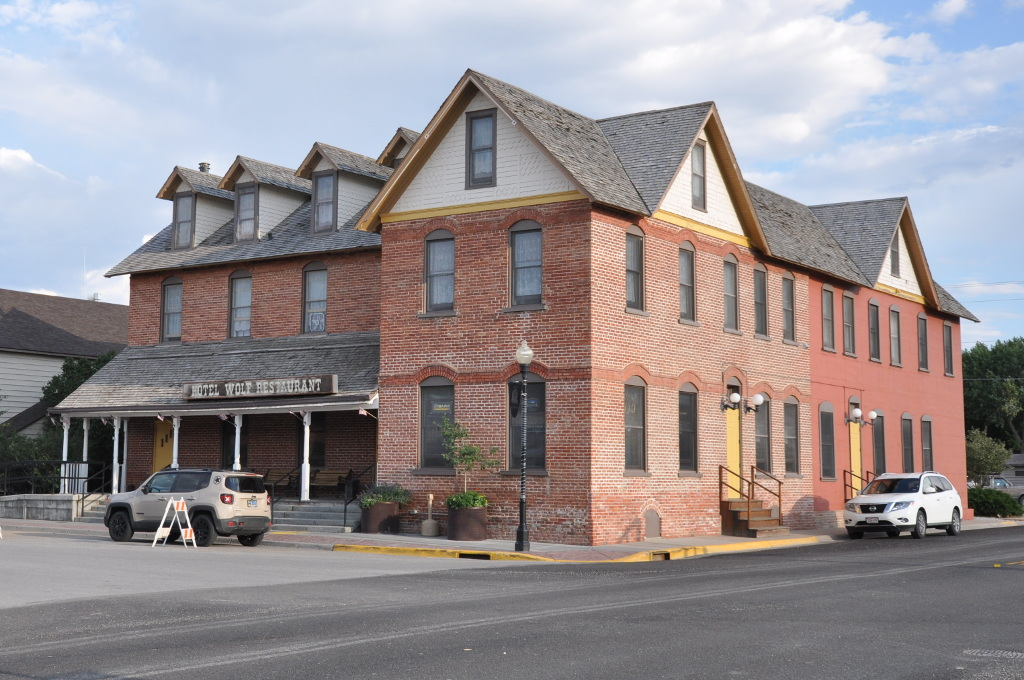

- Location within Wyoming
- Location: 101 E. Bridge St., Saratoga, Wyoming
- Coordinates: 41°27′17″N 106°48′24″W
- Area: 1 acre (0.40 ha)
- Built: 1893
- NRHP reference No.: 74002024
- Added to NRHP: November 21, 1974

The Hotel Wolf is a hotel and restaurant in Saratoga, Wyoming. The two-story brick building was built at an estimated cost of $6000 in 1893 for Frederick G. Wolf, a German immigrant who had operated liquor stores in Wyoming. It opened for dining with a banquet on New Year's Eve 1893. The hotel opened on January 10, 1894. Two years after Wolf's death in 1910 his widow Christina sold the property to George W. Sisson for $10,000. It continues to operate as a hotel and restaurant.

The L-shaped brick building has a steep gabled roof with similarly pointed dormers. The front extension to the right of the main porch features a corbeled band of bricks with slight arches at the two ground floor windows.

The Hotel Wolf was listed on the National Register of Historic Places on November 21, 1974.
