= Hugus Hardware =

- U.S. National Register of Historic Places
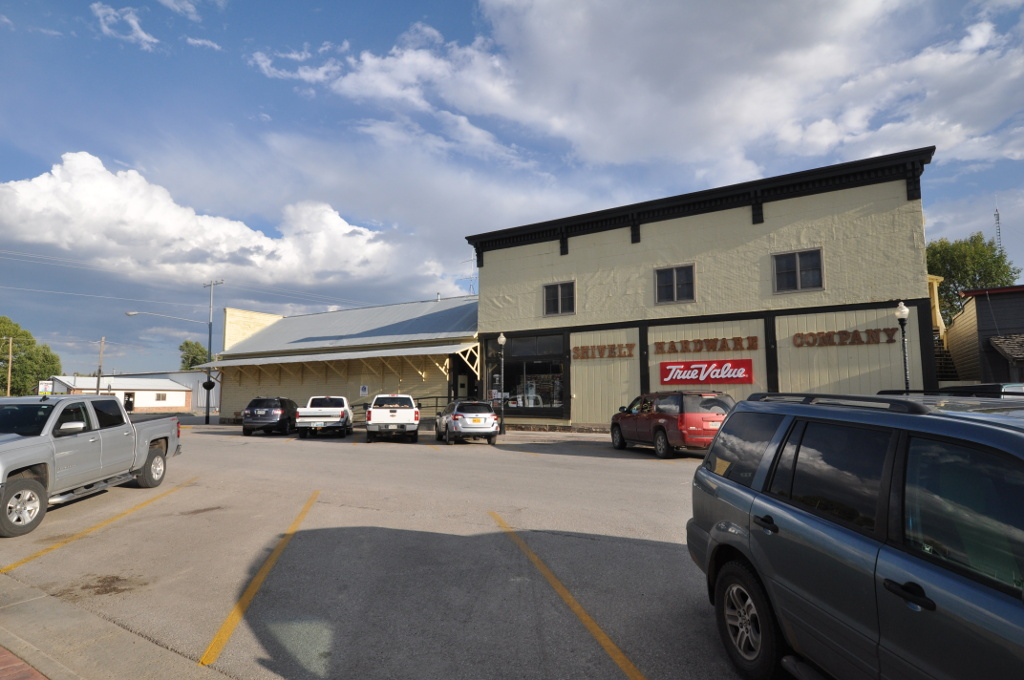

- Location within Wyoming Location within the United States
- Location: 123 E. Bridge St., Saratoga, Wyoming
- Coordinates: 41°27′17″N 106°48′21″W
- Built: 1888
- NRHP reference No.: 84003656
- Added to NRHP: April 05, 1984

The Hugus Hardware store, now known as Shively Hardware, is a significant commercial presence in downtown Saratoga, Wyoming. The establishment consists of two buildings. The original one-story portion was built in 1888, while the two-story section was built in 1889. Both are wood-frame structures.

The first building is a gable-roofed frame structure, sided with clapboards and roofed with corrugated metal. A plain false front covers the gable end, which is at right angles to the two-story section. A shed-roofed overhang continues down the side elevation to the 1889 building. The 1889 building has display windows flanked by iron pilasters. Siding is embossed metal in a brick pattern. The otherwise plain facade is capped by a bracketed and dentiled cornice, hiding a plain single-sloped roof.

The store was built by Wilbur B. Hugus, operator of a store at Fort Steele. Hugus' building housed a general store, a saloon and the Saratoga State Bank. The store was bought by the Cosgriff Brothers in 1899, expanding to the west with more frame construction due to a scarcity of bricks. The bank was located in this addition, and its safe remains in use. The store was bought by William Tilton about 1915, who sold the store in 1925 to his employee, Edward Shively, after Tilton had to cover his son's gambling debts. The Shively family has continued to manage the store.

The store was listed on the National Register of Historic Places in 1984.
