= Saratoga Masonic Hall =

- U.S. National Register of Historic Places
- Location within Wyoming
- Location: 1st and Main Sts., Saratoga, Wyoming
- Coordinates: 41°27′20″N 106°48′26″W
- Area: less than one acre
- Built: 1892
- NRHP reference No.: 78002824
- Added to NRHP: March 29, 1978

The Saratoga Masonic Hall is a two-story brick building in downtown Saratoga, Wyoming that houses Saratoga's Masonic lodge. Established in 1892, the lodge was the fourteenth to be established in Wyoming. After a time in rented space, the lodge bought the Couzens and Company Block in 1893, using the second floor for meetings and leasing the ground floor to storekeeper A. Johnson Dogget. From 1895 the ground floor was used as a school. The Masons allowed a variety of other organizations to use the building, including the Odd Fellows, Knights of Pythias, Pythian Sisters, Union Fraternal League, Modern Woodmen, Women of Woodcraft, Job's Daughters, the Republican Party and the Ku Klux Klan.

The building faces north with a three-bay facade. The rectangular brick structure has a single-slope roof sloping from front to back. Tall windows with segmental arches are on the second floor, with a glazed wood-framed storefront below. The sides and rear are strictly utilitarian. Large meeting halls occupy both floors.

The Saratoga Masonic Hall was listed on the National Register of Historic Places on March 29, 1978.
