= First State Bank of Baggs =

- U.S. National Register of Historic Places
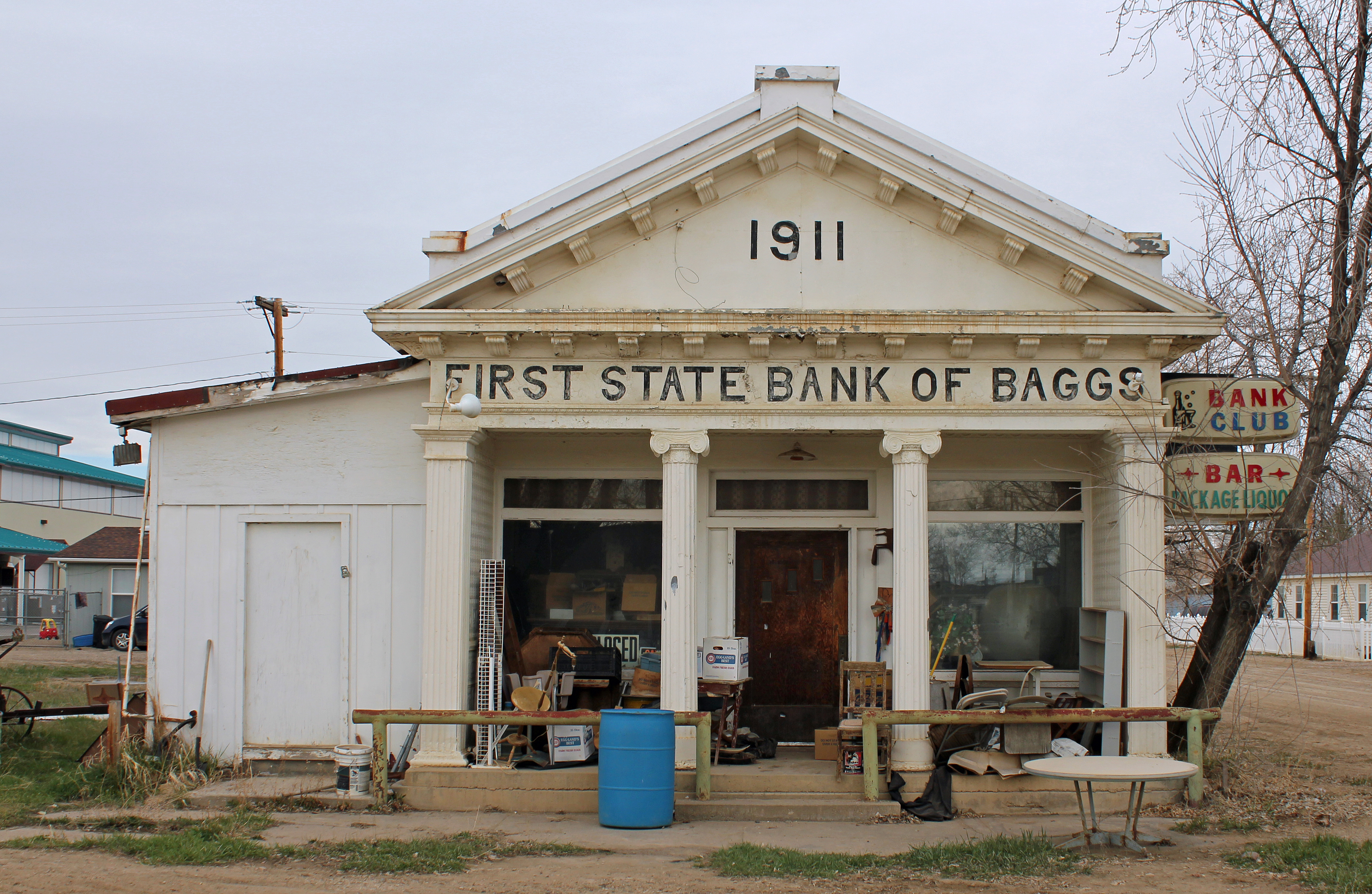
- The First State Bank of Baggs building in 2014

- Location within Wyoming
- Location: 10 S. Miles St., Baggs, Wyoming
- Coordinates: 41°2′9″N 107°39′31″W
- Area: less than one acre
- Built: 1907
- Architect: Vernon, Tom; Pierson, J. B.
- NRHP reference No.: 84003644
- Added to NRHP: September 13, 1984

The First State Bank of Baggs, also known as the Bank Club, is a building in Baggs, Wyoming, USA. Built in 1907–08 to house a bank, it is one of the relatively few original buildings left in Baggs. After the bank closed in 1924, the building became a doctor's office and, during Prohibition, it housed a bootleg liquor business. After Prohibition was repealed it became Baggs Liquor. In 1946, it was renamed the Bank Club Bar.

The one story log structure is covered by stamped sheet metal and has a Greek Revival pedimented front with Ionic columns in antis between Doric pilastered walls.

The First State Bank of Baggs was placed on the National Register of Historic Places on September 13, 1984.
