= Powder Wash Archeological District =

- Powder Wash Archaeological District
- U.S. National Register of Historic Places
- Nearest city: Baggs, Wyoming
- NRHP reference No.: 13000892
- Added to NRHP: December 4, 2013

The Powder Wash Archaeological District is a grouping of 19 rock art sites in the vicinity of Baggs, Wyoming. It's on the National Register of Historic Places.
