= Headquarters Park Historic District =

- U.S. National Register of Historic Places
- U.S. Historic district
- Location within Wyoming Location within the United States
- Nearest city: Centennial, Wyoming
- Coordinates: 41°20′16″N 106°21′41″W
- NRHP reference No.: 11000748
- Added to NRHP: April 17, 2012

The Headquarters Park Historic District encompasses the summer headquarters for the Leo Sheep Company, which focused on wool production, and the Rocky Mountain Sheep Company, which concentrated on lamb production, in Carbon County, Wyoming. The area was one of the major summer sheep and lamb-herding regions of Wyoming. Both companies were founded by Lee Emmit Vivion in 1903 and functioned for more than 65 years.

The Headquarters Park Historic District was listed on the National Register of Historic Places in on April 17, 2012.
