= Carbon County School District Number 1 =

Public school district in Wyoming, US

Carbon County School District #1 is a public school district based in Rawlins, Wyoming, United States.

== Geography ==
Carbon County School District #1 serves the western portion of Carbon County and a small portion of northeastern Sweetwater County, including the following communities:

- Incorporated places
  - Town of Baggs
  - Town of Bairoil
  - City of Rawlins
  - Town of Sinclair
- Unincorporated places
  - Savery

== Schools ==
- Grades 9-12
  - Rawlins High School
  - Rawlins “Victory” Cooperative High School (Alternative)
- Grades 6-8
  - Rawlins Middle School
- Grades K-5
  - Rawlins Elementary School
- Grades K-12
  - Little Snake River Valley School

== Administration ==
The current superintendent of Carbon County School District One is Mike Hamel who began his tenure in the 2017-18 school year.

== Student demographics ==
The following figures are as of March 18, 2025.

- Total District Enrollment: 1,628
- Student enrollment by gender
  - Male: 831 (51.04%)
  - Female: 797 (48.96%)

== See also ==
- List of school districts in Wyoming
