= France Memorial United Presbyterian Church =

Historic church in Wyoming, United States

- U.S. National Register of Historic Places
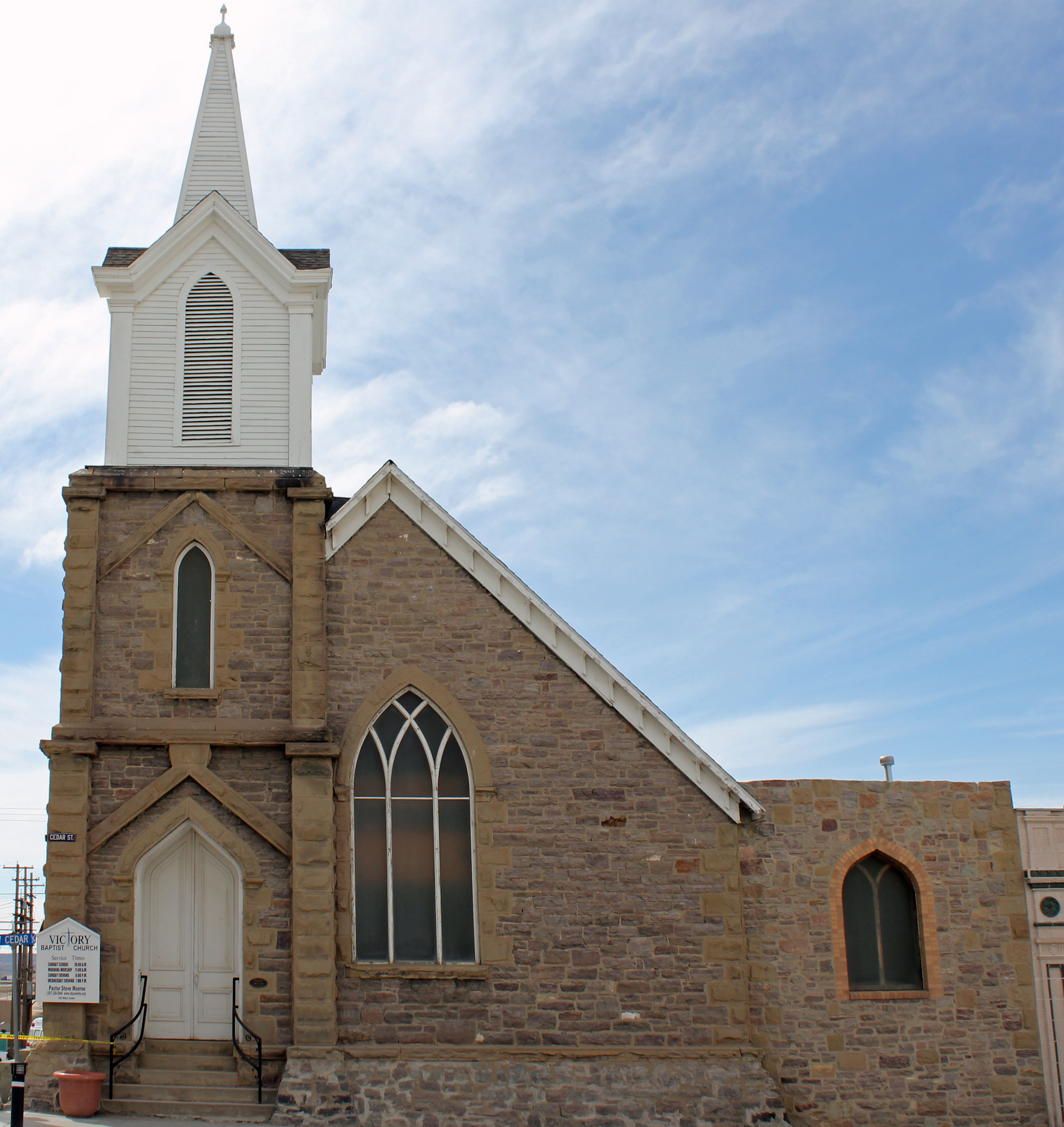
- The church in 2014.

- Location within Wyoming Location within the United States
- Location: 3rd and Cedar Sts., Rawlins, Wyoming
- Coordinates: 41°47′17″N 107°14′14″W
- Area: less than one acre
- Built: 1882
- Architectural style: Gothic Revival
- NRHP reference No.: 84003649
- Added to NRHP: May 14, 1984

France Memorial United Presbyterian Church is a historic Presbyterian church at 3rd and Cedar Streets in the city of Rawlins, Wyoming, United States. It was built in 1882. It is currently used by Victory Baptist Church.

== History ==
The Gothic Revival church building was constructed in 1882. Initially in 1870, the local Presbyterian congregation constructed one in Rawlins. Due to it being the only church in the town, worship was open to multidenominational Christians. By 1880, it was deemed as too small for the growing congregation as a result of the Union Pacific Railroad passing by. The congregation sold the old church for $300 to start funding the new one. The total cost was $7,800 which was funded by a mortgage. The mortgage was paid off in 1885 by the broker James France, husband of one of the parishioners Elizabeth France, paying the majority of it off with his own money.

The congregation decided to rename the church the "Mrs. Elizabeth France Presbyterian Church" as a tribute to the France family's donation. After her death, it was renamed the France Memorial United Presbyterian Church. It was added to the National Register of Historic Places in 1984. Ownership later transferred from the Presbyterians to the Baptists, though Victory Baptist Church that moved in, opted to retain the original name for the church building.

== Description ==
It is built of stone quarried from mountains north of the city and is the only stone church in Rawlins. Its 2-foot (0.61 m) walls enclose a 30 by 50 feet (9.1 by 15.2 m) space. It has a three-tiered tower with the top tier made of wood.
