= Walcott, Wyoming =

- Unincorporated community
- Location within the state of Wyoming Walcott, Wyoming (the United States)
- Coordinates: 41°45′40″N 106°50′42″W
- Country: United States
- State: Wyoming
- County: Carbon
- Elevation: 6,627 ft (2,020 m)
- Time zone: UTC-7 (Mountain (MST))
  - Summer (DST): UTC-6 (MDT)
- ZIP codes: 82335
- GNIS feature ID: 1595988

Walcott is an unincorporated community in central Carbon County, Wyoming, United States. It lies along local roads near Interstate 80 and the concurrent U.S. Routes 30 and 287, east of the city of Rawlins, the county seat of Carbon County. It had a post office with the ZIP code of 82335, that closed in 2007. It is named after Frank Wolcott, an officer in the Union Army, a law man and a rancher.

Walcott is located on the southern part of the Hanna Basin. The Hanna Basin is bounded to the north by the Shirley Mountains and Seminole mountains, to the east by Simpson Ridge, to the south by the Medicine Bow Mountains and Park Range, and to the west by the Rawlins Uplift. In 1868, the Union Pacific Railroad arrived at Walcott as part of the first transcontinental railroad. The second track, put along the first track, which was laid in 1868, was installed in 1912.

Public education in the community of Walcott is provided by Carbon County School District #2.
