= Ferris-Haggarty Mine Site =

- Grand Encampment Mining Region: Ferris-Haggerty Mine Site
- U.S. National Register of Historic Places
- Location within Wyoming Location within the United States
- Nearest city: Encampment, Wyoming
- Coordinates: 41°11′15″N 107°04′35″W
- Area: 160 acres (65 ha)
- Built: 1897
- NRHP reference No.: 73001928
- Added to NRHP: July 2, 1973

The Ferris-Haggerty Mine Site was one of the richest components of the Grand Encampment Mining District in Carbon County, Wyoming. The site was first exploited by Ed Haggerty, a prospector from Whitehaven, England, in 1897 when he established the Rudefeha Mine that would later be known as the Ferris-Haggerty Mine on a rich deposit of copper ore. Haggerty was backed by George Ferris and other investors, of whom all but Ferris dropped out. The partners sold an interest to Willis George Emerson, who raised investment funding for improvements to the mine. These facilities included an engineering feat of its day by developing a 16-mile (26 km) aerial tramway to carry high grade copper mined at the Ferris-Haggerty Mine (FHM) over the Continental Divide to the smelter in Encampment. The tramway was longest aerial tramway the world had ever seen. The mine was eventually acquired by the North American Copper Company for $1,000,000 Million. By 1904 the mine had produced $1.4 million in copper ore, and was sold to the Penn-Wyoming Copper Company. However, even with copper prices peaking in 1907, the company had difficulty making a profit from the remote mine site. The company was over-capitalized and under-insured and was suffered devastating fires at the mine site in March 1906 and May 1907 which halted production. Business disputes and a fall in copper prices prevented re-opening of the mine even after it was rebuilt. Machinery was salvaged after a foreclosure in 1913. A total of 23 million pounds of copper ore was extracted from the mine during its life.

The George Ferris Mansion in Rawlins, Wyoming was built with Ferris' proceeds from the mine, though George Ferris was killed in a carriage accident near the mine in 1900.

The Ferris-Haggerty Mine Site was placed on the National Register of Historic Places on July 2, 1973.

The Ferris-Haggarty Mine was purchased outright by Ferris-Haggarty Mining Corporation, a Colorado corporation, 24 April 2015. FHMC has plans underway and in process to place this very rich mineral property back into production in the very near future. Current in-ground asset valuation for its in-situ reserves and down dip potential resources are estimated at more than US$9 billion.
