= Muddy Creek Archeological Complex =

- U.S. National Register of Historic Places
- Architectural style: May 16, 2012
- NRHP reference No.: 12000291

The Muddy Creek Archeological Complex is an archeological complex located in Carbon County, Wyoming. The complex's three sites date to the Late Plains Archaic period. Stone points place the users of the site in the Besant Cultural Complex, representing one of the southernmost Besant sites. The sites were bison hunting and processing locations, featuring remains as well as tipi rings. The complex was placed on the National Register of Historic Places on May 16, 2012.
