= Hanna, Wyoming =

- Town
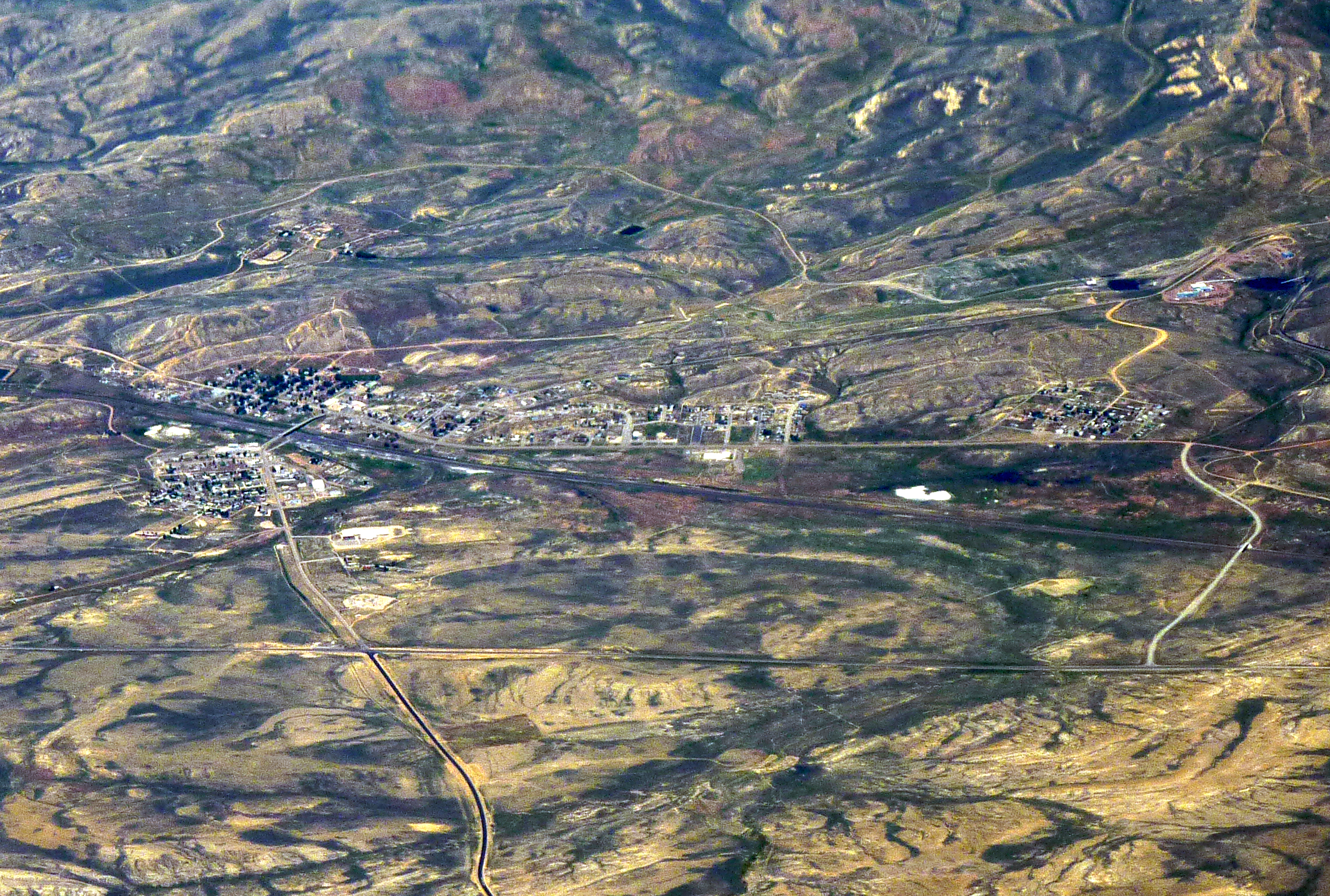
- Aerial view of Hanna and surrounding area

- Location of Hanna in Carbon County, Wyoming.
- Coordinates: 41°52′24″N 106°33′25″W
- Country: United States
- State: Wyoming
- County: Carbon

Area
  - Total: 2.05 sq mi (5.30 km^{2})
  - Land: 2.05 sq mi (5.30 km^{2})
  - Water: 0 sq mi (0.00 km^{2})
- Elevation: 6,818 ft (2,078 m)

Population (2020)
  - Total: 683
  - Density: 376/sq mi (145.2/km^{2})
- Time zone: UTC-7 (Mountain (MST))
  - Summer (DST): UTC-6 (MDT)
- ZIP code: 82327
- Area code: 307
- GNIS feature ID: 2412725
- FIPS code: 56-35335
- Website: www.townofhanna.com

Hanna is a town in Carbon County, Wyoming, United States. The population was 683 at the 2020 census. The town was started as a coal supply location for the Union Pacific Railroad. Much of the old town is built on top of the former workings of the Hanna No. 4 mine. On December 18, 1979, the Town of Hanna annexed the adjacent Town of Elmo. The population peaked at 2,288 in 1980 and has declined as local coal mines have ceased operation.

== Geography ==
According to the United States Census Bureau, the town has a total area of 2.05 square miles (5.31 km^{2}), all land.

== Demographics ==
Historical population
Census	Pop.	Note	%±
1940	1,127		—
1950	1,326		17.7%
1960	625		−52.9%
1970	460		−26.4%
1980	2,288		397.4%
1990	1,076		−53.0%
2000	873		−18.9%
2010	841		−3.7%
2020	683		−18.8%
2025 (est.)	663	▼	−2.9%
U.S. Decennial Census

=== 2010 census ===
As of the census of 2010, there were 841 people, 346 households, and 232 families living in the town. The population density was 410.2 inhabitants per square mile (158.4/km^{2}). There were 497 housing units at an average density of 242.4 per square mile (93.6/km^{2}). The racial makeup of the town was 95.6% White, 0.7% African American, 0.6% Native American, 1.2% from other races, and 1.9% from two or more races. Hispanic or Latino of any race were 4.0% of the population.

There were 346 households, of which 33.2% had children under the age of 18 living with them, 55.8% were married couples living together, 7.5% had a female householder with no husband present, 3.8% had a male householder with no wife present, and 32.9% were non-families. 28.6% of all households were made up of individuals, and 14.1% had someone living alone who was 65 years of age or older. The average household size was 2.43 and the average family size was 2.97.

The median age in the town was 39.2 years. 26.3% of residents were under the age of 18; 5.9% were between the ages of 18 and 24; 23.7% were from 25 to 44; 27.1% were from 45 to 64; and 17% were 65 years of age or older. The gender makeup of the town was 50.5% male and 49.5% female.

=== 2000 census ===
As of the census of 2000, there were 873 people, 367 households, and 245 families living in the town. The population density was 426.9 people per square mile (165.2/km^{2}). There were 514 housing units at an average density of 251.3 per square mile (97.3/km^{2}). The racial makeup of the town was 95.53% White, 0.23% African American, 0.11% Asian, 1.60% from other races, and 2.52% from two or more races. Hispanic or Latino of any race were 5.50% of the population.

There were 367 households, out of which 27.2% had children under the age of 18 living with them, 53.7% were married couples living together, 9.0% had a female householder with no husband present, and 33.0% were non-families. 27.5% of all households were made up of individuals, and 12.3% had someone living alone who was 65 years of age or older. The average household size was 2.38 and the average family size was 2.87.

In the town, the population was spread out, with 25.7% under the age of 18, 6.0% from 18 to 24, 23.6% from 25 to 44, 30.1% from 45 to 64, and 14.7% who were 65 years of age or older. The median age was 42 years. For every 100 females, there were 105.9 males. For every 100 females age 18 and over, there were 96.7 males.

The median income for a household in the town was $36,364, and the median income for a family was $39,219. Males had a median income of $41,000 versus $22,917 for females. The per capita income for the town was $16,062. About 18.4% of families and 20.4% of the population were below the poverty line, including 29.6% of those under age 18 and 7.5% of those age 65 or over.

== Education ==
Public education in the town of Hanna is provided by Carbon County School District #2. Zoned campuses include Hanna Elementary School (grades K-6) and H.E.M. Junior/Senior High School (grades 7–12).

Hanna has a public library, a branch of the Carbon County Library System.

== Government ==
Hanna has a Mayor/Council form of government. A council consisting of four elected members is headed by the office of the mayor. The current mayor of Hanna is Charlie Gorge, who took office in January 2025, after defeating appointed mayor Jason Nordquist in a special election to finish the remaining two years of former mayor Jon Ostling’s term.

List of Former/Current Mayors

1. Rick Kinder/ In office from 2007-2011

2. Tony Poulos/ In office from 2011-2019

3. Lois Buchanan/ In office from 2019-2023

4. Jon Ostling/ In office from 2023-2024

5. Jayson Nordquist/ In office from 2024-2025

6. Charlie Gorge/ In office from 2025–present

== Mine accidents ==
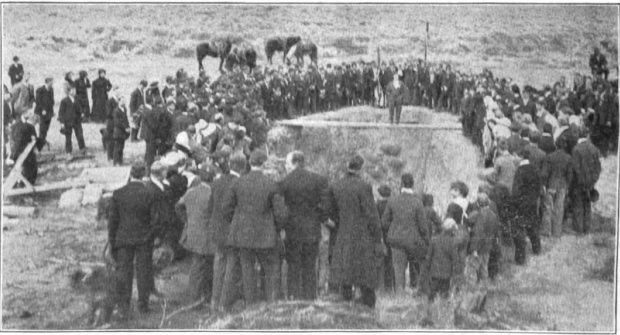
Memorial services held at Mine No. 1 for the victims of the 1908 disaster on March 28, 1910

In June 1903, at 10:30 a.m., an underground explosion occurred in the Hanna No.1 Colliery. The explosion was thought to have originated at the end of the stope, one and a half miles underground, blocking escape for the majority of workers. Of the 215 men on site, only 46 survived — the majority of victims being Finnish immigrants and black workers. The town's original grave site was far too small to handle such a large body count, and the town was forced to establish the Hanna Cemetery to bury the bodies, three miles (5 km) outside of the town. A later disaster at Mine No. 1 occurred on March 28, 1908.

== See also ==
- List of municipalities in Wyoming
