= Elk Mountain, Wyoming =

- Town
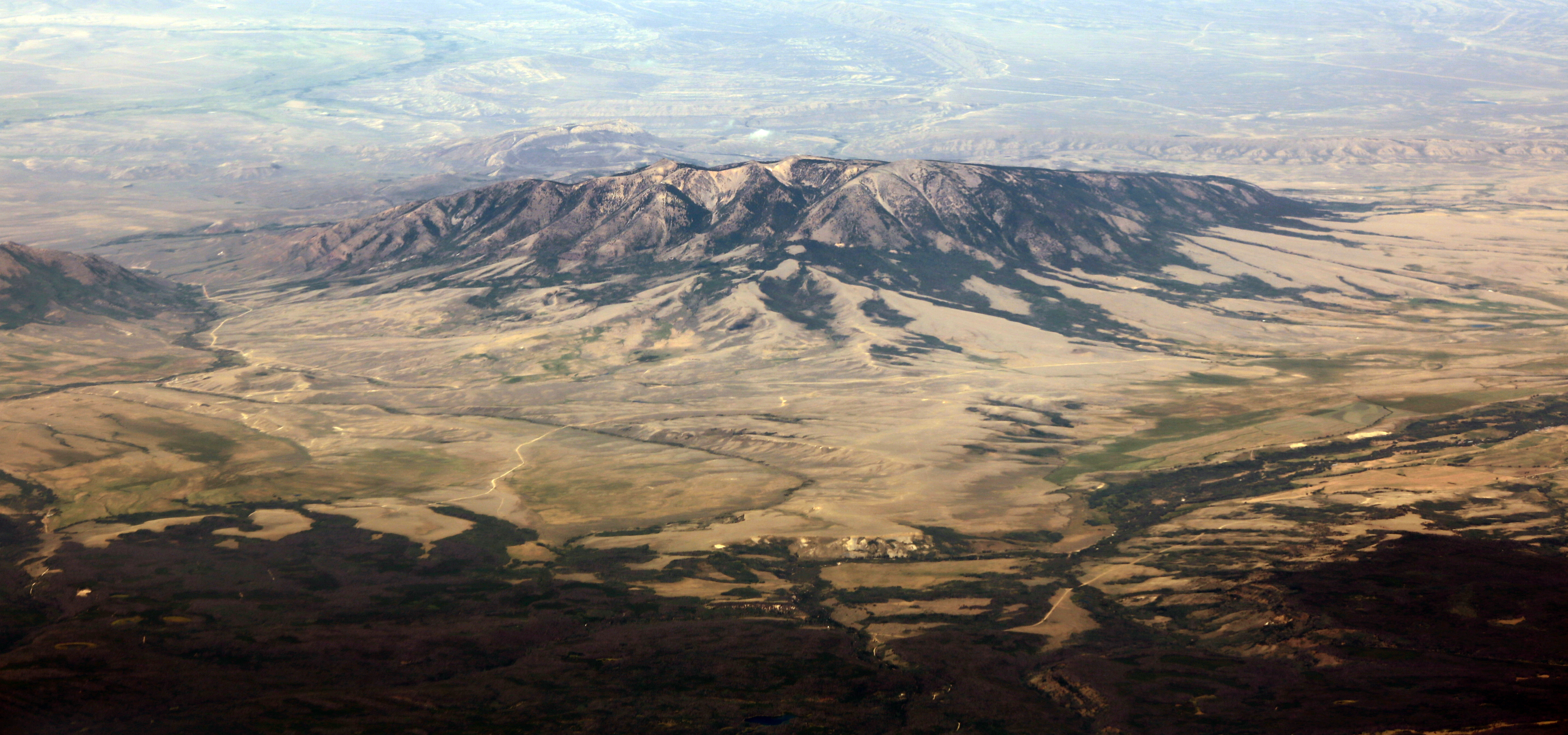
- Aerial photo of Elk Mountain, looking northeast

- Location of Elk Mountain in Carbon County, Wyoming.
- Coordinates: 41°41′18″N 106°24′49″W
- Country: United States
- State: Wyoming
- County: Carbon
- Incorporated: October 1909

Area
  - Total: 0.28 sq mi (0.72 km^{2})
  - Land: 0.28 sq mi (0.72 km^{2})
  - Water: 0 sq mi (0.00 km^{2})
- Elevation: 7,264 ft (2,214 m)

Population (2020)
  - Total: 150
  - Density: 668.8/sq mi (258.22/km^{2})
- Time zone: UTC-7 (Mountain (MST))
  - Summer (DST): UTC-6 (MDT)
- ZIP code: 82324
- Area code: 307
- GNIS feature ID: 2412475
- FIPS code: 56-24025
- Website: www.townofelkmountain.com

Elk Mountain is a town in Carbon County, Wyoming, United States. The population was 150 at the 2020 census. The town takes its name from the mountain 7 miles (11 km) to its southwest.

== History ==
Elk Mountain was a resting spot, the Elk Mountain Station, for early American pioneers in wagon trains heading west on the Overland Trail. Heading west, the travelers came from the Rock Creek Overland Stage Station. The Stage Station and the pioneers selected the site because of the good water year-round from the Medicine Bow River. There are many willow and cottonwood trees. It was also used as a route for the Overland Stage and Mail from 1862 to 1869, which ran from Denver to Salt Lake. From Elk Mountain, travelers moved west on the Overland Trail to Fort Halleck.

The post office was established in 1877. The town was incorporated in 1909.

In the 1940s and '50s the town was home to the Elk Mountain Hotel and Garden Spot Pavilion. National acts like Hank Thompson and Louis Armstrong played there. The Elk Mountain Hotel is still there, though the pavilion is gone.

== Geography ==
According to the United States Census Bureau, the town has a total area of 0.28 square miles (0.73 km^{2}), which consists entirely of land.

=== Climate ===
Climate data for Elk Mountain, Wyoming, 1991–2020 normals
Month	Jan	Feb	Mar	Apr	May	Jun	Jul	Aug	Sep	Oct	Nov	Dec	Year
Mean daily maximum °F (°C)	34.7 (1.5)	36.5 (2.5)	44.5 (6.9)	52.1 (11.2)	62.1 (16.7)	74.6 (23.7)	82.2 (27.9)	80.0 (26.7)	71.3 (21.8)	58.0 (14.4)	44.2 (6.8)	35.0 (1.7)	56.3 (13.5)
Daily mean °F (°C)	24.6 (−4.1)	25.8 (−3.4)	33.5 (0.8)	39.8 (4.3)	48.8 (9.3)	58.9 (14.9)	65.9 (18.8)	63.9 (17.7)	55.8 (13.2)	44.6 (7.0)	33.2 (0.7)	24.9 (−3.9)	43.3 (6.3)
Mean daily minimum °F (°C)	14.6 (−9.7)	15.0 (−9.4)	22.5 (−5.3)	27.5 (−2.5)	35.5 (1.9)	43.1 (6.2)	49.6 (9.8)	47.7 (8.7)	40.2 (4.6)	31.3 (−0.4)	22.2 (−5.4)	14.8 (−9.6)	30.3 (−0.9)
Average precipitation inches (mm)	0.67 (17)	0.80 (20)	1.27 (32)	1.54 (39)	1.78 (45)	1.05 (27)	0.86 (22)	0.74 (19)	1.10 (28)	1.32 (34)	0.89 (23)	0.90 (23)	12.92 (329)
Average snowfall inches (cm)	9.0 (23)	15.1 (38)	13.2 (34)	17.0 (43)	5.1 (13)	0.0 (0.0)	0.0 (0.0)	0.0 (0.0)	0.4 (1.0)	11.6 (29)	9.4 (24)	12.5 (32)	93.3 (237)
Average precipitation days (≥ 0.01 in)	5.0	5.4	5.6	7.5	6.9	4.2	4.1	3.8	4.4	5.0	5.4	6.2	63.5
Average snowy days (≥ 0.1 in)	3.3	4.2	3.6	4.4	1.3	0.0	0.0	0.0	0.3	2.0	3.0	4.8	26.9
Source: NOAA

== Demographics ==
Historical population
Census	Pop.	Note	%±
1910	98		—
1920	89		−9.2%
1930	54		−39.3%
1940	107		98.1%
1950	196		83.2%
1960	190		−3.1%
1970	127		−33.2%
1980	338		166.1%
1990	174		−48.5%
2000	192		10.3%
2010	191		−0.5%
2020	150		−21.5%
2025 (est.)	147	▼	−2.0%
U.S. Decennial Census

=== 2010 census ===
As of the census of 2010, there were 191 people, 76 households, and 58 families residing in the town. The population density was 682.1 inhabitants per square mile (263.4/km^{2}). There were 109 housing units at an average density of 389.3 per square mile (150.3/km^{2}). The racial makeup of the town was 98.4% White, 1.0% African American, and 0.5% Native American. Hispanic or Latino of any race were 0.5% of the population.

There were 76 households, of which 28.9% had children under the age of 18 living with them, 72.4% were married couples living together, 1.3% had a female householder with no husband present, 2.6% had a male householder with no wife present, and 23.7% were non-families. 23.7% of all households were made up of individuals, and 13.2% had someone living alone who was 65 years of age or older. The average household size was 2.51 and the average family size was 2.95.

The median age in the town was 45.1 years. 20.4% of residents were under the age of 18; 6.4% were between the ages of 18 and 24; 23.1% were from 25 to 44; 32% were from 45 to 64; and 18.3% were 65 years of age or older. The gender makeup of the town was 49.2% male and 50.8% female.

=== 2000 census ===
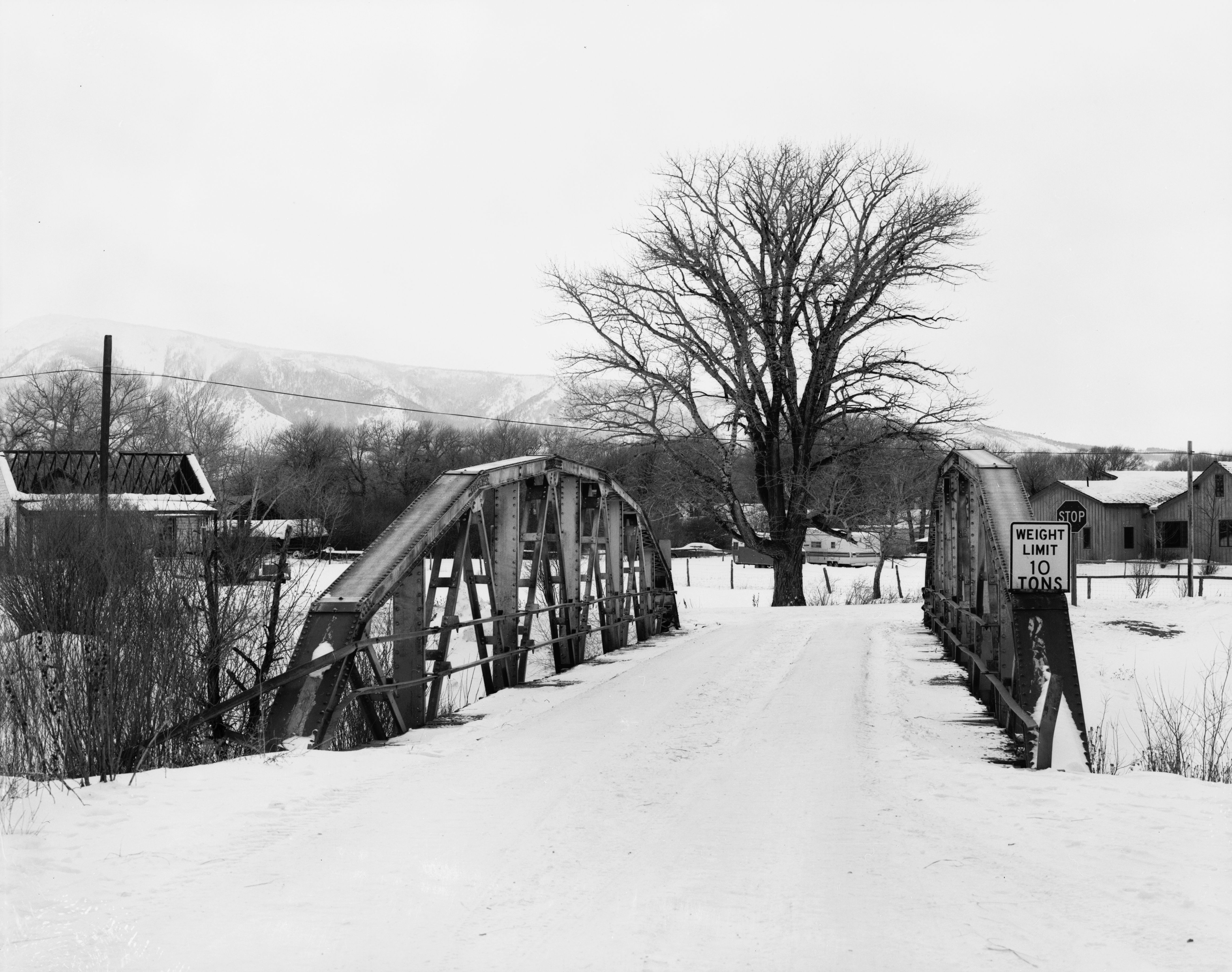
Elk Mountain Bridge

As of the census of 2000, there were 192 people, 74 households, and 52 families residing in the town. The population density was 676.5 people per square mile (264.8/km^{2}). There were 116 housing units at an average density of 408.7 per square mile (160.0/km^{2}). The racial makeup of the town was 95.83% White, 1.04% Native American, 2.08% from other races, and 1.04% from two or more races. Hispanic or Latino of any race were 5.21% of the population.

There were 74 households, out of which 35.1% had children under the age of 18 living with them, 63.5% were married couples living together, 5.4% had a female householder with no husband present, and 29.7% were non-families. 28.4% of all households were made up of individuals, and 14.9% had someone living alone who was 65 years of age or older. The average household size was 2.59 and the average family size was 3.17.

In the town, the population was spread out, with 30.2% under the age of 18, 4.2% from 18 to 24, 26.0% from 25 to 44, 25.5% from 45 to 64, and 14.1% who were 65 years of age or older. The median age was 36 years. For every 100 females, there were 120.7 males. For every 100 females age 18 and over, there were 106.2 males.

The median income for a household in the town was $40,313, and the median income for a family was $46,042. Males had a median income of $27,500 versus $23,125 for females. The per capita income for the town was $14,463. None of the families and 4.3% of the population were living below the poverty line, including no under eighteens and 14.3% of those over 64.

== Education ==
Public education in the town of Elk Mountain is provided by Carbon County School District #2. Zoned campuses include Elk Mountain Elementary School (grades K-6) and H.E.M. Junior/Senior High School (grades 7–12).

Elk Mountain has a public library, a branch of the Carbon County Library System.

== Government ==
Elk Mountain's current system of government is mayor-council government. Four council members are headed by the office of the Mayor. The current mayor is Morgan Irene. Irene first took office in January 2011 after his narrow election victory against incumbent mayor Rick Christopherson. Irene's current term ends in 2026.

List of Mayors

- Barbara Bonner - 1995 to 2007
- Rick Christopherson - 2007 to 2011
- Morgan Irene - 2011 to present

== See also ==
- Rock Creek Overland Stage Station
