= Savery, Wyoming =

- Unincorporated community
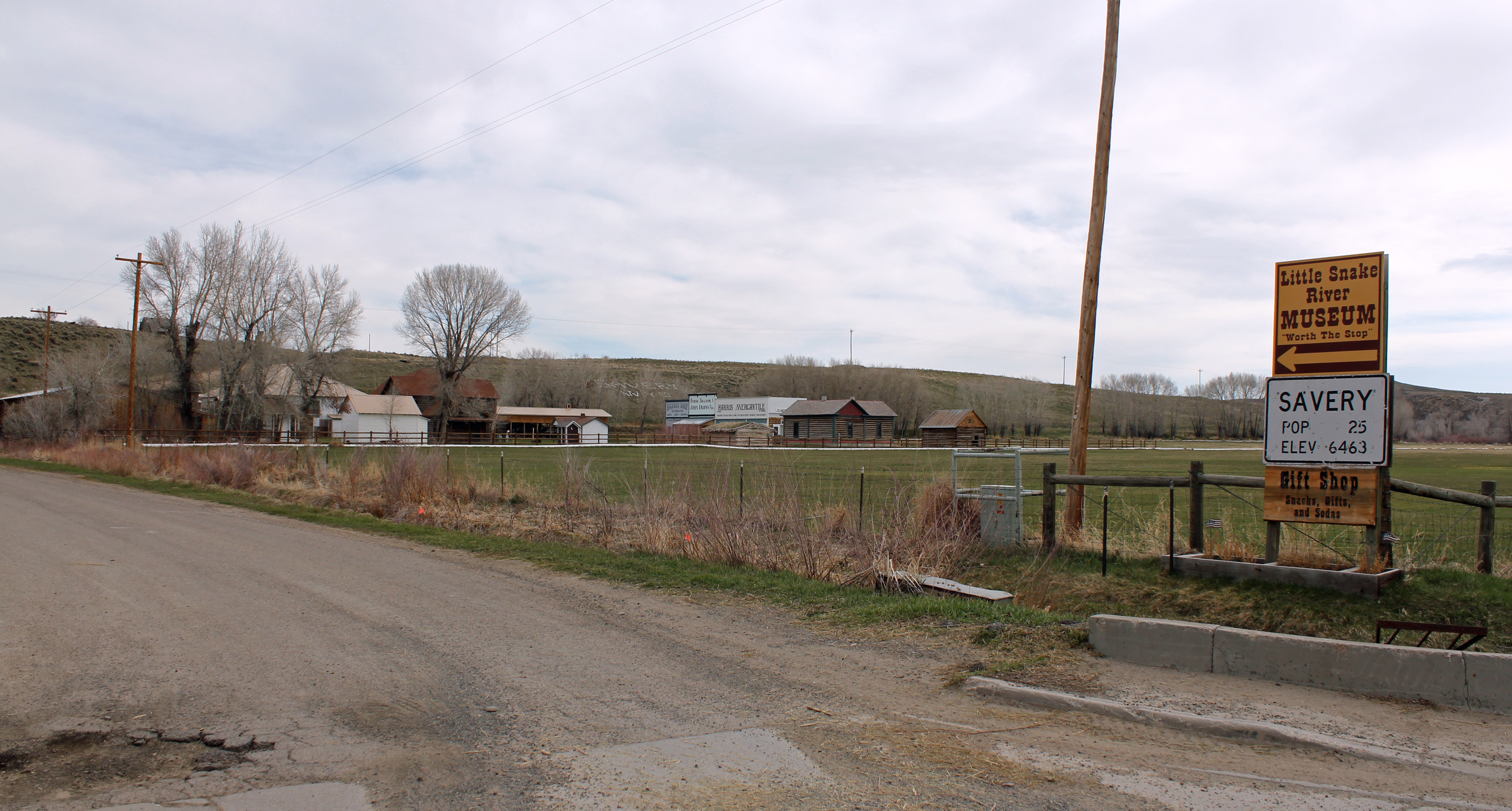
- A view of Savery and the Little Snake River Museum.

- Location within the state of Wyoming Savery, Wyoming (the United States)
- Coordinates: 41°1′30″N 107°26′59″W
- Country: United States
- State: Wyoming
- County: Carbon
- Elevation: 6,473 ft (1,973 m)

Population (2000)
  - Total: 25
- Time zone: UTC-7 (Mountain (MST))
  - Summer (DST): UTC-6 (MDT)
- ZIP codes: 82332
- GNIS feature ID: 1593956

Savery is an unincorporated community in southeastern Carbon County, Wyoming, United States, on the upper Little Snake River. It lies along WYO 70 south of the city of Rawlins, the county seat of Carbon County. Its elevation is 6,473 feet (1,973 m). It has a post office with ZIP code 82332, and is home to the Little Snake River Museum.

Public education in the community of Savery is provided by Carbon County School District #1.
