= George Ferris Mansion =

Historic house in Wyoming, United States

- U.S. National Register of Historic Places
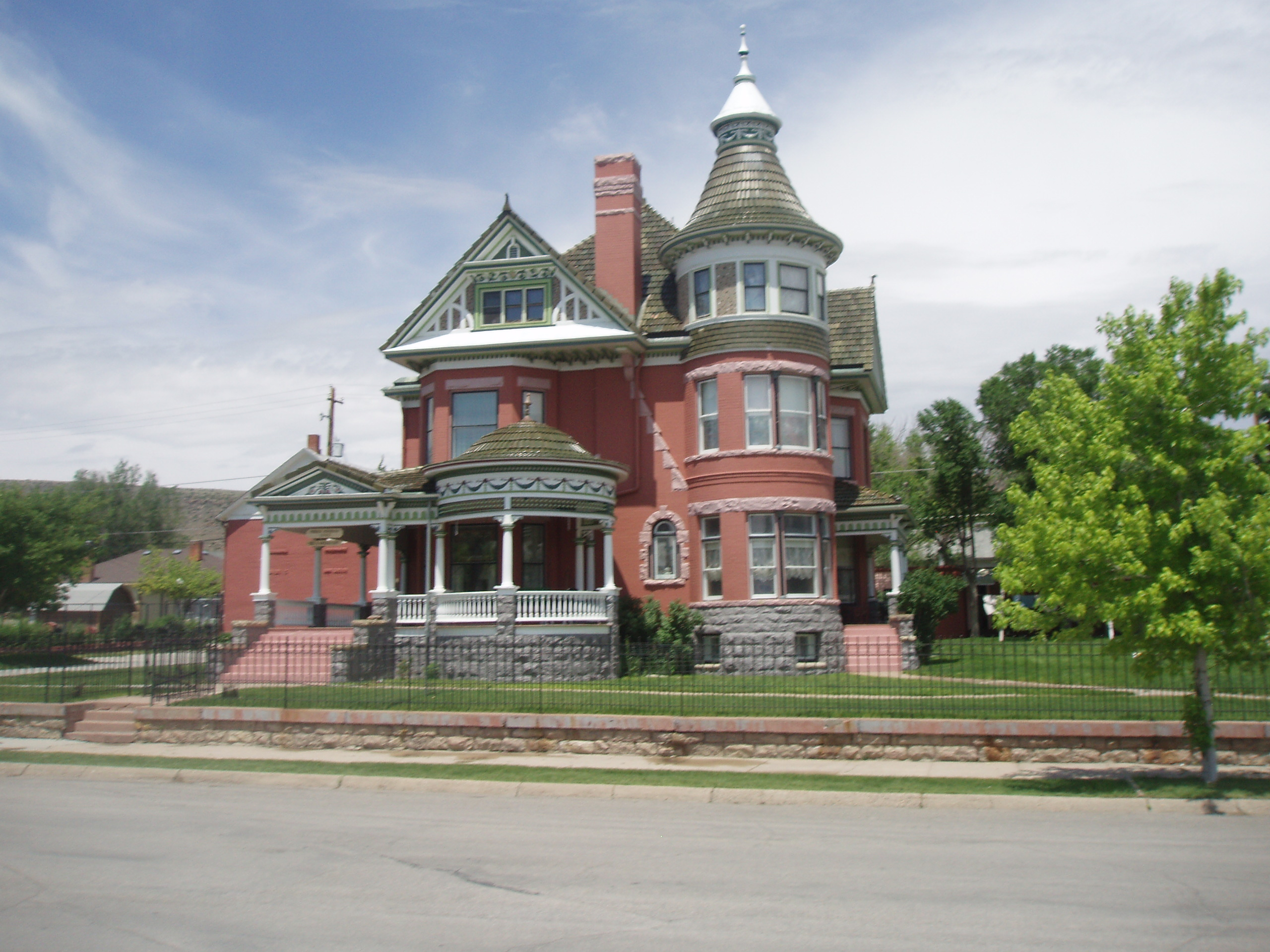

- Location within Wyoming Location within the United States
- Location: 607 W. Maple St., Rawlins, Wyoming
- Coordinates: 41°47′29″N 107°14′34″W
- Area: 0.4 acres (0.16 ha)
- Built: 1903
- Architect: Barber & Klutz
- Architectural style: Queen Anne
- NRHP reference No.: 82001831
- Added to NRHP: November 1, 1982

The George Ferris Mansion in Rawlins, Wyoming is one of the most significant Queen Anne style buildings in Wyoming. Built during 1899–1903, the house's design was published by the Knoxville, Tennessee architectural firm of Barber and Klutz in an architectural pattern book. The house was built for George and Julia Ferris.

George Ferris (d.1900) was born in Michigan. He moved to Wyoming and pursued a variety of vocations, including prospecting, ranching and game hunting, as well as election to the Wyoming Territorial Assembly and the Wyoming Constitutional Convention. Ferris' wealth came from the Rudefeha Mine (later the Ferris-Haggarty Mine) in the Grand Encampment copper mining district. Work on the house began in 1899, but George Ferris was killed in 1900 when he was thrown from a runaway carriage near his mine. The house was completed in 1903, and Julia Ferris lived there until her death at 76 in 1931.

The house is a 2 1/2-story brick house with a prominent corner turret, with six rooms on the main floor. The masonry is trimmed with local sandstone. The roof is irregular, and exterior details are accented with a variety of materials, as is appropriate in a Queen Anne building. The prominent carriage house was built at the same time as the house. Once subdivided into apartments, the house was restored as a single-family residence.

The George Ferris Mansion was placed on the National Register of Historic Places on November 1, 1982. It is now a bed-and-breakfast.
