= Saratoga, Wyoming =

Saratoga
- Town
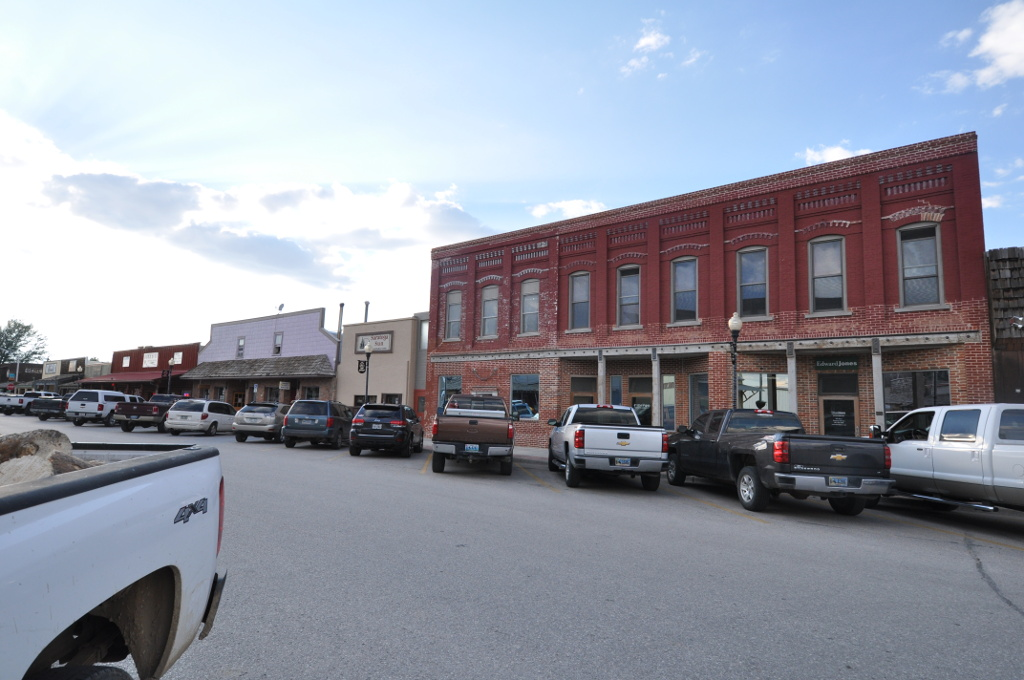
- Main Street, Saratoga

- Location of Saratoga in Carbon County, Wyoming
- Coordinates: 41°27′06″N 106°48′39″W
- Country: United States
- State: Wyoming
- County: Carbon

Area
  - Total: 3.59 sq mi (9.29 km^{2})
  - Land: 3.40 sq mi (8.80 km^{2})
  - Water: 0.19 sq mi (0.49 km^{2})
- Elevation: 6,791 ft (2,070 m)

Population (2020)
  - Total: 1,702
  - Density: 475.2/sq mi (183.49/km^{2})
- Time zone: UTC−7 (Mountain (MST))
  - Summer (DST): UTC−6 (MDT)
- ZIP code: 82331
- Area code: 307
- GNIS feature ID: 2413260
- FIPS code: 56-68685
- Website: www.townofsaratoga.org

Saratoga is a town in Carbon County, Wyoming, United States. The population was 1,702 at the 2020 census.

Saratoga is the home of the Steinley Cup microbrew festival and competition, usually held in August at Veterans Island Park, a playground and picnic facility on a small island in the North Platte River, which is designated a Blue Ribbon Stream by the Wyoming Game and Fish Department. Saratoga also has a public pool heated by a hot spring. Its two largest employers are the United States Forest Service and Carbon County School District No. 2, both public sector employers. The town's motto is "Where The Trout Leap In Main Street." The local newspaper is the Saratoga Sun.

== Geography and climate ==
According to the United States Census Bureau, the town has a total area of 3.59 square miles (9.30 km^{2}), of which 3.40 square miles (8.81 km^{2}) is land and 0.19 square miles (0.49 km^{2}) is water.

Climate data for Saratoga, Wyoming, 1991–2020 normals, extremes 1948–present
Month	Jan	Feb	Mar	Apr	May	Jun	Jul	Aug	Sep	Oct	Nov	Dec	Year
Record high °F (°C)	58 (14)	61 (16)	73 (23)	78 (26)	88 (31)	97 (36)	100 (38)	95 (35)	91 (33)	81 (27)	70 (21)	59 (15)	100 (38)
Mean maximum °F (°C)	49.2 (9.6)	51.6 (10.9)	62.3 (16.8)	71.6 (22.0)	79.3 (26.3)	87.0 (30.6)	90.7 (32.6)	88.4 (31.3)	83.9 (28.8)	73.7 (23.2)	60.6 (15.9)	51.2 (10.7)	91.3 (32.9)
Mean daily maximum °F (°C)	32.7 (0.4)	35.5 (1.9)	45.1 (7.3)	53.4 (11.9)	63.5 (17.5)	75.4 (24.1)	83.5 (28.6)	80.7 (27.1)	72.0 (22.2)	57.6 (14.2)	43.3 (6.3)	32.8 (0.4)	56.3 (13.5)
Daily mean °F (°C)	19.8 (−6.8)	22.8 (−5.1)	31.9 (−0.1)	39.2 (4.0)	48.1 (8.9)	57.8 (14.3)	64.8 (18.2)	62.3 (16.8)	53.2 (11.8)	40.8 (4.9)	29.7 (−1.3)	20.1 (−6.6)	40.9 (4.9)
Mean daily minimum °F (°C)	6.9 (−13.9)	10.0 (−12.2)	18.7 (−7.4)	24.9 (−3.9)	32.6 (0.3)	40.1 (4.5)	46.1 (7.8)	43.8 (6.6)	34.3 (1.3)	23.9 (−4.5)	16.1 (−8.8)	7.4 (−13.7)	25.4 (−3.7)
Mean minimum °F (°C)	−14.2 (−25.7)	−12.3 (−24.6)	0.9 (−17.3)	11.9 (−11.2)	19.5 (−6.9)	30.6 (−0.8)	38.8 (3.8)	35.2 (1.8)	23.4 (−4.8)	7.2 (−13.8)	−5.7 (−20.9)	−15.6 (−26.4)	−22.6 (−30.3)
Record low °F (°C)	−42 (−41)	−39 (−39)	−25 (−32)	−12 (−24)	1 (−17)	23 (−5)	30 (−1)	24 (−4)	10 (−12)	−29 (−34)	−26 (−32)	−37 (−38)	−42 (−41)
Average precipitation inches (mm)	0.58 (15)	0.83 (21)	1.06 (27)	1.51 (38)	1.67 (42)	1.31 (33)	0.94 (24)	1.17 (30)	1.25 (32)	1.47 (37)	0.82 (21)	0.78 (20)	13.39 (340)
Average snowfall inches (cm)	8.4 (21)	7.0 (18)	7.7 (20)	7.7 (20)	1.6 (4.1)	0.0 (0.0)	0.0 (0.0)	0.0 (0.0)	0.7 (1.8)	4.4 (11)	7.6 (19)	8.0 (20)	53.1 (134.9)
Average precipitation days (≥ 0.01 in)	4.8	4.9	5.3	8.2	9.1	4.9	6.1	6.7	6.0	6.2	5.7	5.2	73.1
Average snowy days (≥ 0.1 in)	4.4	4.4	3.7	3.6	1.0	0.0	0.0	0.0	0.3	1.9	4.5	4.6	28.4
Source: NOAA

== Demographics ==
Historical population
Census	Pop.	Note	%±
1910	557		—
1920	449		−19.4%
1930	567		26.3%
1940	810		42.9%
1950	926		14.3%
1960	1,133		22.4%
1970	1,181		4.2%
1980	2,410		104.1%
1990	1,969		−18.3%
2000	1,726		−12.3%
2010	1,690		−2.1%
2020	1,702		0.7%
2025 (est.)	1,770	▲	4.0%
U.S. Decennial Census

=== 2020 census ===
As of the census of 2020, there were 1,697 people, 804 households, and 476 families residing in the town. The population density was 497.1 inhabitants per square mile (191.9/km^{2}). There were 982 housing units at an average density of 287.9 units per square mile (111.2 units/km^{2}). The racial makeup of the town was 93.7% White, 0.9% Native American, 0.6% Asian, 3.5% from other races, and 1.9% from two or more races. Hispanic or Latino of any race were 6.1% of the population.

There were 804 households, of which 23.9% had children under the age of 18 living with them, 49.0% were married couples living together, 7.7% had a female householder with no husband present, 5.4% had a male householder with no wife present, and 40.4% were non-families. 34.9% of all households were made up of individuals, and 13% had someone living alone who was 65 years of age or older. The average household size was 2.07 and the average family size was 2.62.

The median age in the town was 48.9 years. 17.6% of residents were under the age of 18; 4.8% were between the ages of 18 and 24; 21.3% were from 25 to 44; 34.6% were from 45 to 64; and 21.6% were 65 years of age or older. The gender makeup of the town was 51.3% male and 48.7% female.

=== 2010 census ===
As of the census of 2010, there were 1,690 people, 802 households, and 474 families residing in the town. The population density was 497.1 inhabitants per square mile (191.9/km^{2}). There were 979 housing units at an average density of 287.9 units per square mile (111.2 units/km^{2}). The racial makeup of the town was 94.4% White, 0.9% Native American, 0.6% Asian, 2.2% from other races, and 1.9% from two or more races. Hispanic or Latino of any race were 5.1% of the population.

There were 802 households, of which 21.8% had children under the age of 18 living with them, 48.0% were married couples living together, 6.7% had a female householder with no husband present, 4.4% had a male householder with no wife present, and 40.9% were non-families. 34.2% of all households were made up of individuals, and 13% had someone living alone who was 65 years of age or older. The average household size was 2.07 and the average family size was 2.62.

The median age in the town was 48.9 years. 17.6% of residents were under the age of 18; 4.8% were between the ages of 18 and 24; 21.3% were from 25 to 44; 34.6% were from 45 to 64; and 21.6% were 65 years of age or older. The gender makeup of the town was 51.3% male and 48.7% female.

=== 2000 census ===
As of the census of 2000, there were 1,726 people, 757 households, and 482 families residing in the town. The population density was 505.7 people per square mile (195.3 people/km^{2}). There were 939 housing units at an average density of 275.1 units per square mile (106.2 units/km^{2}). The racial makeup of the town was 95.42% White, 0.12% African American, 0.81% Native American, 0.70% Asian, 0.06% Pacific Islander, 1.56% from other races, and 1.33% from two or more races. Hispanic or Latino of any race were 4.11% of the population.

There were 757 households, out of which 27.9% had children under the age of 18 living with them, 52.4% were married couples living together, 7.3% had a female householder with no husband present, and 36.3% were non-families. 31.8% of all households were made up of individuals, and 12.8% had someone living alone who was 65 years of age or older. The average household size was 2.23 and the average family size was 2.79.

In the town, the age distribution of the population shows 23.1% under the age of 18, 5.2% from 18 to 24, 25.3% from 25 to 44, 28.9% from 45 to 64, and 17.6% who were 65 years of age or older. The median age was 43 years. For every 100 females, there were 100.9 males. For every 100 females age 18 and over, there were 101.2 males.

The median income for a household in the town was $37,135, and the median income for a family was $45,362. Males had a median income of $32,446 versus $20,489 for females. The per capita income for the town was $23,376. About 8.4% of families and 10.0% of the population were below the poverty line, including 10.0% of those under age 18 and 12.2% of those age 65 or over.

== Government ==
Saratoga government runs on a mayor/council forum. Saratoga has a town council consisting of 4 council members and a mayor. As of January 3, 2023, the mayor is Chuck Davis.

== Notable people ==
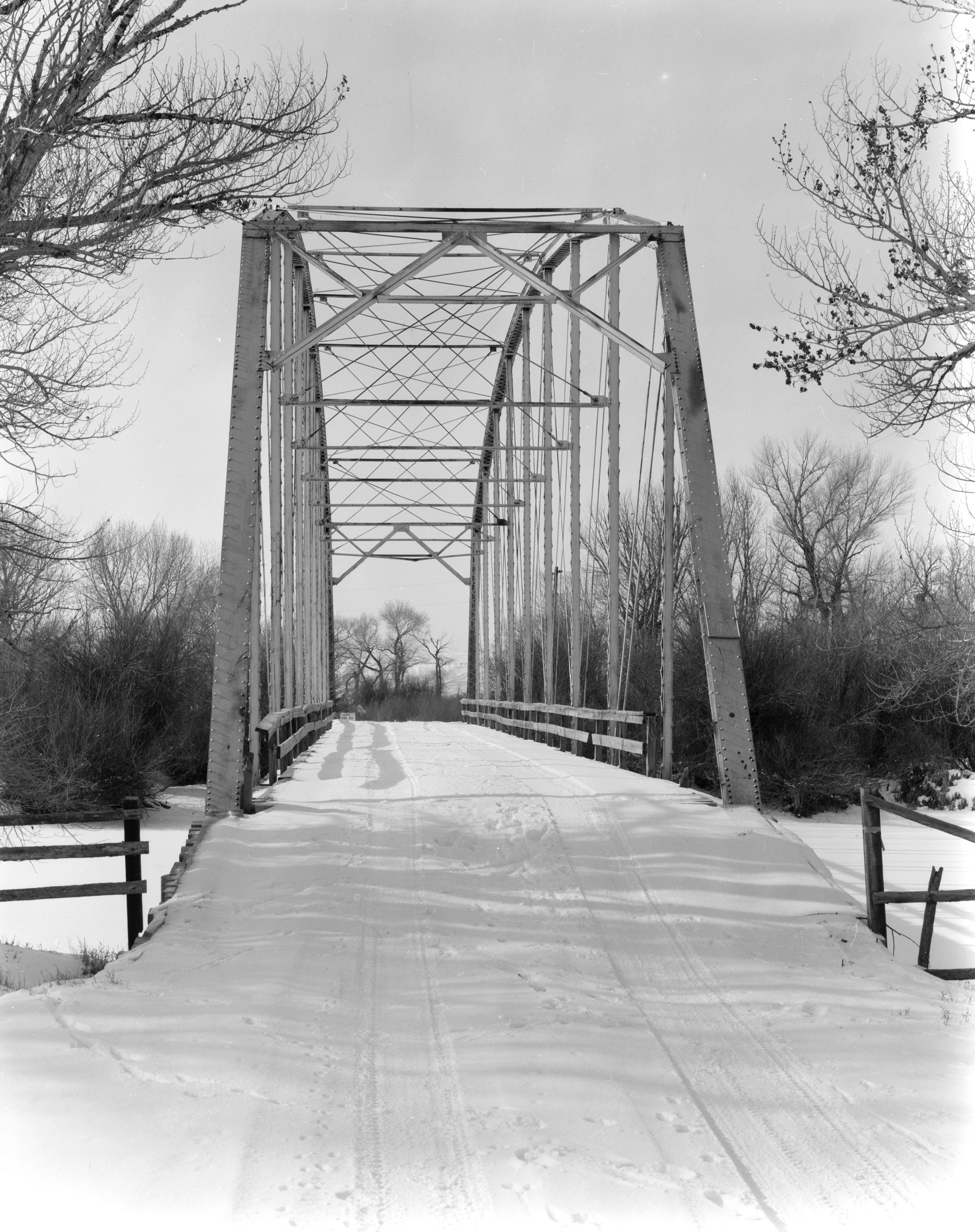
Pick Bridge over the North Platte River near Saratoga, listed on the National Register of Historic Places

- C. C. Beall (1892–1970), commercial illustrator, portrait artist
- C. J. Box (born 1958), novelist
- Rodney Morris (born 1970) professional pool player
- Howard Thomas Orville (1901–1960), naval officer, meteorologist
- Garrett Price (1896–1979) comic strip author during the 1930s
- Annie Proulx (born 1935), novelist

== Education ==
Public education in Saratoga is provided by Carbon County School District Number 2.

Saratoga has two schools, Saratoga High School and Saratoga Elementary School. The middle school was closed and demolished in 2005. After its destruction, the classes that had been in that building were separated, part of them attending the elementary school and the remainder the high school. Saratoga has redeveloped an old school building into the multi-use Platte Valley Community Center, which hosts concerts, lectures, theatrical performance, and community events.

Saratoga has a public library, a branch of the Carbon County Library System.
