= Baggs, Wyoming =

- Town
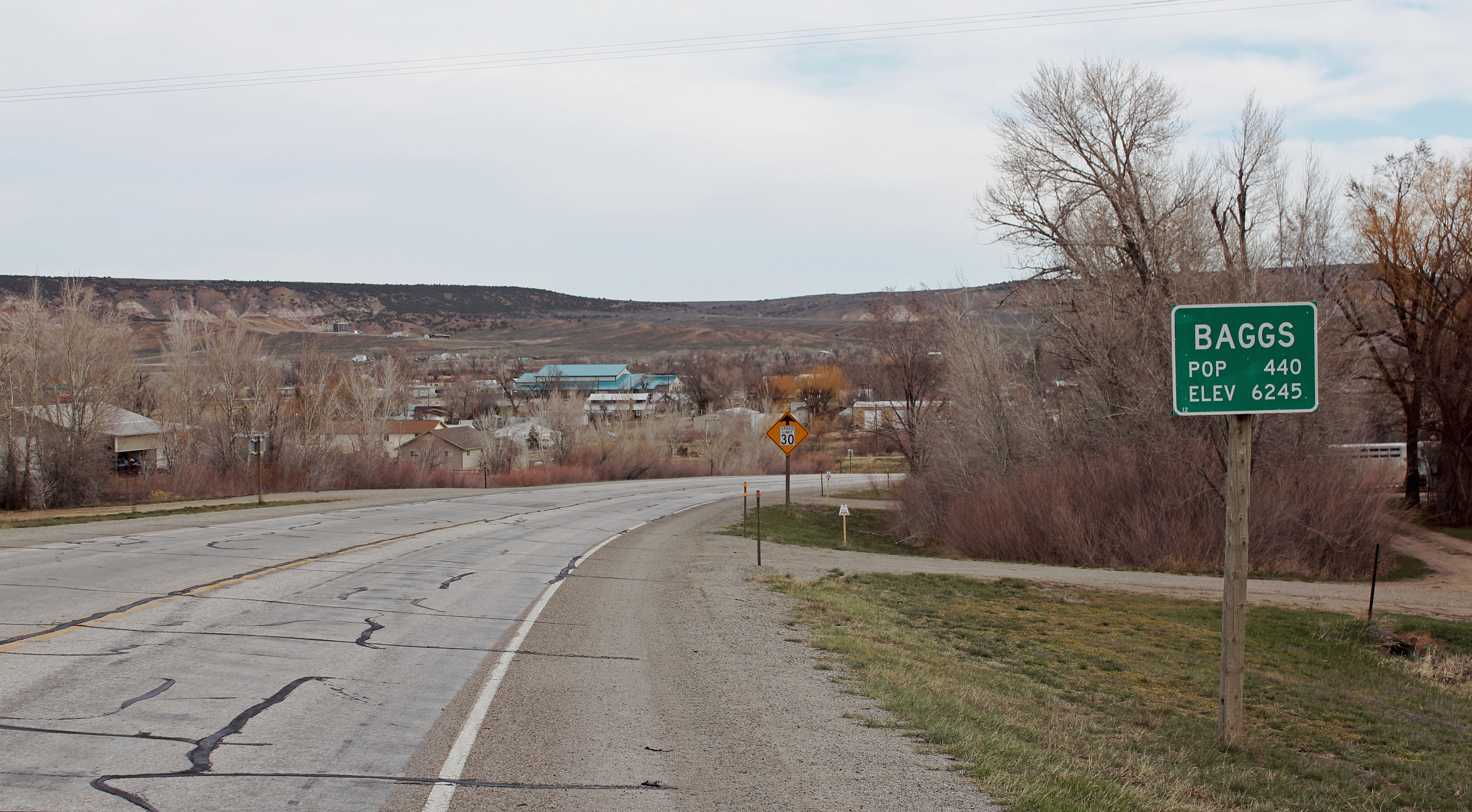
- Entering Baggs from the south on Wyoming State Highway 789.

- Location of Baggs in Carbon County, Wyoming.
- Coordinates: 41°02′04″N 107°39′27″W
- Country: United States
- State: Wyoming
- County: Carbon

Government
  - Mayor: Matt Howell

Area
  - Total: 0.51 sq mi (1.32 km^{2})
  - Land: 0.51 sq mi (1.31 km^{2})
  - Water: 0.0039 sq mi (0.01 km^{2})
- Elevation: 6,247 ft (1,904 m)

Population (2020)
  - Total: 411
  - Density: 825.1/sq mi (318.59/km^{2})
- Time zone: UTC-7 (Mountain (MST))
  - Summer (DST): UTC-6 (MDT)
- ZIP code: 82321
- Area code: 307
- GNIS feature ID: 2411659
- FIPS code: 56-04740
- Website: www.townofbaggs.com

Baggs is a town in Carbon County, Wyoming, United States. The population was 411 at the 2020 census.

Baggs is home to the Outlaw Stop, a branch of the Little Snake River Museum, which is headquartered in Savery.

The community was incorporated in 1910.

== Geography ==
The town is approximately 3 miles (4.8 km) north of the Colorado state line, and 77 miles (124 km) southwest of Rawlins, the county seat.

According to the United States Census Bureau, the town has a total area of 0.51 square miles (1.32 km^{2}), all land.

== Demographics ==
Historical population
Census	Pop.	Note	%±
1920	200		—
1930	192		−4.0%
1940	221		15.1%
1950	206		−6.8%
1960	199		−3.4%
1970	146		−26.6%
1980	433		196.6%
1990	272		−37.2%
2000	348		27.9%
2010	440		26.4%
2020	411		−6.6%
2025 (est.)	405	▼	−1.5%
U.S. Decennial Census

=== 2010 census ===
As of the 2010 Census, there were 440 people, 183 households, and 114 families living in the town. The population density was 862.7 inhabitants per square mile (333.1/km^{2}). There were 223 housing units at an average density of 437.3 per square mile (168.8/km^{2}). The ethnic makeup of the town was 94.1% White, 0.5% Native American, 0.2% Asian, 4.8% from other races, and 0.5% from two or more ethnic groups. Hispanic or Latino of any ethnic groups were 11.4% of the population.

There were 183 households, of which 34.4% had children under the age of 18 living with them, 49.7% were married couples living together, 7.7% had a female householder with no husband present, 4.9% had a male householder with no wife present, and 37.7% were non-families. 30.1% of all households were made up of individuals, and 7.7% had someone living alone who was 65 years of age or older. The average household size was 2.40 and the average family size was 3.01.

The median age in the town was 34.3 years. 27% of residents were under the age of 18; 8.5% were between the ages of 18 and 24; 25.9% were from 25 to 44; 28.2% were from 45 to 64; and 10.5% were 65 years of age or older. The gender makeup of the town was 52.7% male and 47.3% female.

=== 2000 census ===
As of the census of 2000, there were 348 people, 147 households, and 88 families living in the town. The population density was 705.8 people per square mile (274.2/km^{2}). There were 197 housing units at an average density of 399.6 per square mile (155.2/km^{2}). The racial makeup of the town was 94.83% White, 2.59% Native American, 0.29% Asian, 1.72% from other races, and 0.57% from two or more races. Hispanic or Latino of any race were 5.17% of the population.

There were 147 households, out of which 32.0% had children under the age of 18 living with them, 44.9% were married couples living together, 9.5% had a female householder with no husband present, and 40.1% were non-families. 29.3% of all households were made up of individuals, and 10.9% had someone living alone who was 65 years of age or older. The average household size was 2.37 and the average family size was 2.97.

In the town, the population was spread out, with 26.1% under the age of 18, 6.3% from 18 to 24, 31.0% from 25 to 44, 25.6% from 45 to 64, and 10.9% who were 65 years of age or older. The median age was 39 years. For every 100 females, there were 112.2 males. For every 100 females age 18 and over, there were 100.8 males.

The median income for a household in the town was $29,688, and the median income for a family was $38,250. Males had a median income of $32,031 versus $21,250 for females. The per capita income for the town was $20,812. About 7.9% of families and 14.9% of the population were below the poverty line, including 8.4% of those under age 18 and 10.8% of those age 65 or over.

== Geography ==
=== Climate ===
This climatic region is typified by large seasonal temperature differences, with warm to hot (and often humid) summers and cold (sometimes severely cold) winters. According to the Köppen climate classification system, Baggs has a humid continental climate, abbreviated Dfb on climate maps.

Climate data for Baggs, Wyoming (1991–2020 normals, extremes 1979–present)
Month	Jan	Feb	Mar	Apr	May	Jun	Jul	Aug	Sep	Oct	Nov	Dec	Year
Record high °F (°C)	55 (13)	61 (16)	80 (27)	83 (28)	93 (34)	104 (40)	99 (37)	100 (38)	92 (33)	82 (28)	77 (25)	59 (15)	104 (40)
Mean maximum °F (°C)	44.3 (6.8)	49.0 (9.4)	63.6 (17.6)	73.3 (22.9)	81.7 (27.6)	89.6 (32.0)	93.5 (34.2)	91.3 (32.9)	85.6 (29.8)	75.1 (23.9)	60.2 (15.7)	47.4 (8.6)	93.3 (34.1)
Mean daily maximum °F (°C)	32.2 (0.1)	36.5 (2.5)	48.3 (9.1)	57.8 (14.3)	67.9 (19.9)	79.4 (26.3)	86.7 (30.4)	83.9 (28.8)	74.5 (23.6)	59.9 (15.5)	44.6 (7.0)	33.2 (0.7)	58.7 (14.8)
Daily mean °F (°C)	19.6 (−6.9)	24.2 (−4.3)	35.3 (1.8)	43.4 (6.3)	52.1 (11.2)	61.2 (16.2)	68.0 (20.0)	65.8 (18.8)	57.1 (13.9)	44.6 (7.0)	31.7 (−0.2)	21.2 (−6.0)	43.7 (6.5)
Mean daily minimum °F (°C)	7.0 (−13.9)	12.0 (−11.1)	22.4 (−5.3)	28.9 (−1.7)	36.2 (2.3)	43.1 (6.2)	49.2 (9.6)	47.7 (8.7)	39.7 (4.3)	29.3 (−1.5)	18.8 (−7.3)	9.2 (−12.7)	28.6 (−1.9)
Mean minimum °F (°C)	−16.6 (−27.0)	−11.5 (−24.2)	5.0 (−15.0)	15.9 (−8.9)	24.1 (−4.4)	32.0 (0.0)	40.7 (4.8)	37.2 (2.9)	26.3 (−3.2)	12.7 (−10.7)	−2.3 (−19.1)	−13.8 (−25.4)	−21.4 (−29.7)
Record low °F (°C)	−50 (−46)	−47 (−44)	−22 (−30)	−2 (−19)	9 (−13)	20 (−7)	31 (−1)	28 (−2)	1 (−17)	−7 (−22)	−26 (−32)	−39 (−39)	−50 (−46)
Average precipitation inches (mm)	0.72 (18)	0.76 (19)	0.71 (18)	1.11 (28)	1.77 (45)	0.77 (20)	0.87 (22)	0.90 (23)	1.09 (28)	1.07 (27)	0.70 (18)	0.70 (18)	11.17 (284)
Average snowfall inches (cm)	6.9 (18)	6.5 (17)	2.9 (7.4)	0.9 (2.3)	0.5 (1.3)	0.0 (0.0)	0.0 (0.0)	0.0 (0.0)	0.2 (0.51)	1.6 (4.1)	5.3 (13)	5.7 (14)	30.5 (77)
Average precipitation days (≥ 0.01 in)	3.7	2.6	2.2	3.9	4.3	2.8	3.1	3.6	3.5	3.4	2.4	3.1	38.6
Average snowy days (≥ 0.1 in)	3.4	2.3	1.2	0.6	0.3	0.0	0.0	0.0	0.0	0.6	1.4	3.1	12.9
Source: NOAA

== Government ==
The town has a mayor and town council. There are three council members.

== Arts and culture ==
Baggs has a public library, a branch of the Carbon County Library System.

== Education ==
Public education is provided by Carbon County School District Number 1. Little Snake River Valley School, a K-12 campus, serves the town.

== See also ==
- List of municipalities in Wyoming
