= Carbon County, Wyoming =

County in Wyoming, United States

- County
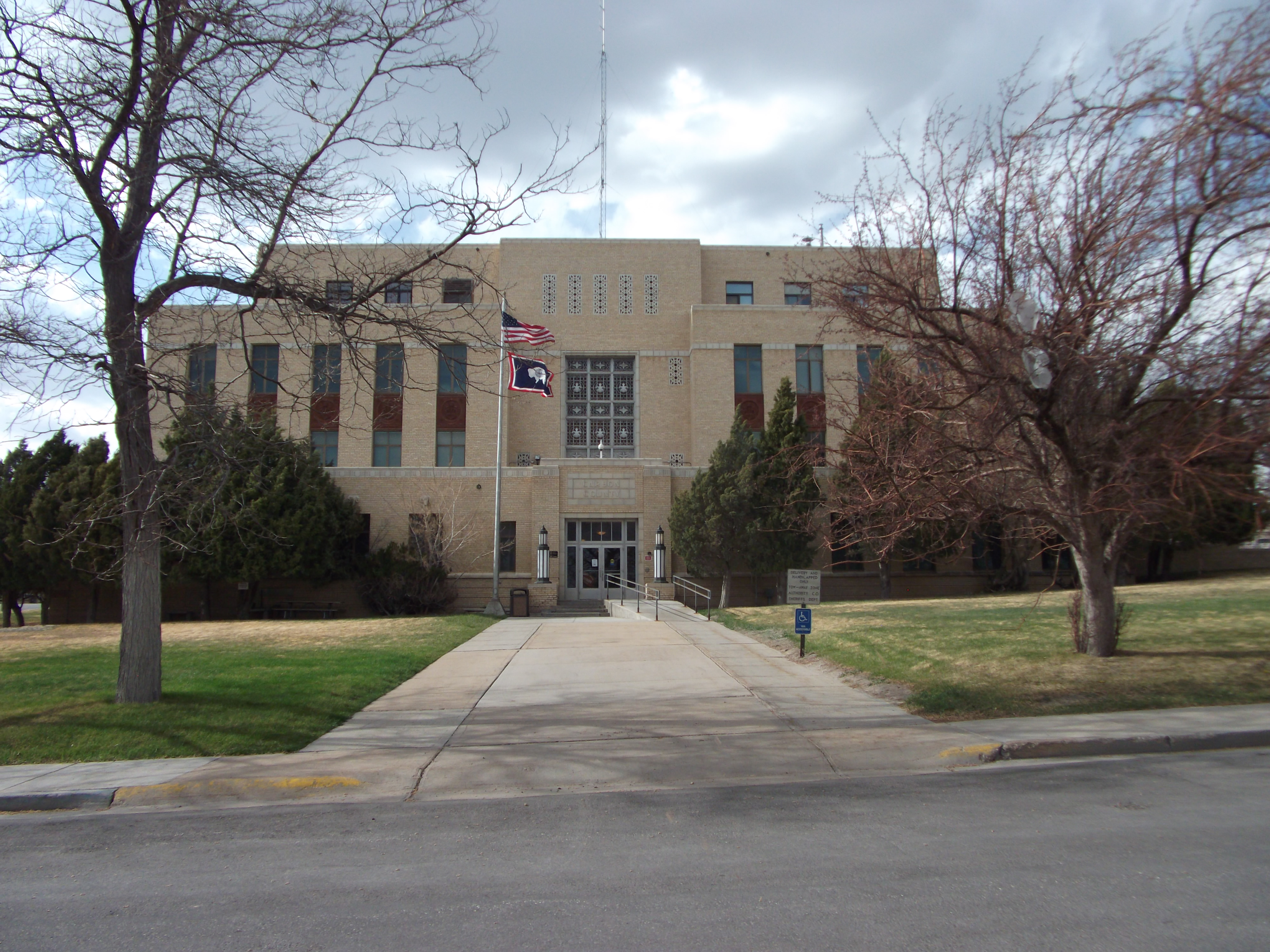
- Carbon County Courthouse in Rawlins

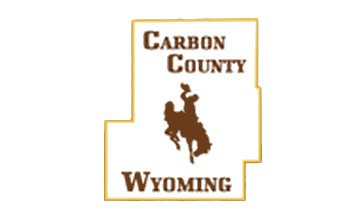
- Flag

- Location within the U.S. state of Wyoming
- Coordinates: 41°41′N 106°56′W
- Country: United States
- State: Wyoming
- Founded: December 16, 1868
- Named for: Coal deposits
- Seat: Rawlins
- Largest city: Rawlins

Area
  - Total: 7,964 sq mi (20,630 km^{2})
  - Land: 7,898 sq mi (20,460 km^{2})
  - Water: 66 sq mi (170 km^{2}) 0.8%

Population (2020)
  - Total: 14,537
  - Estimate (2025): 14,013 ▼
  - Density: 1.841/sq mi (0.7107/km^{2})
- Time zone: UTC−7 (Mountain)
  - Summer (DST): UTC−6 (MDT)
- Congressional district: At-large
- Website: www.carboncountywy.gov

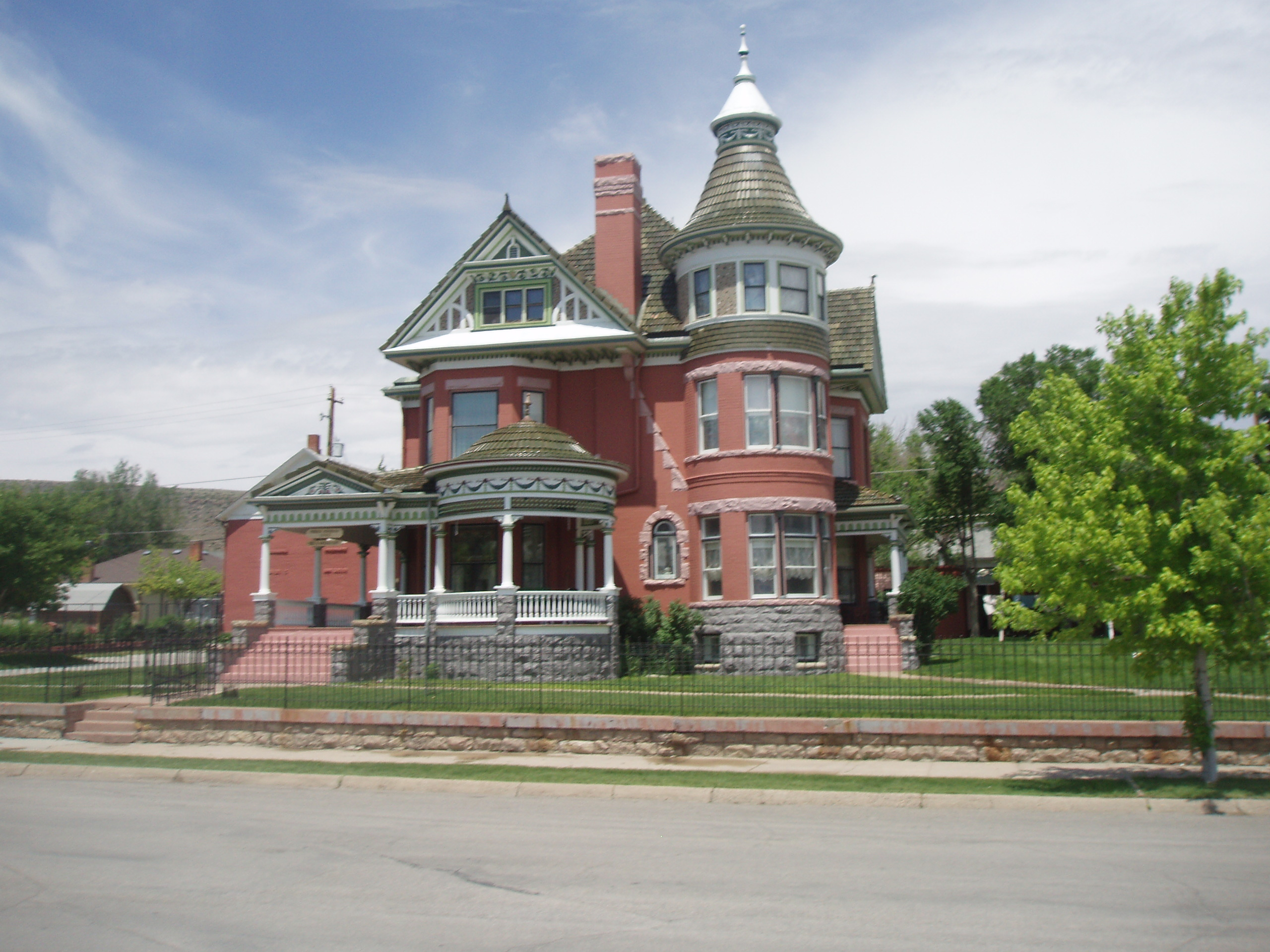
George Ferris Mansion, Rawlins

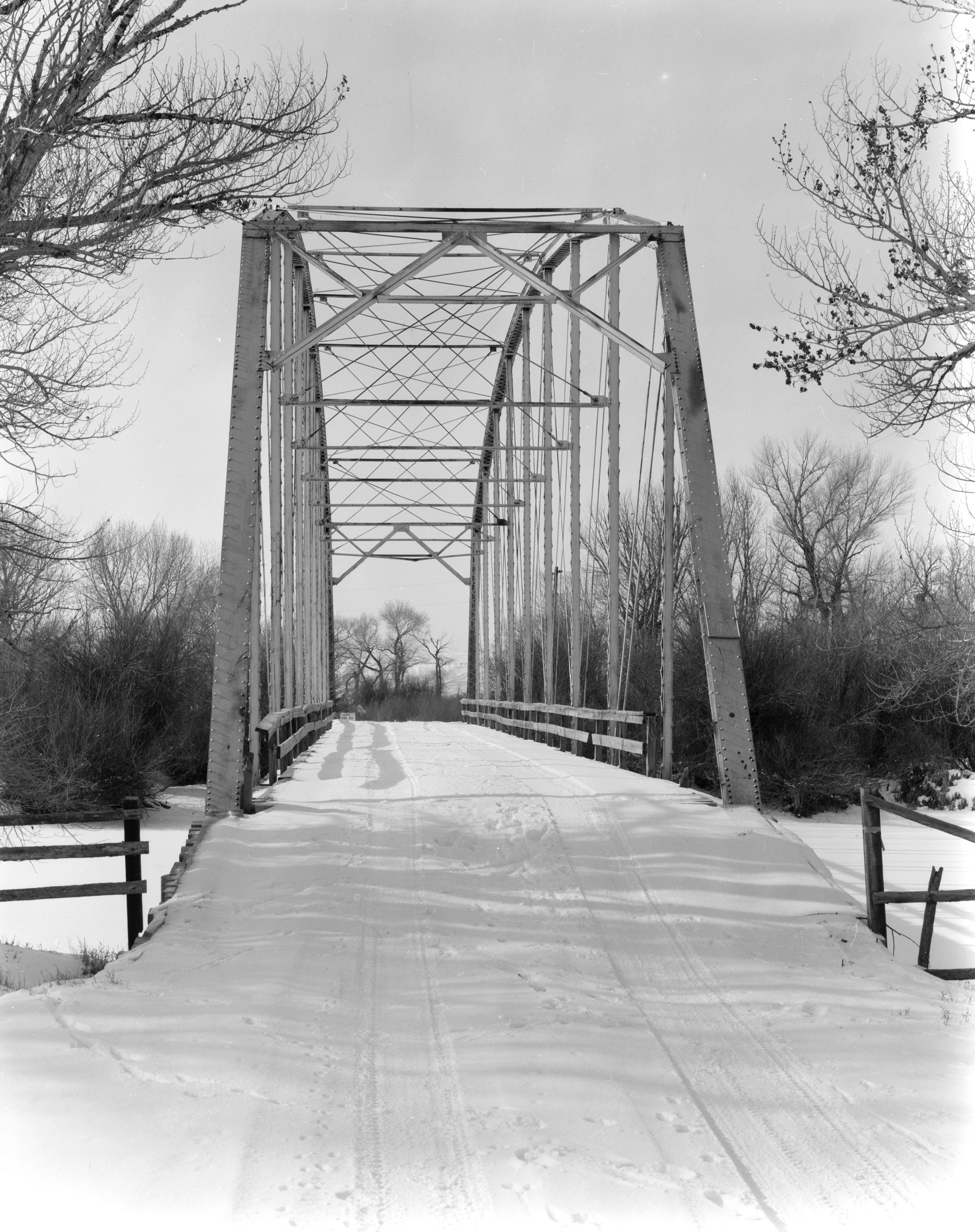
Pick Bridge over the North Platte River, near Saratoga. Listed on the National Register of Historic Places.

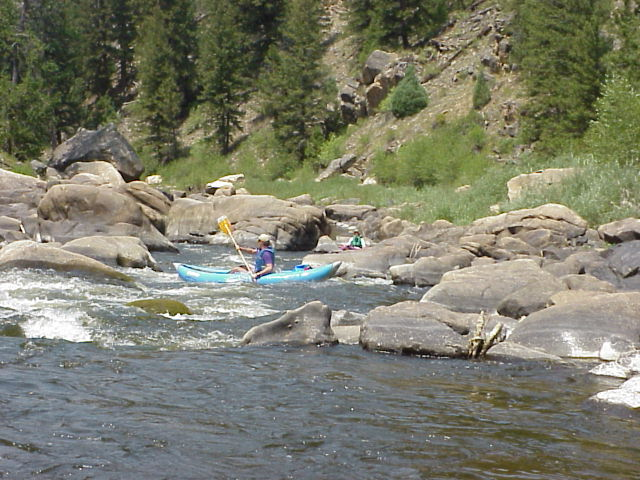
Canoers on the North Platte River, Northgate Canyon

Carbon County is a county in the U.S. state of Wyoming. As of the 2020 United States census, the population was 14,537. Its county seat is Rawlins. Its south border abuts the north line of Colorado.

== History ==
Carbon County was organized in 1868, one of the five original counties in Dakota Territory.

Originally about 3,400 square miles (8,800 km^{2}) near the center of Wyoming, Carbon County was once part of the Spanish Empire, then part of the Republic of Texas (1835–1845) and part of the State of Texas until 1852 when the northernmost part of that state's claims were ceded to the US government. This area is defined by the 42nd parallel on the north, and straight lines south from there to the headwaters of the Arkansas river on the east and the headwaters of the Rio Grande on the west. The documents defining that area include the Adams-Onís Treaty of 1819, the 1824 Constitution of Mexico, and the 1845 "Joint Resolution for the Admission of the State of Texas into the Union".

Carbon County was organized December 16, 1868, from Laramie County in Dakota Territory, which at the time had jurisdiction over part of modern-day Wyoming. It became a county in Wyoming Territory when that territory's government was formally organized on May 19, 1869.

In 1868, the Union Pacific Railroad opened the first coal mine in Carbon County, and the county was named for its extensive coal deposits. In 1875, Carbon County lost territory when Johnson County was created by the legislature of the Wyoming Territory. Natrona County was created with land ceded by Carbon County in 1888. The boundaries of the county were final at that time except for minor adjustments in 1911.

From 1978 to 1982, Carbon County was represented in the Wyoming House of Representatives by Democrat Thomas E. Trowbridge (1930–2009) of Saratoga, a Nebraska native. From 1982 to 1986, Trowbridge was a member of the Wyoming State Senate. He was later appointed by Governor Mike Sullivan to the Wyoming State Board of Equalization. Trowbridge's father, Elton Trowbridge, held the state House seat from Carbon County from 1961 until his death in office in 1974.

George R. Salisbury Jr., a rancher from Savery, represented Carbon County in the Wyoming House from 1975 to 1986. He was succeeded in office by his son-in-law and fellow Democrat, Patrick F. O'Toole, also a Savery rancher.

== Geography ==
According to the US Census Bureau, the county has a total area of 7,964 square miles (20,630 km^{2}), of which 7,898 square miles (20,460 km^{2}) is land and 66 square miles (170 km^{2}) (2.0%) is water. It is the third-largest county in Wyoming by area.

The Continental Divide runs through the county.

Carbon County is equidistant from the North American capital cities of Ottawa, Washington, D.C., and Mexico City, being 1,590 miles (2,560 km) from each of them. It is therefore one of two circumcenters of these cities. The other circumcenter is the antipode of Carbon County, a spot in the ocean off the southwest coast of Australia.

=== Major highways ===
- Interstate 80
- U.S. Highway 30
- U.S. Highway 287

=== Adjacent counties ===
- Sweetwater County - west
- Fremont County - northwest
- Natrona County - north
- Converse County - northeast
- Albany County - east
- Jackson County, Colorado - southeast
- Routt County, Colorado - south
- Moffat County, Colorado - southwest

=== National protected areas and State historical sites ===
- Fort Fred Steele State Historic Site
- Medicine Bow National Forest (part)
- Pathfinder National Wildlife Refuge (part)

== Demographics ==
Historical population
Census	Pop.	Note	%±
1870	1,368		—
1880	3,438		151.3%
1890	6,857		99.4%
1900	9,589		39.8%
1910	11,282		17.7%
1920	9,525		−15.6%
1930	11,391		19.6%
1940	12,644		11.0%
1950	15,742		24.5%
1960	14,937		−5.1%
1970	13,354		−10.6%
1980	21,896		64.0%
1990	16,659		−23.9%
2000	15,639		−6.1%
2010	15,885		1.6%
2020	14,537		−8.5%
2025 (est.)	14,013	▼	−3.6%
US Decennial Census; 1870–2000 2010–2020

=== 2020 census ===
As of the 2020 census, the county had a population of 14,537. Of the residents, 22.8% were under the age of 18 and 18.1% were 65 years of age or older; the median age was 40.3 years. For every 100 females there were 115.7 males, and for every 100 females age 18 and over there were 118.2 males.

Carbon County, Wyoming – Racial and ethnic composition Note: the US Census treats Hispanic/Latino as an ethnic category. This table excludes Latinos from the racial categories and assigns them to a separate category. Hispanics/Latinos may be of any race.
Race / Ethnicity (NH = Non-Hispanic)	Pop 2000	Pop 2010	Pop 2020	% 2000	% 2010	% 2020
White alone (NH)	12,892	12,683	11,006	82.43%	79.84%	75.71%
Black or African American alone (NH)	103	109	130	0.66%	0.69%	0.89%
Native American or Alaska Native alone (NH)	178	121	155	1.14%	0.76%	1.07%
Asian alone (NH)	103	103	89	0.66%	0.65%	0.61%
Pacific Islander alone (NH)	8	13	15	0.05%	0.08%	0.10%
Other race alone (NH)	20	17	60	0.13%	0.11%	0.41%
Mixed race or Multiracial (NH)	172	171	482	1.10%	1.08%	3.32%
Hispanic or Latino (any race)	2,163	2,668	2,600	13.83%	16.80%	17.89%
Total	15,639	15,885	14,537	100.00%	100.00%	100.00%

The racial makeup of the county was 82.3% White, 1.0% Black or African American, 1.3% American Indian and Alaska Native, 0.6% Asian, 6.1% from some other race, and 8.6% from two or more races. Hispanic or Latino residents of any race comprised 17.9% of the population.

There were 5,921 households in the county, of which 28.5% had children under the age of 18 living with them and 20.5% had a female householder with no spouse or partner present. About 30.7% of all households were made up of individuals and 12.8% had someone living alone who was 65 years of age or older.

There were 8,157 housing units, of which 27.4% were vacant. Among occupied housing units, 72.4% were owner-occupied and 27.6% were renter-occupied. The homeowner vacancy rate was 3.6% and the rental vacancy rate was 26.2%.

=== 2010 census ===
As of the 2010 United States census, there were 15,885 people, 6,388 households, and 4,109 families in the county. The population density was 2.0 people per square mile (0.77 people/km^{2}). There were 8,576 housing units at an average density of 1.1 units per square mile (0.42 units/km^{2}). The racial makeup of the county was 88.8% white, 1.0% American Indian, 0.7% black or African American, 0.7% Asian, 0.1% Pacific islander, 6.5% from other races, and 2.2% from two or more races. Those of Hispanic or Latino origin made up 16.8% of the population. In terms of ancestry, 26.0% were German, 15.8% were English, 14.4% were Irish, 5.6% were Scottish, and 4.8% were American.

Of the 6,388 households, 30.8% had children under the age of 18 living with them, 51.5% were married couples living together, 7.8% had a female householder with no husband present, 35.7% were non-families, and 29.6% of all households were made up of individuals. The average household size was 2.36 and the average family size was 2.91. The median age was 38.9 years.

The median income for a household in the county was $56,565 and the median income for a family was $65,171. Males had a median income of $51,201 versus $32,603 for females. The per capita income for the county was $26,122. About 5.6% of families and 8.2% of the population were below the poverty line, including 9.6% of those under age 18 and 9.6% of those age 65 or over.

=== 2000 census ===
As of the 2000 United States census, there were 15,639 people, 6,129 households, and 4,130 families in the county. The population density was 2 people per square mile (0.77 people/km^{2}). There were 8,307 housing units at an average density of 1 units per square mile (0.39 units/km^{2}). The racial makeup of the county was 90.11% White, 0.67% African-American or Black, 1.27% Indigenous American, 0.67% Asian, 0.06% Pacific Islander, 5.17% from other races, and 2.05% from two or more races. 13.83% of the population were Hispanic or Latino of any race. 20.1% were of German, 11.8% English, 10.0% Irish and 8.9% American ancestry.

There were 6,129 households, out of which 31.20% had children under the age of 18 living with them, 55.10% were married couples living together, 8.30% had a female householder with no husband present, and 32.60% were non-families. Of 6,129 households, 364 were unmarried partner households: 318 heterosexual, 41 same-sex male, and 5 same-sex female.

27.50% of all households were made up of individuals, and 9.60% had someone living alone who was 65 years of age or older. The average household size was 2.39 and the average family size was 2.91.

The county population contained 24.10% under the age of 18, 8.60% from 18 to 24, 28.40% from 25 to 44, 26.70% from 45 to 64, and 12.30% who were 65 years of age or older. The median age was 39 years. For every 100 females there were 115.30 males. For every 100 females age 18 and over, there were 118.10 males.

The median income for a household in the county was $36,060, and the median income for a family was $41,991. Males had a median income of $31,603 versus $21,451 for females. The per capita income for the county was $18,375. About 9.80% of families and 12.90% of the population were below the poverty line, including 16.60% of those under age 18 and 14.80% of those age 65 or over.

== Government and infrastructure ==
During the 20th century, owing to its considerable unionized mining population, Carbon County tended to be much more Democratic than the rest of generally Republican Wyoming. It was one of three Wyoming counties to vote for John F. Kennedy in 1960 and one of two to vote for Hubert Humphrey in 1968, while Dwight D. Eisenhower only won the county narrowly in his two landslide Presidential wins. In recent decades, the county has trended much more towards the Republican Party. The last Democrat to carry the county was Bill Clinton in 1992.

United States presidential election results for Carbon County, Wyoming
Year	Republican		Democratic		Third party(ies)	
Year	No.	%	No.	%	No.	%
1892	978	52.27%	0	0.00%	893	47.73%
1896	1,229	53.02%	1,080	46.59%	9	0.39%
1900	1,757	60.40%	1,152	39.60%	0	0.00%
1904	2,234	68.34%	956	29.24%	79	2.42%
1908	1,651	51.56%	1,430	44.66%	121	3.78%
1912	1,106	39.15%	957	33.88%	762	26.97%
1916	1,217	39.99%	1,661	54.58%	165	5.42%
1920	1,871	60.65%	1,039	33.68%	175	5.67%
1924	2,398	54.56%	733	16.68%	1,264	28.76%
1928	3,019	64.85%	1,609	34.56%	27	0.58%
1932	2,088	41.16%	2,836	55.90%	149	2.94%
1936	2,041	37.99%	3,257	60.62%	75	1.40%
1940	2,882	45.60%	3,429	54.26%	9	0.14%
1944	2,698	47.49%	2,983	52.51%	0	0.00%
1948	2,319	39.89%	3,439	59.16%	55	0.95%
1952	3,403	51.09%	3,242	48.67%	16	0.24%
1956	3,336	50.90%	3,218	49.10%	0	0.00%
1960	3,147	45.12%	3,828	54.88%	0	0.00%
1964	2,160	33.32%	4,322	66.68%	0	0.00%
1968	2,532	44.77%	2,725	48.18%	399	7.05%
1972	4,037	63.69%	2,292	36.16%	10	0.16%
1976	3,556	54.01%	3,010	45.72%	18	0.27%
1980	4,337	59.55%	2,272	31.20%	674	9.25%
1984	4,557	65.55%	2,295	33.01%	100	1.44%
1988	3,336	55.70%	2,555	42.66%	98	1.64%
1992	2,320	34.74%	2,737	40.99%	1,621	24.27%
1996	2,930	44.96%	2,690	41.28%	897	13.76%
2000	4,498	64.55%	2,206	31.66%	264	3.79%
2004	4,758	67.23%	2,158	30.49%	161	2.27%
2008	4,331	63.19%	2,336	34.08%	187	2.73%
2012	4,148	63.73%	2,110	32.42%	251	3.86%
2016	4,409	69.17%	1,279	20.07%	686	10.76%
2020	5,014	75.24%	1,427	21.41%	223	3.35%
2024	4,952	77.53%	1,274	19.95%	161	2.52%

The Wyoming State Penitentiary, operated by the Wyoming Department of Corrections, is located in Rawlins. The facility was operated by the Wyoming Board of Charities and Reform until that agency was dissolved as a result of a state constitutional amendment passed in November 1990.

== Communities ==
=== City ===
- Rawlins (county seat)

=== Towns ===
- Baggs
- Dixon
- Elk Mountain
- Encampment
- Hanna
- Medicine Bow
- Riverside
- Saratoga
- Sinclair

=== Census-designated places ===
- Arlington
- Ryan Park

=== Unincorporated communities ===
- Leo
- McFadden
- Muddy Gap
- Savery
- Walcott
- Woodedge

• Fort Steele

== Education ==
The county has two school districts: Carbon County School District Number 1 and Carbon County School District Number 2.

== See also ==
- National Register of Historic Places listings in Carbon County, Wyoming
- Wyoming
  - List of cities and towns in Wyoming
  - List of counties in Wyoming
  - Wyoming statistical areas
