= Baker House =

Baker House may refer to:

== Buildings ==
=== In Australia ===
- Baker House (Bacchus Marsh, Victoria)

=== In the United States ===
- Collums-Baker House, Bee Branch, Arkansas
- Baker House (North Little Rock, Arkansas) in Pulaski County
- Pearl Baker Row House, Rancho Santa Fe, California, NRHP-listed in San Diego County
- Baker House (Sea Ranch, California)
- Baker House (Fort Collins, Colorado), NRHP-listed in Larimer County
- Baker House, historic home of David Hume Baker in Orange Home, Florida
- Samuel Baker House (Elfers, Florida) in Pasco County
- Bond-Baker-Carter House, Royston, Georgia, NRHP-listed in Franklin County
- James V. and Sophia Baker House, Cottonwood in Idaho County
- George Baker House, Glen Ellyn, Illinois in DuPage County
- Bressmer-Baker House, Springfield, Illinois in Sangamon County
- Frank J. Baker House, Wilmette, Illinois in Cook County
- C.H. Baker Double House, Des Moines, Iowa in Polk County
- Francis and Harriet Baker House, Atchison, Kansas in Atchison County
- James Baker House (Burkesville, Kentucky) in Cumberland County
- Paschal Todd Baker House, Carrollton, Kentucky, NRHP-listed in Carroll County
- Baker-Hawkins House, Louisville, Kentucky, NRHP-listed in Portland, Louisville, Kentucky
- Fuller-Baker Log House, Grantsville, Maryland
- James B. Baker House, Aberdeen, Maryland
- Hugh P. Baker House, Amherst, Massachusetts, a dormitory at the University of Massachusetts Amherst
- Abbot-Baker House, Andover, Massachusetts
- Benjamin Baker Jr. House, Barnstable, Massachusetts in Barnstable County
- Capt. Seth Baker Jr. House, Barnstable, Massachusetts in Barnstable County
- Nathaniel Baker House, Barnstable, Massachusetts in Barnstable County
- Baker House, Cambridge, Massachusetts, a dormitory at MIT
- Baker House (Rehoboth, Massachusetts)
- Charles Baker House, Waltham, Massachusetts
- Kenelum Baker House, Winchester, Massachusetts
- Peter Baker Three-Decker, Worcester, Massachusetts in Worcester County
- Henry W. Baker House, Plymouth, Michigan
- Sylvester Marion and Frances Anne Stephens Baker House, Montgomery City, Missouri in Montgomery County
- I.G. Baker House, Fort Benton, Montana, NRHP-listed in Chouteau County
- Baker–Brearley House, Lawrenceville, New Jersey
- J. Thompson Baker House, Wildwood City, New Jersey
- Millhiser-Baker Farm, Roswell, New Mexico
- Baker-Merrill House, Easton, New York
- J. and E. Baker Cobblestone Farmstead, Macedon, New York in New York
- George F. Baker Jr. and Sr. Houses, New York, New York, listed on the NRHP in New York
- Sebastian Baker Stone House, Rochester, New York
- Cullins-Baker House, Smalls Crossroads, North Carolina
- Jennings-Baker House, Reidsville, North Carolina
- Latham-Baker House, Greensboro, North Carolina
- John S. Baker House, Cincinnati, Ohio
- John C. Baker House, Mechanicsburg, Ohio, NRHP-listed in Champaign County
- O.T. Baker House, Wellington, Ohio, NRHP-listed in Lorain County
- W. C. Baker House, Altus, Oklahoma
- Sophenia Ish Baker House, Medford, Oregon, NRHP-listed in Jackson County
- Hiram Baker House, Lebanon, Oregon, NRHP-listed in Linn County
- Horace Baker Log Cabin, Carver, Oregon in Clackamas County
- David S. Baker Estate, North Kingstown, Rhode Island in Washington County
- William Baker House, Gaston, South Carolina in Calhoun County
- Baker House (Alcester, South Dakota) in Union County
- Joseph Baker House, Hereford, South Dakota, NRHP-listed in Meade County
- Baker Bungalow, Spearfish, South Dakota, NRHP-listed in Lawrence County
- J. T. Baker Farmstead, Blum, Texas, NRHP-listed in Hill County, Texas
- Charles H. and Catherine B. Baker House, Goliad, Texas, NRHP-listed in Goliad County
- Baker-Carmichael House, Granbury, Texas, NRHP-listed in Hood County
- Baker House (Yoakum, Texas), NRHP-listed in Lavaca County
- George Washington Baker House, Mendon, Utah
- Samuel Baker House (Mendon, Utah)
- Baker-St. John House, Abingdon, Virginia in Washington County
- Newton D. Baker House, Washington, D.C.
- Michael Baker House, also known as Alexander W. Arbuckle I House, Lewisburg, West Virginia, NRHP-listed
- Baker House 1885, also known as Robert H. Baker House, Lake Geneva, Wisconsin, NRHP-listed in Walworth County as "Redwood Cottage"
- Jim Baker Cabin, Savery, Wyoming in Carbon County

== Arts, entertainment and media ==
- Baker House (Resident Evil), a fictional Louisiana mansion

== See also ==
- Baker Farm (disambiguation)
- James Baker House (disambiguation)
- John Baker House (disambiguation)
- Samuel Baker House (disambiguation)
- Baker House (Bacchus Marsh, Victoria)
