= James Baker House =

James Baker House may refer to:

- James V. and Sophia Baker House, Cottonwood, Idaho, listed on the NRHP in Idaho County, Idaho
- James Baker House (Burkesville, Kentucky), listed on the NRHP in Kentucky
- James B. Baker House, Aberdeen, Maryland, listed on the NRHP in Maryland
- Jim Baker Cabin, Savery, Wyoming, listed on the NRHP in Carbon County, Wyoming
