= DWX =

DWX may refer to:

- DWX, a line of semiautomatic pistols by Dan Wesson Firearms
- DWX (business), a Syrian stock exchange
- DWX (railway station), an Indian railway junction station
- Dixon Airport, Dixon, Wyoming (IATA code: DWX)
