= Baker House (Rehoboth, Massachusetts) =

Historic house in Massachusetts, United States

- U.S. National Register of Historic Places
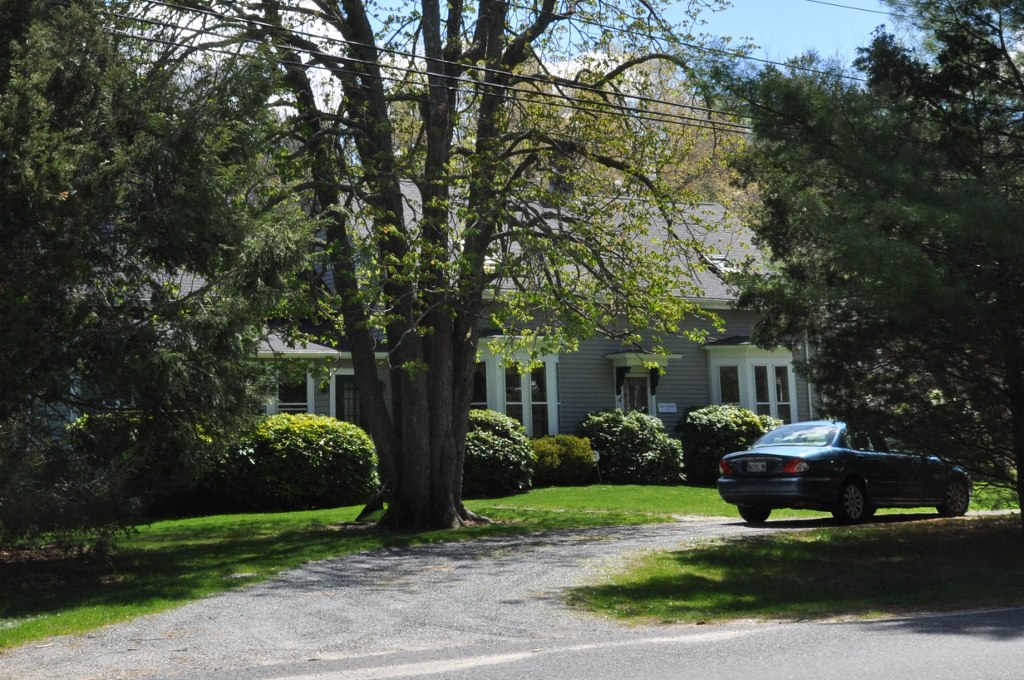

- Location within Massachusetts Location within the United States
- Location: 191 Hornbine St., Rehoboth, Massachusetts
- Coordinates: 41°47′32″N 71°12′1″W
- Area: 3.2 acres (1.3 ha)
- Architectural style: Italianate
- MPS: Rehoboth MRA
- NRHP reference No.: 83000622
- Added to NRHP: June 6, 1983

The Baker House is a historic house at 191 Hornbine Street in Rehoboth, Massachusetts. This two-family house was built c. 1875–90, and is a rare period duplex in the town. It was listed on the National Register of Historic Places in 1983.

== Description and history ==
The Baker House stands in a rural area of southern Rehoboth, on the east side of Hornbine Street north of its junction with Spring Street. It is a 1 1/2-story wood-frame structure, with a side-gable roof and clapboard exterior. It is extended to the sides by flanking single story ells. The main facade is three bays wide, with polygonal bays flanking a single center entrance. The bays each have a pair of windows facing front, and single windows on the angled sides, with wooden panels below. The center entrance is sheltered by a hood with heavy Italianate brackets, the exterior's only significant stylistic adornment. A simpler entrance is found in the rightmost bay of the northern (left) ell, whose porch has also been enclosed. Small ells were also added to the rear in the 1930s.

The house was built sometime between about 1875 and 1890, based on its style. It is said to have been built for the twin Baker brothers, John and Jim, descended from early settlers of the area. Duplexes are rare in the town, and this one is the only one known from the late 19th century.

== See also ==
- House at 197 Hornbine Road, just to the south
- Capt. Mial Pierce Farm, 177 Hornbine Street, a short way to the north
- National Register of Historic Places listings in Bristol County, Massachusetts
