= Samuel Baker House =

Samuel Baker House may refer to

- Samuel Baker House (Elfers, Florida), listed on the NRHP in Florida
- Samuel Baker House (Mendon, Utah), listed on the NRHP in Utah
