= Baker Farm =

Baker Farm may refer to:

- Baker Farm (Keedysville, Maryland) in Maryland
- Millhiser-Baker Farm, Roswell, New Mexico
- J. and E. Baker Cobblestone Farmstead, Macedon, New York
- Baker Farm (Bunn, North Carolina)
- J. T. Baker Farmstead, Blum, TX, listed on the NRHP in Texas
