= Parker House (Winchester, Massachusetts) =

Historic house in Massachusetts, United States

- U.S. National Register of Historic Places
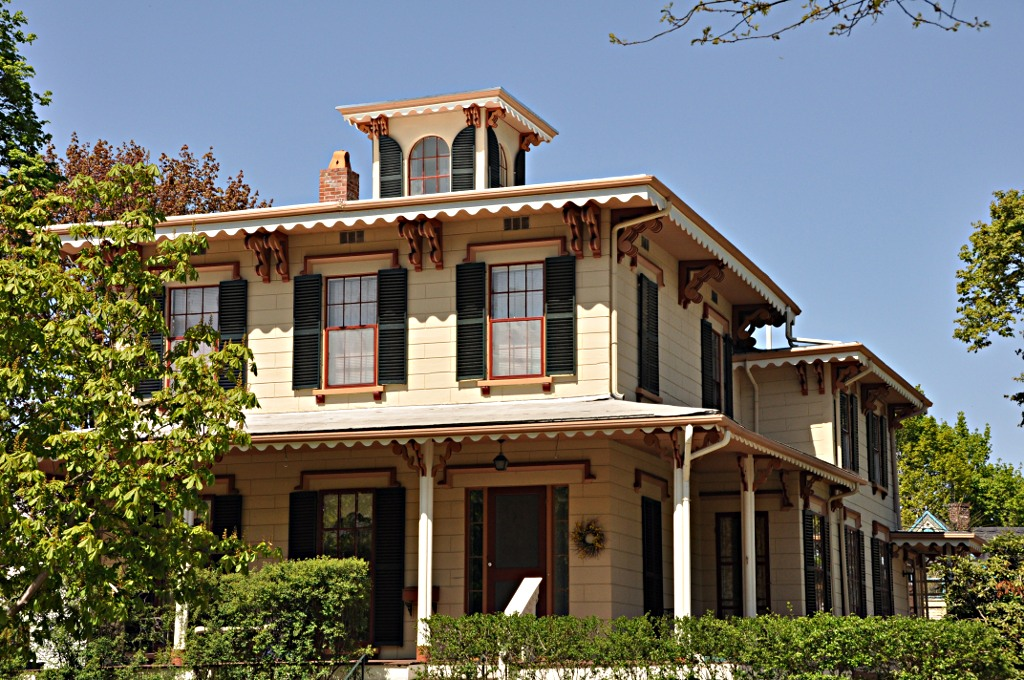

- Location within Massachusetts Location within the United States
- Location: 180 Mystic Valley Parkway, Winchester, Massachusetts
- Coordinates: 42°26′56″N 71°7′59″W
- Built: 1850
- Architect: Kenelum Baker
- Architectural style: Italianate
- MPS: Winchester MRA
- NRHP reference No.: 89000628
- Added to NRHP: July 5, 1989

The Parker House is a historic house in Winchester, Massachusetts. This two story wood-frame house was probably built in the 1850s by Kenelum Baker, a local builder, and is an elaborately styled Italianate house. It has wide eaves studded with paired brackets, and the porch, eave, and cupola all have a simple scalloped molding. The square cupola has round-arch windows, and the porch wraps around three sides of the house.

The house was listed on the National Register of Historic Places in 1989.

== See also ==
- Kenelum Baker House, the builder's house
- National Register of Historic Places listings in Winchester, Massachusetts
