= Jim Mountain =

Mountain in Wyoming, United States

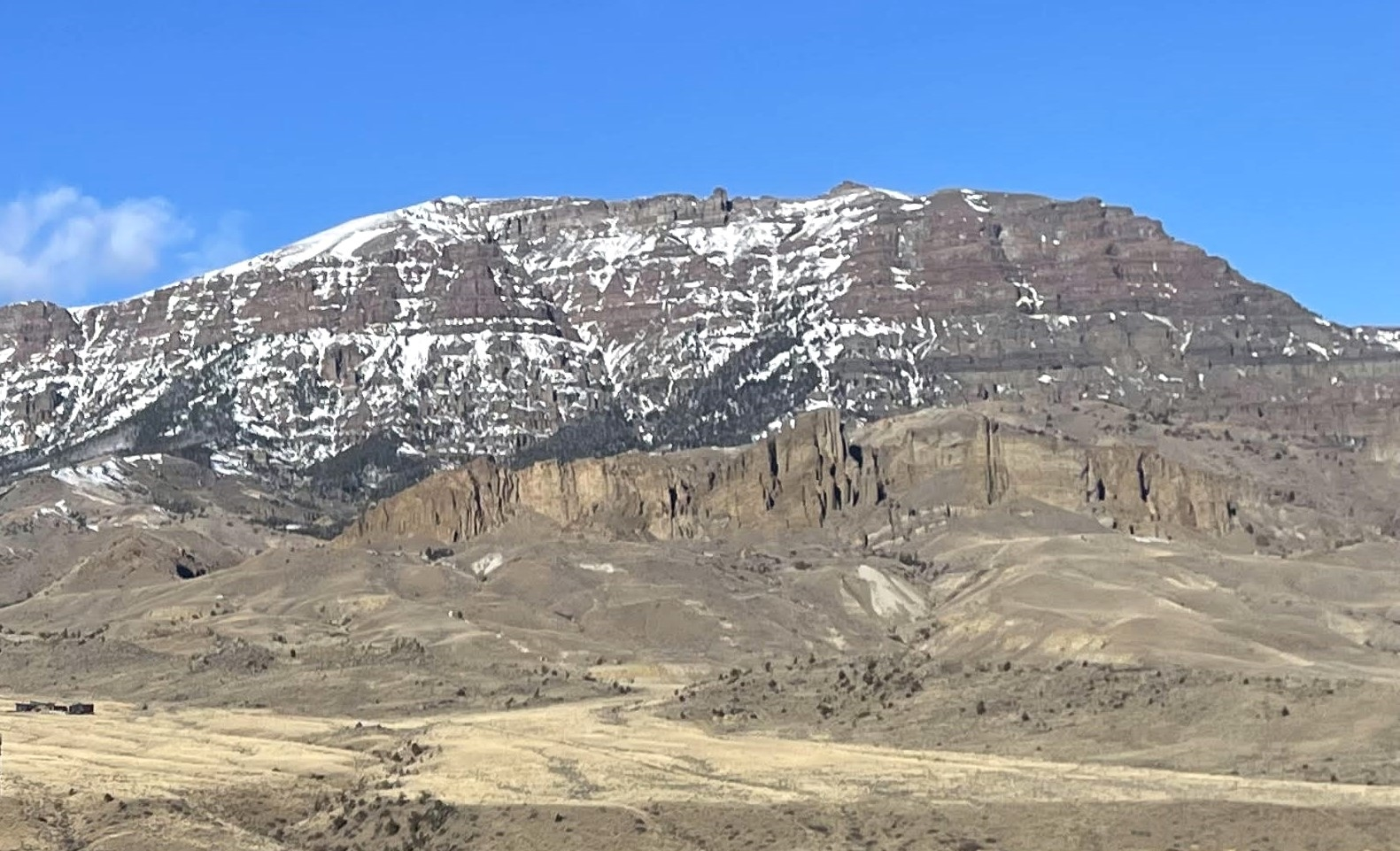
- South aspect

Highest point
- Elevation: 10,430 ft (3,179 m)
- Prominence: 670 ft (204 m)
- Parent peak: Peak 12132
- Isolation: 5.28 mi (8.50 km)
- Coordinates: 44°31′45″N 109°28′28″W

Naming
- Etymology: Jim Baker

Geography
- Location within Wyoming Location within the United States
- Country: United States
- State: Wyoming
- County: Park
- Protected area: North Absaroka Wilderness
- Parent range: Absaroka Range; Rocky Mountains
- Topo map: USGS Jim Mountain

Geology
- Rock type: volcanic breccia

Climbing
- Easiest route: class 2

Jim Mountain is a 10,430-foot-elevation (3,179-meter) summit in Park County, Wyoming, United States.

== Description ==
The mountain is situated 20 miles (32.2 km) west of the town of Cody and can be seen from Highway 20 approximately midway between Cody and Yellowstone National Park. It is set in the Absaroka Range along the boundary of North Absaroka Wilderness on land managed by Shoshone National Forest. Precipitation runoff from the mountain drains into tributaries of the Shoshone River. Topographic relief is significant as the south aspect rises 4,830 feet (1,470 meters) above North Fork Shoshone River in four miles (6.4 km) and the east aspect rises 2,000 feet (610 meters) above Jim Creek in one mile (1.6 km).

== Etymology ==
Jim Mountain is named after Jim Baker (1818–1898), frontiersman, trapper, army scout, interpreter, and rancher. The mountain's toponym has been officially adopted by the United States Board on Geographic Names.

== Climate ==
According to the Köppen climate classification system, Jim Mountain is located in a semi-arid climate zone with cold, snowy winters, and cool to warm summers. Winter temperatures can drop below −10 °F with wind chill factors below −30 °F. Due to its altitude, it receives precipitation all year, as snow in winter and as thunderstorms in summer, with a dry period in late spring.

Climate data for Jim Mountain 44.5345 N, 109.4766 W, Elevation: 10,036 ft (3,059 m) (1991–2020 normals)
Month	Jan	Feb	Mar	Apr	May	Jun	Jul	Aug	Sep	Oct	Nov	Dec	Year
Mean daily maximum °F (°C)	24.3 (−4.3)	24.5 (−4.2)	30.5 (−0.8)	35.7 (2.1)	44.9 (7.2)	55.4 (13.0)	66.3 (19.1)	65.4 (18.6)	55.5 (13.1)	41.8 (5.4)	29.8 (−1.2)	23.5 (−4.7)	41.5 (5.3)
Daily mean °F (°C)	16.0 (−8.9)	15.3 (−9.3)	20.5 (−6.4)	25.3 (−3.7)	34.3 (1.3)	43.8 (6.6)	53.6 (12.0)	52.8 (11.6)	43.9 (6.6)	31.8 (−0.1)	21.5 (−5.8)	15.3 (−9.3)	31.2 (−0.4)
Mean daily minimum °F (°C)	7.7 (−13.5)	6.2 (−14.3)	10.5 (−11.9)	15.0 (−9.4)	23.8 (−4.6)	32.3 (0.2)	40.9 (4.9)	40.3 (4.6)	32.3 (0.2)	21.7 (−5.7)	13.1 (−10.5)	7.1 (−13.8)	20.9 (−6.1)
Average precipitation inches (mm)	1.96 (50)	2.04 (52)	2.46 (62)	3.89 (99)	3.96 (101)	2.68 (68)	1.46 (37)	1.53 (39)	2.06 (52)	2.38 (60)	2.67 (68)	1.80 (46)	28.89 (734)
Source: PRISM Climate Group

Trout Peak is a high mountain peak about 5 miles north of Jim Mountain.

Climate data for Trout Peak 44.6012 N, 109.5263 W, Elevation: 11,824 ft (3,604 m) (1991–2020 normals)
Month	Jan	Feb	Mar	Apr	May	Jun	Jul	Aug	Sep	Oct	Nov	Dec	Year
Mean daily maximum °F (°C)	18.8 (−7.3)	18.0 (−7.8)	22.9 (−5.1)	29.0 (−1.7)	38.1 (3.4)	48.3 (9.1)	58.7 (14.8)	57.9 (14.4)	48.9 (9.4)	36.1 (2.3)	24.0 (−4.4)	18.0 (−7.8)	34.9 (1.6)
Daily mean °F (°C)	9.7 (−12.4)	8.0 (−13.3)	12.3 (−10.9)	17.4 (−8.1)	26.2 (−3.2)	35.5 (1.9)	44.8 (7.1)	44.2 (6.8)	35.9 (2.2)	24.5 (−4.2)	15.0 (−9.4)	9.2 (−12.7)	23.6 (−4.7)
Mean daily minimum °F (°C)	0.6 (−17.4)	−1.9 (−18.8)	1.7 (−16.8)	5.8 (−14.6)	14.3 (−9.8)	22.8 (−5.1)	30.9 (−0.6)	30.4 (−0.9)	22.9 (−5.1)	12.9 (−10.6)	5.9 (−14.5)	0.4 (−17.6)	12.2 (−11.0)
Average precipitation inches (mm)	4.30 (109)	4.86 (123)	5.03 (128)	5.12 (130)	5.60 (142)	3.76 (96)	1.80 (46)	1.77 (45)	2.67 (68)	4.03 (102)	5.13 (130)	4.01 (102)	48.08 (1,221)
Source: PRISM Climate Group

== See also ==
- List of mountain peaks of Wyoming
