= John Baker House =

John Baker House may refer to:

- John S. Baker House, Cincinnati, Ohio, listed on the National Register of Historic Places (NRHP)
- John C. Baker House, Mechanicsburg, Ohio, NRHP-listed in Champaign County, Ohio

== See also ==
- Baker House (disambiguation)
