= Stockgrowers Bank =

- U.S. National Register of Historic Places
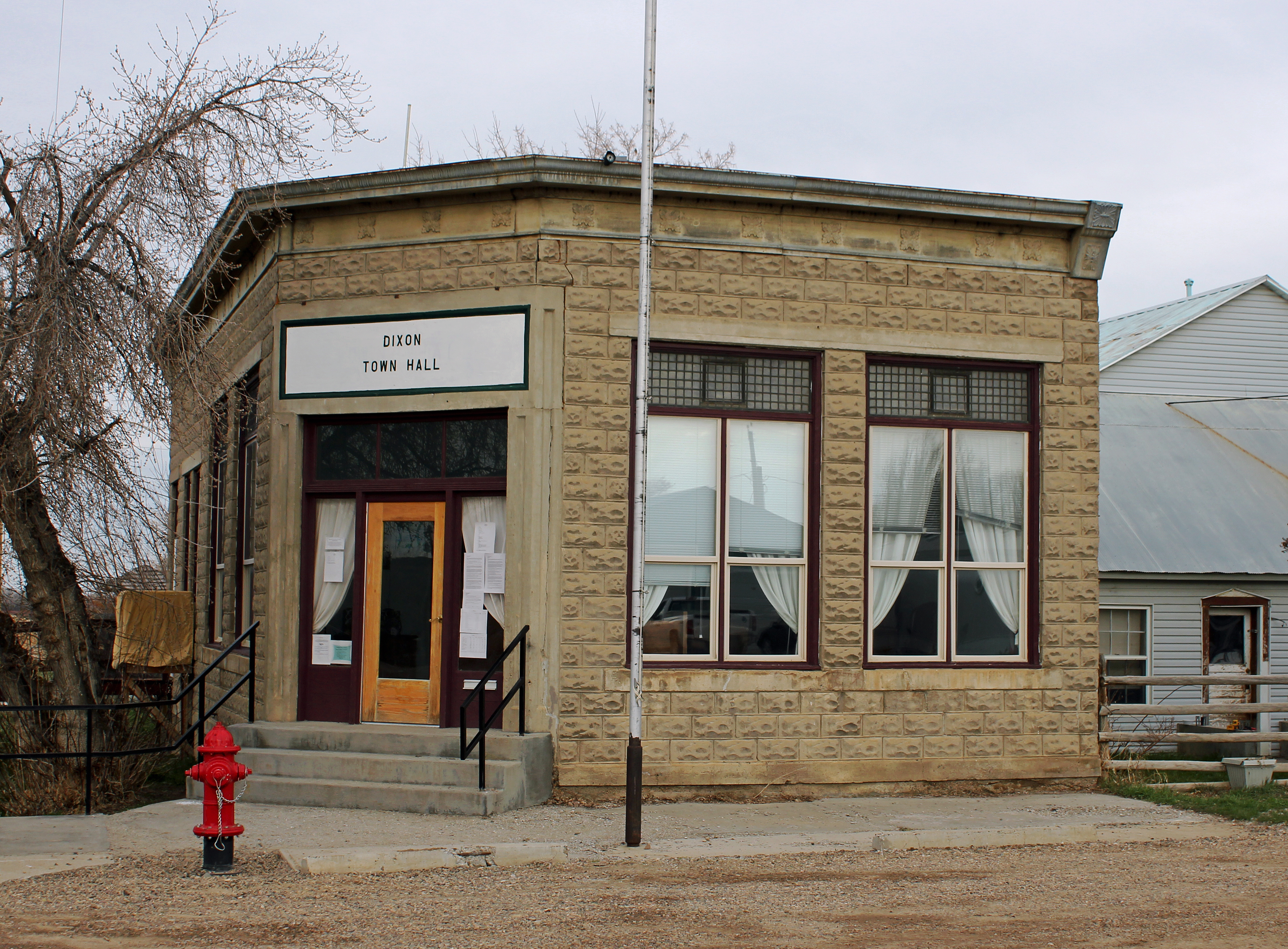
- Dixon Town Hall in 2014

- Location within Wyoming
- Location: Third St., Dixon, Wyoming
- Coordinates: 41°2′4″N 107°32′8″W
- Area: 0.5 acres (0.20 ha)
- Built: 1916
- NRHP reference No.: 86001393
- Added to NRHP: June 25, 1986

The Stockgrowers Bank, also known as the Dixon Town Hall, was built in Dixon, Wyoming in 1916. The decorated concrete masonry building was the bank's headquarters until the bank was dissolved in 1923. Following the bank's demise the building served as a soda fountain into the 1940s, which was followed by a store, then the Little Snake River Veterans of Foreign Wars Post 10051 hall. In 1975 it became the town hall.

The one-story building is rectangular with an angled facade. The building uses rock face-ornamented concrete block for most of the facade and features large show windows with gridded mullion transoms. The front has a metal cornice with egg-and-dart stampings. The building rests on a concrete foundation with a basement beneath. The interior has a large main room with a smaller room in back with a toilet and the bank's vault. The interior is finished with wood floors and plaster walls.

The Stockgrowers Bank was placed on the National Register of Historic Places on June 25, 1986.
