= Jim Baker (frontiersman) =

American explorer

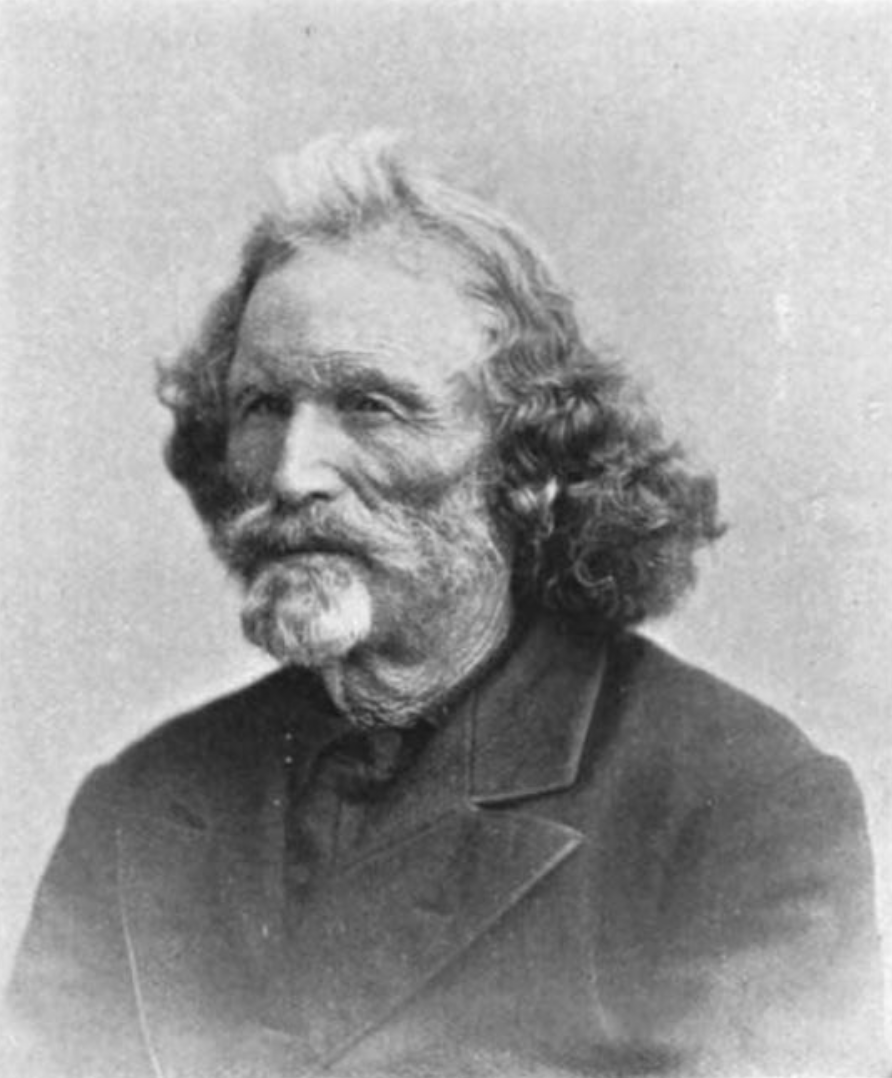
- 65 years of age, ca. 1883
- Born: December 19, 1818; Belleville, St. Clair County, Illinois
- Died: May 15, 1898 (aged 79); Savery, Carbon County, Wyoming
- Resting place: Baker Cemetery, Savery, Carbon County, Wyoming
- Other name: Honest Jim Baker
- Occupations: frontiersman, trapper, hunter, fur trader, army scout, rancher
- Employer: American Fur Company
- Known for: Being a fur trapper and hunter, with Jim Bridger and Kit Carson, and a U.S. Army scout and Indian interpreter, for Generals William S. Harney, Albert S. Johnston, and George Custer
- Spouses: Married to least three Native American women: Marina, daughter of Shoshone chief Washakie; Meeteetse (Little Traveler) who Baker called Mary; Eliza Yanetse
- Children: 14

Jim Baker (1818–1898), known as "Honest Jim Baker", was a frontiersman, trapper, hunter, army scout, interpreter, and rancher. He was first a trapper and hunter. The decline of the fur trade in the early 1840s drove many trappers to quit, but Baker remained in the business until 1855. During that time he was a friend of Jim Bridger, Kit Carson and John C. Frémont. On August 21, 1841, he was among a group of twenty three trappers who were attacked by Arapaho, Cheyenne, and Sioux on what became known as Battle Mountain. After Henry Fraeb was killed, Baker organized the trappers against the Native Americans in a multiple-day fight.

While he was a trapper, he developed expertise as a guide, leader, marksman, and interpreter with Native Americans. He operated a ferry and trading post along the Green River. He served the military as a tracker and guide, including during the Mormon Utah War, following the Meeker Massacre, and during the Battle of the Rosebud in present day Big Horn County, Montana.

He had at least three Native American wives and fourteen children. He homesteaded on what is now Clear Creek near Denver on July 3, 1859. The area became known as Baker's Crossing, and he established several businesses there. He raised cattle, operated a stone coal (anthracite) mine, a toll bridge on the Denver Boulder Wagon Road, and a store operated by two of his wives. In 1873, Baker built a cabin with a guard tower near the Little Snake River in Wyoming, where he raised livestock until his death in 1898. His cabin is currently on display at the Little Snake River Museum in Savery, Wyoming. Baker's grave is marked with a stone at Baker Cemetery near Savery.

== Early life ==
James Baker was born on December 19, 1818, in Belleville, St. Clair County, Illinois, a few miles from St. Louis, Missouri. His parents were Phoebe Neeley and William Baker, who were Scot-Irish farmers from the Nashville, Tennessee, area. They were both born in Tennessee and moved to Illinois as young adults. They had eight children, one born in Belleville and the rest in Sangamon County. His parents operated a mill along the Sangamon River.

Baker had sisters Eliza, Elizabeth, and Adelia and a brother John. He learned to hunt for game with a gun and fish as a child. He and his siblings had little education. When he was seventeen, his father sent him to his grandfather at St. Louis for schooling, but he was sent home when it was clear he had no interest in education. Interested in living a life on the frontier, he went to the American Fur Company in St. Louis to sign up to be a trapper.

== Fur trapper and hunter ==
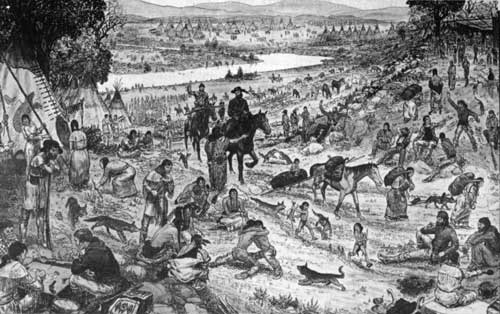
Rocky Mountain Rendezvous scene at which trappers and mountain men sold their furs and hides and replenished their supplies.

Baker was hired by Jim Bridger to work for the American Fur Company for 18 months, for which he received $465 (equivalent to $14,059 in 2025). On May 15, 1838, (Note: It was also said that he first worked for the American Fur Company in May 22, 1839.) he left St. Louis by boat and traveled up the Mississippi and Missouri Rivers to the Uinta Mountains of present day Utah and Wyoming. Baker led a pack train to the Rocky Mountain Rendezvous in the Wind River Valley for Jim Bridger. He hunted with Bridger and Kit Carson and in 1840 returned home to Illinois and St. Louis after his contract expired. He then signed up for another several years with the fur company.

Baker traveled on the steamer St. Peter upriver to Westport on May 22, 1839. With missionaries and 75 men, Baker was on an eight-day expedition that traveled through lands of the Arikara, who were known for their hostility. Led by Thomas Fitzpatrick, it was bound for Fort Bonneville in what is now west-central Wyoming.

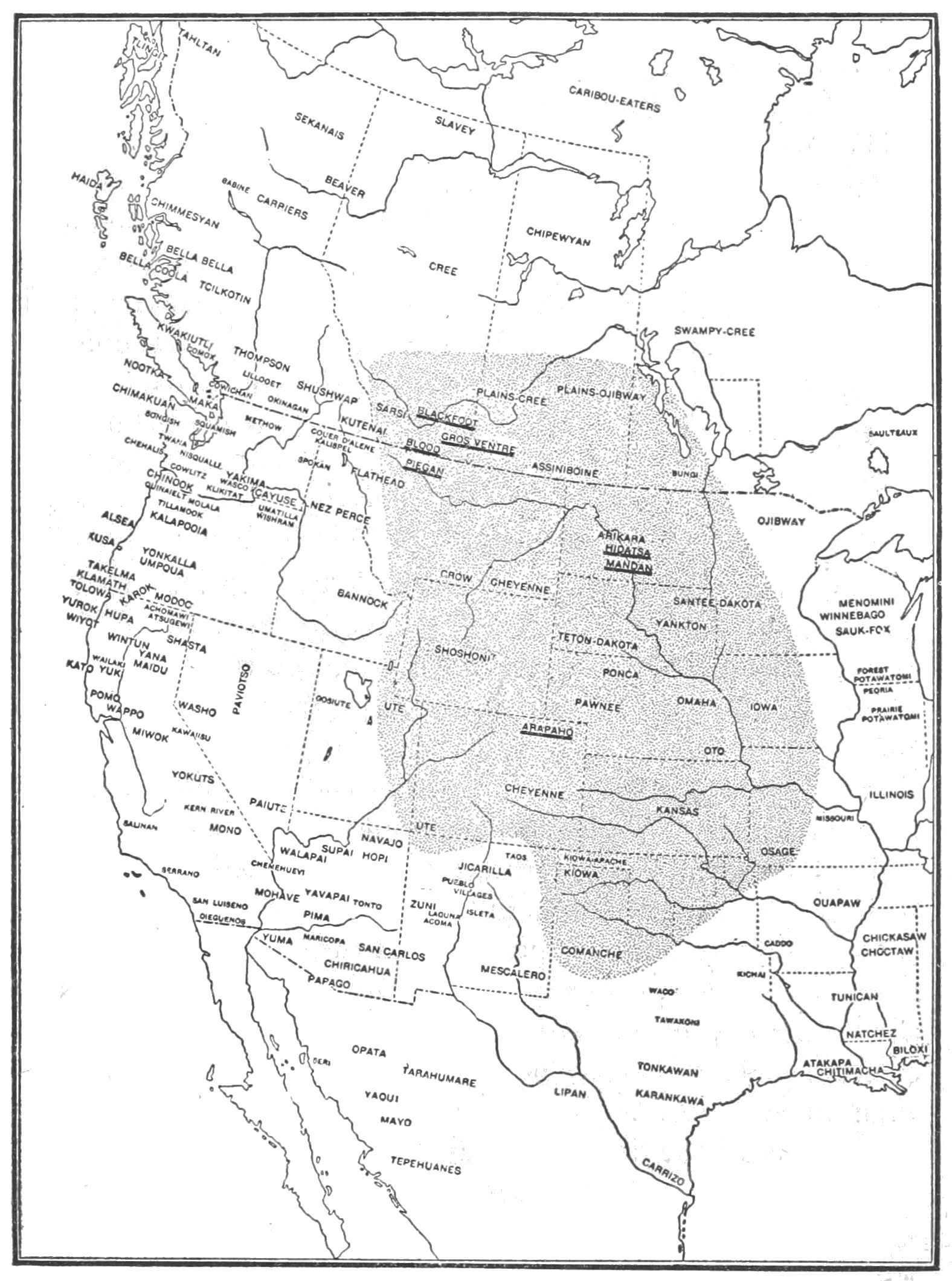
Native American lands west of the Mississippi River

Baker traveled with the Bartleson–Bidwell Party headed for California in May 1841. It was the first wagon train to travel overland on the Oregon Trail. Baker traveled from the Green River, to Bridger's camp at the Henry's Fork, arriving in early August. Bridger, who was worried about his overdue associate Henry Fraeb, sent Baker and others to search for the lost party and to warn them of increased hostility among the Plains Indians. Fraeb was found at the base of Squaw Mountain on the banks of the Little Snake River and Battle Creek, near what is now the border between Wyoming and Colorado. (Note: Snodgrass states that Fraeb and his party were found along the Yampa River at the Colorado and Wyoming border.) Baker hunted near Fraeb's camp on August 21, 1841. Twenty three trappers were attacked by 500 Arapaho, Cheyenne, and Sioux. After Fraeb was killed, Baker took charge of the battle that extended over two to six days. The trappers hid behind stumps, dug pits, and created a defensive barrier of dead horses and logs. The battle ended after a Native American chief's horse was shot and fell over. Four trappers were killed. Most of the trappers' horses were killed, with more than 100 horses dead from both sides. Legend has it that 35 or 100 Native Americans were killed, but those numbers may be exaggerated. Baker and other survivors returned to Bridger's camp on the Green River on August 27. The mountain was later renamed Battle Mountain.

Baker continued to hunt and trap in the Henry's Fork area independent of a fur company. He was often with Kit Carson, Jim Bridger, his brother John Baker, and others. They got along well with the Shoshone, but the Arapaho and Snake people sometimes stole their collection of furs that they collected over a summer. He became known for his skills as a frontiersman:

Next to Jim Bridger, he was the most intrepid, skillful, and accomplished plainsman and mountaineer in all that region. He was a generous, noble-hearted specimen of the trapper type, who would peril his life for a friend at any time, or divide with him his last morsel of food.

— James Lee Humfreville, Twenty Years Among Our Savage Indians

His younger brother John, called "Beaver John" on the frontier, was also a trapper, hunter, and scout. He hunted and trapped with his brother Jim, Kit Carson, Jim Bridger and Jack Robinson. His brother married a Shoshone woman and established a cattle ranch near Henry's Fork in Wyoming.

Jim Baker, sculpture by Steve Boyce

Jim Baker was known for his skills as a marksman, archer, horseman, tracker, hunter, and lariat thrower. When hunting with a group of people, Baker generally took the lead and was the fastest rider of the men. He was also a competent Native American sign language communicator and spoke a number of Native American languages. He was known for his ability to guide, even where there were no evident trails. He had a good knowledge of the geography of the west, guiding others around rivers, lakes, canyons, and other geographical features. Based upon his reputation, he became a good friend of John C. Frémont.

Baker camped with the Shoshone in the Wind River area, assuming the clothing and lifestyle of the Native Americans. They lived near present-day Medicine Bow, Wyoming. Marina, the daughter of the band's chief, and a girl named Winona were kidnapped by a group of Blackfeet. Baker rescued the young women and was married to Marina in October 1847. She gave her groom an emblem of bravery, a bear claw necklace. (Note: Humfreville stated that Baker lived among the Snake people and married a Snake woman. (Snake people was a collective name given to the Northern Paiute, Bannock, and Shoshone Native American tribes.)) Baker continued to live with his wife's tribe, as was common when mountain men married Native American woman. Baker was adopted into the Shoshone tribe and given the name "Red-Haired Shoshone" in 1847. He was engaged in conflicts with Cheyenne, Sioux, and Crows. He was said to have never been wounded in battle, yet it was also said that his body was covered with scars from battles, bear fights, and riding accidents.

It became increasingly difficult to make a living trapping and hunting furs. Beaver had been fairly well trapped out by the 1840s. In addition, there was shift in fashion away from fur and to silk hats, so there was not much of a demand for beaver hats.

Routes of the California, Mormon and Oregon Trails west of the Rocky Mountains

Baker operated at least one trading post and ferry stop on the Oregon - California - Mormon Trails along the Green River south to Salt Lake City. As Mormons moved into the area, they established towns. Shoshone, Utes, Mormons, mountain men, and new immigrants vied for land and resources.

Baker hunted with Baker and Carson into the fall of 1852. They traveled through what are now the states of New Mexico, Colorado, Wyoming, and back to New Mexico. It was their last trip together and he ended his career as a trapper and hunter in 1855.

== Scout ==
Baker was a guide and interpreter between the Mississippi River and the Pacific Ocean for 34 years. In 1845, he helped herd 4,000 wild horses from Mexican land in what is now Southern California. In 1847, Baker was in the Salt Lake City, Utah, region, where he worked for a railroad party as a scout and guide.

In 1855, Baker was the chief scout at Fort Laramie, serving under General William Harney. Two years later, he guided Colonel Albert Sidney Johnston and his troops in a column against the Mormons and to Fort Bridger during the Mormon Utah War (1857–1858). The Mormon militia had run off or stole the fort's livestock. Baker led Captain R.B. Marcy's detachment through Colorado to New Mexico to purchase mules at Fort Union or Fort Massachusetts. They were challenged by frigid weather and deep snow. Marcy later said that the party would have died of hunger and the treacherous weather without the expert scout's leadership. On their return, the troops passed through present-day Denver area and discovered gold at Cherry Creek in early 1858.

While practicing with his Spencer carbine weapon, the magazine exploded, which injured his face and blew his right thumb off its hand. His lips, tongue, chin, and teeth were lacerated. He was also injured in the chest and his right lung. The injury occurred along Cherry Creek, about 20 miles from present-day Denver, where he was taken and was treated by a surgeon.

== Colorado and Wyoming ==
On July 3, 1859, Baker took up a homestead west of Denver along Vasquez Creek (now Clear Creek). The area became known as Baker's Crossing, where he established several businesses, at what is now 53rd and Tennyson in northwest Denver. He built an adobe house and raised cattle. He operated a stone coal (anthracite) mine, a toll bridge on the Denver Boulder Wagon Road, and a store operated by his two wives. His customers were European American settlers and Native Americans.

In 1864, Baker was appointed a captain in the Colorado Militia along with John Chivington, who later lead the Colorado Territorial forces in the infamous Sand Creek Massacre. He worked for Indian Agent Daniel Chessman Oakes as a guide. Horses and mules had been stolen by Southern Arapahoe. In retaliation, Baker and others raided Little Raven and his band.

He led a railroad survey party to Salt Lake in 1872. In 1873, Baker left Colorado and bought a ranch in the Little Snake River Valley near Savery, Wyoming. He built a hand-hewn log cabin, that looked like and served as a fort for settlers following the Meeker Massacre (September 29, 1879). Baker raised cattle, which he branded with "JB".

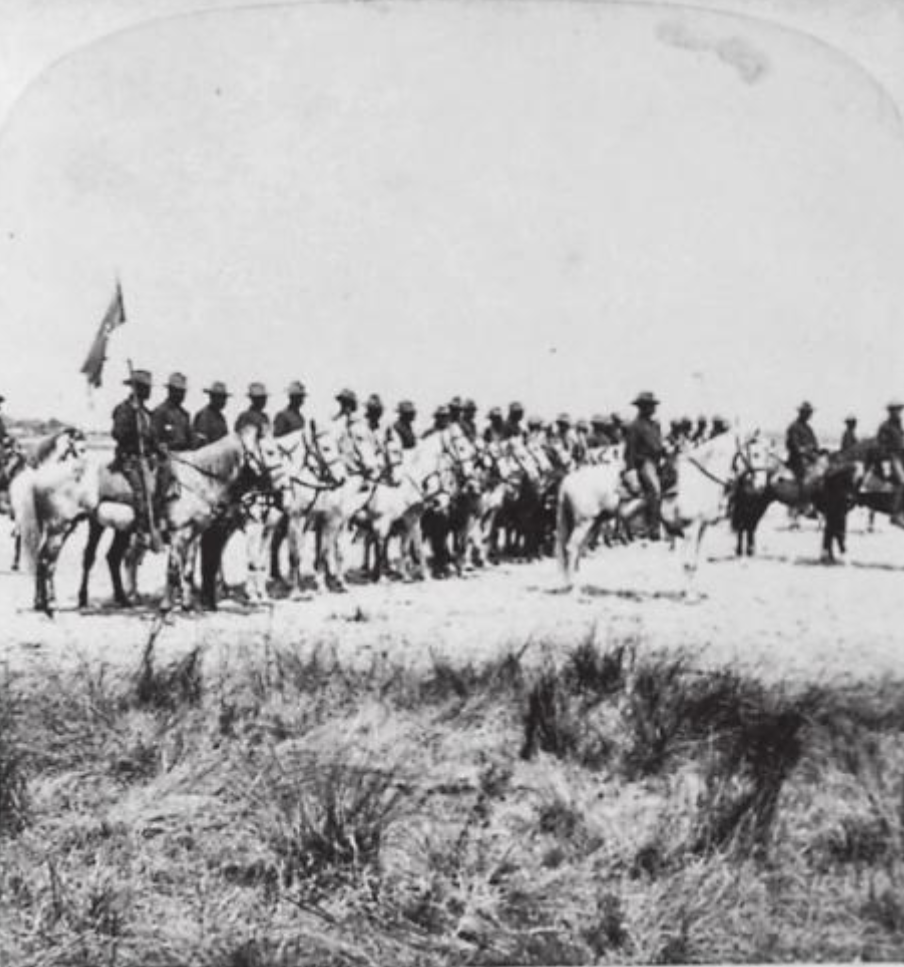
Troop A, Ninth U.S, Cavalry, Strohmeyer & Wyman. Following the Meeker Massacre in 1879, Jim Baker scouted for the Wyoming cavalry as they followed the Utes responsible for the attack

He guided an Indian agent and separately guided Colonel Wesley Merritt following the massacre. As European American gold prospectors encroached on Oglala Lakota’s land at French Creek in the Badlands, tensions grew about who had rights to the land. Baker served under General George Armstrong Custer during the Battle of the Rosebud in the Black Hills against Crazy Horse, the Oglala Lakota chief in 1876. Following the Meeker Massacre, the United States Cavalry pursued the Utes responsible for the attack. Baker was hired by Major Thomas Tipton Thornburgh as a guide to track the Utes. Fourteen soldiers were killed at a battle at Milk Creek.

== Personal life and death ==
Jim Baker was married three or more times, perhaps with as many as six wives, including women from the Shoshone, Snake, Bannock, and Flathood tribes. He fathered 14 children.

Baker was first married to Marina, the sixteen-year-old daughter of Shoshone chief Washakie, in October 1847. They had three children: Jennieve Jane, William and Joseph. Marina died while Baker was away on an extended hunting trip in 1852. She and some of Baker's children died of smallpox.

Baker fell in love with Flying Fawn, a Sioux woman and daughter of Long Lance. They were about to be married when Flash of Fire, her cousin, prepared to shoot an arrow at Baker out of jealousy. Long Lance killed Flash of Fire, saving Baker's life. It is not known if Baker and Flying Fawn were married. It was also said that Baker saved a Sioux woman from starvation in the 1850s.

His wife Meeteetse (Little Traveler), who Baker called Mary, was a Shoshone woman. They had ten children: Thomas, Buck, Jim, Mary, Isabel, Madeline, Nancy Kate, Liza, and Elsie. With his wife Eliza Yanetse, they had a daughter Jennie. Eliza had twins in 1856, but only one of them survived, and was named James C. Baker. On July 3, 1859, Baker and his family settled at a place known as Baker's Crossing, west of Denver along Clear Creek).

Baker moved near Savery, present-day Carbon County, Wyoming, in 1873, where he had a two-story cabin known as Jim Baker Cabin near the Little Snake River. (Note: The Jim Baker Cabin is located at Savery. He is said to have also lived near Fort Bridger, a military post and trading station and near Baggs, Wyoming. The eastern most place, Savery, is 13 miles east of Baggs, which is 203 miles east and south of Fort Bridger.) The family lived on the first level the second floor was used for storage, or where Baker would sleep after pulling up the ladder from the ground floor. Until 1881, there was a watchtower cupola on top of the second floor, where there was a "commanding view" of the Little Snake River Valley. Shoshone, Ute, and Snake people lived in tipis in the area. By that time, none of his wives were with him and there were only six children who settled with him:

- William homesteaded where the town of Dixon, Wyoming now stands and died in 1893.
- Joseph lived with Baker in 1880 and moved to the Shoshone Reservation at Lander, Wyoming
- Mary married John Runnels, a miner and died at Hahn's Peak, CO in 1880.
- Isabelle lived with Baker in 1880 and married N.B. Kinnear.
- Madeline lived with Baker in 1880 and married Frank Adams.
- Jennie lived with Baker in 1880 and married August Rischke.

Baker continued to live out his life at his cattle ranch and cabin. On May 15, 1898, Baker died at the Jim Baker Cabin. His body was buried in a family cemetery at the base of the mountain named after him, Baker's Peak.

== Legacy ==
In 1917, the Baker Cabin was removed from Savery and taken to Frontier Park in Cheyenne, Wyoming. In July 1976, the home of Jim Baker was returned to Savery, Wyoming and is now located at the Little Snake River Museum. The cabin was reconstructed under the direction of Jim Baker's great-grandson, Paul McAllister of Dixon, Wyoming. Westminster, Colorado, commissioned a statue of Baker. His portrait was created in a stained glass window for the Colorado State Capitol building in Denver.

Jim Mountain in northwest Wyoming is named after him.

== Bibliography ==
- Crutchfield, James A.; Moutlon, Candy; Bene, Terry Del (March 26, 2015). "Baker, James (1818–1898)". The Settlement of America: An Encyclopedia of Westward Expansion from Jamestown to the Closing of the Frontier. Routledge. ISBN 978-1-317-45460-1.
- Humfreville, James Lee (1897). Twenty Years Among Our Savage Indians: A Record of Personal Experiences, Observations, and Adventures Among the Indians of the Wild West. Hartford Publishing Company. p. 580.
- Newark, Peter (1985). Illustrated Encyclopedia Of The Old West. Gallery Books. ISBN 9780831765996.
- Snodgrass, Mary Ellen (2015). Settlers of the American West: The Lives of 231 Notable Pioneers. Jefferson, NC: McFarland & Company, Inc. p. 11. ISBN 9780786497355.
