= Capt. Mial Pierce Farm =

- Captain Mial Pierce Farm
- U.S. National Register of Historic Places
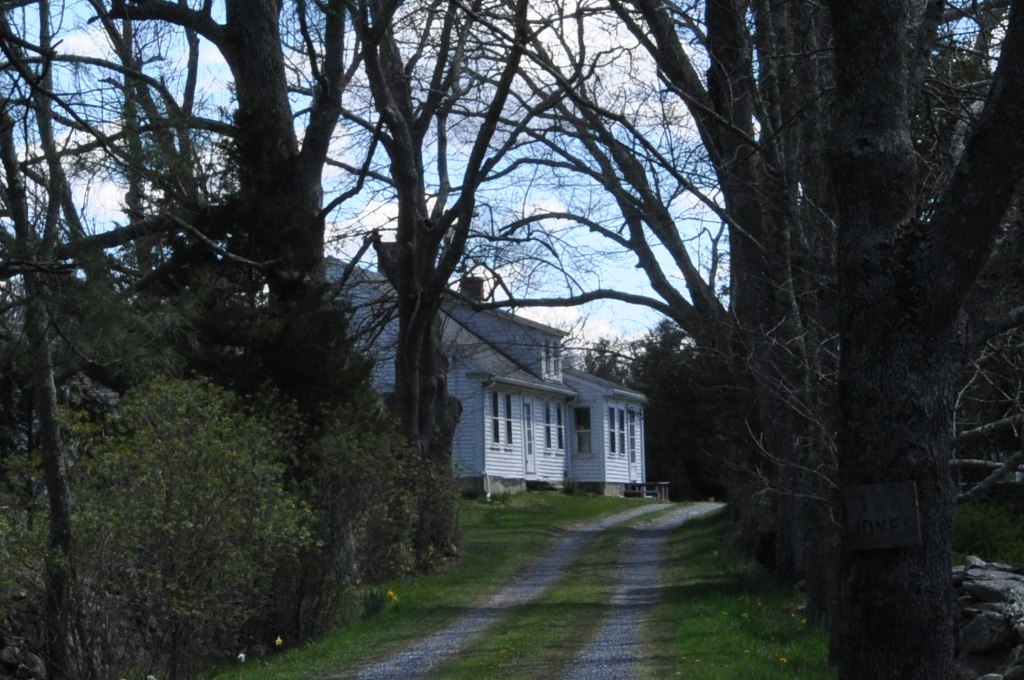

- Location within Massachusetts Location within the United States
- Location: Rehoboth, Massachusetts
- Coordinates: 41°47′41″N 71°11′56″W
- Built: 1800
- Architectural style: Georgian
- MPS: Rehoboth MRA
- NRHP reference No.: 83000703
- Added to NRHP: June 6, 1983

The Capt. Mial Pierce Farm is a historic farm at 177 Hornbine Road in Rehoboth, Massachusetts. The central element of this farm complex is a 1 1/2-story wood-frame house built c. 1800, probably by Mial Pierce, a local militia captain in the American Revolutionary War, who is buried in a family plot on the property. The house is a Cape style cottage, which originally had a central chimney (removed during alterations c. 1850). There are two service ells dating to the 19th century. The complex includes a number of 19th century farm-related outbuildings.

The property was listed on the National Register of Historic Places in 1983.

== See also ==
- National Register of Historic Places listings in Bristol County, Massachusetts
