= Baker House (Alcester, South Dakota) =

Historic house in South Dakota, United States

- U.S. National Register of Historic Places
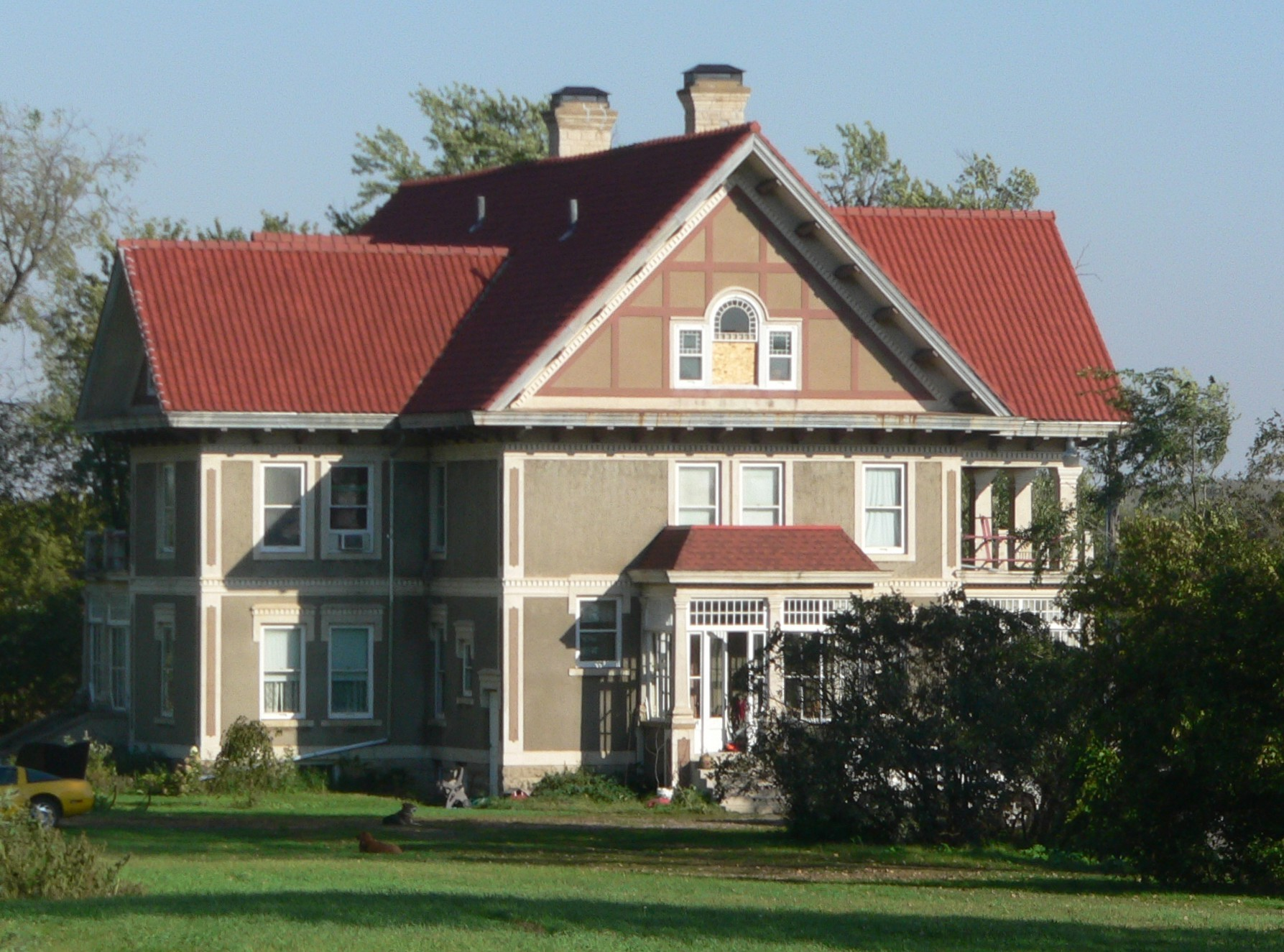
- The house in 2015

- Location within South Dakota Location within the United States
- Nearest city: Alcester, South Dakota
- Coordinates: 42°50′38″N 96°35′05″W
- Area: less than one acre
- Built: 1914
- Architect: G.W. Burkhead
- Architectural style: Neo-Classical Eclectic
- NRHP reference No.: 79002409
- Added to NRHP: August 7, 1979

The Baker House, located at 48113 SD Highway 48 near Alcester, South Dakota, was built in 1914. It was listed on the National Register of Historic Places in 1979. It is located on the South Dakota side of the Big Sioux River.

It was designed by Sioux City architect G.W. Burkhead, who also designed the NRHP-listed Mount Sinai Temple (Sioux City, Iowa).

The house is described as "a large two-and-one-half story "Neoclassical Eclectic"style country house. Classically symmetrical in design, the building features a projecting temple-like portico or porch. It has a red tiled roof, a cut stone foundation, and concrete walls marked in a wave design meant to resemble stucco from a distance. Neoclassical elements include the pediment extending over the front (south) porch, which is supported by four doric columns with square shafts, capitals, and bases. A palladian window occupies the tympanum of the pedements, which also feature horizontal and vertical strap work. Modillions and dentils run beneath the cornice and around the pediments."

It is significant as one of few vestiges of English settlers who emigrated to the Le Mars, Iowa area in the 1880s; "its English country style is found nowhere else in South Dakota. Because of its uniqueness of architectural style, it is a outstanding reminder of the English settlers, and for this reason it deserves nomination to the National Register."
