= Cullins-Baker House =

Historic house in North Carolina, United States

- U.S. National Register of Historic Places
- Location within North Carolina Location within the United States
- Location: NC 32, near Smalls Crossroads, North Carolina
- Coordinates: 36°17′41″N 76°39′1″W
- Area: 60 acres (24 ha)
- Built: c. 1838
- Architectural style: Greek Revival, Federal
- NRHP reference No.: 82003442
- Added to NRHP: April 29, 1982

Cullins-Baker House is a historic plantation house located near Smalls Crossroads, Chowan County, North Carolina. It was built in the late 1830s, and is a two-story, three-bay, transitional Federal / Greek Revival-style frame dwelling. It has a two-story rear ell and center-hall plan.

It was listed on the National Register of Historic Places in 1982.
