= Kenelum Baker House =

Historic house in Massachusetts, United States

- U.S. National Register of Historic Places
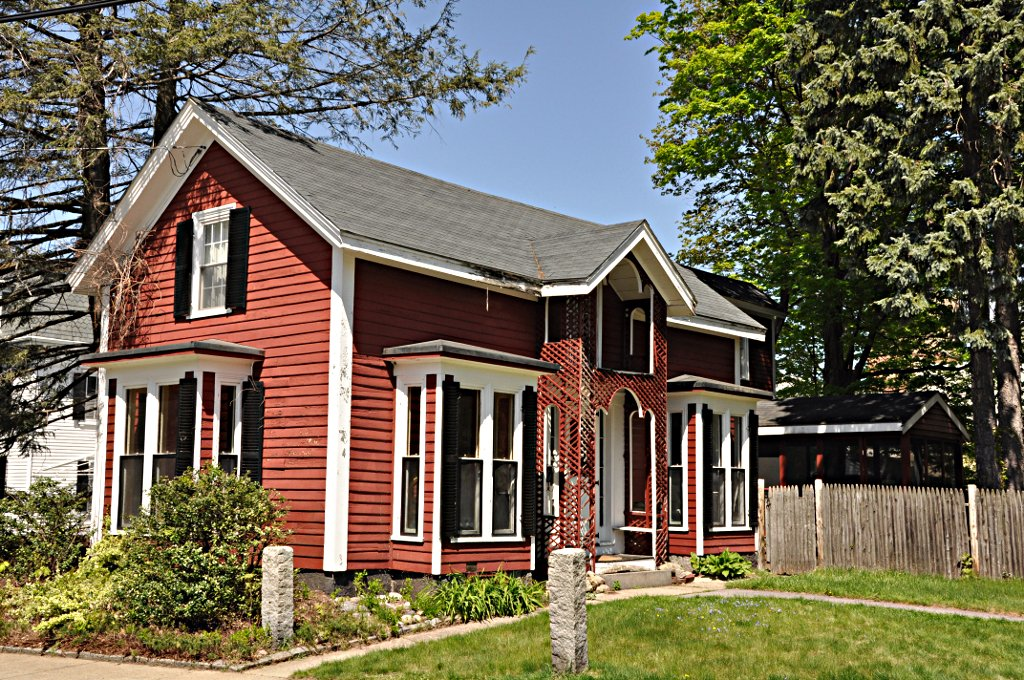

- Location within Massachusetts Location within the United States
- Location: 4 Norwood St., Winchester, Massachusetts
- Coordinates: 42°26′58″N 71°8′41″W
- Area: less than one acre
- Built: 1856
- Architect: Kenelum Baker
- Architectural style: Italianate
- MPS: Winchester MRA
- NRHP reference No.: 89000632
- Added to NRHP: July 5, 1989

The Kenelum Baker House is a historic house in Winchester, Massachusetts. Built in 1856 by a local master builder, it is a well-preserved example of vernacular Italianate styling. It was listed on the National Register of Historic Places in 1989.

== Description and history ==
The Kenelum Baker House stands in a residential area southwest of downtown Winchester, on the northeast side of Norwood Street opposite its junction with Lagrange Street. It is a 1 1/2-story wood-frame structure, oriented facing southeast, with a side-gable roof and clapboarded exterior. Its roof has a shallow pitch and a broad overhanging cornice. The center entry is flanked by rectangular window bays, and is framed by a portico with a projecting gable roof, beneath which are a pair of narrow round-arch windows. The walls of the projection consist of detailed latticework, with Palladian-style round-headed cutouts for the entry and window above. A projecting bay also appears on the side of the house, which faces the street.

This small house was built in 1856 by builder Kenelum Baker as his own home. Baker was locally prominent, overseeing construction of the town's 1857 Adams Street School (since demolished), and the Parker House, a particularly elaborate example of Italianate architecture. Later owners of this house include a local cemetery superintendent, and the first president of the Winchester Electric Light Company.

== See also ==
- National Register of Historic Places listings in Winchester, Massachusetts
