= Sebastian Baker Stone House =

Historic house in New York, United States

- U.S. National Register of Historic Places
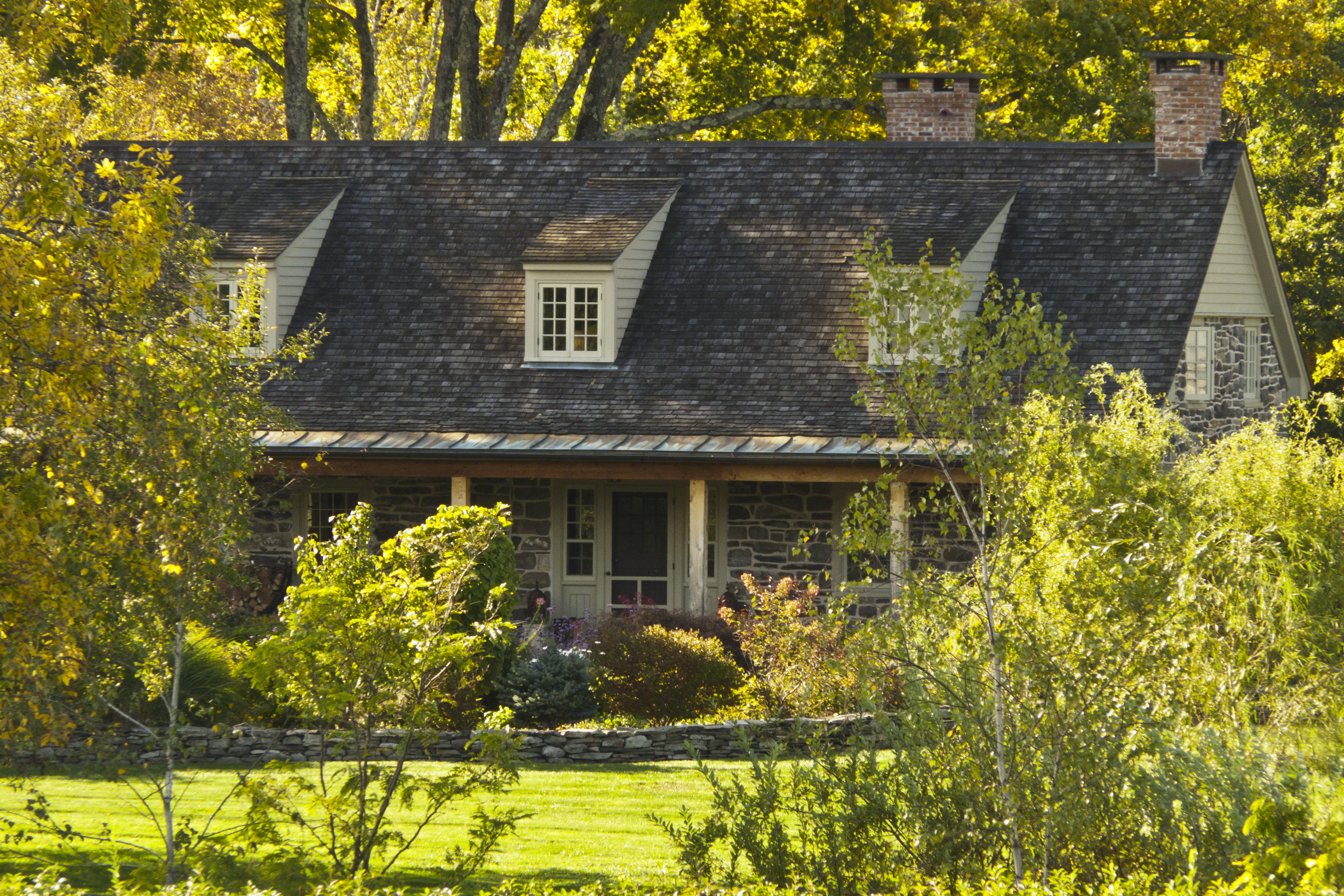

- Location within New York Location within the United States
- Location: 10 Dug Rd., Rochester, New York
- Coordinates: 41°49′55″N 74°14′40″W
- Area: 167 acres (68 ha)
- Built: 1790
- MPS: Rochester MPS
- NRHP reference No.: 96000136
- Added to NRHP: February 22, 1996

The Sebastian Baker Stone House is a historic house and farm complex located at 10 Dug Road in Rochester, Ulster County, New York.

== Description and history ==
It includes the house (c. 1790), Dutch barn (c. 1840), granary (c. 1840), horse barn (c. 1870), garage, shed, and privy (c. 1920). Also on the property is a well (c. 1790), family cemetery, house ruins, and sawmill ruins. The house is a 1 1/2-story, vernacular stone dwelling built upon a rectangular plan.

It was listed on the National Register of Historic Places on February 22, 1996.
