= Dixon, Wyoming =

- Town
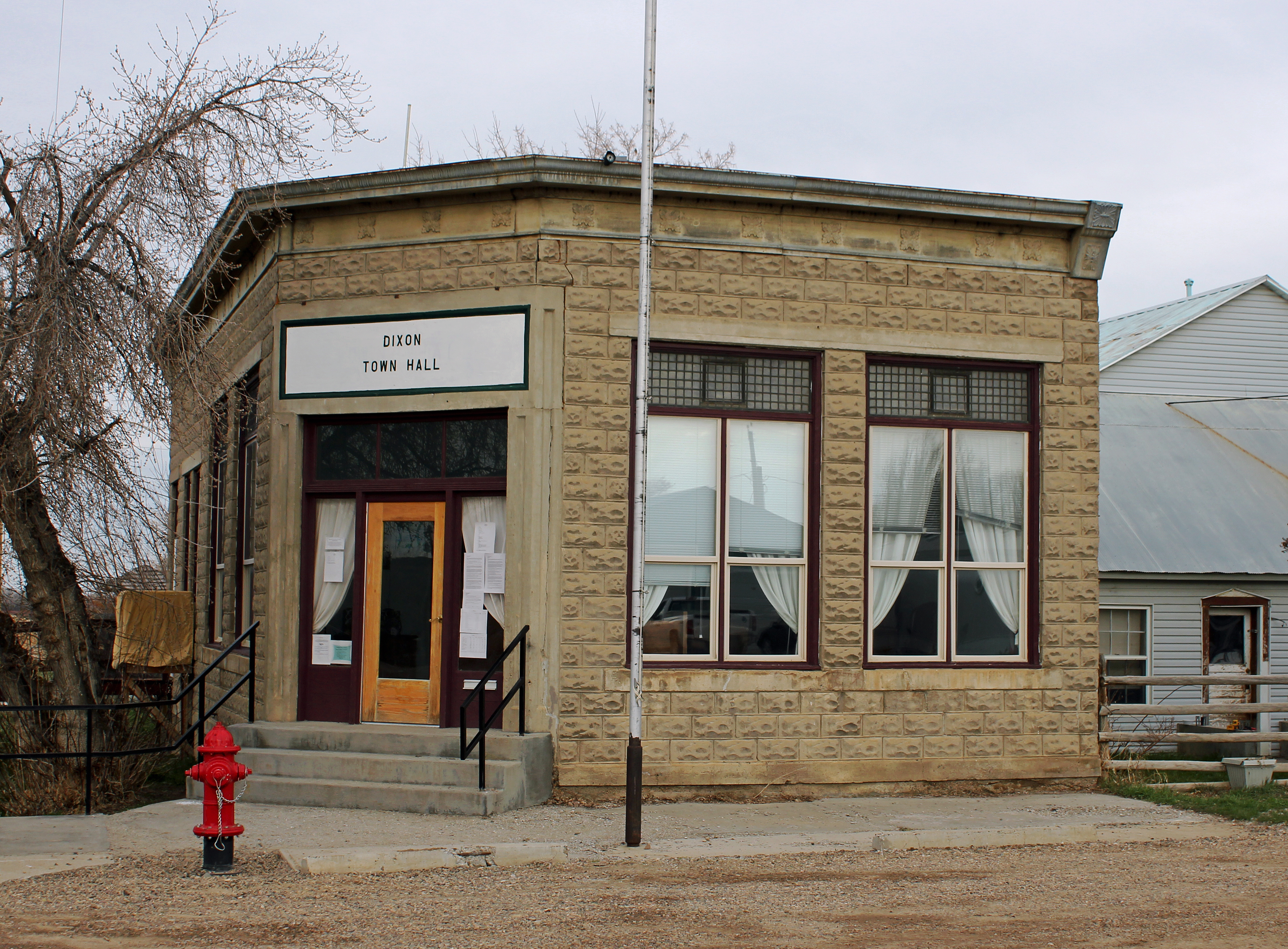
- The Dixon Town Hall, located at B Street and North 3rd Street.

- Location of Dixon in Carbon County, Wyoming.

- Location within Wyoming Location within the United States
- Coordinates: 41°02′04″N 107°32′08″W
- Country: United States
- State: Wyoming
- County: Carbon

Area
  - Total: 0.13 sq mi (0.34 km^{2})
  - Land: 0.13 sq mi (0.34 km^{2})
  - Water: 0 sq mi (0.00 km^{2})
- Elevation: 6,355 ft (1,937 m)

Population (2020)
  - Total: 74
  - Density: 715.8/sq mi (276.38/km^{2})
- Time zone: UTC-7 (Mountain (MST))
  - Summer (DST): UTC-6 (MDT)
- ZIP code: 82323
- Area code: 307
- GNIS feature ID: 2412435
- FIPS code: 56-20690
- Website: www.townofdixon.com

Dixon is a town in Carbon County, Wyoming, United States. As of the 2020 census, Dixon had a population of 74.

== History ==
The town claims an incorporation date of July 1887 though the Wyoming State Archives list 1917. An article in the January 11, 1912 Rawlins Republican also mentions a vote to incorporate the town.

Dixon is named for Bob Dixon, an early white trapper who came to the region along with Jim Baker.

The current town hall was built in 1911 as the Stockgrowers Bank.

The town once was the site of the county poor farm. The barn still stands though it is now on private property.

== Geography ==
Dixon is in the Little Snake River valley at the foothills of the Sierra Madre Range.

According to the United States Census Bureau, the town has a total area of 0.13 square miles (0.34 km^{2}), all land.

== Demographics ==
Historical population
Census	Pop.	Note	%±
1920	170		—
1930	145		−14.7%
1940	94		−35.2%
1950	124		31.9%
1960	108		−12.9%
1970	72		−33.3%
1980	82		13.9%
1990	70		−14.6%
2000	79		12.9%
2010	97		22.8%
2020	74		−23.7%
2025 (est.)	73	▼	−1.4%
U.S. Decennial Census

=== 2010 census ===
As of the census of 2010, there were 97 people, 43 households, and 27 families living in the town. The population density was 746.2 inhabitants per square mile (288.1/km^{2}). There were 64 housing units at an average density of 492.3 per square mile (190.1/km^{2}). The racial makeup of the town was 88.7% White, 3.1% African American, 1.0% Native American, 4.1% from other races, and 3.1% from two or more races. Hispanic or Latino of any race were 12.4% of the population.

There were 43 households, of which 30.2% had children under the age of 18 living with them, 46.5% were married couples living together, 2.3% had a female householder with no husband present, 14.0% had a male householder with no wife present, and 37.2% were non-families. 30.2% of all households were made up of individuals, and 4.7% had someone living alone who was 65 years of age or older. The average household size was 2.26 and the average family size was 2.70.

The median age in the town was 33.5 years. 21.6% of residents were under the age of 18; 9.4% were between the ages of 18 and 24; 30.9% were from 25 to 44; 25.8% were from 45 to 64; and 12.4% were 65 years of age or older. The gender makeup of the town was 56.7% male and 43.3% female.

=== 2000 census ===
As of the census of 2000, there were 79 people, 41 households, and 23 families living in the town. The population density was 584.1 people per square mile (217.9/km^{2}). There were 67 housing units at an average density of 495.4 per square mile (184.8/km^{2}). The racial makeup of the town was 96.20% White and 3.80% Native American. Hispanic or Latino of any race were 1.27% of the population.

There were 41 households, out of which 19.5% had children under the age of 18 living with them, 51.2% were married couples living together, 2.4% had a female householder with no husband present, and 43.9% were non-families. 39.0% of all households were made up of individuals, and 14.6% had someone living alone who was 65 years of age or older. The average household size was 1.93 and the average family size was 2.57.

In the town, the population was spread out, with 15.2% under the age of 18, 6.3% from 18 to 24, 29.1% from 25 to 44, 30.4% from 45 to 64, and 19.0% who were 65 years of age or older. The median age was 45 years. For every 100 females, there were 102.6 males. For every 100 females age 18 and over, there were 139.3 males.

The median income for a household in the town was $23,750, and the median income for a family was $37,500. Males had a median income of $35,417 versus $16,250 for females. The per capita income for the town was $15,950. There were no families and 8.0% of the population living below the poverty line, including no under eighteens and none of those over 64.

== Government ==
Dixon has a mayor and town council. There are four council members. Melodie Seilaff is mayor. Her term end December 2026.

== Arts and culture ==
The Little Snake River Valley Rodeo is held annually in the summer.

== Education ==
Public education in the town of Dixon is provided by Carbon County School District #1. Little Snake River Valley School, a K-12 campus, serves the town.

== See also ==
- List of municipalities in Wyoming
