= George Washington Baker House =

- U.S. National Register of Historic Places
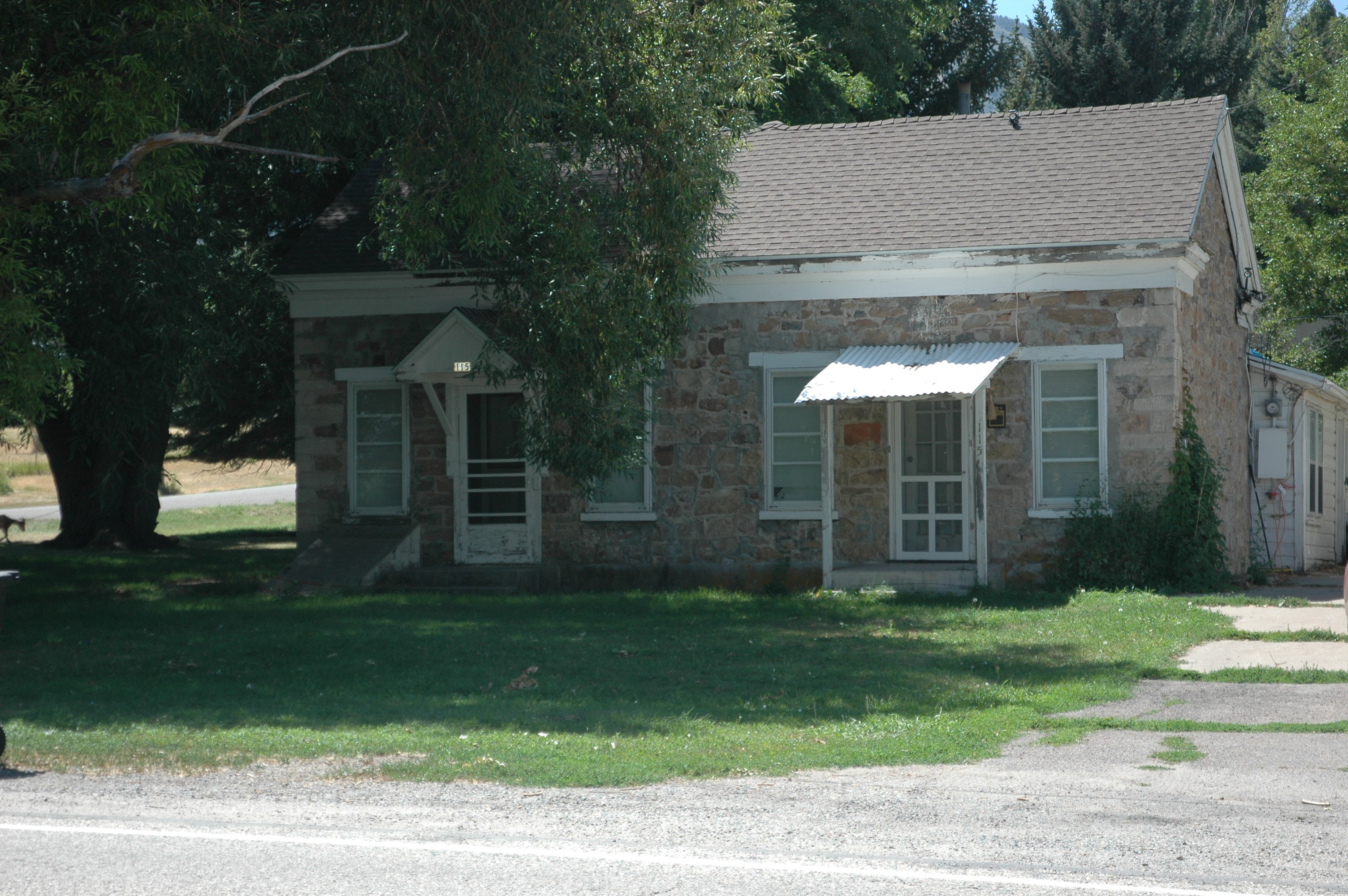

- Location within Utah
- Location: 115 N. 100 West, Mendon, Utah
- Coordinates: 41°42′37″N 111°58′44″W
- Area: less than one acre
- Built: 1869
- Architectural style: Double-Pen Type
- NRHP reference No.: 83004416
- Added to NRHP: February 10, 1983

The George Washington Baker House, at 115 N. 100 West in Mendon, Utah, was built in 1869. It was listed on the National Register of Historic Places in 1983.

It is a one-story stone building, originally with two roughly square rooms (about 15.3 by 14.3 feet (4.7 m × 4.4 m) and 14.6 by 14.3 feet (4.5 m × 4.4 m)). It has a six-bay facade with two front doors.

Its NRHP nomination describes it as having "Double-Pen Type" architecture, but this is perhaps not in the same sense that the term double pen architecture is used to describe early log homes in Kentucky and other states.
