= Henry W. Baker House =

Historic house in Michigan, United States

- U.S. National Register of Historic Places
- Michigan State Historic Site
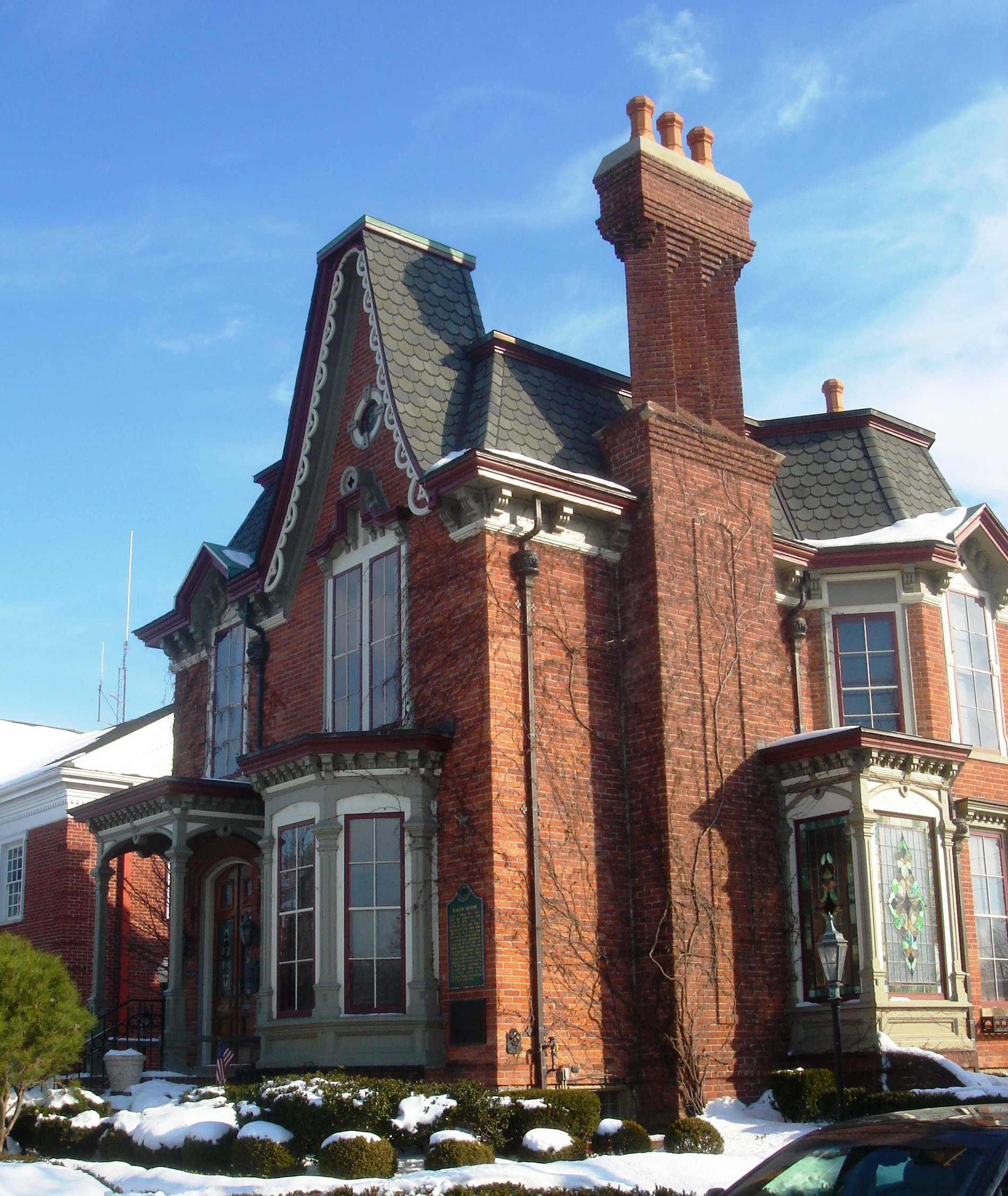
- Interactive map
- Location: 233 S. Main St., Plymouth, Michigan
- Coordinates: 42°22′19″N 83°28′3″W
- Built: 1875
- Architectural style: Italianate
- NRHP reference No.: 82002922

Significant dates
- Added to NRHP: April 22, 1982
- Designated MSHS: January 8, 1981

The Henry W. Baker House is located at 233 S. Main St. in Plymouth, Michigan. It was built by its original owner as a private home, but now houses commercial space. It was designated a Michigan State Historic Site in 1981 and listed on the National Register of Historic Places in 1982.

== Henry W. Baker ==
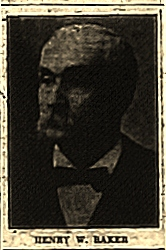
Pioneer Merchant of Plymouth Michigan

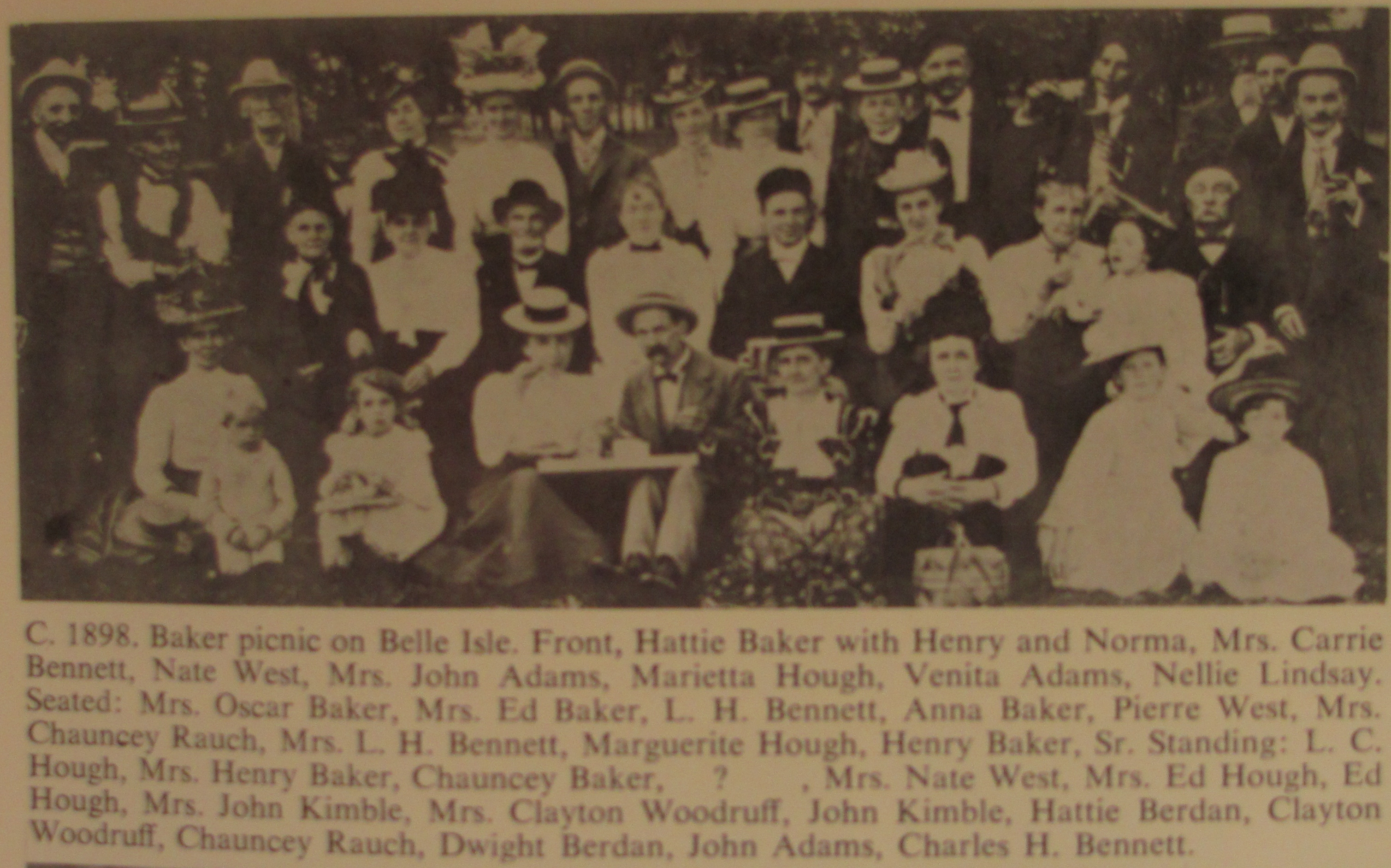
Baker Family at Belle Isle, 1898

Henry William Baker was born on February 10, 1833, in Richmond, Ontario County, New York. In 1842, his parents Samuel and Maria moved to Michigan, settling on a farm two-and-a-half miles west of Plymouth known as Cooper's Corners. Henry was the eldest of ten children; brothers Chauncey Elbridge, Oscar Nathaniel and Samuel Valentine, with sisters, Carolina Adelia Bennett, Janette "Nettie" Vrooman, Marietta "Mate" Hough, Frank Libby Adams, Anna Maria and Jennie L. Chadwick. H.W. Baker studied photography, and during the Civil War worked as a photographer in Ypsilanti, Michigan with his cousin, Edwin P. Baker. In 1866 he returned to Plymouth and entered into business. Mr. Baker was the Justice of the Peace for the Village of Plymouth in 1876. In 1882, he partnered with Mike Conner, Oscar A. Fraser, Calvin B. Crosby, Roswell Lincoln Root, S.J. Springer, David D. Allen, the Hon. Orlando R. Pattengell, brother-in-law, Lewis Cass Hough, J.P. Woodard, Theodore C. Sherwood, and inventor Clarence J. Hamilton, to found the Plymouth Iron Windmill Company, of which Baker was president in the years 1887–88. Manufacturing windmills was more or less successful, but in 1888 the company introduced the metal Daisy Air Rifle, which was also a Clarence Hamilton design, and moved prosperously away from the production of windmills. In 1895, the company changed its name to the Daisy Manufacturing Company, and built an immense business in the manufacture of air rifles. Henry W. Baker was president of the firm from 1895 till the time of his death, at which point his nephew, Charles H."Mr. Plymouth" Bennett, took control of the firm. In 1904, Mr. Baker, joined by his sister Caroline Bennett, along with his business partners within the Daisy firm took the initial stock offering of the Ford Motor Company of Canada.

Baker was married twice: first to Flora Bromsfield, then to Angeline C. Myers. His house was contemporaneously described as "a beautiful home; a costly brick structure." H.W. Baker died at his home, Monday November 24, 1919.

== Description ==
The Henry W. Baker House is a two-story structure constructed from brick. The house is of a fanciful Italianate design, likely based on an illustration in a pattern book. The house was a landmark in Plymouth because of the unusual tower, shaped like a pagoda, atop the mansard roof. The house is asymmetrical in plan, with a cut stone foundation and a kitchen wing in the rear, extended by later additions of a carriage shed and cement block garage. The main section of the house is articulated with bay windows and porches, and gables on the upper story, most noticeable on the front facade. The entrance has arch-top double doors under a small porch; over that is a window with a gabled pediment.

== The Henry W. Baker House history ==
Henry W. Baker built his house in 1875, and lived there until his death in 1919. His sister Anna lived in the home until 1943, at which time the pagoda tower was removed from the house during a renovation. The structure was converted to commercial use in the 1970s and neglected. The building was later restored, including the pagoda, and now houses a law practice. A state of Michigan historic marker is placed in front of the house, which incorrectly states that he died in the year 1920. The building is now owned by Susan Rogal and is home to VITRINE Boutique, a Lifestyle Store, one of the most unique shops in the region.
