= C.H. Baker Double House =

Historic house in Iowa, United States

- U.S. National Register of Historic Places
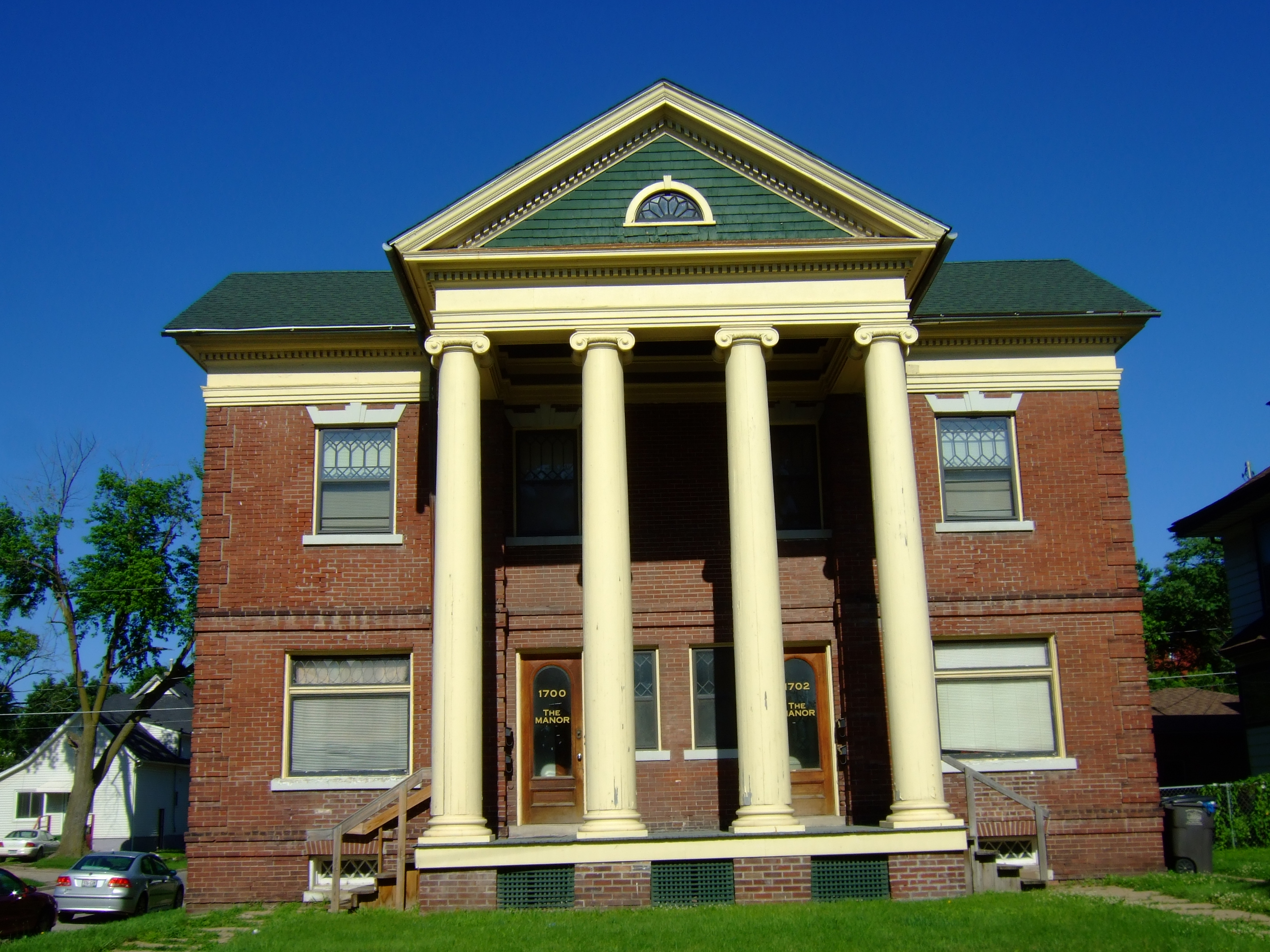

- Location within Iowa Location within the United States
- Location: 1700-1702 6th Ave. Des Moines, Iowa
- Coordinates: 41°36′32.7″N 93°37′33.9″W
- Area: less than one acre
- Built: 1902
- Architect: Smith & Gutterson
- Architectural style: Colonial Revival
- MPS: Towards a Greater Des Moines MPS
- NRHP reference No.: 96001153
- Added to NRHP: October 25, 1996

The C.H. Baker Double House, also known as the Indiana Apartments, The Manor, and The Manor House, is an historic building located in Des Moines, Iowa, United States. Built from 1901 to 1902, it is a two-story structure that features balloon frame construction with brick veneer. It was designed in the Colonial Revival style by the Des Moines architectural firm of Smith & Gutterson. Its significance is attributed to its location on the Sixth Avenue streetcar route "to capitalize on the appeal of public transportation." It was one of the first multiple-family rental properties along the avenue, and it was built for upper-middle class occupancy. It was part of the movement toward denser residential use in this area of the city. The house was listed on the National Register of Historic Places in 1996.
