= W. C. Baker House =

Historic house in Oklahoma, United States

- U.S. National Register of Historic Places
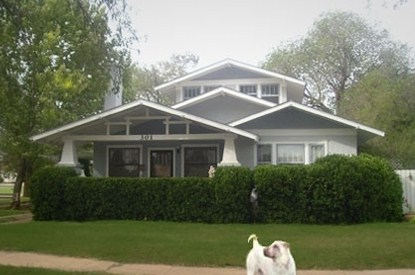

- Location within Oklahoma Location within the United States
- Location: 301 E. Commerce, Altus, Oklahoma
- Coordinates: 34°38′21″N 99°19′50″W
- Area: less than one acre
- Built: 1917
- Architectural style: Airplane bungalow
- NRHP reference No.: 05001417
- Added to NRHP: December 16, 2005

The W. C. Baker House is an airplane bungalow located at 301 E. Commerce in the city of Altus, Oklahoma. The house was built in 1917 for the sister of William Clarence Baker; however, Baker bought the house shortly afterward. Baker owned a local machine shop and cotton gin, and he served on Altus' original city council. The house has a typical airplane bungalow plan with a small second story above a low, multi-component first-floor roof, a design reminiscent of an airplane's cockpit. The house's design also includes many characteristic features of the Craftsman style, including overhanging eaves and exposed rafter tails. The porch features battered columns supporting its roof and decorative stickwork in its gable, both of which are typical Craftsman elements.

The house was added to the National Register of Historic Places on December 16, 2005.
