= House at 197 Hornbine Road =

Historic house in Massachusetts, United States

- U.S. National Register of Historic Places
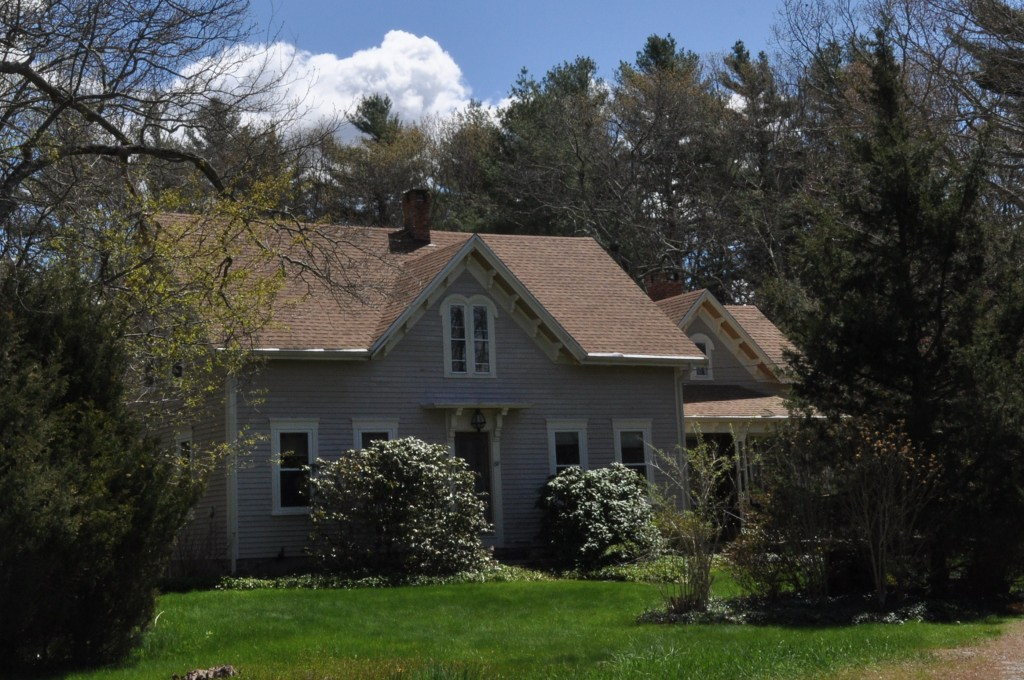

- Location within Massachusetts Location within the United States
- Location: 197 Hornbine Rd., Rehoboth, Massachusetts
- Coordinates: 41°47′28″N 71°12′2″W
- Area: 2 acres (0.81 ha)
- Built: c. 1890
- Architectural style: Late Victorian
- MPS: Rehoboth MRA
- NRHP reference No.: 83000681
- Added to NRHP: June 6, 1983

The House at 197 Hornbine Road in Rehoboth, Massachusetts, is the town's finest example of 19th-century Italianate style.

== Description and history ==
The 1 1/2-story, wood-framed house was built in about 1890 by a member of the locally prominent Baker family. It has bracketed eaves and round-arch windows in the front-facing gables, all characteristic of the style, and it retains much of its interior period detail. The front door is original, as is the bracketed hood that shelters it. As of 2017, the twelve-room house is valued at about $338,000.

The house was built listed on the National Register of Historic Places on June 6, 1983.

== See also ==
- National Register of Historic Places listings in Bristol County, Massachusetts
