= Bressmer-Baker House =

Historic house in Illinois, United States

- U.S. National Register of Historic Places
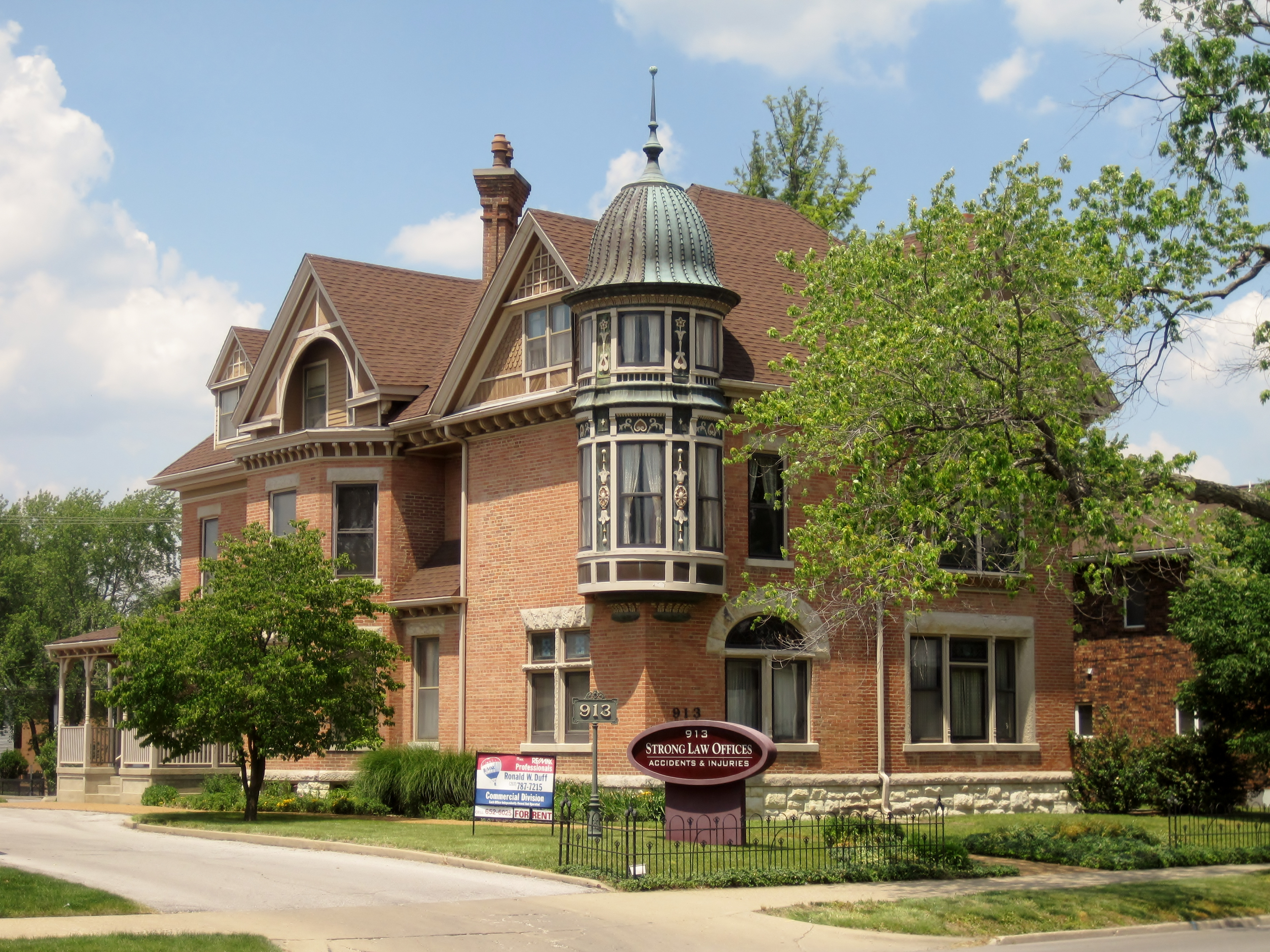

- Location within Illinois Location within the United States
- Interactive map showing the location of Bressmer-Baker House
- Location: 913 6th St., Springfield, Illinois
- Coordinates: 39°47′32.17″N 89°38′54.49″W
- Area: 0.5 acres (0.20 ha)
- Built: 1853
- Architect: Dennis, Thomas; Shinn, Charles Wesley
- Architectural style: Queen Anne
- NRHP reference No.: 82002599
- Added to NRHP: June 29, 1982

The Bressmer-Baker House is a historic house located at 913 6th Street in Springfield, Illinois. Hiram Walker built the original house in 1853. Two years later, Walker sold the house to merchant John Bressmer, who commissioned architect Thomas Dennis to redesign it. After several changes in ownership, businessman William B. Baker purchased the house in 1889. Baker hired Charles Wesley Shinn to once again redesign the house; Shinn's Queen Anne design has survived through the present day. Shinn added the copper-domed turret which projects from the southeast corner of the house; the turret is the only one of its kind in Springfield. Other significant features of Shinn's design include the irregular plan, the assortment of exterior materials, the varied gables, and the tall chimneys.

The house was added to the National Register of Historic Places on June 29, 1982. After having been used for law offices, it alongside surrounding properties are currently used as short-term rentals under the name The Bressmer.
