= Fuller-Baker Log House =

Historic house in Maryland, United States

- U.S. National Register of Historic Places
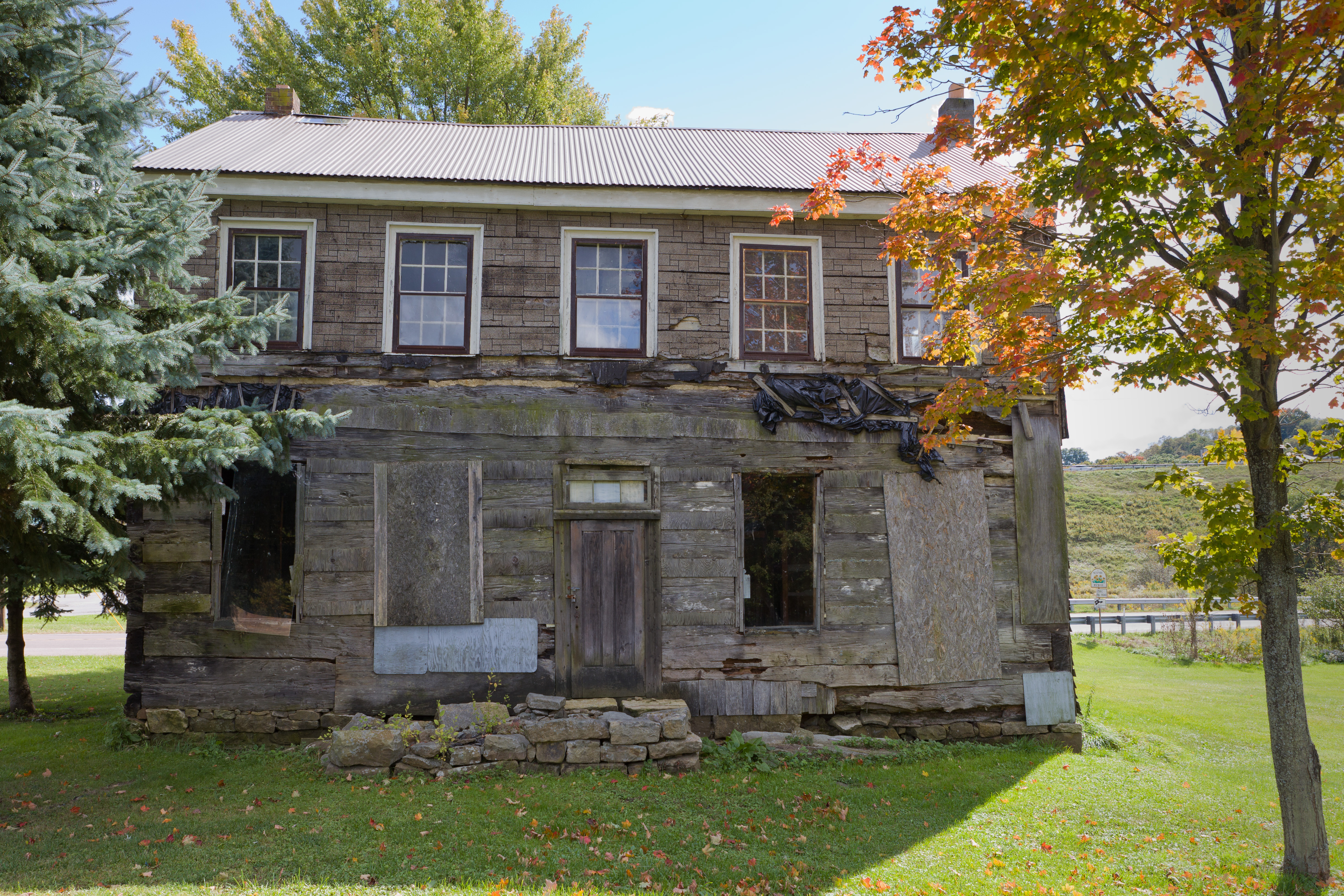

- Location within Maryland Location within the United States
- Nearest city: Grantsville, Maryland
- Coordinates: 39°41′45″N 79°10′20″W
- NRHP reference No.: 71000375
- Added to NRHP: February 12, 1971

The Fuller-Baker Log House is a historic home located at Grantsville, Garrett County, Maryland, United States. It is a two-story rectangular log home, constructed of log planks about 8 inches (20 cm) thick; some are 14 to 16 inches (36–41 cm) broad and a few are 26 feet (8 m) long. The house has been restored as an artist's studio and is an example of a log dwelling once common on the Allegheny frontier. Maryland's first governor, Thomas Johnson, owned the property when the house was built in 1815, but it is named for two later residents.

The Fuller-Baker Log House was listed on the National Register of Historic Places in 1971.
