= Peter Baker Three-Decker =

- U.S. National Register of Historic Places
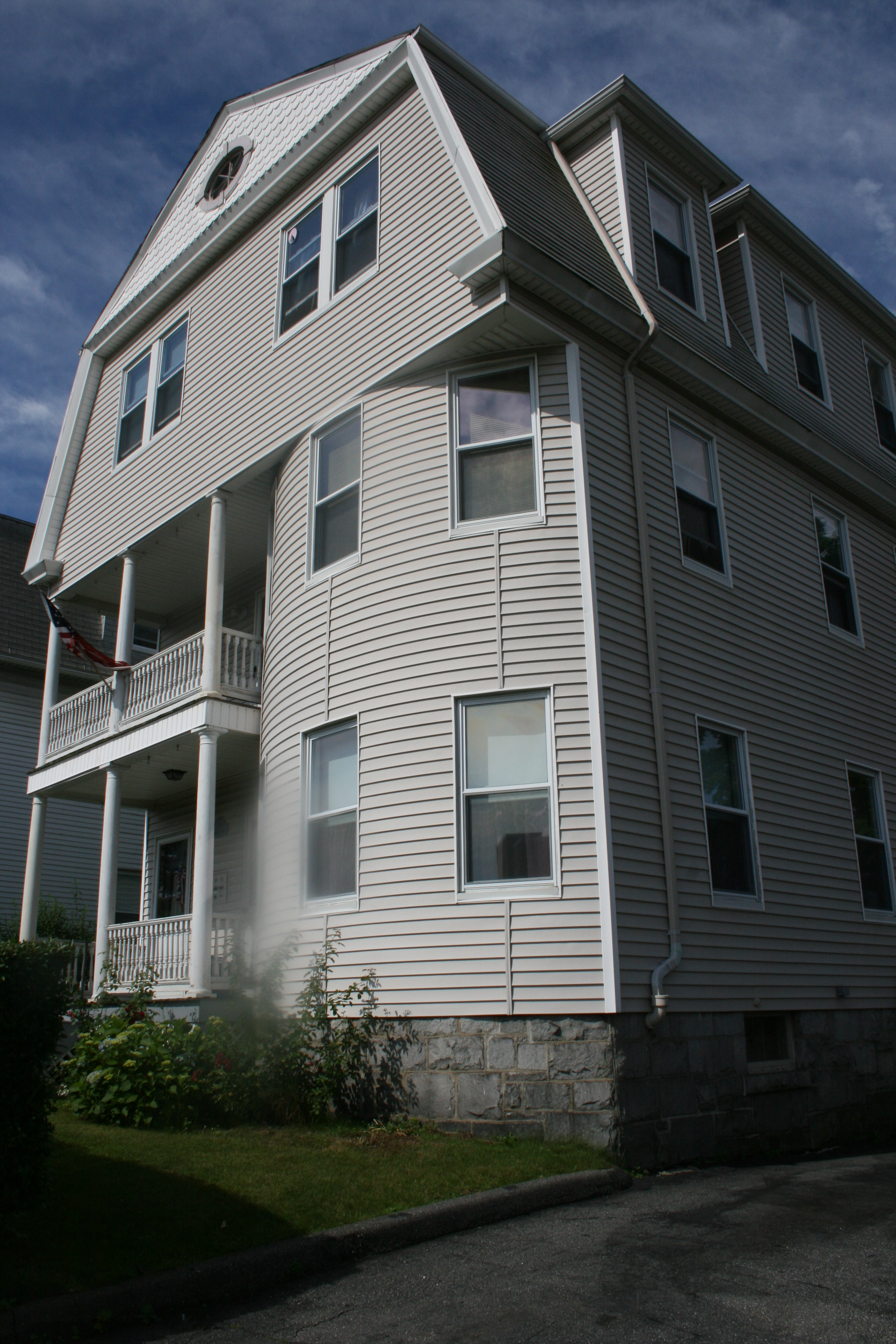

- Location within Massachusetts Location within the United States
- Location: 90 Vernon St., Worcester, Massachusetts
- Coordinates: 42°14′53″N 71°47′44″W
- Area: less than one acre
- Built: 1902
- Architectural style: Colonial Revival
- MPS: Worcester Three-Deckers TR
- NRHP reference No.: 89002445
- Added to NRHP: February 9, 1990

The Peter Baker Three-Decker is a historic triple decker in Worcester, Massachusetts. Built c. 1902, it is a well-preserved example of a gambrel-roofed Colonial Revival three-decker, and an early example of this style in the neighborhood. It was listed on the National Register of Historic Places in 1990.

== Description and history ==
The Peter Baker Three-Decker stands in a residential area on Worcester's south east side, at the southwest corner of Vernon and Alpine Streets. It is three stories in height, and of wood-frame construction with a largely vinyl-clad exterior. It is covered by a gambrel roof, with an area of decorative wooden shingles and an oculus window near the gable top. The right side of the front facade has a rounded bay set beneath the main roof, with a two-story porch on the left side. The ground floor porch columns are round, while those on the second floor have been replaced by modern square posts. The third floor facade, set between the steep portions of the gambrel, has two sets of paired sash windows.

The building was built about 1902 as part of a wave of speculative development on the city's east side. It was built by Peter Baker, owner of a local manufacturing company, as well as numerous other nearby properties. The building's early tenants had working-class occupations, including chauffeur, clerk, polisher, fireman, and machinist. Its gambrel roof is one of the earliest surviving examples of its type in the neighborhood, where a significant number of them were built later.

== See also ==
- National Register of Historic Places listings in eastern Worcester, Massachusetts
