= Millhiser-Baker Farm =

- U.S. National Register of Historic Places
- Location within New Mexico
- Nearest city: Roswell, New Mexico
- Coordinates: 33°22′26″N 104°33′04″W
- Area: less than one acre
- Built: c.1893
- Architectural style: Queen Anne
- MPS: Roswell New Mexico MRA
- NRHP reference No.: 85003638
- Added to NRHP: August 29, 1988

The Millhiser-Baker Farm, in Chaves County, New Mexico near Roswell, New Mexico, was listed on the National Register of Historic Places in 1988.

Gus A. Millhiser of Richmond, Virginia bought the farm in 1893 for his son, Philip, who had tuberculosis. Its Queen Anne house was built soon after.

It is located on Route 1 about 0.5 miles (0.80 km) south of McGaffey, New Mexico.
