= James V. and Sophia Baker House =

Historic house in Idaho, United States

- U.S. National Register of Historic Places
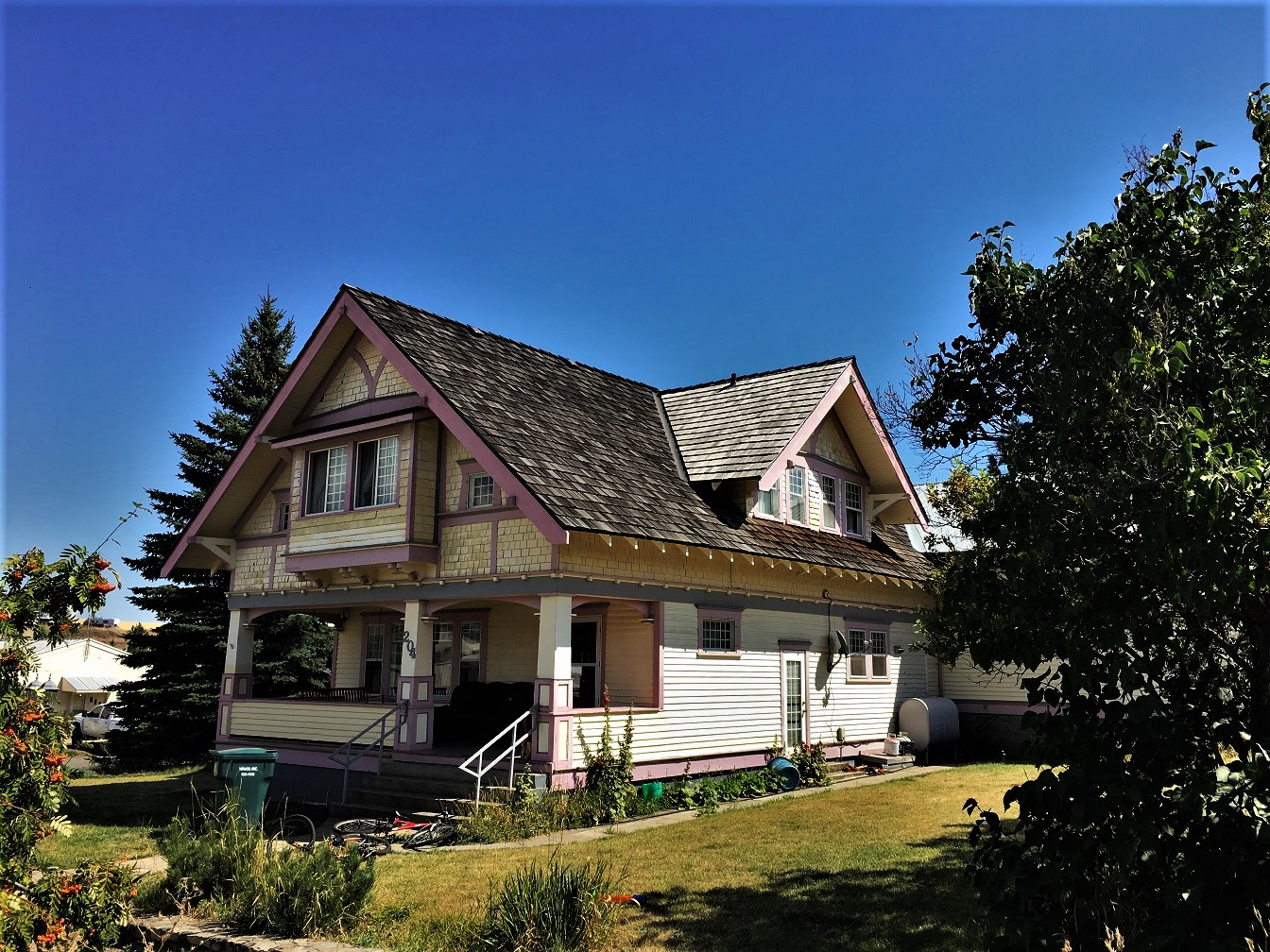

- Location within Idaho Location within the United States
- Location: 204 Broadway St. Cottonwood, Idaho
- Coordinates: 46°02′51″N 116°21′04″W
- Area: less than one acre
- Built: 1916
- Built by: Rieland, John
- Architectural style: American Craftsman
- NRHP reference No.: 03001366
- Added to NRHP: January 6, 2004

The James V. and Sophia Baker House is a historic home located at 204 Broadway St. in Cottonwood, Idaho. The American Craftsman style house was constructed in 1916. The house's design features tapered columns on its front porch, exposed rafters and open eaves, and fake braces which appear to support the roof's gables. James V. Baker, the home's original owner, was a farmer and wagon driver who migrated to the Northwest from Illinois; he lived in Cottonwood for several years in the early 1900s, briefly left, and commissioned the home after his return in 1915.

The house was added to the National Register of Historic Places on January 6, 2004.
