= James Baker House (Burkesville, Kentucky) =

Historic house in Kentucky, United States

- U.S. National Register of Historic Places
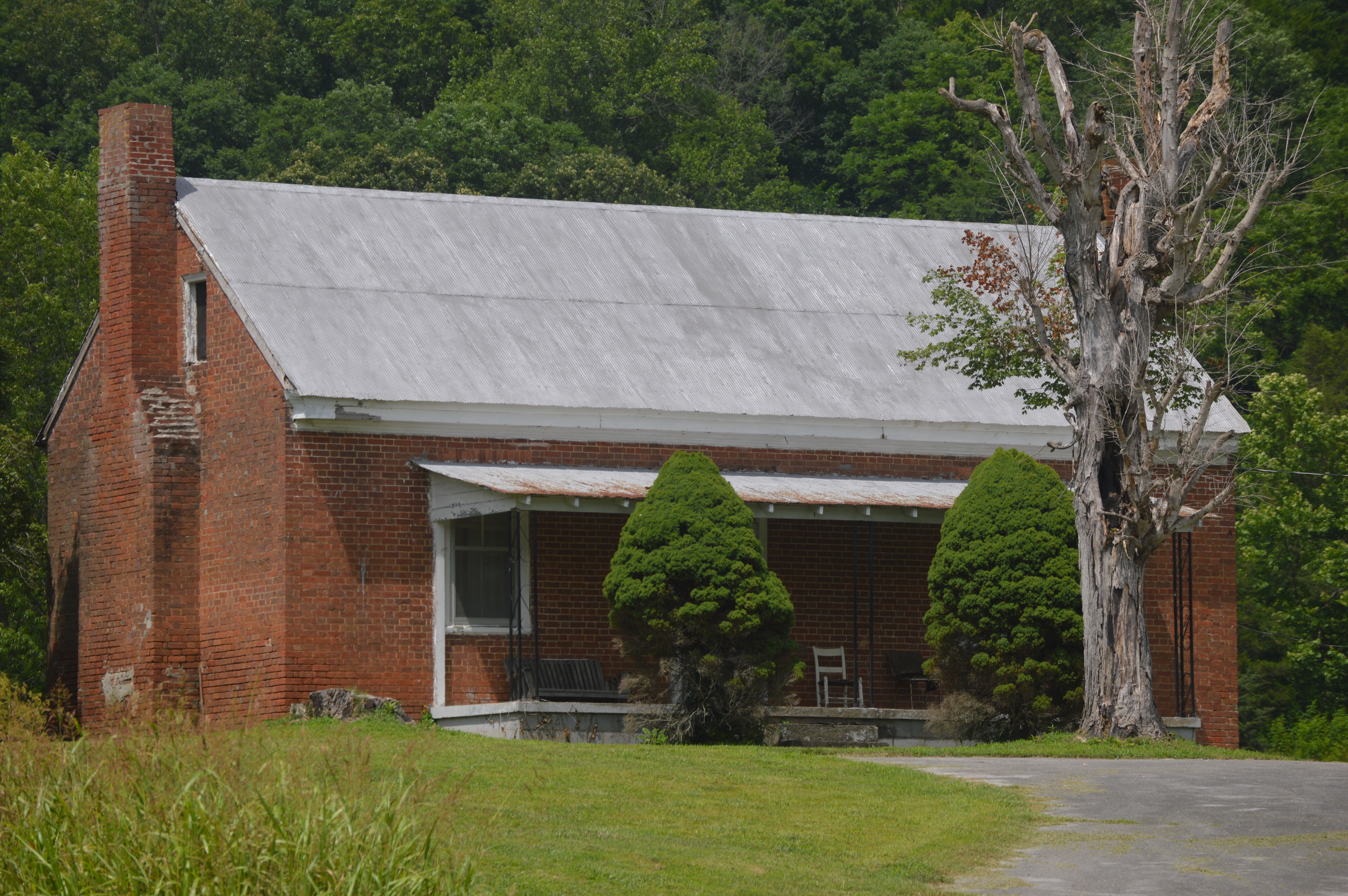

- Location within Kentucky Location within the United States
- Location: On Kentucky Route 61 north of Burkesville, Kentucky
- Coordinates: 36°51′33″N 85°22′36″W
- Area: less than one acre
- Built: 1820
- Built by: Baker, Obediah
- Architectural style: Federal
- NRHP reference No.: 06000212
- Added to NRHP: April 5, 2006

The James Baker House near Burkesville, Kentucky is a Federal-style building built in 1820. It was listed on the National Register of Historic Places in 2006.

It is located on Kentucky Route 61.

The house was deemed notable for its "demonstrating how Virginia served as a source area for architectural ideas in this part of Kentucky, which was still being settled in 1820, the year of the house's construction. This house is typical of mid-18th-century Virginia vernacular housing, and gives insight to the continued influence of the English settlements on the pioneers relocating to the West. The Flemish bond exterior and the elaborate detail of the Federal style interior were found in Kentucky's highly designed homes in 1820. This house may have been an effort by wealthy rural residents to convey their social status through fashionable architectural style, while at the same time retaining a traditional hall and parlor plan that was deemed serviceable for that period. The design reveals how 18th-century Virginia spatial design and exterior treatments have served well into 20 -, and now 21 -century Kentucky."
