= James B. Baker House =

Historic house in Maryland, United States

- U.S. National Register of Historic Places
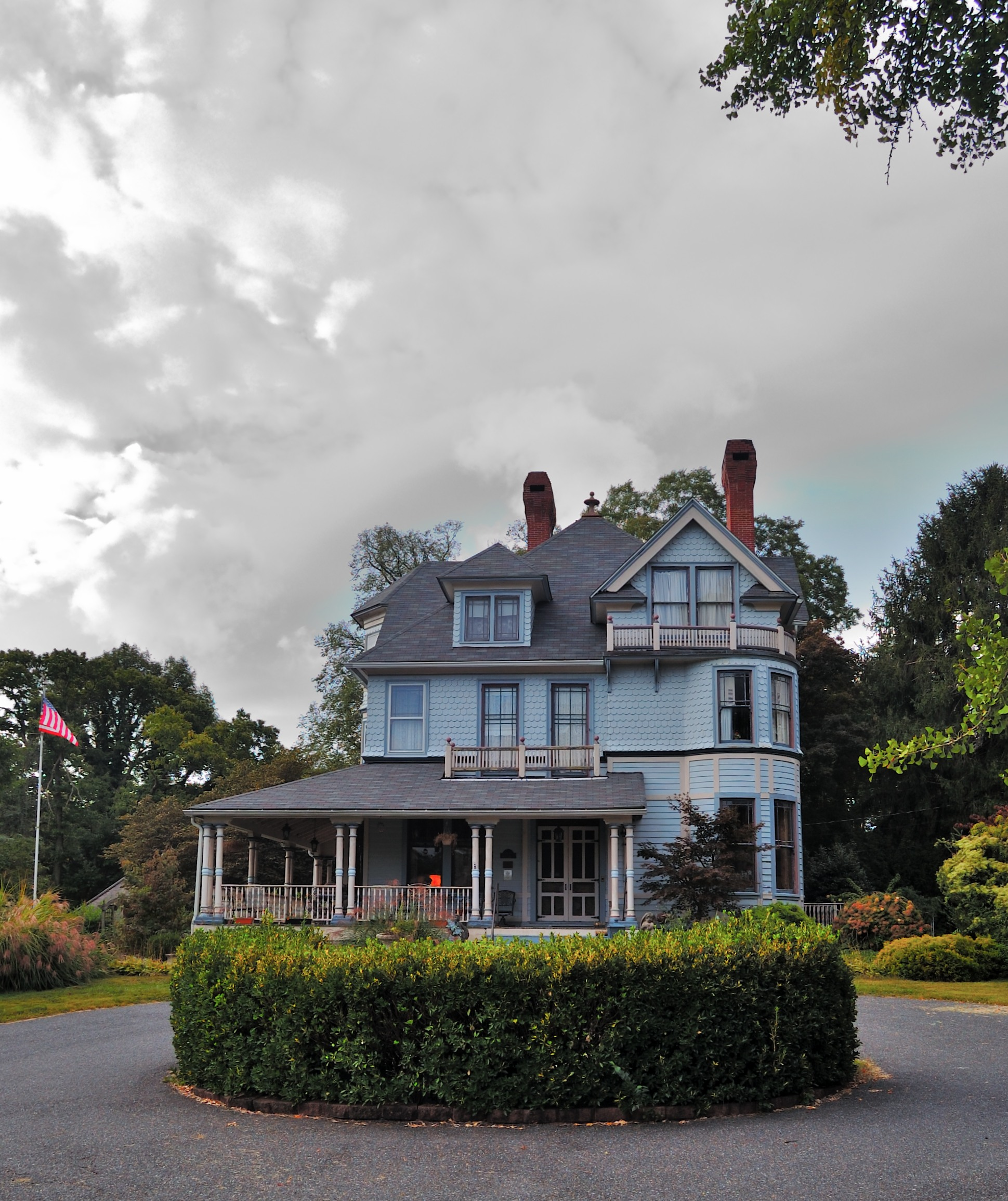
- Baker House in 2013

- Location within Maryland Location within the United States
- Location: 452 W. Bel Air Ave., Aberdeen, Maryland
- Coordinates: 39°30′45″N 76°10′25″W
- Area: 1.6 acres (0.65 ha)
- Built: 1896
- Architectural style: Queen Anne
- NRHP reference No.: 82001593
- Added to NRHP: December 10, 1982

James B. Baker House is a historic home located at Aberdeen, Harford County, Maryland. It is a large three-story frame residence constructed in 1896 in the Queen Anne style. It features multiple gables, projections, dormers, and balconies enlivening its essentially square form and high hipped roof. James B. Baker was a leading entrepreneur in the canning industry.

It was listed on the National Register of Historic Places in 1982.
