= Samuel Baker House (Elfers, Florida) =

Historic house in Florida, United States

- U.S. National Register of Historic Places
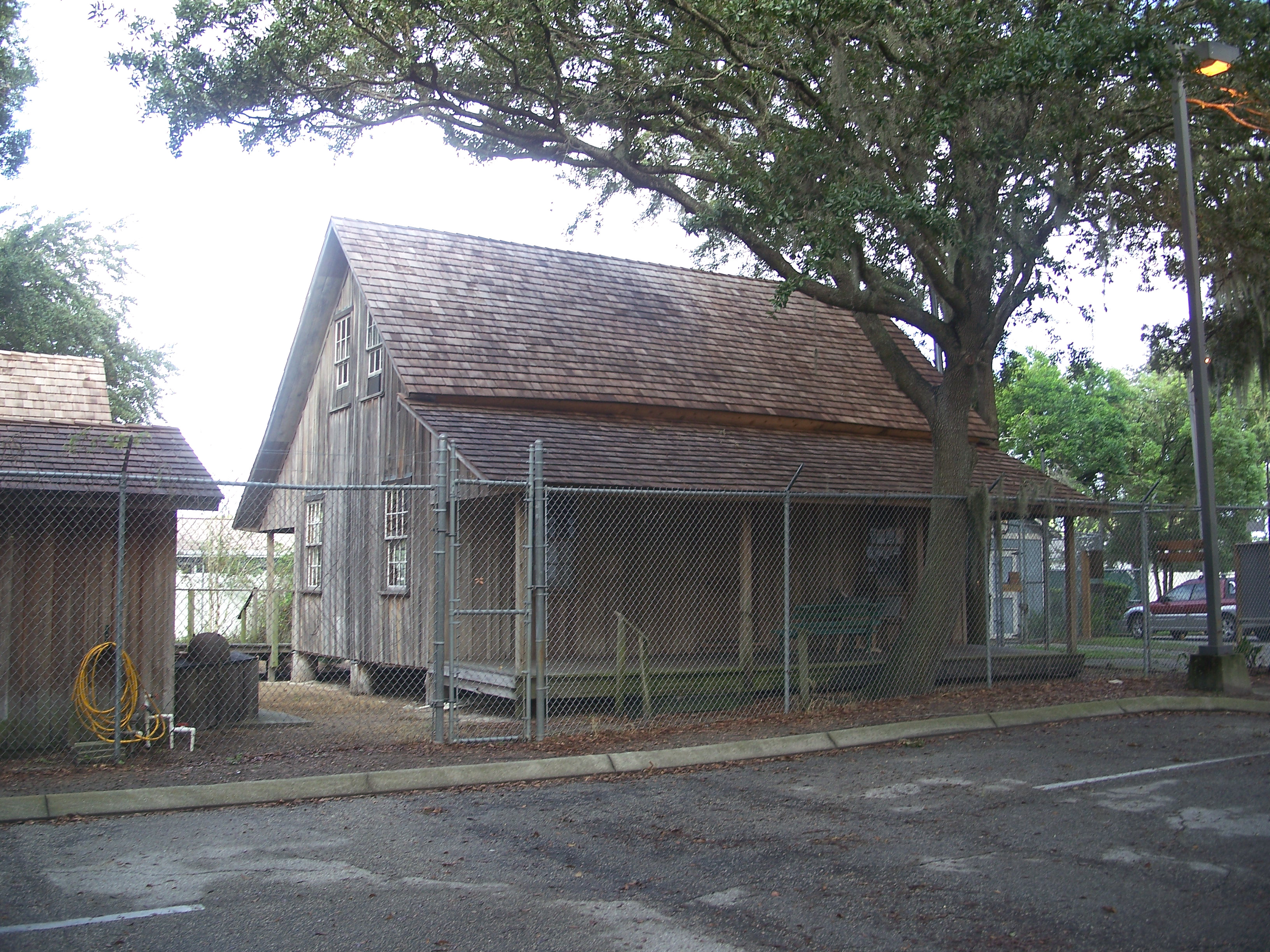

- Location within Florida
- Interactive map showing the location of Samuel Baker House
- Location: Elfers, Florida
- Coordinates: 28°12′31″N 82°43′11″W
- Built: 1882
- Architectural style: Frame Vernacular
- NRHP reference No.: 97000052
- Added to NRHP: February 14, 1997

The Samuel Baker House is an historic site in Elfers, Florida. It was built in 1882, and is located at 5742 Moog Road. On February 14, 1997, it was added to the National Register of Historic Places.
