= Jim Baker Cabin =

- Baker, Jim, Cabin
- U.S. National Register of Historic Places
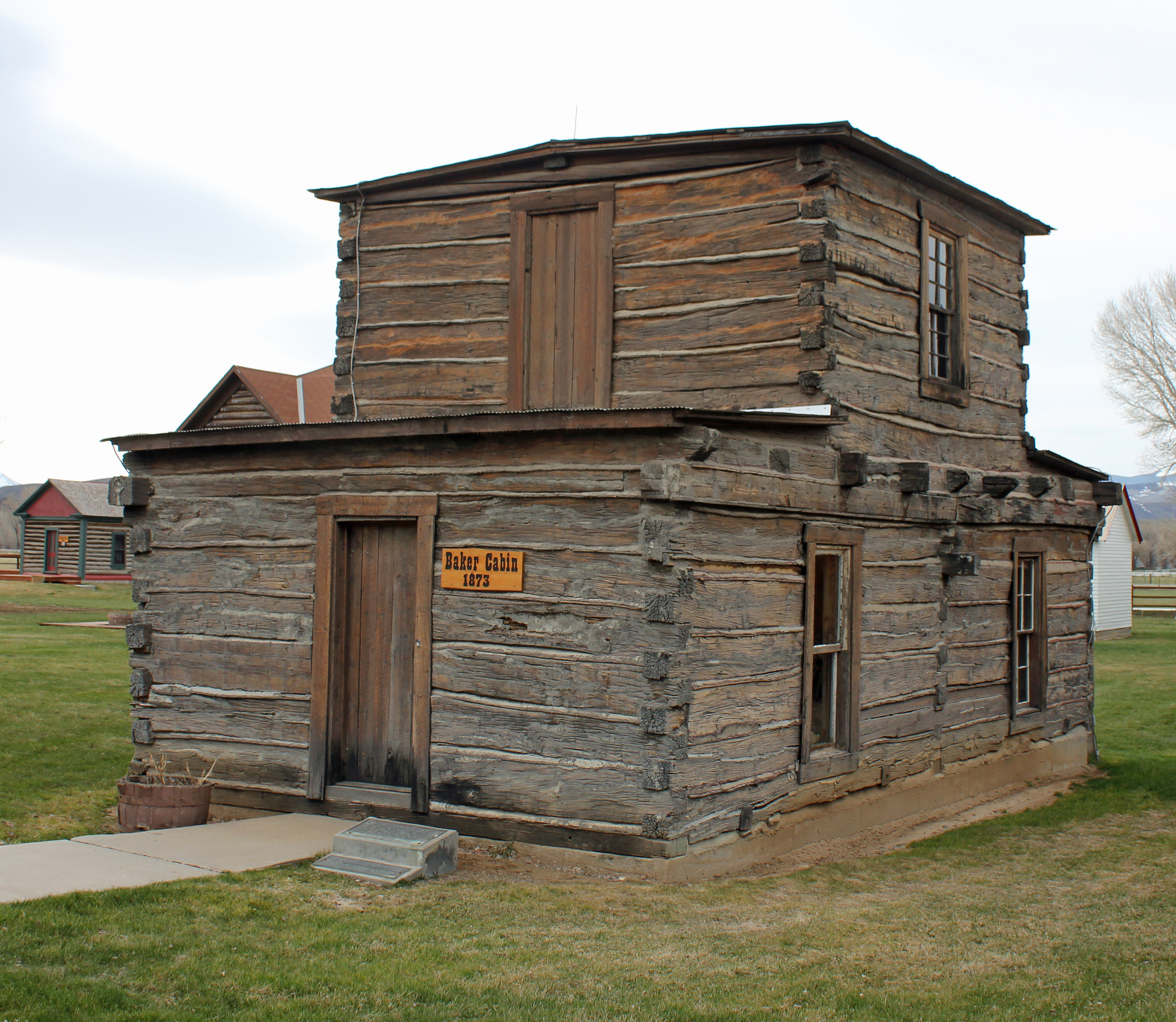
- Jim Baker Cabin in 2014

- Location within Wyoming Location within the United States
- Location: Off WY 70, Savery, Wyoming
- Coordinates: 41°1′36″N 107°26′57″W
- Area: less than one acre
- Built: 1873
- Built by: Jim Baker
- Architectural style: Log Cabin
- NRHP reference No.: 82001830
- Added to NRHP: November 8, 1982

The Jim Baker Cabin was built in 1873 by frontiersman Jim Baker as a fortified house on the Little Snake River at Savery Creek near present-day Savery, Wyoming. The two-story log building measures 31 feet (9.4 m) by 16 feet (4.9 m) with two rooms on the lower level and a single smaller room on the upper level. The outer walls are made of logs 12 inches (30 cm) to 15 inches (38 cm) thick.

== History ==
Jim Baker was recruited by the American Fur Company in 1839 for an 18-month expedition with Jim Bridger to Wyoming. Baker returned briefly to his home in Illinois in 1841 but returned to the Rocky Mountains with the Bidwell-Bartleson party, where he joined a trapping party on the Little Snake River. The party of 23 fought with about 500 Arapahos, Cheyenne and Sioux on August 21, 1841, losing three of their party and claiming 100 Native American casualties. Following the fight the trapping party retreated to Bridger's camp on the Green River. Baker stayed in the west as a trapper until 1852, when he went on a trip with Kit Carson. He also served as an interpreter and scout. He was one of the first permanent residents in the area of Denver, Colorado, nominally living there from 1859 to 1871, although the residence was primarily inhabited by Baker's wife and family while he traveled. In 1873 Baker and his family moved to the Little Snake valley in Wyoming, where he remained until his death on May 15, 1898.

== Preservation ==
In 1917 interest in preserving the cabin resulted in its purchase by the state of Wyoming, in part to prevent its removal to Denver for display. It was dismantled and moved to Frontier Park in Cheyenne. In 1973 the cabin was moved again to a location close to its original site in Savery.

The Baker Cabin was placed on the National Register of Historic Places on November 8, 1982.
