= J. and E. Baker Cobblestone Farmstead =

Historic house in New York, United States

- U.S. National Register of Historic Places
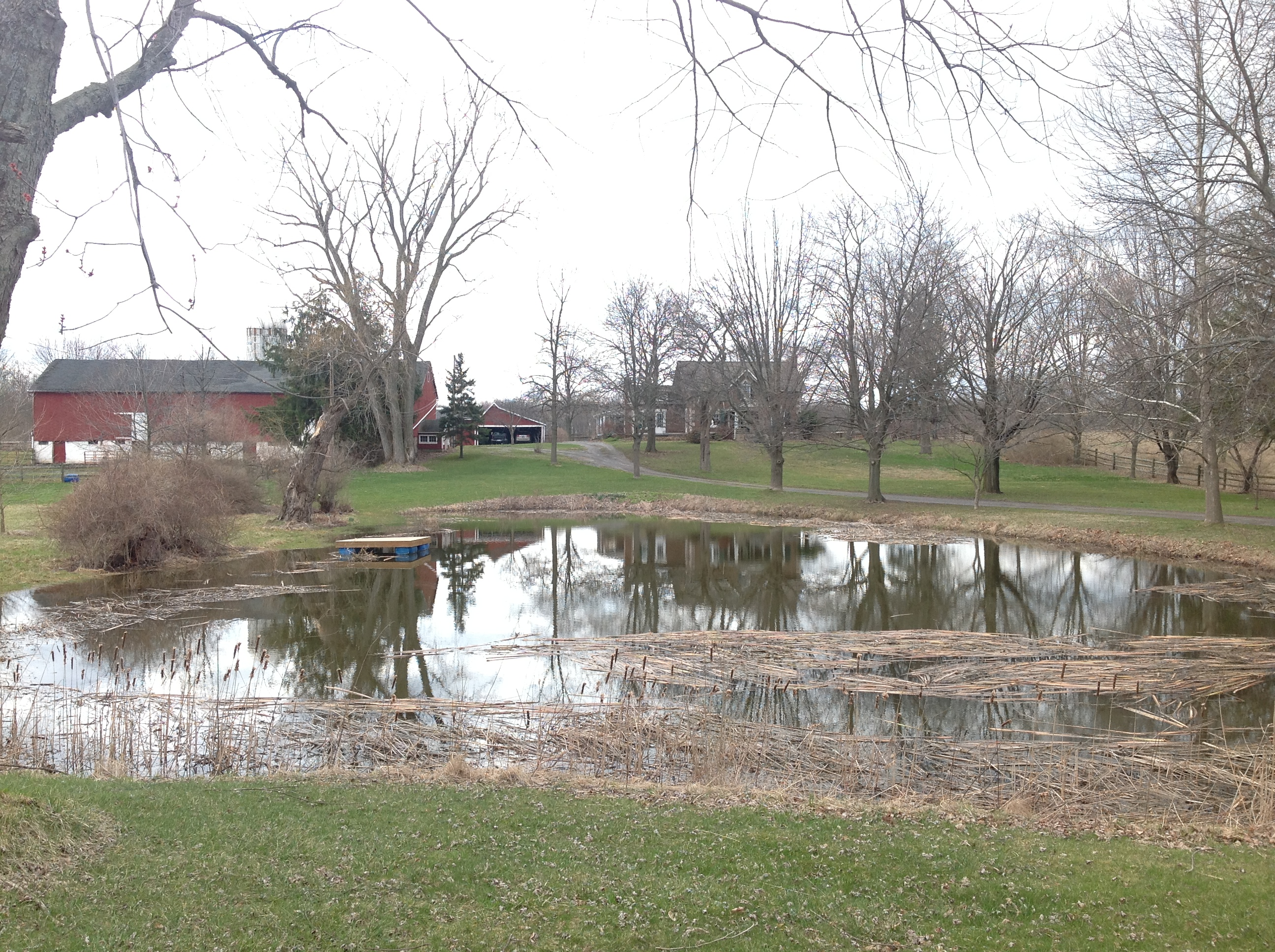
- J. and E. Baker Cobblestone Farmstead, April 2013

- Location within New York Location within the United States
- Location: 815 Canandaigua Rd., Macedon, New York
- Coordinates: 43°2′4″N 77°18′50″W
- Area: 234 acres (95 ha)
- Built: 1850
- Architectural style: Gothic Revival
- NRHP reference No.: 95001281
- Added to NRHP: November 07, 1995

J. and E. Baker Cobblestone Farmstead is a historic home located at Macedon in Wayne County, New York. The Gothic Revival style, cobblestone farmhouse consists of a 1 1/2-story, five-by-three-bay, rectangular main block with a 1-story side ell. It was built about 1850 and is constructed of nearly perfectly round, medium-sized, lake-washed cobbles. The house is among the approximately 170 surviving cobblestone buildings in Wayne County.

It was listed on the National Register of Historic Places in 1995.
