= Samuel Baker House (Mendon, Utah) =

- U.S. National Register of Historic Places
- Location within Utah
- Location: 150 W. 200 North, Mendon, Utah
- Coordinates: 41°42′45″N 111°58′50.5″W
- Area: less than one acre
- Built: c.1875
- Architectural style: Greek Revival, Vernacular Greek Revival
- NRHP reference No.: 83004417
- Added to NRHP: March 31, 1983

The Samuel Baker House, at 150 W. 200 North in Mendon, Utah, was built in the 1870s. It was listed on the National Register of Historic Places in 1983.

It is a one-and-a-half-story hall and parlor plan stone house, built with mild suggestion of Greek Revival style in the form of a plain cornice and frieze.
