= List of United States post offices in Wyoming =

United States post offices operate under the authority of the United States Post Office Department (1792–1971) or the United States Postal Service (since 1971). Historically, post offices were usually placed in a prominent location. Many were architecturally distinctive, including notable buildings featuring Beaux-Arts, Art Deco, and Vernacular architecture. However, modern U.S. post offices were generally designed for functionality rather than architectural style.

Following is a list of United States post offices in Wyoming. Notable post offices include individual buildings, whether still in service or not, which have architectural, historical, or community-related significance. Many of these are listed on the National Register of Historic Places (NRHP) or state and local historic registers.

Post office	City	Date built	Image	Architect	Notes	Ref.
Wyoming Mercantile	Aladdin	1896		Amos Robinson	(Note: Listed on the National Register of Historic Places.) (Note: No longer used as a post office.)	
United States Post Office (Basin, Wyoming)	Basin	1919		James A. Wetmore		
Buffalo Main Post Office	Buffalo	1911		James A. Wetmore		
Casper Federal Building (now Ewing T. Kerr Federal Building and U.S. Courthouse)	Casper	1932		James A. Wetmore		
United States Post Office (Douglas, Wyoming)	Douglas	1909		Oscar Wenderoth		
Evanston Main Post Office	Evanston	1905		James Knox Taylor		
Gillette Post Office	Gillette	1935		Louis A. Simon		
United States Post Office–Green River	Green River	1931		James A, Wetmore, Thomas C. Hyrum		
United States Post Office (Greybull, Wyoming)	Greybull	1937		Louis A. Simon		
Sussex Post Office and Store	Kaycee	1914		unknown		
United States Post Office (Kemmerer, Wyoming)	Kemmerer	1934		Louis A. Simon		
United States Post Office and Courthouse (Lander, Wyoming)	Lander	1907		James Knox Taylor		
Yellowstone Main Post Office	Mammoth	1936		Louis A. Simon		
United States Post Office (Newcastle, Wyoming)	Newcastle	1932		James A. Wetmore		
United States Post Office (Powell, Wyoming)	Powell	1937		Louis A. Simon		
First National Bank of Rock River	Rock River	1919		Southern Wyoming Lumber Company		
Thermopolis Main Post Office	Thermopolis	1933		James A. Wetmore		
United States Post Office (Torrington, Wyoming)	Torrington	1932		James A. Wetmore		
