= Main Post Office =

Main Post Office may refer to:

== United States ==
- Old Athens, Alabama Main Post Office, in Athens, Alabama
- United States Post Office (Basin, Wyoming), in Basin, Wyoming
- Beaver Main Post Office, in Beaver, Utah
- Beverly Hills Main Post Office, in Beverly Hills, California
- United States Post Office–Blackfoot Main, in Blackfoot, Idaho
- Buffalo Main Post Office, in Buffalo, Wyoming
- Old Chicago Main Post Office, in Chicago, Illinois
- United States Post Office (Douglas, Wyoming), in Douglas, Wyoming
- Elko Main Post Office, in Elko, Nevada
- Evanston Main Post Office, in Evanston, Wyoming
- United States Post Office and Courthouse–Glasgow Main, in Glasgow, Montana
- Glendale Main Post Office, in Glendale, California
- United States Post Office and Courthouse–Globe Main, in Globe, Arizona
- United States Post Office (Greenwich, Connecticut), in Greenwich, Connecticut
- United States Post Office (Greybull, Wyoming), in Greybull, Wyoming
- United States Post Office and Courthouse–Havre Main, in Havre, Montana
- Lewiston Main Post Office, in Lewiston, Maine
- United States Post Office and Courthouse–Littleton Main, in Littleton, New Hampshire
- Long Beach Main Post Office, in Long Beach, California
- United States Post Office–Meriden Main, in Meriden, Connecticut
- Miles City Main Post Office, in Miles City, Montana,
- New Brunswick Main Post Office, in New Brunswick, New Jersey
- United States Post Office–New London Main, in New London, Connecticut
- United States Post Office (Newcastle, Wyoming), in Newcastle, Wyoming
- Main Post Office and Federal Building (Oakland, California), listed on the NRHP in Alameda County
- Oconto Main Post Office, in Oconto, Wisconsin, listed on the NRHP in Oconto County
- United States Post Office (Palm Beach, Florida), in Palm Beach, Florida
- U.S. Post Office-Peterborough Main, in Peterborough, New Hampshire
- United States Post Office and Courthouse–Prescott Main, in Prescott, Arizona
- Reno Main Post Office, in Reno, Nevada
- United States Post Office (Somersworth, New Hampshire), in Somersworth, New Hampshire
- United States Post Office–Stamford Main, in Stamford, Connecticut
- Thermopolis Main Post Office, in Thermopolis, Wyoming
- Tonopah Main Post Office, in Tonopah, Nevada
- United States Post Office (Willows, California), in Willows, California
- Winnemucca Main Post Office, in Winnemucca, Nevada
- United States Post Office (Yellowstone National Park), in Yellowstone National Park, Wyoming

== Other countries ==
- General Post Office, Belgrade, in Belgrade, Serbia
- Bremen Main Post Office Building, in Bremen, Germany
- Main Post Office, Bydgoszcz, in Bydgoszcz, Poland
- Grand Post Office, in Istanbul, Turkey
- Main Post Office, Kraków, in Kraków, Poland
