= National Register of Historic Places listings in Weston County, Wyoming =

Location of Weston County in Wyoming

This is a list of the National Register of Historic Places listings in Weston County, Wyoming. It is intended to be a complete list of the properties and districts on the National Register of Historic Places in Weston County, Wyoming, United States. The locations of National Register properties and districts for which the latitude and longitude coordinates are included below, may be seen in a map.

There are 6 properties listed on the National Register in the county.

This National Park Service list is complete through NPS recent listings posted November 21, 2025.

Contents: Counties in Wyoming
Albany - Big Horn - Campbell - Carbon - Converse - Crook - Fremont - Goshen - Hot Springs - Johnson - Laramie - Lincoln - Natrona - Niobrara - Park - Platte - Sheridan - Sublette - Sweetwater - Teton - Uinta - Washakie - Weston

== Current listings ==
	Name on the Register	Image	Date listed	Location	City or town	Description
1	Cambria Casino	Cambria Casino	November 18, 1980 (#80004058)	23726 U.S. Route 85; 43°57′20″N 104°11′35″W	Newcastle	Large and finely crafted Tudor Revival resort lodge built in 1929 as a memorial to the coal mining town of Cambria, Wyoming.
2	Jenney Stockade Site	Jenney Stockade Site	September 30, 1969 (#69000198)	5402 U.S. Route 16; 43°48′37″N 104°06′48″W	Newcastle	Site of a base camp for military-supported mineral surveys in 1857 and 1875, followed by an 1877 stagecoach station on the Cheyenne to Deadwood route. Marked with a nearby interpretive sign, while the station has been partially reconstructed in Newcastle.
3	Newcastle Commercial District	Newcastle Commercial District	April 21, 2009 (#08001061)	Bounded by Burlington Northern & Santa Fe Railroad tracks and West Main Street; 43°51′18″N 104°12′13″W	Newcastle	Downtown with 23 contributing properties built 1890–1952, charting Newcastle's growth, commercial development, and architectural styles. Further noted for its distinctive sandstone buildings and retaining walls.
4	US Post Office-Newcastle Main	US Post Office-Newcastle Main	May 19, 1987 (#87000791)	24 West Main Street; 43°51′18″N 104°12′10″W	Newcastle	1933 Stripped Neoclassical post office credited to the advocacy of former Congressman Frank W. Mondell, and symbolizing a connection to the federal government and federal confidence in Newcastle's future growth. Also a contributing property to the Newcastle Commercial District.
5	Weston County Courthouse	Weston County Courthouse	September 1, 2001 (#01000930)	1 West Main Street; 43°51′21″N 104°12′09″W	Newcastle	County courthouse built 1910–1911, significant for representing the stability and success brought to Newcastle by securing county seat status. Also a contributing property to the Newcastle Commercial District.
6	Wyoming Army National Guard Cavalry Stable	Wyoming Army National Guard Cavalry Stable	July 7, 1994 (#94000680)	401 Delaware Street; 43°50′59″N 104°11′34″W	Newcastle	Wyoming's only surviving National Guard stable, built with New Deal funding 1933–1936; symbolizing the economic and social impact of the local National Guard unit in Newcastle. Became the Anna Miller Museum in 1966.

== Former listing ==
	Name on the Register	Image	Date listed	Date removed	Location	City or town	Description
1	Toomey's Mills	Toomey's Mills	November 13, 2008 (#08001062)	December 11, 2013	500 West Main Street (Original location. Now located at:); 44°35′16″N 104°41′55″W	Newcastle	Removed in 2012 for a convenience store. Reconstructed at the entrance to Devils Tower National Monument in 2015.

== See also ==
- List of National Historic Landmarks in Wyoming
- National Register of Historic Places listings in Wyoming
