= List of museums in Wyoming =

This list of museums in Wyoming encompasses museums defined for this context as institutions (including nonprofit organizations, government entities, and private businesses) that collect and care for objects of cultural, artistic, scientific, or historical interest and make their collections or related exhibits available for public viewing. Museums that exist only in cyberspace (i.e., virtual museums) are not included.

== Museums ==
Name	Location	County	Region	Type	Website, Notes
Anna Miller Museum	Newcastle	Weston	Northeast	Local history	Includes period displays, general store exhibit, one room school house, log cabin, fossils and local history displays
Brinton Museum	Big Horn	Sheridan	Central	Multiple	1920s and 30s gentleman's working ranch with collections of fine art, furnishings, historic and Native American artifacts
Buffalo Bill Center of the West	Cody	Park	Northwest	Multiple	Complex of museums about history, Native Americans, natural history, Western art and firearms
Campbell County Rockpile Museum	Gillette	Campbell	Northeast	Local history	website, includes rifles, saddles, Native American artifacts, fossils, quilts, and other memorabilia, coal mine video and exhibit, children's activities
Carbon County Museum	Rawlins	Carbon	Southeast	Local history	website, exhibits include Union Pacific Railroad, pioneers, residents and outlaws, Native Americans, agriculture, and inventor Thomas Edison
Charles Belden Museum of Western Photography	Meeteetse	Park	Northwest	Photography	website, photographic works of Charles Belden, mostly from about 1914 to the 1940s, personal and family memorabilia of the photographer, his family, and the historic Pitchfork Ranch, photography gallery
Cheyenne Depot Museum	Cheyenne	Laramie	Southeast	Railroad	
Cheyenne Frontier Days Old West Museum	Cheyenne	Laramie	Southeast	American West	website, Exhibits include Western horse-drawn carriages and wagons, Cheyenne Frontier Days rodeo celebration, local history, pioneer artifacts and clothing, and Western and folk art
Chinese Joss House Museum	Evanston	Uinta	Southwest	Ethnic	website, area Chinese immigration history from the 1870s through the 1930s
Chugwater Museum	Chugwater	Platte	Southeast	Local history	
Cody Dug Up Gun Museum	Cody	Park	Northwest	Military	website, relic guns & other weapons from many time periods and locations
Colter Bay Visitor Center & Indian Arts Museum	Grand Teton National Park	Teton	Northwest	Native American	website, American Indian artifacts donated by the Rockefeller family
Craig Thomas Discovery and Visitor Center	Grand Teton National Park	Teton	Northwest	Multiple	Natural history of Grand Teton National Park, mountaineering, Western artifacts
Crimson Dawn Park and Museum	Casper	Natrona	Central	Geology	website, includes 1929 original log cabin home of artist Neal Forsling and her family
Crook County Museum & Art Gallery	Sundance	Crook	Northeast	Multiple	website, exhibits include pioneer and Western artifacts, Vore Buffalo Jump, General George Custer, trial of the Sundance Kid, art gallery
Devils Tower National Monument	Hulett	Crook	Northeast	Multiple	Visitor center exhibits about the geology, natural history and importance to area Native Americans of the monument
Don King Museum	Sheridan	Sheridan	Northeast	History	website, Western and cowboy memorabilia, wagons, coaches, Indian artifacts, guns, Western tack and original artwork
Dubois Museum	Dubois	Fremont	Northwest	Local history	Area Sheepeater Shoshone, petroglyphs, railroad, emigrants, geology, ranch furnishings and equipment
Evans Dahl Memorial Museum	Lander	Fremont	Northwest	Sports	Memorabilia of the area one shot antelope hunt
First National Bank Museum	Meeteetse	Park	Northwest	History	Early 20th century bank with furnishings
Fishing Bridge Museum	Yellowstone National Park	Park	Northwest	Natural history	Wildlife found in Yellowstone National Park
Fort Bridger	Fort Bridger	Uinta	Southwest	Fort	Restored 19th-century fur-trading fort barracks with museum, original buildings and reconstructed trading post
Fort Caspar Museum and Historic Site	Casper	Natrona	Central	Military	Includes reconstructed log fort buildings and a museum
Fort Fetterman Historic Site	Douglas	Converse	Southeast	Military	Trail through mid 19th-century fort ruins, restored officer's quarters and an ordnance warehouse with exhibits
Fort Laramie National Historic Site	Near Torrington, WY	Goshen	Southeast	Military	Visitor center museum with exhibits, restored fort buildings
Fort Phil Kearny State Historic Site	Story	Johnson	Northeast	Military	Visitor center with exhibits, tour of fort remains
Fort Fred Steele State Historic Site	Sinclair	Carbon	Southeast	Fort	Remains of the mid 19th century fort
Fossil Country Frontier Museum	Kemmerer	Lincoln	Southwest	Local history	website
Fossil Butte National Monument	Kemmerer	Lincoln	Southwest	Natural history	Visitor center features fossil exhibits
Fremont County Pioneer Museum	Lander	Fremont	Northwest	History	website, artifacts from prehistory through the 1920s from the Lander Valley, Fremont County and western Wyoming
Glendo Historical Museum	Glendo	Platte	Central	Local history	Local history, paleontology and natural history displays
Grand Encampment Museum	Encampment	Carbon	Southeast	Open air	website, timber, mining, and agricultural history, pioneer village and two-story outhouse
Green River Valley Museum	Big Piney	Sublette	Southwest	Local history	website, exhibits include livestock brands, area coal mines, Wardell Buffalo Trap, restored homesteader cabin, ranching equipment, period displays
Guernsey State Park Museum	Guernsey	Platte	Southeast	Local history	Exhibits about the Civilian Conservation Corps and the natural and cultural history of the park
Hanna Basin Museum	Hanna	Carbon	Southeast	Local history	Coal mining town, ranching and railroad history
Heart Mountain Wyoming Interpretive Learning Center	Powell	Park	Northwest	History	History of the World War II internment camp for Japanese Americans
Historic Governors' Mansion	Cheyenne	Laramie	Southeast	Historic house	Decorated to represent the 1905, 1937, 1955 and 1960s eras when it served as the home of the governor
Homesteader Museum	Powell	Park	Northwest	Local history	website
Homesteaders Museum	Torrington	Goshen	Southeast	Local history	Includes ranching and homestead artifacts, railroad and transportation displays
Hoofprints of the Past Museum	Kaycee	Johnson	Northeast	Local history	website, displays include Native Americans, Fort Reno, cattle barons and cowboys, Johnson County War, historic buildings
Hot Springs County Museum & Cultural Center	Thermopolis	Hot Springs	Northwest	Local history	website, exhibits include outlaws, Native Americans, oil & gas industries, coal mining, area wildlife, period Main Street business displays
J.C. Penney House	Kemmerer	Lincoln	Southwest	Historic house	Home of James Cash Penney, town is site of first J.C. Penney's store in the U.S.
Jackson Hole Museum	Jackson	Teton	Northwest	History	Website, operated by the Jackson Hole Historical Society
Jim Gatchell Memorial Museum	Buffalo	Johnson	Northeast	History	Dioramas and artifacts of Johnson County and frontier history
Lander Art Center	Lander	Fremont	Northwest	Art	website, hosts 8 annual exhibitions of paintings, drawings, sculpture, ceramics, photography and other media
Lander Children's Museum	Lander	Fremont	Northwest	Children's	website
Laramie Peak Museum	Wheatland	Platte	Central	Local history	
Laramie Plains Museum	Laramie	Albany	Southeast	Historic house	Late 19th-century period Victorian mansion
Little Snake River Museum	Savery	Carbon	Southeast	Open air	website, includes Mountain man Jim Baker's two story log cabin, other buildings, cabins and historic houses, pioneer history, local ranching history, antique machinery, interactive exhibits, recreated bar and barbershop, gift shop
Madison Museum	Yellowstone National Park	Teton	Northwest	Natural history	
Medicine Bow Museum	Medicine Bow	Carbon		Local history	
Meeteetse Museums	Meeteetse	Park	Northwest	Local history	website, consists of the Meeteetse Museum, Charles Belden Museum of Western Photography, and the First National Bank of Meeteetse Museum. Exhibits include the endangered black-footed ferret, the Meeteetse Mercantile, wild sheep of North America, Harry Jackson sculptures, a Forest Service cabin, local western cowboy tack and saddles, "Little Wahb" the grizzly, Olive Fell Art Gallery, First National Bank of Meeteetse memorabilia, Charles Belden photography and Pitchfork Ranch memorabilia
Mormon Handcart Historic Site	Alcova	Carbon	Southeast	History	website, history and artifacts used by the Mormon handcart pioneers
Museum of Flight and Aerial Firefighting	Greybull	Big Horn	Northwest	Aviation	website, aircraft include World War II bombers and transport aircraft, and firefighting planes
Museum of the American West	Lander	Fremont	Northwest	Open-air	website, includes pioneer village with 10 buildings, natural and cultural history of the South Pass, Sweetwater and Wind River valley areas
Museum of the Mountain Man	Pinedale	Sublette	Southwest	History	
National Bighorn Sheep Interpretive Center	Dubois	Fremont	Northwest	Natural history	Biology and habitat needs of the Rocky Mountain Bighorn Sheep
National Museum of Military Vehicles	Dubois	Fremont	Northwest	Military	Large collection of military vehicles
National Historic Trails Interpretive Center	Casper	Natrona	Central	American West	History of America's westward expansion, including Native Americans, explorers and mountain men, emigrants and Pony Express riders
National Museum of Wildlife Art	Jackson	Teton	Northwest	Art	Fine art about wildlife
Nelson Museum of the West	Cheyenne	Laramie	Southeast	Multiple	website, includes Native American, cowboy and rodeo artifacts, period room displays, weapons and military displays, natural history dioramas, fine Western art
Nici Self Museum	Centennial	Albany	Southeast	Local history	website, partially housed in a 1907 Hahn's Peak and Pacific Railroad depot, exhibits include local ranching, farming, and mining equipment and history
Nicolaysen Art Museum	Casper	Natrona	Central	Art	website, contemporary art
Norris Geyser Basin Museum	Yellowstone National Park	Park	Northwest	Natural history	Geothermal geology, features of Norris Geyser and plant and animal life in thermal areas
Old Trail Town	Cody	Park	Northwest	Open air	Includes over 26 historic buildings and artifacts, horse-drawn vehicles, Native American artifacts and memorabilia of the Wyoming frontier
Old West Wax Museum and Dancing Bear Folk Center	Thermopolis	Hot Springs	Northwest	Multiple	Wax figures of famous people of the Old West, collection of teddy bears, historic documents, textile center
Paleon Museum	Glenrock	Converse	Southeast	Natural history	Facebook site, also known as the Glenrock Paleontological MuseumWyoming dinosaurs, fossils and paleontology
Parco/Sinclair Historic District Museum	Sinclair	Carbon	Southeast	Local history	
Pathfinder Dam Interpretive Center	Casper	Natrona	Central	Technology	History of the construction of Pathfinder Dam, open by appointment
Quebec-One Missile Alert Facility	Cheyenne	Laramie	Southwest	Military	Restored Cold War-era United States Air Force ICBM control facility
Red Onion Museum	Upton	Weston	Northeast	Local history	
Ripley's Believe It or Not!	Jackson	Teton	Northwest	Amusement	
Riverton Museum	Riverton	Fremont	Central	Local history	website, city history, eastern Fremont County communities, the Eastern Shoshone peoples, the Northern Arapaho peoples and regional history
Robert A. Peck Arts Center	Riverton	Fremont	Central	Art	website, part of Central Wyoming College, includes a contemporary art gallery and outdoor sculpture exhibit
Rock Springs Community Fine Arts Center	Rock Springs	Sweetwater	Southwest	Art	website
Rock Springs Historical Museum	Rock Springs	Sweetwater	Southwest	Local history	website
Salt Creek Museum	Midwest	Natrona	Northeast	Industry	History of the Salt Creek Oil Field and oilfield industry, period room displays
Saratoga Museum	Saratoga	Carbon	Southeast	History, geology	website, exhibits include gems, minerals, Wyoming jade, fossils, pioneer home life artifacts
Science Zone	Casper	Natrona	Central	Science	website, hands-on science and engineering displays for children, live animals
Sheridan County Museum	Sheridan	Sheridan	Northeast	Local history	Website, operated by the Sheridan County Historical Society, exhibits include railroads, coal mining, Tongue River log flume, Battle of the Rosebud
Shoshone Tribal Cultural Center	Fort Washakie	Fremont	Northwest	Native Americans	Heritage and culture of the Eastern Shoshone
South Pass City State Historic Site	South Pass City	Fremont	Southwest	Open air	Over 30 historic structures dating from the city's heyday in the 1860s and 1870s
Stagecoach Museum	Lusk	Niobrara	Southeast	Local history	website, relics from the 19th-and 20th-centuries including a stagecoach
Stolen Bell Museum	Diamondville	Lincoln	Southwest	Local history	
Sweetwater County Historical Museum	Green River	Sweetwater	Southwest	Local history	website
Tate Geological Museum	Casper	Natrona	Central	Geology	website, part of Casper College, gems, fossils, minerals
Ten Sleep Pioneer Museum	Ten Sleep	Washakie	Northeast	History	Pioneer life and artifacts
Texas Trail Museum	Pine Bluffs	Laramie	Southeast	Local history	
Trail End State Historic Site	Sheridan	Sheridan	Northeast	Historic house	Early 20th-century mansion home of Governor John B. Kendrick
Uinta County Museum	Evanston	Uinta	Southwest	Local history	website, includes local history, ranching, household, railroad, fashion, military, Native American, and Chinese displays
University of Wyoming Anthropology Museum	Laramie	Albany	Southeast	Anthropology	
University of Wyoming Art Museum	Laramie	Albany	Southeast	Art	Historic and contemporary art
University of Wyoming Geological Museum	Laramie	Albany	Southeast	Natural history	Fossils, rocks, and mineral specimens
University of Wyoming Insect Museum	Laramie	Albany	Southeast	Natural history	Research collection and exhibit gallery
Warren ICBM & Heritage Museum	Cheyenne	Laramie	Southeast	Military	website, history of F. E. Warren Air Force Base, history of missiles and the 90th Space Wing
Washakie Museum & Cultural Center	Worland	Washakie	Northwest	Multiple	website, fossils and Colby mammoth kill site display, Shoshone artifacts, art, pioneer and local history
Weidner Wildlife Museum	Rock Springs	Sweetwater	Southwest	Natural history	Part of Western Wyoming Community College, mounted wildlife specimens
Werner Wildlife Museum	Casper	Natrona	Central	Natural history	website, part of Casper College
Western History Center	Lingle	Goshen	Southeast	Multiple	Local history, paleontology
Western Wyoming Community College campus displays	Rock Springs	Sweetwater	Southwest	Multiple	Includes an art gallery, five life sized dinosaur displays, nine replica Easter Island statues, other sculptures, fossils, geology and archaeological artifacts
Wind River Heritage Center	Riverton	Fremont	Central	Multiple	Mounted wildlife and wax figures depicting Wyoming history
Wright Centennial Museum	Wright	Campbell	Northeast	History	website
Wyoming Dinosaur Center	Thermopolis	Hot Springs	Northwest	Paleontology	Includes over 30 mounted dinosaur skeletons, fossil displays and dioramas, and a preparation lab with visitor viewing
Wyoming Frontier Prison	Rawlins	Carbon	Southeast	Prison	Tours of the 1901 former prison, history of the prison and current Wyoming State Penitentiary, Wyoming Peace Officer's Museum
Wyoming Governor's Mansion	Cheyenne	Laramie	Southeast	Historic house	
Wyoming National Guard Museum	Cheyenne	Laramie	Southeast	Military	website, history of the Wyoming National Guard
Wyoming Pioneer Memorial Museum	Douglas	Converse	Southeast	History	website, period displays, antiques and pioneer artifacts, located on the Wyoming State Fairgrounds
Wyoming State Capitol	Cheyenne	Laramie	Southeast	Historic site	
Wyoming State Museum	Cheyenne	Laramie	Southeast	Multiple	Includes Wyoming history, art, natural history and fossils, industry, Native Americans, pioneers and cultural heritage
Wyoming Territorial Prison State Historic Site	Laramie	Albany	Southeast	Prison	Late 19th-century prison
Wyoming Veterans' Memorial Museum	Casper	Natrona	Central	Military	website, located at the Casper/Natrona County International Airport, stories of state veterans who have served in the armed forces spanning the Spanish–American War to the modern era

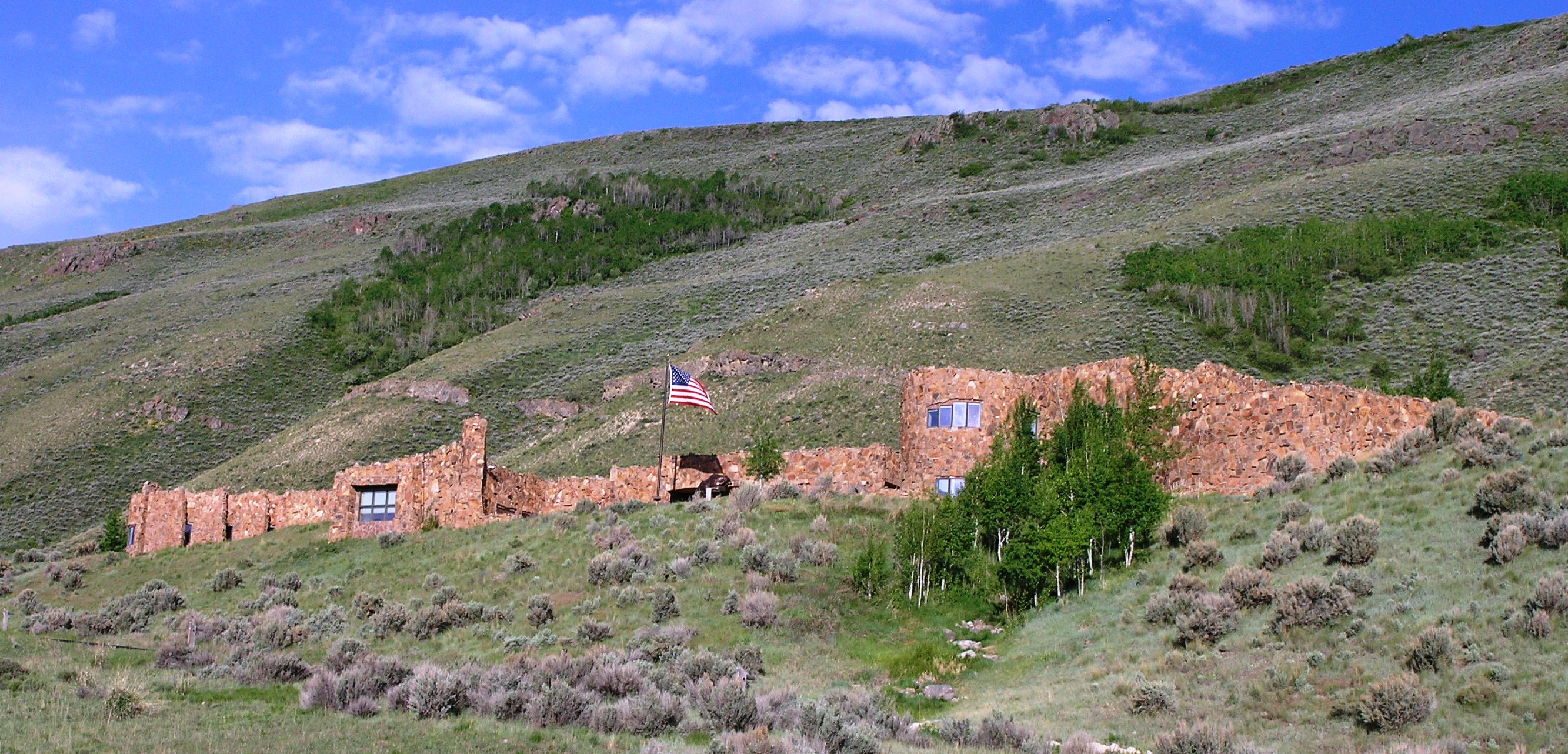
National Museum of Wildlife Art, Jackson

== Defunct listings ==
- Old West Wax Museum, Thermopolis, closed in 2010, displays now at Wind River Heritage Center in Riverton
- Tecumsah's Old West Miniature Village & Museum, Cody
- Wyoming Children's Museum and Nature Center, Laramie, closed in 2010
