= Weston County Library =

Weston County Public Library

General information
- Coordinates: 43.8547°N 104.2053°W

Design and construction
- Architect: Charles A. Randall

The Weston County Library is one of 16 Carnegie Libraries built in Wyoming, funded by the Carnegie Library Program and constructed in 1911 with a $12,500 grant. Today, it still stands and operates as the Weston County Public Library.

== Funding ==
The women of the Twentieth Century Club formed a committee to look into building the library. With the help of Frank Mondell, Wyoming's US Representative and Newcastle's first mayor, the group was awarded the grant from the Carnegie Library Fund. Prior to receiving the fund the group had to prove they had a "going library" of 100 books or more. In January 1911 the Weston County Library was opened in the back of the existing courthouse. In February 1911, Frank Mondell was notified that they would receive the funding from the Carnegie Library Fund. The Weston County Commissioners gave the group the land with no expense. All of the furnishings within the building were provided by the Twentieth Century Club.

== Construction and building style ==
The building was designed by Charles A. Randall, who also designed the neighboring Weston County Courthouse. Construction of the library began in September 1911, led by Sullivan Speilman of Gillette, WY. The building reflects a simplified Classical Revival architectural style. Following the architectural trends of the time, the structure features minimal ornamentation, in line with Carnegie's emphasis on cost efficiency for libraries. While it aligns most closely with the Beaux-Arts style, the design is much simpler. Key characteristics of this style are evident in the library's design.

The exterior is symmetrical, with a central main entrance flanked by two windows on each side, all featuring brick detailing. While the building lacks true columns, it incorporates decorative elements that mimic classical columns. Additionally, the use of sandstone and brick aligns with the architectural style of the period.

== Completion and use ==
The library was completed around August 1912, and books were moved into the facility on August 6 of that year. Anna Miller served as the first librarian. Initially, the library included a Club Room for the Twentieth Century Club to hold meetings. However, by the 1940s, the library's operations had expanded, requiring the Club Room to be repurposed.

In 1983, an addition was built, and the original structure underwent remodeling. Today, the building retains much of its original style and continues to operate as the Weston County Public Library.
