= Newcastle Commercial District (Wyoming) =

Historic district in Wyoming, United States

- U.S. National Register of Historic Places
- U.S. Historic district
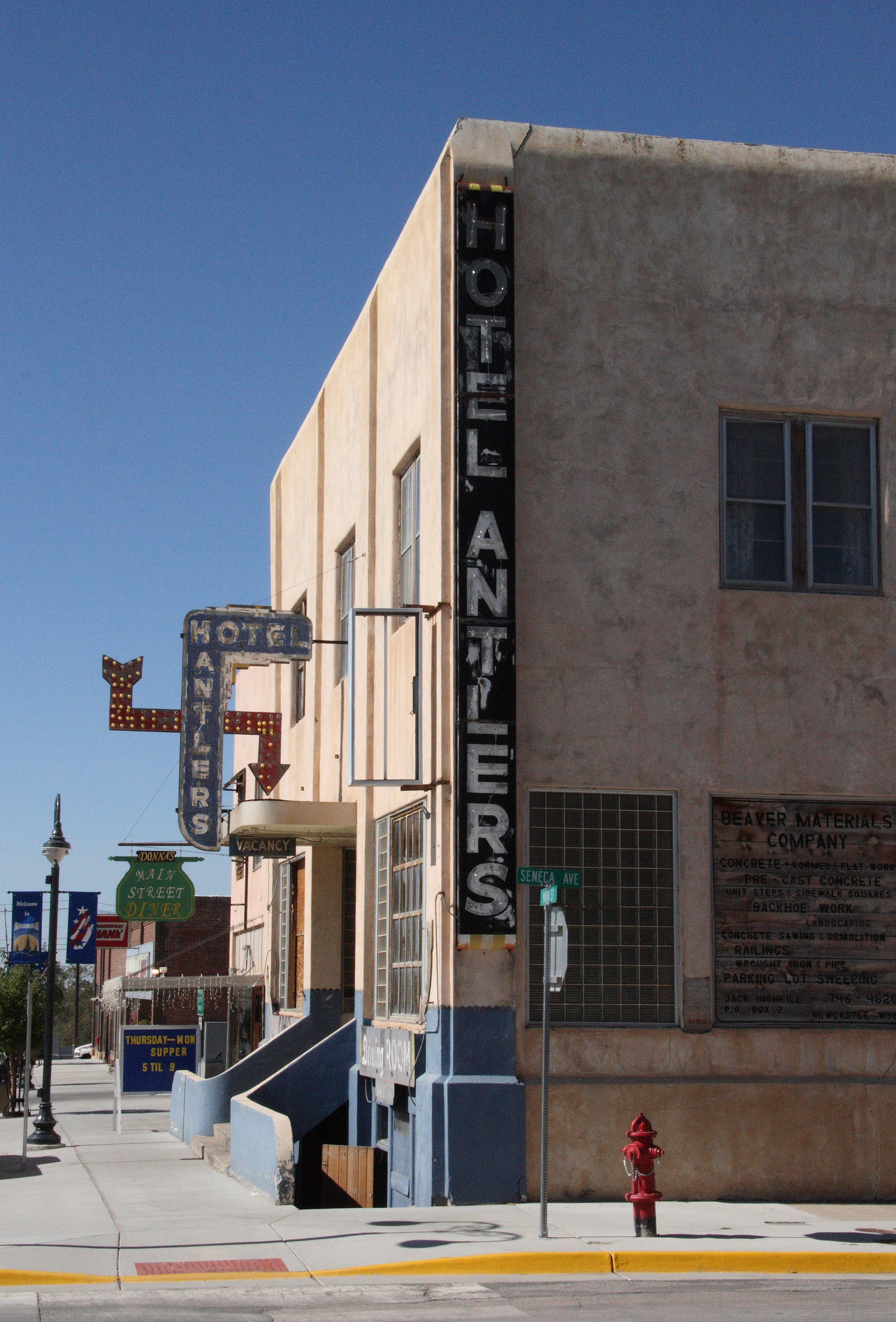
- Hotel Antlers

- Location within Wyoming Location within the United States
- Location: Bounded by Burlington Northern Santa-Fe Railroad tracks and West Main St., Newcastle, Wyoming
- Coordinates: 43.85493°N 104.20452°W
- Area: 8.5 acres (3.4 ha)
- Built: 1890
- Architectural style: Classical Revival, Italianate, Moderne
- NRHP reference No.: 08001061
- Added to NRHP: October 03, 2008

The Newcastle Commercial District in Newcastle, Wyoming comprises the commercial center of this isolated Wyoming town. The town developed along the Burlington and Missouri Railroad in the late 1880s, with the commercial district taking shape between 1890 and 1952. The district includes twenty-three buildings, primarily commercial buildings, including two properties that are separately listed on the National Register of Historic Places: the Weston County Courthouse and the Newcastle Main Post Office. All of the buildings are considered "contributing properties" to the historic district.

The district lies along either side of West Main Street, also known as US Route 16, near its intersection with what is now the BNSF Railway. US 16, as the Black and Yellow Trail, was a primary route linking the tourist centers of the Black Hills and Yellowstone National Park. The district was influenced by a series of fires that destroyed a number of buildings, which were replaced with newer buildings in styles such as Streamline Moderne, Beaux-Arts, and Mission styles, complementing pre-existing late Victorian architecture.
