= Charles A. Randall =

American architect (1871–?)

- Born: July 9, 1871; Logansport, Indiana, US
- Occupation: Architect
- Practice: Rhodes & Randall

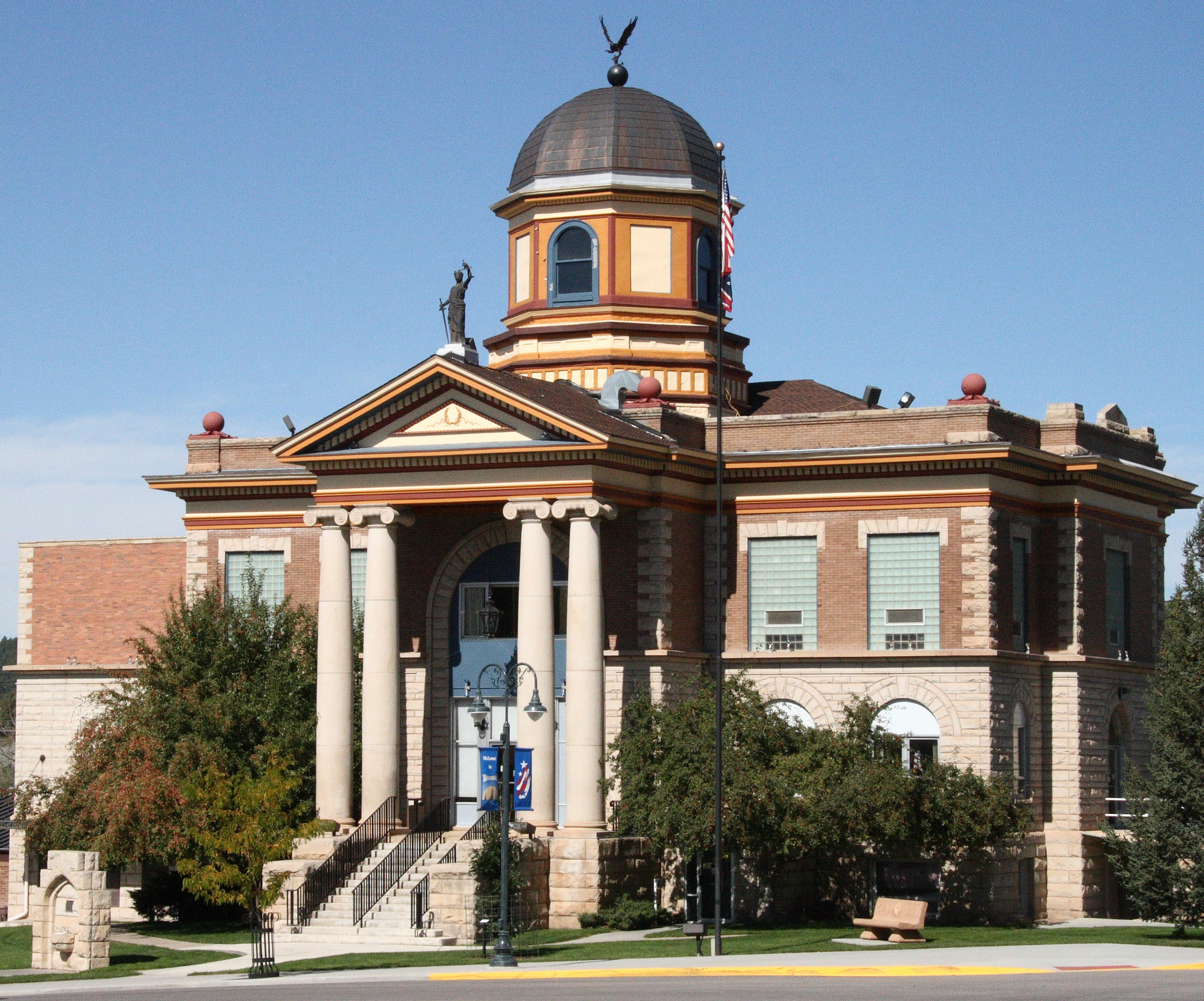
Weston County Courthouse, Newcastle, Wyoming, 1909.

Charles A. Randall (July 9, 1871 – ?) was an American architect who practiced in Indiana, South Dakota and Wyoming.

== Life and career ==
Randall was born on July 9, 1871, in Logansport, Indiana, to Charles H. and Augusta J. Randall (née Thissel), both natives of New England. After graduating from the public schools, he attended the University of Illinois at Urbana, where he studied architecture. After leaving the University, he spent three years in an architect's office in Chicago. After a short time spent in Lead, South Dakota, where he was briefly married, he returned in 1893 to Logansport. There, he joined the office of architect James H. Rhodes. In 1899 he and Rhodes established a partnership, Rhodes & Randall.

In 1901, this partnership was dissolved, and Randall relocated to Deadwood, South Dakota, near Lead. There, he joined the office of Otho C. Jewett, who had been practicing there since at least 1898. In April 1902, Jewett died, and Randall took over the practice. His first major project in Deadwood was the Franklin Hotel, plans for which Jewett had just begun at the time of his death. He remained in Deadwood until 1905, when he relocated to Casper, Wyoming. From there, in 1909, he went to Newcastle, same state. In 1911, he briefly returned to South Dakota, settling in Belle Fourche. By 1913, he had settled in Sheridan, Wyoming, where he appears to have remained for the rest of his career.

== Legacy ==
At least three of Randall's buildings have been placed on the National Register of Historic Places, and at least two more contribute to listed historic districts.

== Architectural works ==
Year	Building	Address	City	State	Notes	Image	Reference
1899	Linc W. Pilling House	1012 High St	Logansport	Indiana			
1902	Franklin Hotel	709 Main St	Deadwood	South Dakota			
1903	Deadwood High School	716 Main St	Deadwood	South Dakota	Demolished.		
1903	Science Hall	Spearfish Normal School	Spearfish	South Dakota	Demolished.		
1904	First National Bank Building	696 Main St	Deadwood	South Dakota			
1906	Casper Public Library	302 E 2nd St	Casper	Wyoming	Demolished.		
1907	Natrona County Courthouse	200 N Center St	Casper	Wyoming	Demolished.		
1909	Weston County Courthouse	1 W Main St	Newcastle	Wyoming			
1911	Butte County Courthouse	839 5th Ave	Belle Fourche	South Dakota			
1911	Deadwood Auditorium	105 Sherman St	Deadwood	South Dakota			
1914	Holy Name R. C. School	121 S Connor St	Sheridan	Wyoming			
1916	Linden Avenue School	345 S Linden Ave	Sheridan	Wyoming	Demolished.		
1916	Mills Company Building	30 N Gould St	Sheridan	Wyoming			
