= Catherine M. Parks =

Wyoming politician

Member of the Wyoming Senate from the Campbell-Johnson district
- In office 1978–1981

Catherine M. Parks is an American Republican politician from Newcastle, Wyoming. She represented the Campbell-Johnson district in the Wyoming Senate from 1978 to 1981.
