= Charles Randall =

Charles Randall may refer to:

- Charles Randall (footballer) (1884–1916), English footballer
- Charles A. Randall (1871–?), American architect practicing in Indiana, South Dakota, and Wyoming
- Charles Hiram Randall (1865–1951), Californian politician
- Charles Randall (Maine politician) (1846–1924)
- Charles S. Randall (1824–1904), member of the United States House of Representatives from Massachusetts
