= Cambria Casino =

- U.S. National Register of Historic Places
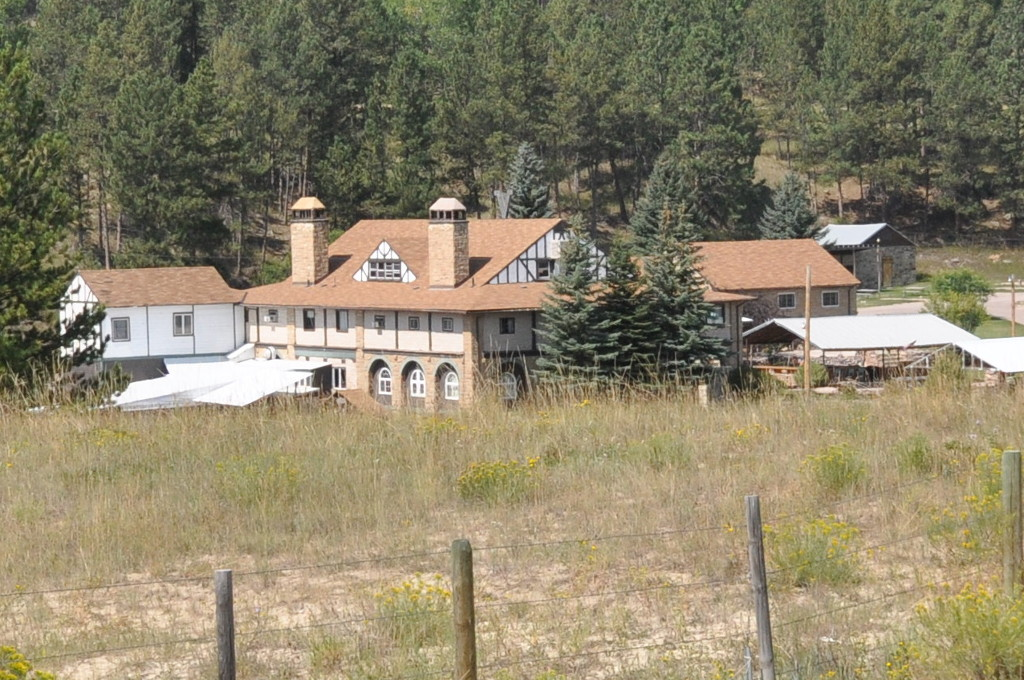

- Location within Wyoming Location within the United States
- Nearest city: Newcastle, Wyoming
- Coordinates: 43°57′20″N 104°11′35″W
- Built: 1927
- Architect: Rabenold, Bruce
- Architectural style: Tudor Revival
- NRHP reference No.: 80004058
- Added to NRHP: November 18, 1980

The Cambria Casino, also known as the Flying V Guest Ranch and the Cambria Casino Park-Memorial, is a resort on the western edge of the Black Hills in Weston County, Wyoming. The resort was named for Cambria, a nearby coal-mining community. The two-story sandstone lodge, designed by New York architect Bruce Rabenold, employs English Tudor and other medieval details to create a Tudor manor-like setting in the Wyoming hills. The lodge fronts on a court, entered through a gatehouse and originally flanked by wings housing guest rooms. The property is significant as an example of a unique eclectically style resort in eastern Wyoming. A portion of the casino was intended to serve as a memorial to Cambria-area miners.

The dance hall opened on January 12, 1929. Seventy-five guests could be accommodated in the main building and in six cottages. The cottages have since been removed. The resort featured a freshwater pool fed by Salt Creek and a saltwater pool fed from salt springs about 2 miles (3.2 km) away.

The interior features a second floor ballroom with a timber-framed roof resembling a medieval hammer-beam truss. The timbers may have come from area mines. Beneath the ballroom were a dining room, auxiliary dining room, kitchen sitting room and six guest rooms.

The Cambria Casino was placed on the National Register of Historic Places in 1980.
