= Butte County Courthouse and Historic Jail Building =

- U.S. National Register of Historic Places
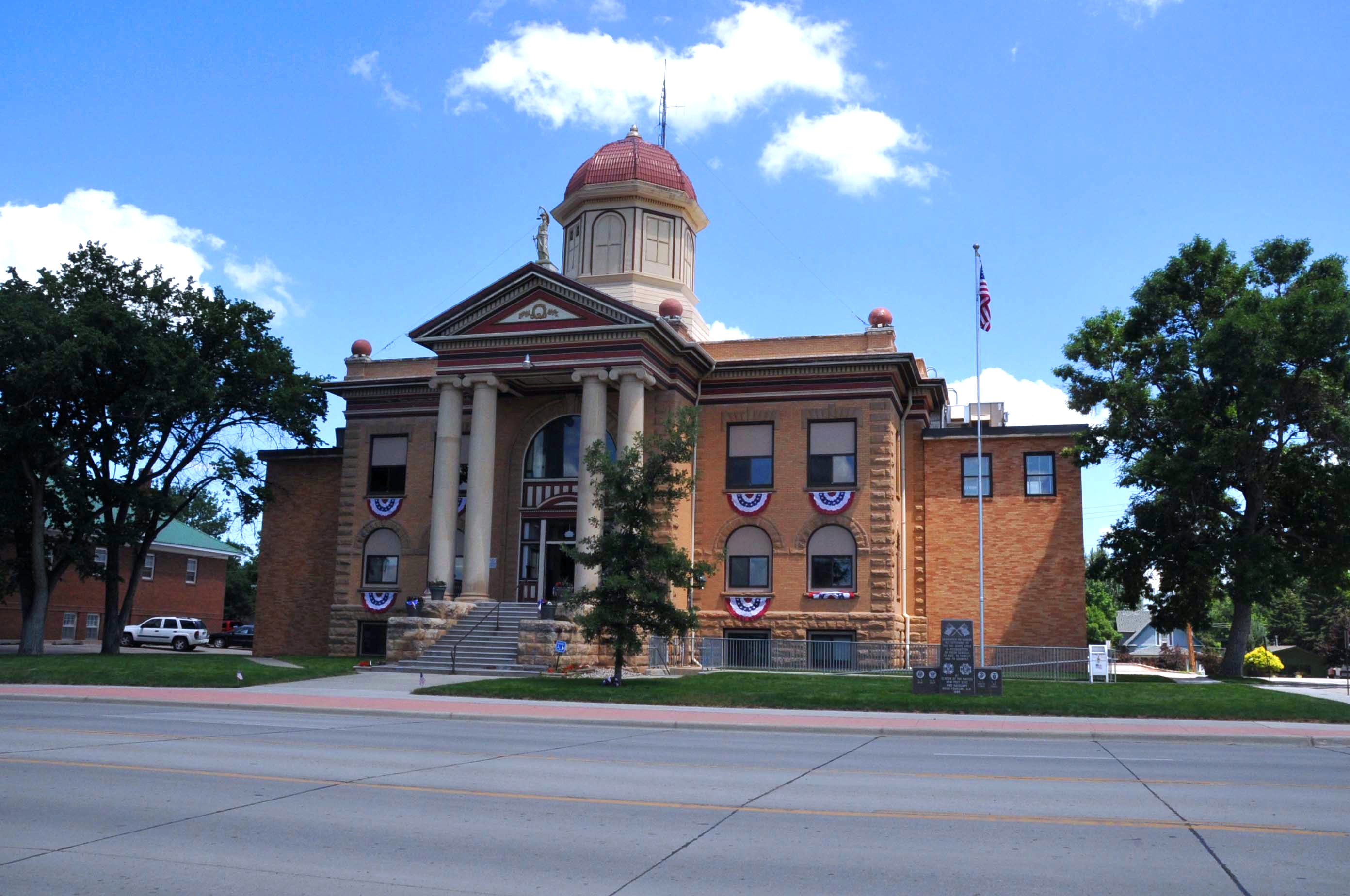
- Butte County Courthouse, 2013

- Location within South Dakota Location within the United States
- Interactive map showing the location of Butte County Courthouse and Historic Jail Building
- Location: 839 5th Ave., Belle Fourche, South Dakota
- Coordinates: 44°40′12″N 103°48′54″W
- Area: less than one acre
- Built: 1911
- Built by: John A. Scotney; Phillips & Bartlett
- Architect: Charles A. Randall
- Architectural style: Beaux Arts, Classical Revival
- MPS: County Courthouses of South Dakota MPS
- NRHP reference No.: 98001398
- Added to NRHP: December 3, 1998

The Butte County Courthouse and Historic Jail Building is a historic site in Belle Fourche, South Dakota. The buildings were placed on the National Register of Historic Places in 1998, with its significance being its association with the growth of local government in western plains communities, local figure Seth Bullock, and for making use of Classical architecture, representative of contemporary South Dakota public buildings.

== Butte County Courthouse ==
The Butte County Courthouse is a two-story building with a raised basement, built in 1911. The building's foundation was built with local sandstone from the quarry at Hot Springs. The design exhibits Classical Revival and Beaux-Arts elements. The building's architect was Charles A. Randall of Newcastle, Wyoming, whose design for the building is very similar the courthouses he designed for Natrona and Weston Counties, Wyoming. The building's most imposing elements are its massive cupola and Ionic portico. In 1964, modernist additions were built on both the north and souths sides of the building.

The interior public spaces have largely remained in original condition.

== Butte County Jail ==
The jail, built in 1901, is located east of the courthouse on 6th Avenue. It is a small Romanesque Revival building designed by an unknown architect. The builder was stonemason John A. Scotney, who built the building out of native red sandstone. The building originally housed the county jail as well as a residence for the sheriff and his family. Today, the original building serves as the County Dispatch Center while a modern addition houses the sheriff's office and staff.
