= Wyoming Army National Guard Cavalry Stable =

- U.S. National Register of Historic Places
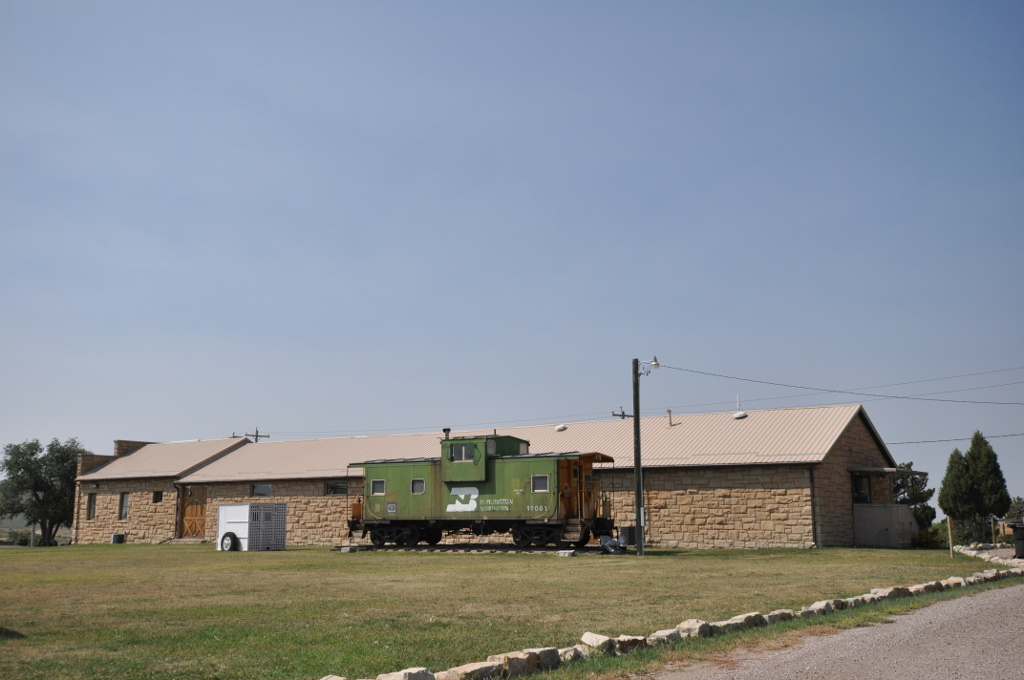

- Location within Wyoming Location within the United States
- Location: 401 Delaware St., Newcastle, Wyoming
- Coordinates: 43°50′59″N 104°11′34″W
- Architect: Sundstrom, Conrad; Thompson, Vince
- NRHP reference No.: 94000680
- Added to NRHP: July 07, 1994

The Wyoming Army National Guard Cavalry Stable in Newcastle, Wyoming was built between 1933 and 1936 for the Wyoming National Guard's horses. It is the last National Guard cavalry stable in Wyoming. It has been used as the Anna Miller Museum by the Weston County Historical Society since 1966.

== Anna Miller Museum ==
The Anna Miller Museums is a museum of local history, with exhibits about the area's pioneers, Native Americans and prehistoric history.

== Stable history ==
Funding for the stables was provided by the Depression-era Civil Works Administration and Works Progress Administration. The Newcastle National Guard unit was formed in 1899 as Company A, Second Regiment, Wyoming National Guard, becoming Company A of the Third Wyoming Infantry Regiment in 1905. In 1921 the Third Infantry Regiment was reorganized as the First Cavalry, finally becoming in 1942 Troop F, 115th Horse Mechanized Cavalry. Similar units with similar facilities existed in Sheridan, Douglas, Casper and Torrington.

The original plans for the stables included a 190-foot (58 m) by 75-foot (23 m) riding hall adjacent to the stables, using the same materials. Footings were started, but due to the onset of World War II the hall was never completed. Stone intended for the hall was appropriated for other local construction projects. Of the Wyoming units, only Torrington had a completed riding hall.

The one story building measures 31.5 feet (9.6 m) wide by 168 feet (51 m) long, with a rock-faced sandstone exterior. The walls are solid stone 18 inches (46 cm) thick, with the stone obtained from a quarry on Salt Creek. Stonework was by the Sundstrom Brothers, who also worked on the Weston County Courthouse.

The building was built with stables and a caretaker's residence within. Much of the interior has an open ceiling with the roof structure visible above. The roof structure is heavy timber trusses on 10-foot (3.0 m) centers.

The Wyoming Army National Guard Cavalry Stable was placed on the National Register of Historic Places in 1994.
