= United States Post Office (Kemmerer, Wyoming) =

- US Post Office--Kemmerer Main
- U.S. National Register of Historic Places
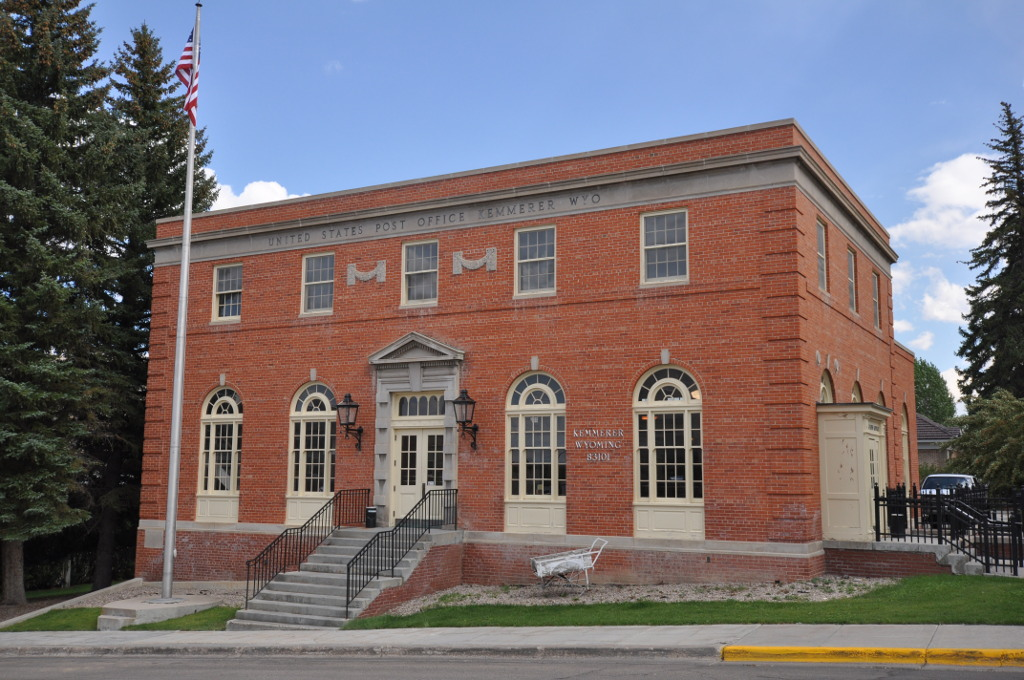

- Location within Wyoming Location within the United States
- Location: Sapphire Ave. and Cedar St., Kemmerer, Wyoming
- Coordinates: 41°47′40″N 110°32′18″W
- Built: 1934
- Architect: US Department of the Treasury; Simon, Louis A.
- Architectural style: Classical Revival
- MPS: Historic US Post Offices in Wyoming, 1900--1941, TR
- NRHP reference No.: 87000786
- Added to NRHP: May 19, 1987

The Kemmerer Main Post Office in Kemmerer, Wyoming was built in 1934 as part of a facilities improvement program by the United States Post Office Department. The post office in Kemmerer was nominated to the National Register of Historic Places as part of a thematic study comprising twelve Wyoming post offices built to standardized USPO plans in the early twentieth century.
