= Texas Trail Museum =

- Location within Wyoming
- Established: 1986
- Location: 201 West 3rd Street; Pine Bluffs, Wyoming, United States
- Coordinates: 41.181911°N 104.069619°W
- Type: History museum

The Texas Trail Museum is a museum housed in a building which was formerly the Power Plant/Fire House for the town of Pine Bluffs in Wyoming. The museum's mission is to preserve and restore the heritage of the Frontier crossroads area (Eastern Laramie County, Wyoming) for future generations, through displays and education.

== History ==
When first formed in 1986, needing a place to display artifacts, the Board negotiated with the Town of Pine Bluffs during the weeks leading up to the Town's centennial. On September 16, 1986, by Resolution 86-16, signed by Timothy T. Connor, Mayor and Dema Jo Gilbert, Clerk, the Town leased to the Texas Trail Museum: "... a non-profit organization in the state of Wyoming, a building known as the 'Old Power Plant,' situated on the northwest corner of Market Street and Third Street in the Town of Pine Bluffs, Wyoming for the sum of one dollar ($1.00) per year."

== Exhibits ==
The museum is a 4 1/2-acre complex, which includes:

- Main Exhibition Hall - includes Old West artifacts
- Agriculture and Transportation Building
- Saint Mary's Catholic Church
- Muddy Creek School, the first one-room schoolhouse in southeastern Laramie County
- Bowser Homestead Cottage, an example of how early homesteaders lived
- Railroad displays, including a Union Pacific Railroad caboose, a switchman's shack and a telegraph shed
- Brodine-Walker Boarding House, which had been run by local families who rented rooms to railroad crewmen between assignments and travelers

The museum complex displays artifacts of the 19th and 20th century, including a 1938 fire engine, twin diesel engines that provided electricity for Pine Bluffs from 1937–1960, a teepee of the type used by American Indians who inhabited the area around Pine Bluffs a century ago. Many teepee rings have been discovered in the Bluffs south of town.

There is a collection of artifacts depicting the history of southeastern Laramie County, by touring this 4-1/2 acre museum. The main exhibition hall has a gift shop, pre-historic artifacts, and displays reflecting the history of Pine Bluffs, Albin, Burns, Carpenter, and Egbert. Other buildings include the oldest school house in Laramie County, a de-commissioned Catholic church, the Brodine-Walker Boarding House, a Union Pacific Caboose with railroad memorabilia, the Bowser homestead house, and the Agriculture and Transportation building, featuring a display of Plains Indian artifacts, including a tipi for the kids to play in, an extensive barbed wire exhibit, and a 1938 Fire Truck used by the town of Pine Bluffs. Texas Trail Museum is located along the well known Lincoln Highway.The Texas Trail Museum is open seasonally, from May 1 to Sept 30th. Hours are Wednesday through Saturday 9:00 am to 4:00 pm, and Sunday 1:00 pm to 4:00 pm. They are closed Monday and Tuesday.

There is no entrance fee to the museum, but donations are greatly appreciated.
