= Hanna Basin Museum =

- Hanna Community Hall
- U.S. National Register of Historic Places
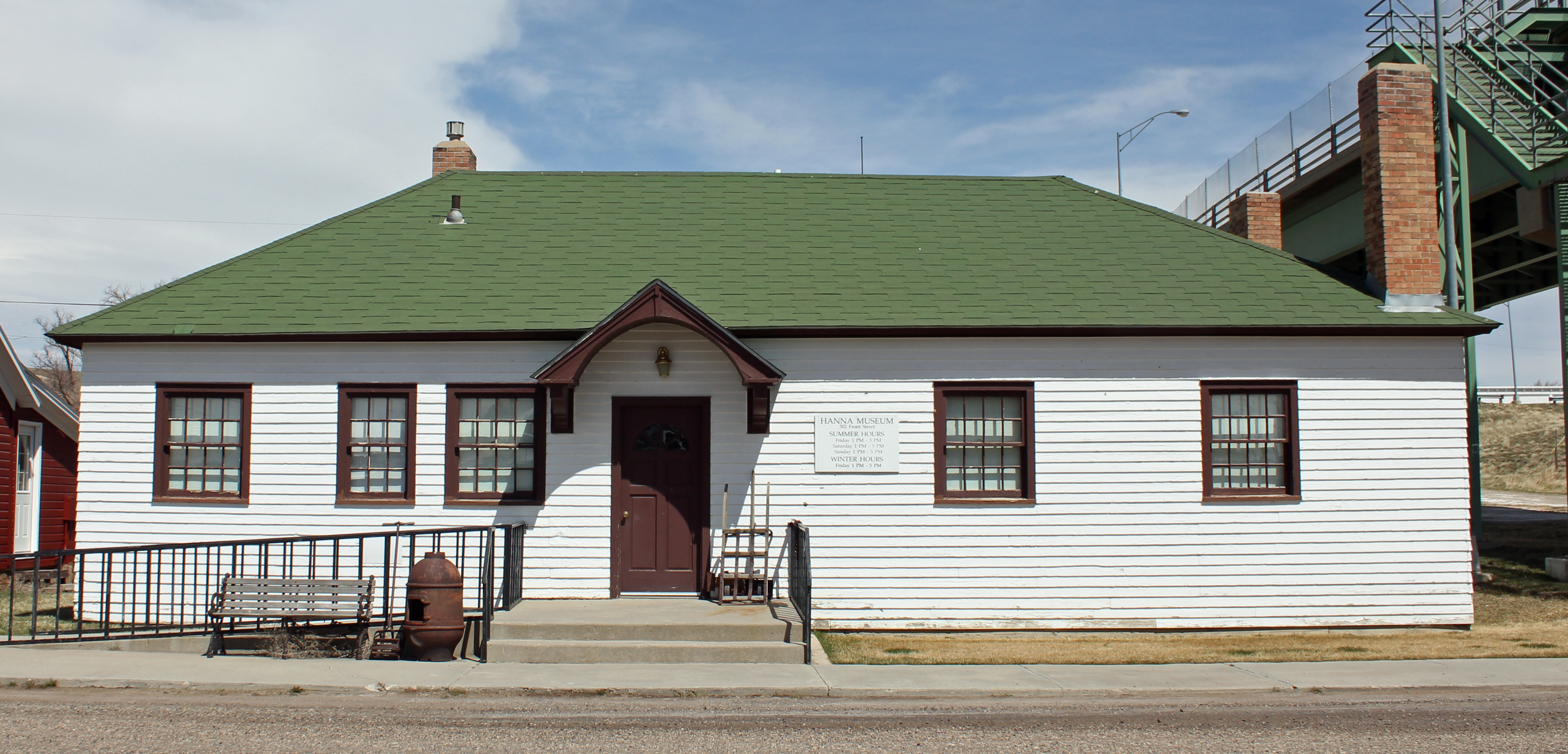
- Hanna Basin Museum in 2014

- Location within Wyoming
- Location: Front St., Hanna, Wyoming
- Coordinates: 41°52′9″N 106°33′51″W
- Area: less than one acre
- Built: 1890
- Built by: John Linden
- NRHP reference No.: 83004277
- Added to NRHP: November 26, 1983

The Hanna Community Hall, also known as Linden Hall and presently used as the Hanna Basin Museum, was built in 1890 in Hanna, Wyoming as a saloon by its proprietor John Linden to serve coal miners in the area. In 1981, he moved the saloon into the center of Hanna with the Union Pacific Coal Company's permission. When Prohibition was established it became a pool hall, operated by John Thomas After Thomas' accidental death in the 1920s it became the small town's community center. It was renovated in 1931 with company funding. The community hall is now the Hanna Basin Museum.

Located at the center of the town, it is a one-story frame structure covered in wood clapboards, with a hipped shingle roof. Two uneven extensions to the rear end in gables. Windows are double-hung 8-over-8 units. A small bracketed canopy with arched trim covers the main entrance.

The Hanna Community Hall was listed on the National Register of Historic Places on November 26, 1983.
