= First National Bank of Meeteetse =

- U.S. National Register of Historic Places
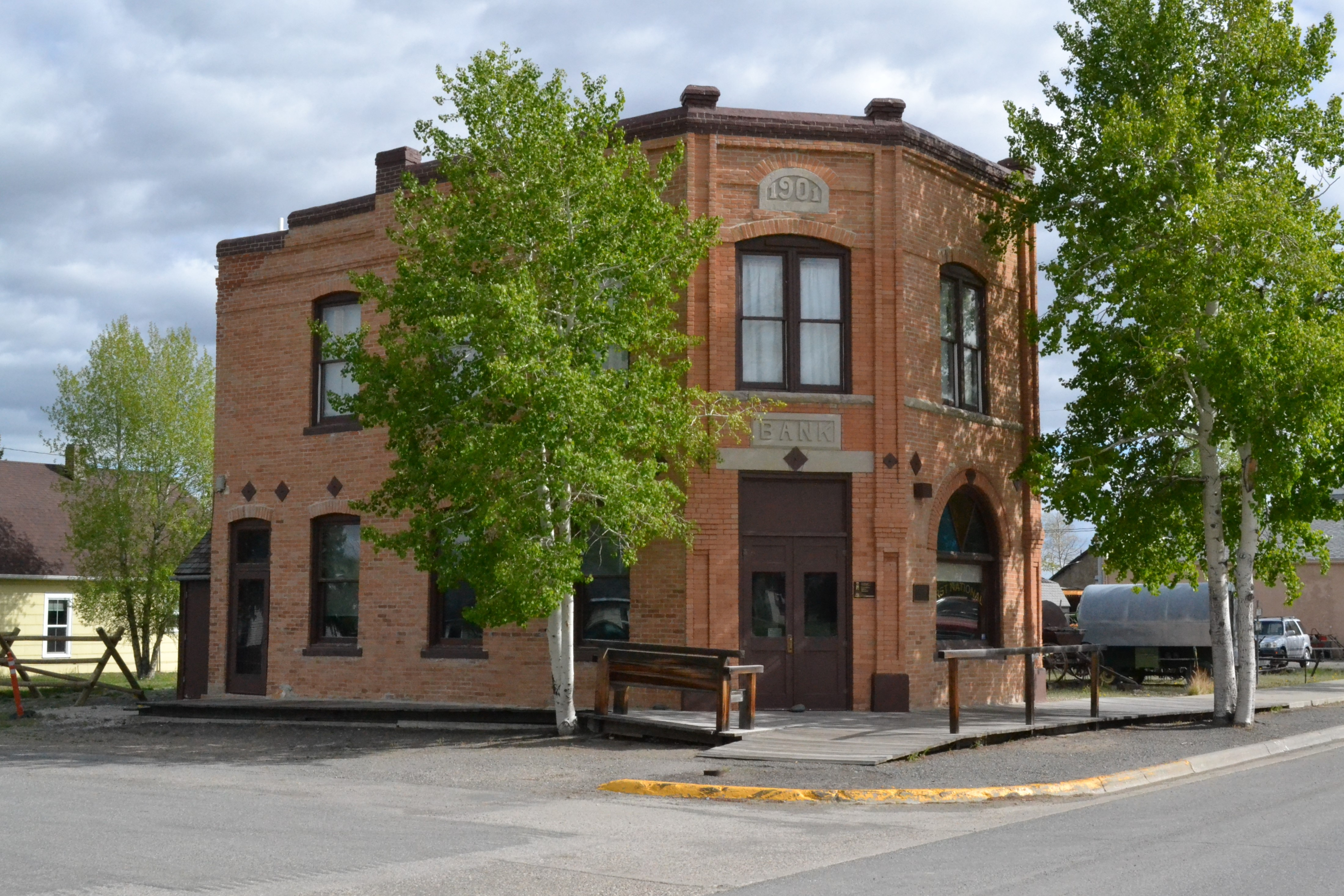

- Location within Wyoming Location within the United States
- Location: 1033 Park Ave., Meeteetse, Wyoming
- Coordinates: 44°9′25″N 108°52′21″W
- Built: 1901
- Architectural style: Late Victorian
- NRHP reference No.: 90001388
- Added to NRHP: September 05, 1990

The First National Bank of Meeteetse, also known as the Bank Museum and the Old Bank Building, was built in Meeteetse, Wyoming in 1901 for Hogg, Cheesman, McDonald and Company Bankers. The following year it was renamed to the more concise First National Bank of Meeteetse. The bank occupied the first floor while the second floor was initially the town council's meeting place.

The bank remained on the first floor until 1975. From 1975 the building operated as a museum, and was renovated in 1987 for that purpose. The two-story brick bank is located on a corner lot. The brick facade is accented by pilasters at the angled corner entrance and inset panels at the parapet level. Stained glass was used in the large arched window on the south side of the first floor and over the entry door. The east elevation formerly abutted another building and is entirely blank, while the north elevation is on an alley, with a wood stair to the second floor. The interior is restored according to historic photographs with the original teller's cage and the vault.
