= First National Bank of Rock River =

- U.S. National Register of Historic Places
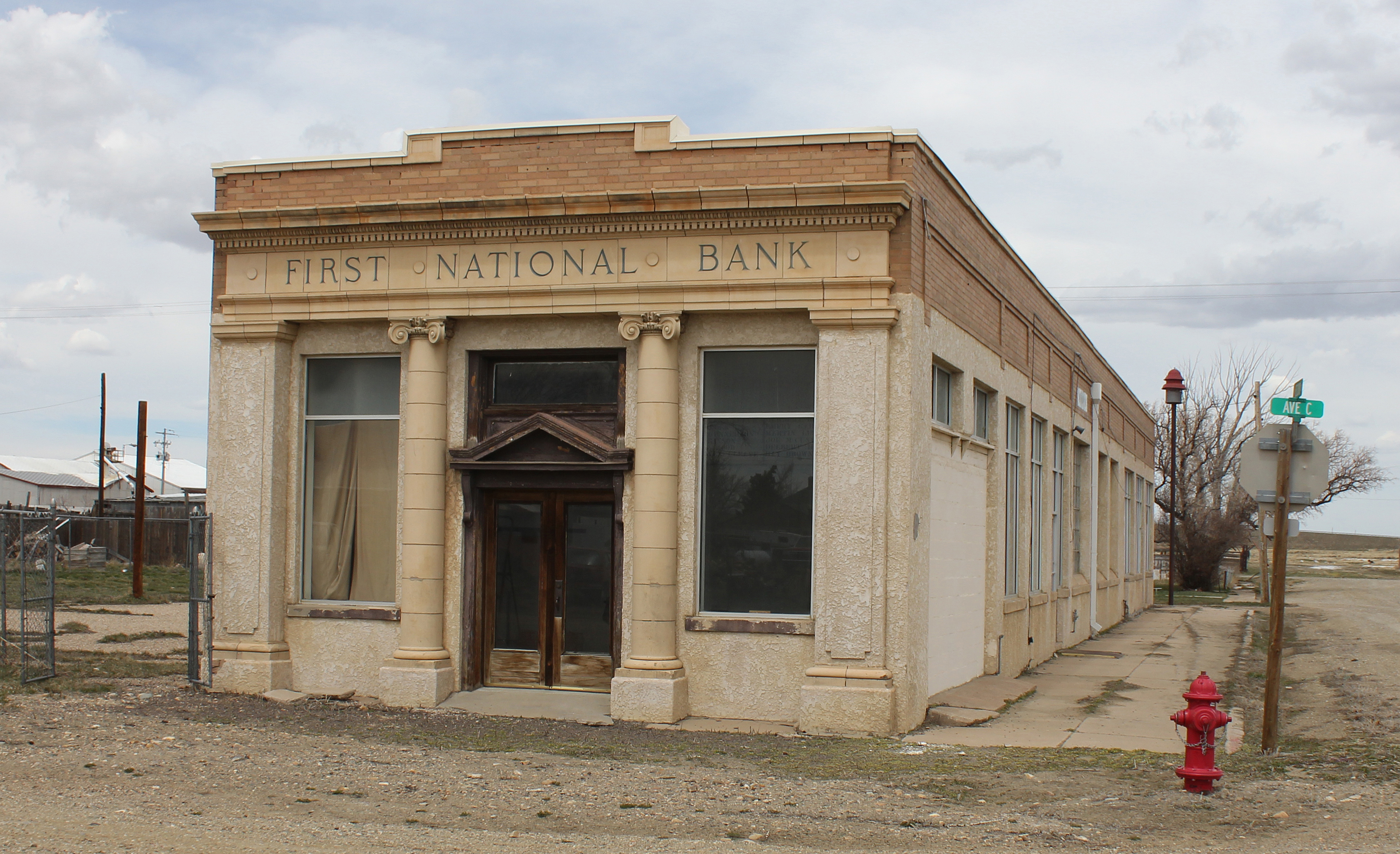
- First National Bank of Rock River in 2014

- Location within Wyoming Location within the United States
- Location: 131 Ave. C, Rock River, Wyoming
- Coordinates: 41°44′36.35″N 105°58′43″W
- Area: less than one acre
- Built: 1919
- Built by: Southern Wyoming Lumber Co.
- Architectural style: Classical Revival
- NRHP reference No.: 88002532
- Added to NRHP: November 21, 1988

The First National Bank of Rock River was built in 1919 in the small community of Rock River, Wyoming, at the peak of a local oil boom and operated from February 1920. The bank closed its doors on April 11, 1923 (The Wyoming State Journal (Lander), Volume 40, Number 16, April 20, 1923) as the oil boom collapsed and its vice president was convicted of embezzlement. The bank went into receivership on June 14, 1923, and its building sold to the new Citizen's State Bank, but was claimed by Albany County for back taxes in 1931. In 1936 the county sold the building to the town. It became a civic center for the town, operating a post office until the 1950s. A doctor's office had occupied the rear in the 1920s, and in the 1940s apartments were built, which later became the town's jail. With the departure of the post office the building became a fire station. From 1935 to 1985 the Council Room was used by civic organizations. From 1940 to 1985 another room was the town library.

The bank is a one-story brick building covered with stucco over much of the building below the parapet. The front is detailed with engaged Ionic classical columns and an entablature in terra cotta. The narrow end fronts Avenue C. The original vault remains, but most of the interior has been changed several times.

The bank was placed on the National Register of Historic Places on November 21, 1988.
