= Holy Name Catholic School =

- U.S. National Register of Historic Places
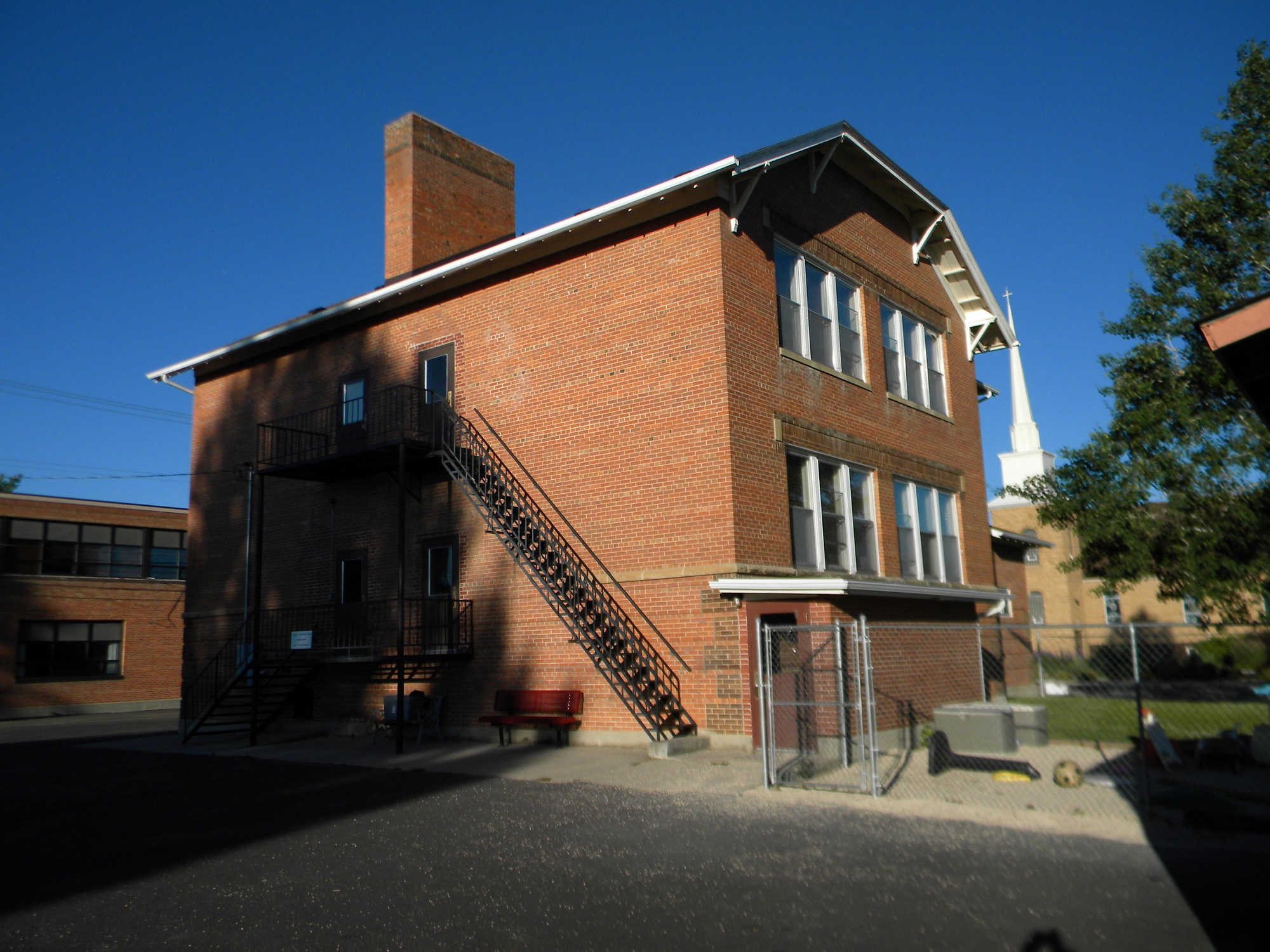

- Location within Wyoming Location within the United States
- Location: 121 S. Connor St., Sheridan, Wyoming
- Coordinates: 44°47′44″N 106°57′5″W
- Area: less than one acre
- Built: 1914
- Built by: Sheridan Construction & Milling Co. (1952 addition)
- Architect: Harrison L. Cook (1952 addition); Kenneth Schmidt and George Galida (1983 renovations)
- Architectural style: Bungalow/craftsman, Classical Revival, International style
- Website: holynamesheridan.org/school
- MPS: Educational Facilities in Wyoming, 1850-1960 MPS
- NRHP reference No.: 13000212
- Added to NRHP: April 23, 2013

The Holy Name Catholic School is a school and a historic school building located at 121 S. Connor Street in Sheridan, Wyoming. The school is one of the oldest Catholic schools in Wyoming, and its 1914 building is the oldest Catholic school building in the state. The original brick school building and a secondary annex building constructed in 1952 were listed on the National Register of Historic Places in 2013.

The school was opened in 1914, despite not being quite finished, under direction of Father John Duffy, the pastor of the parish. He had "requested sisters from the Sisters of Charity who lived at the Mother House in Leavenworth, Kansas. Three of the nuns rode the train from Kansas City; and after enduring the August heat arrived in Sheridan. As one of the sisters recalled, 'we opened in September, 1914, before the school was finished. The stairways were just boards lain across to make steps, but we opened at the appointed time.' There were four rooms used for classrooms of the eight grades and the fifth was used an apartment for the sisters. Everything stayed status quo throughout World War I, the Depression, and World War II for Holy Name Catholic School."

According to its 2013 National Register nomination, the 1914 school building

is a two-story, brick school building, which exhibits stylistic elements of the Bungalow/Craftsman and Classical Revival styles. The eclectic nature of the building's architecture is typical of Wyoming town schools of the late 19th and early 20th centuries.... The school building follows the "Quincy Plan" in layout, with self-contained classrooms for each grade (or in this case shared grades), with a desk for the teacher and rows of desks for students. Built just before the start of the Progressive era in Wyoming education (1915-1930), Holy Name School can be compared with many of the second and third generation grade schools in Wyoming, which tended to be larger than the earlier schools, two stories in height and constructed of brick or stone with restrained elements of architectural style. / Since no particular architect has been identified with this school, it is likely that the school building committee drew upon the many pattern books that were available for all types of buildings during the late 19th and early 20th century, including homes, barns, churches, banks and libraries as well as schools. The building committee might also have drawn from the bulletins and circulars produced by the Wyoming Board of Education. Exterior features of schools of this period include brick or masonry construction with large double-hung windows with articulated lintels and sills. Elementary schools of this period were especially designed to be more "homelike" and comfortable for younger children, incorporating elements of the Prairie and Craftsman styles. With its clipped side gables and bracketed eaves, Holy Name School fits into this category.

The 1952 annex provided a gymnasium and additional classrooms. It "was designed by Sheridan architect Harrison L. Cook in a modernist style in keeping with architectural trends of the period, and a marked departure from earlier schools. As noted in the MPDF, schools built during this period generally lack ornamentation or references to architectural styles of the past and tend to resemble commercial and industrial buildings of the period, rather than the previous generation of school buildings. They are horizontal in emphasis, with flat roofs, windows in sets or ribbons, generally faced in brick and stone or concrete. Interiors utilize new materials such as glazed tiles on the walls, linoleum-tile floors and acoustical tile ceilings."

In 2013 the buildings were deemed significant for NRHP listing according to requirements established for the historic merit of urban schools in Wyoming as defined in a 2010 study, "Educational Facilities in Wyoming", conducted by the Wyoming State Historic Preservation Office.

In 2023 the school offers schooling from pre-kindergarten (for ages 3–5) and kindergarten up to the sixth grade.
