= Wyoming Mercantile =

- U.S. National Register of Historic Places
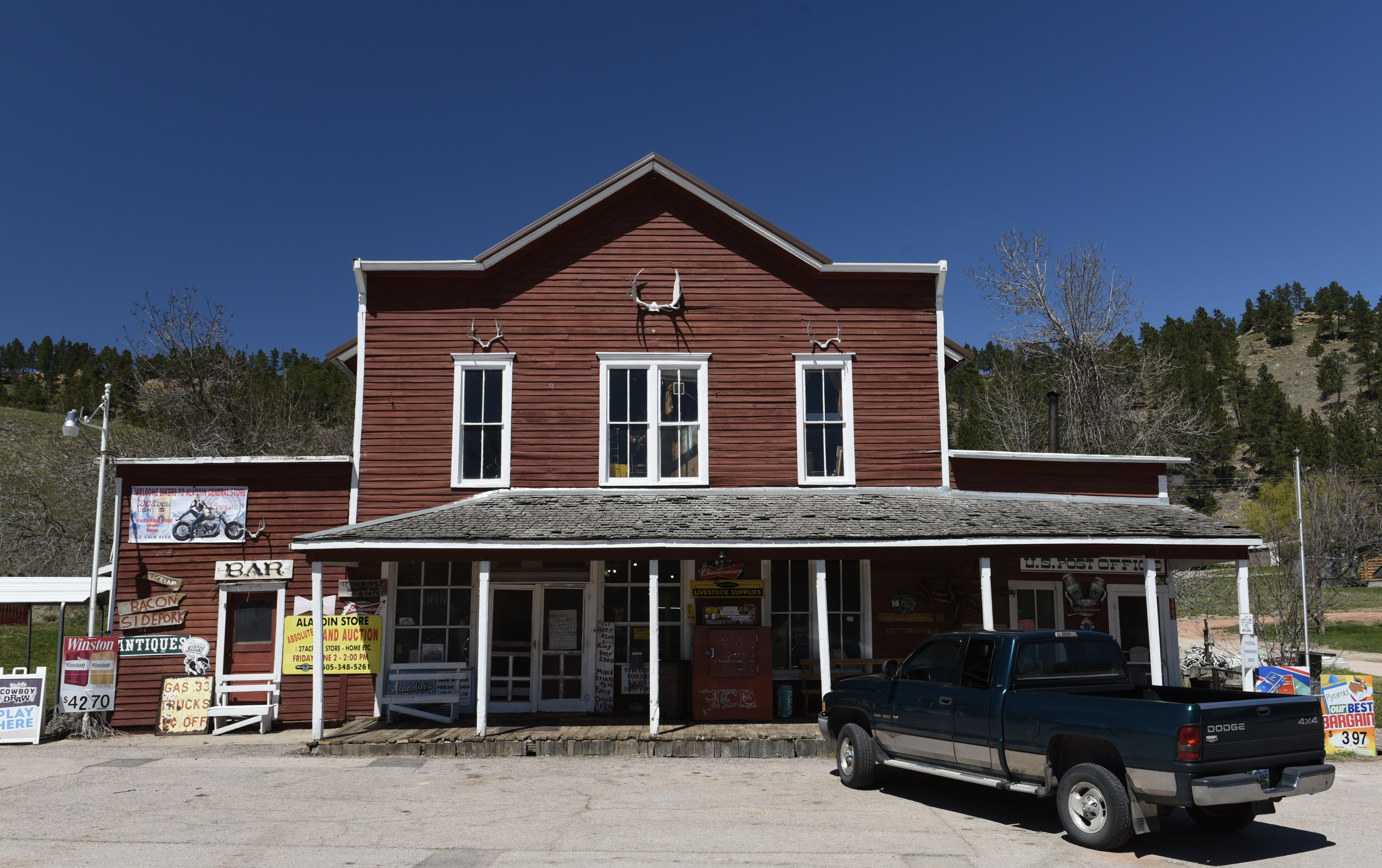

- Location within Wyoming Location within the United States
- Location: WY 24; Aladdin, Wyoming
- Coordinates: 44°38′25″N 104°11′1″W
- Area: less than one acre
- Architect: Robinson, Amos
- Architectural style: Victorian Era Commercial
- NRHP reference No.: 91000435
- Added to NRHP: April 16, 1991

Wyoming Mercantile, also known as the Aladdin General Store, is a preserved small-town general store in Aladdin, Wyoming. The store, which remains in operation, was built in 1896 by Amos Robinson as Wyoming Mercantile. Robinson died the same year, and the store went to Mahlon S. Kemmerer, who placed his properties, including the Wyoming and Missouri Valley Railroad, under the Wyoming Mercantile umbrella. Railroading continued until 1927. The store has continued, serving as a post office, bar, freight station and gas station.

The wood framed store consists of a two-story gabled main section with a one-story shed addition on the left side. The gable is covered by a squared false front that hides most of the main gable and all of the shed. A light roofed porch spans the front of the ground floor. The interior of the ground floor consists of five rooms: the general store, liquor store, post office, store room, and the addition, which is also used for storage. The walls and ceiling in the post office are covered with matchstick paneling, while the counter is matchstick paneled in the store. The store retains its original fixtures. The addition is a plain enclosure with dirt floors and no interior cladding. Upstairs are five rooms and a hallway, all with plaster walls, all used for storage.

The population of Aladdin, never much more than 50, has declined to about twelve. The store still serves the community.

The town of Kemmerer, Wyoming was named after Mahlon Kemmerer.

The Aladdin General Store was listed on the National Register of Historic Places in 1991.
