= Otho C. Jewett =

American architect

- Born: 1852; Des Moines, Iowa, U.S.
- Died: April 6, 1902 (aged 49–50); Deadwood, South Dakota, U.S.
- Resting place: Mount Moriah Cemetery
- Occupation: Architect
- Relatives: Samuel J. Kirkwood (uncle)

Otho C. Jewett (1852 - April 6, 1902) was an American architect. Born in Iowa, he designed many buildings in South Dakota, and he was described as "one of the best architects in the West" by The Daily Deadwood Pioneer-Times.

== Life ==
Born in Des Moines, Iowa, he was educated and trained as an architect in his home state. His uncle, Samuel J. Kirkwood, served as the 5th and 9th Governor of Iowa, and later as Senator and as the 14th United States Secretary of the Interior.

Jewett became an architect South Dakota, where he first designed buildings in Aberdeen, Chamberlain, and Pierre. From 1897 to his death, he designed buildings in Deadwood. According to his obituary in The Daily Deadwood Pioneer-Times, Jewett was "one of the best architects in the West."

Jewett died on April 6, 1902, in Deadwood. He was buried in Mount Moriah Cemetery.
