= Main Post Office, Kraków =

Building in Kraków, Poland

Coordinates: 50°03′34″N 19°56′34″E

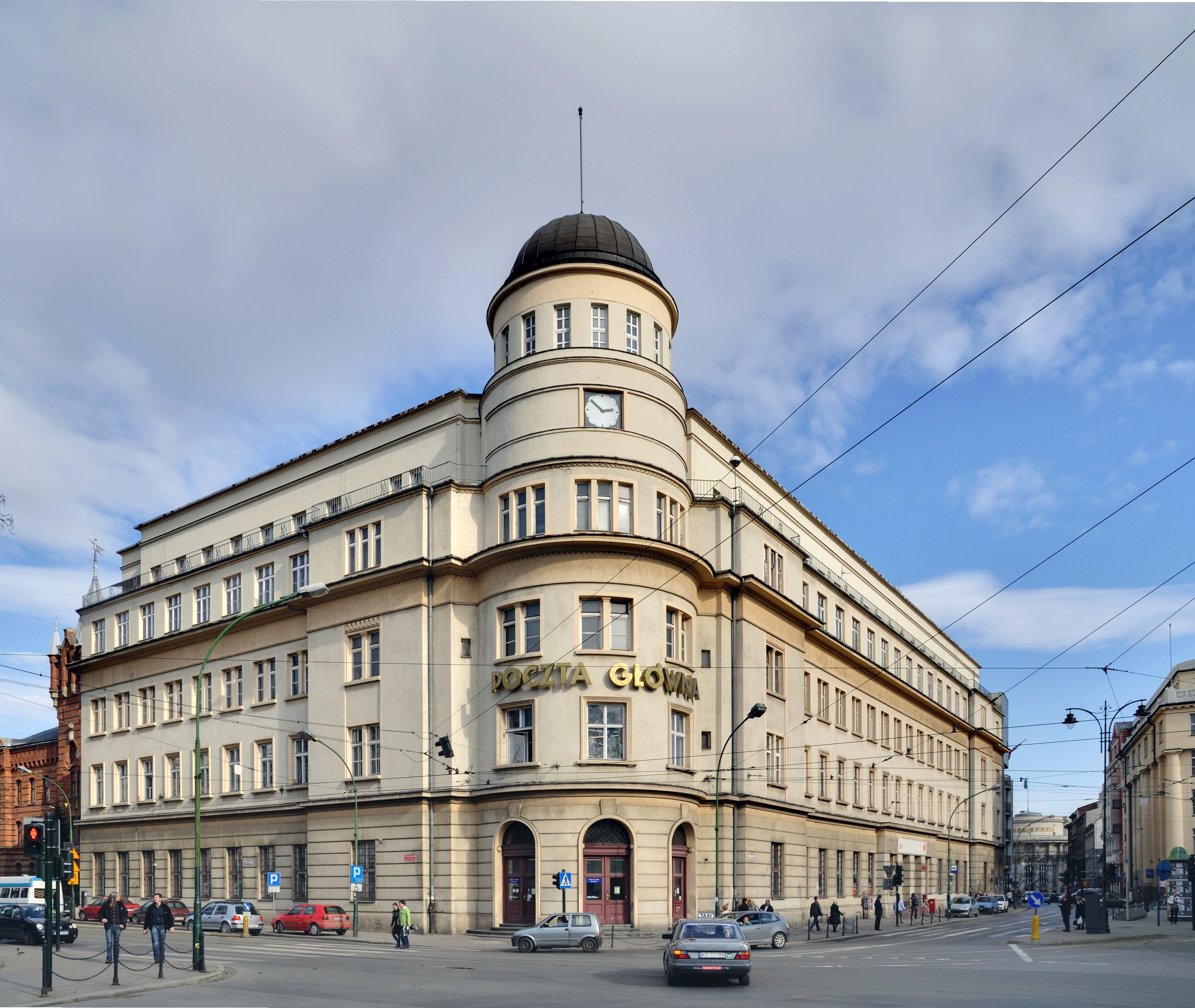
Main Post Office in Kraków

The Main Post Office in Kraków (Polish: Poczta Główna w Krakowie) is a building of the Polish Post located at the corner of Wielopole 2 and Westerplatte 20 streets in Kraków.

The building was designed by the Viennese architect F. Setz. Joseph Sareg adapted the project and it was built between 1887 and 1889 by Charles Knaus and Tadeusz Stryjeński.

Since 1899 it was the headquarters of mail in Kraków. In 1909, it was the location of what is now the Polish automatic telephone exchange with a capacity of 3600 numbers.

Due to growing needs for office surface, between 1930 and 1931 it was rebuilt by Frederick Tadaniera. The interiors and furnishings were updated and in 1933 the intercity telephone exchange was installed.

Another reconstruction took place during the German occupation. The Polish Post Office reopened on January 22, 1945.

After the war, the post office has repeatedly being modernized and repaired. Since 1991 it has housed the Polish Post and Telecommunications.

== Modern Development ==
the Building is currently undergoing development into a Luxury Hotel
