= United States Post Office (Powell, Wyoming) =

- US Post Office--Powell Main
- U.S. National Register of Historic Places
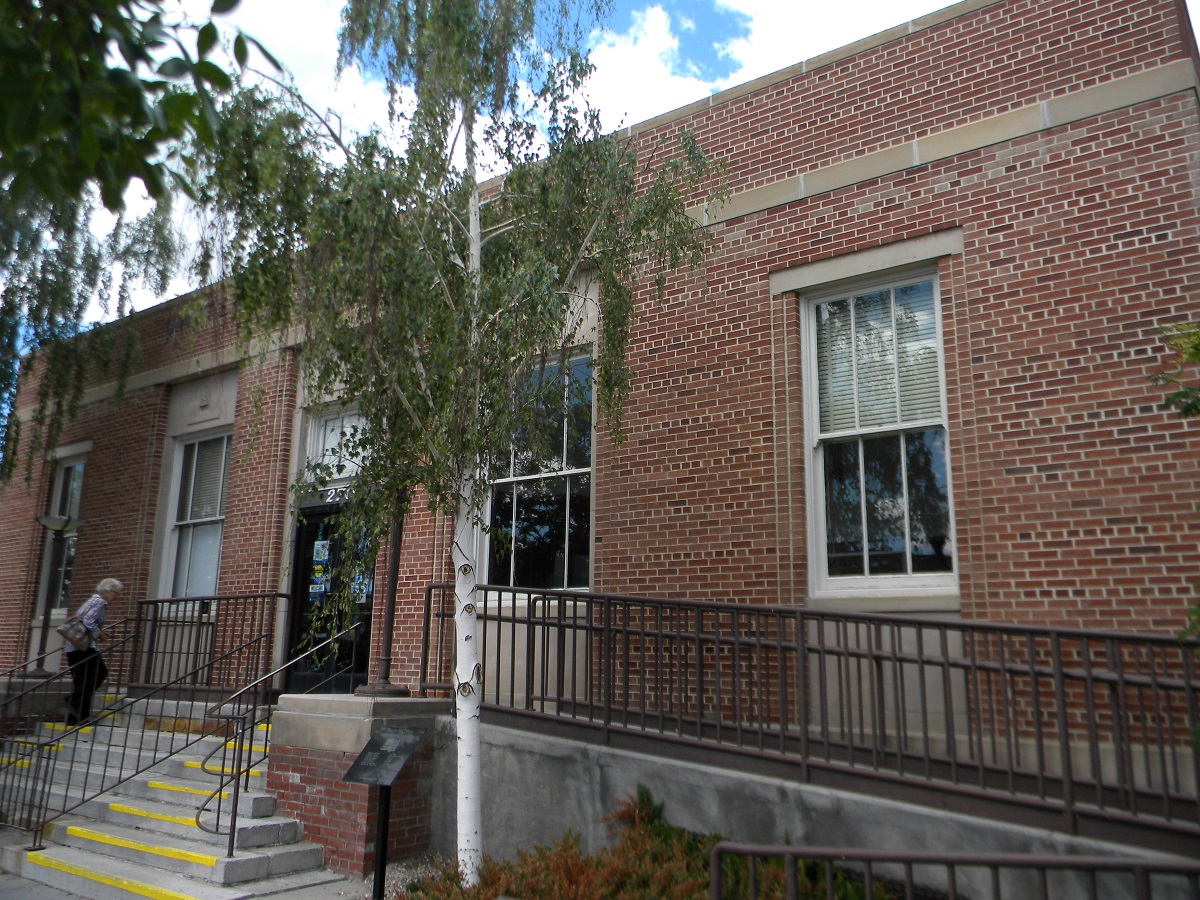
- Main entrance from Bent Street

- Location within Wyoming Location within the United States
- Location: 270 N. Bent St., Powell, Wyoming
- Coordinates: 44°45′19″N 108°45′28.5″W
- Built: 1937
- Architect: Louis A. Simon; Verona Burkhard
- MPS: Historic US Post Offices in Wyoming, 1900--1941, TR
- NRHP reference No.: 87000787
- Added to NRHP: May 22, 1987

The Powell Main Post Office in Powell, Wyoming, was built in 1937 as part of a facilities improvement program by the United States Post Office Department. The post office in Powell was nominated to the National Register of Historic Places as part of a thematic study comprising twelve Wyoming post offices built to standardized USPO plans in the early twentieth century.

The post office contains the mural, Powell's Agriculture Resulting from the Shoshine Irrigation Project by Verona Burkhard, painted in 1938 and funded by the Section of Painting and Sculpture.
