= United States Post Office–Green River =

- US Post Office-Green River
- U.S. National Register of Historic Places
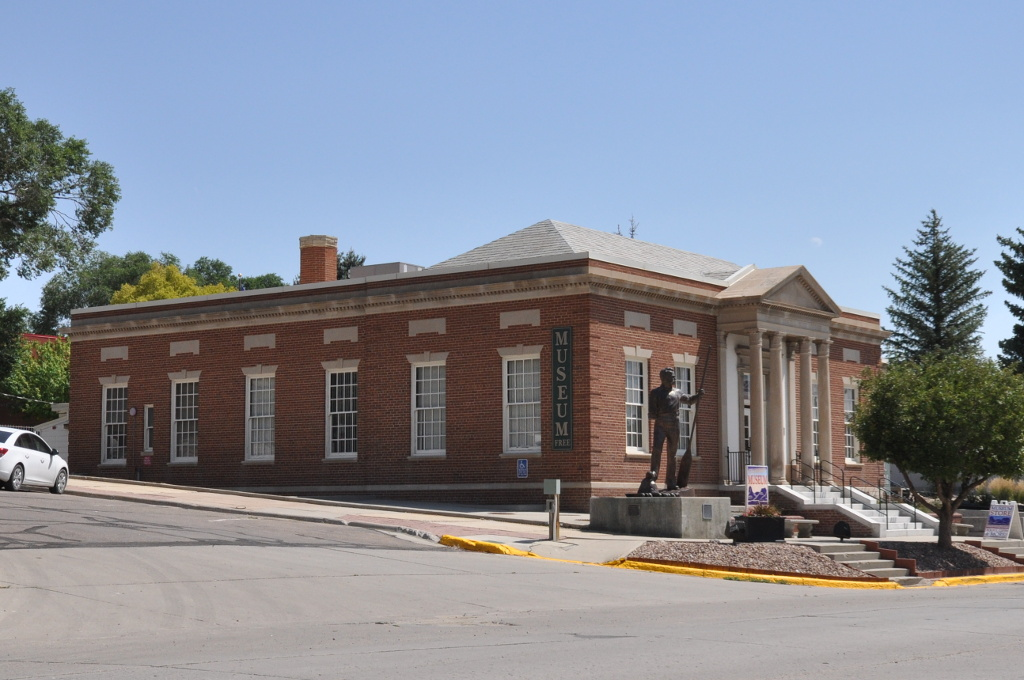

- Location within Wyoming Location within the United States
- Location: 3 W. Flaming Gorge Way, Green River, Wyoming
- Coordinates: 41°31′45″N 109°28′1.5″W
- Area: 0.4 acres (0.16 ha)
- Built: 1931
- Architect: Wetmore, James A.; Thomsen, Hyrum C.
- Architectural style: Classical Revival
- MPS: Historic US Post Offices in Wyoming, 1900--1941, TR
- NRHP reference No.: 97001535
- Added to NRHP: December 11, 1997

The former U.S. Post Office-Green River is a Classical Revival architecture building designed by James Wetmore and Thomas Hyrum in Green River, Wyoming that was built in 1931. It was built under the Elliot Act, a pre-New Deal economic recovery plan. In 1967, the building was repurposed and is now Sweetwater County Historical Museum. It was listed on the National Register of Historic Places in 1997. Its 1997 listing included alternative name Trudel's Restaurante.
