= Buffalo Main Post Office =

- US Post Office--Buffalo Main
- U.S. National Register of Historic Places
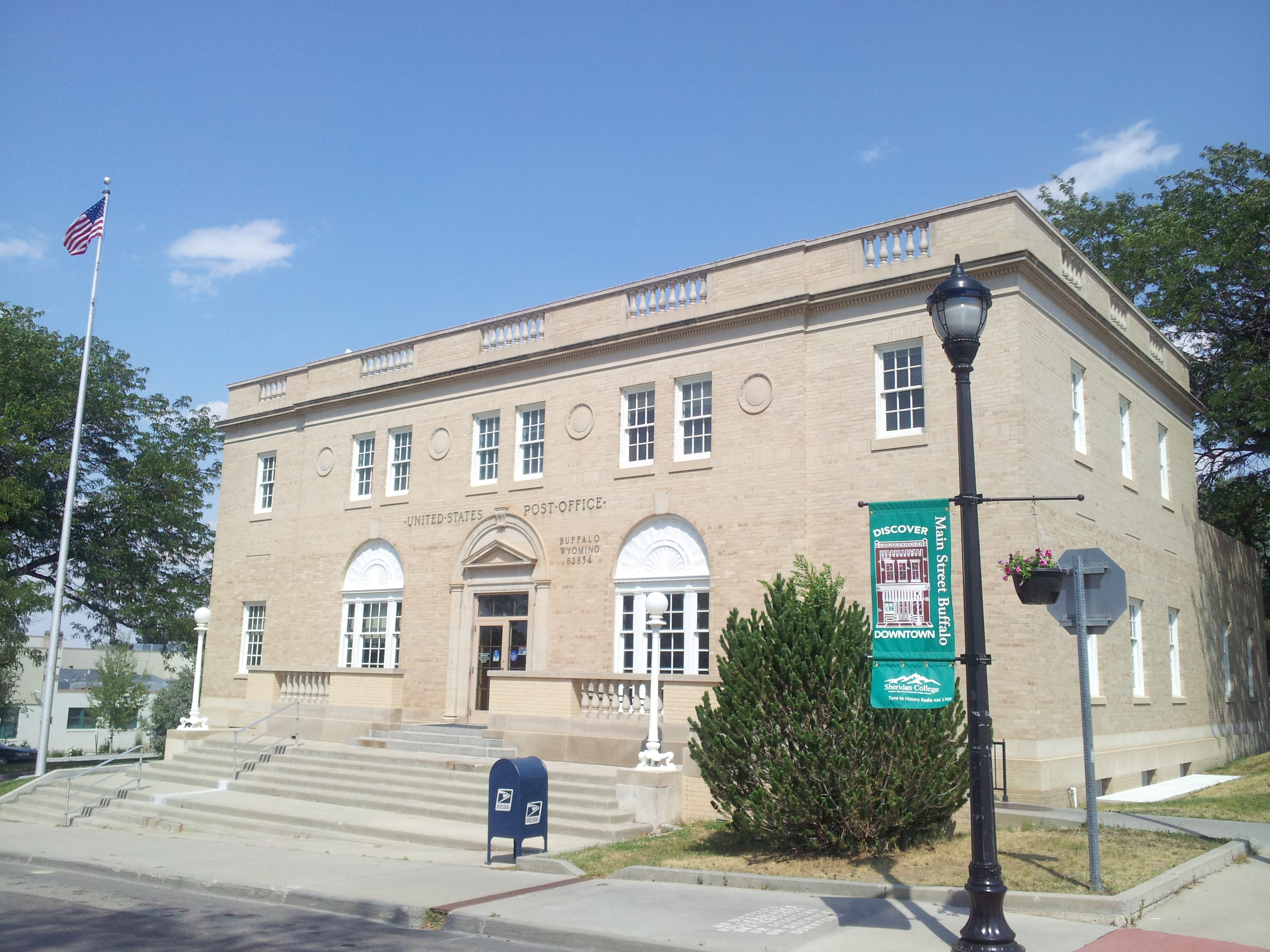
- US Post Office, Buffalo, Wyoming

- Location within Wyoming Location within the United States
- Location: 193 S. Main St., Buffalo, Wyoming
- Coordinates: 44°20′42″N 106°41′49″W
- Built: 1911
- Architect: US Department of the Treasury; Office of Supervising Architect
- Architectural style: Classical Revival
- MPS: Historic US Post Offices in Wyoming, 1900--1941, TR
- NRHP reference No.: 87000785
- Added to NRHP: May 19, 1987

The Buffalo Main Post Office in Buffalo, Wyoming was built in 1911 as part of a facilities improvement program by the United States Post Office Department. The post office in Buffalo was nominated to the National Register of Historic Places as part of a thematic study comprising twelve Wyoming post offices built to standardized USPO plans in the early twentieth century.
