= United States Post Office (Douglas, Wyoming) =

- US Post Office--Douglas Main
- U.S. National Register of Historic Places
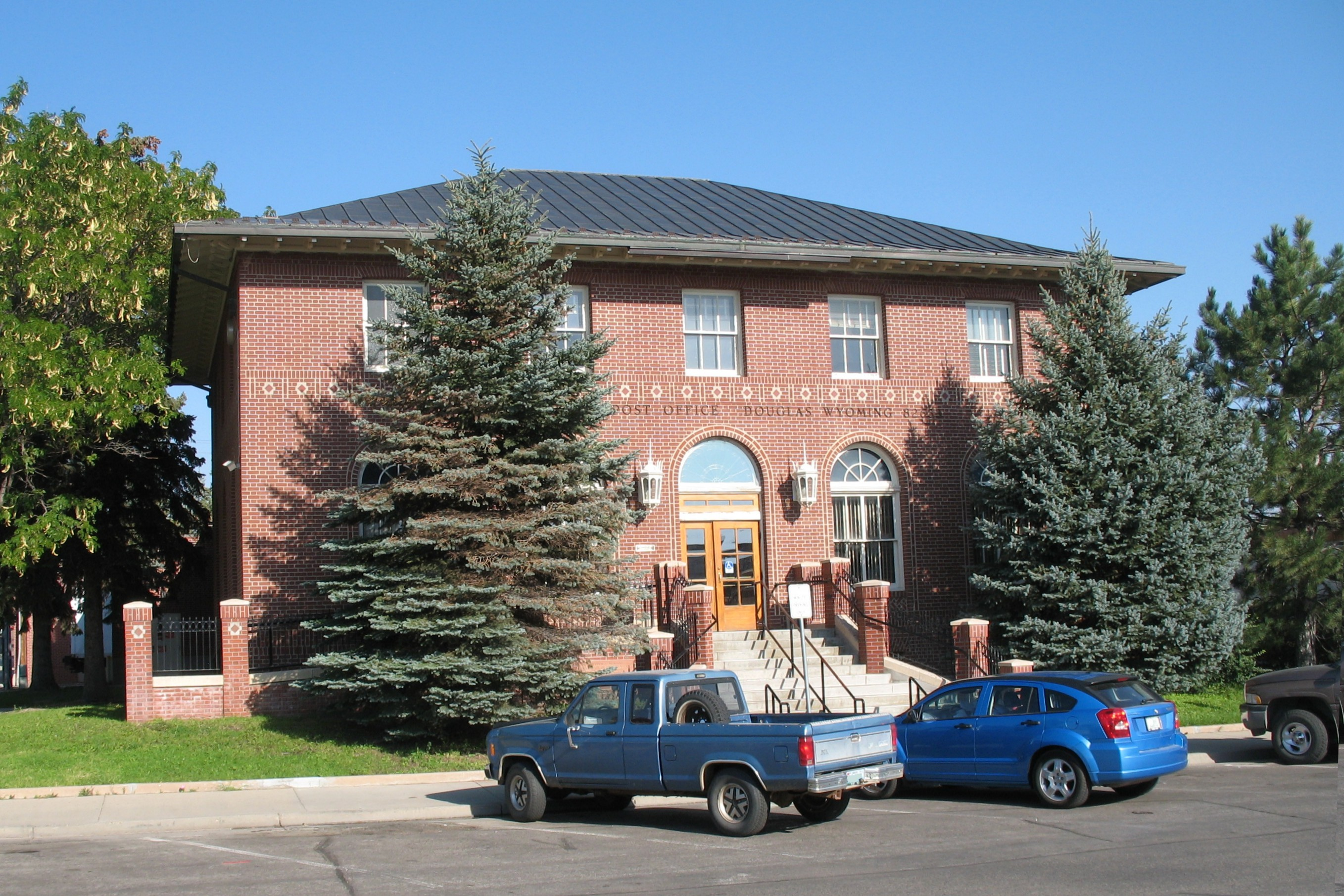

- Location within Wyoming Location within the United States
- Location: 129 N. Third St., Douglas, Wyoming
- Coordinates: 42°45′38″N 105°22′59″W
- Built: 1915-1916
- Architect: US Department of the Treasury; Wenderoth, Oscar
- Architectural style: Classical Revival
- MPS: Historic US Post Offices in Wyoming, 1900--1941, TR
- NRHP reference No.: 87000781
- Added to NRHP: May 19, 1987

The Douglas Main Post Office in Douglas, Wyoming, United States, was built in 1909 as part of a facilities improvement program by the United States Post Office Department. The post office in Douglas was nominated to the National Register of Historic Places as part of a thematic study comprising twelve Wyoming post offices built to standardized USPO plans in the early twentieth century.
