= Thermopolis Main Post Office =

- US Post Office--Thermopolis Main
- U.S. National Register of Historic Places
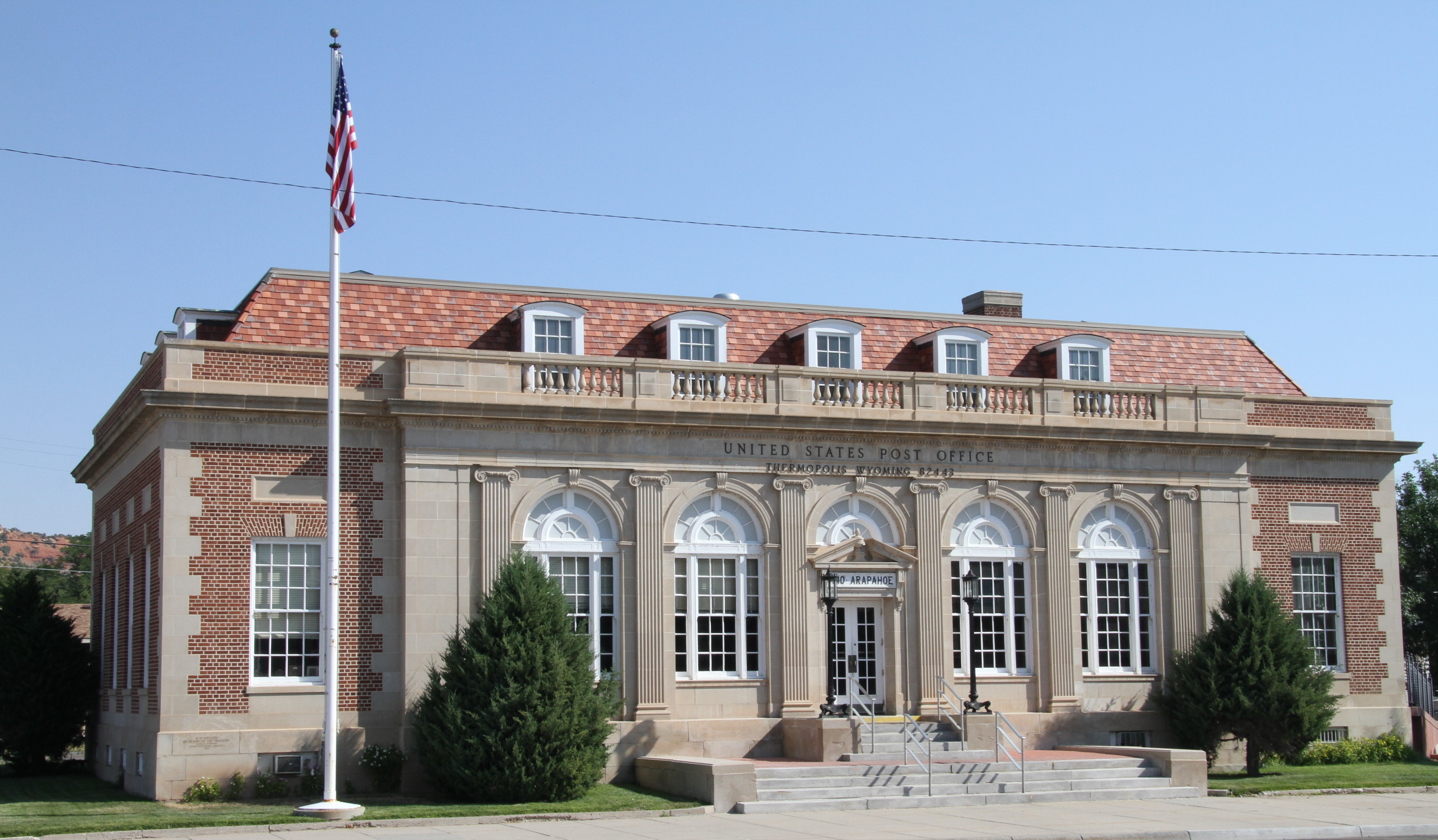
- The building in 2017

- Location within Wyoming Location within the United States
- Location: 440 Arapahoe Street, Thermopolis, Wyoming
- Coordinates: 43°38′51″N 108°12′33″W
- Built: 1933
- Architect: US Department of the Treasury; Office of Supervising Architect
- Architectural style: Classical Revival
- MPS: Historic US Post Offices in Wyoming, 1900--1941, TR
- NRHP reference No.: 87000784
- Added to NRHP: May 19, 1987

The Thermopolis Main Post Office in Thermopolis, Wyoming was built as part of a facilities improvement program by the United States Post Office Department. The post office in Thermopolis was nominated to the National Register of Historic Places as part of a thematic study comprising twelve Wyoming post offices built to standardized USPO plans in the early twentieth century.
