= United States Post Office (Greybull, Wyoming) =

- US Post Office--Greybull Main
- U.S. National Register of Historic Places
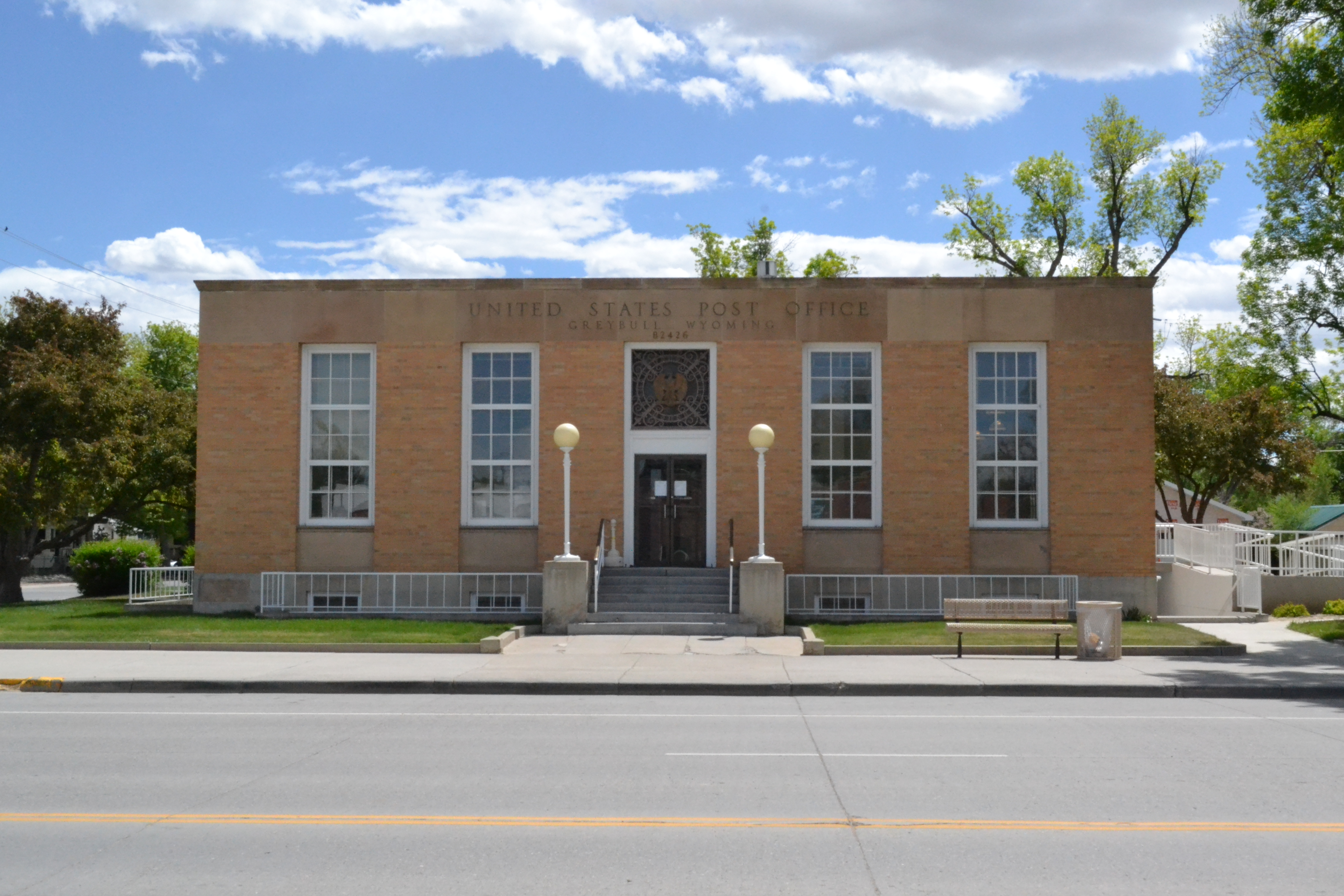

- Location within Wyoming Location within the United States
- Location: 401 Greybull Ave., Greybull, Wyoming
- Coordinates: 44°29′19″N 108°3′10.4″W
- Built: 1937
- Architect: Louis A. Simon, Manuel A. Bromberg
- MPS: Historic US Post Offices in Wyoming, 1900--1941, TR
- NRHP reference No.: 87000780
- Added to NRHP: May 22, 1987

The Greybull Main Post Office in Greybull, Wyoming, United States, was built in 1937 as part of a facilities improvement program by the United States Post Office Department. The post office in Greybull was nominated to the National Register of Historic Places as part of a thematic study comprising twelve Wyoming post offices built to standardized USPO plans in the early twentieth century. It is one of five post offices in the state with Section of Painting and Sculpture artwork, symbolizing the extensive New Deal public works and federal presence benefiting small communities.
