= Weston County Courthouse =

- U.S. National Register of Historic Places
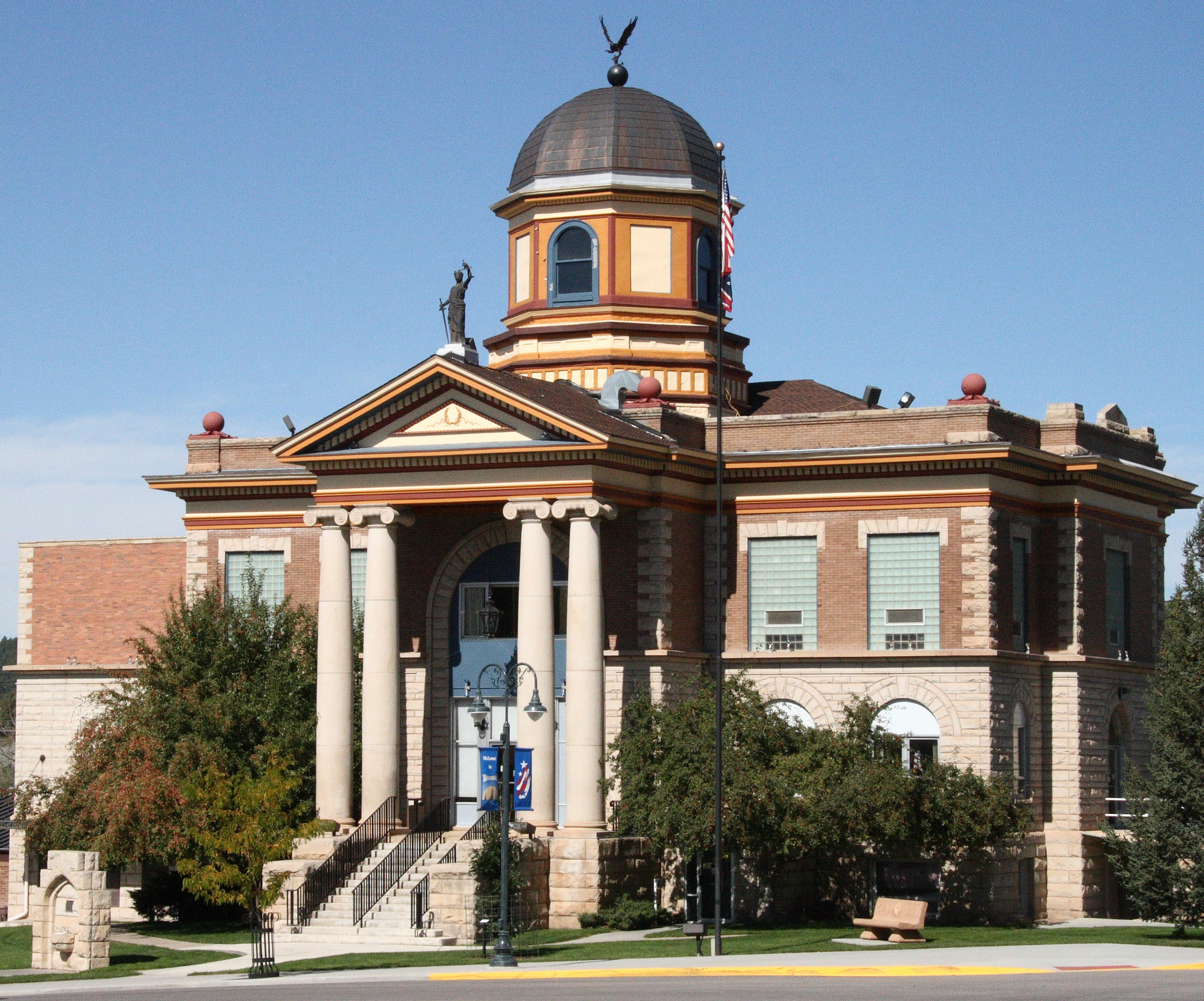

- Location within Wyoming Location within the United States
- Interactive map showing the location of Weston County Courthouse
- Location: Newcastle, Wyoming
- Coordinates: 43°51′28″N 104°12′9″W
- Built: 1910
- Built by: M. J. Williams
- Architect: Charles A. Randall
- Architectural style: Renaissance, Beaux Arts
- NRHP reference No.: 01000930
- Added to NRHP: September 1, 2001

The Weston County Courthouse in Newcastle, Wyoming, was designed by Charles A. Randall and built in 1910–11. The Beaux-Arts style courthouse is the most elaborate building in Newcastle, and a symbol of the community's prosperity at the time of its construction.

The courthouse features a two-story central pavilion supported by paired Ionic columns supporting an entablature and pediment. The parapet is ornamented by galvanized metal globes with a statue of Justice on the top of the pediment. An octagonal cupola with arched windows crowns the building. A renovation has replaced the original doors with aluminum-framed units, infilled many windows with glass block and closed the cupola windows with wood panels.

Construction of the courthouse was attended by difficulties with contracting. The first contractor was fired and replaced by John L. Sundstrom, Oscar Linden, Carl Sjostrum and Robert Linden with experience in stonemasonry. Work was complete in 1911, in time for a visit in October and an address from the courthouse steps by U.S. President Theodore Roosevelt .

A three-story wing dedicated as a war memorial was added on the west side of the building in 1953. The addition uses sandstone for the first two stories and brick for the upper floor to match the main building.

The Weston County Courthouse resembles another Randall-designed courthouse, the Butte County, South Dakota Courthouse. The Weston County Courthouse was placed on the National Register of Historic Places in 2001.
