= United States Post Office (Newcastle, Wyoming) =

- US Post Office--Newcastle Main
- U.S. National Register of Historic Places
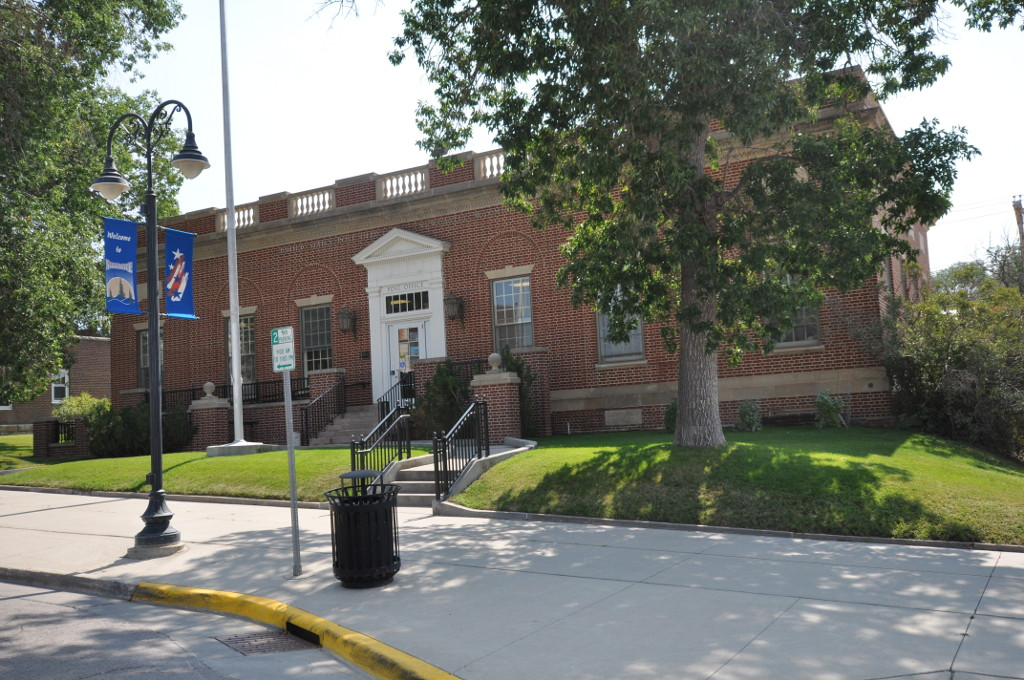

- Location within Wyoming Location within the United States
- Location: W. Main St. and Sumner Ave., Newcastle, Wyoming
- Coordinates: 43°51′19″N 104°12′8″W
- Built: 1932
- Architect: US Department of the Treasury; Office of Supervising Architect
- Architectural style: Classical Revival
- MPS: Historic US Post Offices in Wyoming, 1900--1941, TR
- NRHP reference No.: 87000791
- Added to NRHP: May 19, 1987

The Newcastle Main Post Office is a historic post office building in Newcastle, Wyoming. Built in 1932, it was constructed as part of a facilities improvement program by the United States Post Office Department. The post office in Newcastle was nominated to the National Register of Historic Places as part of a thematic study comprising twelve Wyoming post offices built to standardized USPO plans in the early twentieth century.
