= Newcastle, Wyoming =

- City
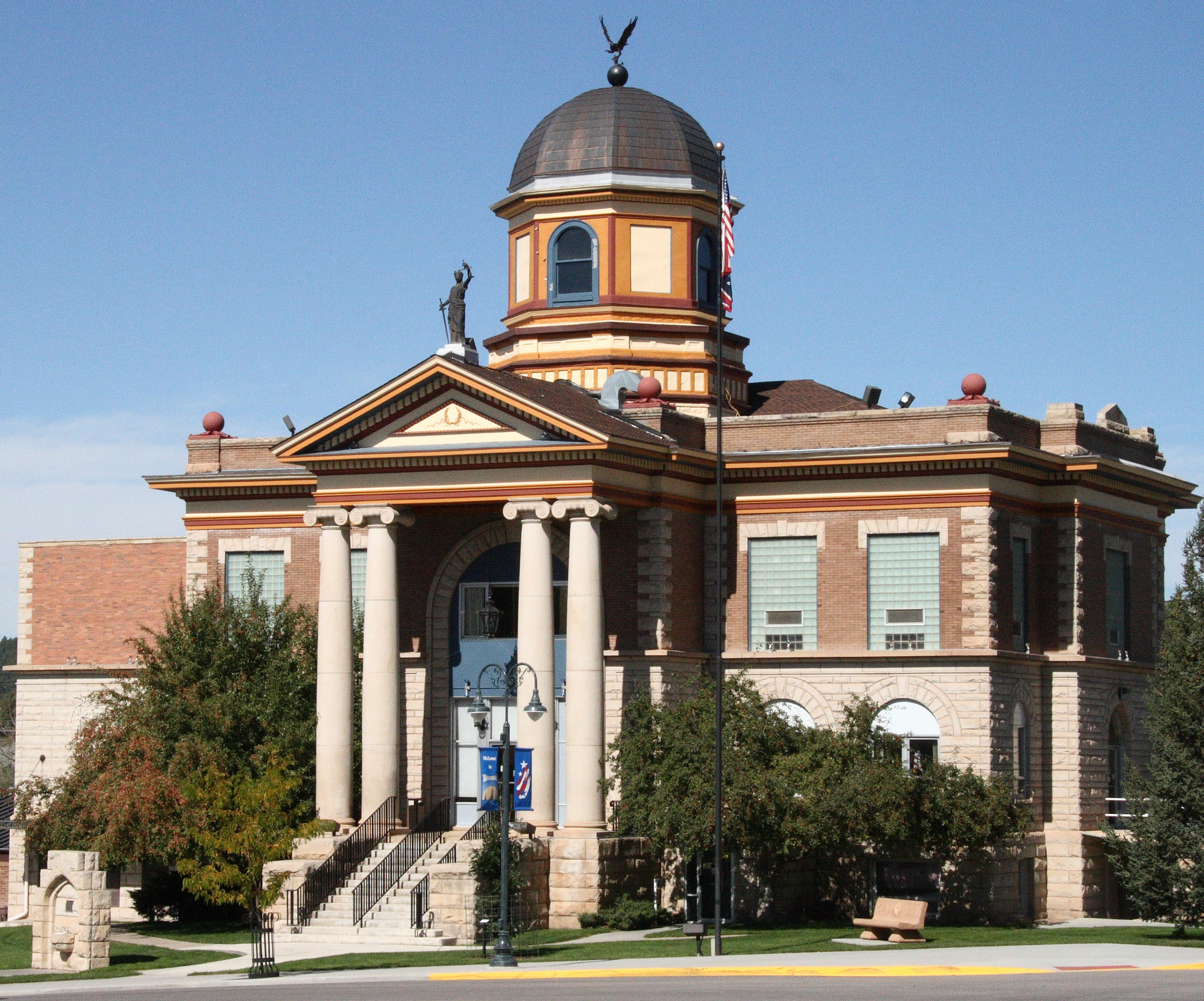
- Weston County Courthouse in Newcastle

- Seal

- Location of Newcastle in Weston County, Wyoming
- Coordinates: 43°51′26″N 104°12′34″W
- Country: United States
- State: Wyoming
- County: Weston

Area
  - Total: 2.56 sq mi (6.63 km^{2})
  - Land: 2.56 sq mi (6.63 km^{2})
  - Water: 0 sq mi (0.00 km^{2})
- Elevation: 4,327 ft (1,319 m)

Population (2020)
  - Total: 3,374
  - Density: 1,326.4/sq mi (512.12/km^{2})
- Time zone: UTC-7 (Mountain (MST))
  - Summer (DST): UTC-6 (MDT)
- ZIP codes: 82701, 82715
- Area code: 307
- FIPS code: 56-56215
- GNIS feature ID: 2411244
- Website: Official website

Newcastle is a city in and the county seat of Weston County, Wyoming, United States. The population was 3,374 at the 2020 census.

== Geography ==
Newcastle is situated at the southwest edge of the Black Hills, at the intersection of U.S. routes 16 and 85.

According to the United States Census Bureau, the city has a total area of 2.55 square miles (6.60 km^{2}), all land.

== History ==
Newcastle was founded in 1889 as a mining town and a railroad town as the Chicago, Burlington and Quincy Railroad expanded westward. It is named after Newcastle-Upon-Tyne, England, an important coal shipping port. President Teddy Roosevelt visited Newcastle in 1903.

U.S. Route 85 once ran south from the city to the east of the rail track, crossing them over a five span wide flange steel girder bridge constructed in 1929. The portion of US Hwy 85 from Newcastle to just south of the bridge was realigned to the west bypassing the bridge in 1963.

== Government and infrastructure ==
The Wyoming Department of Corrections Wyoming Honor Conservation Camp & Boot Camp is located in Newcastle. The facility was operated by the Wyoming Board of Charities and Reform until that agency was dissolved as a result of a state constitutional amendment passed in November 1990.

The United States Postal Service operates the Newcastle Post Office. The Weston County Senior Citizen Center provides paratransit service for Newcastle and its surroundings on weekdays, primarily for use by seniors.

== Education ==
Public education in the city of Newcastle is provided by Weston County School District #1. The district's schools include Newcastle Elementary (split into two campuses for grades K–2 & 3–5), Newcastle Middle School (grades 6–8), and Newcastle High School (grades 9–12).

Newcastle has a public library, a branch of the Weston County Library System.

== Arts and culture ==
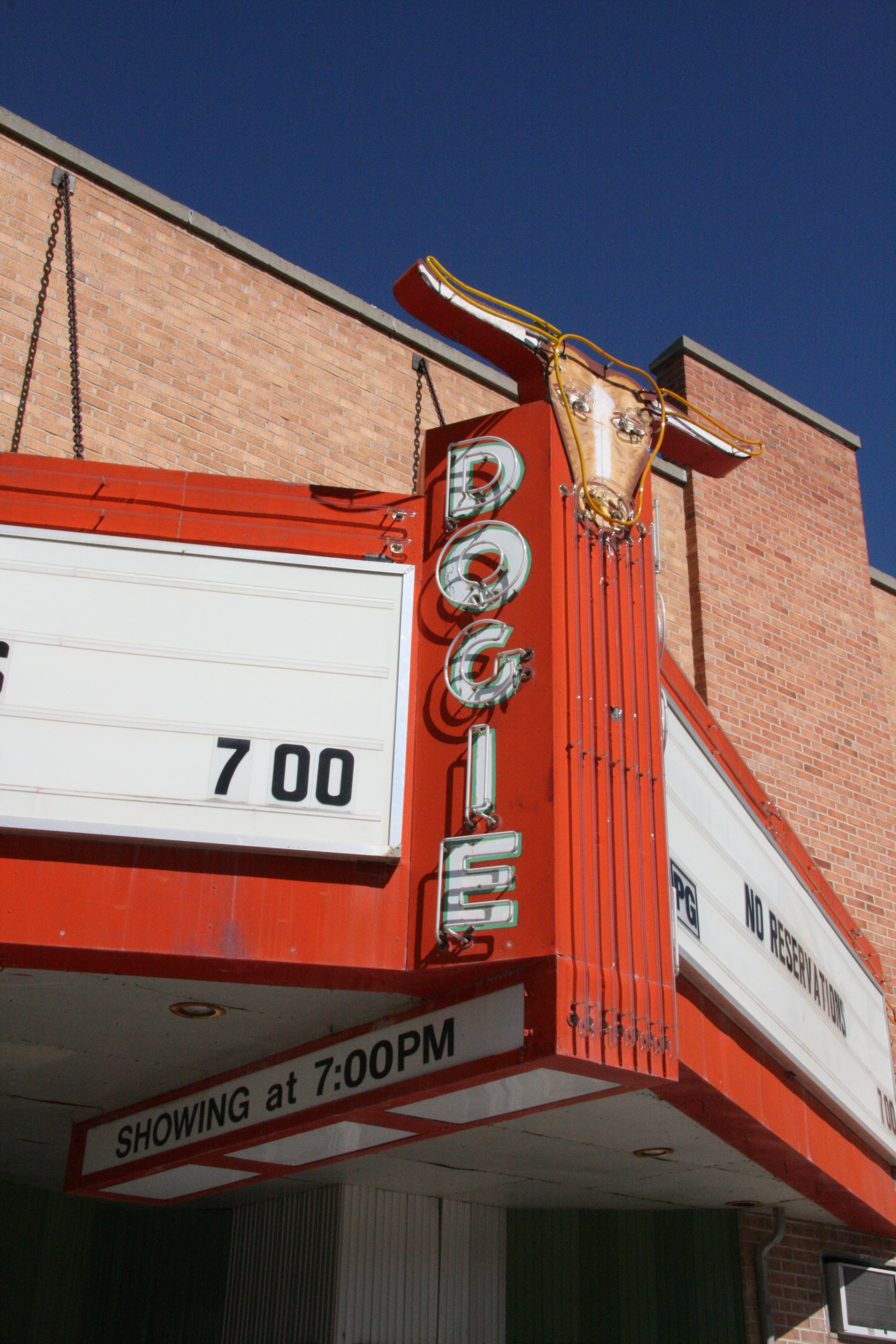
Dogie Theater, Newcastle

The Anna Miller Museum features a model of the ghost mining town of Cambria and the Jenney Stockade Cabin, an old building dating back to the 1874-1879 Black Hills gold rush. It is named after Anna C. Miller née McMoran, the widow of Sheriff Billy Miller, killed in the last Indian skirmish of the area. The building was built 1933–1936 as a WPA project as stables for the Wyoming National Guard Cavalry.

The Dogie Theater opened in 1951 as a state-of-the-art movie theater, named after "Dogie", the mascot of the local High School.

The town boasts great walking trails. The "Serenity Trail" allows walkers to view wildlife in the area. A historic tour starts at the Anna Miller Museum and includes the Greenwood Cemetery and Newcastle's historic commercial district, which, including the Dogie Theater, is listed with the National Register of Historic Places.

== Demographics ==
Historical population
| Census | Pop. | Note | %± |
|---|---|---|---|
| 1890 | 1,715 | | — |
| 1900 | 756 | | −55.9% |
| 1910 | 975 | | 29.0% |
| 1920 | 1,003 | | 2.9% |
| 1930 | 1,201 | | 19.7% |
| 1940 | 1,962 | | 63.4% |
| 1950 | 3,395 | | 73.0% |
| 1960 | 4,345 | | 28.0% |
| 1970 | 3,432 | | −21.0% |
| 1980 | 3,596 | | 4.8% |
| 1990 | 3,003 | | −16.5% |
| 2000 | 3,065 | | 2.1% |
| 2010 | 3,532 | | 15.2% |
| 2020 | 3,374 | | −4.5% |
| 2023 (est.) | 3,326 | | −1.4% |
U.S. Decennial Census

=== 2020 census ===
As of the 2020 census, Newcastle had a population of 3,374. The median age was 42.3 years. 20.8% of residents were under the age of 18 and 20.2% of residents were 65 years of age or older. For every 100 females there were 130.5 males, and for every 100 females age 18 and over there were 138.6 males age 18 and over.

0.0% of residents lived in urban areas, while 100.0% lived in rural areas.

There were 1,290 households in Newcastle, of which 25.1% had children under the age of 18 living in them. Of all households, 43.7% were married-couple households, 23.2% were households with a male householder and no spouse or partner present, and 26.5% were households with a female householder and no spouse or partner present. About 35.7% of all households were made up of individuals and 17.3% had someone living alone who was 65 years of age or older.

There were 1,578 housing units, of which 18.3% were vacant. The homeowner vacancy rate was 4.8% and the rental vacancy rate was 20.4%.

Racial composition as of the 2020 census
| Race | Number | Percent |
|---|---|---|
| White | 2,956 | 87.6% |
| Black or African American | 24 | 0.7% |
| American Indian and Alaska Native | 72 | 2.1% |
| Asian | 19 | 0.6% |
| Native Hawaiian and Other Pacific Islander | 4 | 0.1% |
| Some other race | 112 | 3.3% |
| Two or more races | 187 | 5.5% |
| Hispanic or Latino (of any race) | 225 | 6.7% |

=== 2010 census ===
As of the census of 2010, there were 3,532 people, 1,439 households, and 868 families living in the city. The population density was 1,385.1 inhabitants per square mile (534.8/km^{2}). There were 1,663 housing units at an average density of 652.2 units per square mile (251.8 units/km^{2}). The racial makeup of the city was 94.6% White, 0.4% African American, 1.6% Native American, 0.3% Asian, 0.1% Pacific Islander, 1.0% from other races, and 2.0% from two or more races. Hispanic or Latino people of any race were 3.4% of the population.

There were 1,439 households, of which 27.2% had children under the age of 18 living with them, 47.0% were married couples living together, 8.9% had a female householder with no husband present, 4.4% had a male householder with no wife present, and 39.7% were non-families. 34.7% of all households were made up of individuals, and 13.3% had someone living alone who was 65 years of age or older. The average household size was 2.24 and the average family size was 2.86.

The median age in the city was 39.6 years. 22% of residents were under the age of 18; 8.9% were between the ages of 18 and 24; 25.7% were from 25 to 44; 27.2% were from 45 to 64; and 16.2% were 65 years of age or older. The gender makeup of the city was 53.9% male and 46.1% female.

=== 2000 census ===
As of the census of 2000, there were 3,065 people, 1,253 households, and 844 families living in the city. The population density was 1,242.1 people per square mile (479.6 people/km^{2}). There were 1,458 housing units at an average density of 590.9 units per square mile (228.1 units/km^{2}). The racial makeup of the city was 95.79% White, 0.13% African American, 1.44% Native American, 0.29% Asian, 1.01% from other races, and 1.34% from two or more races. Hispanic or Latino people of any race were 1.66% of the population.

There were 1,253 households, out of which 30.4% had children under the age of 18 living with them, 54.0% were married couples living together, 10.1% had a female householder with no husband present, and 32.6% were non-families. 28.4% of all households were made up of individuals, and 13.0% had someone living alone who was 65 years of age or older. The average household size was 2.35 and the average family size was 2.88.

In the city, the population was spread out, with 24.3% under the age of 18, 7.9% from 18 to 24, 24.7% from 25 to 44, 24.5% from 45 to 64, and 18.6% who were 65 years of age or older. The median age was 40 years. For every 100 females, there were 93.1 males. For every 100 females age 18 and over, there were 91.5 males.

The median income for a household in the city was $29,873, and the median income for a family was $36,929. Males had a median income of $31,222 versus $16,628 for females. The per capita income for the city was $15,378. About 7.5% of families and 11.4% of the population were below the poverty line, including 14.8% of those under the age of 18 and 15.7% of those 65 and older.

== Climate ==
Newcastle experiences a cold semi-arid climate (Köppen BSk) with continental influence, with cold winters and hot, wet summers.

Climate data for Newcastle, Wyoming (1991–2020 normals, extremes 1906–present)
| Month | Jan | Feb | Mar | Apr | May | Jun | Jul | Aug | Sep | Oct | Nov | Dec | Year |
|---|---|---|---|---|---|---|---|---|---|---|---|---|---|
| Record high °F (°C) | 66 (19) | 69 (21) | 82 (28) | 91 (33) | 98 (37) | 105 (41) | 108 (42) | 105 (41) | 101 (38) | 90 (32) | 78 (26) | 68 (20) | 108 (42) |
| Mean maximum °F (°C) | 53.8 (12.1) | 57.5 (14.2) | 69.9 (21.1) | 79.7 (26.5) | 87.4 (30.8) | 94.7 (34.8) | 99.7 (37.6) | 97.9 (36.6) | 93.5 (34.2) | 82.2 (27.9) | 66.8 (19.3) | 54.4 (12.4) | 100.6 (38.1) |
| Mean daily maximum °F (°C) | 34.6 (1.4) | 37.6 (3.1) | 48.3 (9.1) | 57.0 (13.9) | 66.3 (19.1) | 77.6 (25.3) | 86.6 (30.3) | 85.6 (29.8) | 75.1 (23.9) | 58.9 (14.9) | 45.0 (7.2) | 34.6 (1.4) | 58.9 (14.9) |
| Daily mean °F (°C) | 24.4 (−4.2) | 26.9 (−2.8) | 36.9 (2.7) | 45.2 (7.3) | 54.8 (12.7) | 65.3 (18.5) | 73.4 (23.0) | 72.1 (22.3) | 62.0 (16.7) | 47.2 (8.4) | 34.6 (1.4) | 24.8 (−4.0) | 47.3 (8.5) |
| Mean daily minimum °F (°C) | 14.2 (−9.9) | 16.2 (−8.8) | 25.5 (−3.6) | 33.3 (0.7) | 43.3 (6.3) | 53.0 (11.7) | 60.2 (15.7) | 58.5 (14.7) | 49.0 (9.4) | 35.5 (1.9) | 24.2 (−4.3) | 15.0 (−9.4) | 35.7 (2.1) |
| Mean minimum °F (°C) | −9.7 (−23.2) | −6.4 (−21.3) | 3.4 (−15.9) | 16.6 (−8.6) | 26.3 (−3.2) | 38.5 (3.6) | 48.0 (8.9) | 44.9 (7.2) | 32.0 (0.0) | 14.9 (−9.5) | 2.4 (−16.4) | −6.7 (−21.5) | −17.0 (−27.2) |
| Record low °F (°C) | −37 (−38) | −33 (−36) | −18 (−28) | −13 (−25) | 11 (−12) | 28 (−2) | 37 (3) | 26 (−3) | 12 (−11) | −11 (−24) | −21 (−29) | −35 (−37) | −37 (−38) |
| Average precipitation inches (mm) | 0.51 (13) | 0.67 (17) | 0.77 (20) | 1.70 (43) | 2.90 (74) | 2.68 (68) | 2.54 (65) | 1.82 (46) | 1.20 (30) | 1.24 (31) | 0.59 (15) | 0.54 (14) | 17.16 (436) |
| Average snowfall inches (cm) | 6.8 (17) | 7.7 (20) | 4.9 (12) | 5.0 (13) | 0.6 (1.5) | 0.0 (0.0) | 0.0 (0.0) | 0.0 (0.0) | 0.2 (0.51) | 1.4 (3.6) | 5.5 (14) | 6.8 (17) | 38.9 (99) |
| Average precipitation days (≥ 0.01 in) | 5.9 | 6.3 | 6.3 | 8.1 | 10.6 | 10.6 | 8.9 | 6.9 | 6.4 | 6.8 | 5.3 | 5.8 | 87.9 |
| Average snowy days (≥ 0.1 in) | 4.0 | 4.1 | 2.6 | 1.9 | 0.2 | 0.0 | 0.0 | 0.0 | 0.1 | 0.9 | 2.5 | 3.7 | 20.0 |
Source: NOAA

== Notable people ==
- Frank Wheeler Mondell (1860–1939), United States Representative from Wyoming
- Edwin Keith Thomson (1919–1960), Wyoming politician

== See also ==
- List of cities in Wyoming
