= List of rivers of Wyoming =

The following is a list of rivers in Wyoming, United States.

== East of the continental divide ==
=== Missouri River watershed ===
- Gallatin River
- Madison River
  - Firehole River
  - Gibbon River
- Yellowstone River
  - Gardner River
  - Lamar River
    - Slough Creek
  - Clarks Fork of the Yellowstone River
    - Rock Creek
  - Wind River/Bighorn River
    - Little Bighorn River
    - Little Wind River
      - North Fork Popo Agie River
      - Middle Fork Popo Agie River
      - Little Popo Agie River
        - Roaring Fork Creek
    - Shoshone River
    - Greybull River
    - Shoshone River
    - Gooseberry Creek (Wind River/Bighorn River)
    - Owl Creek
    - Muddy Creek
    - Nowood River
      - Tensleep Creek
      - Paint Rock Creek
  - Tongue River
    - Big Goose Creek (near Sheridan)
      - Little Goose Creek (near Sheridan)
    - Little Tongue River (Dayton)
  - Powder River
    - Clear Creek
      - Rock Creek
- Little Missouri River
- Cheyenne River
  - Belle Fourche River
- Niobrara River
- North Platte River
  - Encampment River
  - Medicine Bow River
    - Rock Creek
    - Little Medicine Bow River
  - Sweetwater River
  - Laramie River
    - Little Laramie River
      - North Fork Little Laramie River
        - Libby Creek
      - Middle Fork Little Laramie River
      - South Fork Little Laramie River
    - North Laramie River
    - Chugwater Creek

==== South Platte River watershed ====
- Crow Creek
- Lodgepole Creek

== West of the continental divide ==
=== Colorado River watershed ===
- Green River
  - Big Sandy River
  - Blacks Fork
    - Smiths Fork
    - Hams Fork
  - Yampa River
    - Little Snake River
      - Roaring Fork Little Snake River
      - North Fork Little Snake River
  - New Fork River

=== Columbia River watershed ===
- Snake River
  - Henrys Fork (Snake River tributary)
    - Fall River
  - Salt River
    - Swift Creek
    - Cottonwood Creek
  - Greys River
    - Little Greys River
  - Hoback River
    - Granite Creek
    - South Fork Hoback River
  - Gros Ventre River
  - Lewis River
  - Heart River
  - Wolverine Creek
  - Plateau Creek

=== Great Salt Lake watershed ===
- Bear River (Great Salt Lake)

== Alphabetically ==
- Bear River (Great Salt Lake)
- Belle Fourche River
- Big Goose Creek (near Sheridan)
- Big Sandy River
- Bighorn River
- Blacks Fork
- Cheyenne River
- Chugwater Creek
- Clarks Fork of the Yellowstone River
- Clear Creek
- Cottonwood Creek
- Crow Creek
- Dead Indian Creek
- Encampment River
- Fall River
- Firehole River
- Gallatin River
- Gardner River
- Gibbon River
- Gooseberry Creek
- Granite Creek
- Green River
- Greybull River
- Greys River
- Gros Ventre River
- Hams Fork
- Heart River
- Henrys Fork
- Hoback River
- Lamar River
- Laramie River
- Lewis River
- Libby Creek
- Little Bighorn River
- Little Goose Creek (near Sheridan)
- Little Greys River
- Little Laramie River
- Little Medicine Bow River
- Little Missouri River
- Little Snake River
- Little Tongue River (near Dayton)
- Little Wind River
- Lodgepole Creek
- Madison River
- Medicine Bow River
- Middle Fork Little Laramie River
- Middle Fork Little Snake River
- Middle Fork Popo Agie River
- Muddy Creek
- New Fork River
- Niobrara River
- North Fork Little Laramie River
- North Fork Little Snake River
- North Fork Popo Agie River
- North Laramie River
- North Platte River
- Nowood River
- Owl Creek
- Paint Rock Creek
- Plateau Creek
- Powder River
- Roaring Fork Creek
- Roaring Fork Little Snake River
- Rock Creek (Clear Creek)
- Rock Creek (Medicine Bow River tributary)
- Salt River
- Shell Creek
- Shoshone River
- Slough Creek
- Smiths Fork
- Snake River
- South Fork Hoback River
- South Fork Little Laramie River
- South Platte River
- Sweetwater River
- Swift Creek
- Tensleep Creek
- Tongue River
- Wind River
- Wolverine Creek
- Yellowstone River

== See also ==
- List of rivers in the United States
