= Libby Creek =

Libby Creek may refer to:

- Libby Creek (Wyoming)
- Libby Creek (Washington)
