= Nash Fork =

River in Wyoming

Coordinates: 41°20′10″N 106°09′51″W

The Nash Fork is a 7.1-mile-long (11.4 km) tributary of the North Fork of the Little Laramie River in southern Wyoming. The Nash Fork starts as it flows out of the Glacial Lakes and flows through Brooklyn and Little Brooklyn lake and down the east side of the Snowies until it empties into the North Fork of the Little Laramie. Major tributaries of the Nash Fork include Gold Run Creek and Silver Run Creek, both of which enter from the south.

== See also ==
- List of Wyoming rivers
