= Roaring Fork Little Snake River =

Physical characteristics
- Source
  - coordinates: 41°06′28″N 106°59′47″W
- Mouth
  - location: Confluence with Little Snake River
  - coordinates: 41°00′05″N 107°04′07″W
  - elevation: 6,965 ft (2,123 m)

Basin features
- Progression: Little Snake—Yampa— Green—Colorado

Roaring Fork Little Snake River is a 12.0-mile-long (19.3 km) tributary of the Little Snake River in Colorado and Wyoming. It flows from a source in the Medicine Bow National Forest of Carbon County, Wyoming to a confluence with the Little Snake River in Routt County, Colorado.

== See also ==
- List of rivers of Colorado
- List of rivers of Wyoming
- List of tributaries of the Colorado River
