= Rock Creek (Clear Creek tributary) =

Coordinates: 44°21′45″N 106°39′38″W

Location
- Country: United States
- State: Wyoming
- Cities: Saddlestring, Buffalo

Physical characteristics
- Source: Rock Creek Roadless Area
  - location: Bighorn Mountains, Johnson County, Wyoming
- Mouth: Clear Creek
  - location: Johnson County, Wyoming
  - elevation: 4,490 ft (1,370 m)
- Length: 65 mi (105 km)
- Discharge
  - average: 80 cu ft/s (2.3 m^{3}/s)
  - minimum: 9.8 cu ft/s (0.28 m^{3}/s)
  - maximum: 469 cu ft/s (13.3 m^{3}/s)

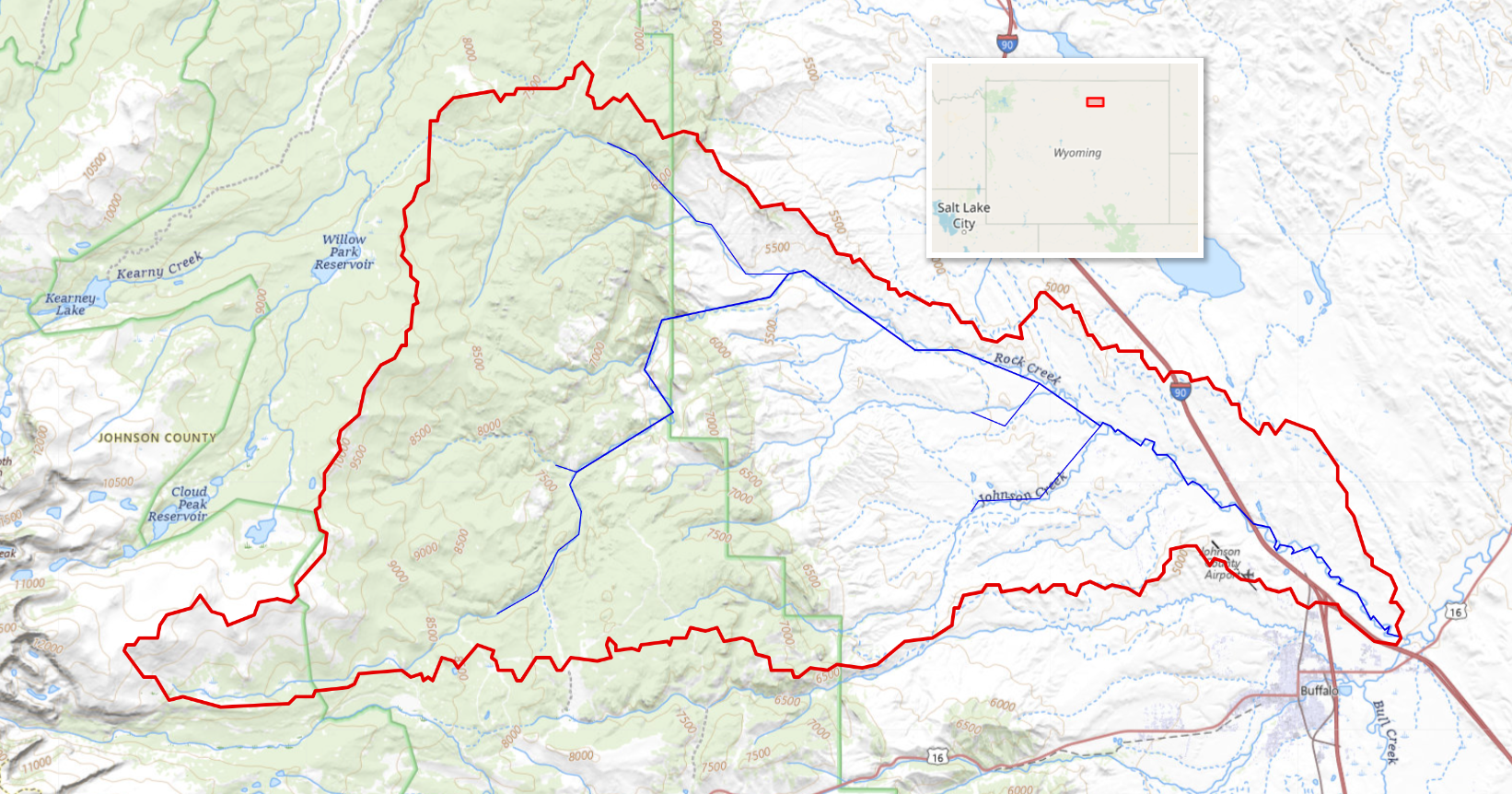
Map of the Rock Creek Watershed.

Rock Creek is a freestone stream in the northeastern part of the U.S. state of Wyoming. It is a tributary of Clear Creek, within the Powder River watershed. Its source is located in the Rock Creek Roadless Area. According to the U.S. Geological Survey, Rock Creek drains approx. 60 miles (97 km) before discharging into Clear Creek, just east of the city of Buffalo and Interstate 90.

The United States Forest Service recommended the Rock Creek area for wilderness designation in its 2005 Revised Land and Resource Management Plan. When Congresswoman Cynthia Lummis was asked about her position regarding the recommendation for designating the Rock Creek Roadless Area as wilderness, she stated she would support the decisions of the local Johnson County Commissioners. On March 16, 2010, Albert L. "Smokey" Wildeman moved to adopt Resolution #399 opposing the proposal for “Wilderness Designation” in the Rock Creek area. Delbert Eitel seconded, and the motion was carried.

== See also ==
- List of Wyoming rivers
- Rock Creek Roadless Area
