= Roosevelt Fire =

2018 wildfire in Wyoming

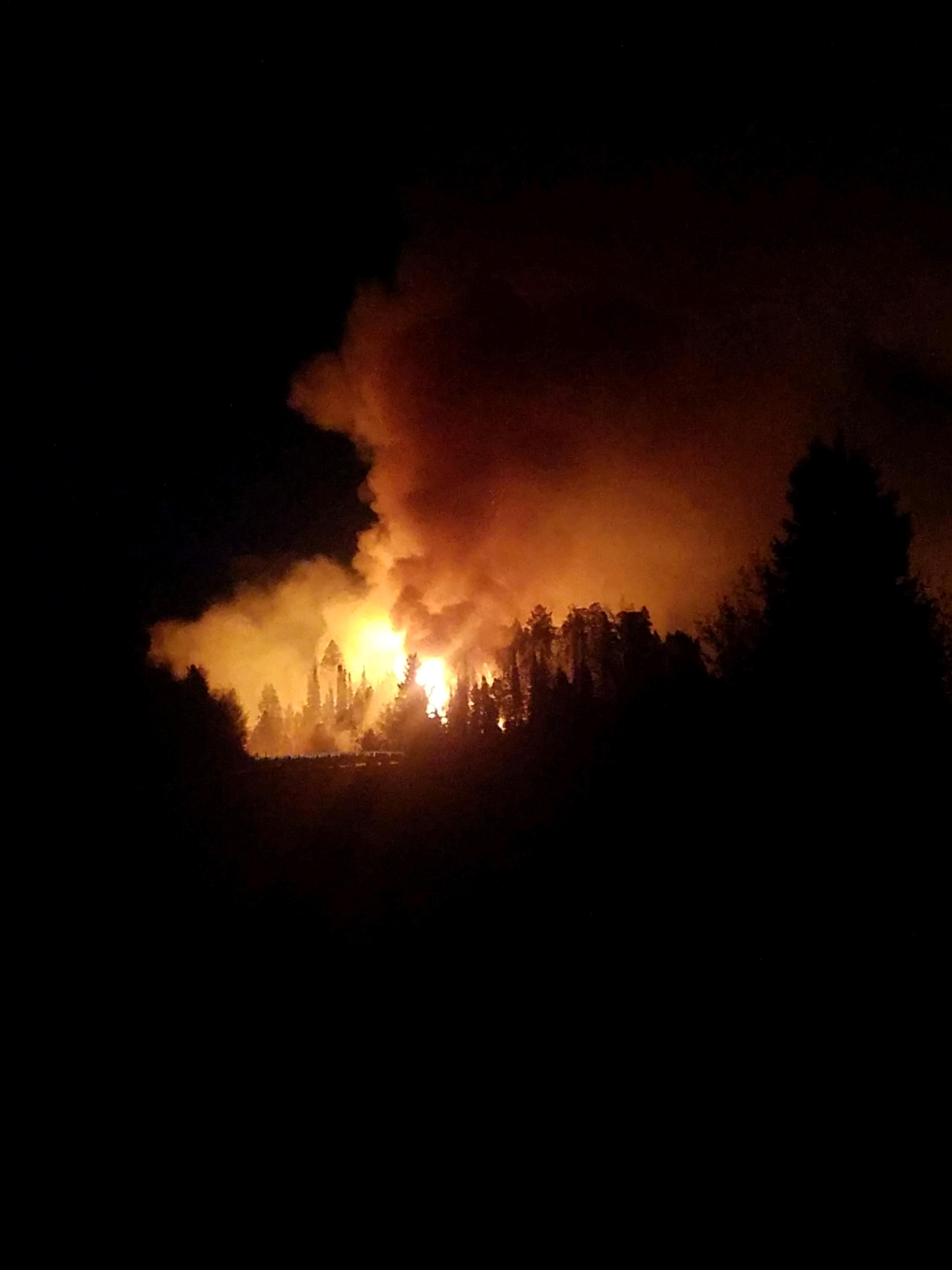
- Roosevelt Fire during overnight controlled burn operations on September 25, 2018
- Date: September 15, 2018; 12:00 AM
- Location: Bridger-Teton National Forest, Lincoln and Sublette County, Wyoming United States
- Coordinates: 43.041°N 110.587°W

Statistics
- Burned area: 61,511 acres (24,893 ha)
- Land use: National Forest and private property

Impacts
- Deaths: 0
- Injuries: 3
- Structures lost: 55

Ignition
- Cause: Human caused

The Roosevelt Fire was a wildfire in Bridger-Teton National Forest in the U.S. state of Wyoming. The ignition point was near the head of the Hoback River in the Wyoming Range 32 miles (51 km) south of the town of Jackson, Wyoming. The fire was reported by a hunting party on September 15, 2018; the party attempted to leave the area on September 16, but ideal fire conditions allowed for rapid growth and two of them were forced to jump into a creek to escape the flames. The hunters, a father and son, were transported to a local hospital then to a burn center in Salt Lake City. By Monday September 17, the fire had moved several miles east, triggering evacuations in residential areas northwest of Pinedale, Wyoming in its path. By September 18, the fire was moving northeast, prompting the evacuation of the Hoback Ranches subdivision south of the town of Bondurant for a total of 230 homes evacuated. By the morning of September 19, the fire had expanded to over 25,000 acres (10,000 ha). As of September 20, the fire began to burn outside the national forest to the edge of the Hoback Ranches; and was 3 mi (4.8 km) west of U.S. Route 189/191, leading officials to declare that further encroachment toward the highway would lead them to shut down a section of it for public safety. By September 21, more than a half dozen helicopters were assigned to and several air tankers were dropping retardant on the fire which was reported to have grown to 34,411 acres (13,926 ha). On September 23 the fire was spreading rapidly to the east and north forcing authorities to close a fifty mile stretch of U.S. route 189/191 from mile marker 110 to 160 to clear the road for evacuations underway, however the highway was reopened the following day.

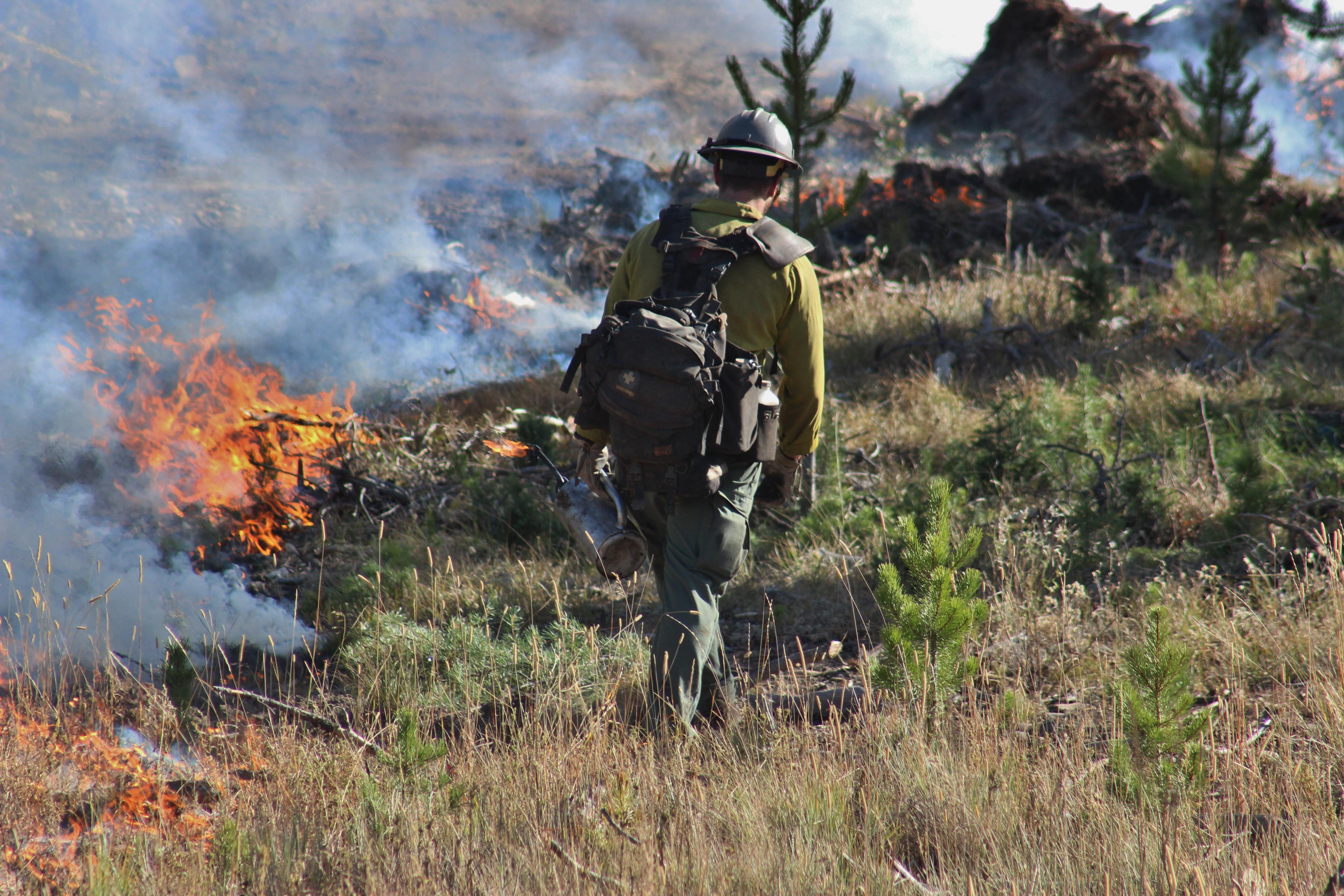
A member of a wildland firefighting Hotshot crew uses a driptorch to do a controlled burn on the fire on September 24, 2018.

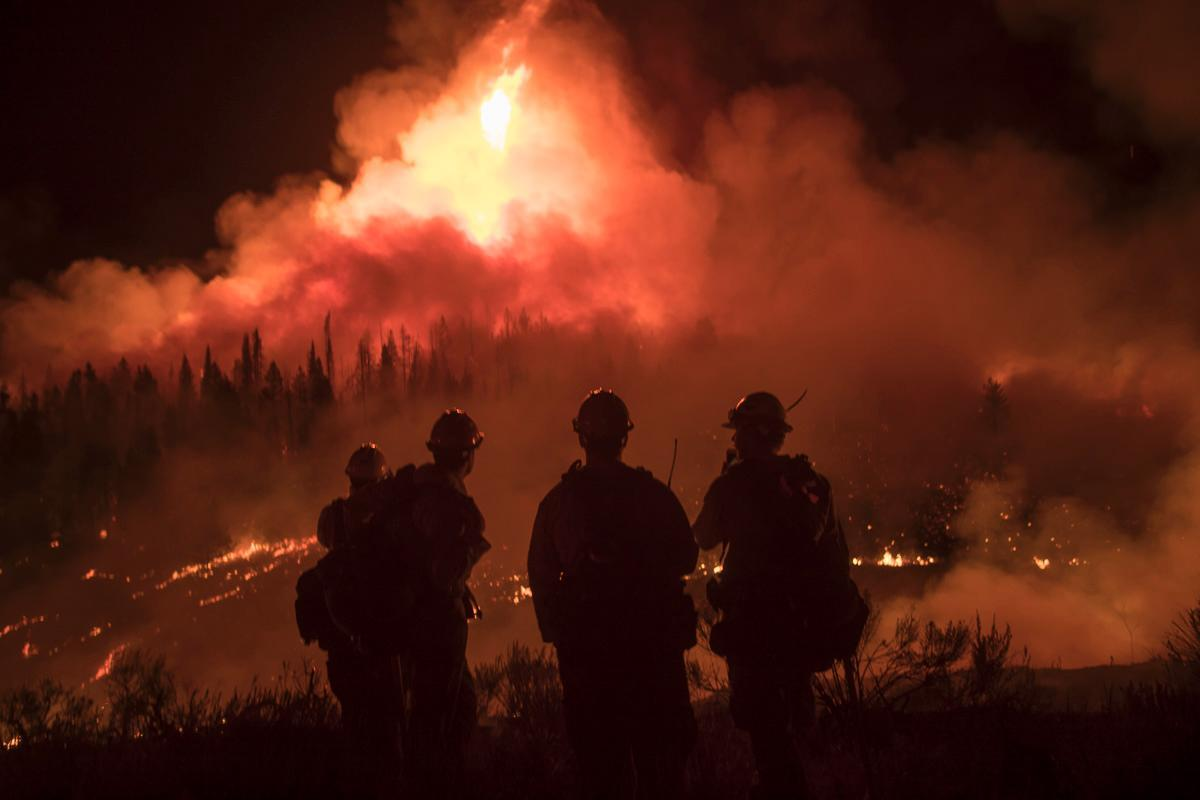
Firefighters monitor the fire during nighttime controlled burn operations

By September 25 U.S. route 189/191 was closed again at midday to allow firefighters to commence controlled burns to eliminate fuel in the path of the fire. Staffing was increased to 982 firefighters and support personnel consisting of 28 crews. 56 engines and 10 helicopters and aircraft were also assigned to the fire that has been to reported to have burned over 20 private residences. At least 500 persons had been evacuated with many unsure when they could return as electrical power had been turned off to help reduce the chances for the fire to spread. On September 27 officials reported that U.S. route 189/191 would be open during daytime but remain closed at night until the threat of the fire crossing the highway we eliminated. Fifty-five of the 150 homes in the Hoback Ranches subdivision had been destroyed by the blaze and more than 1,000 firefighters were assigned to the incident. Investigators determined on September 28 that the cause of the fire was due to an abandoned "warming fire" left unattended possibly by a hunting party or other recreationists. 1,176 personnel were assigned to the fire by September 29 and the acreage burned by that date was 57,969 acres (23,459 ha), which is roughly 90 square miles (230 km^{2}). On October 2 the fire was estimated to have consumed 61,509 acres (24,892 ha) but rain was anticipated along with cooler daytime highs and higher humidity levels that were expected to help prevent further spread of the fire. The fire was reported as fully contained on October 5 though some smoke and smoldering would continue within the fire lines. After peaking at 1175 personnel, less than 50 firefighting personnel remained on the fire to perform mop up and to monitor the situation.
