= Rhythmic spring =

Cold water spring with regular flow variation over short intervals

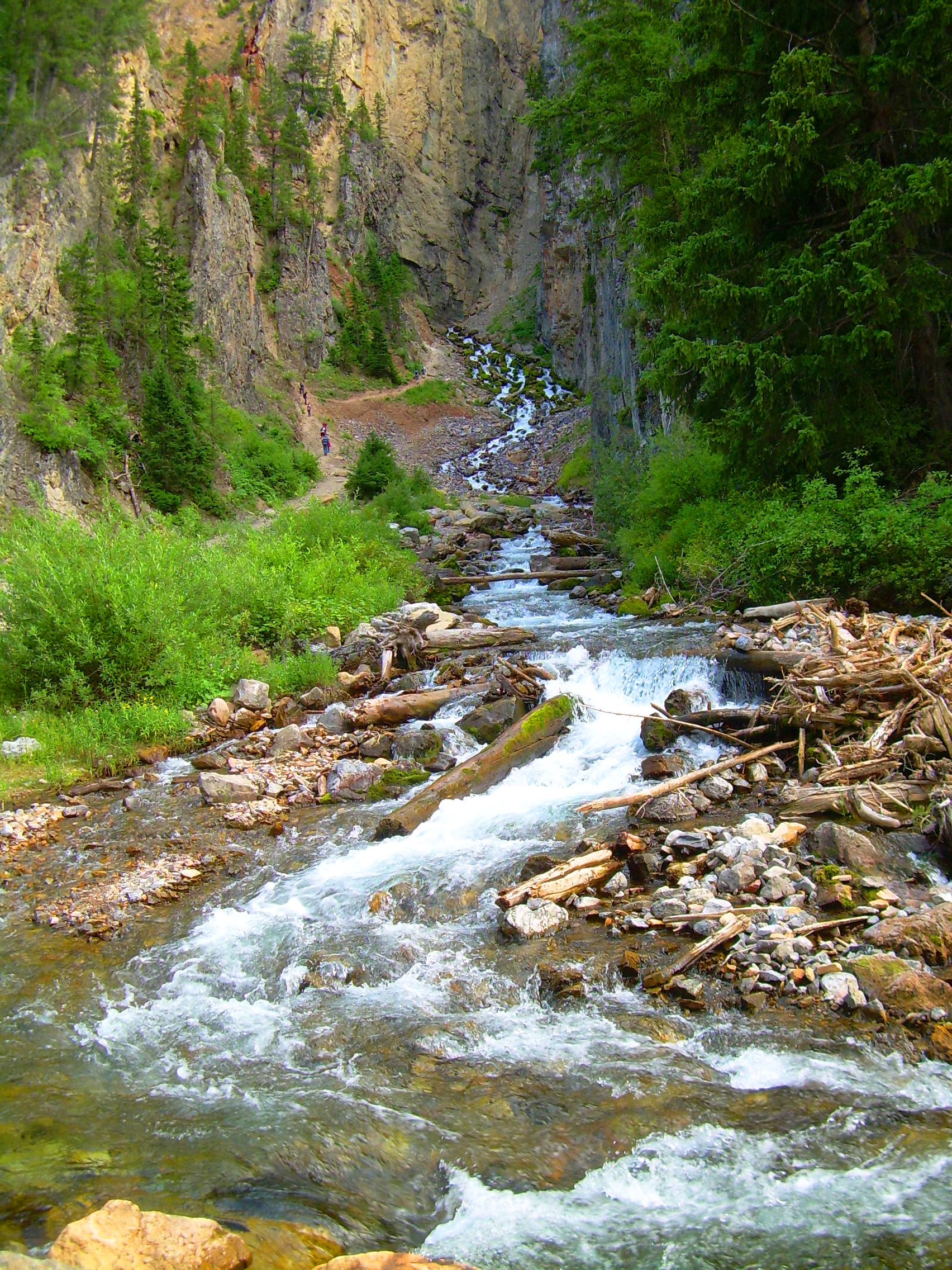
Swift Creek flowing out of Intermittent Spring in Wyoming

A rhythmic spring (also: ebb and flow spring, periodic spring, intermittent spring) is a cold water spring from which the flow of water either varies or starts and stops entirely, over a fairly regular time-scale of minutes or hours. Compared to continuously flowing springs, rhythmic springs are uncommon, with the number worldwide estimated in 1991 to be around one hundred.

== Theory ==
Although the cause of the periodicity in flow is not known for certain, the most accepted theory (first postulated in the early 18th century) is that as groundwater flows continuously into a cavern, it fills a narrow tube that leads upwards from near the base of the cavern, then downwards to the spring. As the water level reaches the high point of the tube, it creates a siphon effect, sucking water out of the chamber. Eventually air rushes into the tube and breaks the siphon, stopping the flow if there is no other source feeding the spring, or reducing the flow if there is a continuous flow from another non-siphon source.

In 2006 the University of Utah studied Intermittent Spring in Swift Creek canyon in the Star Valley, Wyoming, United States. Kip Solomon, a hydrologist at the University concluded that "The spring water's gas content has now been tested .... The data strongly suggests the water was exposed to air underground; strong support for the siphon theory."

== Notable rhythmic springs ==
Intermittent Spring in Wyoming, mentioned above, is the largest rhythmic spring in the world.

Gihon Spring in the City of David in Jerusalem used to be a rhythmic spring before modern-time overpumping affected the level of the underground water table. It was of great historical, archaeological, and cultural importance because it is what made possible the human settlement in ancient Jerusalem.

Pliny the Younger – who is famous for his accurate description of the Vesuvius eruption of AD 79 – also accurately described a rhythmic spring in the last letter of Book IV. This rhythmic spring is still acting to the same time scale today (Villa Pliniana spring in Como, Italy).

In Ariège, France, the Fontaine intermittente de Fontestorbes tributary of the Hers-Vif River is another example of an intermittent spring.

=== Rhythmic springs in Serbia ===
In Serbia there are four intermittent springs:

- Bjeluška Potajnica, near Arilje in western Serbia
- Homoljska Potajnica, near Žagubica in eastern Serbia
- Kučevska Potajnica (Zviška Potajnica), near Kučevo in eastern Serbia
- Promuklica, near Tutin in south-western Serbia
