= Hoback =

Hoback may refer to:

== Places ==
- Hoback, Wyoming, a census-designated place in Teton County
- Hoback River, a tributary of the Snake River

== People with the surname ==
- Cullen Hoback, American filmmaker
- Randy Hoback, Canadian politician
