= Boston Wyoming Smelter Site =

- Grand Encampment Mining Region: Boston Wyoming Smelter Site
- U.S. National Register of Historic Places
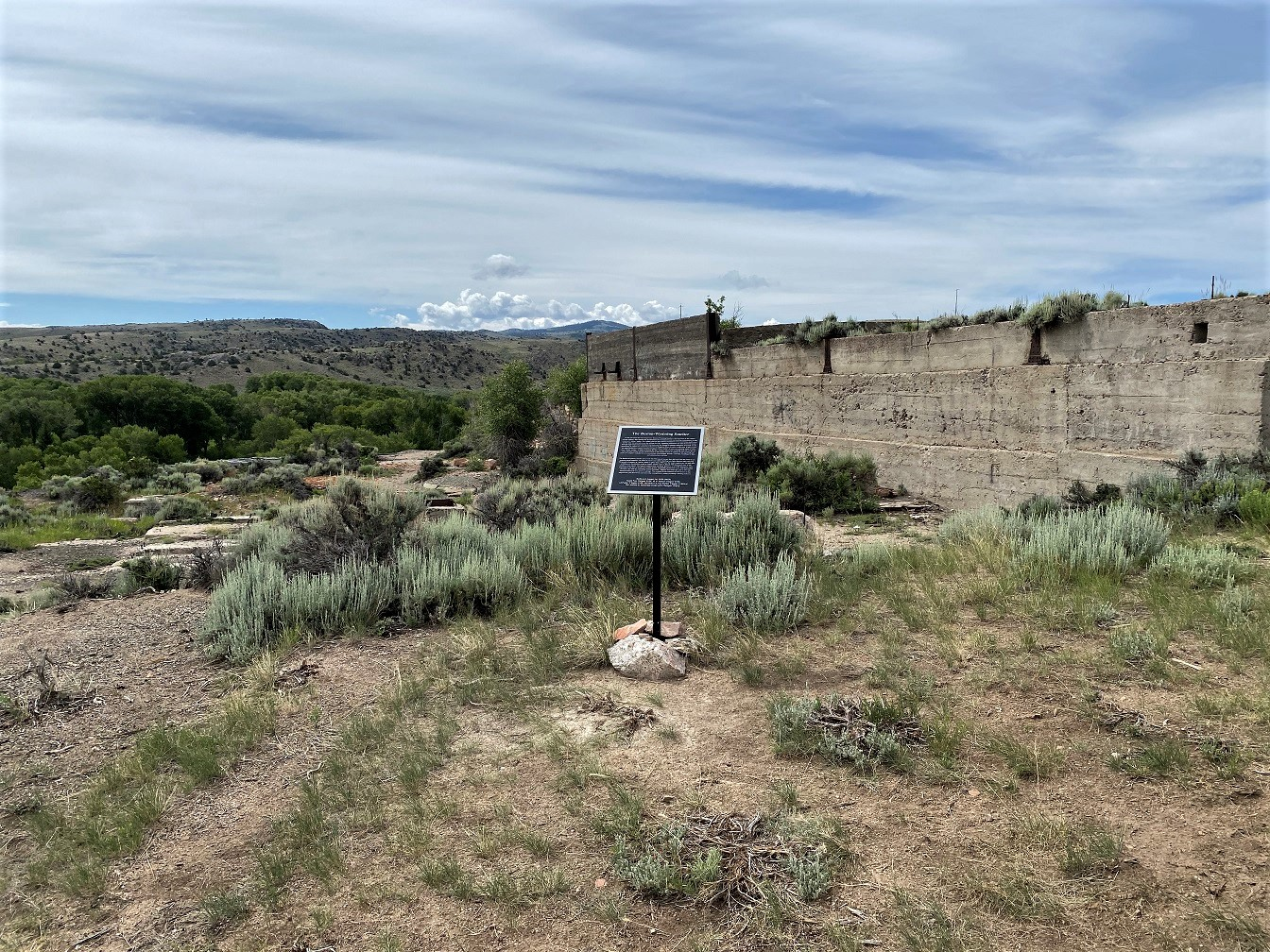
- Boston Wyoming Smelter Site in 2023

- Location within Wyoming
- Nearest city: Encampment, Wyoming
- Coordinates: 41°12′35″N 106°46′46″W
- Area: 2 acres (0.81 ha)
- Built: 1902
- NRHP reference No.: 73001927
- Added to NRHP: July 2, 1973

The Boston Wyoming Smelter Site was the site of a copper smelter that processed ores from the nearby Grand Encampment Mining District in Carbon County, Wyoming in the early 20th century. The site includes the former town of Rudefeha and is near Encampment, Wyoming. The smelter was constructed in 1902 by Grand Encampment promoter Willis George Emerson, connected to the main Ferris-Haggerty Mine location by a 16-mile (26 km) aerial tram over the Continental Divide. The smelter initially produced matte, an intermediate product in copper refining. In 1903 it was upgraded to produce blister copper. Power for the blowers needed for the blister refining process came from a water turbine at the end of a 4-foot (1.2 m) diameter wood-stave pipe from the South Fork of the Encampment River, 4 miles (6.4 km) away. The smelter could process 300 to 400 tons of ore a day.

A decline in the price of copper, poor yield from the mines, bad weather and financial difficulties plagued the mining venture, particularly after it had been sold to outside investors for $10,000,000 in 1904. A fire in March 1906 destroyed most of the smelter, and another in May set back reconstruction efforts. The smelter was rebuilt, but was under-insured. By 1910 the Penn-Wyoming Copper Company was bankrupt and the smelter was shut down and salvaged in 1913.

All smelter buildings have been removed and the site is used as a trash dump. The foundations remain. The smelter site was placed on the National Register of Historic Places on July 2, 1973.
