= Medicine Bow River =

Coordinates: 42°00′9.9″N 106°41′12.26″W

Physical characteristics
- Source
  - location: Snowy Range, Carbon County, Wyoming
- Mouth
  - location: Seminoe Reservoir, Carbon County, Wyoming
  - elevation: 6,360 feet (1,940 m)
- Length: 167 mi (269 km)
- Basin size: 2,338 mi^{2} (6,060 km^{2})

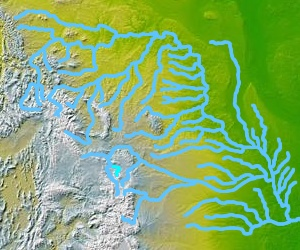
The Medicine Bow River

The Medicine Bow River is a 167-mile-long (269 km) tributary of the North Platte River, in southern Wyoming in the United States.

== Description ==
It rises in the Snowy Range, flowing out of the North Gap Lake, in southeastern Carbon County. It flows north, past Elk Mountain, then northeast, then northwest past the town of Medicine Bow and between the Shirley Mountains to the north and the Medicine Bow Mountains to the south. Near the town of Medicine Bow the Medicine Bow River is joined by its two largest tributaries, Rock Creek and the Little Medicine Bow River. It joins the North Platte in the Seminoe Reservoir, with the lower 10 miles (16 km) of the river forming an arm of the reservoir.

== Discharge statistics ==
Statistic	Time period	Discharge
Annual mean discharge	Year	16.0cf/s
Month with highest mean discharge	May	83.5cf/s
Month with lowest mean discharge	September	1.61cf/s

== See also ==
- List of Wyoming rivers
