= Little Laramie River =

River in Wyoming, United States

Coordinates: 41°28′29″N 105°43′56″W

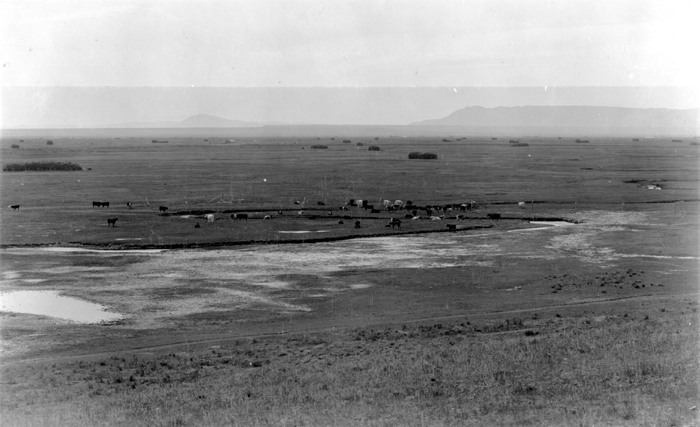
Laramie Plains looking southwest from ridge 2 miles north of Mandel, Little Laramie river in the foreground, Sheep Mountain to left of center. Albany County. 1905.

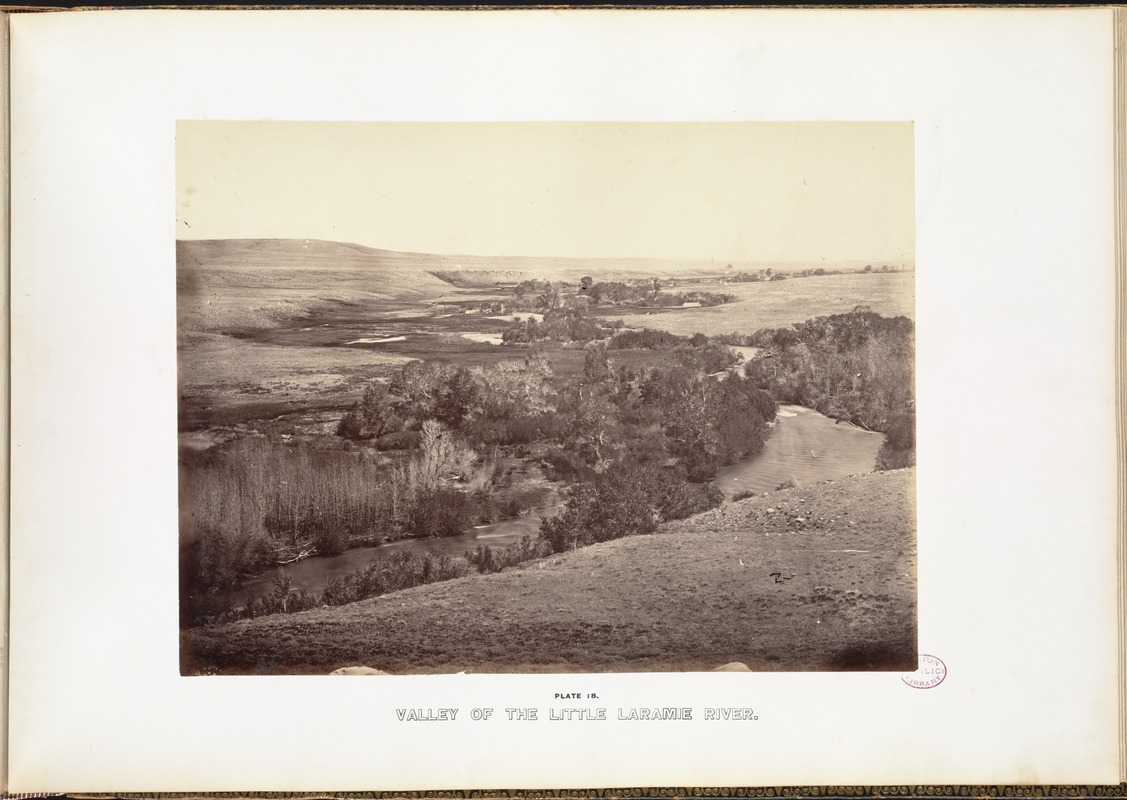
Valley of the Little Laramie River, ca. 1868. Photographs of the American West, Boston Public Library

The Little Laramie River, often referred to simply as the Little Laramie, is one of the largest tributaries of the Laramie River, flowing 45.7 miles (73.5 km) in the U.S. state of Wyoming. The Little Laramie is formed by the merger of three smaller streams, the North Fork, the Middle Fork and the South Fork of the Little Laramie. The drainage basin of the tributaries of the Little Laramie River includes much of the eastern half of the Snowy Range as well as all steams flowing through the Centennial Valley. After leaving the base of the Snowy Range, the small river flows northeast, eventually emptying into the Laramie River.

== North fork ==
The North Fork flows eastward from snowpack in the highest peaks in the Snowy Range, past the town of Centennial to where it merges with the Little Laramie River. The largest tributaries of the North Fork are Libby Creek and the Nash Fork.

== See also ==
- List of Wyoming rivers
- Little Laramie Stage Station
