= Slough Creek (Wyoming) =

River in Montana and Wyoming, United States

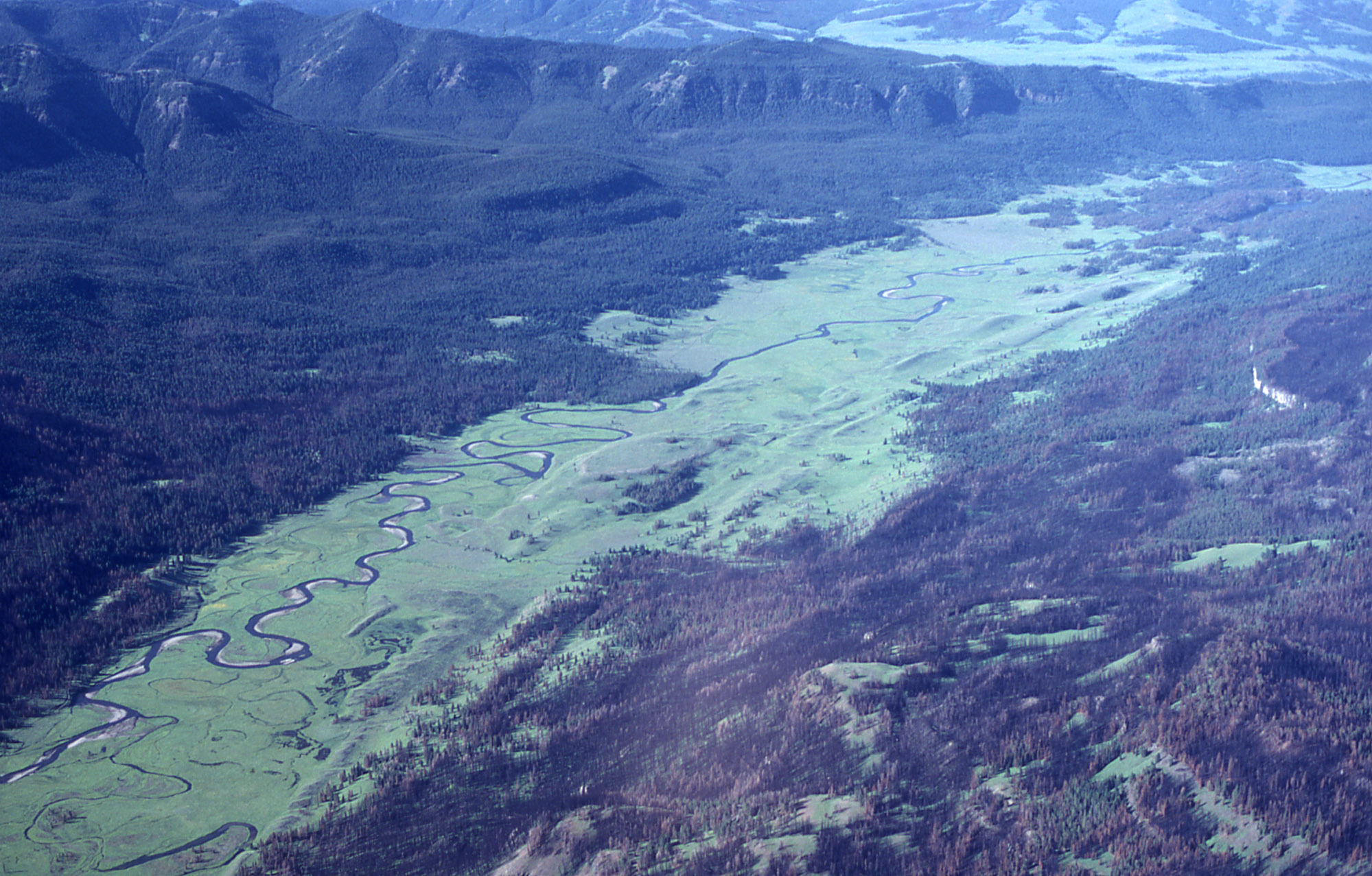
- Aerial view of Slough Creek in 1989

Location
- Country: United States
- State: Montana, Wyoming

Physical characteristics
- Source
  - location: Beartooth Mountains, Montana
  - coordinates: 45°12′32″N 110°07′10″W
- Mouth: Lamar River
  - location: Yellowstone National Park, Wyoming
  - coordinates: 44°55′06″N 110°20′51″W
- Length: 25 mi (40 km)

Slough Creek is a tributary of the Lamar River, approximately 25 mi (40 km) long, in Montana and Wyoming in the United States.

== History ==
Slough Creek got its name when an 1867 party of gold prospectors ventured into the valley and described its condition as a slough. The name began appearing on maps as early as 1872. A myth associated with the name involves a U.S. Army enlisted man who was escorting an exploring party in 1873 and got lost in the valley. Trumpeter John P. Slough of Company I, Second Cavalry wrote this in his diary:

We attempted to follow the Hayden trail to ascertain where he had crossed the Yellowstone River below the lake. We lost the trail and my Captain Henry E. Noise [Noyes] and my self started to find it the timber and mountains we became lost and on the second day were found by a detachment under Sergeant Kinnoss, and the creek found upon now bears my name (Slough Creek)

— John P. Slough, August 6, 1922

Although many have attempted to attribute the name to Trumpeter Slough based on his diary, the name was given in 1867.

== Location ==
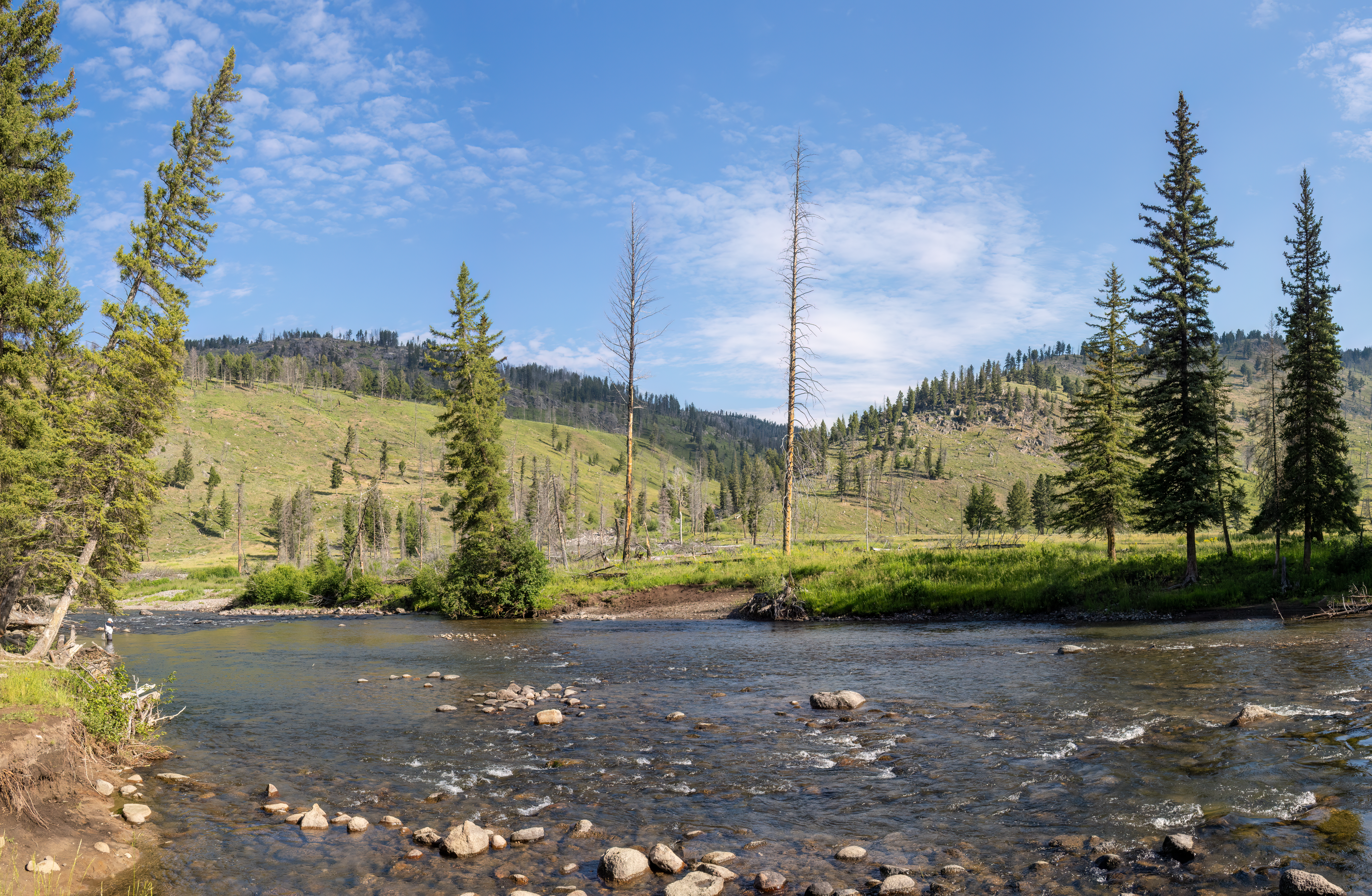
Slough Creek fishing area

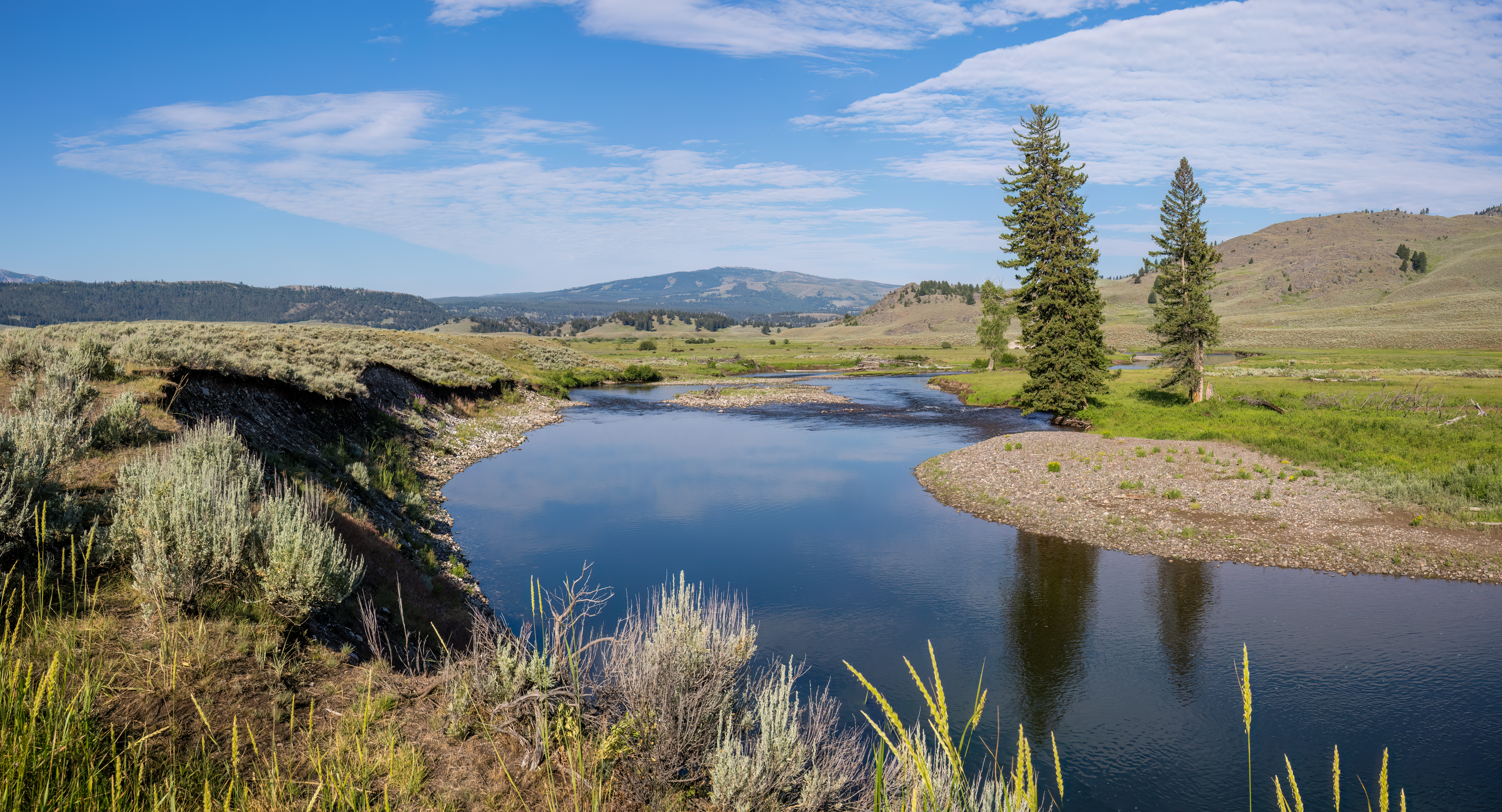
Lower Slough Creek

It rises in southern Montana, in the Absaroka-Beartooth Wilderness in the Beartooth Mountains, and flows southwest, into Yellowstone National Park and into Wyoming. It discharges to the Lamar River near Tower junction within Yellowstone National Park. In turn the Lamar River forms a confluence with the Yellowstone River inside of Yellowstone National Park. Slough Creek is a mildly alkali watercourse. The Slough Creek watershed consists of mixed fir forest, sage flats and grassland. These plant communities support considerable faunal diversity, including coyote and bison.

== Angling ==
Slough Creek is one of the most popular fishing areas in Yellowstone Park. The access is relatively easy and the cutthroat fishing is some of the best in the world. The lower meadows of Slough Creek, below the campground, are easily accessible from parking areas between the campground and the Cooke City road. There are rainbow trout in this lower water as well as Yellowstone cutthroat trout and cutthroat/rainbow hybrids. The upper meadows of Slough are accessed from a trailhead near the campground. The first meadow is a 45-minute walk from the trailhead. The first meadow is the most popular since it is nearby and the fishing is excellent. Slough Creek's second meadow is about a three-hour hike. Cutthroat trout in Slough offer good dry fly fishing with heavy hatches of caddis, pale morning duns, and large Green Drakes in July. Terrestrials are prominent in late summer. In the summer of 2007 an angler reported the first rainbow trout to be caught upstream of the Slough Creek falls. The introduction of rainbow trout may affect both the native cutthroat trout as well as other wildlife species who count on the cutthroat as a food source. Slough Creek is not usually fishable until about the second week of July, because of high water, so check conditions by contacting local fly stores The National Park Service has made frequent changes to the regulations for Slough Creek, and in 2018 has made significant new changes. Anglers are now required to kill all non-native fish, including rainbow trout, brook trout, and identifiable rainbow/cutthroat hybrids throughout the Lamar drainage, including all of Slough Creek. On page 14 of the 2018 regulations they still say that if it has a red slash put it back, but that is clearly superseded by the region specific requirement that if a fish landed in the Lamar drainage is clearly identifiable as a hybrid then it must be killed, even if it has a red slash, with the caveat that "if you don't know, let it go." Another significant change to the Park-wide fishing regulations is that felt soles are no longer permitted on waders. Other Park-wide regulations, that continue from previous years, are that barbed hooks, lead weights, lead split shot, and live bait are banned.

== Wolves ==
In 2003, a wolf pack formed in Yellowstone National Park along the creek and it was named the Slough Creek Pack. Founding members came from the Druid Peak and the Mollie's Pack.

== See also ==
- Angling in Yellowstone National Park
- Fishes of Yellowstone National Park
- List of rivers of Montana
- Montana Stream Access Law
- List of Wyoming rivers
