= Lamar River =

River in Wyoming, United States

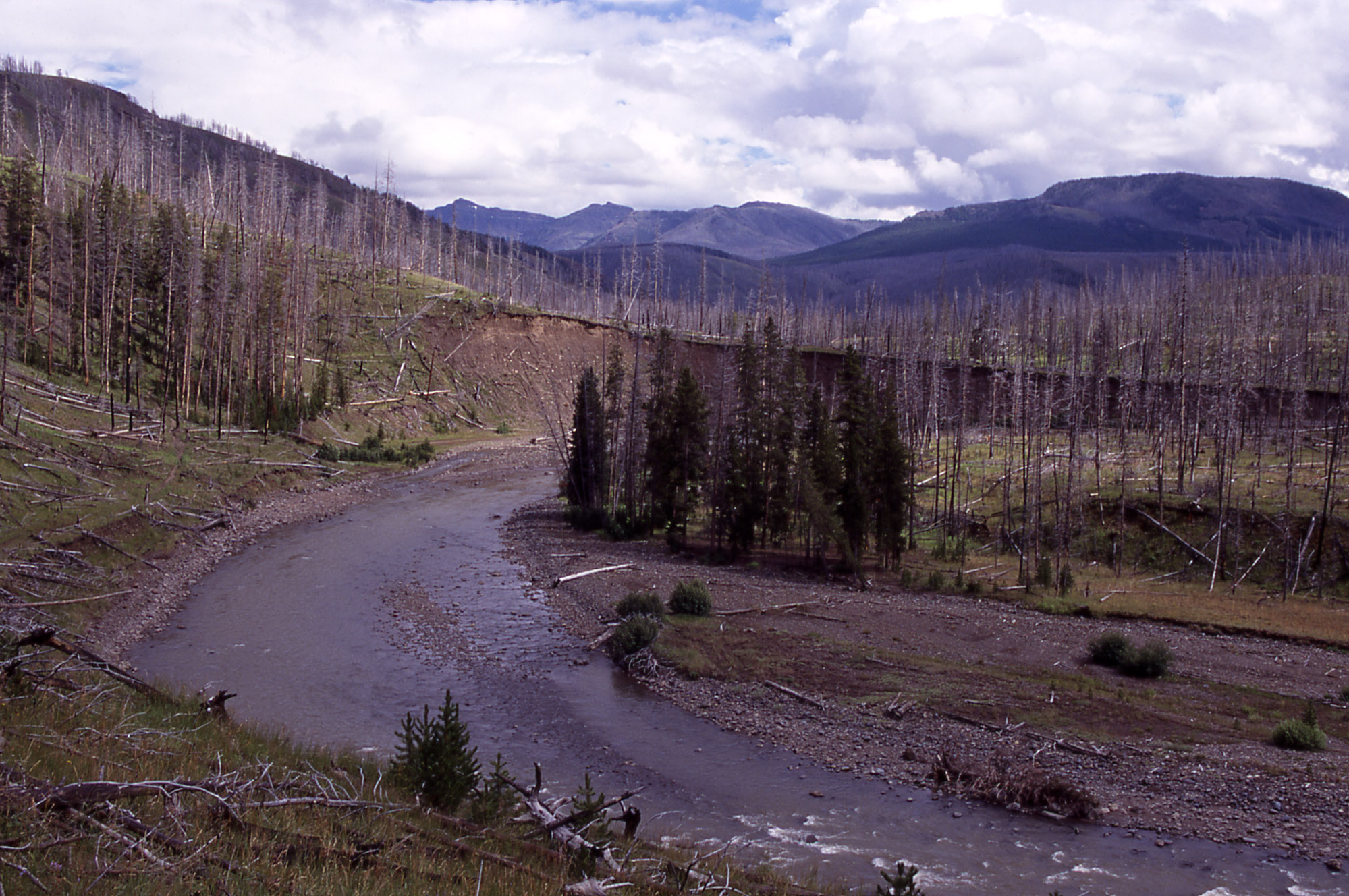
- The Lamar River in 1998 showing trees burned in the 1988 wildfires

Location
- Country: United States
- State: Wyoming

Physical characteristics
- Source
  - location: Absaroka Range, Wyoming
  - coordinates: 44°21′19″N 109°49′33″W
- Mouth: Yellowstone River
  - location: Tower Junction, Wyoming
  - coordinates: 44°55′45″N 110°24′07″W
- Length: 40 mi (64 km)
- Discharge
  - location: Tower Ranger Station
  - average: 884 cu ft/s (25.0 m^{3}/s)

Basin features
- Tributaries
  - left: Soda Butte Creek
  - right: Slough Creek

The Lamar River is a tributary of the Yellowstone River, approximately 40 miles (64 km) long, in northwestern Wyoming in the United States. The river is located entirely within Yellowstone National Park.

== History ==
Prior to the 1884–85 Geological Survey of the park, the Lamar was known as the East Fork of the Yellowstone River. During that survey, Geologist Arnold Hague named the river for L.Q.C. (Lucius Quintius Cincinnatus) Lamar, then Secretary of the Interior (March 1885 – January 1888), and a former slaveholder and author of the Mississippi Ordinance of Secession. The Lamar Valley, or the Secluded Valley of Trapper Osborne Russell and other park features or administrative names which contain Lamar are derived from this original naming.

Osborne Russell in his 1921 Journal of a Trapper described the Lamar as follows:

Chapter-VI-In the Yellowstone Country-A Garden of Eden Inhabited By a Small Party of Snake Indians - On the 28th [July 1834] we crossed the mountain in a westerly direction through the thick pines and fallen timber, about twelve miles, and encamped in a small prairie about a mile in circumference. Through this valley ran a small stream in a northerly direction, which all agreed in believing to be a branch of the Yellowstone. 29th-We descended the stream about fifteen miles through the dense forest and at length came to a beautiful valley about eight miles long and three or four wide, surrounded by dark and lofty mountains. The stream, after running through the center in a northwesterly direction, rushed down a tremendous canyon of basaltic rock apparently just wide enough to admit its waters. The banks of the stream in the valley were low and skirted in many places with beautiful cottonwood groves. Here we found a few Snake Indians comprising six men, seven women and eight or ten children, who were the only inhabitants of the lonely and secluded spot.

— Osborne Russell, Journal of a Trapper,1921

In 1869, the Cook–Folsom–Peterson Expedition encountered the Lamar River (East Fork) just upstream from the canyon section flowing into the Yellowstone and traveled upstream to the confluence of Calfee Creek where they camped on September 16, 1869.

== Location and tributaries ==
It rises in the Absaroka Range, on the eastern edge of the park, and flows northwest through the northeast corner of the park. It is joined by many tributary streams, including Soda Butte Creek and Slough Creek and joins the Yellowstone near Tower Junction, below the Grand Canyon of the Yellowstone. The river flows through a portion of the park hit hard by the 1988 wildfires.

== Angling ==
The Lamar River, with its tributaries is a popular destination for fly fishing in Yellowstone Park. The access is very easy and the cutthroat fishing is some of the best in the world. There are some rainbow trout in the river below the road bridge, but the primary fishing throughout the drainage is for Yellowstone cutthroat trout. Cutthroat trout in the Lamar offer good dry fly fishing with heavy hatches of caddis, pale morning duns, and large Green Drakes in July. Terrestrials are prominent in late summer. The Lamar and its tributaries are not usually fishable until about the second week of July, because of high water. The National Park Service has made frequent changes to the regulations for the Lamar and for its tributaries including Slough Creek and Soda Butte, and in 2018 has made significant new changes. Anglers are now required to kill all non-native fish, including rainbow trout, brook trout, and identifiable rainbow/cutthroat hybrids throughout the Lamar drainage. On page 14 of the 2018 regulations they still say that if it has a red slash put it back, but that is clearly superseded by the region specific requirement that if a fish landed in the Lamar drainage is clearly identifiable as a hybrid then it must be killed, even if it has a red slash, with the caveat that "if you don't know, let it go." Another significant change to the Park-wide fishing regulations is that felt soles are no longer permitted on waders. Other Park-wide regulations, that continue from previous years, are that barbed hooks, lead weights, lead split shot, and live bait are banned.

== Wildlife ==
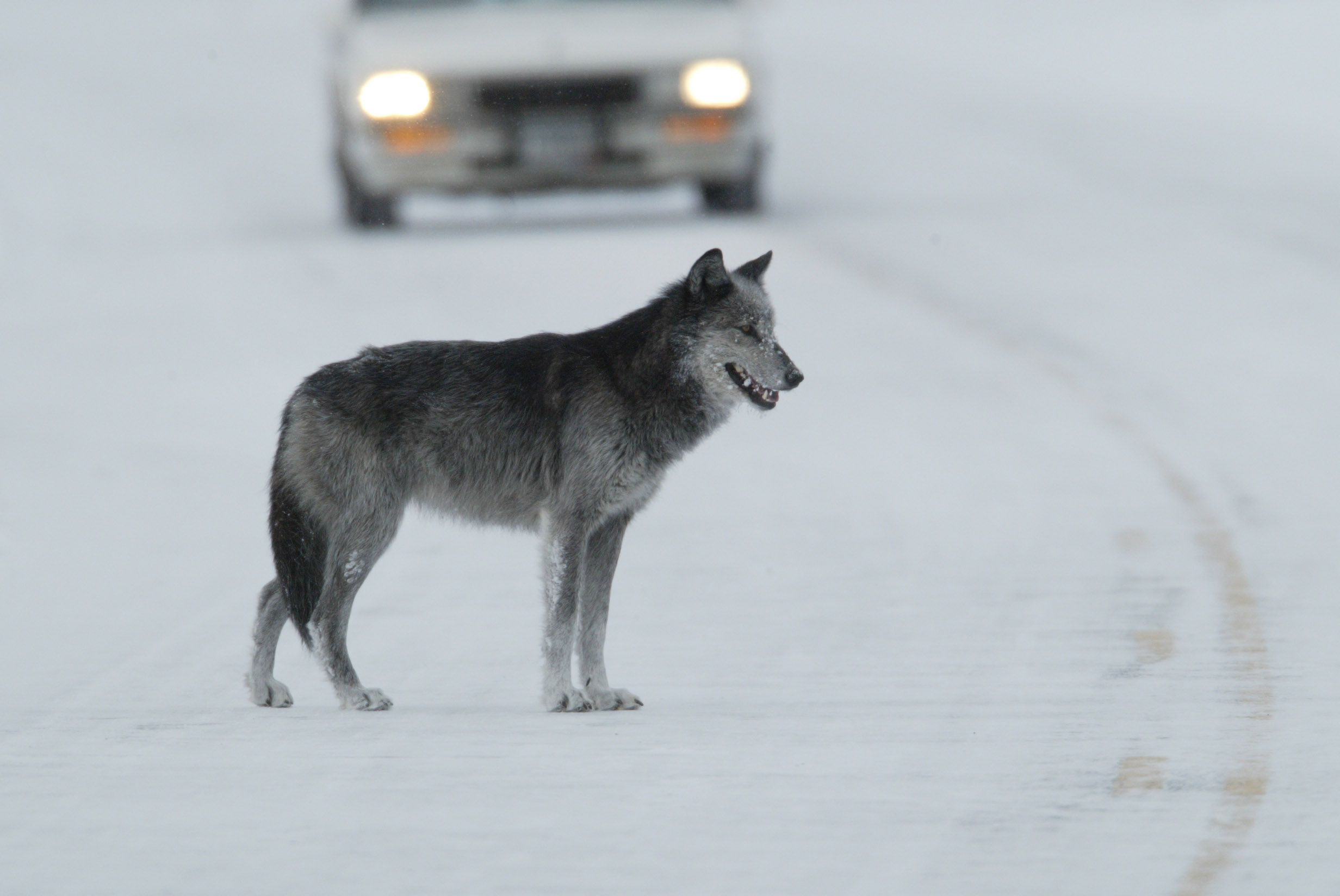
A black and gray female wolf on the roadway near the Lamar River bridge

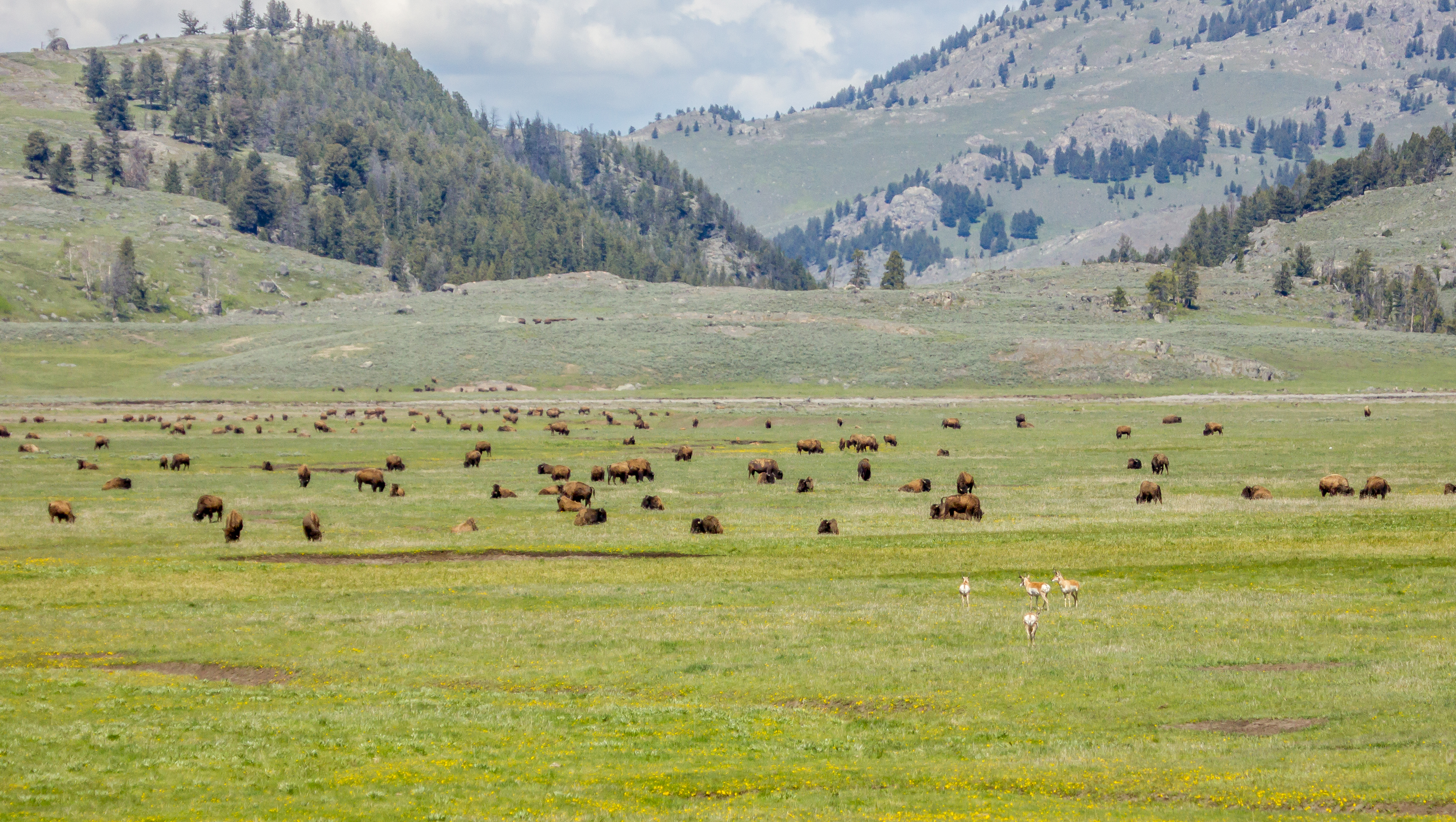
A herd of bison and pronghorn in Lamar Valley

Along the river, there are pronghorn, bison, and bear within the area of the Lamar River Valley. Around the world, it is one of the most consistent environments to view wolves. There are two famous wolf packs in the area. The Lamar Canyon and Junction Butte wolf packs inhabit the area along the Lamar River. and is widely known as one of the best places in Yellowstone National Park to view wildlife, especially grizzly bears and wolves. Three locations in the valley—Soda Butte, Crystal Creek and Rose Creek were the sites for the 1995 re-introduction of wolves into Yellowstone. Birds in the area include osprey and bald eagle. The area along the Lamar River is often referred to as America's Serengeti.

== Hiking ==
The Lamar River Trail is a seven mile long round-trip hiking trail. The trail's hiking difficulty is easy and the trip can be completed in one day. Along this trail, it is possible to see the extensive wildlife habitat the area has to offer. Even if one does not hike the entire trail, even only when hiking a few miles you will be near herds of bison along the trail. There are two great campsites, 3L1 and 3L2, along the trail within the area near Cache Creek. However, campsite 3L2 can be hard to access in the spring when the Lamar River is high, as it requires a ford in order to reach it. Along the upper sections of the trail one can find outfitters offering guided trips on horseback to go deep into the wilderness.

== Climate ==
Climate data for Lamar Ranger Station, elev. 6,600 feet (2,000 m)
Month	Jan	Feb	Mar	Apr	May	Jun	Jul	Aug	Sep	Oct	Nov	Dec	Year
Mean daily maximum °F (°C)	24.6 (−4.1)	30.7 (−0.7)	37.5 (3.1)	48.7 (9.3)	60.6 (15.9)	68.4 (20.2)	78.2 (25.7)	76.6 (24.8)	68.0 (20.0)	55.8 (13.2)	37.4 (3.0)	26.8 (−2.9)	51.1 (10.6)
Mean daily minimum °F (°C)	0.8 (−17.3)	4.2 (−15.4)	9.1 (−12.7)	20.0 (−6.7)	27.2 (−2.7)	33.3 (0.7)	36.3 (2.4)	34.2 (1.2)	27.1 (−2.7)	20.1 (−6.6)	11.1 (−11.6)	1.9 (−16.7)	18.8 (−7.3)
Average precipitation inches (mm)	0.97 (25)	0.63 (16)	0.67 (17)	0.90 (23)	1.45 (37)	2.05 (52)	1.40 (36)	1.36 (35)	1.45 (37)	0.94 (24)	0.79 (20)	0.89 (23)	13.51 (343)
Average snowfall inches (cm)	20.7 (53)	15.0 (38)	13.4 (34)	8.5 (22)	1.9 (4.8)	0.3 (0.76)	0 (0)	0 (0)	1.9 (4.8)	4.0 (10)	10.9 (28)	17.6 (45)	94.2 (239)

Images of the Lamar River
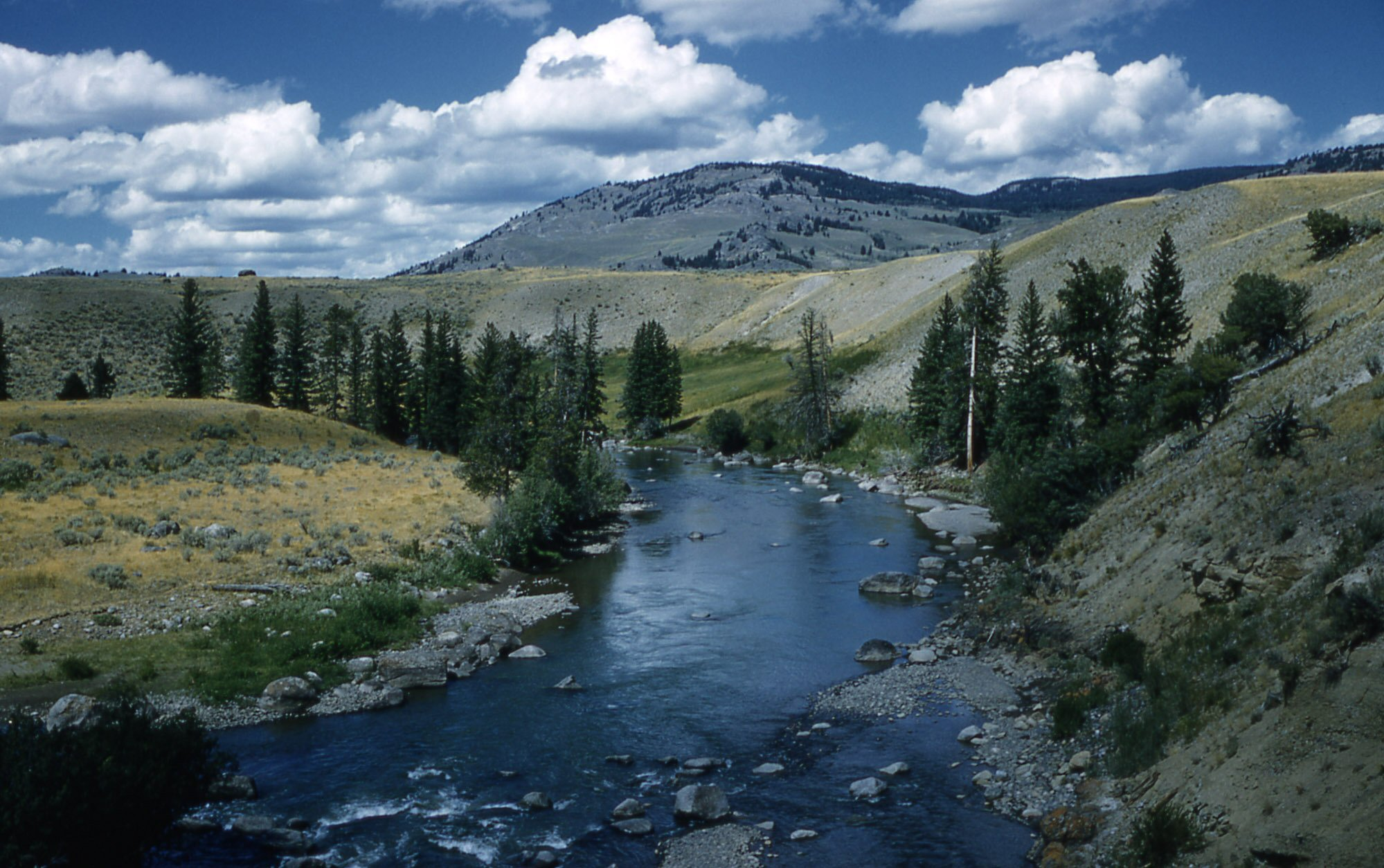
Lamar River, 1959

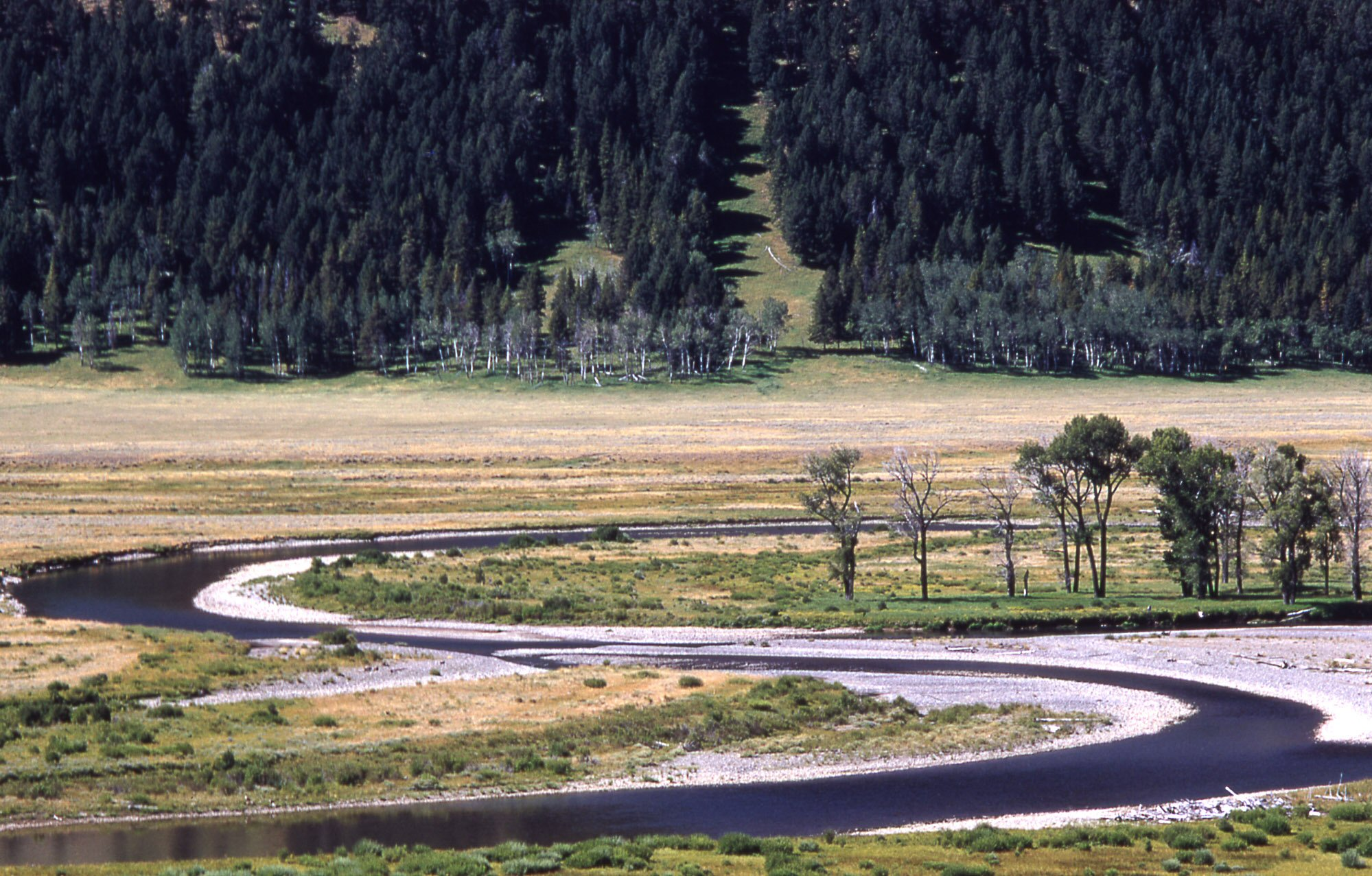
Lamar River, 1969

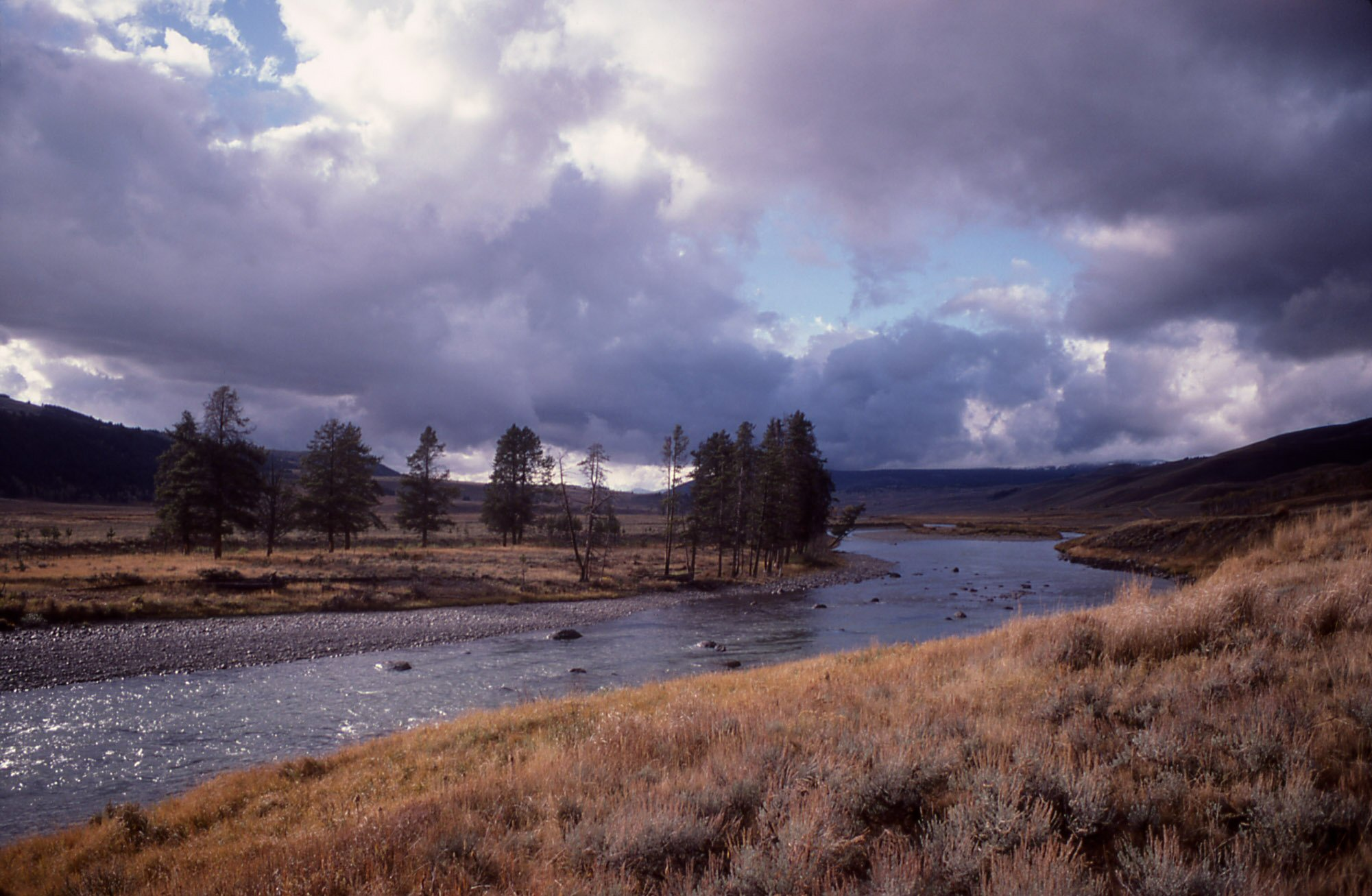
Lamar River, 1977

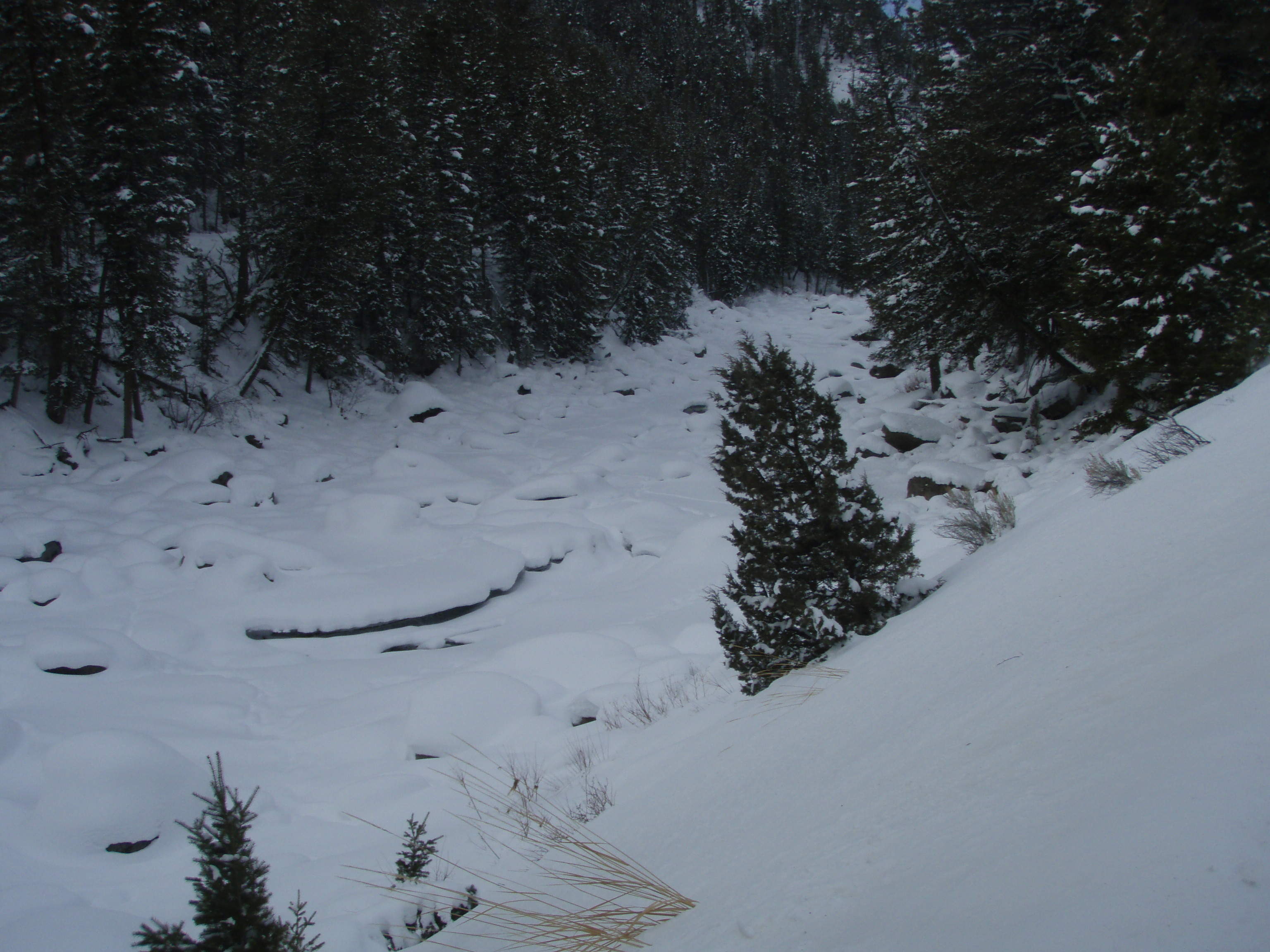
Lamar River, January 2009

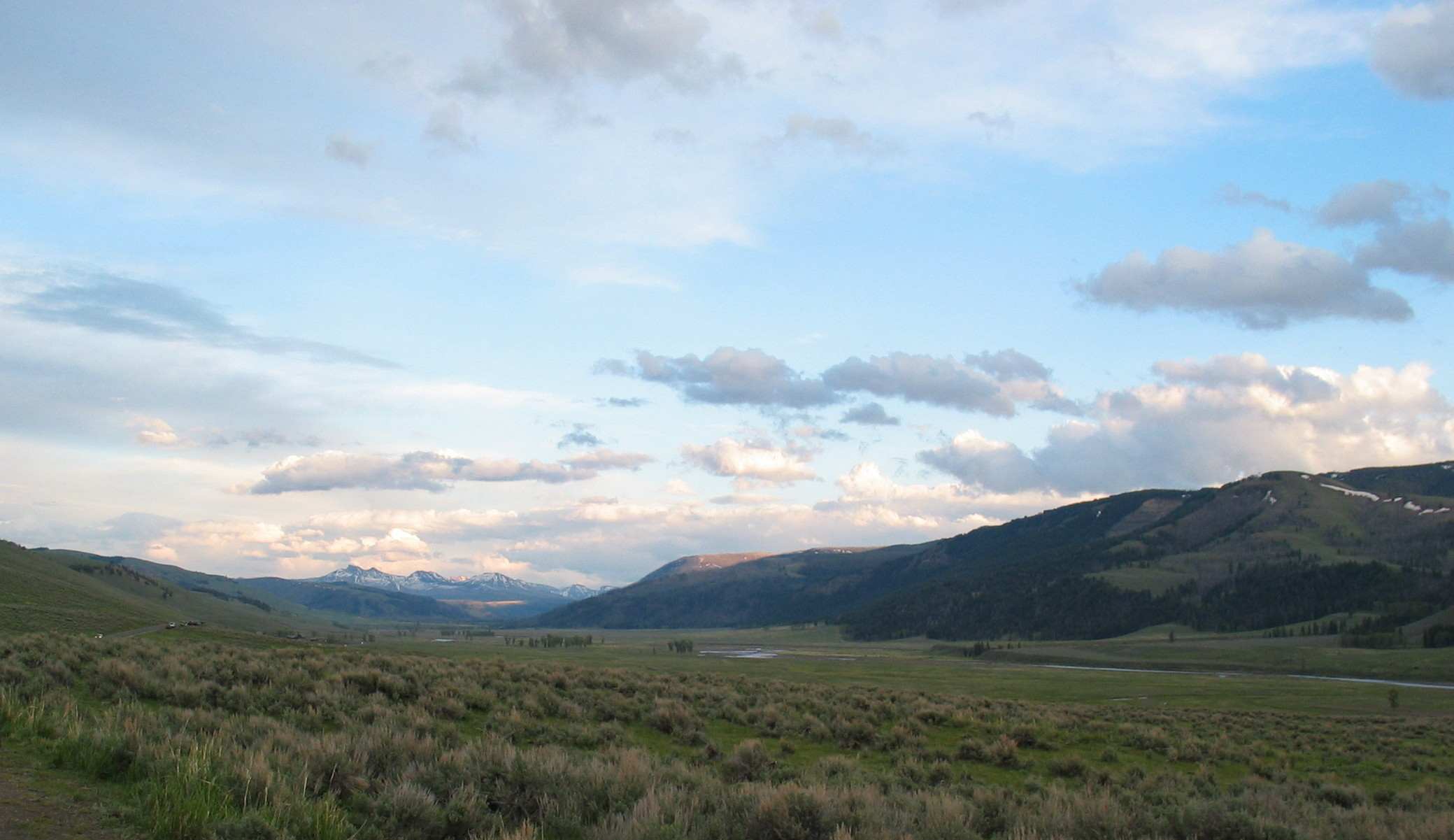
Lamar Valley, Wyoming, 2007, looking east

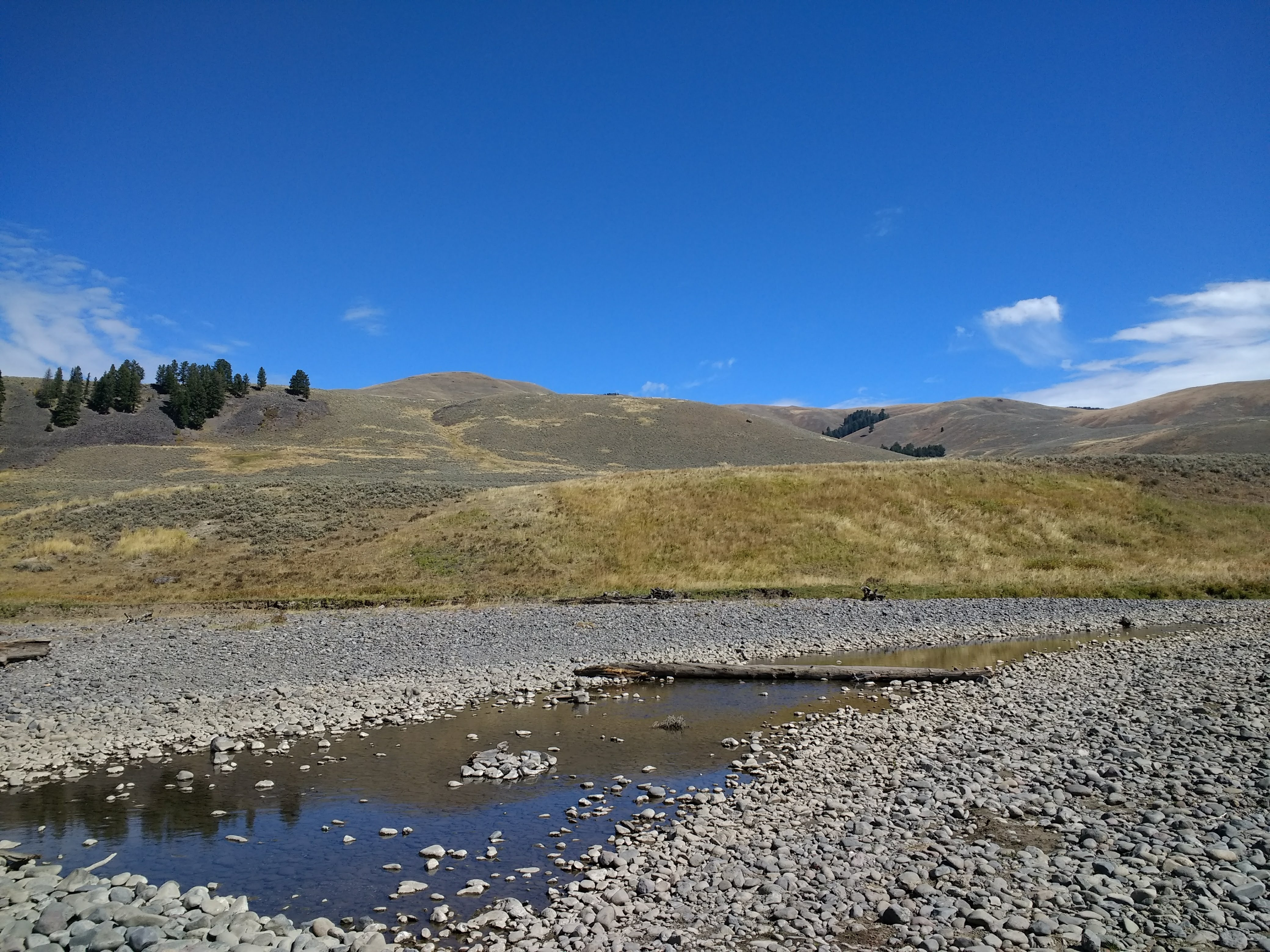
Photo from September 2018 looking from the Lamar River to the northeast toward Bison Peak

== See also ==
- Angling in Yellowstone National Park
- Fishes of Yellowstone National Park
- List of Wyoming rivers
