= Intermittent Spring (Wyoming) =

Spring in Lincoln County, Wyoming, United States

Coordinates: 42°44′40″N 110°50′55″W

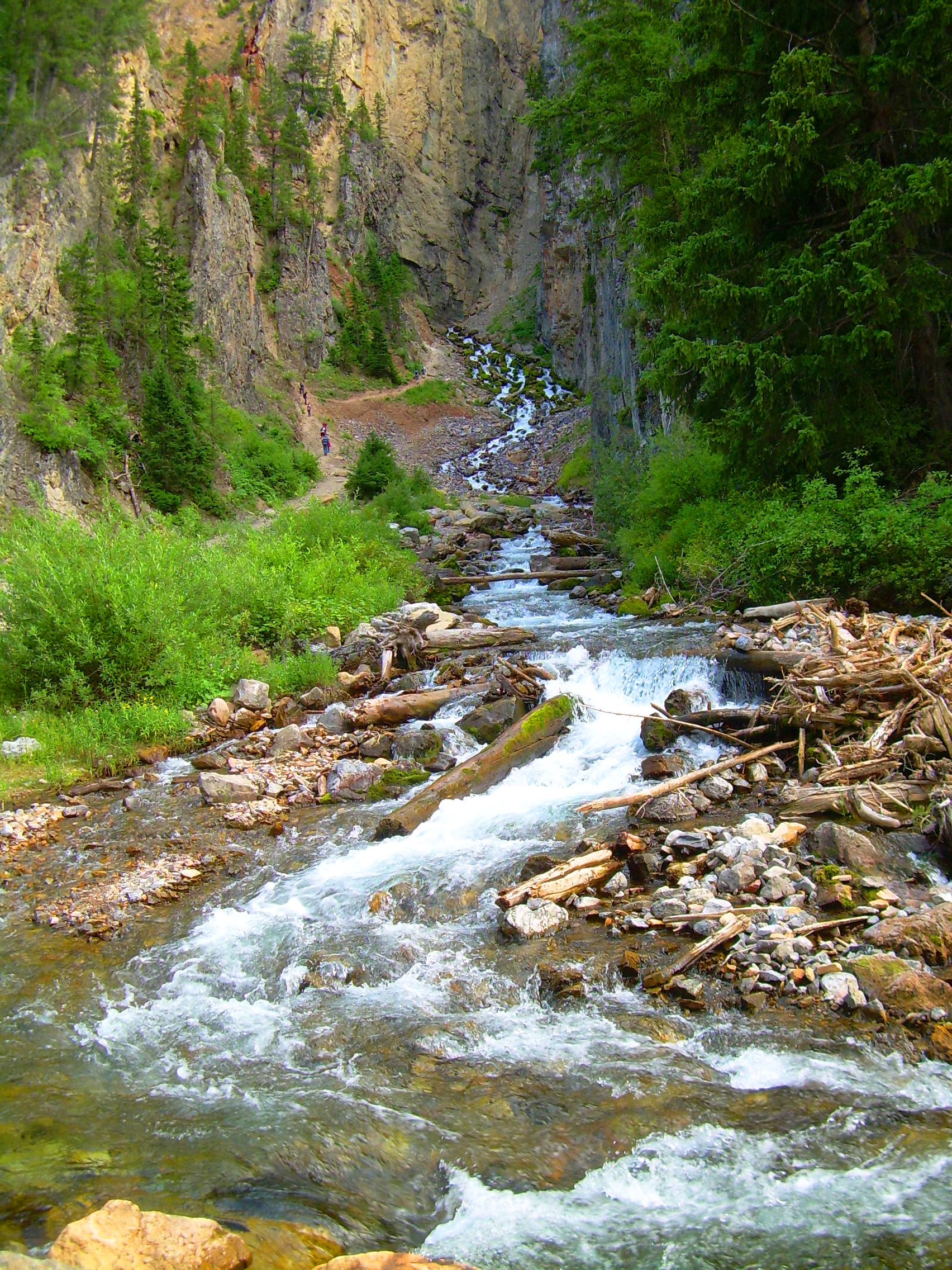
The Periodic Spring of Afton, Wyoming

Intermittent Spring, also called Periodic Spring, is located in Swift Creek canyon in the Star Valley, near Afton, Wyoming. It is the largest rhythmic spring in the world.

The great-great-grandfather of Rulon Gardner is credited with the discovery. Gardner says, "He was up there logging. He went up and found a nice little place to get some fresh water. It was intermittent. It went and stopped. So it was pretty amazing".

== Siphon theory ==
The theory is that as groundwater flows continuously into a cavern, it fills a narrow tube that leads out. As it pours over the high point of the tube, it creates a siphon effect, sucking water out of the chamber. Eventually air rushes in and breaks the siphon. Kip Solomon, a hydrologist at the University of Utah, said, "We can't think of another explanation at the moment".

When the University of Utah conducted and finished their studies, Solomon concluded that "The spring water's gas content has now been tested at the University of Utah. The data strongly suggests the water was exposed to air underground; strong support for the siphon theory."

== See also ==
- Gihon Spring, another well-known rhythmic spring, located in the ancient City of David
- Salt River Range

== Sources ==
- "Visit one of Star Valley's Attractions: the Intermittent Springs", Star Valley Wyoming Online, Valley Computer Services, archived from the original on 2011-07-16
- "Periodic Intermittent Spring", WyomingTourism.org, Wyoming Travel & Tourism, State of Wyoming, archived from the original on 2012-04-03
- "The World's Largest Rhythmic Spring". Atlas Obscura.
- "Discover Afton's Freshwater Spring that Breathes". Vist Afton. 2023-01-09.
