= Little Medicine Bow River =

Coordinates: 41°58′01″N 106°17′36″W

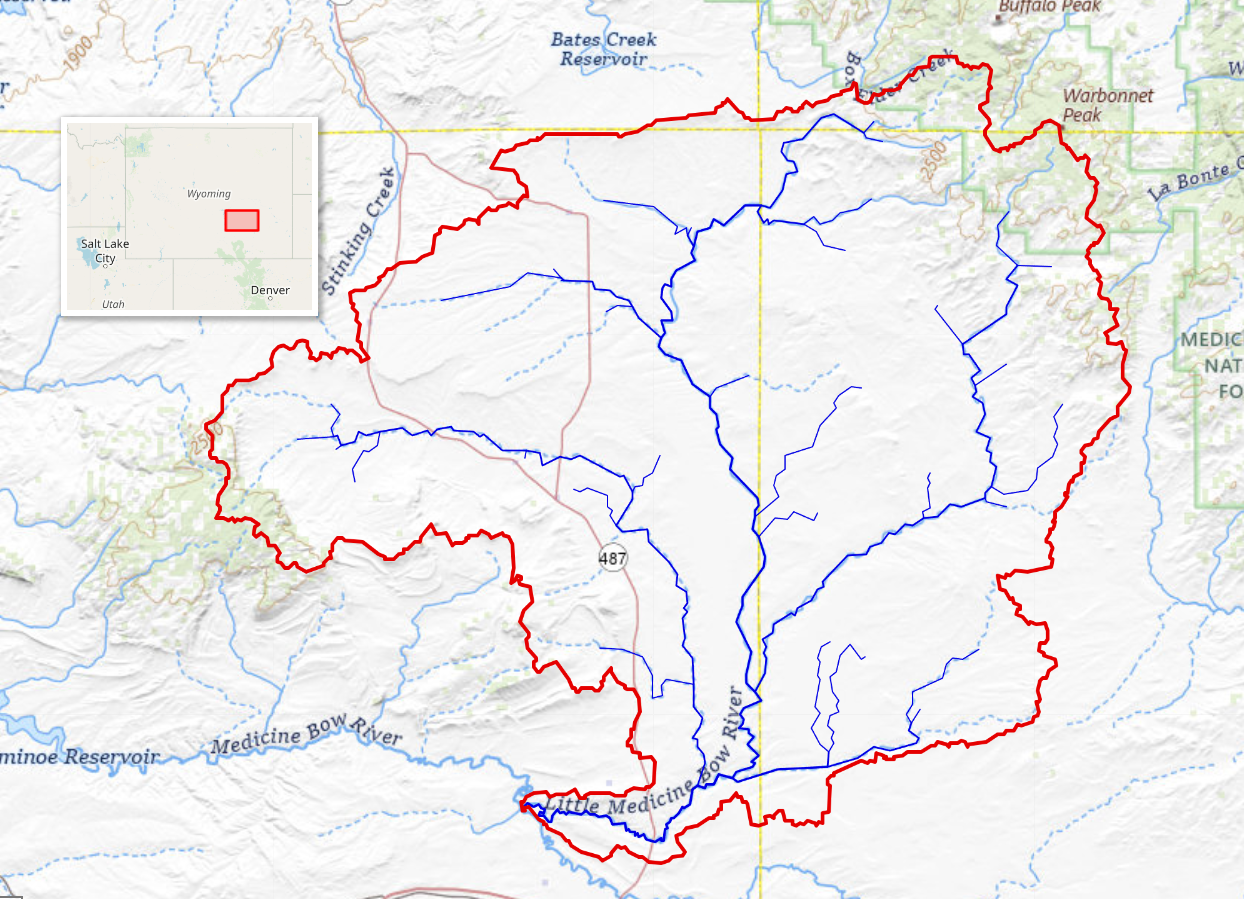

The Little Medicine Bow River is a 66-mile-long (106 km) tributary of the Medicine Bow River in Wyoming. The basin of the Little Medicine Bow includes the northern slopes of the Shirley Mountains as well Shirley Basin. The Little Medicine Bow reaches its confluence with the Medicine Bow River 6 miles (10 km) northwest of the town of Medicine Bow.

== See also ==
- List of Wyoming rivers
