= Crow Creek (South Platte River tributary) =

Physical characteristics
- Source
  - coordinates: 41°10′19″N 105°04′51″W
- Mouth
  - location: Confluence with South Platte
  - coordinates: 40°23′11″N 104°29′35″W
  - elevation: 4,557 ft (1,389 m)

Basin features
- Progression: South Platte—Platte— Missouri—Mississippi

Crow Creek is a 153-mile-long (246 km) creek and minor waterway of southeastern Wyoming and northern Colorado. Crow Creek is formed at the confluence of the South Fork of Crow Creek with the Middle Fork, followed by the addition of the North Fork about 1.5 miles (2.4 km) downstream. All the major tributaries of Crow Creek begin in the Laramie Range and flow eastward. The headwaters of the North Fork are dammed to form the North Crow Reservoir which supplies the city of Cheyenne, Wyoming. Middle Fork is also dammed, forming the Granite Reservoir and Crystal Reservoir which also supply Cheyenne. South Fork is the only unobstructed section and flows most of the year, but not all the way to Cheyenne. Other tributaries of Crow Creek below the reservoirs are Sand Creek, Spring Creek and Brush Creek, none of which flow year round. Crow Creek continues in an eastward direction passing through the city of Cheyenne, and then heads east and south into Colorado where it eventually flows into the South Platte River.

== See also ==
- List of rivers of Wyoming
- List of rivers of Colorado
