= North Fork Little Snake River =

Physical characteristics
- Source
  - coordinates: 41°04′12″N 106°53′46″W
- Mouth
  - location: Confluence with Middle Fork
  - coordinates: 40°59′36″N 107°02′51″W
  - elevation: 7,001 ft (2,134 m)

Basin features
- Progression: Little Snake—Yampa— Green—Colorado

North Fork Little Snake River is a 13.1-mile-long (21.1 km) tributary of the Little Snake River in Colorado and Wyoming. It flows from a source in the Medicine Bow National Forest of Carbon County, Wyoming to a confluence with the Middle Fork Little Snake River in Routt County, Colorado that forms the Little Snake River.

== See also ==
- List of rivers of Colorado
- List of rivers of Wyoming
- List of tributaries of the Colorado River
