= Rock Creek Roadless Area =

Area of Bighorn National Forest in Wyoming

Coordinates: 44.4412°N 107.0153°W

- IUCN category V (protected landscape/seascape)
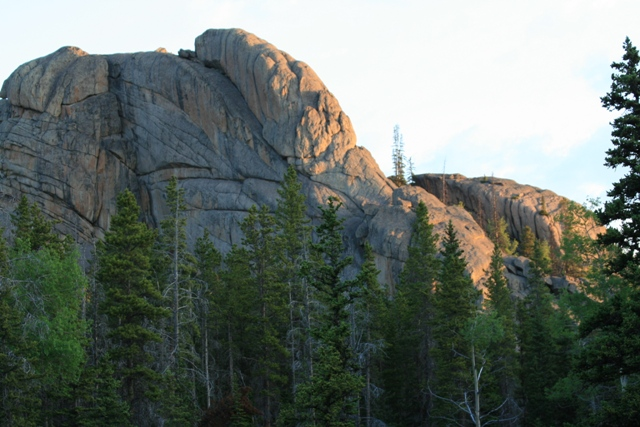
- Harvey's Peak at sunset
- Location: Bighorn Mountains, north of Buffalo, WY, Johnson County, northeastern Wyoming.
- Nearest city: Saddlestring
- Governing body: USFS

The Rock Creek Roadless Area (B032) is located northwest of Buffalo, Wyoming, in the Bighorn National Forest. It comprises roughly 34,000 acres (140 km^{2}) of forested lands, mountain parks, steep canyons, and large rock formations. This area prairie land to high alpine peaks. The north, middle, and south forks of Rock Creek, Balm of Gilead Creek, Pheasant Creek, and Ditch Creek originate here. The area is flanked on the eastern side by the Bud Love Big Game Winter Range and the HF Bar Ranch Historic District and on the southern side by the Paradise Guest Ranch. It is home to elk, moose, mountain lion, pine marten, blue grouse, ruffed grouse, and raptors. Lodgepole pine, some ponderosa, and aspen stands with low-growing juniper in the undergrowth dominate the area. The ruggedness of the terrain and the resulting high cost of development have discouraged road-building.

In the 1990s areas to the north, south, and east of Rock Creek were assessed for oil and gas production. The area has a very low potential for natural resource and mineral exploitation.

== Roadless Area definition ==
A roadless area is the designation for backcountry, undeveloped lands having wilderness attributes as specified in the Wilderness Act of 1964 and that could be considered for inclusion in the National Wilderness Preservation System. The Rock Creek area was inventoried in the Roadless Area Review and Evaluation process (RARE II) and managed under the land management plans of the US Forest Service. The Roadless Area Conservation Rule was a federal regulation that was adopted by the U.S. Forest Service shortly before President William Clinton left office on Jan. 12, 2001. It allowed reasonable exceptions for management activities like fire suppression and other public health safety measures, and permitted projects, such as grazing and mining, with valid existing rights to proceed. At the same time, the national roadless rule attempted to conserve fish and wildlife habitat while not closing any existing access to these lands. At issue are 58.5 million acres (236,000 km²), located in 42 states, but primarily in the West. Within 24 hours of taking office, President Bush's appointees began their campaign, with the timber industry, to undo this new rule. In May 2005, the Bush administration repealed the Roadless Rule, replacing it with a process that allows governors to petition the Forest Service for protection of the national forest roadless lands within their states, but giving the federal government the power to reject the petitions. The states of California, Oregon, New Mexico, and Washington successfully challenged the Bush roadless rule, resulting in reinstatement of the Clinton rule in 2006, the Roadless Area Conservation Rule was re-established. This rule set national guidelines limiting backcountry timber harvest and road construction and reconstruction with a goal of upholding the roadless characteristics found on millions of acres of inventoried roadless areas. The state of Wyoming and the Colorado Mining Association are currently involved in a lawsuit with the 10th U.S. Circuit Court of Appeals on the basis that the 2001 federal rule banning construction of new roads on National Forest land violates the law.

Although Rock Creek is protected from development through a roadless designation, roadless status is constantly under review and revocation. During the RARE (Roadless Area Review and Evaluation) II revision the Rock Creek roadless area was reduced from 51,000 acres was to 34,000 acres and illegal ORV roads that continued past the original southern boundary were inventoried and assimilated into the Forest Service Road system.

== Wilderness Designation ==
The Rock Creek roadless area was the last area to be removed from the 1984 Wyoming Wilderness Act due to its potential for water storage and oil and gas development. Dick Cheney has been quoted saying:

the Wyoming Wilderness Act was one of my proudest achievements as a member of congress ... We set aside a part of Wyoming, nearly a million acres of wilderness that ought to be separate and not developed. We think that was important.

The US Forest Service recommended the Rock Creek area for wilderness designation in its 2005 Revised Land & Resource Management Plan. If the Rock Creek area is designated wilderness it will be assimilated and added to the Cloud Peak Wilderness Area. Congresswoman Cynthia Lummis toured the area in 2009 and when asked about her position regarding the recommendation for designating the Rock Creek roadless area as wilderness, she stated she would support the decisions of the local Johnson County Commissioners. On March 16, 2010, Albert L. "Smokey" Wildeman moved to adopt Resolution #399 opposing the proposal for "Wilderness Designation" in the Rock Creek area. Delbert Eitel seconded, and the motion was carried.

In early September 2010, videographer Melinda Binks and reporter Rebecca Huntington from Assignment Earth documented the Rock Creek Area on horseback. Highlighting outfitter Robert Granstrom of Buffalo Mountain Outfitters and Wyoming Wilderness Association employees advocating for wilderness designation.

Late September 2010, 9 volunteers and staff of the Wyoming Wilderness Association traveled to Washington, D.C. to speak with the states congressional officials. Although legislation has yet to come from the visit, the event brought widespread awareness about wilderness across the US through the Campaign for America's Wilderness' Wilderness Week.
