= Wolverine Creek =

Stream in Bourbon County, Kansas, U.S.

Coordinates: 37.865873°N 94.684683°W

There are several Wolverine Creeks in the United States.

In Kansas, Wolverine Creek is a stream in Bourbon County. It was named for the wolves seen there by early settlers.

In Wyoming, Wolverine Creek is a remote drainage in the Teton Wilderness Area, south of the latter's border with Yellowstone National Park. Its headwaters are south of the southern terminus of Big Game Ridge and both west and northwest of Gravel Peak. Wolverine Creek waters flow generally northwest into Yellowstone National Park, where it drains into the Snake River about 9 miles east of Yellowstone's south entrance.

== See also ==
- List of rivers of Kansas
