= Little Snake River =

River in Carbon County, Wyoming and Moffat County, Colorado in the United States

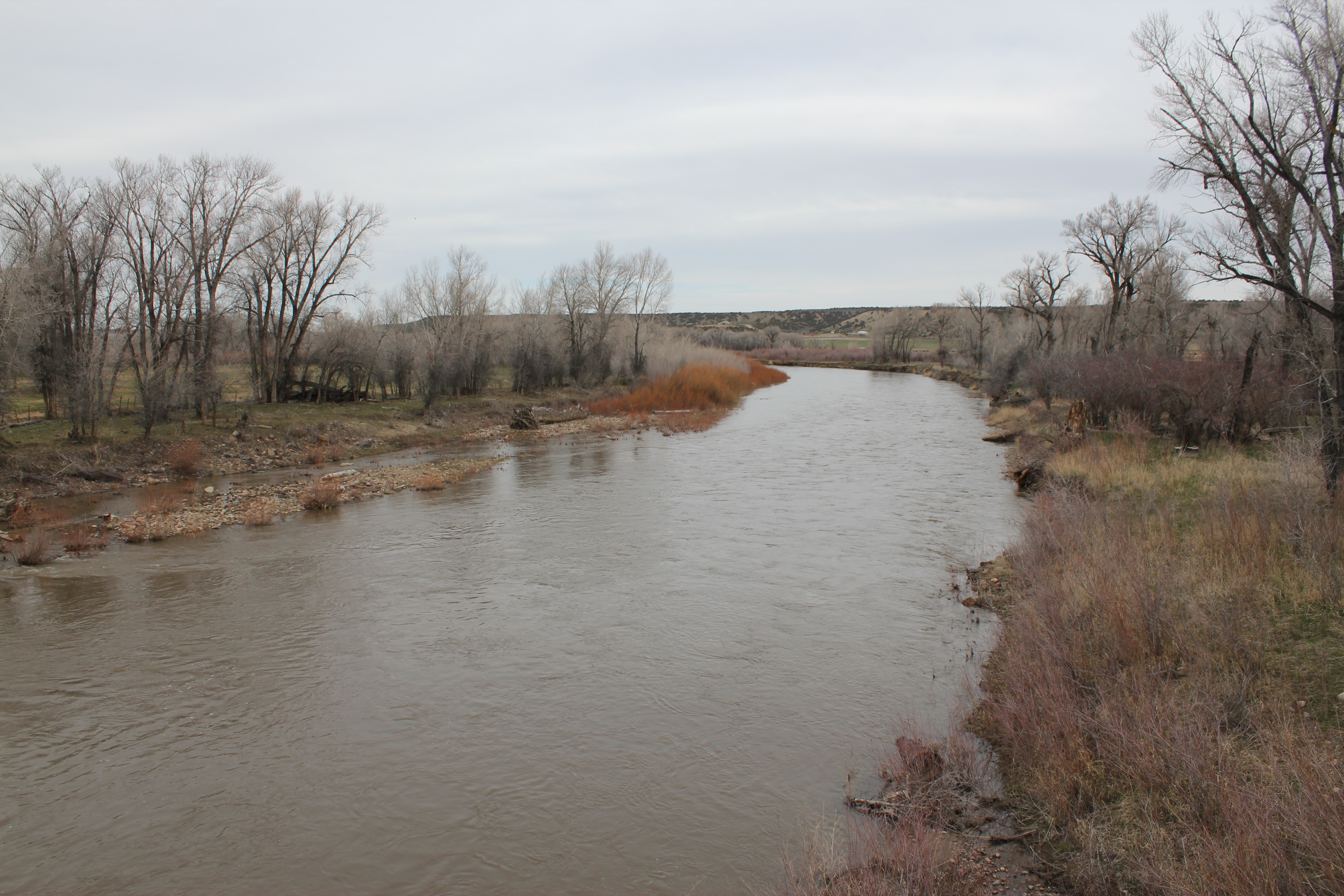
- The river as it passes under Wyoming Highway 70 near Dixon

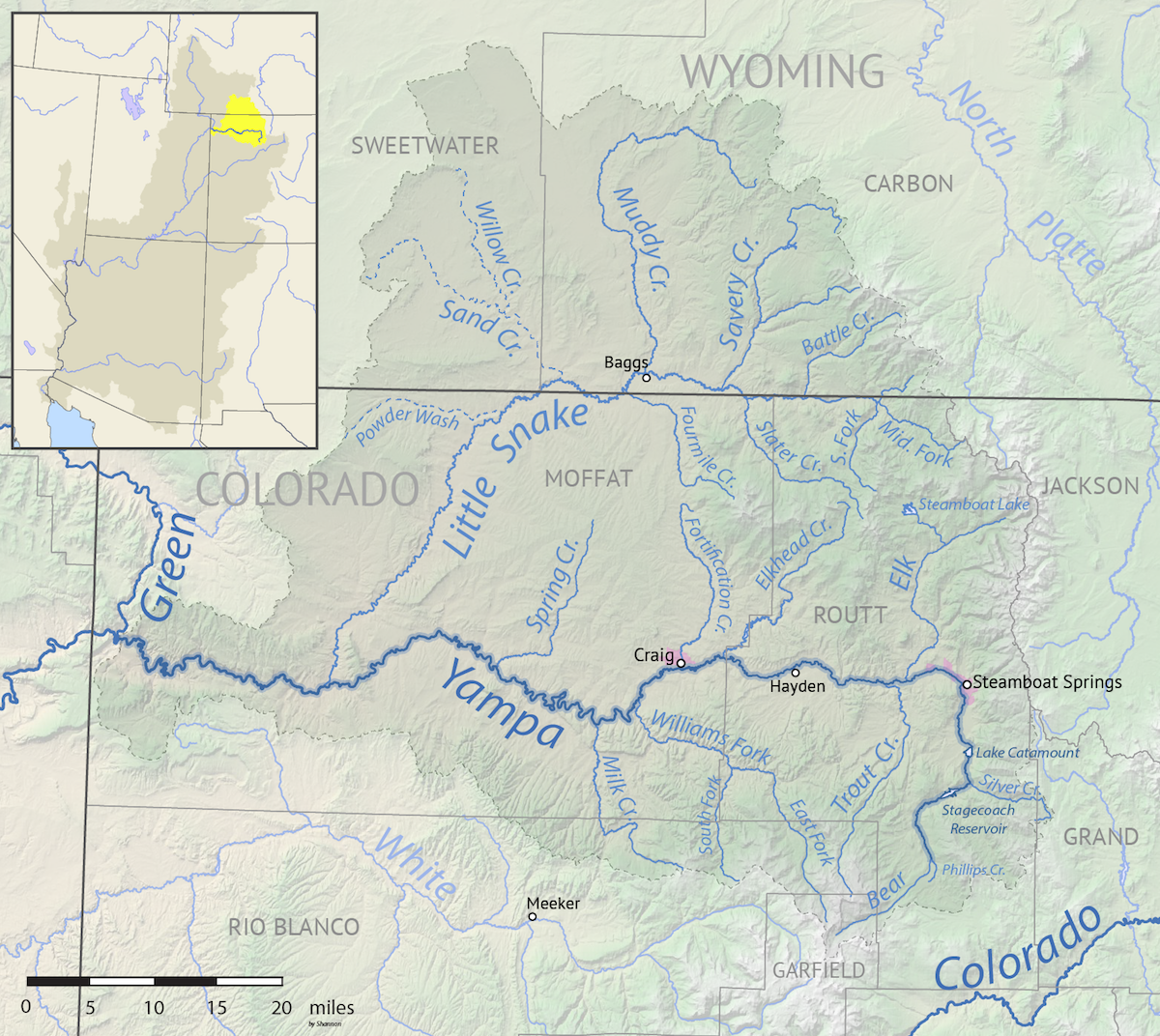

Physical characteristics
- Source
  - location: Confluence of Middle Fork and North Fork
  - coordinates: 40°59′36″N 107°02′51″W
  - elevation: 7,001 ft (2,134 m)
- Mouth
  - location: Confluence with Yampa River
  - coordinates: 40°27′09″N 108°26′32″W
  - elevation: 5,620 ft (1,710 m)

Basin features
- Progression: Yampa—Green—Colorado

The Little Snake River is a tributary of the Yampa River, approximately 155 miles (249 km) long, in southwestern Wyoming and northwestern Colorado in the United States.

== Description ==
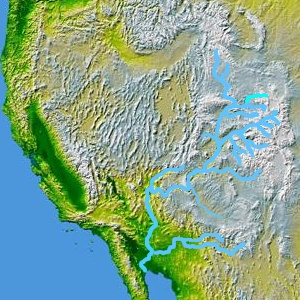
The Little Snake River, a tributary of the Yampa River, is shown highlighted on a map of the western United States.

The river rises near the continental divide, in Routt National Forest in northern Routt County, Colorado, along the northern edge of the Park Range. It flows west along the Wyoming-Colorado state line, meandering across the border several times and flowing past the Wyoming towns of Dixon and Baggs. It turns southwest and flows through Moffat County, Colorado, joining the Yampa approximately 45 mi (72 km) west of Craig, just east of Dinosaur National Monument.

The Little Snake is not generally navigable except seasonally in years of plentiful water.

== See also ==
- List of rivers of Colorado
- List of rivers of Wyoming
- List of tributaries of the Colorado River
