= Libby Creek (Wyoming) =

Stream in Wyoming, United States

Coordinates: 41°19′09″N 106°08′42″W

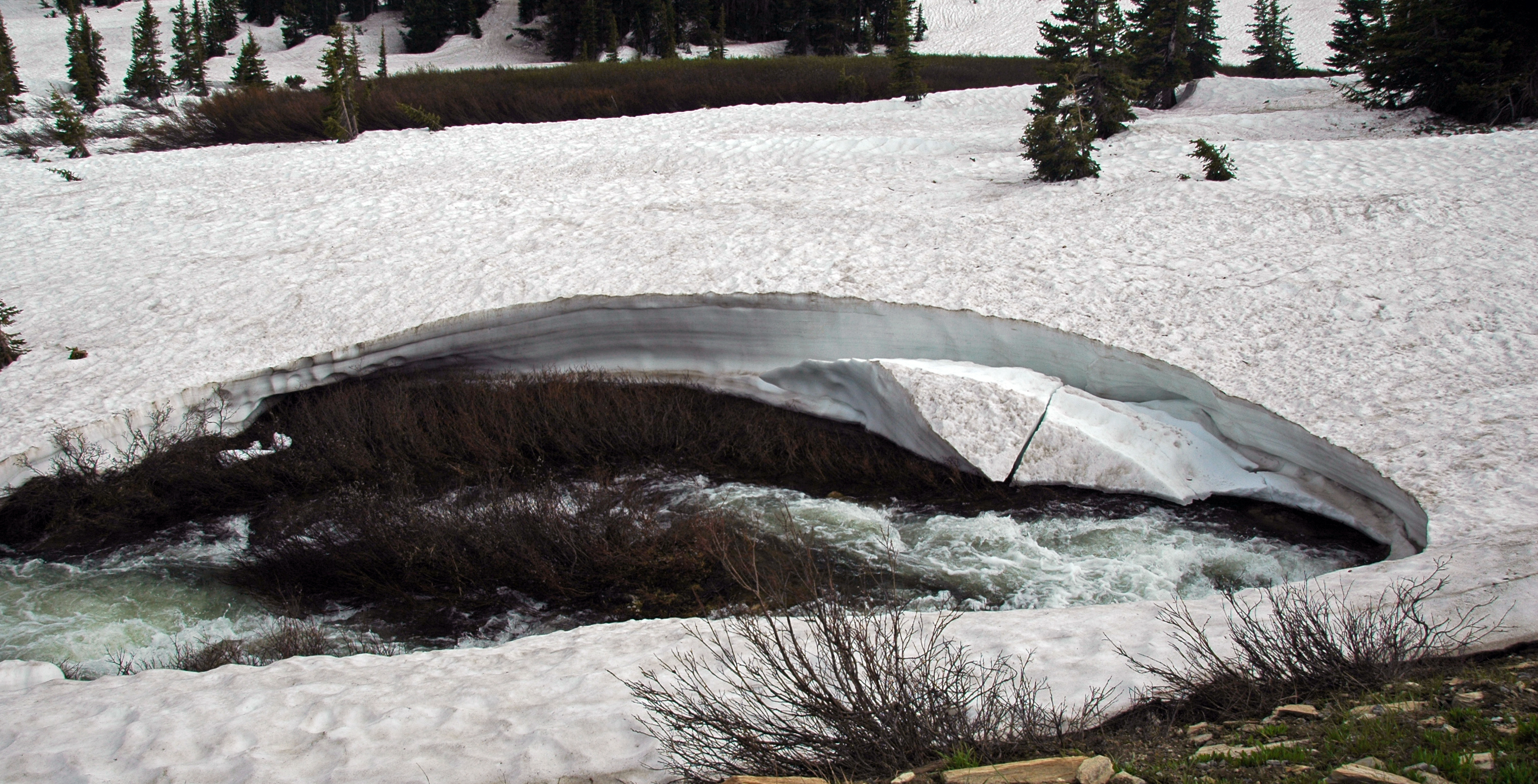
In early July 2011, melting snow near the summit of Wyoming's Medicine Bow Mountains resulted in Libby Creek being in high flow. Downstream is to the left.

The Libby Creek is a 10.1-mile-long (16.3 km) stream on the eastern slopes of the Snowy Range in southern Wyoming. Libby Creek starts as it flows out of Libby Lake and flows violently down the east side of the Snowies until it empties into the North Fork of the Little Laramie.

== See also ==
- List of Wyoming rivers
