= Middle Fork Little Snake River =

Physical characteristics
- Source
  - coordinates: 40°55′27″N 106°49′30″W
- Mouth
  - location: Confluence with North Fork
  - coordinates: 40°59′36″N 107°02′51″W
  - elevation: 7,001 ft (2,134 m)

Basin features
- Progression: Little Snake—Yampa— Green—Colorado

Middle Fork Little Snake River is a 17.5-mile-long (28.2 km) tributary of the Little Snake River in Routt County, Colorado. It flows from a source near the Continental Divide in Routt National Forest to a confluence with the North Fork Little Snake River that forms the Little Snake River.

== See also ==
- List of rivers of Colorado
- List of tributaries of the Colorado River
