= Encampment River =

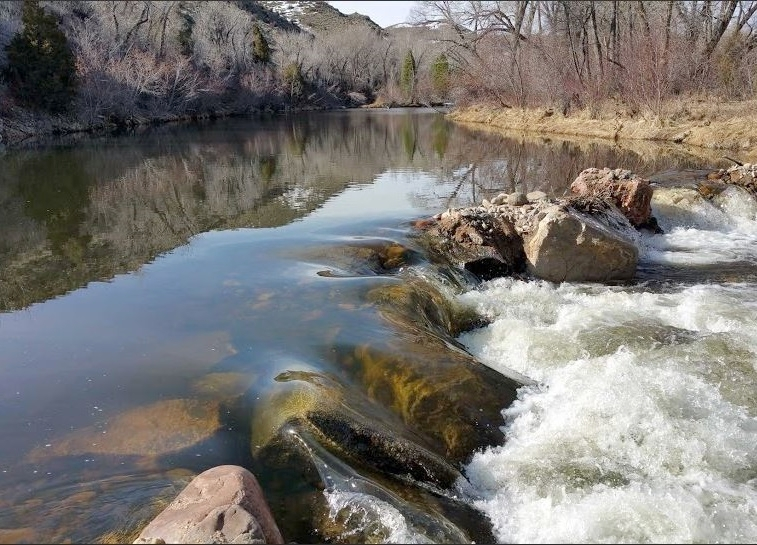
- Encampment River in Wyoming

Physical characteristics
- Source
  - coordinates: 40°52′34″N 106°43′02″W
- Mouth
  - location: Confluence with North Platte
  - coordinates: 41°18′41″N 106°42′59″W
  - elevation: 6,959 ft (2,121 m)

Basin features
- Progression: North Platte—Platte— Missouri—Mississippi
- Tributaries
  - left: Damfino Creek

The Encampment River is a 44.7-mile-long (71.9 km) tributary of the North Platte River. The river's source is in the Mount Zirkel Wilderness east of Buck Mountain in the Park Range of Jackson County, Colorado. The river flows north and passes to the east of the town of Encampment, Wyoming, then through the town of Riverside, Wyoming before its confluence with the North Platte.

== See also ==
- List of rivers of Colorado
- List of rivers of Wyoming
