= Hoback River =

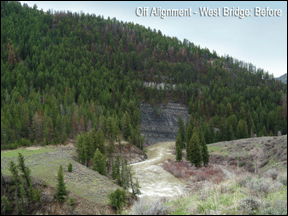
- The river near Hoback Junction

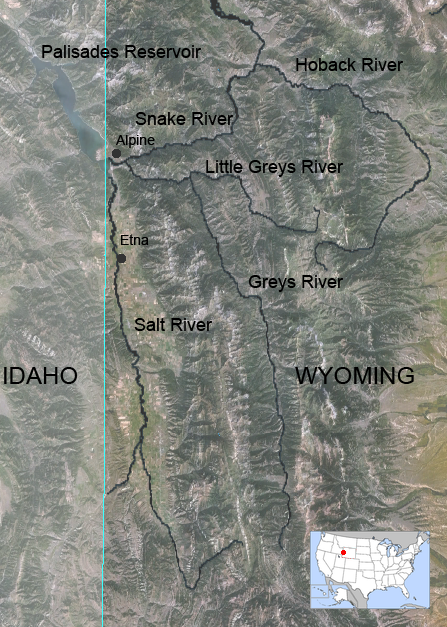
- Map of the Hoback, Greys and Salt rivers (in order from right to left)

Location
- Country: United States

Physical characteristics
- Source
  - location: Hoback Peak at
  - coordinates: 43.0003°N 110.3500°W
- Mouth
  - location: Snake River at
  - coordinates: 43.1913°N 110.4538°W
  - elevation: 5,896 feet (1,797 m)
- Length: 55 miles (89 km)
- Basin size: 600 square miles (1,600 km^{2})
- Discharge
  - location: Jackson, WY
  - average: 511 cuft/s

Basin features
- Progression: North-east then north-west

National Wild and Scenic River

The Hoback River, once called the Fall River, is an approximately 55-mile (89 km)-long tributary of the Snake River in the U.S. state of Wyoming. It heads in the northern Wyoming Range of Wyoming and flows northeast, northwest, and then west through the Bridger-Teton National Forest. Its largest tributary is its South Fork, which joins the Hoback about nine miles downstream of its head as it turns northeast and continues to U.S. Route 191. It then turns northwest, where it spreads onto a large marshy flat in a braided floodplain once known as Jackson's Little Hole, but now referred to as the "Hoback Basin" in which lies the town of Bondurant. It then heads west, entering the steep, narrow Hoback Canyon from which it emerges to join the Snake about 11 miles (18 km) south of Jackson Hole, just upstream of head of the Snake River Canyon near the town of Hoback. The entire length of the Hoback is free flowing and unobstructed by dams. About 30 miles (48 km) downstream from the confluence with the Hoback River, the Snake River crosses into the state of Idaho and is impounded by Palisades Dam.

The river is named after John Hoback, an explorer who traveled with the Astor Expedition from the Snake River, using the Hoback River as a passage to the Green River, a tributary of the Colorado River.

== See also ==
- Greys River
- Salt River
- List of rivers of Wyoming
