= Clear Creek (Wyoming) =

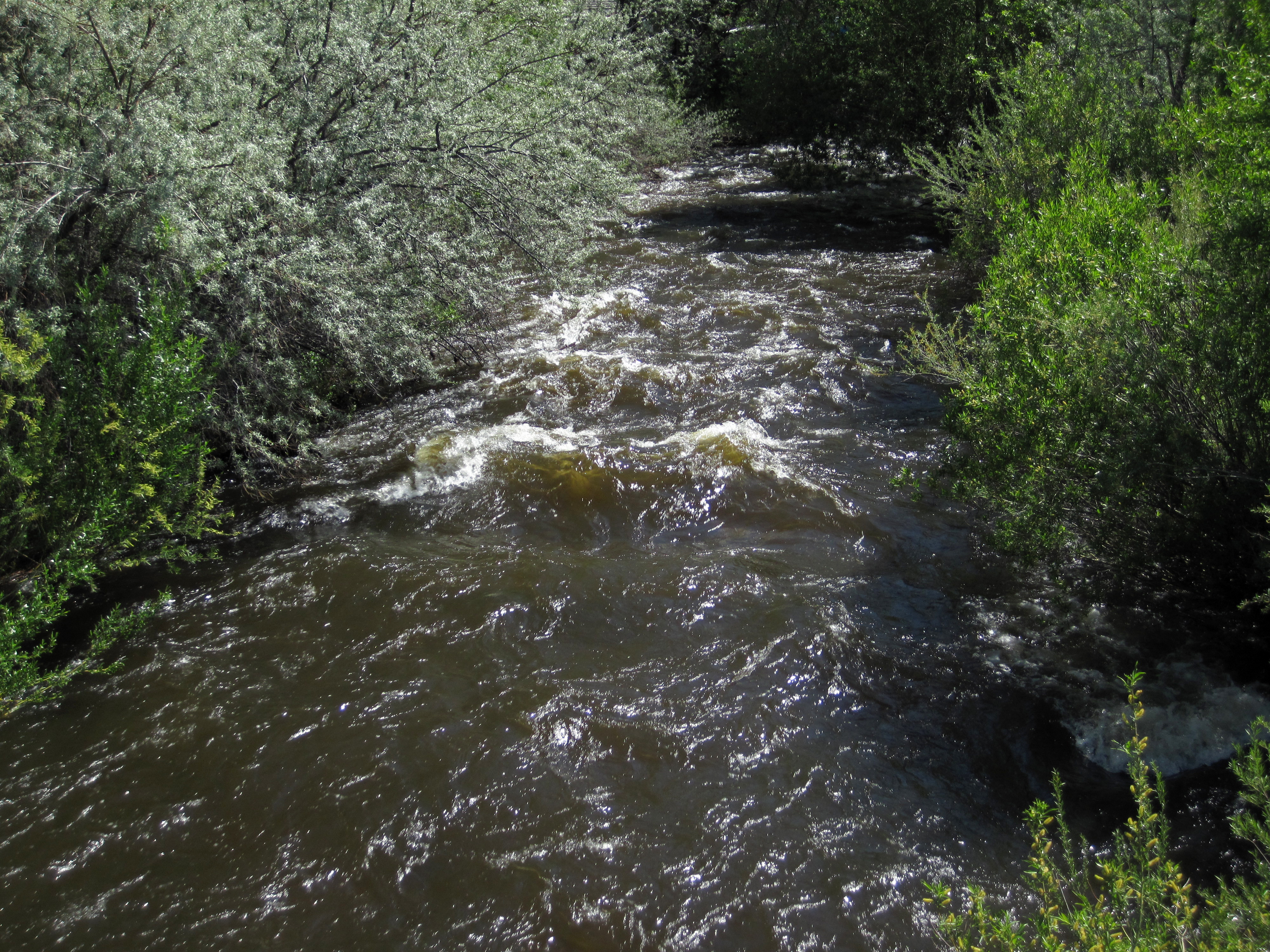
- View to the east from the Rt. 196 bridge in the town of Buffalo

Physical characteristics
- Source
  - location: Bighorn Mountains
  - elevation: 10,500 ft (3,200 m)
- Mouth
  - location: Powder River near Arvada
  - coordinates: 44.6547°N 106.0353°W
  - elevation: 3,642 ft (1,110 m)
- Length: 65 mi (105 km)
- Discharge
  - average: 185 cu ft/s (5.2 m^{3}/s)

Basin features
- Progression: Powder River → Yellowstone River → Missouri River → Mississippi River
- Tributaries: Piney Creek, Rock Creek, French Creek

Clear Creek is a perennial stream located in north-central Wyoming, United States. The creek begins in the Bighorn Mountains west of Buffalo, Wyoming, flowing through Buffalo, and heads northeasterly, eventually emptying into the Powder River.

After passing through Buffalo, the creek heads through the Powder River Basin passing Clearmont and the community of Ucross. It finally discharges into the Powder River in northeastern Sheridan County, several miles north of Arvada.

Significant storage facilities in the Clear Creek watershed include Lake DeSmet, Cloud Peak Reservoir, Willow Park Reservoir, and Tie Hack Reservoir. Clear Creek is utilized for irrigation east of Buffalo on its path to the Tongue River. In the late 19th century, Wyoming’s first state engineer, Elwood Mead, used the Clear Creek adjudication to pioneer the "Doctrine of Prior Appropriation," establishing that water rights must be tied to "beneficial use".

As with other creeks in northeastern Wyoming, the Wyoming Game and Fish stocks Clear Creek with brook trout, cutthroat trout, and rainbow trout.

The city of Buffalo has a trail system along Clear Creek, which is over 20 miles in length.
