= Swift Creek (Wyoming) =

River in Wyoming, United States

Coordinates: 42°44′29″N 110°58′17″W

Swift Creek on a foggy morning.

Swift Creek is a creek in western Wyoming. Swift Creek rises in the Salt River Range and initially runs north before turning sharply westward. The creek then winds down through Swift Creek Canyon and passes through the town of Afton, Wyoming before emptying into the Salt River.

== See also ==
- Intermittent Spring (Wyoming)
