= List of Wyoming state parks =

Map of Wyoming state parks

This is a list of state parks and reserves in the Wyoming state park system operated by the Wyoming Division of State Parks and Historic Sites. (Note: There are 11 state parks in Wyoming in which one could view the Milky Way in some form.)

== State parks and recreation areas ==
| Name | County | Size | | Estab- lished | Image | Remarks |
| Name | County | acres | ha | Estab- lished | Image | Remarks |
|---|---|---|---|---|---|---|
| Bear River State Park | Uinta | 324 | 131 | 1991 | | Within the city limits of Evanston |
| Boysen State Park | Fremont | 35,952 | 14,549 | 1956 | | Surrounds the Boysen Reservoir |
| Buffalo Bill State Park | Park | 11,276 | 4,563 | 1957 | | Surrounds the Buffalo Bill Reservoir |
| Curt Gowdy State Park | Laramie | 3,395 | 1,374 | 1971 | | Recreation on and around three reservoirs |
| Edness K. Wilkins State Park | Natrona | 361 | 146 | 1981 | | On the North Platte River |
| Glendo State Park | Converse, Platte | 18,382 | 7,439 | 1959 | | Surrounds the Glendo Reservoir |
| Guernsey State Park | Platte | 8,631 | 3,493 | 1925 | | Surrounds the Guernsey Reservoir |
| Hawk Springs State Recreation Area | Goshen | 996 | 403 | 1987 | | On Hawk Springs Reservoir |
| Hot Springs State Park | Hot Springs | 1,108.67 | 448.66 | 1897 | | On the Big Horn River in Thermopolis |
| Keyhole State Park | Crook | 15,890 | 6,430 | 1952 | | Surrounds the Keyhole Reservoir |
| Seminoe State Park | Carbon | 20,848 | 8,437 | 1965 | | On the Seminoe Reservoir |
| Sinks Canyon State Park | Fremont | 600 | 240 | 1971 | | Underground river on the Middle Fork of the Popo Agie River |

== State-administered historic sites ==
| Name | Locality | Size | | Image | Remarks |
| Name | Locality | acres | ha | Image | Remarks |
|---|---|---|---|---|---|
| Ames Monument | Albany County | 8.44 | 3.42 | | Pyramid designed by Henry Hobson Richardson, dedicated to Union Pacific Railroad financiers Oakes and Oliver Ames |
| Camp Douglas Officers’ Club | Douglas | 1.5 | 0.61 | | World War II internment camp for prisoners of war |
| Connor Battlefield | Ranchester | 13.2 | 5.3 | | Site of the Battle of the Tongue River |
| Fort Bonneville | Sublette County | 1 | 0.40 | | Fortified winter camp and fur trading post stablished in 1832 by Captain Benjamin Bonneville |
| Fort Bridger | Uinta County | 40 | 16 | | United States Army outpost during the Utah War |
| Fort Fetterman | Converse County | 60.46 | 24.47 | | Ruins of wooden fort constructed in 1867 by the United States Army |
| Fort Fred Steele | Carbon County | 138.5 | 56.0 | | Ruins of fort established in 1868 by the United States Army |
| Fort Phil Kearny | Johnson County | 713.06 | 288.57 | | United States Army outpost from the 1860s on the Bozeman Trail |
| Fort Reno | Johnson County | 14.8 | 6.0 | | Site of wooden fortification established in Dakota Territory by the United States Army in 1865 |
| Granger Stage Station | Granger | 1 | 0.40 | | Station on the Pony Express (1860-1861) and the Overland Trail |
| Historic Governors' Mansion | Cheyenne | .46 | 0.19 | | Governor's mansion from 1905 to 1976 |
| Independence Rock | Natrona County | 202.93 | 82.12 | | Prominent granite landmark for travelers on the Oregon, Mormon, and California trails |
| Legend Rock State Archaeological Site | Hot Springs County | 30.98 | 12.54 | | Near vertical cliff with more than 92 prehistoric petroglyph panels and 300 petroglyph figures |
| Medicine Lodge State Archeological Site | Big Horn County | 200 | 81 | | Sandstone cliff with hundreds of Native American petroglyphs and pictographs |
| Names Hill | Lincoln County | 4.25 | 1.72 | | Bluff near a crossing on the Green River where travelers on the Oregon and California trails carved their names |
| Oregon Trail Ruts | Platte County | 34.17 | 13.83 | | Remnants of the Oregon Trail's westward migration worn into sandstone |
| Piedmont Charcoal Kilns | Uinta County | .886 | 0.359 | | Remnants of the charcoal-making industry in southwestern Wyoming |
| Platte River Crossing | Carbon County | 7 | 2.8 | | Point at which the Overland Trail crossed the North Platte River |
| Point of Rocks Stage Station | Sweetwater County | 1 | 0.40 | | Meeting point of the Overland Trail and the Union Pacific Railroad |
| Quebec-One Missile Alert Facility | Laramie County | 1 | 0.40 | | |
| Register Cliff | Platte County | .16 | 0.065 | | Navigational landmark on the Oregon Trail |
| South Pass City | Fremont County | 345.88 | 139.97 | | Surviving "ghost town" on the Oregon Trail |
| Trail End | Sheridan | 3.76 | 1.52 | | Mansion of cattleman and politician John B. Kendrick |
| Woodruff Cabin Site | Hot Springs County | 1 | 0.40 | | Location of the first European-American settlement in the Big Horn Basin |
| Wyoming Pioneer Memorial Museum | Douglas | 1.4 | 0.57 | | Collections of materials related to the westward expansion |
| Wyoming Territorial Prison | Laramie | 197.4 | 79.9 | | Federal penitentiary from 1872 to 1890; state prison from 1890 to 1901 |

== See also ==
- List of U.S. national parks
- List of U.S. state parks
