= Wyoming Historical Landmarks =

Historical Sites in Wyoming, United States

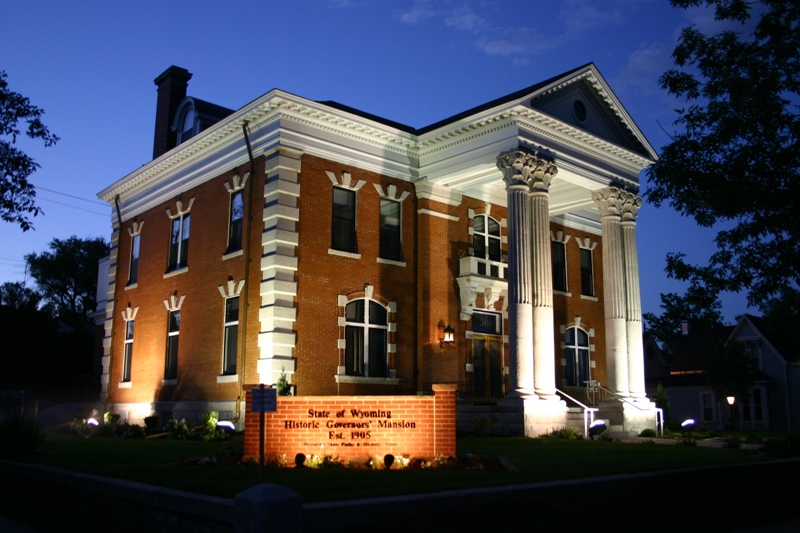
Wyoming Historic Governor's Mansion illuminated at night, at 300 E. 21st St., Cheyenne, Wyoming

Wyoming Historical Landmarks are buildings, structures, sites, or places in the U.S. State of Wyoming that have been determined to have statewide historical landmark significance. The list is made by Wyoming Division of State Parks and Historic Sites and is noted for its historical importance. Many of the sites are also listed on US National list.

== Wyoming Historical Sites ==
Name	Locality	Size		Image	Remarks	
Name	Locality	acres	ha	Image	Remarks	
Ames Monument	Albany County	8.44	3.42		Pyramid designed by Henry Hobson Richardson, dedicated to Union Pacific Railroad financiers Oakes and Oliver Ames .	
Camp Douglas Officers’ Club	Douglas	1.5	0.61		World War II internment camp for prisoners of war	
Connor Battlefield	Ranchester	13.2	5.3		Site of the Battle of the Tongue River."	
Fort Bonneville	Sublette County	1	0.40		Fortified winter camp and fur trading post stablished in 1832 by Captain Benjamin Bonneville	
Fort Bridger	Uinta County	40	16		United States Army outpost during the Utah War	
Fort Fetterman	Converse County	60.46	24.47		Ruins of wooden fort constructed in 1867 by the United States Army	
Fort Fred Steele	Carbon County	138.5	56.0		Ruins of fort established in 1868 by the United States Army	
Fort Phil Kearny	Johnson County	713.06	288.57		United States Army outpost from the 1860s on the Bozeman Trail	added = October 15, 1966
Fort Reno	Johnson County	14.8	6.0		Site of wooden fortification established in Dakota Territory by the United States Army in 1865	
Granger Stage Station	Granger	1	0.40		Station on the Pony Express (1860-1861) and the Overland Trail	
Historic Governors' Mansion	Cheyenne	.46	0.19		Governor's mansion from 1905 to 1976	
Independence Rock	Natrona County	202.93	82.12		Prominent granite landmark for travelers on the Oregon, Mormon, and California trails1	
Legend Rock State Archaeological Site	Hot Springs County	30.98	12.54		Near vertical cliff with more than 92 prehistoric petroglyph panels and 300 petroglyph figures	
Medicine Lodge State Archeological Site	Big Horn County	200	81		Sandstone cliff with hundreds of Native American petroglyphs and pictographs	
Names Hill	Lincoln County	4.25	1.72		Bluff near a crossing on the Green River where travelers on the Oregon and California trails carved their names	
Oregon Trail Ruts	Platte County	34.17	13.83		Remnants of the Oregon Trail's westward migration worn into sandstone	
Piedmont Charcoal Kilns	Uinta County	.886	0.359		Remnants of the charcoal-making industry in southwestern Wyoming	
Platte River Crossing	Carbon County	7	2.8		Point at which the Overland Trail crossed the North Platte River	
Point of Rocks Stage Station	Sweetwater County	1	0.40		Meeting point of the Overland Trail and the Union Pacific Railroad	
Quebec-One Missile Alert Facility	Laramie County	1	0.40		1962 control center, opened to the public in August 2019 after United States Air Force restoration	
Register Cliff	Platte County	.16	0.065		Navigational landmark on the Oregon Trail	
South Pass City	Fremont County	345.88	139.97		Surviving "ghost town" on the Oregon Trail	
Trail End	Sheridan	3.76	1.52		Mansion of cattleman and politician John B. Kendrick	
Woodruff Cabin Site	Hot Springs County	1	0.40		Location of the first European-American settlement in the Big Horn Basin	
LX Bar Ranch State Historic Site	Campbell County	50	20		John B. Kendrick ranch (No public access)	
Wyoming Territorial Prison	Laramie	197.4	79.9		Federal penitentiary from 1872 to 1890; state prison from 1890 to 1901	

== See also ==
- List of Wyoming state parks
- List of National Historic Landmarks in Wyoming
- Wyoming Pioneer Memorial Museum
- List of the oldest buildings in Wyoming
- Albany County, Wyoming monuments and markers
- Carbon County, Wyoming monuments and markers
- Wyoming historical monuments and markers
