= Bear River State Park =

State Park in Uinta County, Wyoming

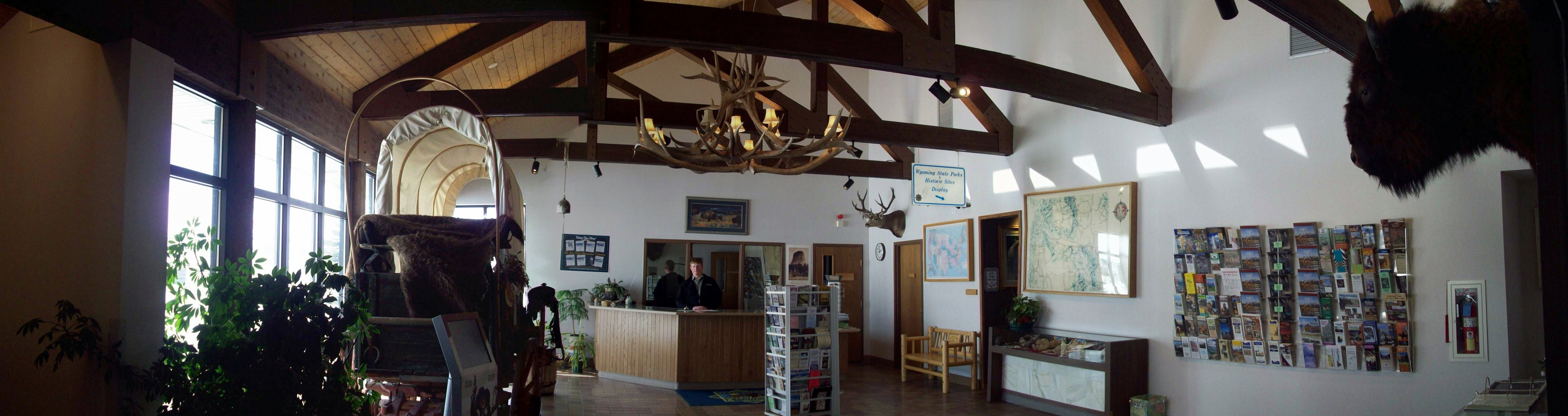
- Visitors Center

- Location within Wyoming
- Location: Evanston, Wyoming, United States
- Coordinates: 41°15′53″N 110°56′18″W
- Area: 324 acres (131 ha)
- Elevation: 6,799 ft (2,072 m)
- Established: 1991
- Administrator: Wyoming State Parks, Historic Sites & Trails
- Visitors: 270,640 (in 2022)
- Designation: Wyoming state park
- Website: Official website

Bear River State Park is a public recreation area straddling the Bear River on the east side of the city of Evanston, Wyoming. The 324-acre (131 ha) state park was established in 1991 and is managed by Wyoming Division of State Parks and Historic Sites.

== Activities and amenities ==
The park offers picnicking and a visitors center. Wildlife viewing includes a small herd of captive bison and elk. The park is at the eastern terminus of the Bear River Greenway, a trail system developed by the city that connects the park with downtown Evanston. Other hiking opportunities include 1.2 miles (1.9 km) of paved trail, an arched footbridge that crosses the river, and 1.7 miles (2.7 km) of packed gravel trails. Trails are used for cross-country skiing in winter. Park events include the annual Bear River Rendezvous held the weekend before Labor Day.
