= Hynds =

Hynds is a surname. Notable people with the surname include:

- Ross Hynds (1947–2015), New Zealand Paralympic athlete
- Tommy Hynds (1880–1944), Scottish footballer

== See also ==
- Hynds Lodge in Cheyenne, Wyoming, named for businessman Harry P. Hynds
- Hynd
