= Edness K. Wilkins State Park =

State Park in Natrona County, Wyoming

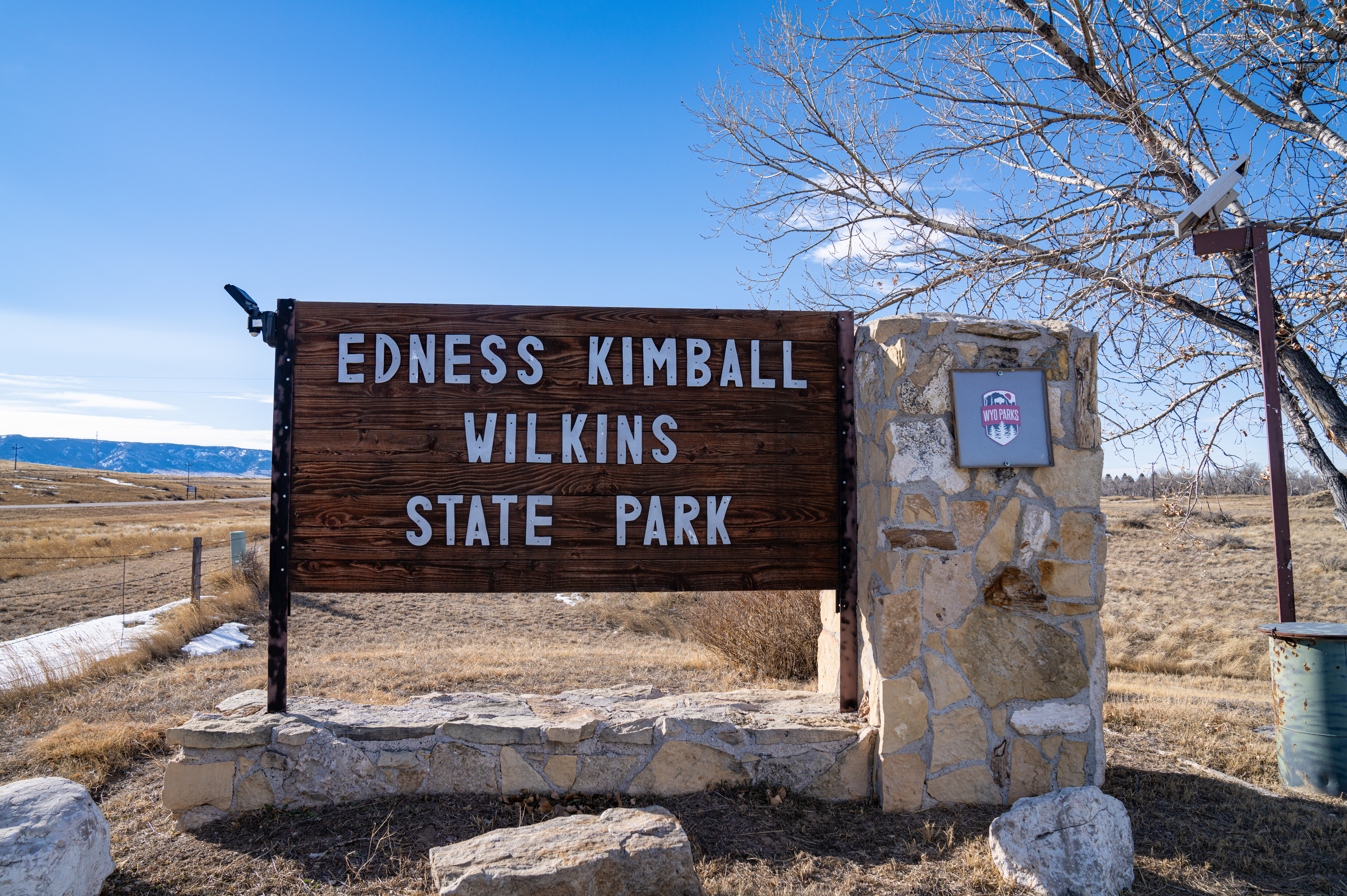

- Location within Wyoming
- Location: Natrona County, Wyoming, United States
- Nearest city: Casper
- Coordinates: 42°50′50″N 106°10′55″W
- Area: 361 acres (146 ha)
- Elevation: 5,150 ft (1,570 m)
- Established: 1981
- Administrator: Wyoming State Parks, Historic Sites & Trails
- Designation: Wyoming state park
- Named for: Edness Kimball Wilkins
- Website: Official website

Edness K. Wilkins State Park is a public recreation area on the North Platte River located six miles (9.7 km) east of the city of Casper in Natrona County, Wyoming. The state park occupies the site of a former rock quarry that was purchased by the state in 1981 for $380,000. It was named after area resident Edness Kimball Wilkins (1896-1980), who served for 25 years in the Wyoming state legislature. The park encompasses 361 acres (146 ha) and offers picnicking, boating, fishing, swimming, and bird watching. The Audubon Society designated the park an Important Bird Area because of its extensive use during the spring and fall migrations, plus its large numbers of common nesting birds. It is managed by the Wyoming Division of State Parks and Historic Sites.
