= Curt Gowdy State Park =

State park in Wyoming, United States

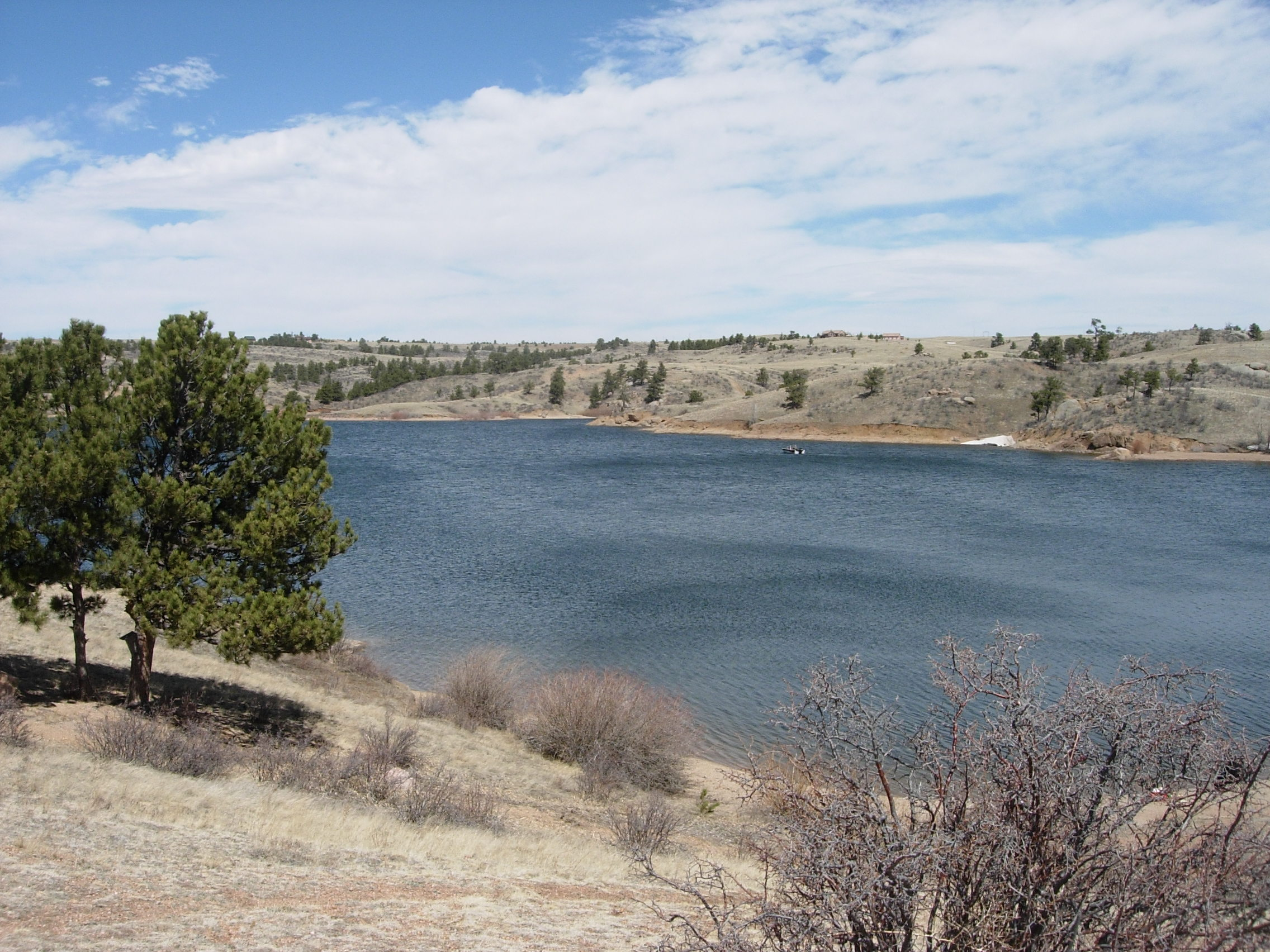
- Granite Springs Reservoir

- Location within Wyoming
- Location: Laramie County and Albany County, Wyoming, United States
- Nearest city: Cheyenne and Laramie
- Coordinates: 41°10′36″N 105°14′00″W
- Area: 3,395 acres (1,374 ha)
- Elevation: 7,214 ft (2,199 m)
- Established: 1971 (as Granite State Park)
- Administrator: Wyoming State Parks, Historic Sites & Trails
- Visitors: 543,571 (in 2022)
- Designation: Wyoming state park
- Named for: Curt Gowdy, sportscaster (1972)
- Website: Official website

Curt Gowdy State Park is a public recreation area covering 3,395 acres (5.3 sq mi; 13.7 km^{2}) in Albany and Laramie counties in Wyoming, United States. It is located on Wyoming Highway 210 (Happy Jack Road), halfway between Cheyenne and Laramie, about 24 miles (40 km) from each. The state park is known for its extensive trail system, fishing reservoirs, and Hynds Lodge, which is listed on the National Register of Historic Places. The park is managed by the Wyoming Division of State Parks and Historic Sites.

== History ==
The park was established in 1971 through a lease agreement with the City of Cheyenne and the Boy Scouts. It was originally called Granite State Park and covered 2,473 acres (3.9 sq mi; 10.0 km^{2}). It was renamed in 1972 in honor of national sportscaster and outdoorsman Curt Gowdy (1919–2006), a Wyoming native, born in Green River and raised in Cheyenne where his broadcasting career began.

The park originally included the Crystal and Granite Springs reservoirs. It was expanded in 2005 to include the Upper North Crow Reservoir, the area of Hidden Falls, and the canyon below the dam at Crystal Reservoir.

In 2006, the park saw initiation of an International Mountain Bicycling Association (IMBA) trail improvement project. The trail system earned the IMBA's "Epic" designation in 2009. In 2009, Wyoming began a program to build additional hiking trails in several Wyoming state parks. Curt Gowdy State Park served as the pilot project for the program, with 32 miles of additional trails. The state required that the newly built trails do not fundamentally alter the landscape of the park. Funding for the trails came from federal and state funds and private donations.

Trail improvements resulted in a substantial increase in visitorship with number of annual visitors to the park increasing from 56,000 in 2006 to 120,000 in 2013. To accommodate the park's newfound popularity, a new state-of-the-art, green-certified, visitor center was opened in 2014.

== Geography ==
Hidden Falls on Middle Crow Creek

Park terrain consists of rolling hills and sharp granite outcroppings in the foothills of the Laramie Mountains. Elevation ranges from 6,450 feet (1,970 m) to over 7,500 feet (2,290 m). Wildlife that can be found include: kokanee salmon, perch, brown, rainbow and lake trout, white-tailed deer, and mule deer. The park is divided into seven sections centering around three reservoirs: Granite Springs, the largest, Crystal, the smallest, and the isolated North Crow, located northwest of the main park.

== Activities and amenities ==
The park offers over 35 miles (55 km) of trails for biking, hiking, and horseback riding. Other activities include boating, canoeing, water skiing, fishing, camping, rockhounding, and archery.
