= Frank Chapman =

Frank Chapman may refer to:

- Frank Chapman (attorney), (born 1950), American attorney who served in the Wyoming House of Representatives
- Frank Chapman (baseball) (1861–1937), American baseball player once known as Fred Chapman
- Sir Frank Chapman (businessman) (born 1953), British CEO of BG Group
- Frank Chapman (ornithologist) (1864–1945), American ornithologist
- Frank Chapman (priest) (1831–1924), Anglican priest
- Frank H. Chapman (1851–1923), American public official from Vermont
