= Seminoe State Park =

State Park in Carbon County, Wyoming

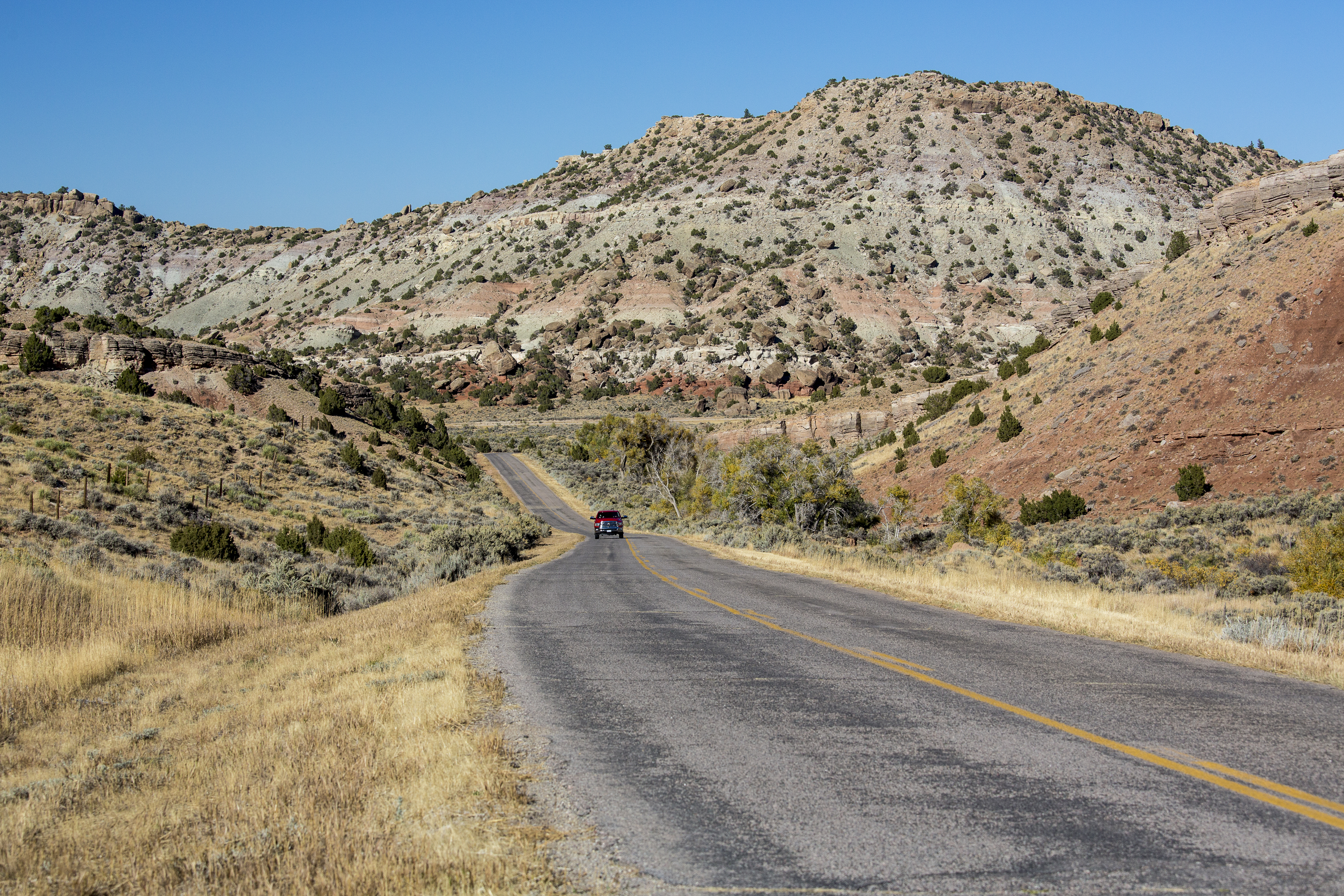
- Seminoe-Alcova Backcountry Byway in Seminoe State Park

- Location within Wyoming
- Location: Carbon County, Wyoming, United States
- Coordinates: 42°06′32″N 106°52′13″W
- Area: 20,848 acres (8,437 ha)
- Elevation: 6,390 ft (1,950 m)
- Established: 1965
- Administrator: Wyoming State Parks, Historic Sites & Trails
- Designation: Wyoming state park
- Website: Official website

Seminoe State Park is a public recreation area located on the northwest side of the Seminoe Reservoir, at the base of the Seminoe Mountains, 35 miles (56 km) north of Sinclair, Carbon County, Wyoming. The state park encompasses 1,639 acres (663 ha) of land and offers access to 19,000 acres (7,700 ha) of water. It is managed by the Wyoming Division of State Parks and Historic Sites.

== History ==
Following construction of the Seminoe Dam and Reservoir in the 1930s, the state of Wyoming created the state park in 1965 through an agreement with the U.S. Bureau of Reclamation. The name Seminoe -- a corruption of the French name Cimineau -- derives from the French trapper, Basil Cimineau Lajeunesse, who was active in the area in the 1800s.

== Activities and amenities ==
The park's recreational offerings include two camping areas, swimming, fishing, boating, and picnicking. Local wildlife includes bobcats, mule deer, skunks, raccoons, moose, elk, mountain lions, bighorn sheep, rabbits, and bald eagles.
