= Hawk Springs State Recreation Area =

State Park in Goshen County, Wyoming

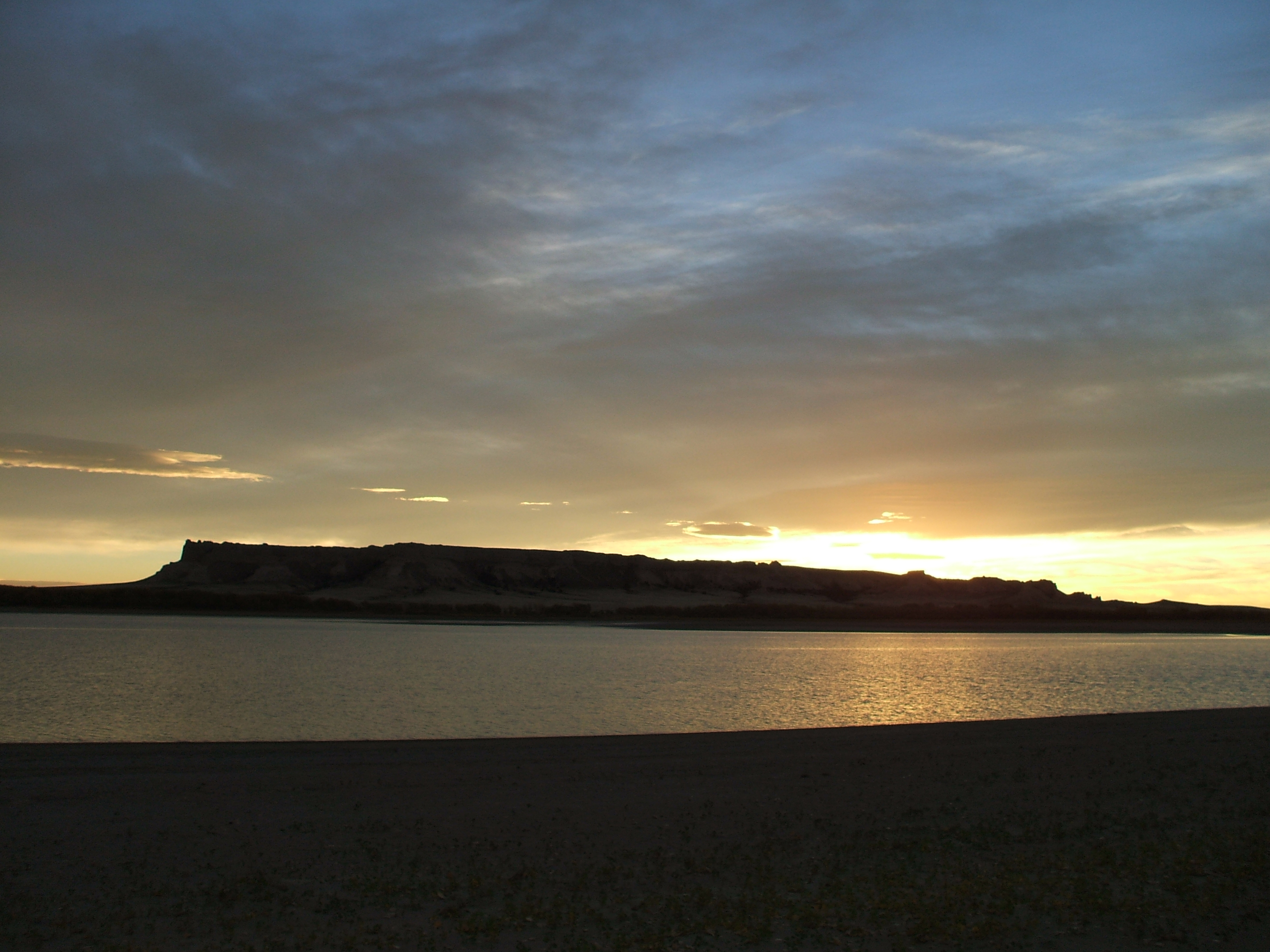

- Location within Wyoming
- Location: Goshen County, Wyoming, United States
- Nearest city: La Grange
- Coordinates: 41°42′57″N 104°11′43″W
- Area: 996 acres (403 ha)
- Elevation: 4,478 ft (1,365 m)
- Established: 1987
- Administrator: Wyoming State Parks, Historic Sites & Trails
- Designation: Wyoming state park
- Website: Official website

Hawk Springs State Recreation Area is a public recreation area on Hawk Springs Reservoir, located ten miles (16 km) southeast of Hawk Springs and ten miles (16 km) north of La Grange in Goshen County, Wyoming. The state park occupies fifty-nine acres (24 ha) of land on the reservoir's western shore and is managed by the Wyoming State Parks, Historic Sites & Trails Division.

== Activities and amenities ==
The park has a boat ramp, picnicking area, and campsites. The reservoir is home to a great blue heron rookery, accessible by boat. Other area waterfowl include blue-winged and green-winged teals, gadwalls, wood ducks, and pintails. Largemouth bass, walleye, and channel catfish are found in the reservoir.
