= Hot Springs State Park =

State Park and hot springs in Hot Springs County, Wyoming

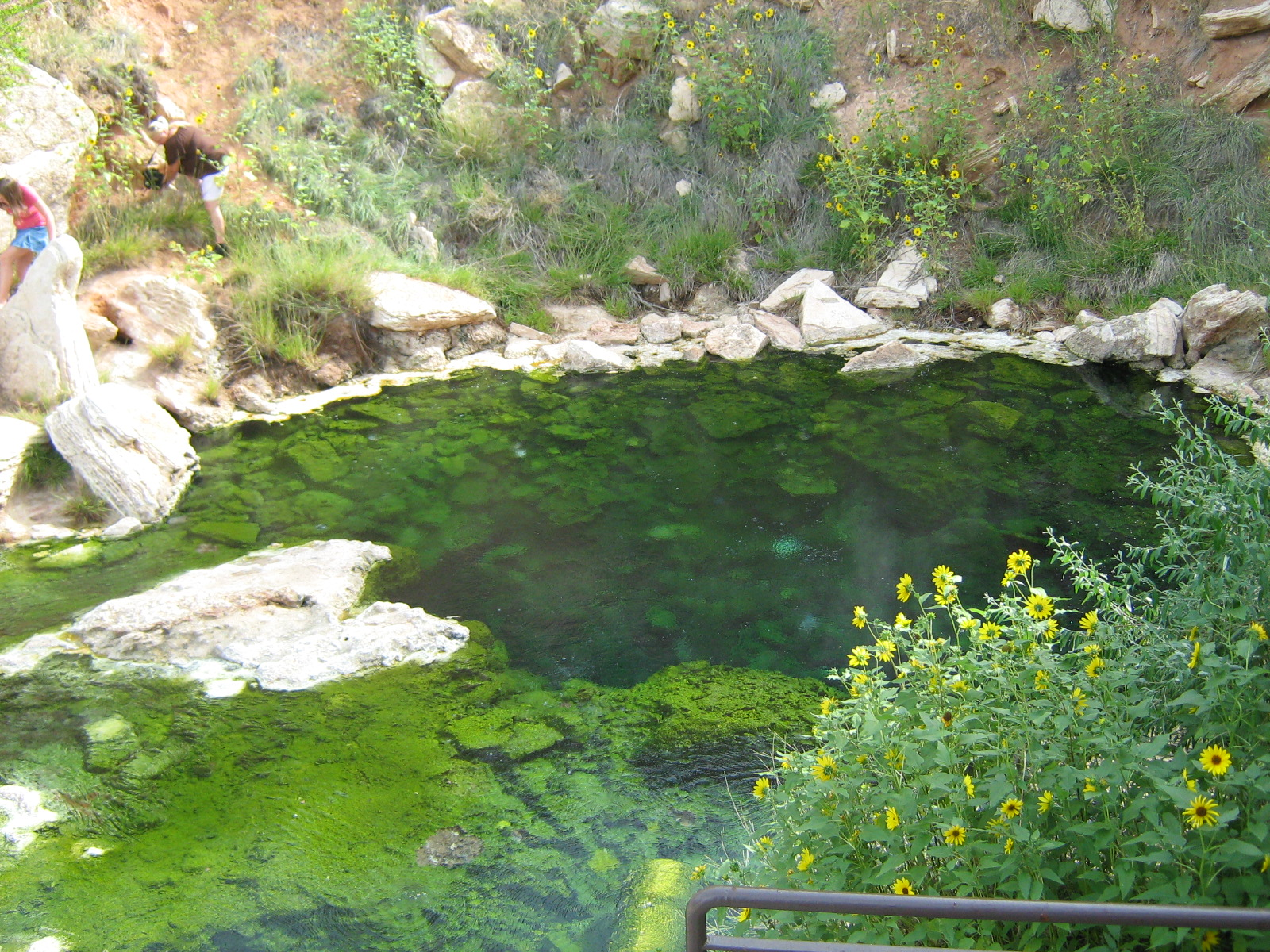

- Location within Wyoming
- Location: Thermopolis, Wyoming, United States
- Coordinates: 43°39′12″N 108°11′42″W
- Area: 1,108.67 acres (448.66 ha)
- Elevation: 4,354 ft (1,327 m)
- Established: 1897
- Administrator: Wyoming State Parks, Historic Sites & Trails
- Designation: Wyoming state park
- Website: Official website

Hot Springs State Park is a public recreation area in Thermopolis, Wyoming, known for its hot springs, which flow at a constant temperature of 135 °F (57.2 °C). The state park offers free bathing at the State Bath House, where temperatures are moderated to a therapeutic 104 °F (40.0 °C). The petroglyph site at Legend Rock, some 25 miles (40 km) away, is also part of the park. The park is managed by the Wyoming Division of State Parks and Historic Sites.

== History ==
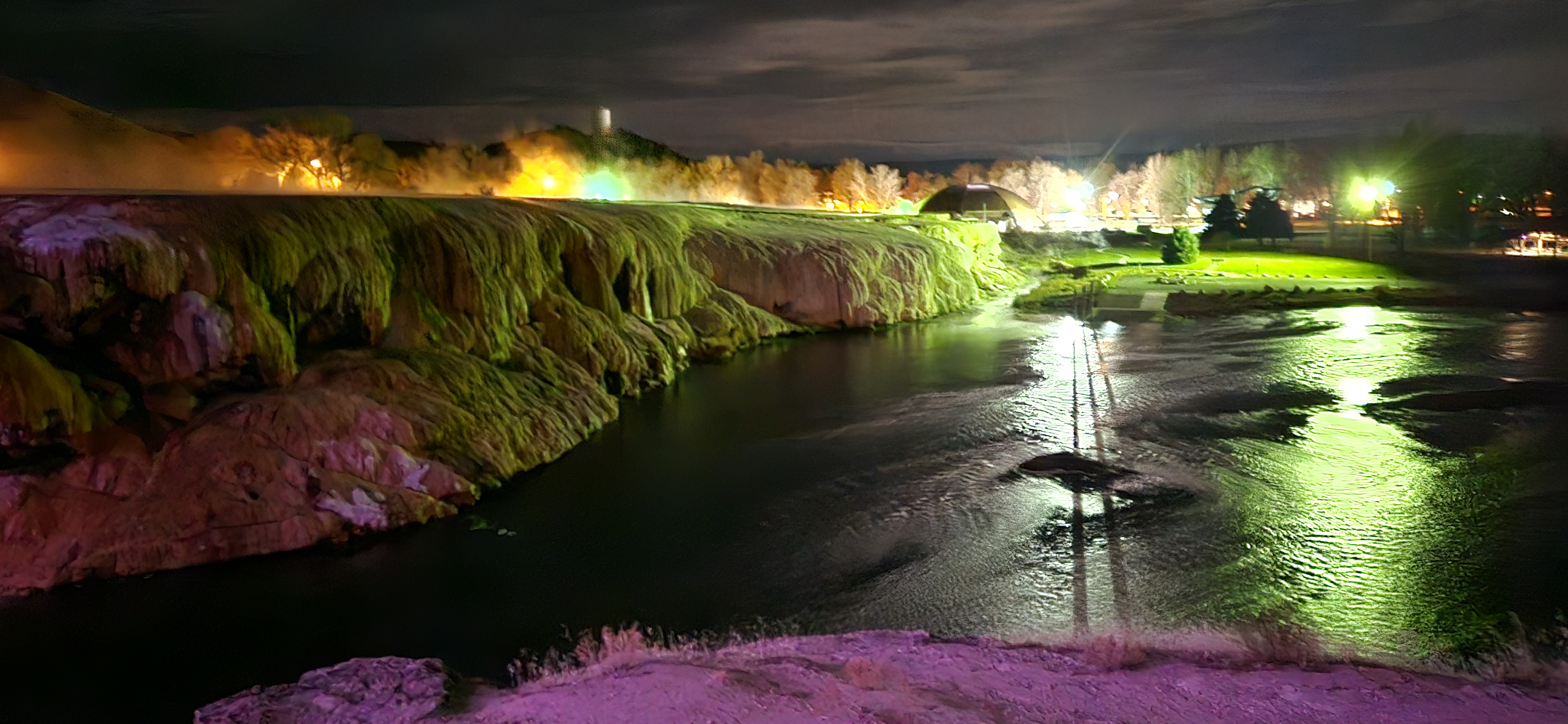
Travertine formations and limestone that empty into the Bighorn River near Hellie's TePee Pools and Spa.

The land on which the state park sits was a cession agreement, and the ceded portion was purchased from the Eastern Shoshone by the federal government in 1896, when Indian Inspector James McLaughlin negotiated a purchase price of $60,000 for a 100-square-mile portion (260 km^{2}) of the Shoshone reservation. A 1-square-mile section (2.6 km^{2}) of that land was released to the state in 1897 which became Wyoming's first state park, known as Big Horn Hot Springs State Reserve.

A small herd of bison was established in 1916.

== Features ==
Designated as the State Bison Herd, the number of bison is maintained at 15 due to the carrying capacity of the pasture. The park features a suspension foot bridge across the Big Horn River, picnic shelters, boat docks, flower gardens, and terraces made of naturally forming travertine (calcium carbonate) caused by a flowing mineral hot spring. The park area encompasses commercial hotels and several state-run and privately operated entities including the Gottsche Rehabilitation Center, Hot Springs County Memorial Hospital, the historic Callaghan Apartments/Plaza Hotel, the Star Plunge waterpark, the Tepee Pools waterpark, and the Wyoming Pioneer Home, a state-run, assisted-living facility.

== Gallery ==
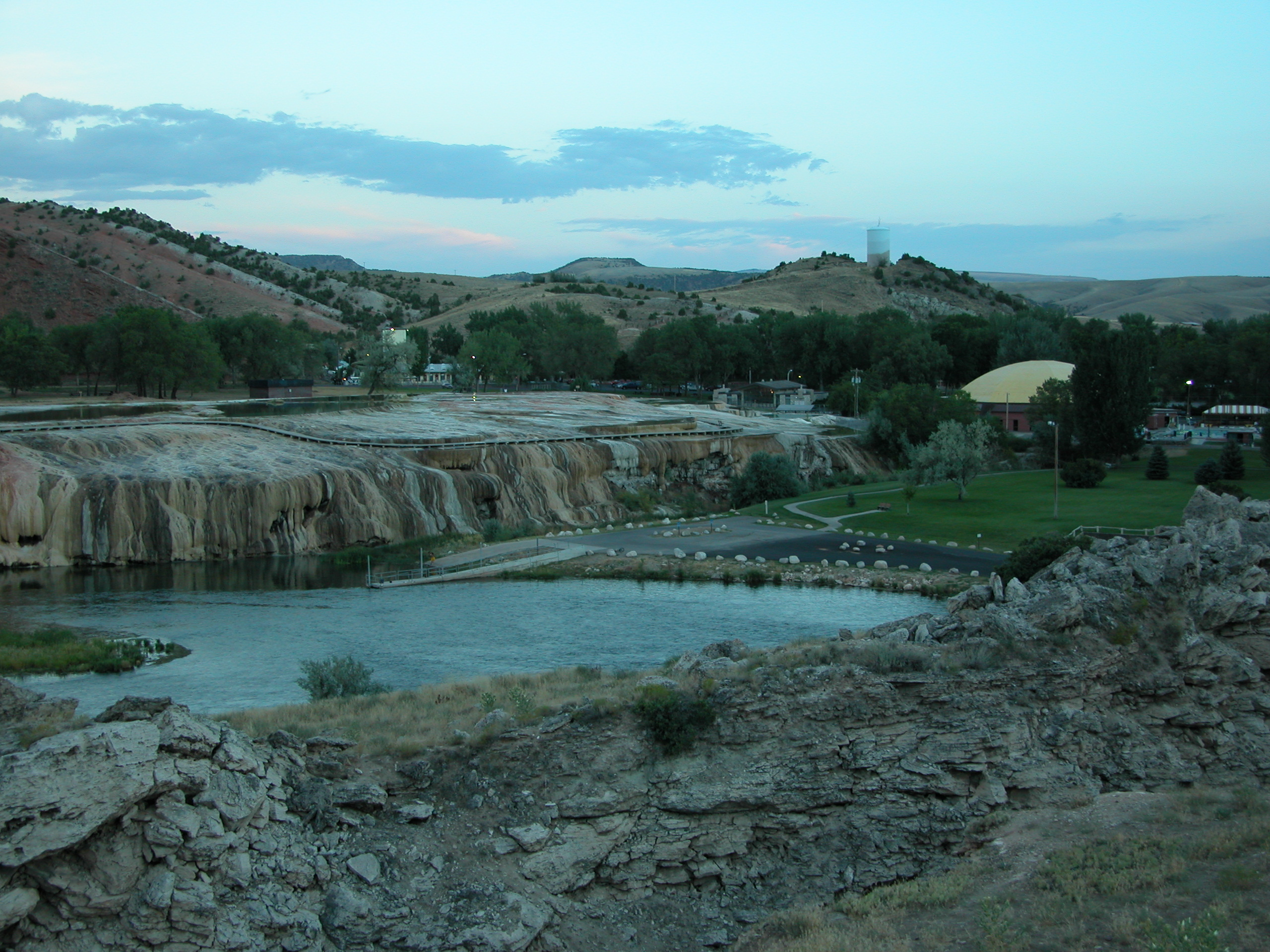
Travertine formation
at Hot Springs State Park

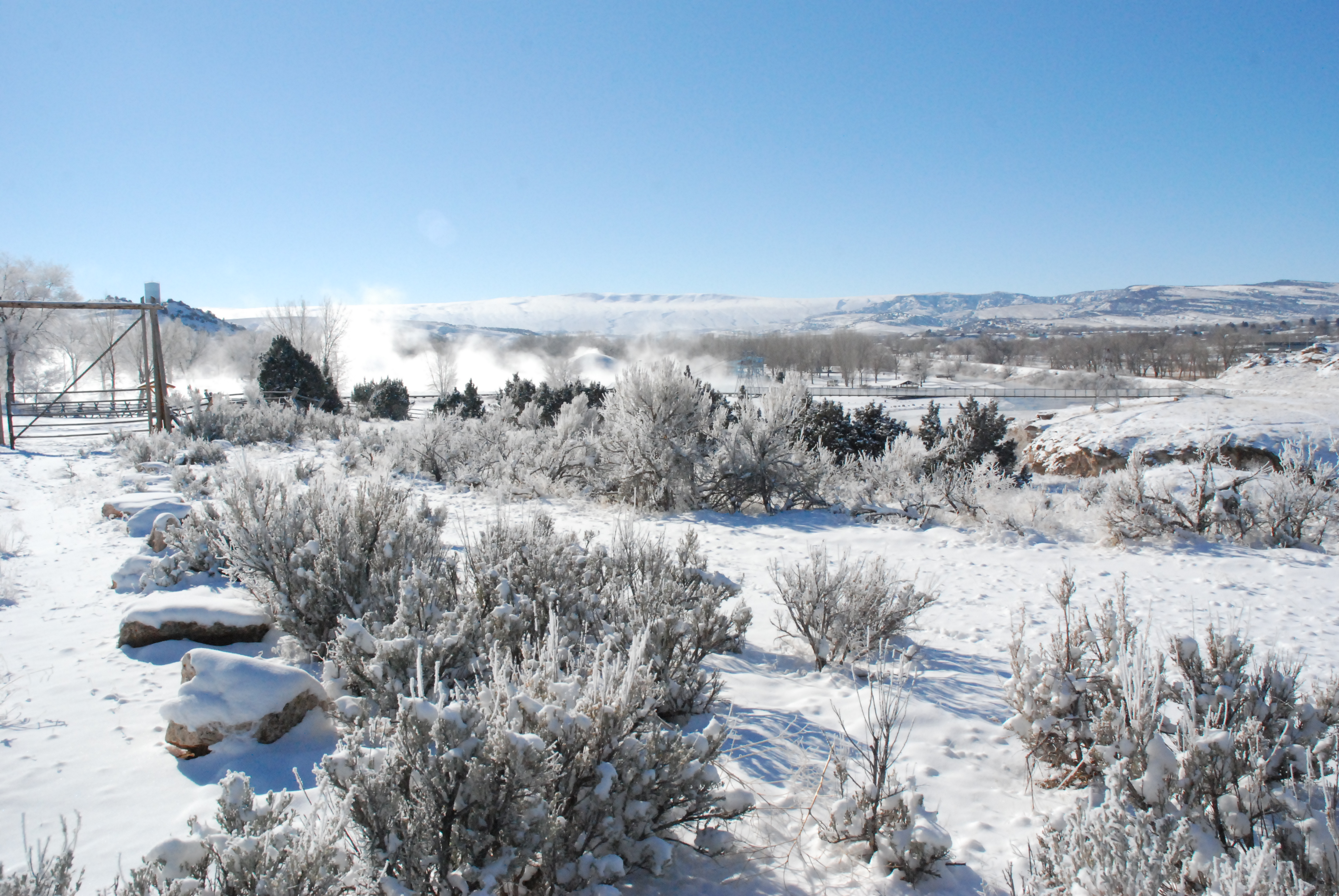
Winter view of the suspension footbridge
over the Big Horn River

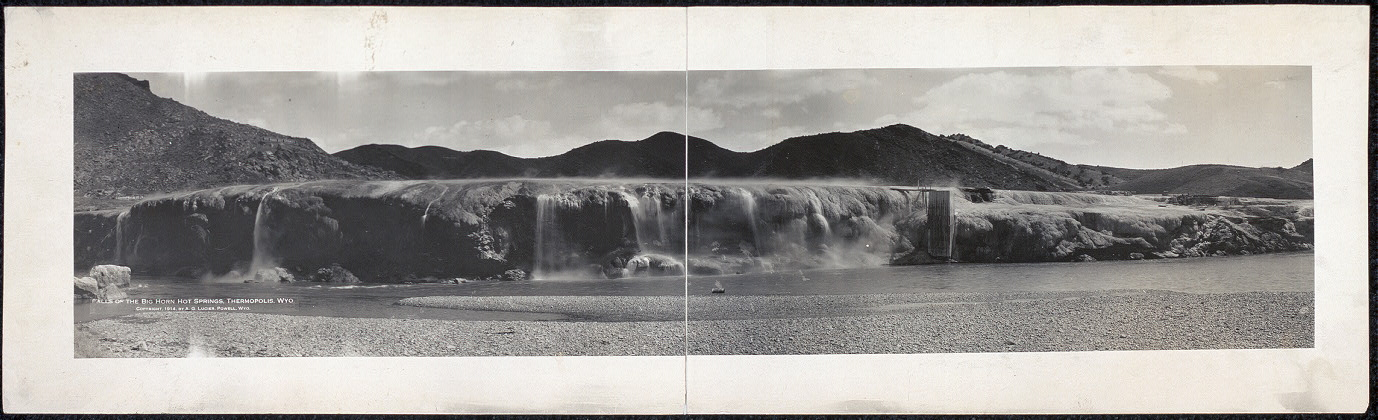
Big Horn Hot Springs, c. 1914

Two tourists at Big Horn Hot Springs, Thermopolis Wyoming, early 20th century
