= Glendo State Park =

State Park in Converse and Platte counties, Wyoming

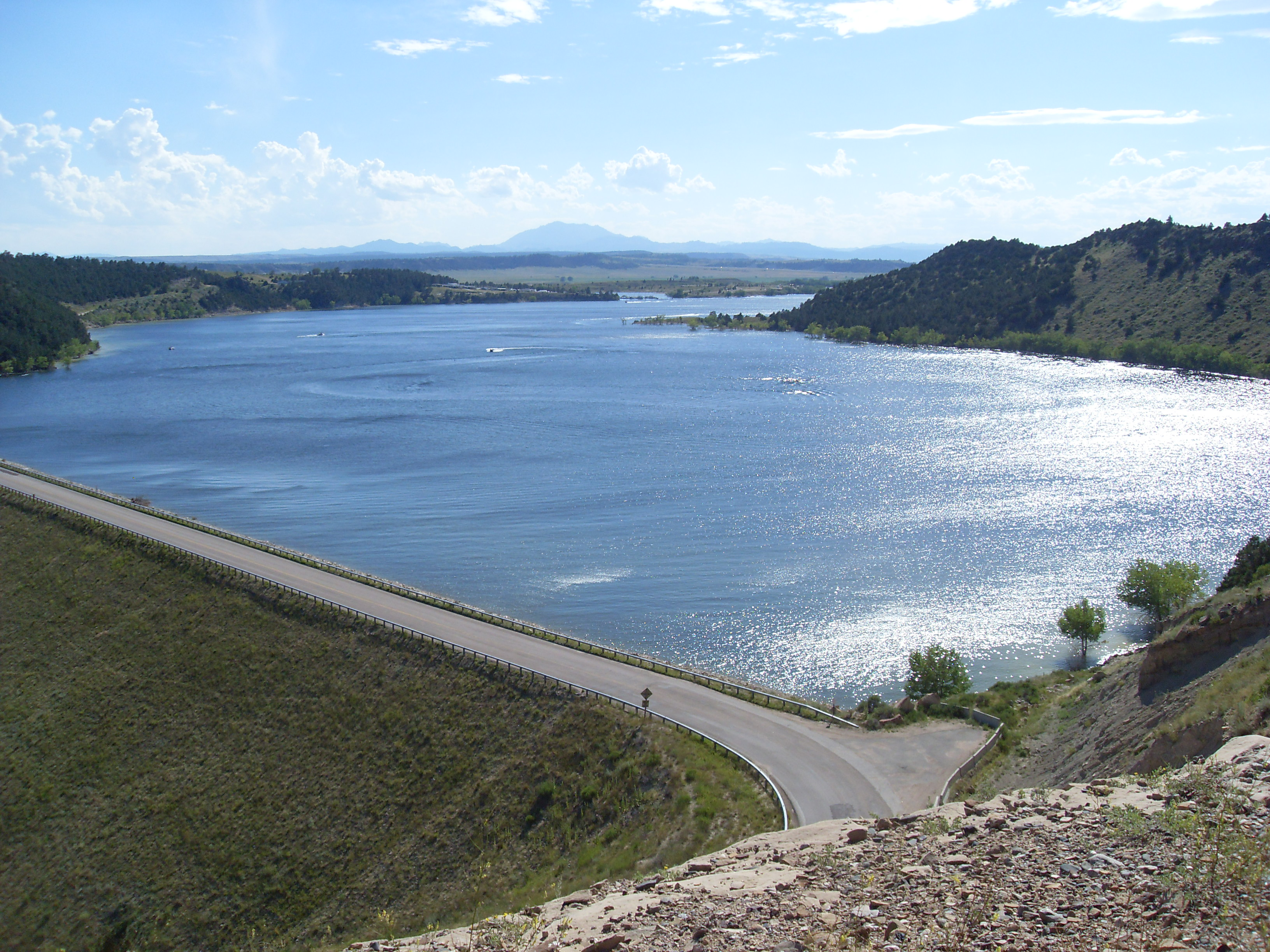

- Location within Wyoming
- Location: Platte & Converse counties, Wyoming, United States
- Coordinates: 42°32′32″N 104°59′31″W
- Area: 18,382 acres (7,439 ha)
- Elevation: 4,639 ft (1,414 m)
- Established: 1959
- Administrator: Wyoming State Parks, Historic Sites & Trails
- Designation: Wyoming state park
- Website: Official website

Glendo State Park is a public recreation area surrounding Glendo Reservoir on the North Platte River in Platte and Converse counties in Wyoming in the United States. The state park is located near the town of Glendo, about 20 miles (32 km) southeast of the city of Douglas. It is managed by the Wyoming Division of State Parks and Historic Sites.

== History ==
The Glendo dam, power plant and reservoir were constructed between 1954 and 1958. In June 1959, the Wyoming Parks Commission formed a contract with the U.S. Bureau of Reclamation for the administration and development of facilities for recreational purposes at Glendo Reservoir.

== Activities and amenities ==
The park offers 45 miles (72 km) of mountain bike trails, multiple camping areas totaling more than 500 campsites, plus fishing and other water activities with the reservoir producing several state record-size fish.

== In the news ==
A total solar eclipse passed directly over the park on Monday, August 21, 2017. The midpoint of totality occurred at 17:46 UTC (local time: 11:46 a.m. MDT), with totality lasting for 2 minutes 28 seconds.
