= Register Cliff =

- U.S. National Register of Historic Places
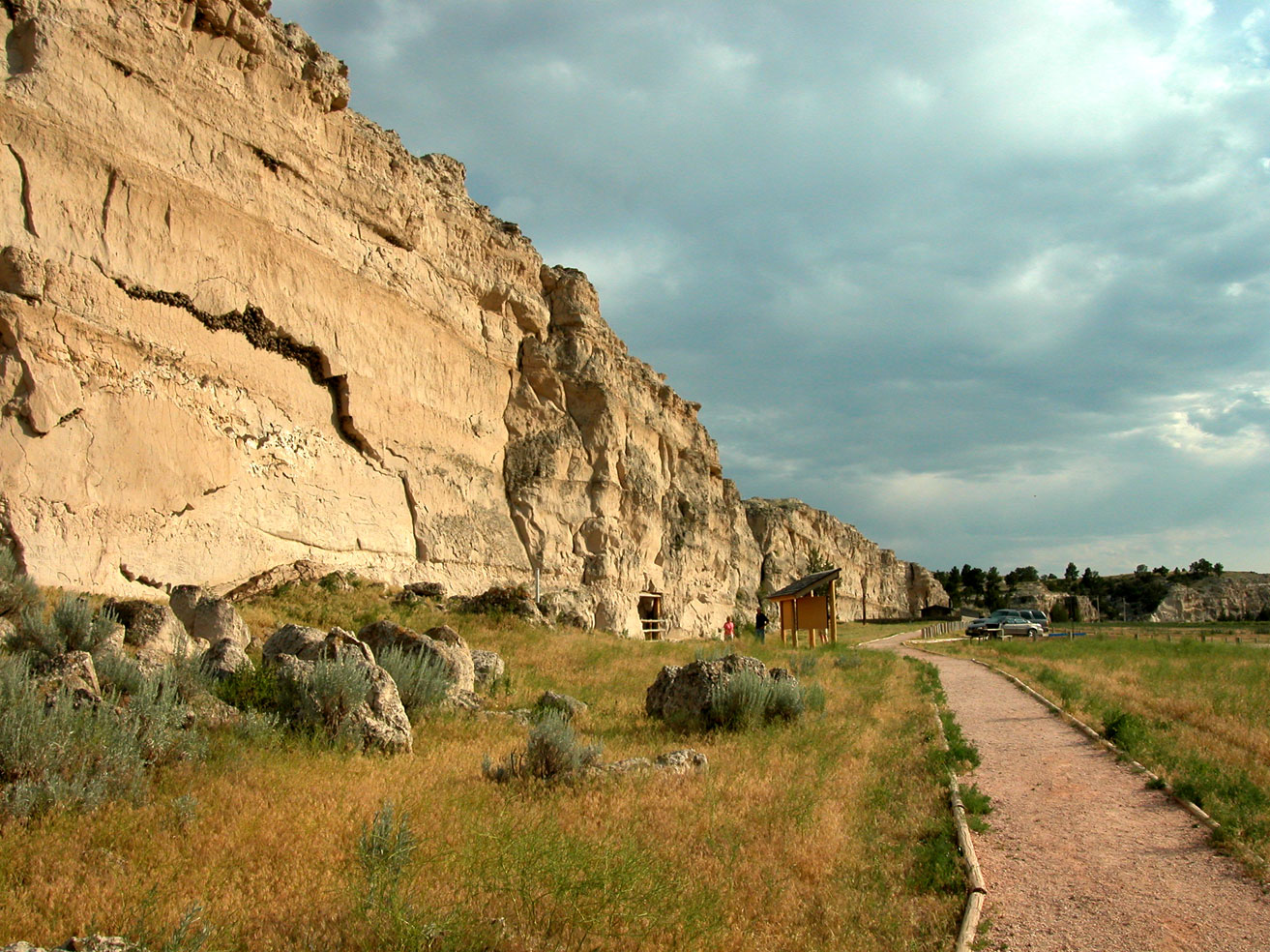
- Register Cliff

- Location within Wyoming Location within the United States
- Nearest city: Guernsey, Wyoming
- Coordinates: 42°14′56″N 104°42′32″W
- NRHP reference No.: 70000674
- Added to NRHP: April 30, 1970

Register Cliff is a sandstone cliff and featured key navigational landmark prominently listed in the 19th century guidebooks about the Oregon Trail, and a place where many emigrants chiseled the names of their families on the soft stones of the cliff — it was one of the key checkpoint landmarks for parties heading west along the Platte River valley west of Fort John, Wyoming which allowed travelers to verify they were on the correct path up to South Pass and not moving into impassable mountain terrains—geographically, it is on the eastern ascent of the Continental Divide leading upward out of the Great Plains in the east of the U.S. state of Wyoming. It is notable as a historic landmark for 'registering' hundreds of emigrants on the Oregon Trail (thus also the other northern Emigrant Trails that split off farther west such as the California Trail and Mormon Trail) who came to follow custom and inscribed their names on its rocks during the western migrations of the 19th century. An estimated 500,000 emigrants used these trails from 1843 to 1869, with up to one-tenth dying along the way, usually due to disease.

Register Cliff is the easternmost of the three prominent emigrant "recording areas" located within Wyoming, the other two being Independence Rock and Names Hill.

The site was listed on the National Register of Historic Places in 1969.

According to its nomination, the site was where emigrants would camp on their first night west of Fort Laramie. The property was donated by Henry Frederick to the state of Wyoming, to be preserved.

== Geology ==
Register Cliff is a soft, chalky, limestone wall rising more than 100 feet (30 m) above the North Platte River. It consists of The horizontal layers of sedimentary rocks eroded by the river. Level grass plains run from the cliff to the river. Primary erosion was by water and the continuing effects of wind and rain have little changed its features.

== Gallery ==
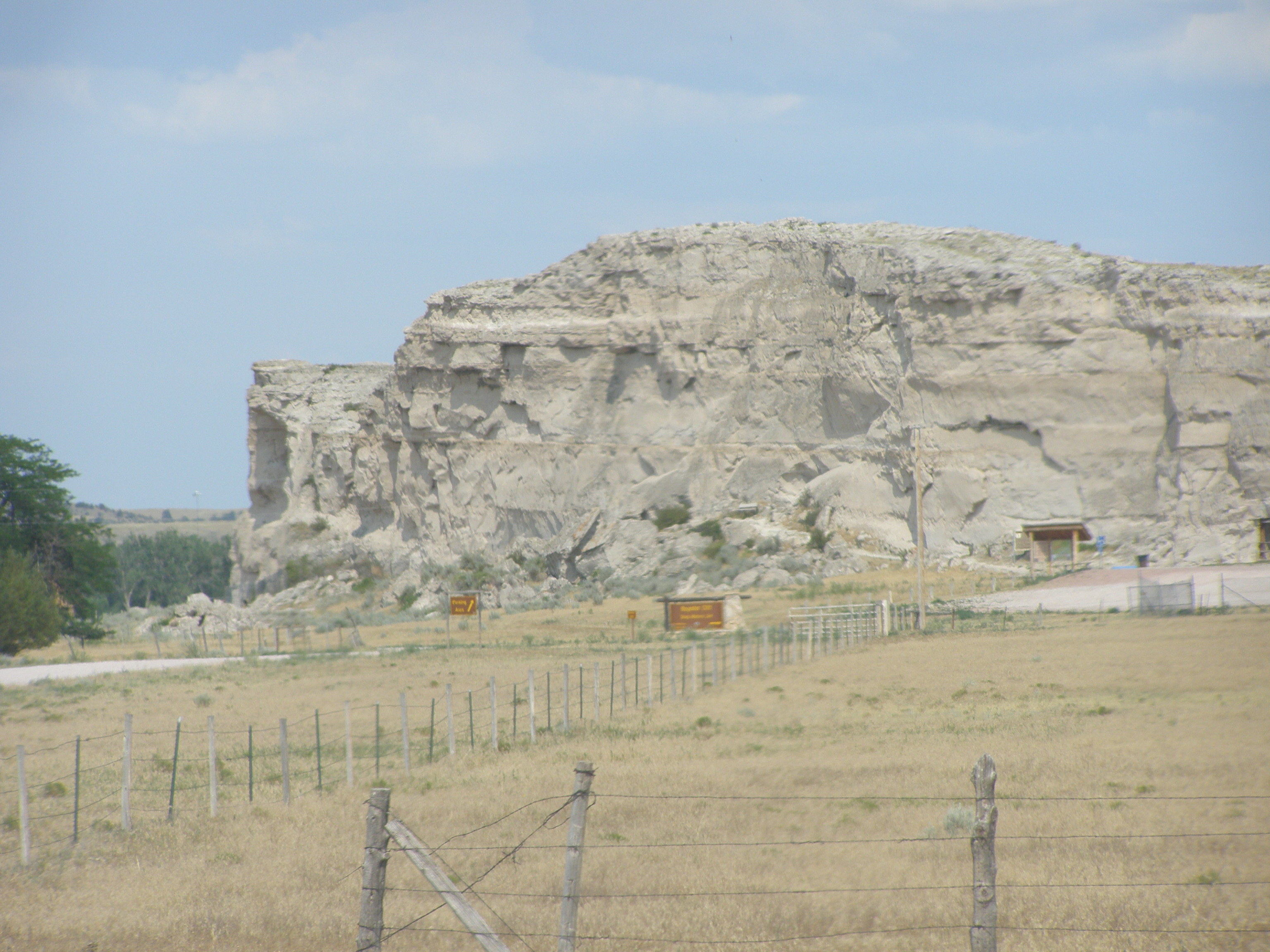
Register Cliff

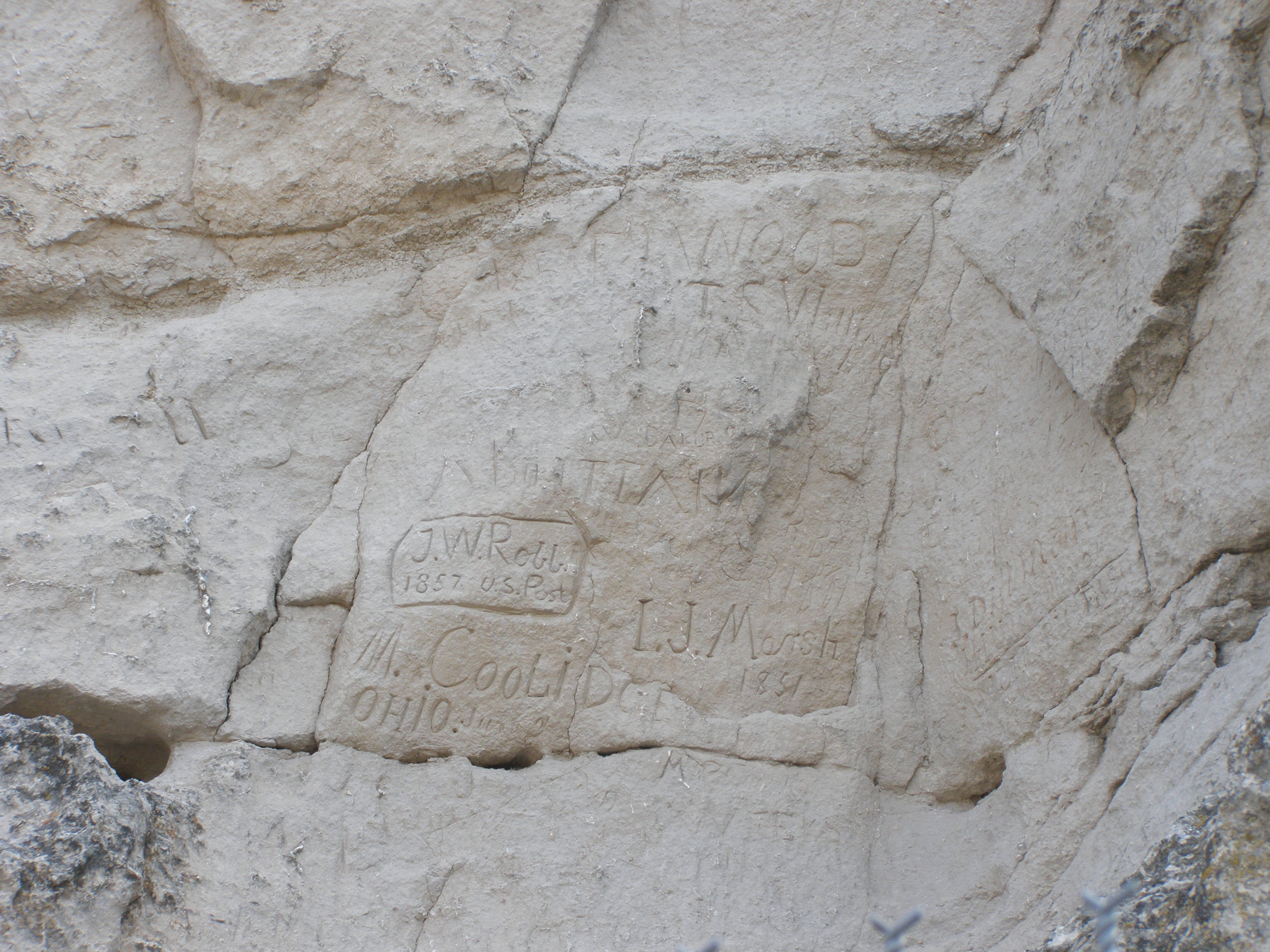
Close up of signatures

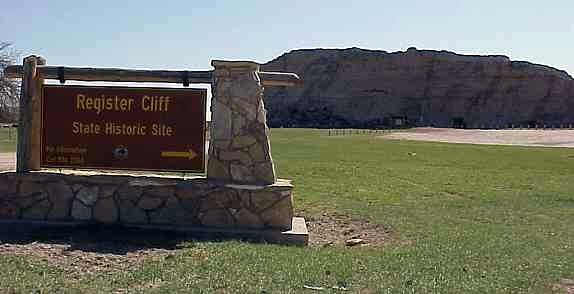
State marker and Register Cliff

== See also ==
- Guernsey State Park
- Oregon Trail
- Oregon Trail Ruts (Guernsey, Wyoming)
- Wyoming Historical Landmarks
- List of the oldest buildings in Wyoming
