= Bradley Peak (Wyoming) =

Mountain in Wyoming, United States

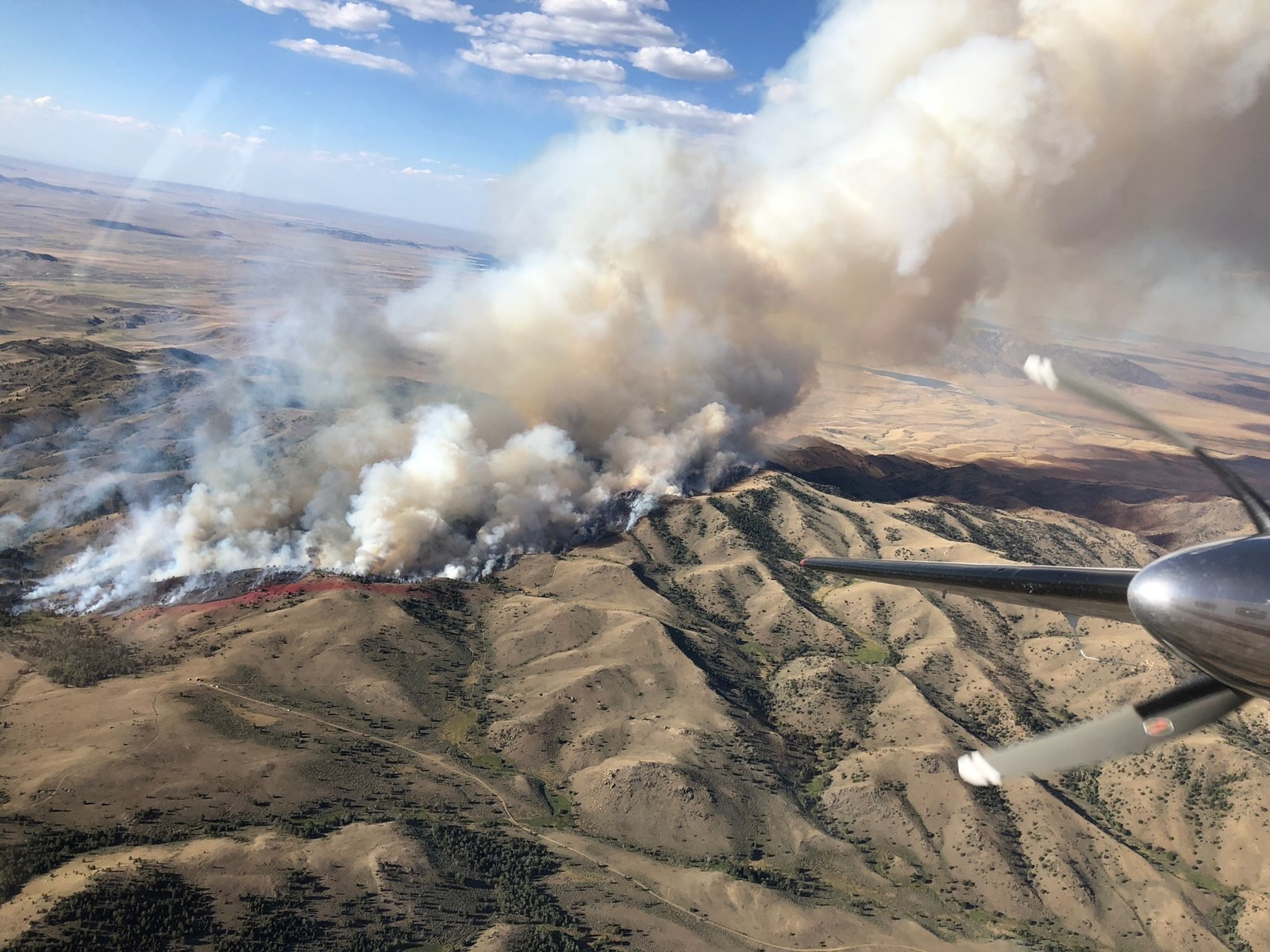
- Aerial view of the Bradley Fire near the summit in 2020

Highest point
- Elevation: 8,949 ft (2,728 m)
- Prominence: 2,062 ft (628 m)
- Coordinates: 42.1673172°N 107.0576057°W

Geography
- Location: Carbon County, Wyoming, U.S.
- Parent range: Seminoe Mountains
- Topo map: USGS Bradley Peak

Bradley Peak is a mountain summit in the Seminoe Mountains of south-central Wyoming. Located approximately 50 miles (80 km) north of Rawlins in Carbon County, the peak is the highest point in the Seminoe range. Bradley Peak reaches an elevation of 8,949 feet (2,728 m) above sea level. It stands 2,062 feet (628 m) above the surrounding terrain. The land around the peak is owned and managed by the Bureau of Land Management. The peak is part of the Seminoe Mountains greenstone belt, which contains some of the oldest rocks in the Wyoming Craton, dating back approximately 2.7 billion years.

Bradley Peak contains Komatiites: rare, high-magnesium volcanic rocks with "spinifex" textures, indicating extremely high-temperature ancient lava flows. Gold and iron ore have been found in the quartz veins present on the mountain. On August 7, 2020, the Bradley Fire ignited near the peak, eventually burning over 1,600 acres of sagebrush, grass, and juniper. The fire led to temporary evacuations of nearby campgrounds and required extensive aerial firefighting efforts. The cause was not known.
