= Durlacher House =

- U.S. National Register of Historic Places
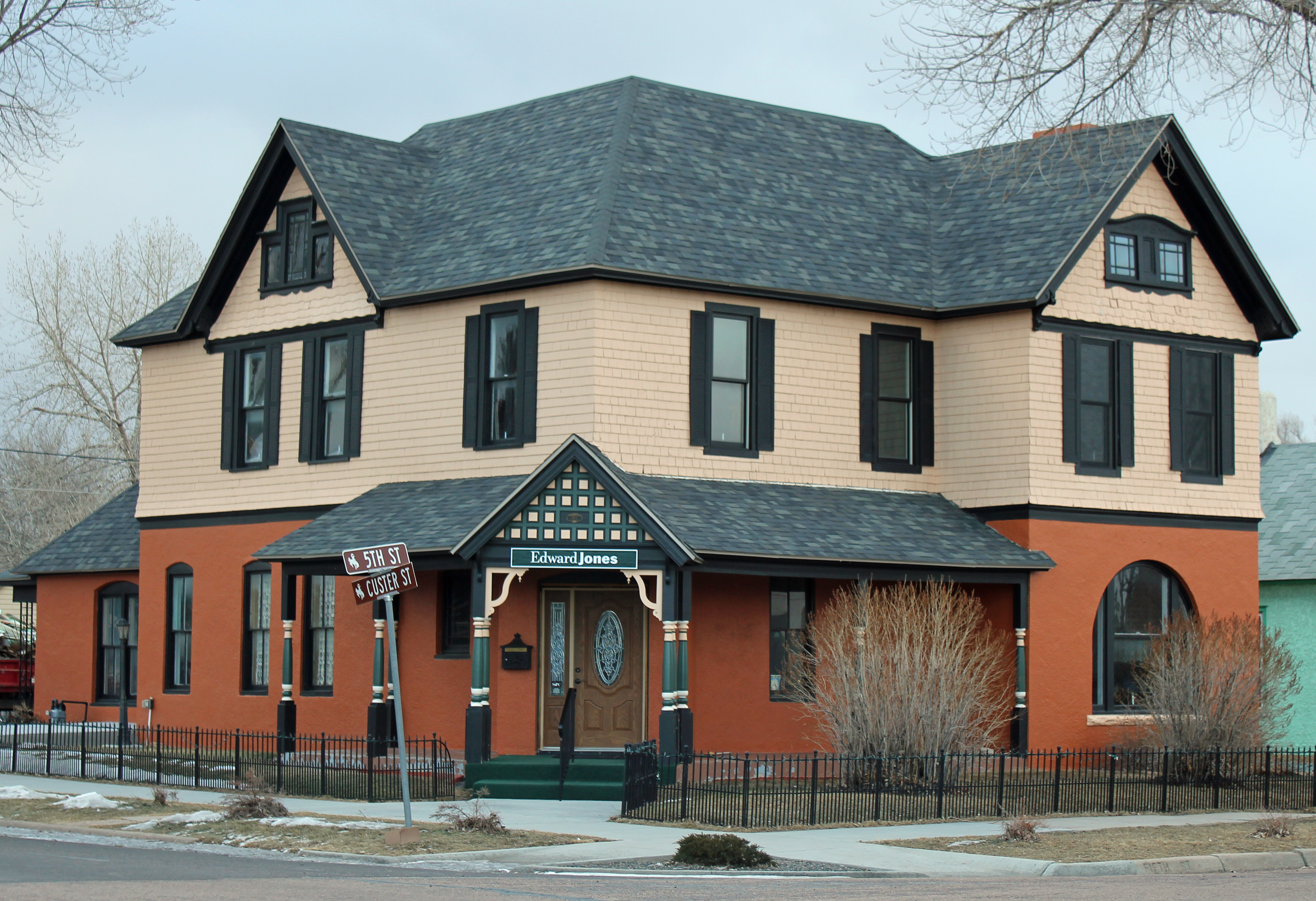
- Durlacher House in 2014

- Location within Wyoming
- Location: 501 South 5th Street, Laramie, Wyoming
- Coordinates: 41°18′32″N 105°35′28″W
- Area: less than one acre
- Built: 1875
- Architectural style: Queen Anne
- NRHP reference No.: 11000097
- Added to NRHP: March 21, 2011

The Durlacher House, or Durlacher Residence is a Queen Anne style house in Laramie, Wyoming. It was built between 1875 and 1878 by Charles Klingerman. In 1878 it was purchased by German immigrants Simon and Hannah Durlacher.

== History ==
Simon Durlacher (January 31, 1837 - 1893) was born in Schmeiheim, Baden, Germany. He emigrated with his family to Pottsville, Pennsylvania in 1852, where he studied and worked in the dry goods business. After being wounded in service in the Union army during the American Civil War he moved to Burlington, Iowa to work in a clothing store. In 1867 Durlacher moved to Cheyenne, Wyoming and worked in another dry goods store. The next year he moved farther west to Laramie, where he worked for Ben Hellman in Hellman's store, which started out in a tent and moved up to a log cabin. After working in another store Durlacher started his own in 1871 with partner William Manesse. A permanent building at 203 2nd Street followed in 1872, which also housed Laramie's Masonic Lodge, of which Durlacher was a member. In 1878 Durlacher made a buying trip to the East Coast and was introduced by friends to fellow German immigrant Hannah Gross (b. 1853) and married her in Boston on October 2, 1878. Upon their arrival in Laramie they bought the house at 501 South 5th Street from Charles and Ella Klingerman for $2000. The family enjoyed an active social life. Simon died in 1893. In 1909 Hannah married Otto Gramm and continued to live in the 5th Street house. She died in 1930.

Simon and Hannah's daughter Hilda lived at the house with husband Neale Roach from 1905 to 1941. The house was sold in 1945 to the First Christian Church, which modified the house for its use. It was sold in 1954 to the Salvation Army. The exterior of the house was stuccoed at about this time to address problems with the brick exterior, whose local bricks were known for poor durability.

== Description ==
The Durlacher House occupies a corner lot at 5th and Custer Streets. The house is 2-1/2 stories tall, with a stuccoed brick first floor and a shingled second floor. A proch extends across both sides facing the streets. The house has a variety of sash windows, including some with stained glass. A prominent arched window faces 5th Street. The house's interior has been extensively altered for its use as a church and for its present use as a business office, but many original interior features remain. Most of the interior trim has been replaced.

The Durlacher House was placed on the National Register of Historic Places in on March 21, 2011.

== See also ==
- List of the oldest buildings in Wyoming
