= Point of Rocks Stage Station State Historic Site =

- Point of Rocks Stage Station
- U.S. National Register of Historic Places
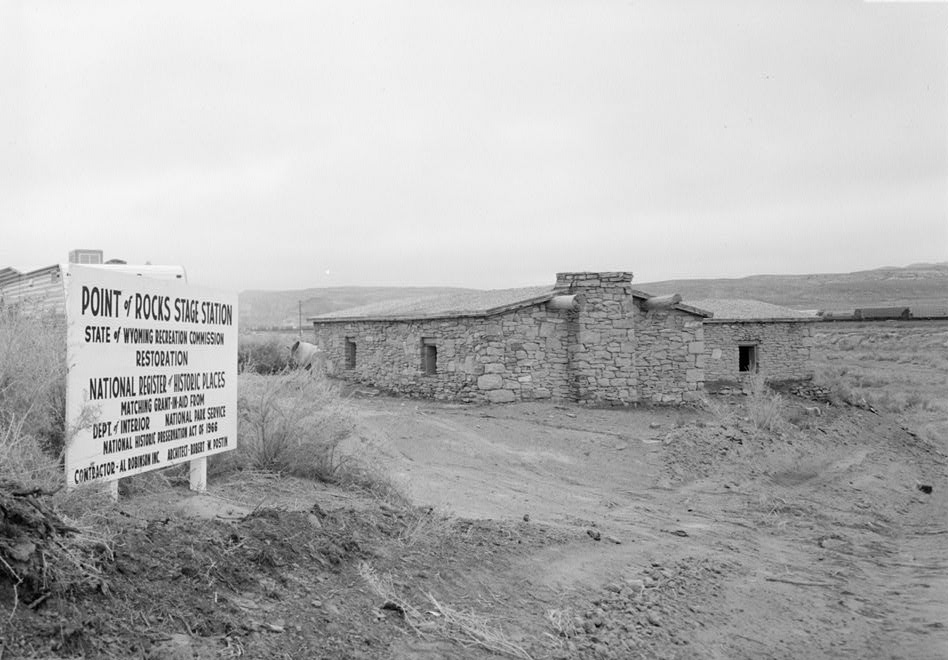

- Location within Wyoming Location within the United States
- Nearest city: Rock Springs, Wyoming
- Coordinates: 41°40′30″N 108°47′30″W
- Area: less than one acre
- Built: 1862
- NRHP reference No.: 70000679
- Added to NRHP: April 3, 1970

The Point of Rocks Stage Station is a former resting place at the meeting point of the Overland Trail and the Union Pacific Railroad in Sweetwater County, Wyoming, USA. It was built as a stop for the Overland Stage Line in 1861 or 1862, equidistant between the earlier Black Buttes and Salt Wells stations, which were 28 miles (45 km) apart. The station served the stage line from 1862 to 1868. In 1868, the Union Pacific line reached Point of Rocks, putting the stage line out of business. The station then became a freight depot for nearby mines, with a road leading to Atlantic City and South Pass. The freight activity declined, and in 1877, the station became a residence. At one point it was allegedly inhabited by Jim McKee, a former member of the Hole in the Wall Gang. It became the property of the state of Wyoming in 1947 and is administered as Point of Rocks Stage Station State Historic Site.

Point of Rocks Station is sited next to the alkaline Bitter Creek, in a valley framed by steep cliffs. The station is a low one-story building, built of local sandstone with mud mortar. The station has burned at least once, and roof construction is a timber structure with metal covering. A stable building is nearby. The station is close to the present-day Interstate 80. It was listed on the National Register of Historic Places on April 3, 1970.

== See also ==
- Wyoming Historical Landmarks
- List of the oldest buildings in Wyoming
