= LX Bar Ranch State Historic Site =

Historical place in Campbell County, Wyoming, United States

- Location within Wyoming Location within the United States
- 44.882°N 106.027°W
- Location: Campbell County, Wyoming

History
- Built: 1910
- Built for: John B. Kendrick

Site notes
- Architect: Oscar Husman
- Architectural style: Stone: light-buff sandstone
- Governing body: Wyoming Parks

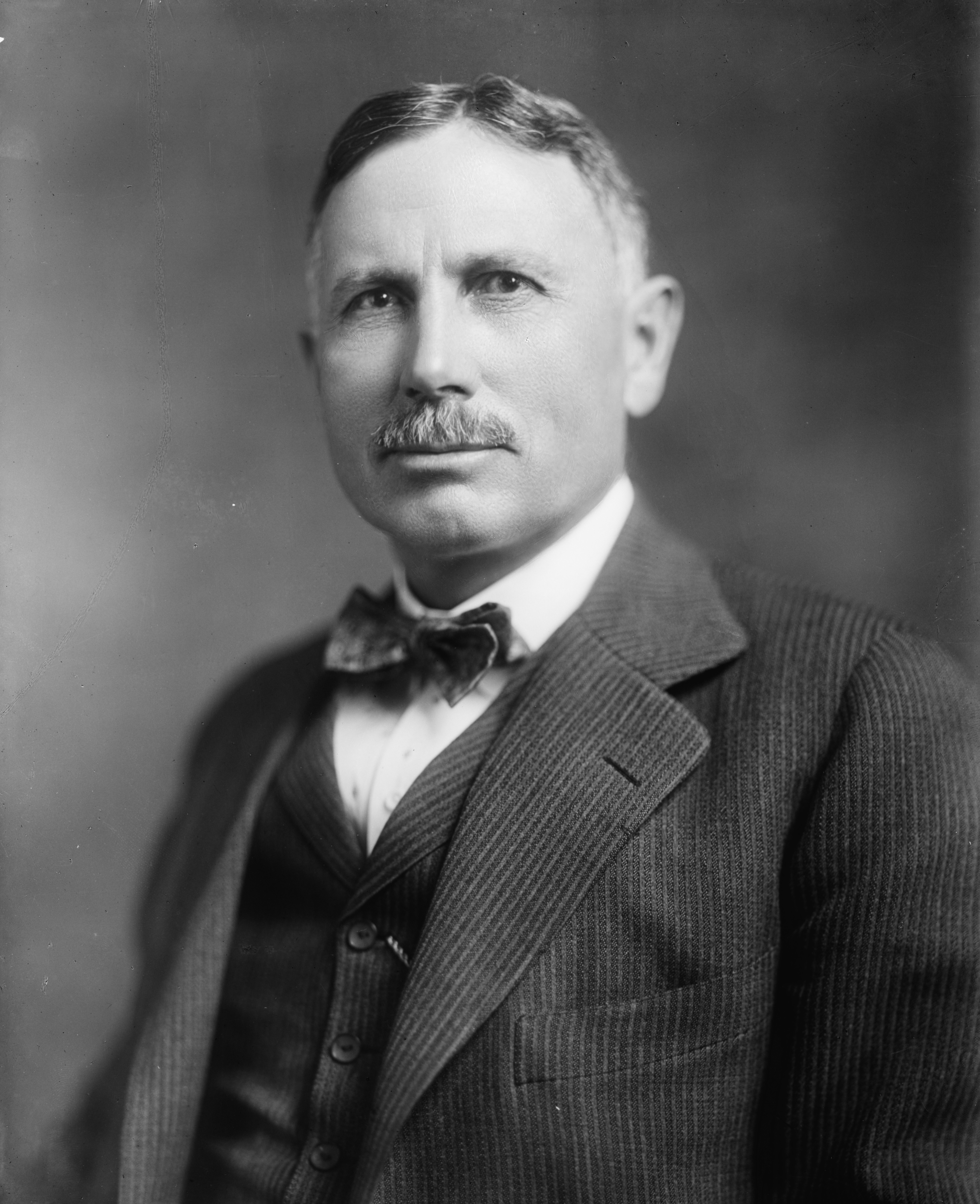
John B. Kendrick owner and builder of ranch

LX Bar Ranch State Historic Site is a historical ranch in Campbell County, Wyoming purchased in 1902, by John B. Kendrick (1857–1933), who later became a United States senator from Wyoming and the ninth governor of Wyoming. The ranch is a Wyoming Historical Landmarks.

== History ==
The LX Bar is located in the Powder River Basin northeast of Sheridan, about four miles south of the Montana border. The LX Bar Ranch has six stone buildings that Kendrick had built in 1910. Kendrick came to Wyoming in 1879 when he was 21-years old. He worked as a cowboy on the trails, herding Texas cattle. He started his own small herd and expanded to a large ranch of 210,000 acres in southern Montana and northern Wyoming. His LX Bar Ranch included: a five-bedroom house, a bunkhouse, a horse barn, cattle barn, a poultry barn, a hospital shed, an icehouse, a coal house, a kitchen/laundry house, and storage buildings. The stone buildings were built out of light-buff sandstone by a Swedish stonemason Oscar Husman of Sheridan. Oscar Husman also built buildings on the OW Ranch in Birney, Montana around 1902, now on the National Register of Historic Places listings in Big Horn County, Montana . The LX Bar ranch was in use until 1960 and then was abandoned. In 1910, Kendrick was elected to the Wyoming State Senate. He went on to be elected governor in 1914 and, before completing his term, was elected to the U.S. Senate in 1916, where he served until he died in 1933. Kendrick's ranch and herds were owned by the Kendrick Cattle Company. After this death, his family sold off the Ranch and the lands. The LX Bar Ranch was sold a few times, the buildings and fifty acres of land was acquired by the State of Wyoming in 2016. One of the owners before the state was musician Jim Guercio. Wyoming is working to improve the site and road before it opens.

== See also ==
- Camp Douglas (Wyoming)
