= Hynd =

Hynd is a surname. Notable people with the surname include:

- Harry Hynd (1900–1985), British politician
- John Burns Hynd (1902–1971), British politician
- Oliver Hynd (born 1994), British swimmer
- Roger Hynd (1942–2017), Scottish footballer
- Ronald Hynd (born 1931), English choreographer
- Sam Hynd (born 1991), British swimmer
- Tom Hynd (1930–2011), Australian businessman and politician

== See also ==
- Hynds
