= Edness Kimball Wilkins =

American politician

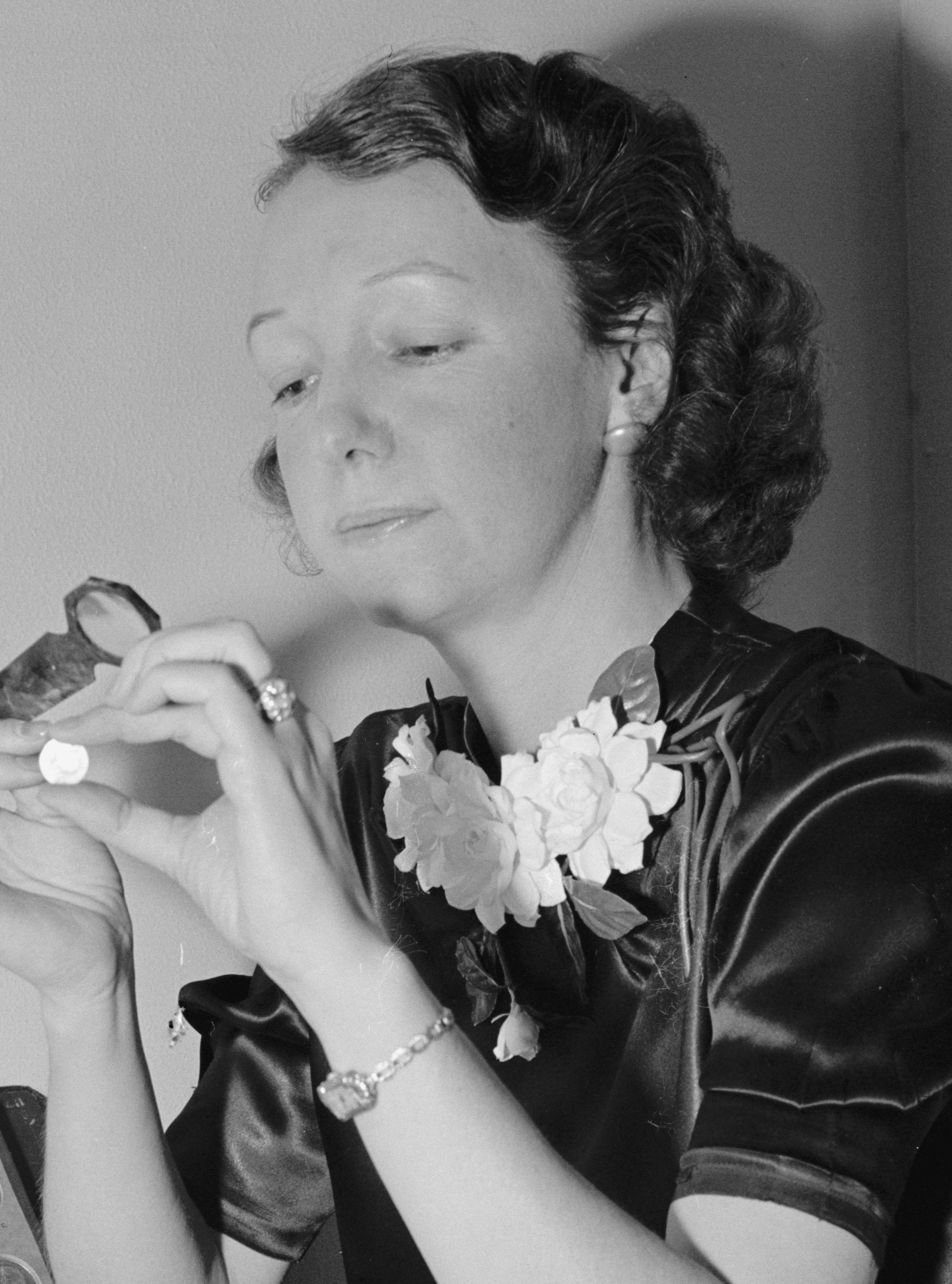

38th Speaker of the Wyoming House of Representatives
- In office May 30, 1966 – January 9, 1967
- Preceded by: Walter B. Phelan
- Succeeded by: William F. Swanton

Member of the Wyoming House of Representatives from Natrona County
- In office January 9, 1973 – July 15, 1980
- Succeeded by: Frank Chapman
- In office January 1955 – January 9, 1967

Member of the Wyoming Senate from Natrona County
- In office January 9, 1967 – January 12, 1971
- Succeeded by: Dick Tobin

Personal details
- Born: January 31, 1896 Casper, Wyoming, U.S.
- Died: July 15, 1980 (aged 84) Casper, Wyoming, U.S.
- Party: Democratic
- Spouse: Ronald Wilkins
- Education: University of Kentucky; University of Nebraska

Edness Kimball Wilkins (January 31, 1896 − July 15, 1980) was the first woman speaker of the Wyoming House of Representatives. As of 2024, she is the last Democrat to hold the position.

== Life ==
She was born Edness Kimball to parents Wilson, mayor of Casper, and Edness Merrick Kimball in Casper, Wyoming, on January 31, 1896. She studied at both the University of Nebraska and the University of Kentucky. She was married to Ronald Wilkins, and together they had one son. During her life she was an active member of the League of Women Voters.

== Career ==
She worked as an assistant for Nellie Tayloe Ross, the first woman to be governor of a US state, from 1931 to 1935 when Ross was director of the US Mint. Later, Wilkins ran the Water and Sanitation Department for Casper, Wyoming, from 1950 to 1953.

In 1954, Wilkins was elected for the first time to the Wyoming House of Representatives to represent Natrona County. She went on to serve five more terms in the state legislature.

Wilkins was originally rejected as Speaker, and instead Walter B. Phelan was elected Speaker of the House in 1965, despite the fact that Wilkins was leader of the majority party, the Democrats. At the time, she commented she was used to "stepping aside for the men". When Phelan died in 1966, as the leader of the majority party, Wilkins assumed the office of Speaker. However, because the House met only on odd numbered years and the next year Wilkins was elected to the State Senate, she never actually served in session as speaker.

In 1966, Wilkins ran for and won election to the Wyoming State Senate. She lost her bid for reelection in 1970. In 1972, she again won election to the Wyoming House of Representatives, and she continued to serve there until her death on July 15, 1980.

== Legacy ==
The Edness K. Wilkins State Park near Casper, Wyoming, was named for Wilkins.

== See also ==
- Speaker of the Wyoming House of Representatives

Political offices
Preceded by Walter B. Phelan	Speaker of the Wyoming House of Representatives; 1966–1967	Succeeded by William Swanton
