= Woodruff Cabin Site =

- U.S. National Register of Historic Places
- Woodruff Cabin in 1909

- Location within Wyoming Location within the United States
- Nearest city: Thermopolis, Wyoming
- Coordinates: 43°42′52″N 108°40′18″W
- Area: Less than one acre
- Built: 1871
- NRHP reference No.: 70000671
- Added to NRHP: February 26, 1970

The J.D. Woodruff Cabin Site is the location of the first European-American settlement in the Big Horn Basin of Wyoming. John Dwight Woodruff built a cabin on Owl Creek in Hot Springs County in 1871. Woodruff had befriended Chief Washakie of the Shoshone people and gained Washakie's permission to graze six thousand sheep in the area, one of the first large sheep operations in Wyoming. He ran cattle in the area during the 1880s.

The low log cabin was about 12 feet (3.7 m) by 20 feet (6.1 m), seven logs high, with an earth-covered roof. The interior featured an earth floor covered with buffalo hides.

John Dwight Woodruff was born in Broome County, New York on December 20, 1847. Woodruff is believed to have built the cabin principally as a winter trapping camp and as a base for prospecting in the early summer.

Woodruff sold the cabin to Captain R.A. Torrey of the U.S. Army garrison at Fort Washakie. Along with his brother, Colonel J.L. Torrey, Torrey expanded the operation, creating the Embar Ranch with forty thousand cattle and six thousand horses. The cabin was demolished at some point in the development of the ranch compound.

The site is marked by a monument composed of boulders and petrified wood with a tile image and a bronze plaque, giving an erroneous date of 1873 for the establishment of the camp. The monument is in poor condition and is out of place in its setting.

The Woodruff Cabin site was listed on the National Register of Historic Places in 1970.

== See also ==
- Wyoming Historical Landmarks
- List of the oldest buildings in Wyoming
