= Names Hill =

- U.S. National Register of Historic Places
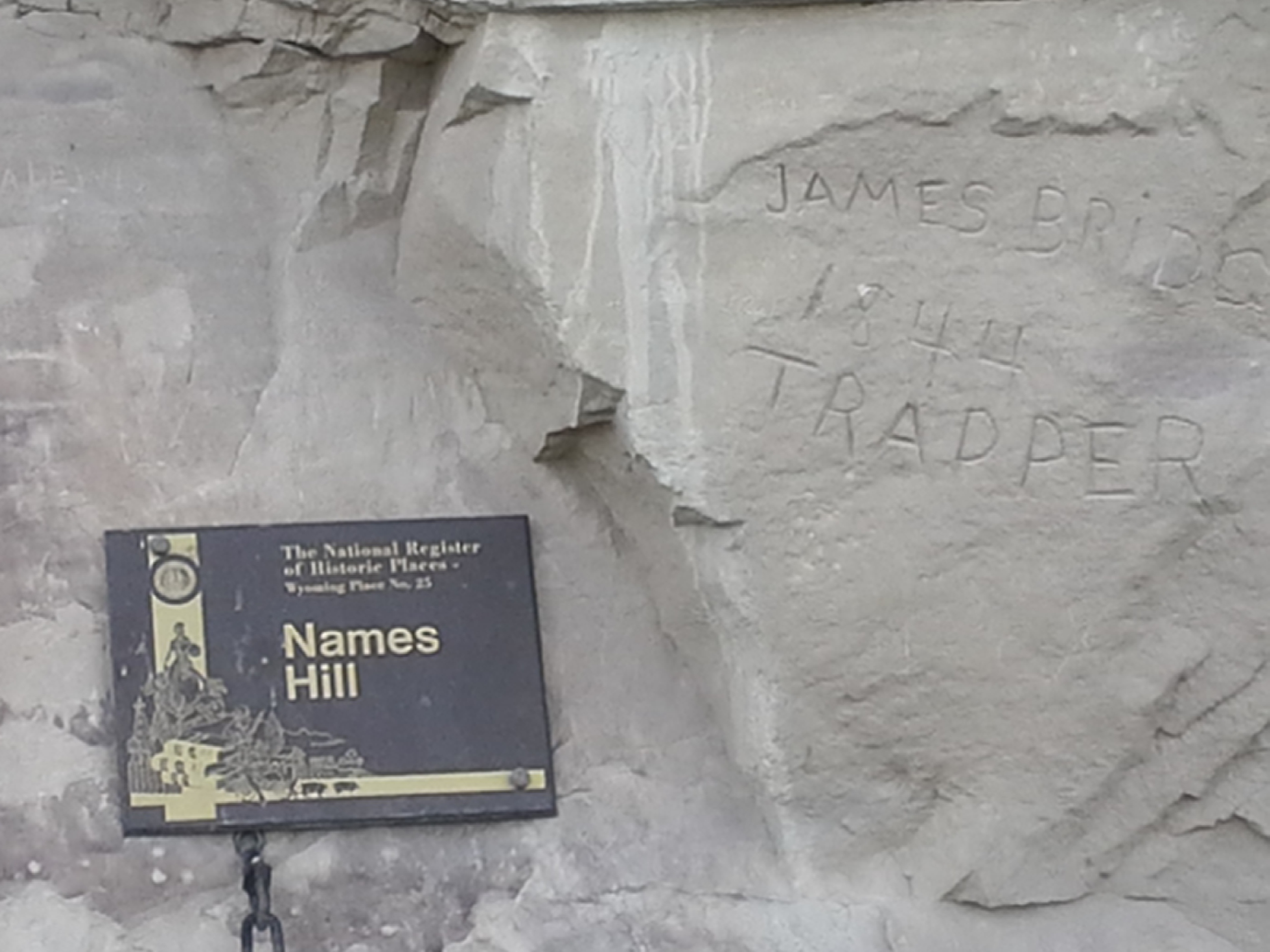
- The Jim Bridger inscription on Names Hill

- Location within Wyoming Location within the United States
- Location: On the Green River, 5 mi (8.0 km) south of LaBarge and west of U.S. Route 189
- Coordinates: 42°10′36″N 110°11′14.5″W
- Area: 4.5 acres (1.8 ha)
- Built: 1822
- NRHP reference No.: 69000193
- Added to NRHP: April 16, 1969

Names Hill is a bluff located on the bank of the Green River in the U.S. state of Wyoming, where travelers on the Oregon and California trails carved their names into the rock. It is one of three notable "recording areas" along the emigrant trails in Wyoming along with Register Cliff and Independence Rock. The site was listed on the National Register of Historic Places on April 16, 1969.

== History ==
Names Hill was located near a heavily used crossing of the Green River. The earliest human recordings at the site are Native American pictographs. European American names began appearing as early as 1822 as mountain men crossed the river on their way to the beaver streams of the Western Rocky Mountains. In 1844, Caleb Greenwood and Isaac Hitchcock lead the first wagon train over what would later be called the Sublette-Greenwood Cutoff along the way crossing the Green River at Names Hill. The wagon trains would rest at the Green River following a 40-mile (64 km) waterless trek across the prairie, providing an opportunity for travelers to add their names to the hill.

Among the more famous names inscribed on the rock is famed mountain man Jim Bridger. Some have disputed the authenticity of the signature as Bridger was thought to have been illiterate.

== See also ==
- Wyoming Historical Landmarks
- List of the oldest buildings in Wyoming
