= Seminoe Mountains =

Mountain range in Wyoming, United States

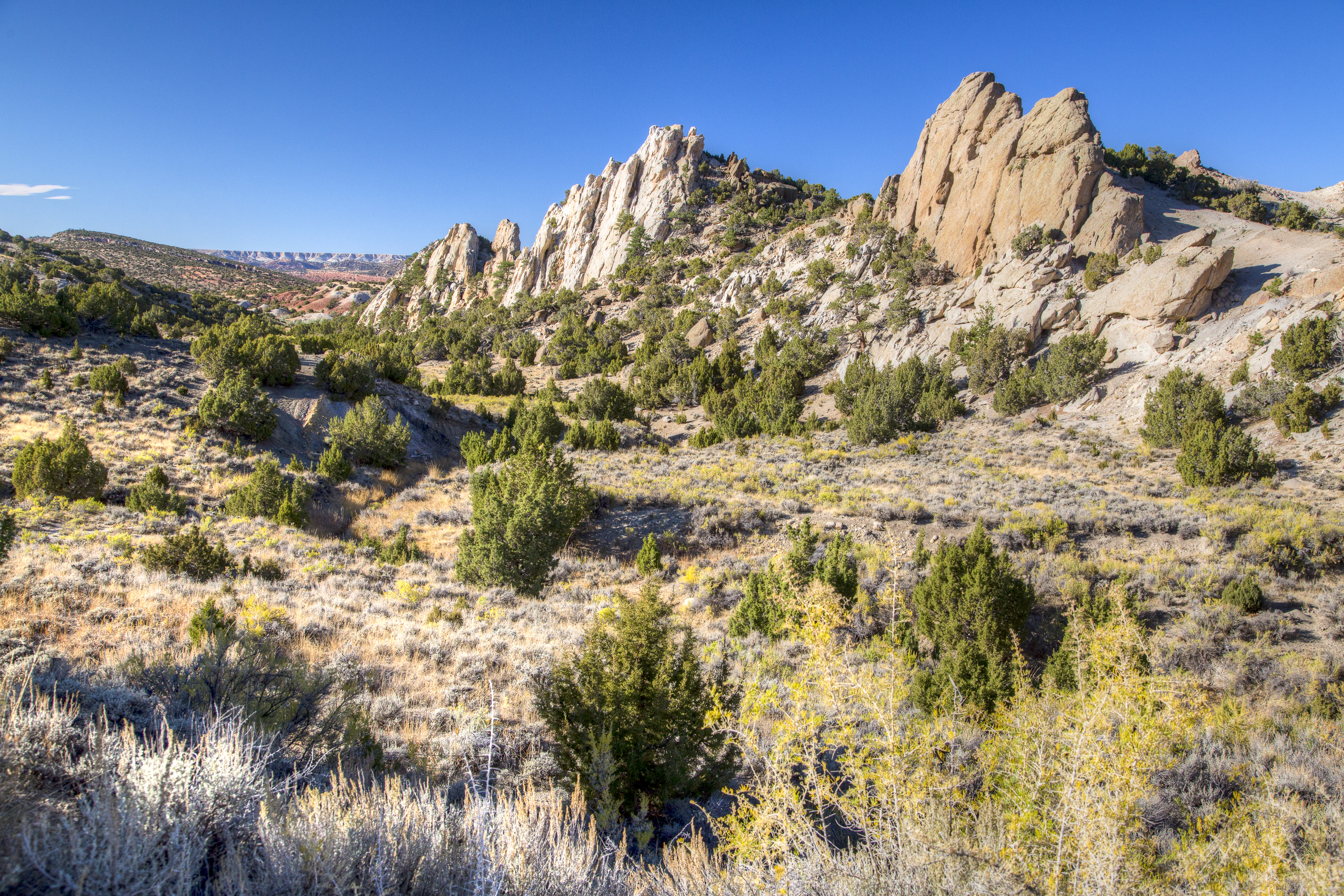
- The Seminoe to Alcova Byway

Highest point
- Peak: Bradley Peak
- Elevation: 8,949 ft (2,728 m)
- Coordinates: 42.14°N 106.90°W

Geography
- Location: Carbon County, Wyoming, U.S.
- Parent range: Rocky Mountains

Geology
- Rock age: Archean (approx. 2.7 Ga)

The Seminoe Mountains are a small mountain range in Carbon County, Wyoming. Located in the south-central portion of the state, the range forms a part of the northern boundary of the Seminoe Reservoir and is known for its rugged terrain, ancient Archean rock formations, and historical mining activity.

The name Seminoe is often mistakenly attributed to the Seminole tribe. It is actually an Americanized spelling of "Cimineau". The range was named for Basil Cimineau Lajeunesse, a French trapper and explorer who was active in the region during the 19th century.

In the late 1800s, the mountains were prospected for gold. Gold anomalies were identified at Bradley Peak, and iron ore deposits were also located in the late 1800s.

On August 7, 2020, a 1,600-acre fire started near Bradley Peak. Carbon County ordered some evacuations because of the fire. The cause was unknown.

== Geology ==
The mountains sit between 6,000 feet (1,800 m) and 8,000 feet (2,400 m) in elevation, and Bradley Peak is the primary landmark. The mountains contain some of the oldest rocks of the Wyoming Craton, some of which date back 2.7 billion years. The mountain contains komatiites, which are rare high-magnesium volcanic rocks with "spinifex" textures, indicating extremely high-temperature ancient lava flows. The mountains were shaped by the Laramide Uplift. The Seminoe Mountains are a part of the Seminoe Mountains greenstone belt.

== Recreation ==
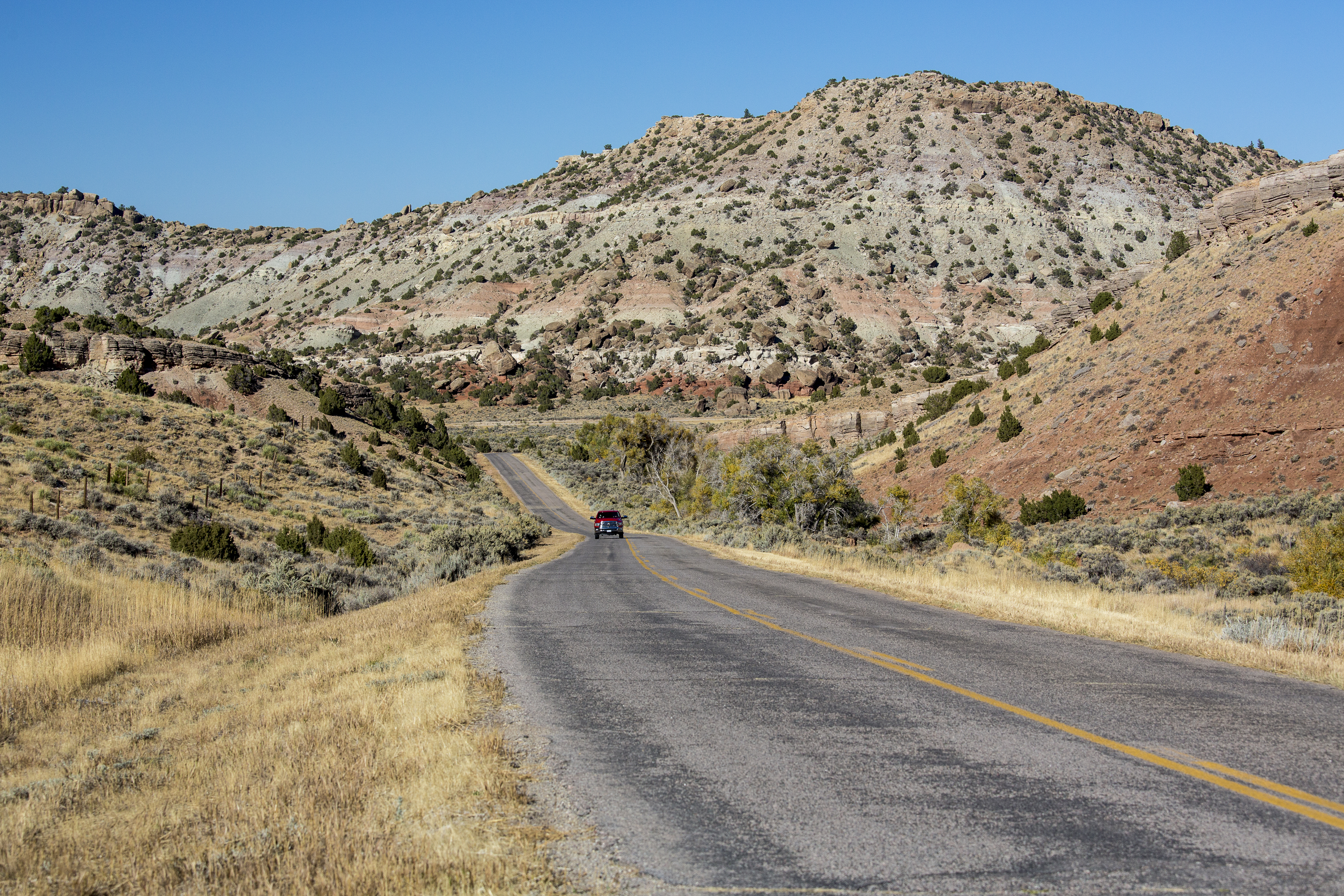
Seminoe Alcova Byway near Seminoe State Park

The Seminoe Mountains are a popular location for outdoor enthusiasts. Access to the mountains is via the Seminoe to Alcova Backcountry Byway, which is 64 miles in length. The byway offers access to the North Platte River, and local sand dunes. It spans from Alcova, Wyoming to Sinclair, Wyoming. Seminoe State Park, located at the base of the mountains, offers facilities for camping, boating, and fishing for walleye and trout.
