= Buffalo Bill Boyhood Home =

Historic house in Wyoming, United States

- U.S. National Register of Historic Places
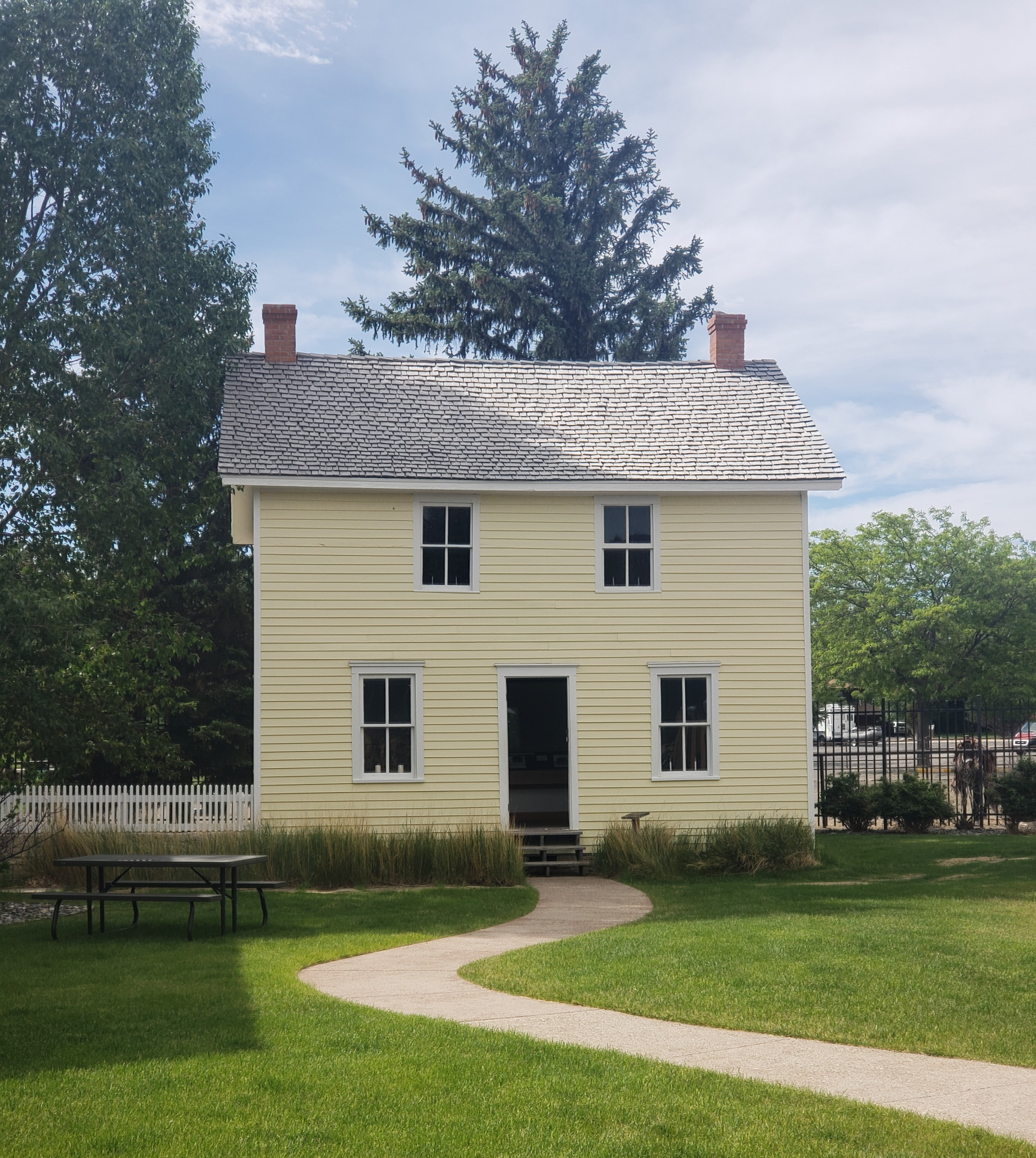
- Buffalo Bill Boyhood Home in 2020

- Location within Wyoming Location within the United States
- Location: 720 Sheridan Ave., Cody, Wyoming
- Coordinates: 44°31′27″N 109°4′25″W
- Built: 1841
- Architect: Isaac Cody
- NRHP reference No.: 75001906
- Added to NRHP: June 05, 1975

The Buffalo Bill Boyhood Home was built by Isaac Cody, the father of Buffalo Bill Cody in 1841 at LeClaire, Iowa. The house was purchased as a tourist attraction by the Chicago, Burlington and Quincy Railroad and was moved to Cody, Wyoming, Buffalo Bill's adopted hometown, in 1933.

The house was placed at the Chicago, Burlington and Quincy's Cody station to provide an attraction for tourists stopping in Cody on their way to or from Yellowstone National Park. Of necessity, groups had to spend the night at Cody, in the railroad's Burlington Inn next to the station, about two miles from town. The house was meant to provide the travelers with a diversion that would not require a trip into town. By 1947 the rail tour business was declining and the Burlington Inn was to be demolished. The Cody House was given to the Buffalo Bill Memorial Association and moved to its final location at the Buffalo Bill Museum in Cody. The house was again moved in 1969 when the museum moved into the Buffalo Bill Historical Center across the street from the old museum. The house is the oldest structure in the town of Cody, and may be the oldest building in Wyoming.

The two-story frame house has two rooms downstairs and two upstairs. A lean-to kitchen addition to the rear did not make the journey from Iowa to Wyoming. The house is constructed of sawn lumber with larger hand-hewn timbers.

The Cody House was placed on the National Register of Historic Places in 1975.
