= Frank Chapman (attorney) =

American attorney and politician

Member of the Wyoming House of Representatives from Natrona County
- In office August 12, 1980 – January 13, 1981
- Preceded by: Edness Kimball Wilkins
- Succeeded by: Esther Eskens

Personal details
- Born: Frank Raymond Chapman; October 7, 1950 (age 75) Craig, Colorado, U.S.
- Party: Democratic
- Spouse: Sharon (divorced)
- Children: 5
- Education: University of Wyoming

Frank Raymond Chapman (born October 7, 1950) is an American attorney and politician who served in the Wyoming House of Representatives. A 1976 graduate of the University of Wyoming College of Law, he worked as a special assistant attorney general in the criminal division of the Wyoming Attorney General's office before being named public defender of Laramie County in 1977. The following year, he was appointed by Governor Edgar Herschler as Wyoming's first state public defender.

On August 12, 1980, Chapman was appointed by the Natrona County commission to finish the unexpired term of state representative Edness Kimball Wilkins, who died in office the previous month. He sought election to a full term but was unsuccessful.

Chapman is currently a lawyer in private practice. He was president of the Wyoming Trial Lawyers Association for the 2016-17 term.

Wyoming House of Representatives
Preceded by Edness Kimball Wilkins	Wyoming State Representative from Natrona County; 1980–1981; Served alongside: Bill Bragg, William S. Curry, Russ Donley, Patrick Meenan, Warren A. Morton, Nyla Murphy, Charles Scott, Jack Sidi, Quincy Tarter	Succeeded by Esther Eskens
