= Hynds Lodge =

- U.S. National Register of Historic Places
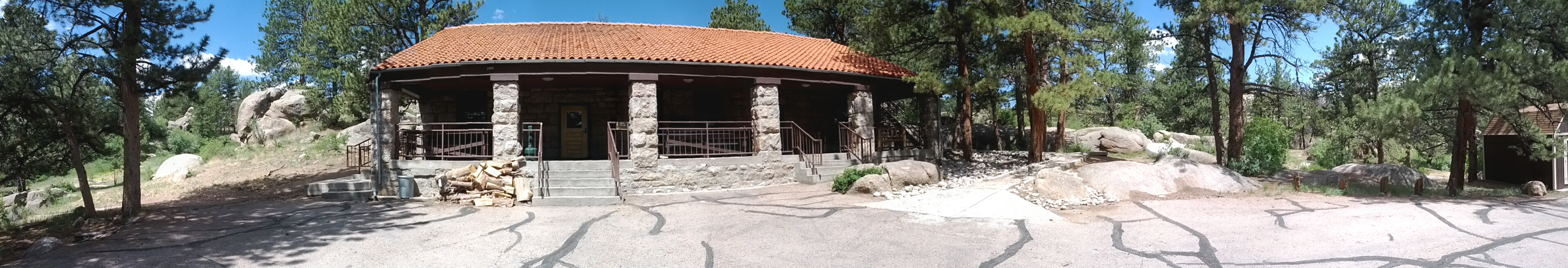
- Hynds Lodge

- Location within Wyoming Location within the United States
- Location: Halfway between Laramie, Wyoming and Cheyenne, Wyoming
- Coordinates: 41°11′46″N 105°15′21″W
- Area: 9 acres (3.6 ha)
- Built: 1922
- Architect: Harry P. Hynds
- NRHP reference No.: 84003685
- Added to NRHP: March 23, 1984

Hynds Lodge is a conference and accommodation lodge originally built by Cheyenne, Wyoming businessman Harry P. Hynds and donated to the Boy Scouts of America (BSA) in 1922. It is open from May 1 to October 1 by reservation only. It has accommodations for 30 people (max occupancy of 90), a large kitchen, dining room, living room, covered porch, stone fireplace and chimney, and 9 acres (3.6 ha) of land. The lodge was originally used by Wyoming Boy Scouts as a recreational camp. Later it was used by churches, social groups, and businesses. It was built on land that became part of Curt Gowdy State Park in 1971 and is now operated by the park. The south fork of Crow Creek lies nearby, with a granite outcrop and woodlands of cedar and spruce.

The lodge has many large trees around it, towering granite behind it, and is built into a hillside. Its construction with granite stone in ashlar masonry gives it a unique architectural style. The University of Wyoming's Department of Geology and Geophysics offers summer field courses in the area of the park and stays at the lodge. The lodge was added to the National Register of Historic Places on March 23, 1984.

Hynds arrived in Cheyenne in 1882 from Illinois. He began working as a blacksmith but in 1883 he acquired the first of several gambling saloons. This made him quite wealthy and he entered other businesses and also became a philanthropist. He was a founder of Frontier Days Rodeo. The Boy Scouts of America was very popular in Cheyenne by 1922 and their leadership approached him to help raise money for a cabin. Instead, Hynds paid for the cabin himself. The cabin was completed in the summer of 1922 and measures 36' x 35'. The lodge was operated by the Young Men's Literary Club for the Boy Scouts until 1935, when the City of Cheyenne took over. Many civic organizations have used it since, including the Boy Scouts. Major repair efforts were made in 1966. In 1971, the lodge and its land were leased to the Wyoming Recreation Commission by the City of Cheyenne.

== Gallery ==
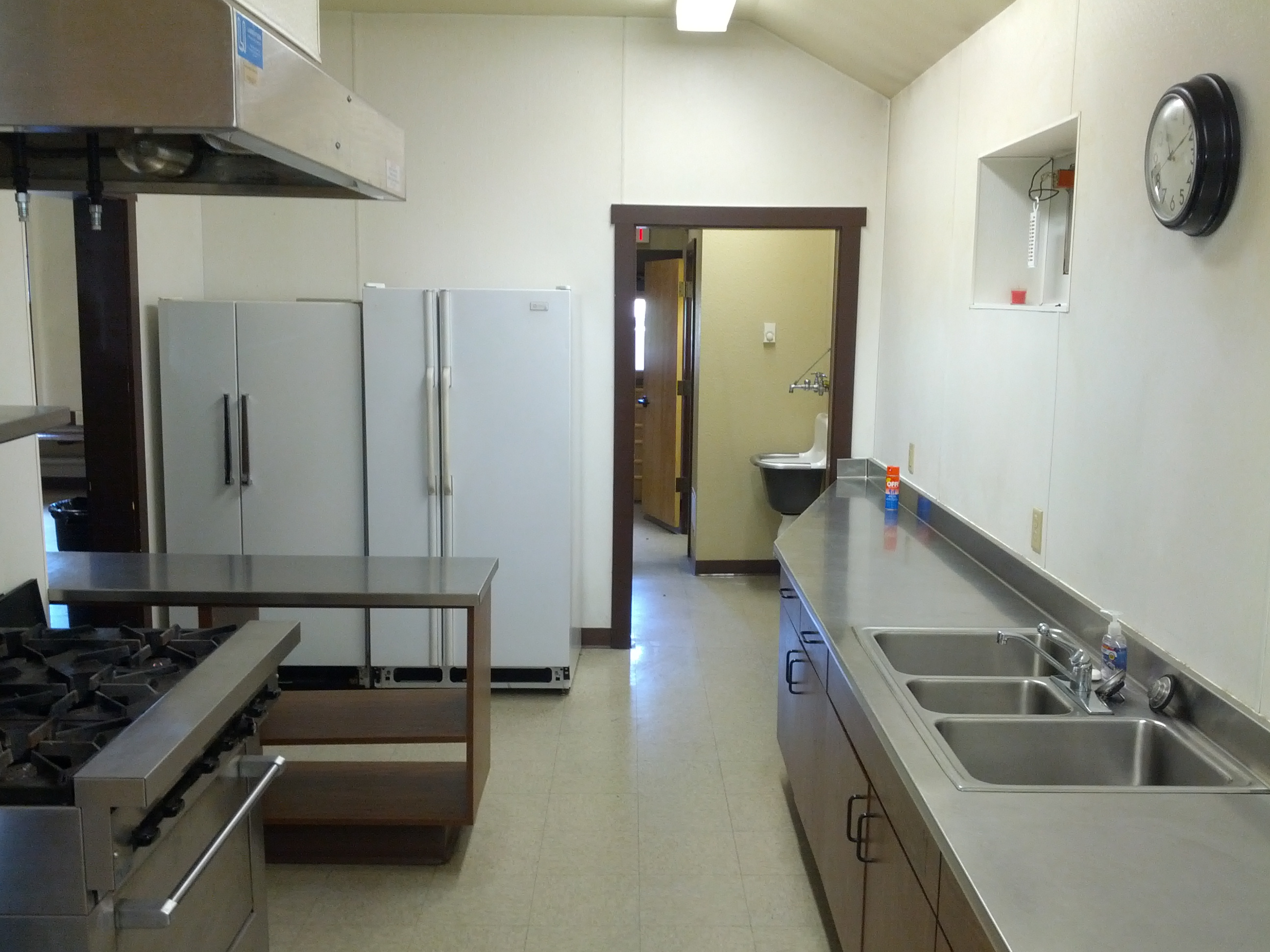
Hynds Lodge kitchen

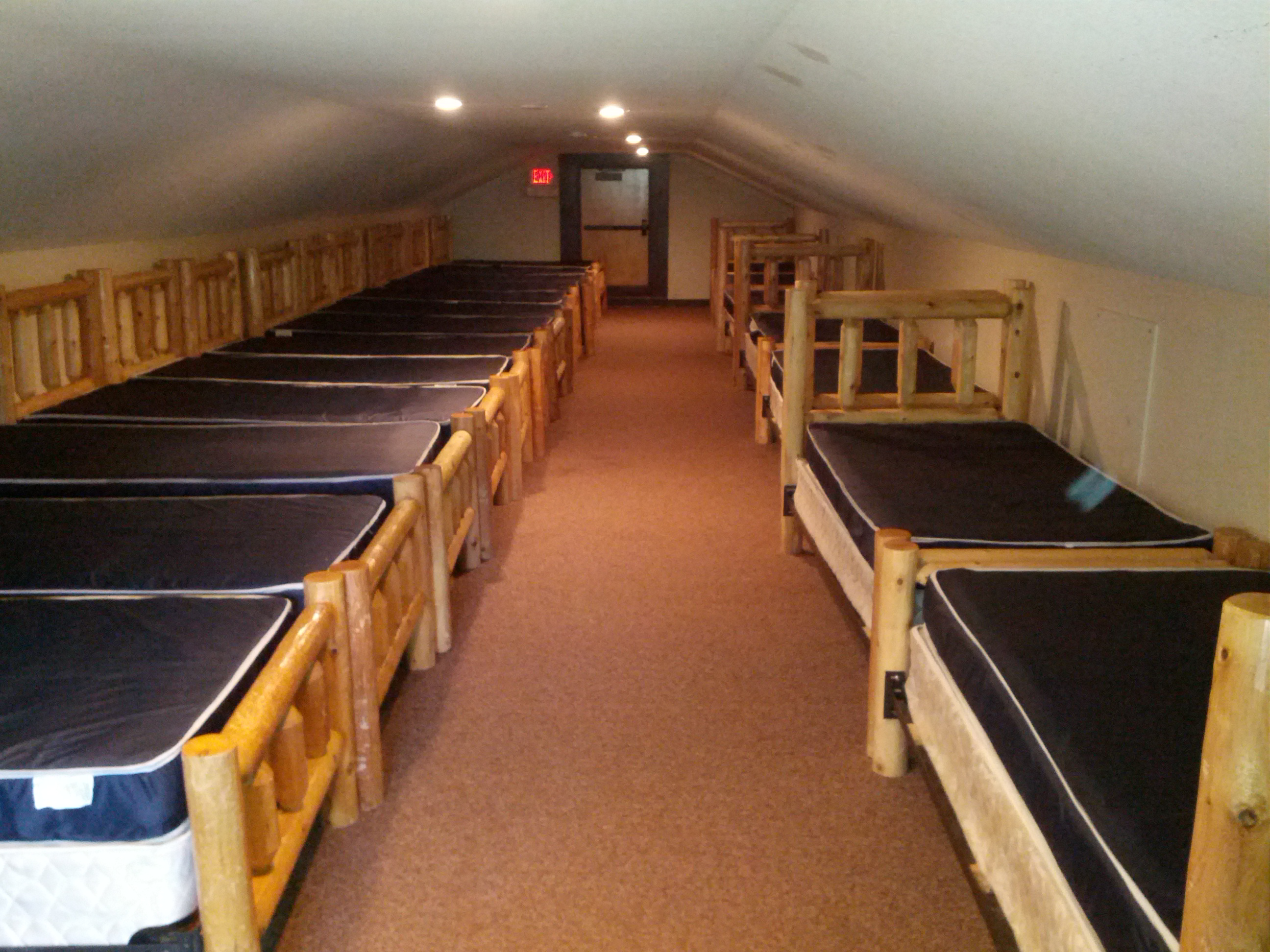
Hynds Lodge upstairs

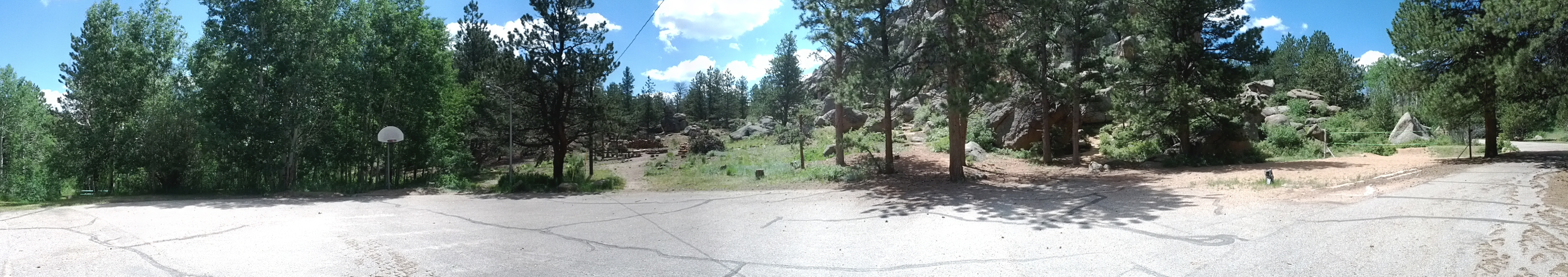
Panorama of the grounds in front of Hynds Lodge

== See also ==
- National Register of Historic Places listings in Laramie County, Wyoming
