= Medicine Lodge State Archeological Site =

- Medicine Lodge Creek Site
- U.S. National Register of Historic Places
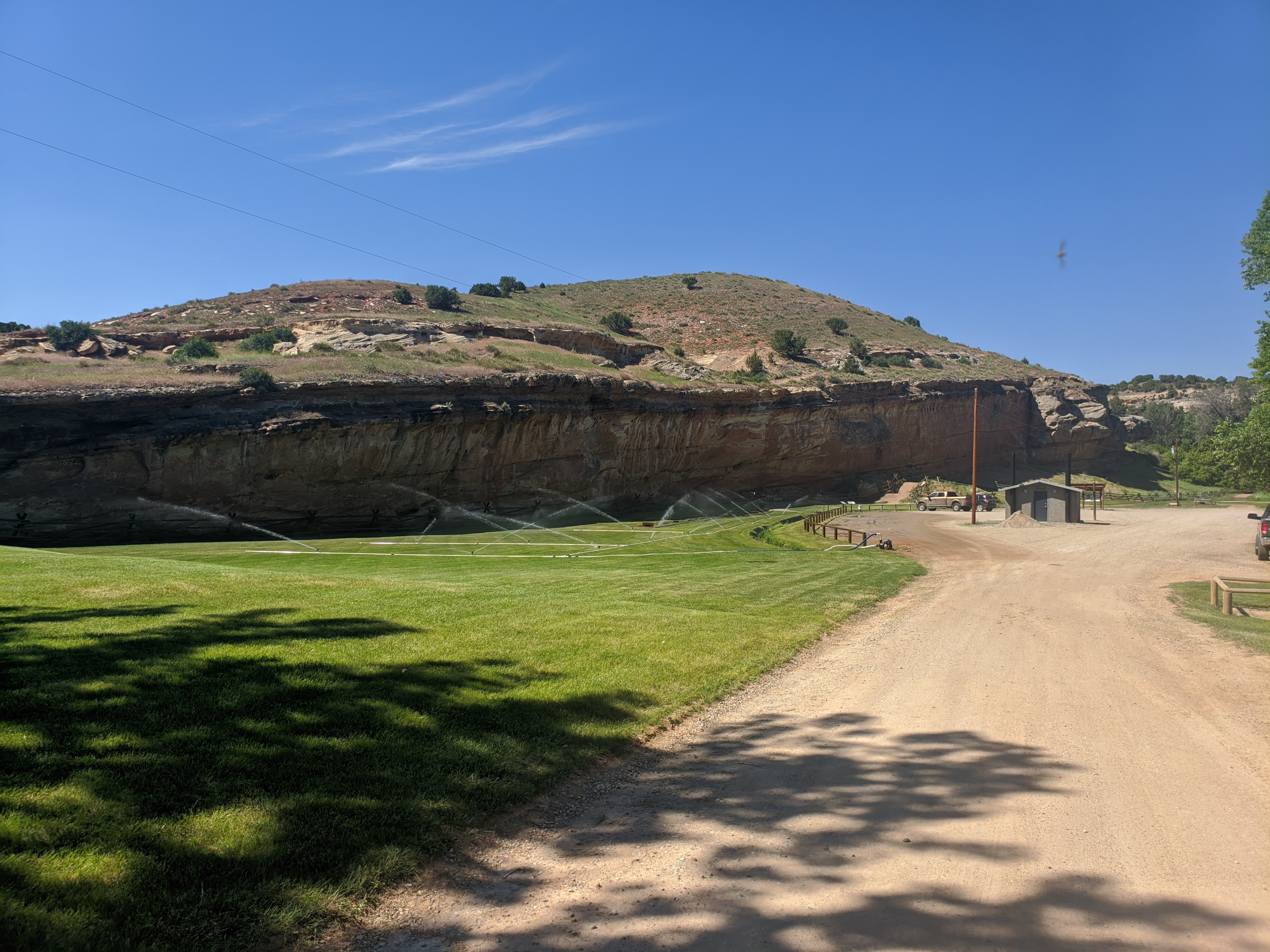

- Location within Wyoming
- Location: 4800 County Road 52, Hyattville, Wyoming
- Coordinates: 44°17′57.25″N 107°32′28.8″W
- Area: 8 acres (3.2 ha)
- NRHP reference No.: 73001926
- Added to NRHP: July 5, 1973

Medicine Lodge State Archaeological Site is a Wyoming state park that interprets the Medicine Lodge Creek Site, a prehistoric Native American archaeological site near Hyattville, Wyoming. It is administered by the Wyoming Division of State Parks and Historic Sites. The site is at the base of a steep limestone outcropping near the point where the dry and running portions of Medicine Lodge Creek join for a protected location with ready access to water. The site includes petroglyphs and pictographs on the rock face. An eight-year-long archaeological study beginning in 1968 discovered more than 60 cultural levels. These levels dated from the Paleoindian, Archaic, and Prehistoric periods. The site comprises a portion of the former Wickwire Ranch, which was purchased by the state in 1972 and is now about 12,000 acres (4,900 ha) of Medicine Lodge Wildlife Habitat Management Area. The archaeological site was designated in 1973. It was added to the National Register of Historic Places on July 5, 1973. The site is managed as a state park. Amenities include day-use areas, campgrounds, a visitor center, and an immersive cultural experience.
