= Oregon Trail Ruts =

- U.S. National Register of Historic Places
- U.S. National Historic Landmark
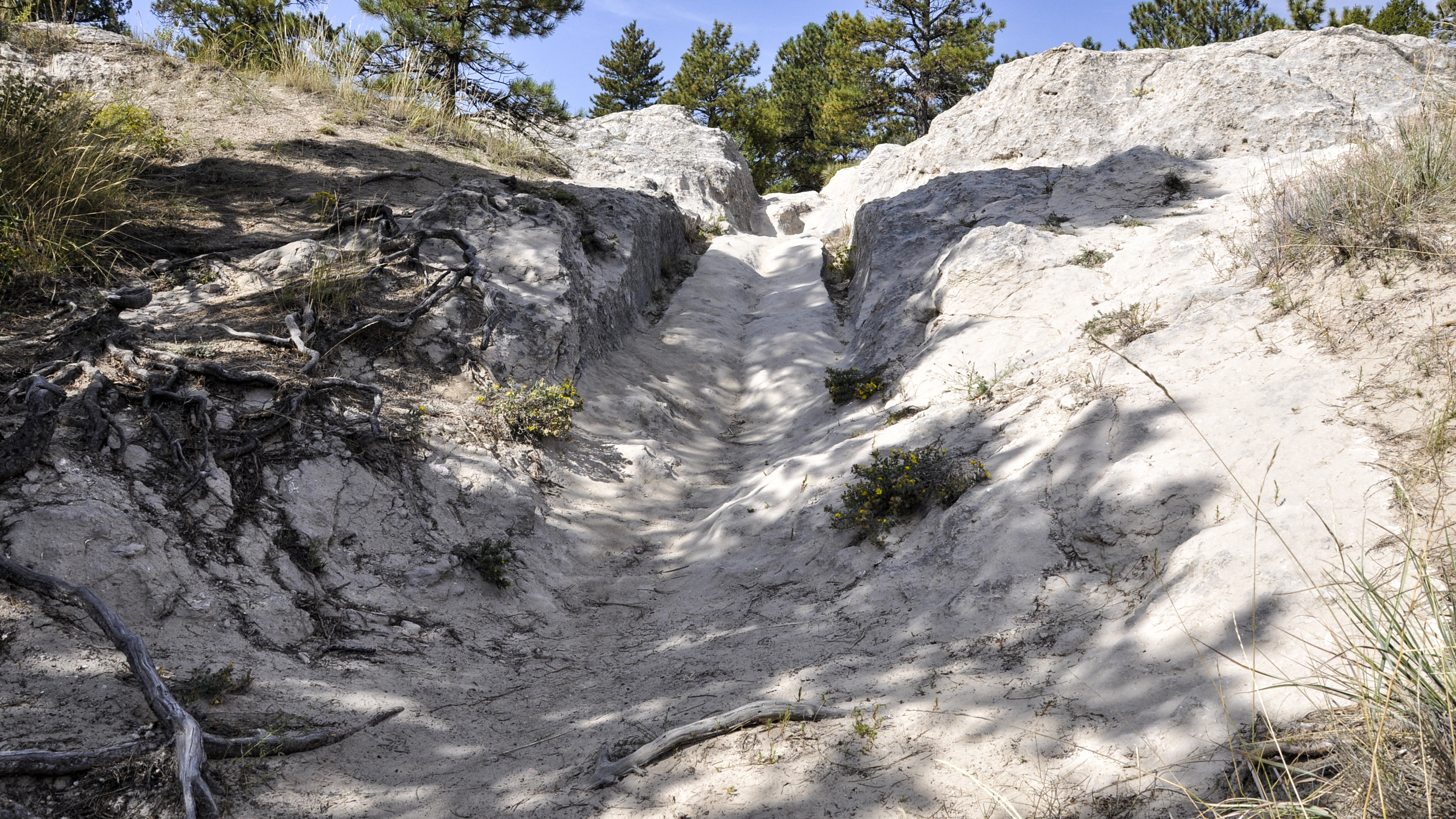
- Typical segment of the ruts

- Location within Wyoming Location within the United States
- Nearest city: Guernsey, Wyoming
- Coordinates: 42°15′22″N 104°44′58″W
- Built: 1841
- NRHP reference No.: 66000761

Significant dates
- Added to NRHP: October 15, 1966
- Designated NHL: May 23, 1966

Oregon Trail Ruts State Historic Site is a preserved site of wagon ruts of the Oregon Trail on the North Platte River, about 0.5 miles south of Guernsey, Wyoming. The Oregon Trail here was winding up towards South Pass. Here, wagon wheels, draft animals, and people wore down the trail into a sandstone ridge about two to six feet, during its heavy usage from 1841 to 1869. The half-mile stretch is "unsurpassed" and is the best-preserved set of Oregon Trail ruts anywhere along its former length.

The site is maintained as a state historic site, and was declared a National Historic Landmark and added to the National Register of Historic Places in 1966.

== History ==
The trail was first recorded in 1812, when Robert Stuart and six others came through there heading east from Fort Astoria, Oregon. Traders, trappers, and missionaries used this route before 1841 when the Bartleson–Bidwell Party became the first wagon train across the trail. The number of emigrants grew from 100 plus in 1842 to over 900 in 1843. With the completion of the Union Pacific Railroad in 1869, use of the trail as an overland route to the Pacific rapidly declined, although sections of it continued to be used locally for many years.

== Site ==
The trail ruts are 0.5 miles (0.80 km) long and are worn 2 to 6 feet (0.61 to 1.83 m) into a sandstone ridge. The route was chosen to avoid the marshy ground along the river. It is located on the south side of the North Platte River, 0.5 miles (0.80 km) south of the town of Guernsey.

== See also ==
- Wyoming Historical Landmarks
- List of the oldest buildings in Wyoming
