= List of the oldest buildings in Wyoming =

This article lists the oldest extant buildings in Wyoming, including extant buildings and structures constructed prior to and during the United States rule over Wyoming. Only buildings built prior to 1880 are suitable for inclusion on this list, or the building must be the oldest of its type.

In order to qualify for the list, a structure must:

- be a recognizable building (defined as any human-made structure used or intended for supporting or sheltering any use or continuous occupancy);
- incorporate features of building work from the claimed date to at least 1.5 metres (4.9 ft) in height and/or be a listed building.

This consciously excludes ruins of limited height, roads and statues. Bridges may be included if they otherwise fulfill the above criteria. Dates for many of the oldest structures have been arrived at by radiocarbon dating or dendrochronology and should be considered approximate. If the exact year of initial construction is estimated, it will be shown as a range of dates.

== List of oldest buildings ==
Building	Image	Location	First built	Use	Notes
Old Bedlam at Fort Laramie National Historic Site		Torrington, Wyoming	1849	Fort	Oldest building built in Wyoming
Fort Bridger		Fort Bridger, Wyoming	1858	Fort	Several 1858 buildings survive, including the sentry box and ruins of the commissary building and the old guardhouse.
Blacksmith shop at Fort Halleck (Wyoming)		Fort Halleck (Wyoming)	1860s	Fort	
Fort Fred Steele State Historic Site		Fort Fred Steele State Historic Site	1860s	Fort	
Fort Sanders (Wyoming)		Albany County, Wyoming	1869	Fort	
Wyoming Territorial Penitentiary		Laramie, Wyoming	1872	Penitentiary	
Jim Baker Cabin		Savery, Wyoming	1873		
Bath Ranch		Laramie, Wyoming	1875	Residence	
Durlacher House		Laramie, Wyoming	1875-1878	Residence	Queen Anne style house built by German immigrants.
Old Main (University of Wyoming)		Laramie, Wyoming	1886	University	Oldest University of Wyoming building
Rock Church (Auburn, Wyoming)		Auburn, Wyoming	1889	Church	One of oldest churches and buildings in Star Valley.

== Buildings built elsewhere and moved to Wyoming ==
Building	Image	Location	First built	Use	Notes
Buffalo Bill Boyhood Home		Cody, Wyoming	1841	Residence	Moved from LeClaire, Iowa in 1933 to Cody.

== See also ==
- National Register of Historic Places listings in Wyoming
- History of Wyoming
- Oldest buildings in the United States
