= Wyoming Division of State Parks and Historic Sites =

Government agency in Wyoming, United States

The Wyoming Division of State Parks and Historic Sites is the Wyoming state agency that administers its state parks. Wyoming Division of State Parks and Historic Sites maintains the 26 Wyoming Historical Landmarks.

Also known as Wyoming State Parks, Historic Sites & Trails, the agency is headquartered in Cheyenne, Wyoming.

== See also ==
- List of Wyoming state parks
- Wyoming historical monuments and markers
