= KTHE (Wyoming) =

- Former KTHE tower located near Hot Springs State Park
- Thermopolis, Wyoming; United States
- Broadcast area: Hot Springs County
- Frequency: 1240 kHz

Ownership
- Owner: Jerry and Steve Edwards; (Edwards Communications, LC)
- Sister stations: KDNO, KWYW, KFCW, KVOW

History
- First air date: August 17, 1955
- Last air date: September 2014
- Call sign meaning: Thermopolis

Technical information
- Facility ID: 33664
- Class: C
- Power: 1,000 watts (unlimited)
- Transmitter coordinates: 43°37′56″N 108°13′36″W

KTHE was an AM radio station licensed to Thermopolis, Wyoming, United States, and broadcast at 1240 kHz. The station last broadcast an adult standards format at the time of closure. It signed on in August 1955. The tower for KTHE was located near the mouth of Wind River Canyon. It was previously located just outside Hot Springs State Park next to its former studios. The studios were relocated to 420 Arapahoe Street in Thermopolis.

The station's license was surrendered for cancellation to the Federal Communications Commission (FCC) on September 3, 2014, and the FCC cancelled the license on September 8, 2014, leaving no locally licensed AM stations in Thermopolis. Edwards Communications had originally planned to develop KTHE however those plans did not go through. Before it signed off, the station was part of the Wind River Radio Network.

The station was once an affiliate of the University of Wyoming Cowboys football and basketball teams.

== History ==
KTHE was originally licensed August 17, 1955. In 1954 before the station even went on air, it faced opposition from KRAL in Rawlins, on the same frequency. KRAL had been operating since 1947, and it was thought that having a station in Thermopolis would cause interference to the station, roughly 137 miles (220 km) to the south. At the same time, KRAL would cause interference to KTHE.

It was owned by Thermopolis Broadcasting Company, before being sold in 1958 to Big Horn Basin Broadcasting Company. The original transmitter was located at 320 North Railroad Street in Thermopolis just outside of Hot Springs State Park. Radio stations broadcasting on "local" channels, commonly referred to now as graveyarders, were limited to 250 watts. This was relaxed in the 1960s and stations began upgrading to 1,000 watts. KTHE operated Monday through Sunday from 6 am through 7 pm due to staffing issues in the late 1960s. KTHE was operating at 1,000 watts by the 1980s.

== Signal ==
KTHE broadcast a 1,000 watt signal day and night. During the day, KTHE could be heard as far south as Lander, and as far east as Casper. KTHE could be received as far north as Greybull.
