= Boysen =

Boysen may refer to:

== People ==
- Boysen (surname), list of people with the surname

== Other uses ==
- Boysen Dam, rockfill dam in Wyoming, U.S.
- Boysen Reservoir, reservoir formed by Boysen Dam
- Boysen State Park, public recreation area surrounding the Boysen Reservoir
- Bert och Boysen, Swedish diary novel written by Anders Jacobsson and Sören Olsson
