= Boysen State Park =

Recreation area in Fremont County, Wyoming

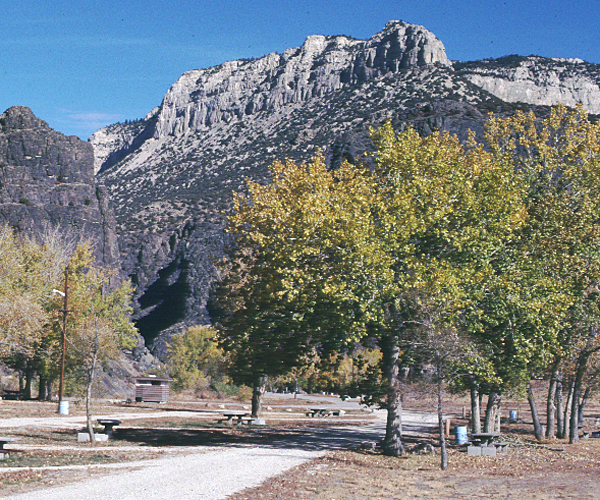

- Location within Wyoming
- Interactive map of Boysen State Park
- Location: Fremont County, Wyoming, United States
- Coordinates: 43°19′8″N 108°11′2″W
- Area: 35,952 acres (14,549 ha)
- Elevation: 4,728 ft (1,441 m)
- Established: 1956
- Administrator: Wyoming State Parks, Historic Sites & Trails
- Designation: Wyoming state park
- Named for: Asmus Boysen
- Website: Official website

Boysen State Park is a public recreation area surrounding the Boysen Reservoir, an impoundment of the north-flowing Wind River, in Fremont County, Wyoming. The state park covers more than 35,000 acres (14,000 ha) at the south end of the Owl Creek Mountains at the mouth of the Wind River Canyon.

== History ==
The park was established in 1956 following completion of the Boysen Dam in 1951. It is named for Asmus Boysen, who built the site's first dam in 1908. Part of the original dam can still be seen.

== Climate ==
According to the Köppen Climate Classification system, Boysen Dam has a cold semi-arid climate, abbreviated "BSk" on climate maps. The hottest temperature recorded at Boysen Dam was 108 °F (42 °C) on July 4, 1954, while the coldest temperature recorded was −39 °F (−39 °C) on January 31, 1979.

Climate data for Boysen Dam, Wyoming, 1991–2020 normals, extremes 1948–present
Month	Jan	Feb	Mar	Apr	May	Jun	Jul	Aug	Sep	Oct	Nov	Dec	Year
Record high °F (°C)	70 (21)	69 (21)	77 (25)	88 (31)	97 (36)	103 (39)	108 (42)	104 (40)	100 (38)	89 (32)	71 (22)	65 (18)	108 (42)
Mean maximum °F (°C)	48.9 (9.4)	55.5 (13.1)	67.8 (19.9)	77.9 (25.5)	86.2 (30.1)	94.3 (34.6)	100.1 (37.8)	97.8 (36.6)	92.4 (33.6)	80.3 (26.8)	63.6 (17.6)	52.0 (11.1)	100.4 (38.0)
Mean daily maximum °F (°C)	29.7 (−1.3)	37.2 (2.9)	50.4 (10.2)	58.7 (14.8)	68.7 (20.4)	80.8 (27.1)	90.5 (32.5)	88.5 (31.4)	76.5 (24.7)	60.4 (15.8)	44.4 (6.9)	31.3 (−0.4)	59.8 (15.4)
Daily mean °F (°C)	17.5 (−8.1)	24.0 (−4.4)	36.8 (2.7)	45.7 (7.6)	55.7 (13.2)	66.3 (19.1)	75.1 (23.9)	73.0 (22.8)	61.8 (16.6)	47.5 (8.6)	33.2 (0.7)	20.1 (−6.6)	46.4 (8.0)
Mean daily minimum °F (°C)	5.4 (−14.8)	10.7 (−11.8)	23.3 (−4.8)	32.7 (0.4)	42.7 (5.9)	51.8 (11.0)	59.7 (15.4)	57.4 (14.1)	47.1 (8.4)	34.5 (1.4)	22.1 (−5.5)	8.9 (−12.8)	33.0 (0.6)
Mean minimum °F (°C)	−11.7 (−24.3)	−8.1 (−22.3)	−5.3 (−20.7)	19.2 (−7.1)	30.2 (−1.0)	40.7 (4.8)	51.2 (10.7)	48.0 (8.9)	35.3 (1.8)	20.4 (−6.4)	6.6 (−14.1)	−8.1 (−22.3)	−16.4 (−26.9)
Record low °F (°C)	−39 (−39)	−36 (−38)	−21 (−29)	2 (−17)	20 (−7)	27 (−3)	41 (5)	38 (3)	16 (−9)	−3 (−19)	−15 (−26)	−36 (−38)	−39 (−39)
Average precipitation inches (mm)	0.22 (5.6)	0.32 (8.1)	0.57 (14)	1.10 (28)	2.08 (53)	1.01 (26)	0.75 (19)	0.46 (12)	0.96 (24)	0.90 (23)	0.28 (7.1)	0.37 (9.4)	9.02 (229.2)
Average snowfall inches (cm)	2.8 (7.1)	3.2 (8.1)	3.8 (9.7)	1.3 (3.3)	0.1 (0.25)	0.0 (0.0)	0.0 (0.0)	0.0 (0.0)	0.1 (0.25)	0.8 (2.0)	1.8 (4.6)	2.2 (5.6)	16.1 (40.9)
Average precipitation days (≥ 0.01 in)	2.9	3.5	4.1	5.9	8.1	5.9	5.0	4.1	4.8	4.3	3.3	3.7	55.6
Average snowy days (≥ 0.1 in)	1.8	2.1	2.0	0.9	0.1	0.0	0.0	0.0	0.1	0.8	1.3	2.0	11.1
Source 1: NOAA
Source 2: National Weather Service

== Activities and amenities ==
The park offers multiple campgrounds, boat launches, and a privately operated marina. Game fish found in the reservoir include walleye, sauger, perch, crappie, ling, rainbow, cutthroat, and brown trout.
