= Bridger Mountains (Wyoming) =

Subrange of the Rocky Mountains

Coordinates: 43°30′N 107°51′W

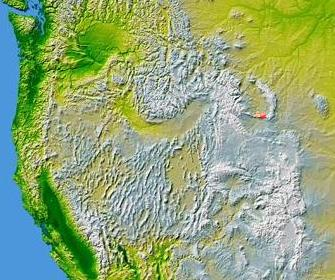
The Bridger Mountains in Wyoming

The Bridger Mountains are a short subrange of the Rocky Mountains, approximately 40 miles (64 km) long, in central Wyoming in the United States. The range forms a bridge between the Owl Creek Mountains to the west and the southern end of the Bighorn Mountains to the east. The Wind River passes through the gap between the range and the Owl Creek Mountains. Bridger Creek passes through the gap between the range and the Bighorns. The highest point in the range is Copper Mountain at 8,317 feet (2,535 m).

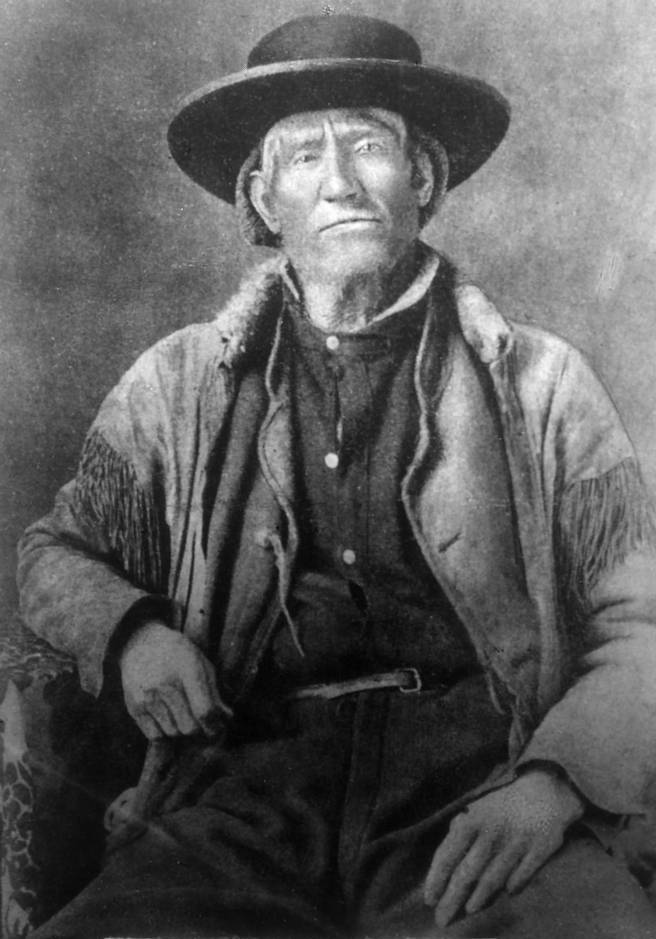
The mountains are named for Jim Bridger

The range is named after Jim Bridger, who pioneered the Bridger Trail through the mountains from southern Wyoming into the Bighorn Basin in 1864. Bates Creek in the eastern part of the range is the location of Bates Battlefield, a significant battle on July 4, 1874, in which the U.S. Army soldiers from Camp Brown (Today's Fort Washakie) with 167 Shoshone scouts attacked the village of Chief Black Coal (Northern Arapaho), killing at least 34 Northern Arapahos.

A trail running through the mountains starts southeast of Shoshoni, Wyoming ending north of Thermopolis, Wyoming.

== See also ==
- List of mountain ranges in Wyoming
