= KTAK (FM) =

- Riverton, Wyoming; United States
- Frequency: 93.9 MHz

Programming
- Format: Country music
- Affiliations: Fox News Radio; Westwood One

Ownership
- Owner: Edwards Group Holdings, Inc., Employee Stock Ownership Trust; (Edwards Communications LC)
- Sister stations: KDNO, KFCW, KVOW, KWYW

History
- First air date: November 22, 1977

Technical information
- Licensing authority: FCC
- Facility ID: 56590
- Class: C1
- ERP: 50,000 watts
- HAAT: 290 meters (950 ft)
- Transmitter coordinates: 42°43′10″N 108°8′45″W
- Repeaters: 104.1 K281BF (Riverton); 106.3 K292BA (Dubois)

Links
- Public license information: Public file; LMS
- Webcast: Listen live
- Website: rivertonradio.com/index.php/stations/ktak

KTAK (93.9 MHz) is an FM radio station licensed to Riverton, Wyoming, United States, broadcasting a country music format. The station is currently owned by the Edwards Group Holdings, Inc., Employee Stock Ownership Trust, through licensee Edwards Communications LC, and features programming from CBS News Radio and Westwood One. The transmitter is located southeast of Riverton on Beaver Rim.

The station received a construction permit for 93.5 MHz on May 12, 1976. The station received call letters in July of that year. The station would not receive its license to cover until November 11, 1977. The station was owned by Riverton Broadcasting, along with sister station KVOW. The transmitter was located northwest of Riverton at an existing tower farm. Initially it was only broadcasting with 3,000 watts. The station moved to 93.9 in the early 1980s and its power was significantly increased. The station was sold to Edwards Communications in 1999.

In the fall of 2021, the station and its sister stations were operated under a time brokerage agreement by Radio Central, after the stations were donated by Jerry Edwards.

In September 2023, the station, along with its sisters moved to a new studio on Main Street, co-located with the town's newspaper, The Riverton Ranger. Along with the move to the new studio, Edwards Communications also upgraded its other stations transmitters southeast of Riverton on Beaver Rim (KFCW), and northeast on Copper Mountain (KDNO, KWYW).

KVOW and KTAK were originally at 603 East Pershing Avenue in Riverton.

== Translators ==
Since KTAK is located southeast of Riverton, it uses two translators to improve coverage. K281BF 104.1, although licensed to Riverton, primarily covers Lander. K292BA 106.3 is licensed to Dubois, and extends KTAK's coverage to the northwestern parts of Fremont County.
