= KVOW =

- Riverton, Wyoming; United States
- Broadcast area: Fremont County
- Frequency: 1450 kHz

Programming
- Format: Talk/Personality
- Affiliations: Cumulus Media, ESPN Radio, Westwood One

Ownership
- Owner: Edwards Group Holdings, Inc., Employee Stock Ownership Trust; (Edwards Communications LC)
- Sister stations: KDNO, KFCW, KTAK, KWYW

History
- First air date: 1948
- Former call signs: KWRL (1948–1961)

Technical information
- Licensing authority: FCC
- Facility ID: 56591
- Class: C
- Power: 1,000 watts unlimited
- Transmitter coordinates: 43°1′35″N 108°20′45″W

Links
- Public license information: Public file; LMS
- Webcast: Listen Live
- Website: www.rivertonradio.com

KVOW (1450 AM) is a radio station broadcasting a Talk/Personality format. Licensed to Riverton, Wyoming, United States, the station is owned by Edwards Group Holdings, Inc., Employee Stock Ownership Trust, through licensee Edwards Communications LC.

== History ==
KVOW began broadcasting as KWRL in September 1948, with 250 watts of power. In the early 1950s, it aired a religious program known as Herald of Truth.

The transmitter was located one mile south of Riverton near Wyoming Highway 789, on the south bank of the Wind River. In 1961, the station changed its call sign to KVOW. The station was allowed to increase its power to 1,000 watts in 1962. At the time, the studios were located near the transmitter.

In September 2023, the station, along with its sisters moved to a new studio on Main Street, co-located with the town's newspaper, The Riverton Ranger. Along with the move to the new studio, Edwards Communications also upgraded its other stations transmitters southeast of Riverton on Beaver Rim (KFCW, KTAK), and northeast on Copper Mountain (KDNO, KWYW). KVOW and KTAK were originally at 603 East Pershing Avenue in Riverton.

KVOW is an affiliate of the Colorado Rockies baseball team.
