= Booysen =

Booysen is an Afrikaans surname, also spelled Booyze, Booyse and Booysens. It is related to the English surname Boyce and Boysen in other Germanic languages.

The Stamvader Boy Booysen was the first of the generation of the Booysen family which was born in Germany and arrived in South Africa in the mid-17th century. He was a resident of Stellenbosch and Drakenstein in the Cape. The genealogy of the family can also be traced back to other stamvaders including Karl Booysen-Brùndolf, Pierre Joubert (Jaubert) and Jean Durand.

== Coat of arms ==
Booysen coat of arms

The Booysen coat of arms is green and gold with a bear standing on a helmet holding a bow. The green represents hope, joy, and loyalty in love. The gold represents generosity of wealth and elevation of the mind. The bear represents strength and ferocity in the protection of one's family. The bow represents a readiness for battle. The shape of the shield, with the flat top, rounded bottom and small central point, is the shape of a continental shield, suggesting that the bearer had much land, wealth and had explored.

The shield divided into quarters contains another image of the bear holding a bow in the top right segment. The top left and bottom right segments depict an oak tree with acorns, signifying strength, continuous growth (in mind/wisdom), and fertility. The bottom left segment is divided once more and is of a five-point star which represents a noble person/divine quality form above. The other half of that segment is half of a fleur-de-lis which represents purity and light (and may also represent that the bearer had a connection with France).

== Notable people named Booysen ==
- Anene Booysen, 17-year-old girl from Bredasdorp, South Africa, raped and killed in February 2013
- Beandri Booysen, A person famous for having Progeria who died at 19-years old.
- Cecile Booysen, doctor, peace activist, and promoter of birth control
- David Booysen, rugby league footballer of the 1920s for Other Nationalities, and Wigan
- David Booysen (footballer), association (soccer) footballer for Maritzburg United F.C.
- Dawid Booysen, South African shot put record holder in 1970, won the British AAA Championships in 1967, father of Henk Booysen
- Henk Booysen, Gold medal in shot put at the 1995 All-Africa Games and 1996 African Championships
- Jaco Booysen, Rugby league player for South Africa in two World Cups
- Jimmy Booysen, Silver medal recipient of Order of Mendi for Bravery in 2004
- Marco Booysen, South African Archery gold medallist in 2017
- Mario Booysen, South African football defender
- Stefanes Booysen, honorary professor at the School of Accountancy at the University of Pretoria
