= KTHE =

KTHE may refer to:

- KJFK-FM, a radio station (96.3 FM) licensed to serve Llano, Texas, United States, which held the call sign KTHE from 2016 to 2022
- KTHE (Wyoming), a defunct radio station (1240 AM) formerly licensed to serve Thermopolis, Wyoming, United States
- KTHE (Keep The Hotel Empty), a YouTube-based interview based podcast hosted by Aric Paul and produced by Seth Stahlmann in Sarasota, Florida.
