= Copper Mountain (Wyoming) =

Mountain in Wyoming, United States

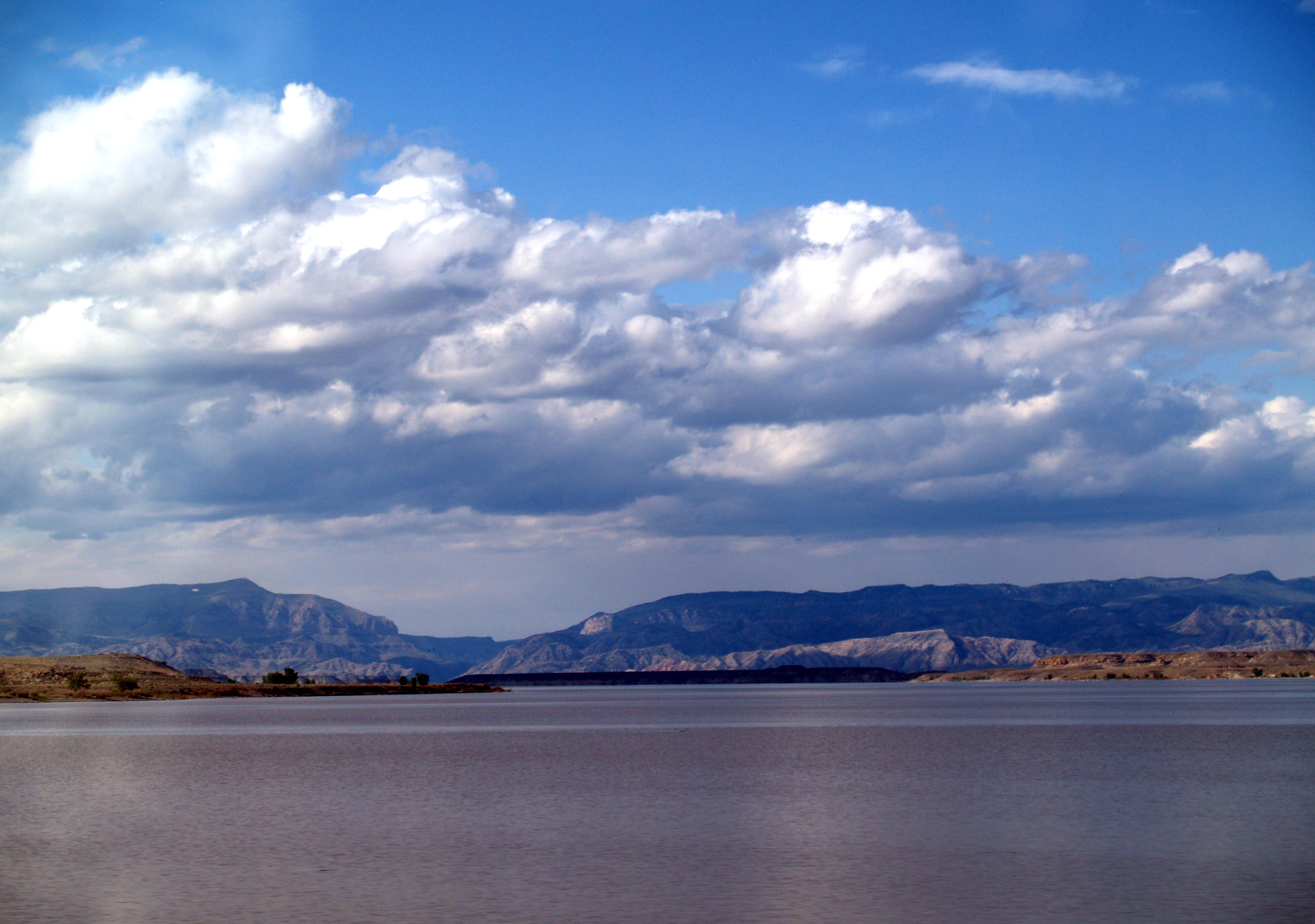
- Copper Mountain is visible on the right side of this image of Boysen Reservoir. To the left are the Owl Creek Mountains.

Highest point
- Elevation: 8,312 ft (2,533 m)
- Prominence: 2,021 ft (616 m)
- Coordinates: 43°27′34″N 107°56′41″W

Geography
- Location within Wyoming
- Location: Fremont County, Wyoming, U.S.
- Parent range: Bridger Mountains

Climbing
- Easiest route: Access Road

Copper Mountain is a roughly 8,312 feet (2,533 m) mountain in the Bridger Mountains, a small range that straddles the Fremont and Hot Springs County line.

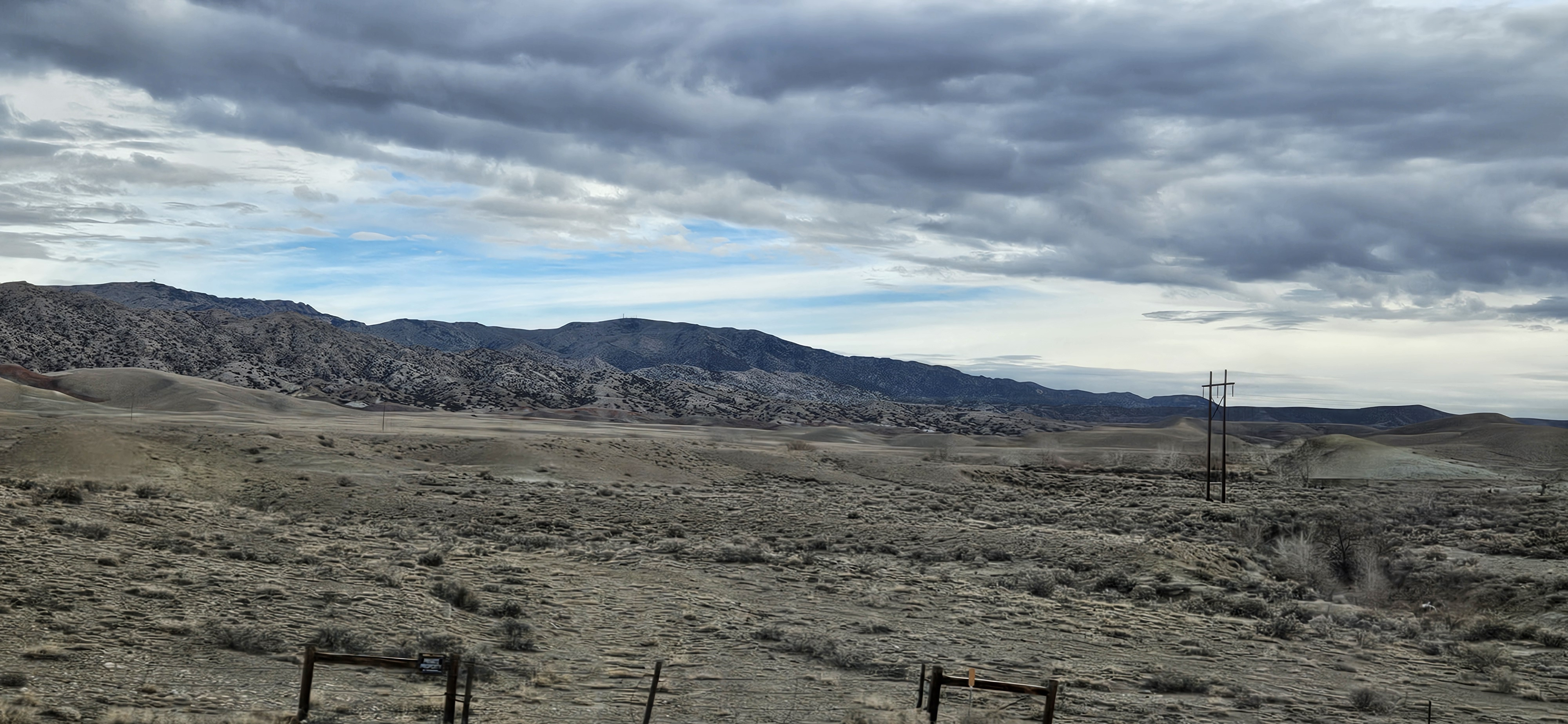
The radio towers on Copper Mountain.

The range rises north of Shoshoni, and is split by Wind River Canyon. The Owl Creek Mountains are west of Wind River Canyon. Copper Mountain is also sometimes known as Bridger's Mountain. Copper Mountain is part of a larger BLM owned parcel known as The Copper Mountain Wildlife Study area, which encompasses 6,858 acres. Most of the mountain is scattered limber pine and juniper with rocky slopes. Nearby Boysen Reservoir is visible from Copper Mountain. The area is popular for hikers, hunters, and rock climbers, which has caused conflicts with local ranchers.

== Geology ==
Copper Mountain is features Archean rocks of the Wyoming Craton and is overlain in the southern part by Cenozoic sedimentary rocks. Lithium-bearing pegmatite (otherwise known as igneous rock containing crystals) has been found on Copper Mountain, including amblygonite, lepidolite, iron-manganese phosphates, columbite, tapiolite and beryl.

== Mining ==
Copper Mountain is home to several mines, including those for uranium. Three of the four uranium mines in Wyoming are still producing. The Arrowhead Mine on Copper Mountain produced around 500,000 pounds of Uranium in the 1960s and 70s. Copper Mountain was also mined for iron, some of which was discovered in the 1950s.

== Radio/Television uses ==
Edwards Communications, based in nearby Riverton, Wyoming, operates two radio stations from a tower on Copper Mountain. KDNO 101.7 FM is licensed to Thermopolis, while KWYW 99.1 FM is licensed to Lost Cabin. When the stations moved their studio location to Main Street in Riverton, both KWYW and KDNO also received upgrades at the time. Wyoming Public Radio's KUWT 91.3 FM, licensed to Thermopolis, also broadcasts from the mountain. Wyoming Public Radio also has two other stations on Copper Mountain, KTWY 97.1 FM, carrying an adult alternative format known as "Wyoming Sounds", and KWWY 106.5 FM, carrying a classical format. The last station that shares a tower on Copper Mountain is known as KUDA (FM), on 89.9 FM, licensed to Bonneville, Wyoming. That station is known as "Wyoming's Hot Spot" in reference to the nearby hot springs in Thermopolis.

In addition to radio stations, Copper Mountain provides a large coverage area for television stations in central Wyoming. KFNE Riverton, channel 10, broadcasts from the mountain. Casper television stations KTWO-TV and KGWC have translators on the mountain, as does Wyoming Public Television, based out of Lander.

Amateur radio users have repeaters on the mountain, two with the call sign W7BEQ. One repeater receives 146.805 MHz and transmits on 146.205 MHz. The other repeater receives at 446.825 MHz and transmits at 441.825 MHz. A third repeater with the call sign W0KGB receives on 444.375 MHz and transmits on 449.375 MHz There is also a repeater on Copper Mountain used for Automatic Packet Reporting System, or APRS, known as W7BEQ. It uses 144.390 MHz.

== See also ==
- List of mountain ranges in Wyoming
