= KTRZ =

KTRZ may refer to:

- KTRZ (FM), a radio station (105.5 FM) licensed to serve Taos, New Mexico, United States
- KFCW, a radio station (93.1 FM) licensed to serve Riverton, Wyoming, United States, which held the call sign KTRZ from 1984 to 2014
