= Lysite, Wyoming =

- Unincorporated community
- Location within the state of Wyoming Lysite (the United States)
- Coordinates: 43°16′05″N 107°41′25″W
- Country: United States
- State: Wyoming
- County: Fremont
- Elevation: 5,276 ft (1,608 m)
- Time zone: UTC-7 (Mountain (MST))
  - Summer (DST): UTC-6 (MDT)
- ZIP codes: 82642
- Area code: 307
- GNIS feature ID: 1609118

Lysite (also Lysaght) is an unincorporated rangeland village in northeastern Fremont County, Wyoming, United States. It lies along local roads northeast of the city of Lander, the county seat of Fremont County. The Bridger Trail passed near Lysite on its way north to the gold fields of Montana in the 19th century.

Currently, the village consists of a natural gas business, a highway maintenance facility, and a small store, all located at the rear of the village; an abandoned former store and post office edifice at the entry to the village; an abandoned small school in the middle of the village; and a few homes, both in use and abandoned, scattered in between.

== Geography and climate ==
Lysite has a borderline cool semi-arid (Köppen BSk)/cool arid (BWk) climate, characterized by hot summers with cool mornings, alongside frigid and extremely dry winters. During a drought in 1960, Lysite recorded 1.28 inches or 32.5 millimeters of precipitation for the entire calendar year. This remains the lowest calendar year precipitation total recorded in Wyoming, and the lowest anywhere in the United States outside the Southwest.

Climate data for Lysite, Wyoming
Month	Jan	Feb	Mar	Apr	May	Jun	Jul	Aug	Sep	Oct	Nov	Dec	Year
Mean daily maximum °F (°C)	30 (−1)	38 (3)	47 (8)	57 (14)	67 (19)	78 (26)	88 (31)	87 (31)	76 (24)	60 (16)	42 (6)	34 (1)	59 (15)
Mean daily minimum °F (°C)	1 (−17)	9 (−13)	19 (−7)	28 (−2)	37 (3)	45 (7)	51 (11)	49 (9)	38 (3)	28 (−2)	14 (−10)	6 (−14)	27 (−3)
Average precipitation inches (mm)	0.2 (5.1)	0.1 (2.5)	0.4 (10)	0.8 (20)	1.8 (46)	1.0 (25)	0.7 (18)	0.6 (15)	0.8 (20)	1.0 (25)	0.3 (7.6)	0.2 (5.1)	7.9 (199.3)
Average snowfall inches (cm)	3.1 (7.9)	2.7 (6.9)	2.8 (7.1)	2.6 (6.6)	1.1 (2.8)	0.0 (0.0)	0.0 (0.0)	0.0 (0.0)	0.6 (1.5)	1.1 (2.8)	2.7 (6.9)	2.9 (7.4)	19.6 (49.9)
Average precipitation days	1	0	2	3	5	3	3	2	2	3	1	1	26
Average snowy days	1	1	1	0	0	0	0	0	0	0	1	1	5
Source: Google/NOAA

== Economy ==
The village has the Lost Cabin Gas Plant and Madden natural gas field, owned and operated by Contango Resources.

== Arts and culture ==
The J.B. Okie mansion is located in Lysite. Lysite has an old one room schoolhouse, library, and a combined general store-post office building, all no longer in use. Most of the residents own cows and horses, and most residents have some background in agriculture. Every summer the community hosts a series of mini rodeos called the gymkhanas. On Labor Day, Lysite hosts a large rodeo, including a night of Ranch Rodeo.

== Education ==
Public education in the community of Lysite is provided by Fremont County School District #24. The district has three campuses – Shoshoni Elementary School (grades PK-6), Shoshoni Junior High School (grades 7–8) and Shoshoni High School (grades 9–12).
