= Shoshoni, Wyoming =

- Town
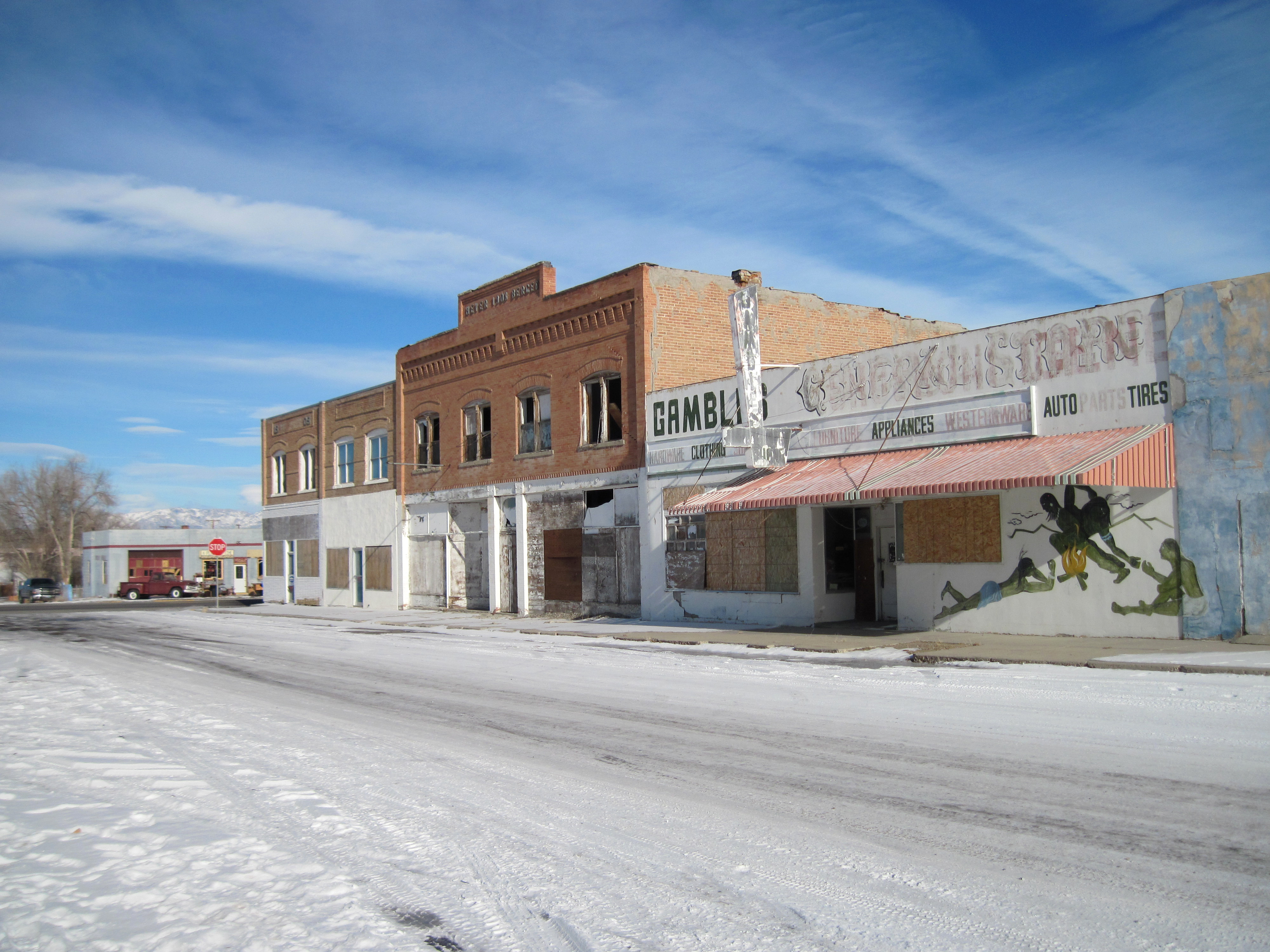
- Part of downtown Shoshoni, 2012

- Location of Shoshoni in Fremont County, Wyoming
- Coordinates: 43°14′25″N 108°06′52″W
- Country: United States
- State: Wyoming
- County: Fremont

Area
  - Total: 3.58 sq mi (9.28 km^{2})
  - Land: 3.58 sq mi (9.28 km^{2})
  - Water: 0 sq mi (0.00 km^{2})
- Elevation: 4,843 ft (1,476 m)

Population (2020)
  - Total: 471
  - Density: 131/sq mi (50.8/km^{2})
- Time zone: UTC−7 (Mountain (MST))
  - Summer (DST): UTC−6 (MDT)
- ZIP code: 82649
- Area code: 307
- FIPS code: 56-70570
- GNIS feature ID: 2413281
- Website: townofshoshoni.org

Shoshoni is a town in Fremont County, Wyoming, United States. The population was 471 at the 2020 census, a 27.4% decline from 649 at the 2010 census.

== History ==
The town is named for the Shoshone Indian tribe, most of whom live on the nearby Wind River Indian Reservation. Established as a railroad and mining town, Shoshoni lies at the intersection of U.S. Routes 20 and 26, which together were formerly known as the "Yellowstone Highway". Shoshoni has a dramatic increase in visitors in the summer, when roads to Yellowstone National Park are open. Visitors also stop to camp and fish at nearby Boysen Reservoir and the surrounding Boysen State Park. Anglers participate in fishing derbies at the reservoir, including an ice fishing derby in the winter.

Ranching is, and has been for decades, the major agricultural endeavor in the nearby area.

Charles Henry King, a prominent millionaire businessman and banker later based in Omaha, Nebraska, built the C.H. King Company and First Union Bank Building, formerly occupied by Yellowstone Drug Store. The building is listed on the National Register of Historic Places. King and his wife Martha were the paternal grandparents of President Gerald Ford, who was born in their Omaha house in July 1913.

In 2004 a water-intensive mushroom processing plant began operation on land that was annexed by the town and put within its limits. At first it was staffed by prison labor, who were paid minimum wage, in a prison industries program. When they had trouble with production, the plant hired skilled labor from Guatemala. This labor practice stopped when a Department of Homeland Security investigation revealed that some of the workers had problems with their immigration histories. More recently, the plant has ensured all migrant workers are legal. During operations, the plant's composting bunkers emitted unpleasant odors, resulting in numerous complaints from residents during 2005. The Wyoming Department of Environmental Quality investigated the situation and air quality issues. The plant installed a stack and ventilating system in early 2006 to control and disperse odor from the composting bunkers. In 2009, the facility was up put up for sale and purchased in January 2020 by Iglesia Ni Cristo, a Philippines-based religious sect with the intent of using local "honor based" labor to work in the facility.

== Geography ==
According to the United States Census Bureau, the town has a total area of 3.58 square miles (9.27 km^{2}), all land.

=== Climate ===
According to the Köppen Climate Classification system, Shoshoni has a cold desert climate, abbreviated "BWk" on climate maps. The hottest temperature recorded in Shoshoni was 106 °F (41 °C) on July 16, 1935, and July 10, 1939, while the coldest temperature recorded was −44 °F (−42 °C) on January 5, 1942.

Shoshoni's closest body of water is Boysen Reservoir, which is also the confluence of the Wind River, Badwater Creek and Poison Creek. As the water exits the dam it flows into the Wind River Canyon and joins the Big Horn River at the Wedding of the Waters at the canyon egress.

Climate data for Shoshoni, Wyoming, 1991–2020 normals, extremes 1931–present
Month	Jan	Feb	Mar	Apr	May	Jun	Jul	Aug	Sep	Oct	Nov	Dec	Year
Record high °F (°C)	60 (16)	65 (18)	82 (28)	88 (31)	96 (36)	102 (39)	106 (41)	103 (39)	100 (38)	87 (31)	72 (22)	64 (18)	106 (41)
Mean maximum °F (°C)	45.3 (7.4)	53.1 (11.7)	68.9 (20.5)	78.8 (26.0)	96.1 (35.6)	95.1 (35.1)	99.0 (37.2)	96.7 (35.9)	91.2 (32.9)	77.7 (25.4)	66.3 (19.1)	51.7 (10.9)	99.2 (37.3)
Mean daily maximum °F (°C)	27.9 (−2.3)	36.3 (2.4)	52.8 (11.6)	62.0 (16.7)	70.3 (21.3)	81.9 (27.7)	90.3 (32.4)	88.2 (31.2)	76.9 (24.9)	60.5 (15.8)	43.0 (6.1)	28.5 (−1.9)	59.9 (15.5)
Daily mean °F (°C)	14.5 (−9.7)	23.8 (−4.6)	38.4 (3.6)	47.5 (8.6)	56.0 (13.3)	66.1 (18.9)	73.9 (23.3)	71.4 (21.9)	61.4 (16.3)	46 (8)	31.3 (−0.4)	16.8 (−8.4)	45.6 (7.6)
Mean daily minimum °F (°C)	1.2 (−17.1)	11.3 (−11.5)	24.0 (−4.4)	32.9 (0.5)	41.6 (5.3)	50.4 (10.2)	57.5 (14.2)	54.5 (12.5)	46.0 (7.8)	32.4 (0.2)	19.6 (−6.9)	5.1 (−14.9)	31.4 (−0.3)
Mean minimum °F (°C)	−17.3 (−27.4)	−14.0 (−25.6)	3.5 (−15.8)	18.1 (−7.7)	28.5 (−1.9)	40.9 (4.9)	48.5 (9.2)	43.9 (6.6)	33.7 (0.9)	15.2 (−9.3)	1.3 (−17.1)	−16.7 (−27.1)	−24.9 (−31.6)
Record low °F (°C)	−44 (−42)	−42 (−41)	−18 (−28)	1 (−17)	21 (−6)	27 (−3)	41 (5)	31 (−1)	17 (−8)	−9 (−23)	−23 (−31)	−30 (−34)	−44 (−42)
Average precipitation inches (mm)	0.23 (5.8)	0.37 (9.4)	0.34 (8.6)	1.03 (26)	1.84 (47)	1.01 (26)	0.76 (19)	0.48 (12)	0.86 (22)	0.59 (15)	0.30 (7.6)	0.18 (4.6)	7.99 (203)
Average snowfall inches (cm)	3.2 (8.1)	3.5 (8.9)	2.5 (6.4)	1.7 (4.3)	0.4 (1.0)	0.0 (0.0)	0.0 (0.0)	0.0 (0.0)	0.1 (0.25)	1.0 (2.5)	2.2 (5.6)	2.9 (7.4)	17.5 (44.45)
Average precipitation days (≥ 0.01 in)	1.4	1.8	2.3	4.6	7.1	4.6	3.4	3.1	3.7	3.2	1.9	1.4	38.5
Average snowy days (≥ 0.1 in)	1.8	2.0	1.5	0.9	0.2	0.0	0.0	0.0	0.1	0.6	1.5	2.2	10.8
Source 1: NOAA
Source 2: National Weather Service (mean maxima and minima 2006–2020)

== Demographics ==
Historical population
Census	Pop.	Note	%±
1910	604		—
1920	561		−7.1%
1930	263		−53.1%
1940	226		−14.1%
1950	891		294.2%
1960	766		−14.0%
1970	562		−26.6%
1980	879		56.4%
1990	497		−43.5%
2000	635		27.8%
2010	649		2.2%
2020	471		−27.4%
U.S. Decennial Census

=== 2020 census ===
As of the census of 2020, there were 471 people and 237 households residing in the town. The population density was 181.3 inhabitants per square mile (70.0/km^{2}). There were 278 housing units at an average density of 94.1 per square mile (36.3/km^{2}). The racial makeup of the town was 89.3% White, 0.6% African American, 1.4% Native American, 0.0% Asian, 2.3% from other races, and 6.1% from two or more races. Hispanic or Latino of any race were 7.8% of the population.

There were 237 households, of which 23.9% had children under the age of 18 living with them, 39.7% were married couples living together, 17.3% had a female householder with no husband present, 36.9% had a male householder with no wife present, and 35.3% were non-families. 30.6% of all households were made up of individuals, and 16.3% were age 65 or older. The average family size was 4.06.

The median age in the town was 40.4 years. 35.2% of residents were under the age of 20; 8.0% were between the ages of 20 and 24; 29.5% were from 25 to 44; 41.0% were from 45 to 64; and 21.9% were 65 years of age or older. The gender makeup of the town was 51.0% male and 49.0% female.

=== 2010 census ===
As of the census of 2010, there were 649 people, 278 households, and 180 families residing in the town. The population density was 181.3 inhabitants per square mile (70.0/km^{2}). There were 337 housing units at an average density of 94.1 per square mile (36.3/km^{2}). The racial makeup of the town was 91.1% White, 1.1% African American, 5.1% Native American, 0.6% Asian, 0.6% from other races, and 1.5% from two or more races. Hispanic or Latino of any race were 9.6% of the population.

There were 278 households, of which 32.0% had children under the age of 18 living with them, 45.7% were married couples living together, 12.2% had a female householder with no husband present, 6.8% had a male householder with no wife present, and 35.3% were non-families. 30.6% of all households were made up of individuals, and 13.7% had someone living alone who was 65 years of age or older. The average household size was 2.33 and the average family size was 2.83.

The median age in the town was 39.3 years. 25.7% of residents were under the age of 18; 7% were between the ages of 18 and 24; 24.5% were from 25 to 44; 29.2% were from 45 to 64; and 13.6% were 65 years of age or older. The gender makeup of the town was 51.0% male and 49.0% female.

=== 2000 census ===
As of the census of 2000, there were 635 people, 246 households, and 171 families residing in the town. The population density was 192.1 people per square mile (74.1/km^{2}). There were 322 housing units at an average density of 97.4 per square mile (37.6/km^{2}). The racial makeup of the town was 93.39% White, 0.16% African American, 1.26% Native American, 1.10% Asian, 0.94% from other races, and 3.15% from two or more races. Hispanic or Latino of any race were 3.94% of the population.

There were 246 households, out of which 37.0% had children under the age of 18 living with them, 54.5% were married couples living together, 11.8% had a female householder with no husband present, and 30.1% were non-families. 27.2% of all households were made up of individuals, and 12.6% had someone living alone who was 65 years of age or older. The average household size was 2.58 and the average family size was 3.14.

In the town, the population was spread out, with 30.4% under the age of 18, 7.9% from 18 to 24, 24.1% from 25 to 44, 21.3% from 45 to 64, and 16.4% who were 65 years of age or older. The median age was 37 years. For every 100 females, there were 94.2 males. For every 100 females age 18 and over, there were 97.3 males.

The median income for a household in the town was $31,250, and the median income for a family was $37,045. Males had a median income of $31,875 versus $14,479 for females. The per capita income for the town was $12,584. About 7.1% of families and 8.3% of the population were below the poverty line, including 8.3% of those under age 18 and 16.5% of those age 65 or over.

== Education ==
Public education in the town of Shoshoni is provided by Fremont County School District #24. The district includes Shoshoni Elementary School (grades K-6) and Shoshoni Junior High / High School (grades 7–12).

== Transportation ==
Weekly intercity bus service to Cheyenne and Billings, MT is provided by Express Arrow.

The town has gained notoriety as a speed trap due to numerous references citing its aggressive enforcement of traffic laws. According to available data, the town has a 32% ticket to resident rate, suggesting a disproportionate number of traffic tickets issued to drivers passing through the area. This has led to criticism and controversy surrounding the town's policing practices.

== Notable person ==
- Isabel Jewell (1907–1972), actress on Broadway and in Hollywood, especially in the 1930s and early 1940s

== In popular culture ==
Marcus Sakey, in his Brilliance trilogy, lists Shoshoni as one of the three entrances (along with Gillette and Rawlins) to the New Canaan Holdfast, a large portion of Wyoming land owned by "abnorms".
