= C. H. King Company and First National Bank of Shoshoni =

- King, C. H., Company, and First National Bank of Shoshoni
- U.S. National Register of Historic Places
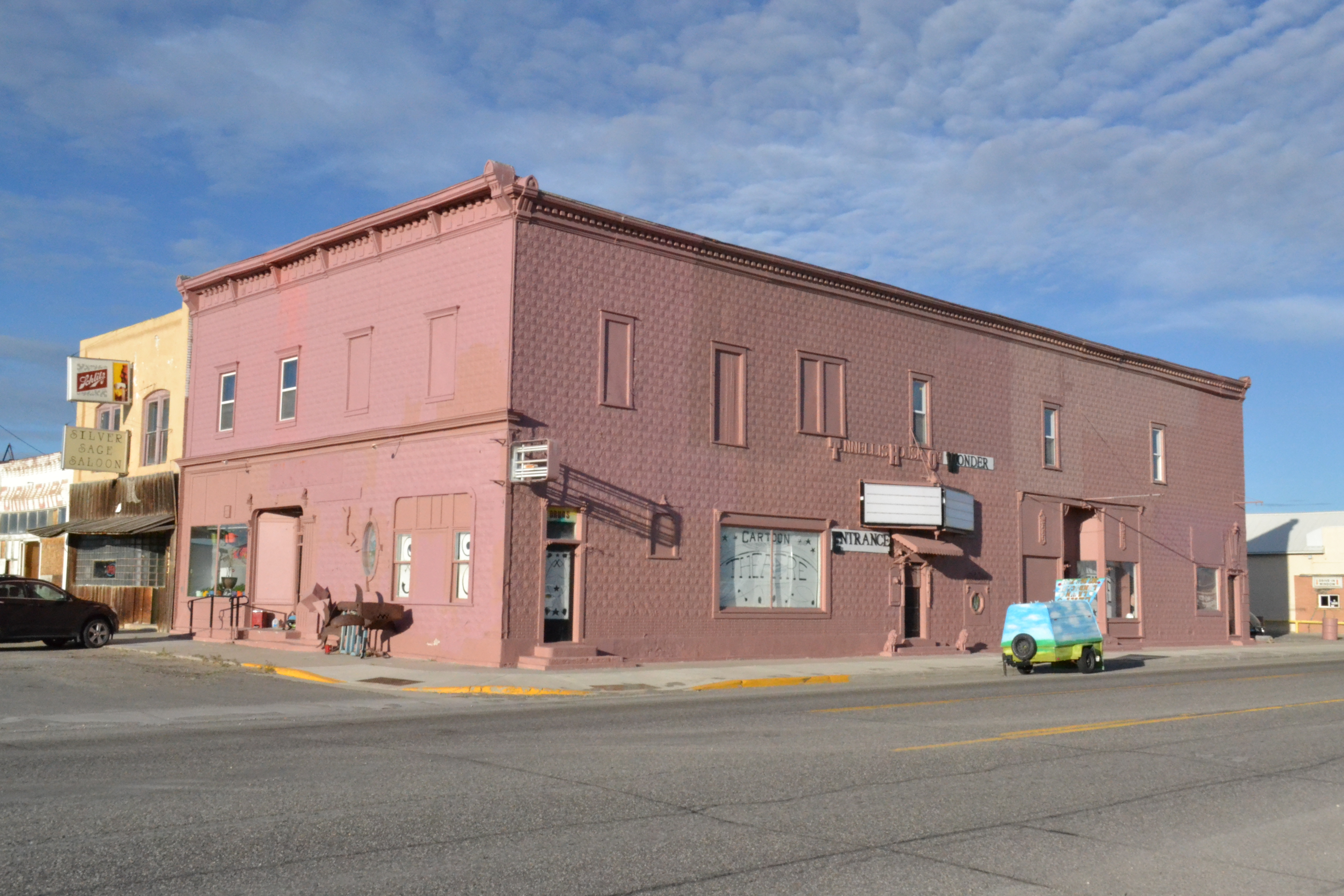
- Building in 2020

- Location within Wyoming Location within the United States
- Location: 127 Main Street, Shoshoni, Wyoming
- Coordinates: 43°14′07″N 108°06′29″W
- Area: 1 acre (0.40 ha)
- Architectural style: Twentieth-century vernacular
- NRHP reference No.: 94001135
- Added to NRHP: September 8, 1994

The C.H. King Company and First National Bank Building, also known as Yellowstone Drug, is one of the oldest buildings in Shoshoni, Wyoming. The building was built for Charles Henry King in 1905–1906. King was a central Wyoming businessman who established a lumber business in the building. King is otherwise notable as the biological grandfather of U.S. president Gerald R. Ford. The First National Bank of Shoshoni was also located in the building.

From 1919 a grocery store operated in the building. In 1937 a Masonic lodge, the Wind River Lodge #25 bought the building for back taxes and established their lodge hall upstairs. During the 1970s the building housed an antique store and a residence. In the late 1970s Yellowstone Drug moved into the building. The drugstore became a popular stopping point in central Wyoming. The store closed in 2012.

== Description ==
The two-story frame commercial building has two bays with entrances. The exterior is covered in metal panels pressed to simulate stone with pressed metal accessories and cornices. An oval stained glass window is to the left of the right-hand storefront. Four windows face the street in the upper story. Another storefront is midway on the side elevation. The building has a nearly flat roof sloping to the rear between parapets. On the interior, the partition between the main bays has been removed. The bank vault remains. A basement lies beneath the main level. The upper level is fitted out for meetings.

The building was placed on the National Register of Historic Places on September 8, 1994.
