= Boysen (surname) =

Boysen is a surname. Notable people with the surname include:

- Audun Boysen (1929–2000), Norwegian middle-distance runner
- Ben Lukas Boysen (born 1981), German musician
- Bill Boysen (1936–2020), American artist
- Bjørn Boysen (1943–2018), Norwegian organist and educator
- David Boysen (born 1991), Danish footballer
- George E. Boysen (1890–1967), American politician
- Gudrun Boysen (born 1939), Danish physician
- Hans-Jürgen Boysen (born 1957), German football player and manager
- Harold Koch Boysen (1891–1963), American World War I flying ace
- Harro Schulze-Boysen (1909–1942), German resistance fighter against the Nazi regime
- Karsten Boysen (born 1938), Venezuelan sailor
- Lia Boysen (born 1966), Swedish actress
- Libertas Schulze-Boysen (1913–1942), German resistance fighter against the Nazi regime
- Markus Boysen (born 1954), German actor
- Rasmus Boysen (born 1992), Danish retired handball player
- Rudolph Boysen (1895–1950), American horticulturist who created the boysenberry
- Sarah Boysen (born 1949), American psychology professor and primate researcher
