= KDNO =

- Thermopolis, Wyoming; United States
- Frequency: 101.7 MHz
- Branding: Country Legends 101.7

Programming
- Format: Classic country
- Affiliations: Fox News Radio; Compass Media Networks

Ownership
- Owner: Edwards Group Holdings, Inc., Employee Stock Ownership Trust; (Edwards Communications LC)
- Sister stations: KFCW, KTAK, KVOW, KWYW

History
- First air date: 2001
- Former call signs: KBIK (1999–1999)

Technical information
- Licensing authority: FCC
- Facility ID: 88672
- Class: C1
- ERP: 16,500 watts
- HAAT: 579.6 meters (1,902 ft)
- Transmitter coordinates: 43°26′18″N 107°59′37″W

Links
- Public license information: Public file; LMS
- Website: wrrnetwork.com/kdno

KDNO (101.7 FM) is a classic country radio station licensed to Thermopolis, Wyoming, United States. The station is owned by the Edwards Group Holdings, Inc., Employee Stock Ownership Trust, through licensee Edwards Communications, LC, and features programming from Fox News Radio and Compass Media Networks. The owner of Edwards Communications LC is also the owner of KFCW and KWYW. The call sign used to belong to what is now KDFO in Delano, California from 1970 to 1997. KDNO covers most of Hot Springs County and reaches most of Fremont County and can be heard in Lander and as far north as Worland. The station has kept the same format since its inception.

== History and facilities ==
The station was assigned the call sign KBIK on January 22, 1999. On September 9, 1999, the station changed its call sign to KDNO. KDNO was once a sister station of KTHE 1240 kHz also from Thermopolis.

The station shares its antenna with KWYW on Copper Mountain. In 2014, the station joined the Wind River Radio Network, after being purchased by Edwards Communications.

For a period of time in the spring and summer of 2014, KDNO and sister station KWYW were audible as far away as Sheridan, via a phenomenon known as knife edge diffraction, which allowed the signal to bounce over the Bighorn Mountains. The format was noted to be classic country.

In September 2023, the station, along with its sisters moved to a new studio on Main Street, co-located with the town's newspaper, The Riverton Ranger. Along with the move to the new studio, Edwards Communications also upgraded its other stations transmitters southeast of Riverton on Beaver Rim (KFCW, KTAK), and northeast on Copper Mountain (KWYW). AM sister KVOW received an upgrade as well. KVOW and KTAK were originally at 603 East Pershing Avenue in Riverton. The station is an affiliate of DayWeather Wyoming, originating out of Cheyenne.
