= Fremont County School District Number 24 =

School district in Wyoming, United States

Fremont County School District #24 is a public school district based in Shoshoni, Wyoming, United States.

== Geography ==
Fremont County School District #24 serves the northeastern portion of Fremont County, including the following communities:

- Incorporated places
  - Town of Shoshoni
- Unincorporated places
  - Lysite

== Schools ==
- Shoshoni High School (Grades 9–12)
- Shoshoni Junior High School (Grades 7–8)
- Shoshoni Elementary School (Grades PK-6)

== Student demographics ==
The following figures are as of October 1, 2009.

- Total District Enrollment: 294
- Student enrollment by gender
  - Male: 143 (48.64%)
  - Female: 151 (51.36%)
- Student enrollment by ethnicity
  - American Indian or Alaska Native: 4 (1.36%)
  - Hispanic or Latino: 20 (6.80%)
  - White: 270 (91.84%)

== See also ==
- List of school districts in Wyoming
