= Little Wind River (Wyoming) =

River in Fremont County, Wyoming, United States

- Location of mouth

Location
- Country: United States
- State: Wyoming
- County: Fremont

Physical characteristics
- Source
  - coordinates: 43.0102349°N 108.8817904°W
- Mouth
  - location: Big Wind River, Riverton, Wyoming
  - coordinates: 43°00′29″N 108°21′12″W

The Little Wind River is a river in Fremont County, Wyoming, United States. It rises in the central Wind River Range and flows southeast through the towns of Fort Washakie and Ethete to its confluence with the Big Wind River near Riverton.

== See also category ==
- List of rivers in Wyoming
