= KRAL =

Currently silent
- Rawlins, Wyoming; United States
- Frequency: 1240 kHz

Ownership
- Owner: Mt. Rushmore Broadcasting, Inc.
- Sister stations: KIQZ

History
- First air date: November 14, 1947
- Call sign meaning: Rawlins

Technical information
- Licensing authority: FCC
- Facility ID: 46736
- Class: C
- Power: 1,000 watts (unlimited)
- Transmitter coordinates: 41°46′50″N 107°15′53″W
- Translator: 98.9 K255DH (Rawlins)

Links
- Public license information: Public file; LMS

KRAL (1240 AM) is a radio station licensed to Rawlins, Wyoming, United States, that is currently silent. Over the years, the station has experienced periods of silence, while its sister FM counterpart remained on air for a short periods of time. The radio stations returned to broadcast status in January 2016 under Federal Communications Commission special temporary authority.

== History ==
KRAL started broadcasting in November 1947 with 250 watts, the then-limit of power for local channels. It was developed in the late 1940s under the supervision of William D. "Bill" McCraken, a Wyoming radio and television pioneer.

In 1954, KTHE in Thermopolis, Wyoming had a construction permit on 1240, the same frequency as KRAL. A hearing was held before the Federal Communications Commission regarding the two stations interfering with each other, despite being 137 miles (220 km) apart.

The station did apply for and was granted a renewal of its license in 2005, however citing technical reasons in July 2010, the station remained silent. The period in which KRAL had, until it fixed its "technical" problems and restored broadcasting expired July 19, 2011. According to FCC documents, the station resumed operations on June 20, 2012. Two days later, the station reported to the FCC that it would go silent due to staffing issues. The FCC approved this request, stating the station had to return to air by June 22, 2013. If the station did not return to air by that date and notified the FCC, the license would have been returned to the FCC. As of March 2013, KRAL still appeared in the FCC database and remained silent, along with its FM counterpart KIQZ. On June 6, 2013 KRAL returned to the air with a classic rock format and then went silent again two days later.

The station and its sister again requested an STA, or request to go silent in early 2015 as a result of employees "unexpectedly" resigning and the difficulty finding new employees at the remote location.

The station and its sister station KIQZ FM returned to air status in January 2016. The stations are broadcasting under Federal Communications Commission special temporary authority while transmission facilities are being reconstructed.

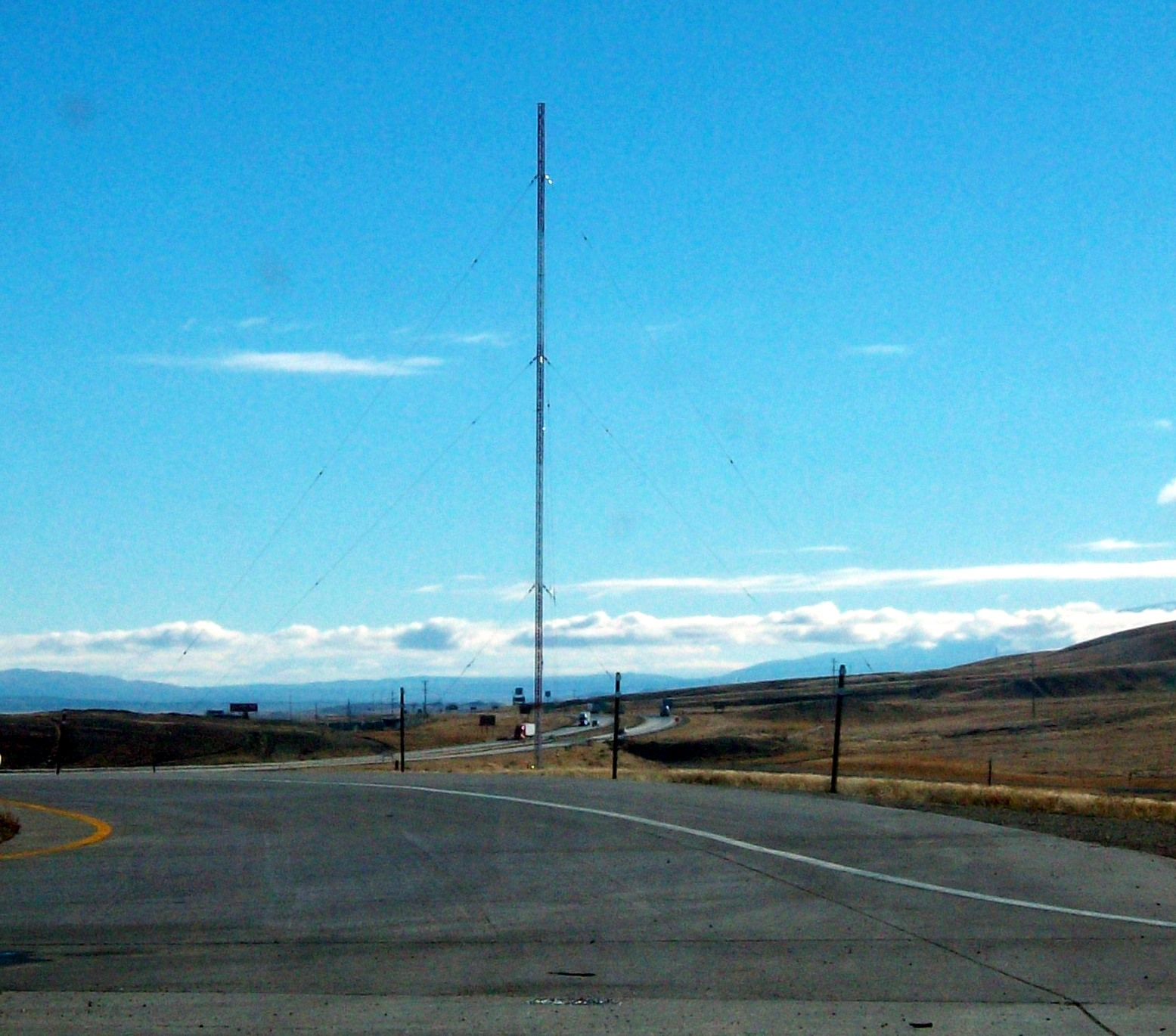
The former tower for KRAL, next to Interstate 80.

== Signal ==
KRAL's 1,000-watt signal covered western Carbon County and was very weak in Sweetwater County directly to the west. The station was barely audible to the north and east of Rawlins without a good radio or car stereo. KRAL's transmitter was located next to Interstate 80 on the western side of Rawlins. The station has been operating via a special temporary authority at 50 watts from a long wire near the studio.

== FCC fines and penalties ==
Since the station's change of ownership from "Elk Mountain Broadcasting" to current owner "Mount Rushmore Broadcasting", KRAL and its sister station, KIQZ (FM 92.7) have been fined by the FCC many times. Most recent penalties include a $20,000 fine for "failing to maintain the operational readiness of the EAS (Emergency Readiness System) equipment (see FCC Rules/11.35(a)), as well as other equipment issues and violations and failure to maintain a complete public records file."

Sources connected to the FCC say that more and significantly higher fines/penalties are forthcoming. They continue by stating that any station owned or operated by Mt. Rushmore Broadcasting will "not likely" have their licenses renewed once they expire, due to the history of "past violations and cavalier attitude(s) towards following and maintaining" rules and regulations, and that this and other Mt. Rushmore stations could have their broadcasting rights taken away "at almost any moment."
