= KIQZ =

Currently silent
- Rawlins, Wyoming; United States
- Frequency: 92.7 MHz
- Branding: Rawlins Radio

Ownership
- Owner: Mt. Rushmore Broadcasting, Inc.
- Sister stations: KRAL

History
- First air date: 1981
- Former call signs: KIAJ (1981)

Technical information
- Licensing authority: FCC
- Facility ID: 46737
- Class: A
- ERP: 1,200 watts (STA)
- HAAT: 91 meters (299 ft)
- Transmitter coordinates: 41°46′16″N 107°14′15″W

Links
- Public license information: Public file; LMS

KIQZ (92.7 FM) is a radio station licensed to Rawlins, Wyoming, United States, that is currently silent. The station is owned by Mt. Rushmore Broadcasting, Inc. It previously featured programing from AP Radio and Jones Radio Network. KIQZ was simulcasted on sister station KRAL also from Rawlins. KIQZ is currently broadcasting under special temporary authority.

== History ==
The station was first assigned the call sign KIAJ on August 13, 1981, and officially signed on with its current call sign, KIQZ, on November 4, 1981.

KIQZ has a documented history of operational failures and rule violations, particularly after the license renewal term began on October 1, 2005.

The station's history of non-compliance dates back to at least 1998, when a targeted inspection by the FCC's Denver District Office resulted in findings of Emergency Alert System (EAS) rule violations.

On April 10, 2008, an FCC inspection found that the EAS receive system for both KIQZ and KRAL was not operational, and agents could not locate the required quarterly radio issues/programs lists in the station's public inspection file for any quarter since October 2005. These findings resulted in a $20,000 fine (later reduced to $17,500).

In the late 2000s, the station experienced extended periods of silence, citing financial and staffing difficulties. The licensee filed for resumption of operations in 2011 and again in 2012, but the station quickly fell silent again due to issues such as employee resignations. In 2013, the station had to obtain Special Temporary Authority (STA) to go silent again, a common tactic used by the licensee to avoid automatic license forfeiture.

The station's long periods of silence and its owner's demonstrated inability to pay debts—a factor cited by the FCC when reducing a multi-hundred-thousand dollar fine to $25,000 in 2016—led to complications regarding its broadcast facilities. The resulting failure to pay various debts reportedly led to power being cut at the studio and transmitter site.

KIQZ remains under the ownership of Mt. Rushmore Broadcasting and has operated with intermittent service since 2013, often broadcasting under STA authority at reduced power or from temporary facilities while attempting to reconstruct its transmission facilities.

== FCC fines and penalties ==
Mt. Rushmore Broadcasting, Inc., and its president, Jan Charles Gray, have a significant history of willful and repeated violations of Federal Communications Commission (FCC) rules, with infractions confirmed by the agency dating back to at least 1998.

In December 2008, the FCC issued a Notice of Apparent Liability for Forfeiture (NAL) proposing a $20,000 fine against the company for violations at KRAL and KIQZ. The inspection found the licensee had failed to ensure the operational readiness of the Emergency Alert System (EAS) equipment at both stations and failed to maintain a complete public inspection file, with numerous quarterly radio issues/programs lists missing.

In September 2011, the FCC denied the licensee's petition for reconsideration and imposed a $17,500 monetary forfeiture for these violations. The agency also referenced that an earlier targeted EAS inspection of the stations in 1998 had also resulted in findings of rule violations by the licensee.

To resolve multiple outstanding enforcement actions with combined civil penalties of over $150,000, the FCC's Enforcement Bureau entered into a Consent Decree with Mt. Rushmore Broadcasting in May 2016.

The company, through its owner Jan Charles Gray, admitted that its operations violated Commission rules and agreed to pay a reduced $25,000 civil penalty.

The fine was substantially reduced from the original proposed penalty because the licensee provided a sworn statement demonstrating an inability to pay the full amount.

The violations addressed in the decree included failing to maintain a full-time management and staff presence at the main studio of two stations during business hours and failing to make stations available for inspection by an FCC agent. The remainder of the civil penalty was suspended, conditioned on the company's full compliance with a comprehensive new plan.
