= Bridger Trail =

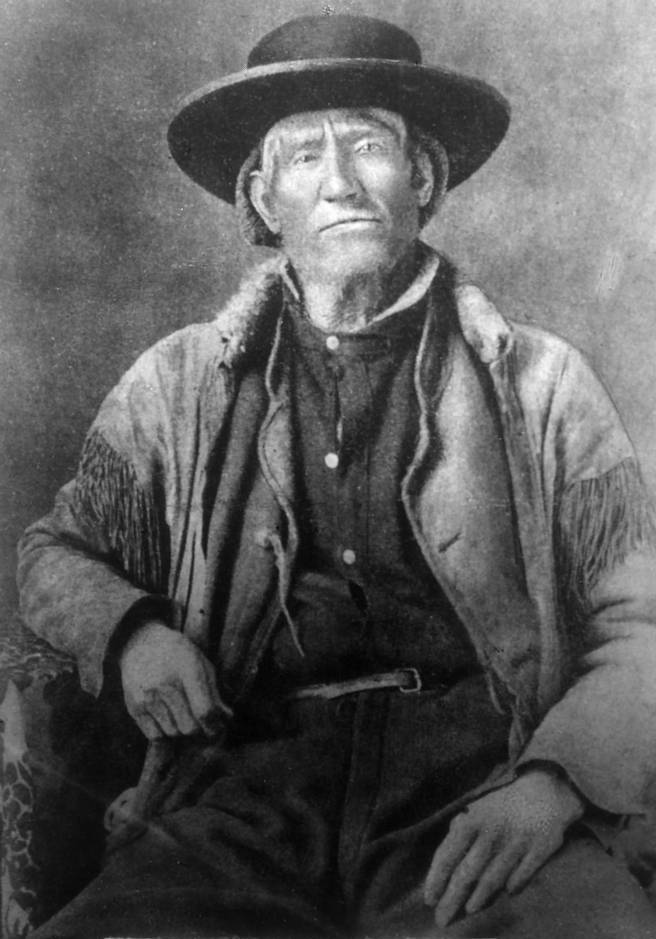
Jim Bridger (1804–1881).

The Bridger Trail, also known as the Bridger Road and Bridger Immigrant Road, was an overland route connecting the Oregon Trail to the gold fields of Montana. Gold was discovered in Virginia City, Montana in 1863, prompting settlers and prospectors to find a trail to travel from central Wyoming to Montana. In 1863, John Bozeman and John Jacobs scouted the Bozeman Trail, which was a direct route to the Montana gold fields through the Powder River Country. At the time the region was controlled by the Sioux, Cheyenne and Arapaho, who stepped up their raids in response to the stream of settlers along the trail.

In 1864 the commandant of Fort Laramie, Colonel William O. Collins, concerned about the hostilities along the Bozeman Trail, asked Jim Bridger to lead a party of settlers from Denver on a new route to the mines through the Big Horn Basin along the western edge of the Big Horn Mountains. In 1859, Bridger had guided a topographical expedition through the area, and knew the region well. The road ran approximately 425 miles (684 km), paralleling the Bozeman Trail and running to the west of the Bighorn Mountains in the lands of the Crow and Shoshone people. In all, 10 wagon trains made the trip in spring and summer of 1864, two of them guided personally by Bridger. The following year, hostilities along the Bozeman Trail had escalated to the point where Major General Grenville M. Dodge ordered Brigadier General Patrick E. Connor to lead the first Powder River Expedition to try to end the raids along the trail. Connor chose Bridger as one of his guides, and Bridger spent the next few years guiding various military excursions into the Powder River Country and never again led settlers along the Bridger Trail.

== Route ==
- Bridger Immigrant Road-Dry Creek Crossing
- U.S. National Register of Historic Places
- Nearest city: Cody, Wyoming
- Area: 5 acres (2.0 ha)
- Built: 1864
- NRHP reference No.: 75001900
- Added to NRHP: January 17, 1975

- Bridger Immigrant Road---Waltman Crossing
- U.S. National Register of Historic Places
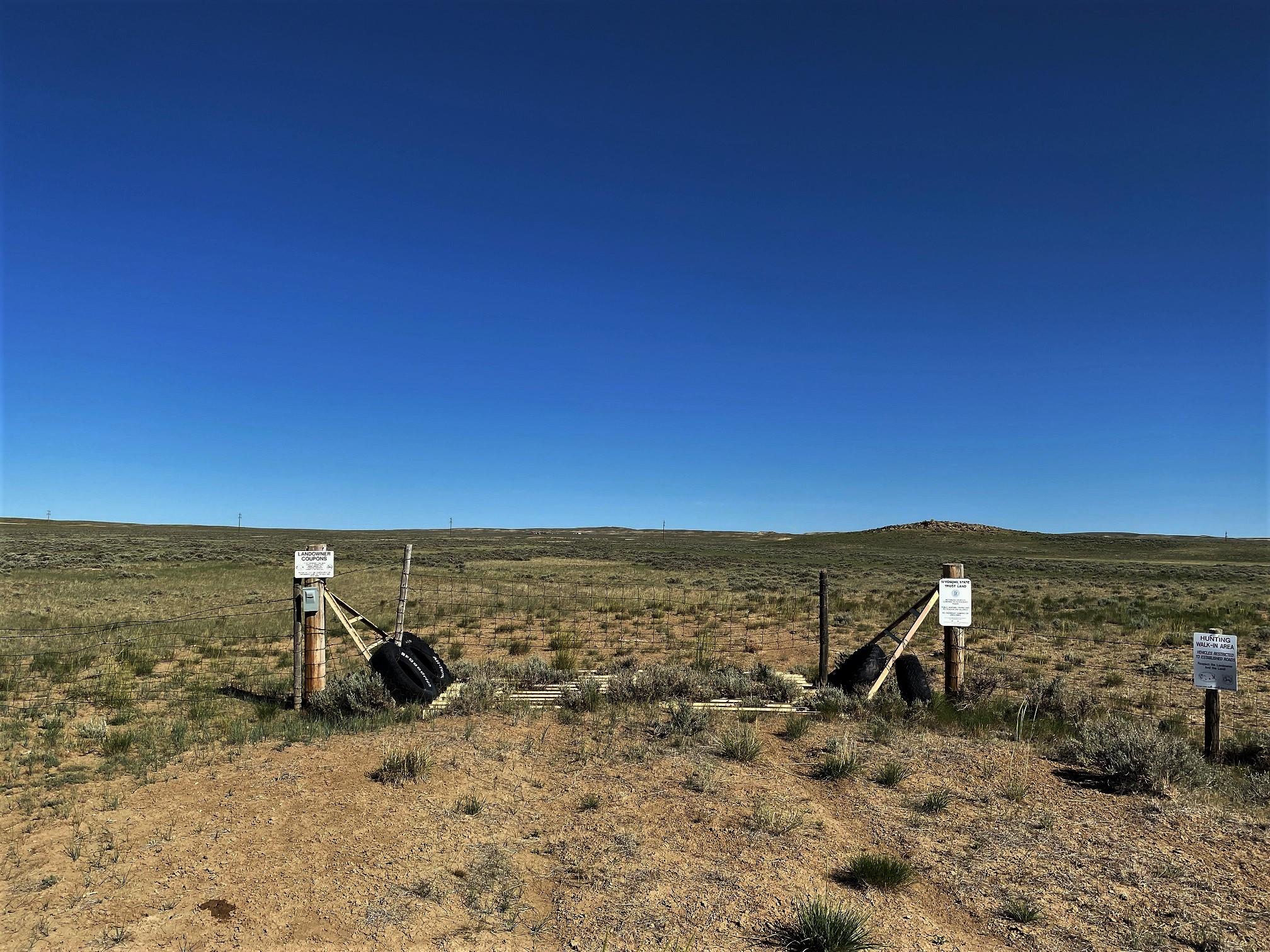
- Nearest city: Casper, Wyoming
- Area: 5 acres (2.0 ha)
- NRHP reference No.: 75001905
- Added to NRHP: January 17, 1975

The route left the Oregon Trail at Red Buttes, near Fort Caspar in central Wyoming, and headed in a northwestern direction. The trail crossed Badwater Creek near present-day Lysite, Wyoming, and followed Bridger Creek into the Bridger Mountains located just to the west of the southern end of the Bighorn Mountains. After cresting the range, the trail led down along the Kirby Creek drainage to where it meets the Bighorn River near the current town of Lucerne. From there, the trail turned north and follows the Bighorn River. At the mouth of the Nowood River the trail turned northeast and headed toward the Greybull River. After that crossing, the settlers forded the Shoshone River near Powell and continued north into Montana. After traveling through Bridger Canyon, the trail met the Clark's Fork Yellowstone River and followed it downstream past the present day town of Bridger, Montana, finally joining the Bozeman Trail at its confluence with Rock Creek, about 10 miles south of present-day Laurel, Montana. The two trails continued together west across Montana to the Virginia City gold mines. The trip could be made in as little as 34 days, though most of the wagon trains took some time to prospect the streams along the route.

As compared to the Bozeman Trail, the Bridger Trail was much less suited for wagon trains as grazing and water along the route were limited. However, in 1864, the trail is credited with handling 25% of the total growth in Virginia City's population. At least ten wagon trains used the trail in 1864, the largest being composed of 129 wagons and carrying some 350 to 450 people.

== Remnants ==
Few remnants of the trail remain today. Some visible tracks can be seen in Fremont County and Hot Springs, County. There are two sets of remaining carvings of settlers names: one on a sandstone cliff face near Bridger Creek, and the other at Signature Rock between Byron, Wyoming and Cowley, Wyoming. The trail was not well-defined in most places, but used a single well-defined path at stream crossings and other places where the terrain limits the choice of route, where the most distinct traces survive. Two portions of the Bridger Road are listed on the National Register of Historic Places. The Dry Creek crossing at 44°27′34″N 108°31′44″W is located in Big Horn County near U.S. Route 14/16/20 at Bridger Butte. The Waltman crossing at 43°4′20″N 107°12′41″W is in Natrona County where the Bridger Road crosses U.S. 20/U.S. Route 26 near Sand Draw and Waltman Draw. The sites encompass 5 acres (2.0 ha) each.

The Dry Creek Crossing and Waltman Crossing site were placed on the National Register of Historic Places on January 17, 1975.
