= Rasmus Boysen =

Danish handball player (born 1992)

Personal information
- Nationality: Danish
- Born: 14 October 1992 (age 34) Tønder, Denmark
- Height: 1.91 m (6 ft 3 in)

Sport
- Sport: Handball
- Position: Back court player

Senior clubs
- Years: Team
- –2005: Rindum SU
- 2005–2014: Skjern Håndbold
- 2014–2015: TM Tønder
- 2015–2019: Ribe-Esbjerg HH
- 2019–2020: Elverum Håndball
- 2020–2022: Fredericia HK

Rasmus Boysen (born 14 October 1992) is a Danish retired handball player and current handball commentator and influencer.

== Career ==
Boysen has appeared for the Danish youth national team, with whom he participated in the U21 World Championship in Bosnia in 2013. He has played 15 youth national matches for Denmark.

Rasmus Boysen has participated in the EHF Cup with Skjern Håndbold twice and once with Ribe-Esbjerg HH.

In the season - 2016/17 - Boysen secured his team Ribe-Esbjerg HH a spot in the playoffs for the first time in the history of the club, with a goal in the last second of the home game against local rivals SønderjyskE. They did however go on to lose both the semifinals and the bronze match.

In the 2019–20 season he played for Norwegian Elverum Håndball, where he won the Norwegian Championship. He also has participated in the EHF Champions League with Elverum HH. He returned a year later for familial reasons and in search of more playing time.

He retired in 2022 due to suffering a concussion during a match against Bjerringbro-Silkeborg Håndbold.

== Post-playing career ==
After his playing days he has acted as a handball influencer and journalist for the Danish TV channel TV2.
