= Owl Creek Mountains =

Subrange of the Rocky Mountains in Wyoming, United States

Coordinates: 43°27′N 108°45′W

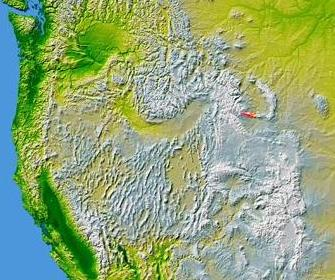
The Owl Creek Mountains in Wyoming are shown highlighted on a map of the western United States

The Owl Creek Mountains are a subrange of the Rocky Mountains in central Wyoming in the United States, running east to west to form a bridge between the Absaroka Range to the northwest and the Bridger Mountains to the east. The range forms the boundary between the Bighorn Basin to the north and the Wind River Basin to the south. The Wind River passes through the gap between the range and the Bridger Mountains to the east, and becomes the Bighorn River on the north side of the mountains. The high point of the range is 9,665 feet (2,946 m). The range is entirely within the Wind River Indian Reservation.

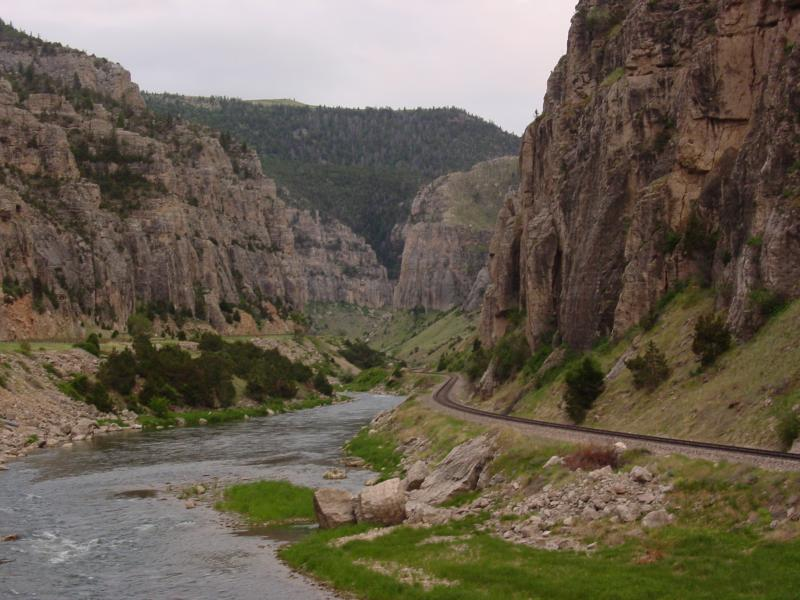
Wind River Canyon on the east side of the Owl Creek Mountains has been extensively studied by geologists

== Geology ==
During the Tertiary period, the rivers in the region removed much of the basin fill, exposing older bedrock. The rocks in the Owl Creek Range date from the Mississippian age through the Cretaceous period. The mountains likely emerged in the late Cretaceous, in the Laramide orogeny. In areas near the Boysen Fault, just north of Boysen Reservoir's dam at the southern mouth of Wind River Canyon, erosion has removed the upper part of the thrust of the mountain, exposing Cambrian and Ordovician rocks, overlaying Triassic age rocks.

Wind River Canyon has several markers along the main roadway through it, which indicate the time period the rocks are from.

Metavolcanic rocks of predominantly basaltic and dacitic composition have been found in the canyon.

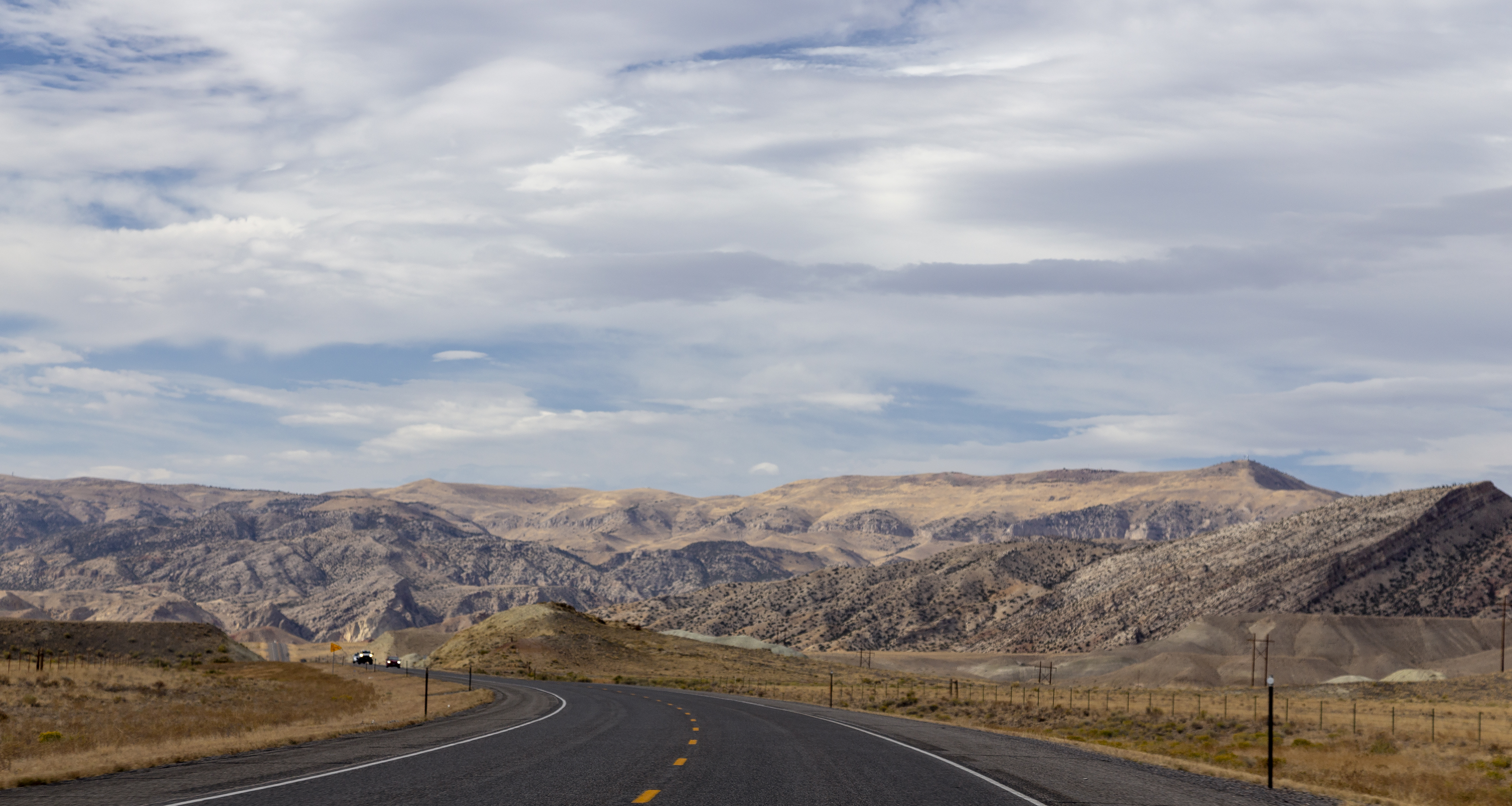
The Owl Creek Mountains from U.S. Route 20 at the south end of Wind River Canyon

== See also ==
- List of mountain ranges in Wyoming
