= KFCW =

- Riverton, Wyoming; United States
- Frequency: 93.1 MHz
- Branding: Wind River's Rock 93.1

Programming
- Format: Classic rock
- Affiliations: Fox News Radio; Compass Media Networks; Westwood One

Ownership
- Owner: Edwards Group Holdings, Inc., Employee Stock Ownership Trust; (Edwards Communications LC)
- Sister stations: KDNO, KTAK, KVOW, KWYW

History
- First air date: February 25, 1985
- Former call signs: KTRZ (1985–2014)

Technical information
- Licensing authority: FCC
- Facility ID: 72899
- Class: C1
- ERP: 100,000 watts
- HAAT: 269 meters (883 ft)
- Transmitter coordinates: 42°43′10″N 108°8′41″W
- Translator: 95.3 K237CP (Lander)

Links
- Public license information: Public file; LMS
- Website: www.wyotoday.com/kfcw/

KFCW (93.1 FM) is a radio station broadcasting classic rock. Licensed to Riverton, Wyoming, United States, the station is currently owned by the Edwards Group Holdings, Inc., Employee Stock Ownership Trust, through licensee Edwards Communications LC, and features programming from Westwood One's Classic Rock network, Fox News Radio, and Compass Media Networks. The station is an affiliate of the syndicated Pink Floyd program "Floydian Slip."

== History ==
KFCW began as KTRZ, with a construction permit issued on April 12, 1984. The construction permit was modified on August 30, 1984, and the station received a license to cover on February 25, 1985. Initially, the station was owned by Wind River Communications Incorporated. The station's sisters then were KWYW, and KDNO, and they remain the station's sisters at present.

KTRZ was an adult contemporary station, with the slogan "The Best Mix 93.1" with programming from the Jones Radio Network. At one point in the early 2000s, the station was known as Sunny 93.1.

KTRZ became KFCW on May 20, 2014. The station is now known as Wind River's Rock 93.1. In the fall of 2021, the station and its sister stations were operated under a time brokerage agreement by Radio Central, after the stations were donated by Jerry Edwards.

In September 2023, the station, along with its sisters moved to a new studio on Main Street, co-located with the town's newspaper, The Riverton Ranger. Along with the move to the new studio, Edwards Communications also upgraded its other stations transmitters southeast of Riverton on Beaver Rim (KTAK), and northeast on Copper Mountain (KDNO, KWYW). KVOW and KTAK were originally at 603 East Pershing Avenue in Riverton.

== Translators ==
In addition to the main station, KFCW is relayed by an additional translator to widen its broadcast area.

Call sign	Frequency	City of license	FID	ERP (W)	Class	FCC info
K237CP	95.3 FM	Lander, Wyoming	72900	76	D	LMS
