= KWYW =

- Lost Cabin, Wyoming; United States
- Broadcast area: Riverton-Lander, Wyoming
- Frequency: 99.1 MHz
- Branding: 99.1 The Heat

Programming
- Format: Adult contemporary
- Affiliations: AP Radio

Ownership
- Owner: Edwards Group Holdings, Inc., Employee Stock Ownership Trust; (Edwards Communications LC)
- Sister stations: KDNO, KFCW, KTAK, KVOW

History
- First air date: November 29, 1999
- Former call signs: KSXZ (1999–2001)

Technical information
- Licensing authority: FCC
- Facility ID: 89088
- Class: C
- ERP: 50,000 watts
- HAAT: 578 meters (1,896 ft)
- Transmitter coordinates: 43°26′18″N 107°59′37″W

Links
- Public license information: Public file; LMS
- Website: wyotoday.com/kwyw

KWYW (99.1 FM) is a radio station broadcasting an adult contemporary format. Licensed to Lost Cabin, Wyoming, United States, the station is currently owned by the Edwards Group Holdings, Inc., Employee Stock Ownership Trust, through licensee Edwards Communications LC, and features programming from AP Radio.

The station carries 1A and 2A Regional Basketball games from the area. It is an affiliate of the Denver Broncos.

== History ==
The station was assigned the call sign KSXZ on November 11, 1999. On July 5, 2001, the station changed its call sign to the current KWYW. In 2014 when the station became a part of the Wind River Radio Network, it changed formats to sports, carrying programming from ESPN.

For a period of time in the spring and summer of 2014, KWYW and sister station KDNO were audible as far away as Sheridan, via a phenomenon known as knife edge diffraction, which allowed the signal to bounce over the Bighorn Mountains. The format was noted to be ESPN Radio.

On July 7, 2017, KWYW changed its format from sports (ESPN) to adult contemporary, branded as "99.1 The Heat". (info taken from stationintel.com)

== Facilities ==
The station shares its antenna with KDNO on Copper Mountain. In September 2023, the station, along with its sisters moved to a new studio on Main Street, co-located with the town's newspaper, The Riverton Ranger. Along with the move to the new studio, Edwards Communications also upgraded its other stations transmitters southeast of Riverton on Beaver Rim (KFCW, KTAK), and northeast on Copper Mountain (KDNO). AM sister KVOW received an upgrade as well.

KVOW and KTAK were originally at 603 East Pershing Avenue in Riverton.
