= Boysen Dam =

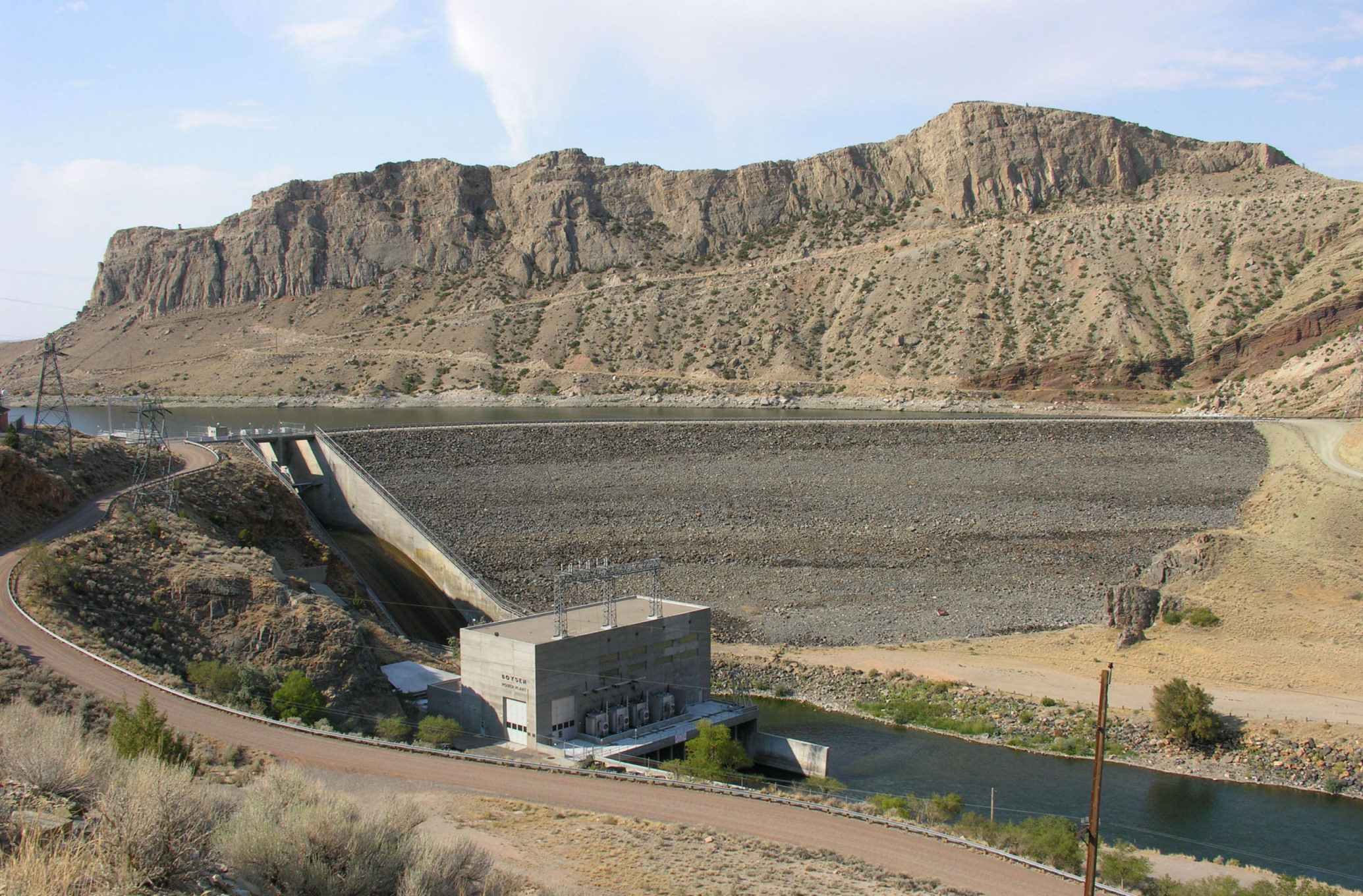
- Boysen Dam in 2012

- Location of Boysen Dam in the state of Wyoming.
- Country: United States
- Location: Fremont County, Wyoming
- Coordinates: 43°25′02″N 108°10′39″W
- Status: In use
- Construction began: 1947
- Opening date: 1952
- Construction cost: $18.5 million
- Owner: U.S. Bureau of Reclamation

Dam and spillways
- Type of dam: Rockfill
- Impounds: Wind River
- Height: 220 ft (67 m)
- Length: 1,143 ft (348 m)
- Elevation at crest: 4,758 ft (1,450 m)
- Width (crest): 30 ft (9.1 m)
- Width (base): 919 ft (280 m)
- Dam volume: 1,527,386 yd^{3} (1,167,770 m^{3})
- Spillways: 2
- Spillway type: Concrete chute and river outlets
- Spillway capacity: 26,300 cu ft/s (740 m^{3}/s)

Reservoir
- Creates: Boysen Reservoir
- Total capacity: 952,400 acre⋅ft (1,174,800 dam^{3})
- Active capacity: 802,000 acre⋅ft (989,000 dam^{3})
- Inactive capacity: 150,400 acre⋅ft (185,500 dam^{3})
- Catchment area: 7,700 mi^{2} (20,000 km^{2})
- Surface area: 19,560 acres (7,920 ha)
- Maximum water depth: 117 ft (36 m)
- Normal elevation: 4,732 ft (1,442 m) (max)

Power Station
- Turbines: 2
- Installed capacity: 15 MW
- Annual generation: 37,856,600 KWh

The Boysen Dam is a rockfill dam on the Wind River in the U.S. state of Wyoming. The dam lies at the head of Wind River Canyon through the Owl Creek Mountains in western Wyoming and creates Boysen Reservoir. It is owned by the U.S. Bureau of Reclamation and furnishes irrigation water supply to the Bighorn Basin as well as providing flood control and hydroelectric power.

== History ==
The first dam to be built at the Wind River Canyon site was actually in 1908, when Asmus Boysen supervised the construction of a small concrete run-of-the-river structure that generated 710 kilowatts of electricity. This early dam, located just downriver of the present Boysen Dam, silted up by 1925 and was removed in 1948. As early as 1904, the Bureau of Reclamation also made investigative forays into the area for the construction of a dam, although a final report was not completed until 1942. Initially, by a suggestion of the U.S. Army Corps of Engineers, the Boysen Dam would be built right over the site of the old dam, but the location was changed to about one and a half miles (2.4 km) upstream in order to reduce cost.

== Construction ==
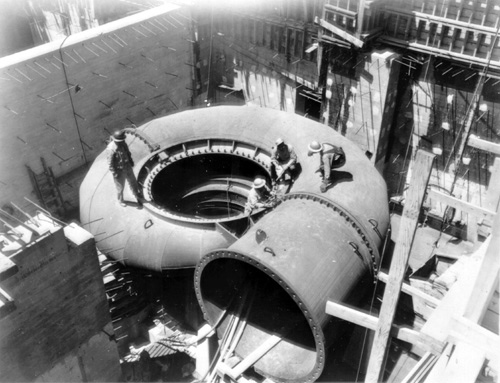
Hydroelectric turbine installation at Boysen Dam 1947-1951

Preliminary work for construction of Boysen Dam was begun on September 9, 1946 and included the installation of government buildings, an employee camp, warehouses, electrical transmission lines and the relocation of U.S. Highway 20 and the Chicago, Burlington and Quincy Railway to bypass the construction site. The contract for the dam itself and the rerouting of the rail line was awarded to the Morrison-Knudsen Company for $13.9 million. Most of the preparatory work including foundation excavations and the various camp facilities were completed by the end of autumn 1947, and official groundbreaking was on September 19 of that year.

In February 1948, excavation of the river diversion tunnel began and work continued on the relocation of the railway, which would run under the dam and portions of the future reservoir through a tunnel 7,131 feet (2,174 m) long. By March 1949, the diversion tunnel was successfully complete and the rail realignment mostly finished despite several minor setbacks including a rockslide and a fire that destroyed the concrete mixing plant. On December 23, 1949 a cofferdam across the Wind was finished and the river began flowing through the diversion tunnel, allowing work to proceed on the main section of the dam. As the embankment rose, the train tunnel was completed and opened on September 5, 1950 and work begun on the dam's power plant. Contracts for clearing the reservoir area were awarded beginning in September and came out to about $637,000.

Construction on the powerhouse continued through 1951 and equipment began coming into the dam site beginning in July of that year. The total cost of the generators and other apparatus came to $604,501. The embankment of the dam was completed a month later, and on October 11, 1951, the diversion tunnel was sealed and Boysen Reservoir began to rise. The powerhouse was finished in December 1951 and the entire dam was completed on February 16, 1952 at a cost of $18,576,405. The dam was declared operational on December 11, 1952.

== Structure and operations ==
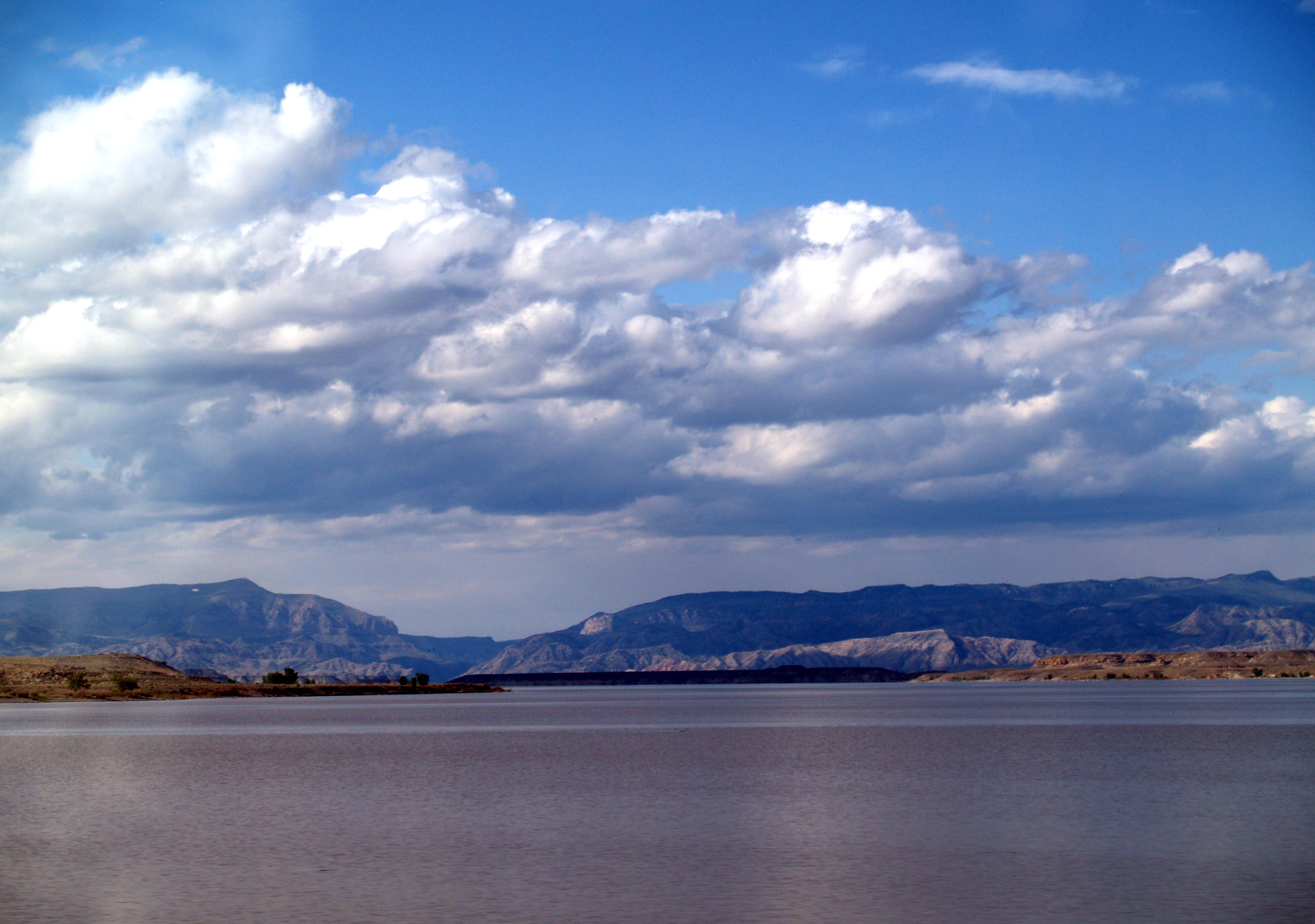
View of Boysen Reservoir

Boysen Dam is an earth and rock fill structure 220 feet (67 m) high from the foundations and 1,143 ft (348 m) long. The hydraulic head is only about 117 ft (36 m) because of the great depth to bedrock from the riverbed, thus necessitating a large amount of excavation for the dam foundations. The reservoir has a storage capacity of 952,400 acre-feet (1.1748 km^{3}), of which 520,679 acre⋅ft (0.642248 km^{3}) is reserved for annual flood storage and 144,229 acre⋅ft (0.177904 km^{3}) for agricultural and municipal uses. The dam provides electricity for regions of Wyoming ranging from Alcova to Thermopolis.

The dam also serves an important purpose of flood control, and has prevented about $75 million of damages from its completion to 1998. Its spillway is a concrete lined, over the crest structure controlled by two radial gates with a capacity of 25,000 cubic feet per second (710 m^{3}/s).

== Energy Generation Data ==
Boysen Dam Average Monthly Energy Generation (mwh) 1988-2020

Boysen Dam Total Yearly Energy Generation (mwh) 1988-2020

== See also ==
- Bighorn River
- List of reservoirs and dams in the United States
