= Wind River Canyon =

Canyon in Wyoming, United States

Coordinates: 43°31′13″N 108°10′50″W

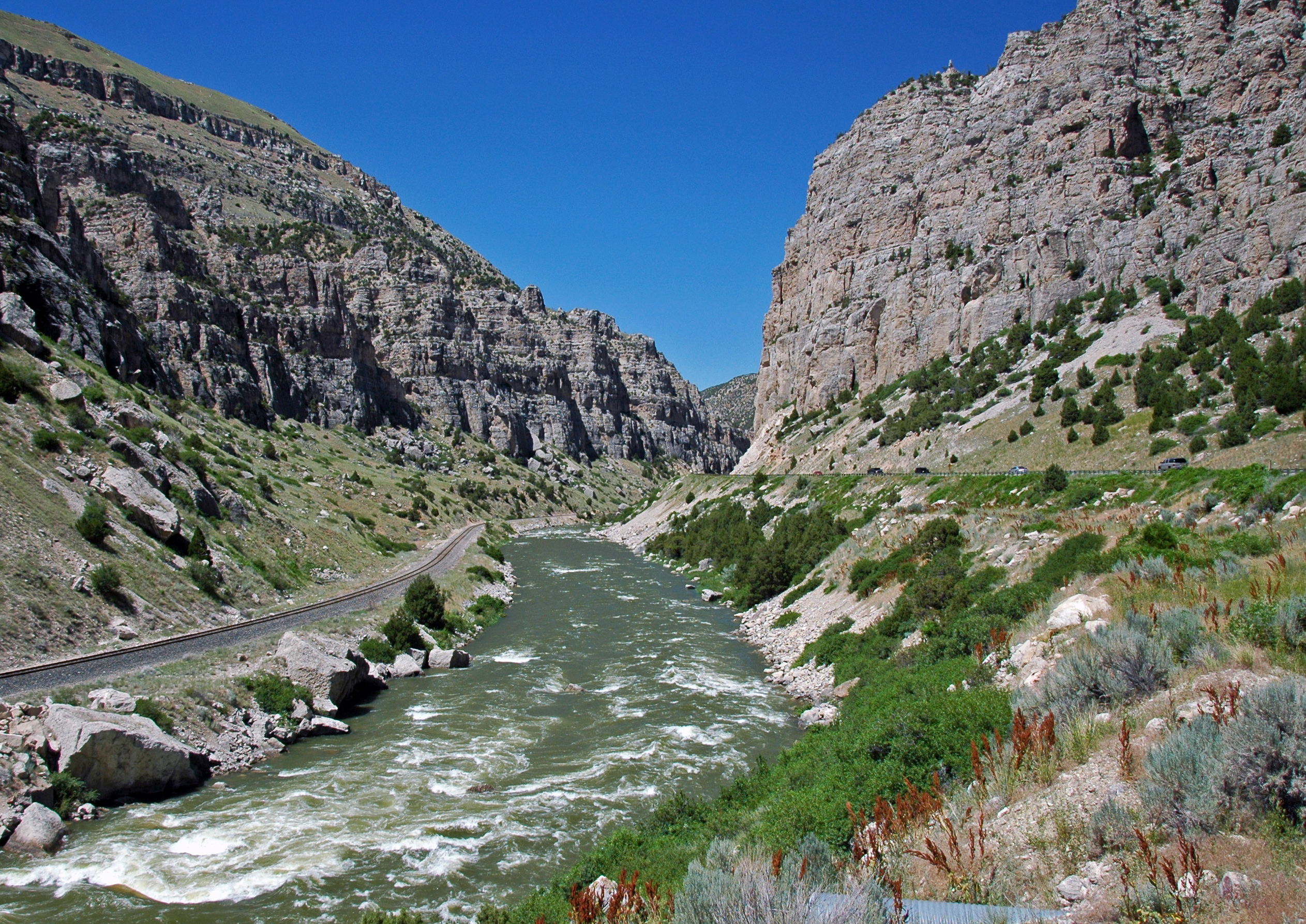
View of Wind River Canyon

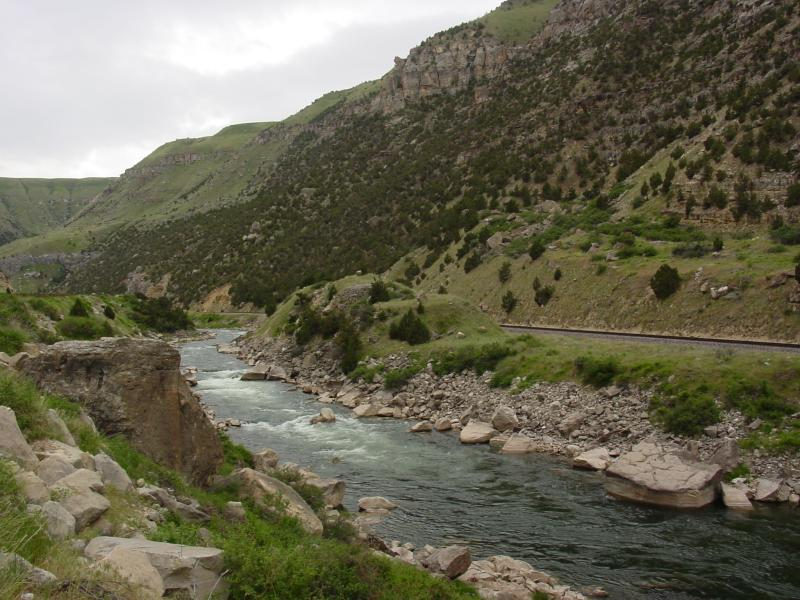
Wind River Canyon

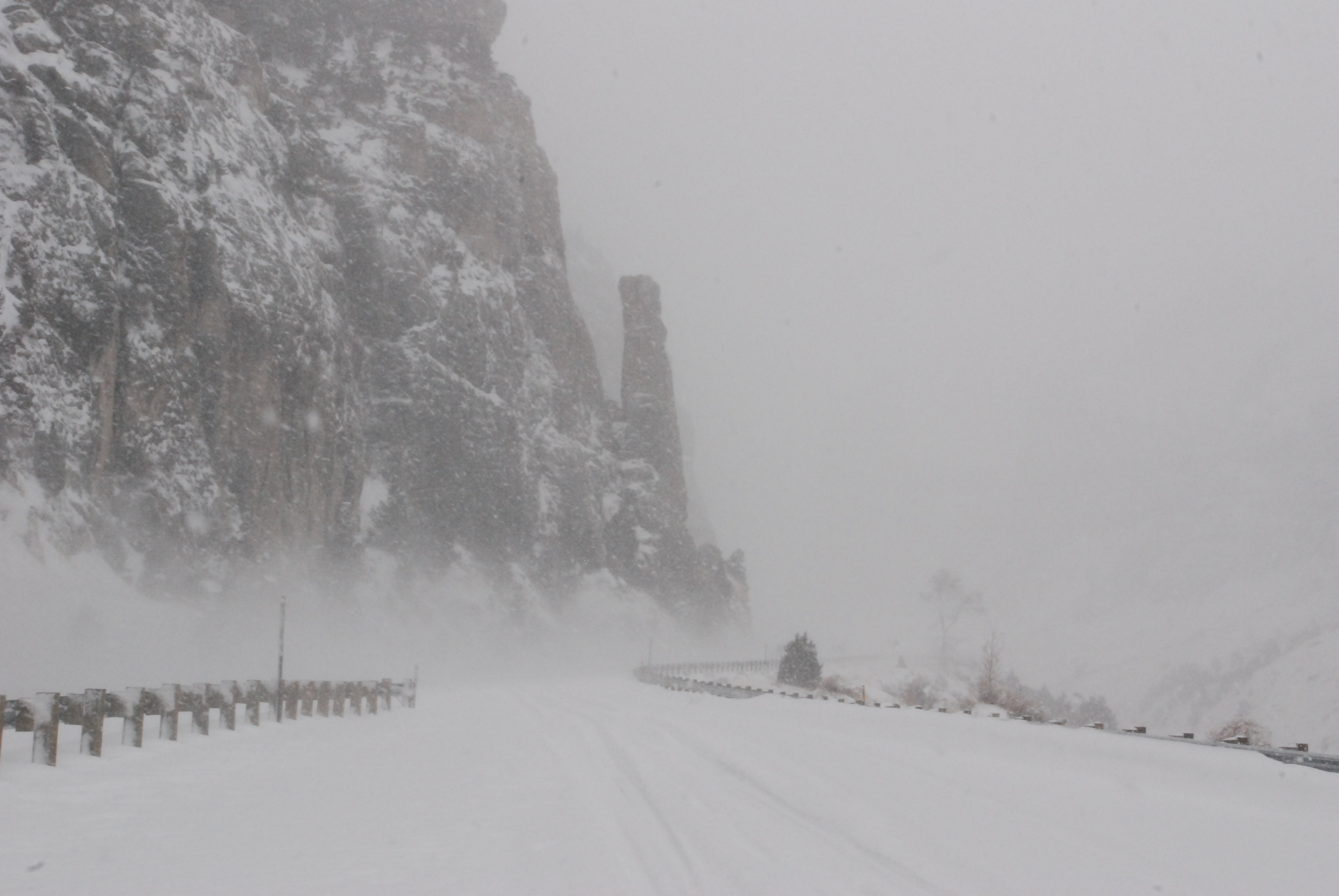
Wind River Canyon in January, 2008.

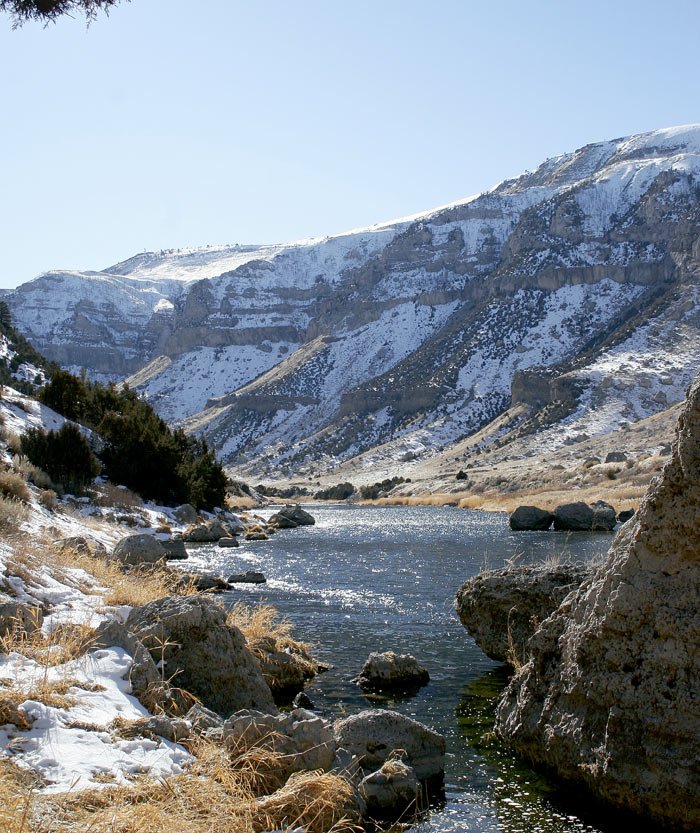
Wind River Canyon

Wind River Canyon is a canyon in Wyoming on the Wind River. It is located between the towns of Shoshoni and Thermopolis and is a popular stop for visitors to Yellowstone National Park. It is accessible by U.S. Highway 20 and Wyoming Highway 789. It was designated as a Wyoming Scenic Byway in 2005.

== Description ==
Work on U.S. 20/Wyo 789 through Wind River canyon began in 1922 and was finished in 1924, replacing the Bird's Eye Pass Route over the Owl Creek Mountains. U.S. 20/Wyo 789 travels through the canyon, at times level with the canyon floor. The scenic route offers views of the canyon and landmark natural structures like the Chimney Rock. The canyon is at times as much as 2,500 feet (760 m) feet deep. The change in elevation between the Bighorn Basin and the Wind River Basin is about 300 feet (91 m).

The southern mouth of the canyon is near the Boysen Dam in Boysen State Park several miles north of, and about half a mile east of, the state park's borders with the Wind River Indian Reservation. The canyon includes a number of homes along the highway and a Burlington Northern Santa Fe railroad line. The north end of the canyon is at the Wedding of the Waters, where the Wind becomes the Bighorn River. The Scenic Byway continues for several miles through Thermopolis and ends at T Hill on the north end of that town in Hot Springs State Park.

The Wind and Big Horn flow north out of Boysen Reservoir, through the canyon, into Thermopolis, and onward to points north.

== Geology ==
The canyon cuts through a comprehensive set of Wyoming rock strata exposures. Many of these are noted on roadside signs. The canyon was cut in the established course of the Wind River, which predates the uplift of the Owl Creek Mountains. The water gap was created as the topography of the mountains was raised over the past two million years from previously flat terrain. From south to north, the canyon crosses an area of complex faulting, then narrows as it descends into Precambrian rocks at three road tunnels. Beyond the tunnels, the strata dip, with high cliffs of sedimentary Madison Limestone, Bighorn Dolomite and sandstone. The northern end of the canyon cuts through red sandstone of the Chugwater Formation.
