= Boysen Reservoir =

Reservoir in Wyoming, United States

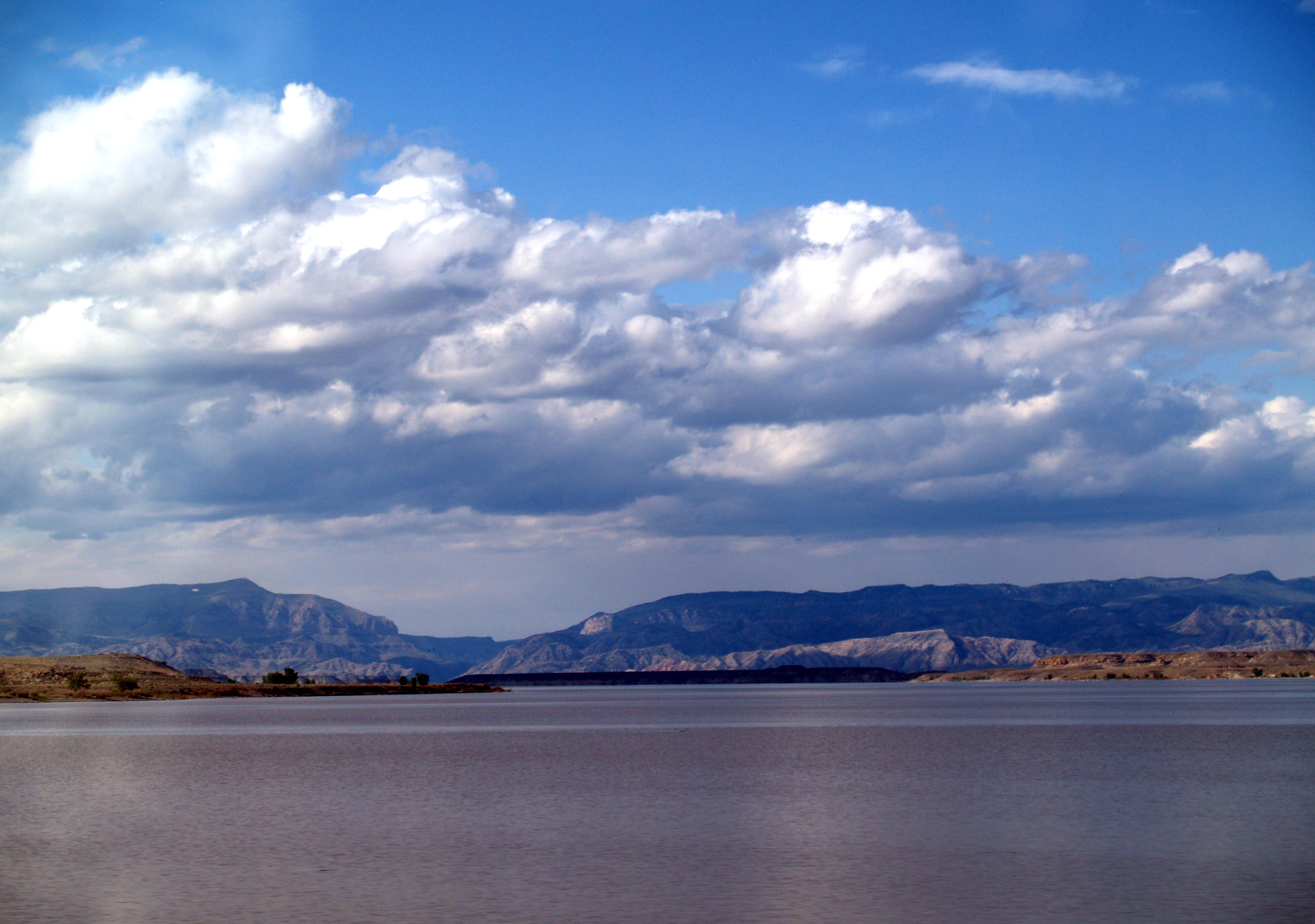
- Boysen Reservoir, 2009

- Location within Wyoming Location within the United States
- Location: Fremont County, Wyoming, United States
- Coordinates: 43°25′00″N 108°10′33″W
- Type: Reservoir
- Primary inflows: Wind River
- Primary outflows: Wind River
- Basin countries: United States
- Surface elevation: 4,800 ft (1,500 m)
- Settlements: Shoshoni

Boysen Reservoir is a reservoir formed by Boysen Dam, an earth-fill dam on the Wind River in the central part of the U.S. state of Wyoming. It is near the town of Shoshoni in Fremont County. The dam was constructed between 1947 and 1952 at the mouth of Wind River Canyon, just upstream from a previous dam that had been built by Asmus Boysen in 1908 on land he had leased from the Shoshone and Arapaho tribes. The dam and much of the reservoir are physically located on the Wind River Indian Reservation.

== Railroad tunnel ==
As a result of construction of the dam a major railroad track that connected Billings, Montana with Casper, Wyoming was flooded. A new track was laid, starting near the new dam where a 1 1/3 mile tunnel carried the tracks under the dam and around the edges of the reservoir.

== Boysen State Park ==
Surrounding the reservoir is Boysen State Park, run by the state of Wyoming. It includes 11 campgrounds spread around the reservoir and nearby area. The reservoir is a popular sporting area with numerous species of fish including walleye, perch, crappie, channel catfish, as well as rainbow and brown trout and several other species. Boysen Marina sits near the shore on the northeast side of the reservoir and has a bait shop and cafe and offers boat and jet ski rentals.

== Climate ==
Boysen Reservoir has a cold-semi arid climate with vast temperature differences throughout the year from summers averaging highs in the low 90s to winters averaging lows in the single digits.

Climate data for Boysen Dam, WY 1991–2020 normals, extremes 1940–present
Month	Jan	Feb	Mar	Apr	May	Jun	Jul	Aug	Sep	Oct	Nov	Dec	Year
Record high °F (°C)	62 (17)	69 (21)	77 (25)	88 (31)	95 (35)	103 (39)	105 (41)	104 (40)	102 (39)	89 (32)	71 (22)	63 (17)	105 (41)
Mean maximum °F (°C)	49 (9)	55 (13)	67 (19)	77 (25)	86 (30)	95 (35)	99 (37)	98 (37)	91 (33)	80 (27)	63 (17)	51 (11)	100 (38)
Mean daily maximum °F (°C)	29.6 (−1.3)	37.9 (3.3)	49.4 (9.7)	59.7 (15.4)	70.1 (21.2)	81.1 (27.3)	90.3 (32.4)	88.2 (31.2)	76.5 (24.7)	62.2 (16.8)	44.0 (6.7)	31.3 (−0.4)	60.0 (15.6)
Daily mean °F (°C)	17.9 (−7.8)	24.8 (−4.0)	36.4 (2.4)	46.6 (8.1)	56.7 (13.7)	67.1 (19.5)	75.3 (24.1)	73.2 (22.9)	62.4 (16.9)	48.9 (9.4)	33.8 (1.0)	21.1 (−6.1)	47.0 (8.3)
Mean daily minimum °F (°C)	6.4 (−14.2)	12.9 (−10.6)	23.8 (−4.6)	33.8 (1.0)	43.6 (6.4)	52.8 (11.6)	60.1 (15.6)	58.3 (14.6)	47.7 (8.7)	36.3 (2.4)	23.1 (−4.9)	10.8 (−11.8)	34.1 (1.2)
Mean minimum °F (°C)	−13 (−25)	−8 (−22)	5 (−15)	19 (−7)	31 (−1)	41 (5)	51 (11)	49 (9)	35 (2)	23 (−5)	6 (−14)	−9 (−23)	−18 (−28)
Record low °F (°C)	−39 (−39)	−36 (−38)	−21 (−29)	2 (−17)	20 (−7)	27 (−3)	41 (5)	38 (3)	16 (−9)	−3 (−19)	−15 (−26)	−36 (−38)	−39 (−39)
Average precipitation inches (mm)	0.25 (6.4)	0.28 (7.1)	0.56 (14)	1.28 (33)	1.82 (46)	1.34 (34)	0.72 (18)	0.51 (13)	0.79 (20)	0.80 (20)	0.33 (8.4)	0.28 (7.1)	8.96 (227)
Average snowfall inches (cm)	1.7 (4.3)	2.1 (5.3)	3.1 (7.9)	1.0 (2.5)	0.0 (0.0)	0.0 (0.0)	0.0 (0.0)	0.0 (0.0)	0.0 (0.0)	0.3 (0.76)	1.5 (3.8)	1.9 (4.8)	11.6 (29.36)
Source: WRCC

== See also ==
- List of largest reservoirs of Wyoming
