= Wind River (Wyoming) =

River in Wyoming, United States

Wind River Wild River, Bighorn River
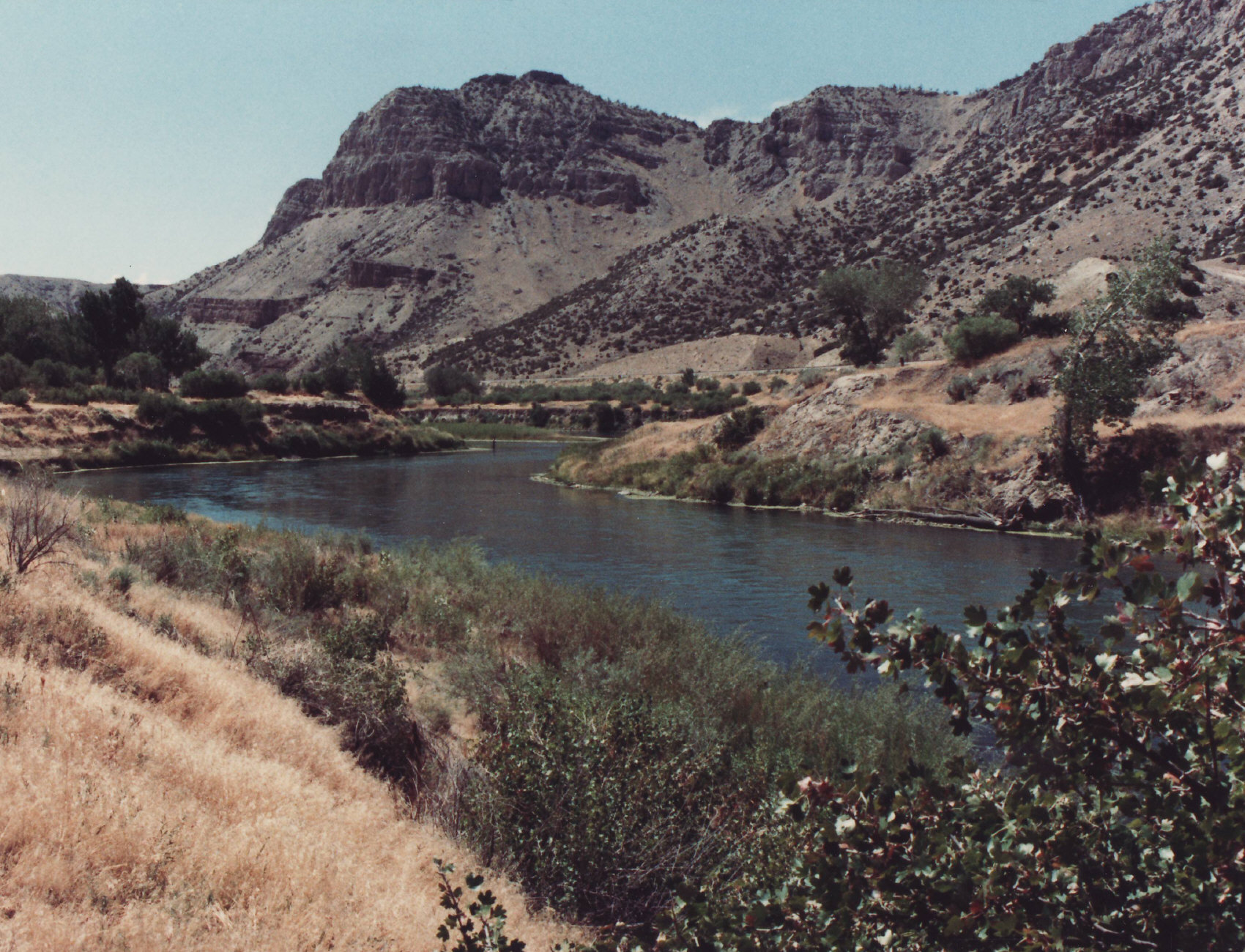
- Wind River Canyon downstream from Boysen Dam

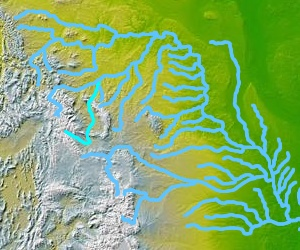
- The Wind-Bighorn rivers
- Native name: Heteiniicie (Arapaho)

Location
- Country: United States
- State: Wyoming
- Cities: Dubois, Crowheart, Johnstown, Riverton

Physical characteristics
- Source: Two Ocean Mountain
  - location: Wind River Range, Teton County
  - coordinates: 43°44′50″N 110°04′27″W
  - elevation: 9,760 ft (2,970 m)
- Mouth: Bighorn River
  - location: Wedding of the Waters, Hot Springs County
  - coordinates: 43°34′52″N 108°12′44″W
  - elevation: 4,472 ft (1,363 m)
- Length: 185 mi (298 km)
- Basin size: 7,730 sq mi (20,000 km^{2})
- Discharge
  - location: below Boysen Dam
  - average: 1,357 cu ft/s (38.4 m^{3}/s)
  - minimum: 4.7 cu ft/s (0.13 m^{3}/s)
  - maximum: 28,700 cu ft/s (810 m^{3}/s)

Basin features
- Tributaries
  - left: East Fork Wind River
  - right: Dinwoody Creek, Bull Lake Creek, Little Wind River

The Wind River is the name applied to the upper reaches of the Bighorn River in Wyoming in the United States. The Wind River is 185 miles (298 km) long. The two rivers are sometimes referred to as the Wind/Bighorn.

== Course ==
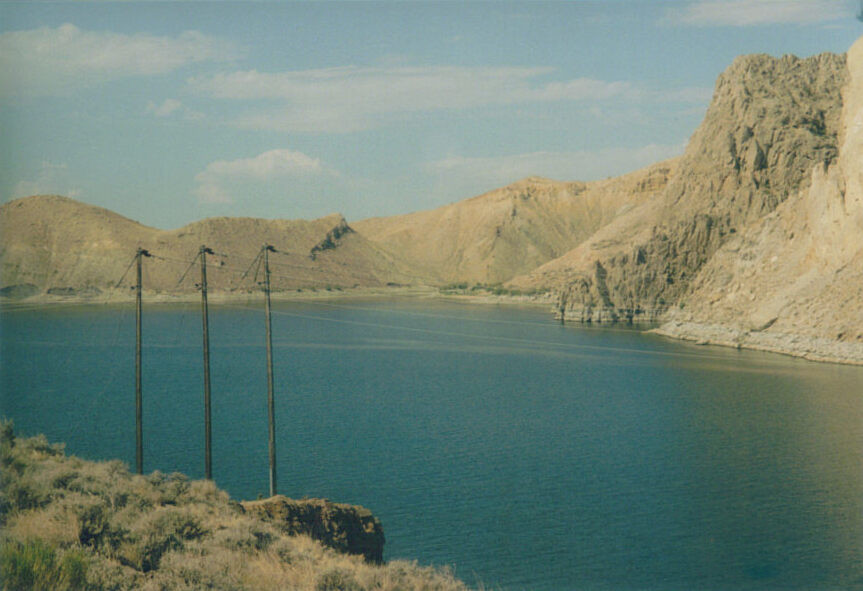
Wind River as part of the Boysen Reservoir near Thermopolis, Wyoming

Its headwaters are at Wind River Lake in the Rocky Mountains, near the summit of Togwotee Pass (pronounced TOH-guh-tee) and gathers water from several forks along the northeast side of the Wind River Range in west central Wyoming. It flows southeastward, across the Wind River Basin and the Wind River Indian Reservation and joins the Little Wind River near Riverton. Up stream from this confluence, it is known locally as the Big Wind River. It flows northward, through a gap in the Owl Creek Mountains, where the name of the river becomes the Bighorn River. In the Owl Creek Mountains, it is dammed to form Boysen Reservoir. The Wind River officially becomes the Bighorn River at the Wedding of the Waters, on the north side of the Wind River Canyon.

== See also ==
- List of rivers of Wyoming
- List of tributaries of the Missouri River
