= Pine Grove Station Site =

- U.S. National Register of Historic Places
- Nearest city: Rawlins, Wyoming
- Area: less than one acre
- Built: 1862
- NRHP reference No.: 78002820 (original); 100006112 (increase)

Significant dates
- Added to NRHP: November 21, 1978
- Boundary increase: February 8, 2021

The Pine Grove Station Site is a former way station on the Overland Trail in Carbon County, Wyoming, near Bridger's Pass. It was built in 1862 by Robert Foote for $1500 and was described as a log building about 25 feet (7.6 m) by 60 feet (18 m) with an adjoining corral. The station was burned in 1865 and 1867 by Indians. Nothing remains of the station. The site was placed on the National Register of Historic Places on December 6, 1978.

== See also ==
- Sage Creek Station Site stop before Pine Grove Station
- Sulphur Springs Station Site stop after Pine Grove Station
