= Requiem (statue) =

Statue in Rock Springs, Wyoming

Coordinates: 41°35′28″N 109°13′14″W

- Artist: David Alan Clark
- Year: 2025
- Medium: bronze
- Location: Rock Springs, Wyoming

Requiem is the name of a statue in Rock Springs, Wyoming commemorating the victims of the Rock Springs Chinese Massacre of 1885. The statue was erected in 2025 and was created by artist David Alan Clark.

The more than 7 foot tall bronze statue depicts a Chinese miner holding pieces of a tattered dragon flag while standing on the ruins of the burned Chinatown. Nearly 200 people, including descendants of the victims, attended the unveiling ceremony on September 1, 2025 which marked the 140th anniversary of the massacre. The statue supplements an existing plaque commemorating the 42 victims of the massacre.

The statue is located on the corner of Bridger Avenue and Tisdel Street in Rock Springs near the archaeological site of the burned down Chinatown.
