= Fort Halleck (Wyoming) =

- U.S. National Register of Historic Places
- Location within Wyoming Location within the United States
- Nearest city: Elk Mountain, Wyoming
- Coordinates: 41°41′53″N 106°30′55″W
- Area: 14.7 acres (5.9 ha)
- Built: 1862
- NRHP reference No.: 70000668
- Added to NRHP: April 28, 1970

Fort Halleck was a military outpost that existed in the 1860s along the Overland Trail and stage route in what was then the Territory of Idaho, now the U.S. state of Wyoming. The fort was established in 1862 to protect emigrant travelers and stages transporting mail between Kansas and Salt Lake City, Utah, and named for Major General Henry Wager Halleck, commander of the Department of the Missouri and later General-in-chief of the Union armies.

The fort was located on the northeast side of Elk Mountain at an altitude of about 7800 feet. At the time, the area around the fort was well watered and well stocked with game. The fort was reasonably large with stables for 200 horses, company quarters, office quarters, and a hospital and surgeons on staff.

== History ==
The Overland Trail was established in 1860 following the same general path as the Cherokee Trail which was in use in the late 1840s by miners heading to California. In 1861 the government moved the official mail route, at the request of Ben Holladay, to the Overland Trail from the Oregon Trail due to threat of Indian attack and the mail contract was assigned to Ben Holladay who established a stage line and stage stations along the Overland Trail. Pressure by white immigrants and shifting buffalo herds forced the Indian tribes to the Laramie Plains where they came into conflict with travelers on the Overland. Soldiers from the Eleventh Ohio Volunteer Cavalry stationed in Camp Collins in Colorado were dispatched north to build Fort Halleck to protect the trail from Camp Collins to the Green River stage station in the west.

The trail was at its busiest in 1864 and 1865. During this time, troops were often used as escorts and drivers for the stages. At times in 1864 and 1865 ongoing attacks caused the mail to accumulate at stations in Colorado and at Fort Halleck until it could be transported to Green River via government wagons.

The fort was abandoned in 1866 after Fort Sanders was built near the present day city of Laramie. Three years later the Transcontinental railroad was completed (mostly along the same route as the Overland Trail from Laramie to Salt Lake City) and travel on the trail declined to nearly nothing.

The outlaw L. H. Musgrove was charged in 1863 with murder at Fort Halleck and taken to Denver, Colorado, where he was lynched in 1868 by a vigilante committee.

Today, the site is located on private land. Only a single building (thought to be the blacksmith shop) remains standing. A marker is located on the cemetery.

== See also ==
- Pass Creek Stage Station next stop on the Overland Trail
- List of the oldest buildings in Wyoming
- Carbon County, Wyoming monuments and markers
- Elk Mountain Station
