= Overland Trail =

Trail in the American West

Route Overview
- Alternate name: Overland Stage Line
- Country: United States
- Active period: 1862–1869 (heavily utilized)
- Key operators: Overland Stage Company / Wells Fargo
- East terminus: Atchison, Kansas
- West terminus: Fort Bridger, Wyoming
- Major junctions: Laramie, Wyoming; Julesburg, Colorado; Denver
- Approximate length: 575 mi (925 km)

American Frontier History
- Corporate history: Central Overland California and Pike's Peak Express Company (1859–1862); Overland Stage Company (1862–1866); Wells Fargo (1866–1869)
- Frontier conflicts: Battle of Julesburg (1865); Plains Indian Raids (1864–1865); Destruction of Virginia Dale line stations
- Geopolitical impact: Rerouted south to bypass historic northern uprisings; Heightened regional tensions leading to the Sand Creek massacre; Rendered obsolete by the First transcontinental railroad

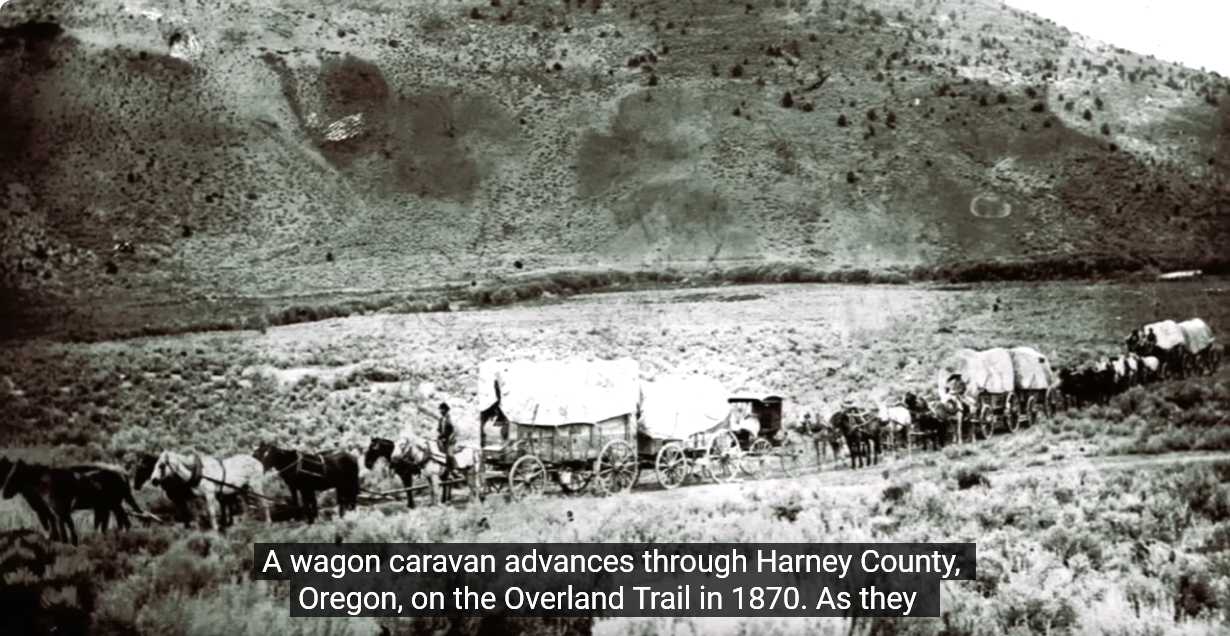
Overland Trail at Harney County, Oregon - 1870

The Overland Trail (also known as the Overland Stage Line) was a stagecoach and wagon trail in the American West during the 19th century. While portions of the route had been used by explorers and trappers since the 1820s, the Overland Trail was most heavily used in the 1860s as a route alternative to the Oregon, California, and Mormon trails through central Wyoming. The Overland Trail was famously used by the Overland Stage Company owned by Ben Holladay to run mail and passengers to Salt Lake City, Utah, via stagecoaches in the early 1860s. Starting from Atchison, Kansas, the trail descended into Colorado before looping back up to southern Wyoming and rejoining the Oregon Trail at Fort Bridger. The stage line operated until 1869 when the completion of the First transcontinental railroad eliminated the need for mail service via stagecoach.

== History ==
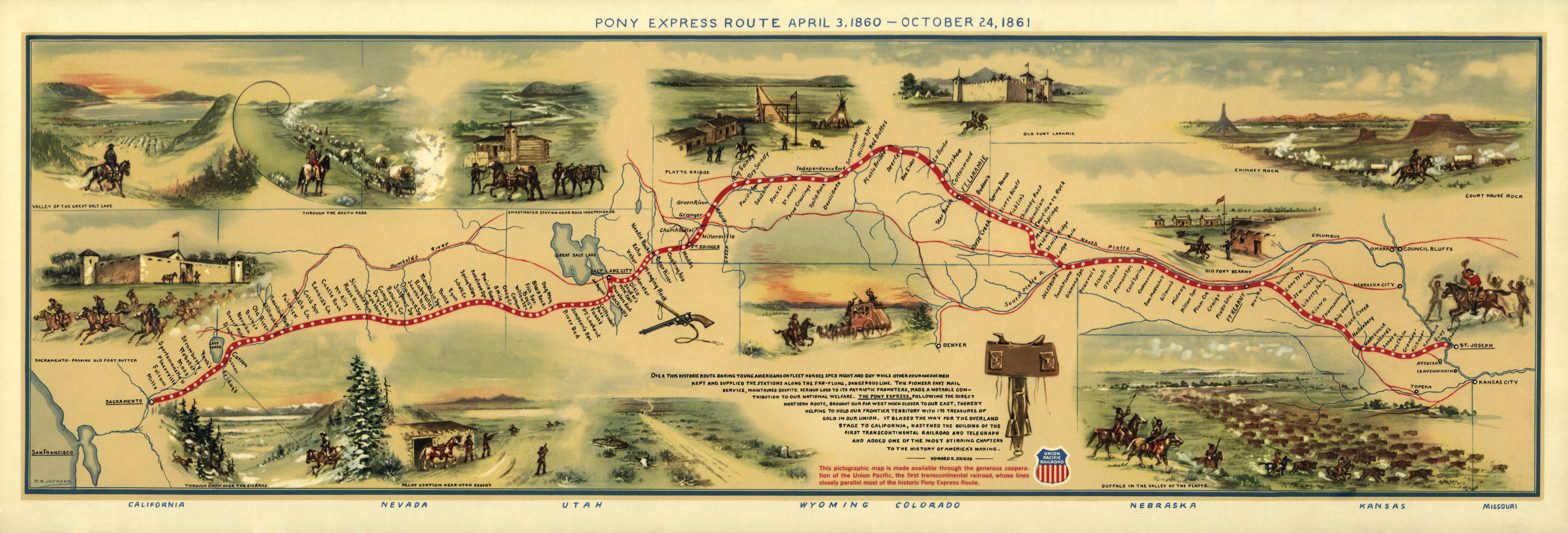
Map of the 1860 Pony Express Route by William Henry Jackson. The Pony Express helped define the Overland Trail.

In 1850, U.S. Army Corps of Topographical Engineers Captain Howard Stansbury's expedition was returning east. At Fort Bridger, Jim Bridger advised Stansbury of a shorter route than the Oregon Trail. According to Erb, Brown and Hughes, "From the Green River this trail went eastward along Bitter Creek, skirting the Red Desert to Muddy Creek, following the Muddy Canyon to Bridger's Pass where the Continental Divide was crossed, then down Sage Creek crossing the North Platte River and dropping down onto the Laramie Plains." General William Henry Ashley had crossed the Laramie Plains in 1825, and John C. Fremont had explored the area near Bridger Pass in 1842, while natives had used this and other trails for years, including the Cherokee Trail as recently as 1849. In 1858, Lieutenant F.T. Bryan made his third expedition over the Bridger Pass route, when a topographical party with engineers determined a roadway that included built bridges, and filled-in gullies.

From 1859, the Leavenworth and Pike's Peak Express operated mail stages from Missouri along the South Pass Oregon-California trail. The Chorpenning contract was annulled in 1860 and was subsequently awarded to the Central Overland California and Pikes Peak Express Company (C.O.C and P.P Express), which ran stage lines between Missouri and Utah along the Oregon Trail. In 1860, the C.O.C and P.P Express started the Pony Express, which followed the Oregon and Mormon Trails to Salt Lake City and the Central Nevada Route to Sacramento. The Pony Express only lasted a year before the C.O.C and P.P Express went bankrupt and the assets were sold to Ben Holladay. In 1861, Holladay was awarded the Postal Department contract for overland mail service between the end of the western terminus of the railroad in Missouri and Kansas and Salt Lake City. Service from Utah to California was given to the Overland Mail Company and other stage lines. Holladay initially operated along the original South Pass route, but changed the route further south to the Bridger Pass route after Shoshone attacks. This more southerly route would also allow connecting routes to Denver. In 1862, the new route was reconnoitered, and on 21 July 1862, mail coaches began using it.

According to Erb, Brown and Hughes, "Stations were located approximately every 10 to 15 miles apart and stocked with the finest horses, mules, tack and coaches. The larger places, called Home Stations, located approximately every 50 miles, where the driver's route ended, were built to accommodate travelers with meals and overnight lodging, and had a telegraph station. The smaller, or swing stations, built on one-quarter to one-half acre plots, just provided fresh teams for the coaches."

Holladay retained the mail contract on the route until 1866, when it was sold to Wells Fargo. Stage operations continued until 1869, when the completion of the Transcontinental Railroad made stage service unnecessary.

Over time, increasing emigrant traffic and homesteading in the plains and shifting buffalo herds forced Native American tribes into southern Wyoming and northern Colorado, leading to conflicts on the Overland Trail, especially in the eastern portion along the South Platte River and in the western portion along the Laramie Plains. Attempts to force the Native Americans onto a reservation came to a head during the Colorado War in 1864. Camp Collins, near present-day Fort Collins, Colorado, and Fort Sanders and Fort Halleck in Wyoming were established to protect travelers against Sioux raids on the trail during the 1860s. Stagecoach stations and ranches along 150 miles (240 km) of the South Platte River were burned down by an army of Cheyenne, Arapaho, and Sioux in January and early February 1865 as part of a campaign of reprisals after the United States Army committed the Sand Creek Massacre. (See Battle of Julesburg.)

== Route ==
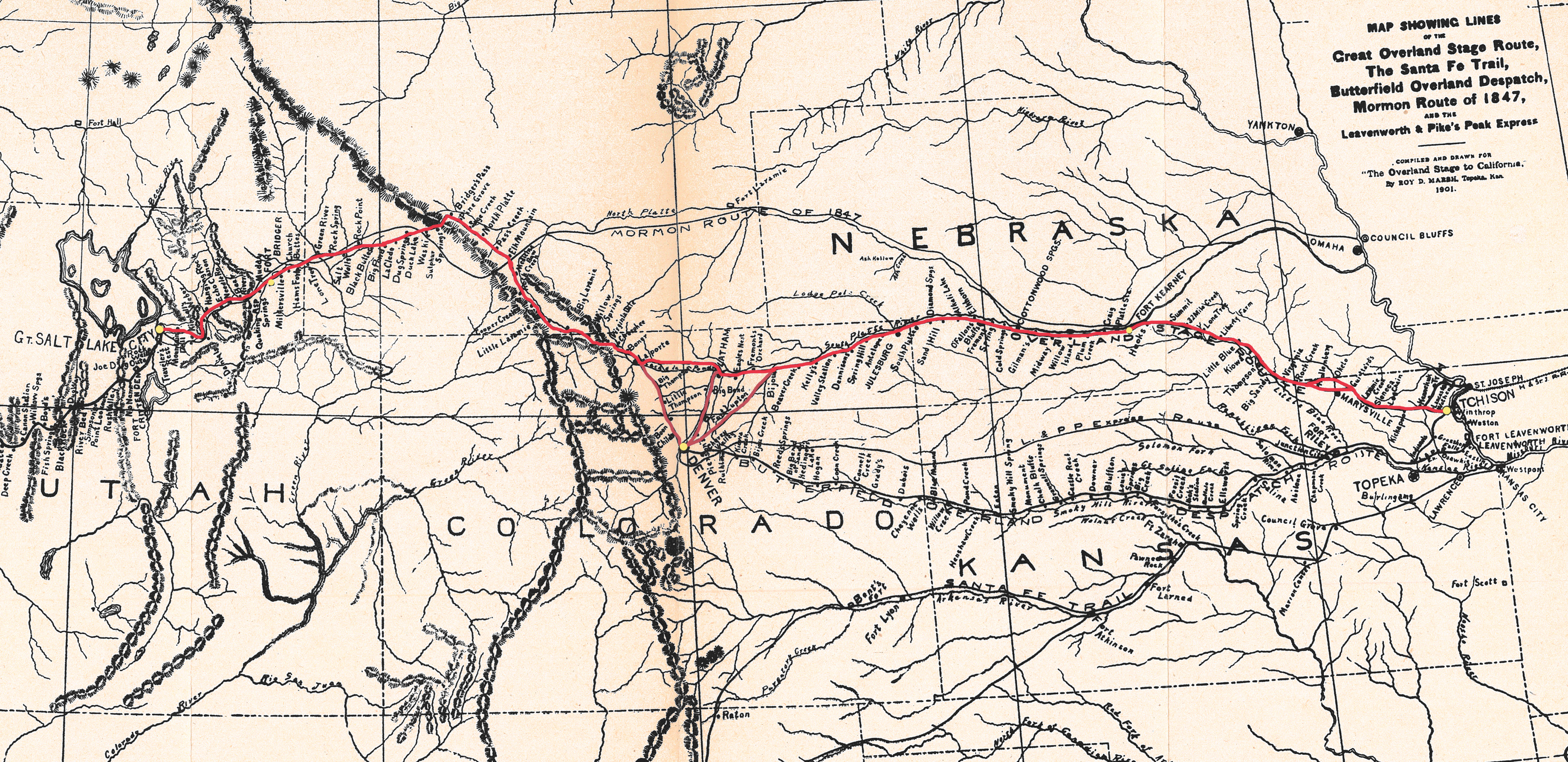
Route of the Overland Trail between Atchison, Kansas and Salt Lake City, Utah Territory; includes connecting routes to Denver.

According to Erb, Brown, and Hughes, "Holladay's Mail and Stage route extended from Atchison, Kansas to Salt Lake City and California. As the trail entered the northeast corner of Colorado along the South Platte River at Old Julesburg, it departed from the Oregon-California trail, which continued on north to the North Platte and Ft. Laramie and over South Pass, while the new mail route continued to the west and became known as the Overland Stage and Mail Line, or simply the Overland Trail."

Stations along the route, proceeding east to west, included Julesburg, Antelope, Spring Hill, Dennison's, Valley, Kelley's, Beaver Creek, Bijou, Fremont's Orchard, Eagle's Nest, Latham, Sherwood, Laporte, Park Creek, Bonner, Stonewall Cherokee, Virginia Dale, Willow Springs, Big Laramie, Little Laramie, Cooper Creek, Rock Creek, Medicine Bow, Elk Mountain, Fort Halleck, Pass Creek, North Platte, Sage Creek, Pine Grove, Bridger's Pass, Sulphur Springs, Washakie, Duck Lake, Dug Springs, LaClede, Big Pond, Black Buttes, Point of Rocks, Salt Wells, Rock Springs, Green River, Lone Tree, Granger, Ham's Fork, Church Buttes, Millersville, and Fort Bridger. Stations north from Denver to Laporte included Childs or Churches, Boones, St. Vrain, Little Thompson, Big Thompson, and Spring Creek. Stations north from Denver to Latham included Pierson's, Fort Lupton, and Big Bend.

The Walbach cut-off was heavily traveled by emigrants in the 1850s, avoiding the dip down south into Colorado and back north. It originated near Julesburg and followed Lodgepole Creek, across the Laramie Mountains, and Laramie Plains, before joining the Overland Trail at the Little Laramie Station. Camp Walbach was located along the trail where it entered the Laramie Mountains.

== Remnants ==
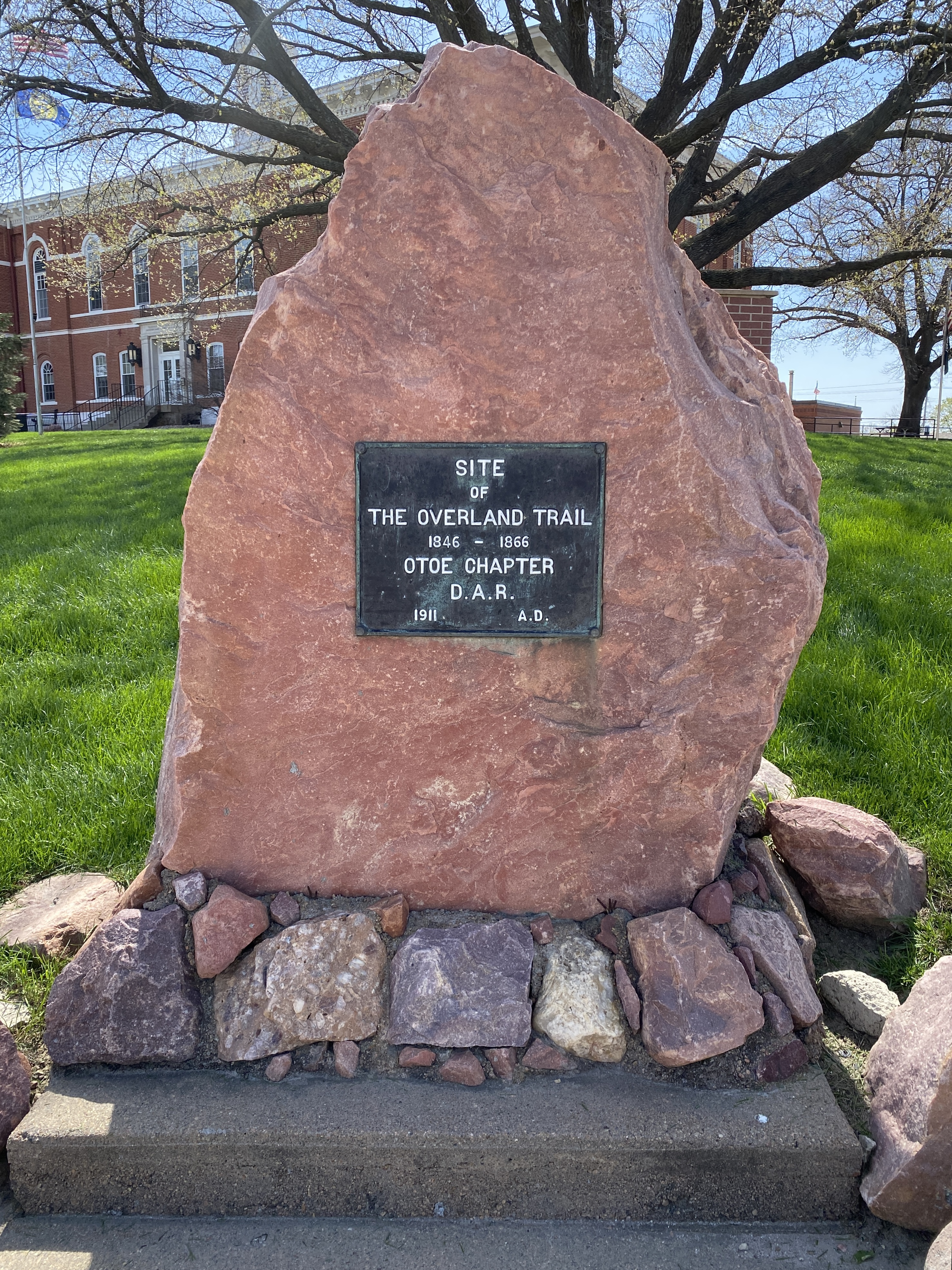
Overland Trail marker in Nebraska City

Several modern highways follow the same route as the Overland Trail. Interstate 76 follows the South Platte River to Fort Morgan, Colorado, and U.S. Route 34 goes between Fort Morgan and Greeley. North of Fort Collins, U.S. Route 287 follows the path of the Overland Trail north to Laramie. West of Laramie the Overland Trail route was closely followed by the Union Pacific Railroad in 1869 and the Lincoln Highway and Interstate 80 in the 20th century.

Remains of stage stops are scattered throughout Wyoming and northern Colorado including well preserved buildings at Virginia Dale, Colorado and Point of Rocks, Wyoming. The trail is occasionally marked with markers and historical signs where the trail crosses a highway. Switchbacks on the route can be clearly seen when on highway 287, just north of the town of Laporte, Colorado, above the present day Forks Lumber company, and portions of the route just east of that spot are well preserved and easily seen (although they are crossing through private property).

Cabins from Camp Collins an army post and stop along the Overland Trail are located at the Heritage Center at the Fort Collins Museum and Discovery Science Center. Included is the oldest cabin of Fort Collins "Auntie" Stone, who provided food to Camp Collins post officers and a small hotel and resting spot for Overland Trail passengers.

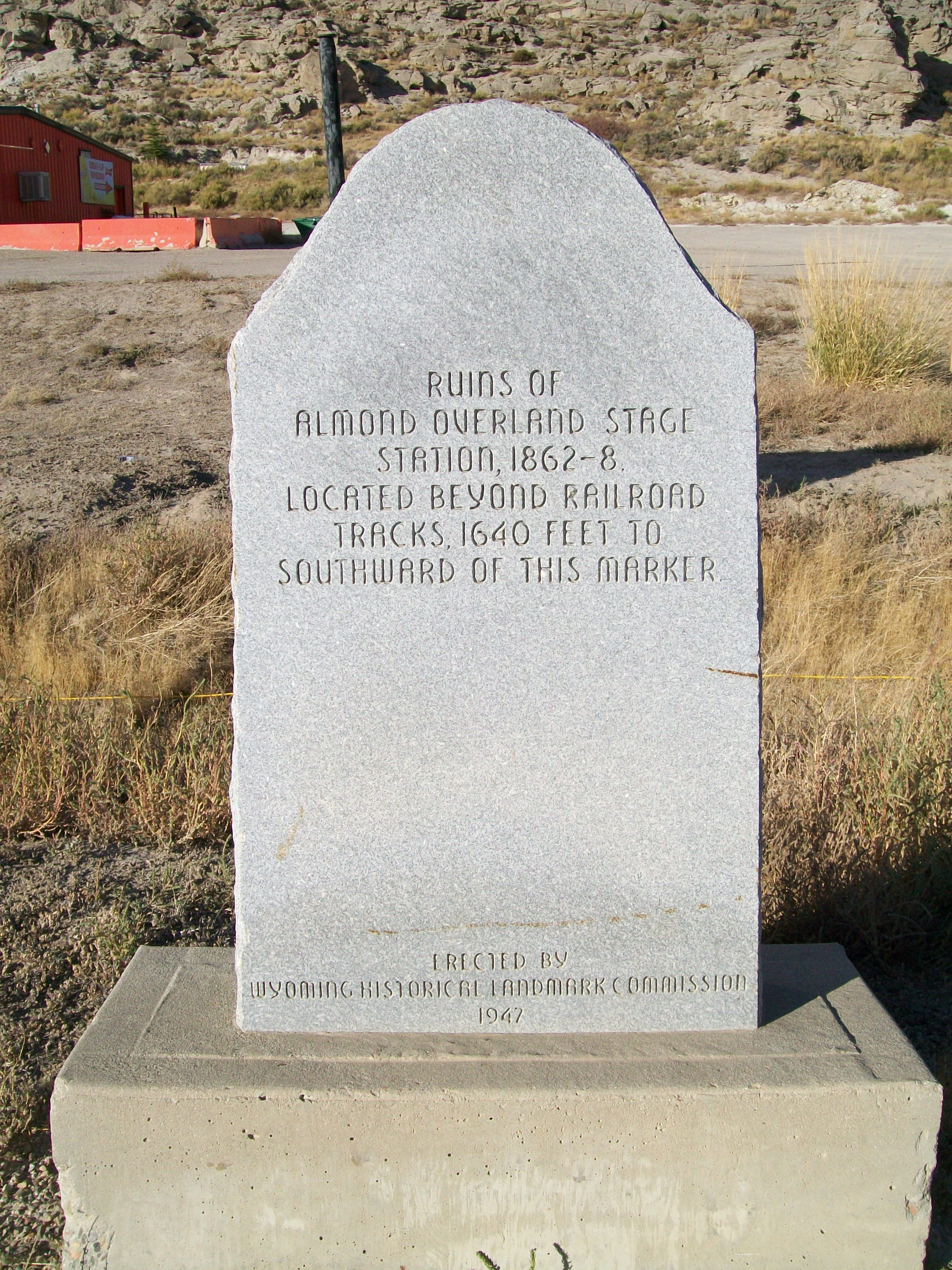
A stone marker denoting the Almond stage stop at Point of Rocks, Wyoming

== Stage stops and notable landmarks ==
- Julesburg, Colorado
- North Platte River Crossing – Carbon County, Wyoming
- Bear River City, Wyoming
- Granger, Wyoming
- Point of Rocks, Wyoming
- Rattlesnake Station – Elmore County, Idaho
- Rock Creek Station and Stricker Homesite – Twin Falls County, Idaho

== Overland Trail Museum ==
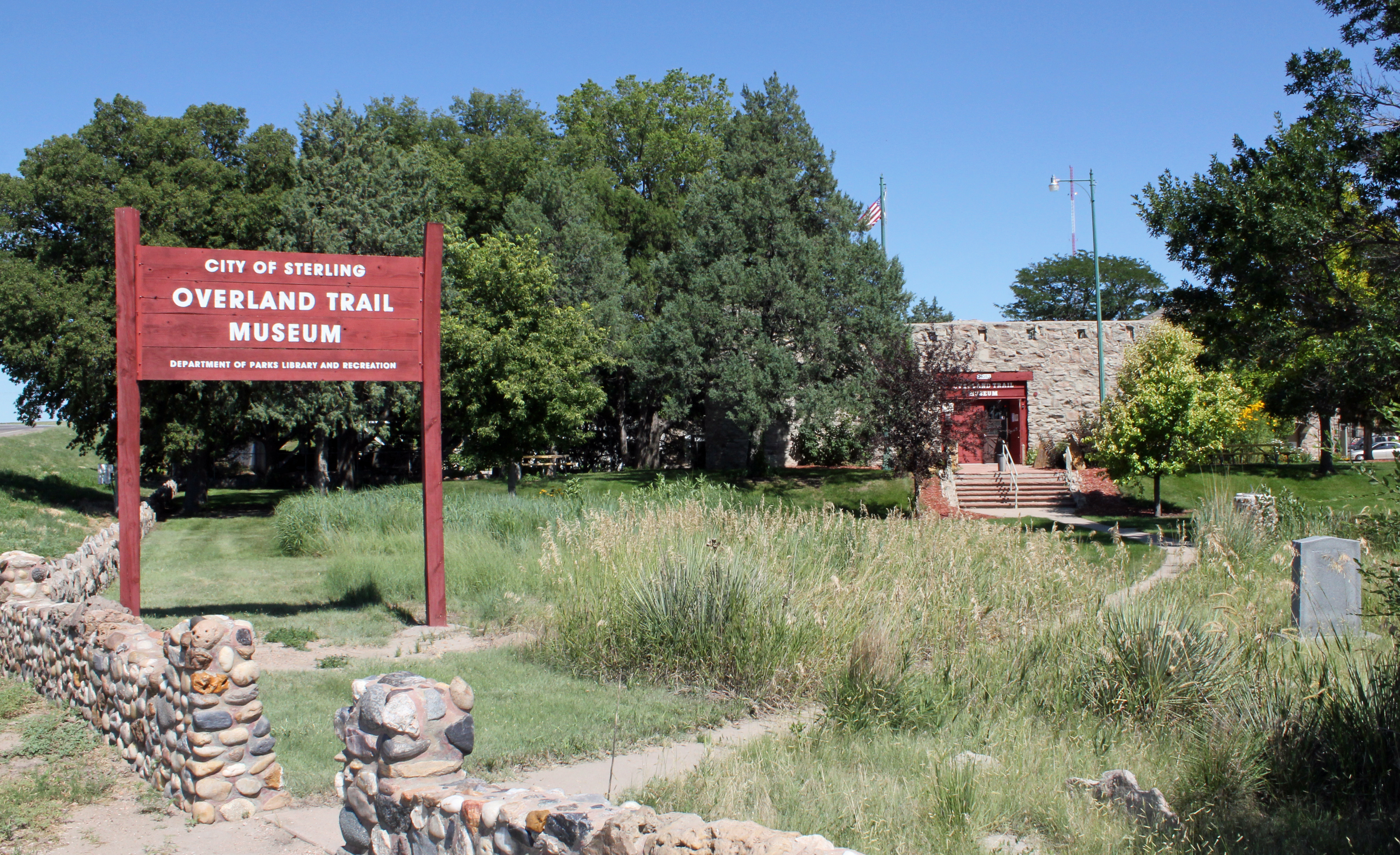
The Overland Trail Museum in Sterling, Colorado

The city of Sterling, Colorado, operates the Overland Trail Museum, located on US Route 6, just east of the South Platte River. Opened in 1936, the museum contains dioramas and artifacts that relate to the history of the trail and to the city of Sterling.

== See also ==
- Butterfield Overland Mail
- Fort Morgan Cut-Off
- Oregon Trail
