= Duck Lake Station Site =

- U.S. National Register of Historic Places
- Nearest city: Wamsutter, Wyoming
- Area: 1 acre (0.40 ha)
- Built: 1862
- NRHP reference No.: 78002825
- Added to NRHP: December 6, 1978

The Duck Lake Station Site is a former way station on the Overland Trail in Carbon County, Wyoming. Built in 1862, the site is located between the Dug Springs Station to the west and the Washakie Station to the east. Stations on the trail were typically about 15 miles (24 km) apart with the largest, most elaborate stations at 50-mile (80 km) intervals. The Duck Lake station was a more basic one-room building. All that remains of the station are its foundations. The site was placed on the National Register of Historic Places on December 6, 1978.

== See also ==
- Washakie Station Site the stop before Duck Lake Station
- Dug Springs Station Site the stop after Duck Lake Station
