= Richardson's Overland Trail Ranch =

- U.S. National Register of Historic Places
- U.S. Historic district
- Location within Wyoming Location within the United States
- Location: 111 Hart Rd., Laramie, Wyoming
- Coordinates: 41°15′1″N 105°41′19″W
- Area: 4 acres (1.6 ha)
- Architectural style: Log
- NRHP reference No.: 92000122
- Added to NRHP: March 5, 1992

Richardson's Overland Trail Ranch is a complex of seven ranch buildings at the crossing of the Big Laramie River by the Overland Trail. The ranch's main residence was built as a stage station for the trail in 1862, the Big Laramie Stage Station. The Big Laramie Stage Station was a home station, where stage drivers rested, passengers were served meals and horses were changed. A corduroy road was built at the same time. By 1864 ranching became established around the stage station, primarily by Tom Alsop, Edward Creighton and Charlie Hutton. With Creighton's death in 1874 the land was divided between Alsop on the west side of the river and Hutton on the east side. The ranch on the west side became known as the Heart or Hart Ranch. The ranches at the river crossing became part of the larger Riverside Livestock Company.

At the beginning of the twentieth century the stage station at the Hart Ranch was sold to D.C. Buntin and James Caldwell, who started a polo pony breeding operation and added buildings. Caldwell committed suicide in the wake of the Teapot Dome Scandal and the ranch was sold. Otto Clausen initially operated the ranch as a dude ranch from 1929, but the Great Depression reduced operations to subsistence farming. Clausen sold to T.H. and Ella Therkkildsen in 1944, who managed the ranch until they passed it on to their daughter Marge and her husband T.H. Richardson in 1974.

== Description ==
The main house is a one-story log structure in three sections with interior log partitions. It retains its original character. Other structures include the 1910 polo barn, the so-called "damn good shed," built about 1930 in board-and-batten construction, a log cabin that was moved to the site in the 1930s from Fox Park, the log "Little Cabin," and the "Long Shed," also moved to the site from Fox Park. An intact section of the Overland Trail corduroy road is about 300 feet (91 m) north of the ranch complex.

Richardson's Overland Trail Ranch was placed on the National Register of Historic Places on March 5, 1992.

== See also ==
- Wyoming historical monuments and markers
- Willow Springs (Albany County, Wyoming)
- Little Laramie Stage Station
