= L. H. Musgrove =

American outlaw

Lewis H. Musgrave
- Born: 1832 (Note: Musgrove seems to have been born between June and November of 1832.); Illinois
- Died: November 23, 1868 (age 36); Denver, Colorado
- Cause of death: Hanging by vigilante group
- Other name: L. H. Musgrove
- Years active: 1863-1868
- Organization: Musgrove Gang
- Known for: Stealing government livestock and his public hanging in Denver
- Criminal charges: Murder of four men and stealing $100,000 worth of government livestock

Lewis H. Musgrove (1832 – November 23, 1868), known later in life as L. H. Musgrove, was an outlaw in the American Old West. Beginning in 1864, he led the Musgrove Gang, who stole government livestock throughout Wyoming, Colorado and the surrounding western states and territories. Musgrave was eventually caught and brought to Denver, Colorado, where he was taken by a group of citizens and hung from the Larimer Street Bridge on November 26, 1868. A detailed account of Musgrove’s criminal activities, capture, and hanging appeared in a memoir by the City Marshal of Denver, David J. Cook.

== Early life ==
Lewis Musgrave was born in Illinois in 1832 to Thomas C. Musgrave (1808-1868) and Sarah Elizabeth Maxwell (1812-after 1860). The exact date of his birth is unknown, though records point to some time between June and November 1832. Musgrave grew up in Tennessee, the home state of his father and where his younger brothers were born. The Musgrave family moved to northern Mississippi when Lewis was about 8 years old. In 1850 Lewis Musgrave, age 18, was still living with his family in Panola County, Mississippi. (Note: In US Census records, both Lewis and his parents cite Illinois as the state where he was born, though other less reliable reports say he was from Mississippi where he lived after age 8.)

In the early 1850s, shortly after the California Gold Rush, Musgrave moved to the Napa Valley in Northern California, where three of his cousins and an uncle were living. In the town of Hot Springs, later called Calistoga, he met and married Catherine Fowler (1821-1862) in May 1856. Recently widowed, Catherine was the step-daughter of Calvin Musgrave (1820-1885), one of Lewis Musgrave’s cousins. Lewis and Catherine had three children together while living in Hot Springs: Edward, Ellen and Florina. Catherine Fowler Musgrave died in January 1862, less than a year after the birth of their third child. Lewis and Catherine’s children continued to live in Hot Springs with Catherine’s mother, Kitty Musgrave, who was married to Lewis’ cousin Calvin Musgrave.

== Outlaw ==
In the Napa Valley, some time in the early 1860s, Lewis Musgrave had an argument with a man over their respective Civil War loyalties. Musgrave shot the man and was run out of the area. He reportedly moved to the Nevada Territory where he killed two men. Heading east, Musgrave became an Indian trader near Fort Halleck, Wyoming. There he had a confrontation a man of Native American and European heritage who called Musgrave a liar. Musgrave shot the man in the forehead. He was arrested for that murder in Fort Halleck, Wyoming in 1863. He was sent to Denver for trial, where he was released because of a legal technicality.

By 1864, Lewis Musgrave had become the leader of a group of outlaws who stole government livestock, often using violence and murder. The group was known as the Musgrove Gang. According to Leadville Daily Herald, “the Musgrove gang ... was possibly the largest and most desperate lot of men that was ever joined together in the west for unlawful purposes. The members of the band were to be found in every state and territory—with the exception of three—west of the Mississippi river.”

In September 1864, the Musgrove Gang stole fifty head of cattle from Fort Steele. They returned to the fort the next month and stole the cavalry horses. None of the animals were recovered, and there was suspicion the gang received help from within the ranks of the Fort.

There were many newspaper accounts of the Musgrove Gang stealing government livestock between 1865 and 1868. In 1867, Musgrave killed a man and stole a horse in Poudre Canyon. In the spring of 1868, Musgrave ran off livestock in Colorado near Poudre Canyon near Laporte. Later he had a run in with the soldiers near Cedar Point, east of Denver.

On September 29, 1868, Edward Franklin and one other man from the Musgrove Gang stole mules from Fort Sanders. When local lawmen pursued them, both men were wounded by gunfire and apprehended.

== Capture ==
On October 25, 1868 near Elk Mountain, Wyoming, a train was attacked by sixteen members of the Musgrove Gang who were disguised as Native Americans. The gang often used this disguise with the intention of passing the blame for their crimes on to Native Americans. The Musgrove Gang stole sixteen mules. During the attack members of the gang killed four men, scalping two of them. However, three of the train men managed to escape.

On October 28, 1868, Lewis Musgrave was arrested near Elk Mountain, Wyoming by a local man named John Cronin. Cronin chased Musgrave for miles and eventually captured him. Cronin bound Musgrave's feet and hands and took him as his prisoner to Fort Steele. According to Cronin, Musgrave offered him $200 for his release, but Cronin refused. On the train to Fort Steele, Musgrave complained that his legs were bound too tightly. When the bindings on his feet were removed, Musgrave leapt from the slow moving train, only to be recaptured. At the Fort, Musgrave was charged with the death of the four train men and stealing $100,000 worth of government livestock.

On October 31, 1868, members of the Musgrove Gang, again disguised as Native Americans, were responsible for a train wreck on the Union Pacific Railroad near Fort Steele, Wyoming. One train worker was killed. The gang may have caused the train wreck to prevent authorities from moving Musgrave to Denver, or it might have been a plot to help Musgrave escape.

Securely bound with shackles and handcuffs, Musgrave was escorted by forty soldiers from Fort Steele to Denver, Colorado to await trial at the Arapahoe County Jail. (Note: Denver’s Arapahoe County Jail was at 14th and Larimer Streets.)

== Hanging ==
Still intent on helping Musgrave escape, his right-hand man, Edward Franklin headed for Denver as well. He was accompanied by Sanford Duggan, another outlaw but not a member of the Musgrove Gang. Both had recently been caught by the law, but had managed to escape. On November 20, 1868, as Franklin and Duggan made their way to the jail under the cover of night, they took the time to commit three robberies at gunpoint, including holding up a local judge. At the jail, the outlaws met with Musgrave, who later told the jailers that his escape had been planned and was assured.

Two days later, based on a tip, City Marshal Cook went to Golden, Colorado with the intention of apprehending Franklin and Duggan. That night Cook and his men found Duggan in a saloon where they exchanged gunfire, but Duggan managed to escape. Next, Cook found Franklin in a hotel room nearby. Despite trying to arrest Franklin, the ensuing gunfight ended in Franklin’s death.

By noon the next day, the people of Denver began to talk about lynching Musgrave. In the afternoon outside the jail, a large crowd had gathered, including many prominent citizens. Those gathered were asked if Musgrave should be taken out and hung, to which they generally agreed. Musgrave was subdued by members of the public and removed from the jail. He was taken by the crowd to the nearby Larimer Street Bridge on Cherry Creek.

Musgrave asked his captures to allow him to write to his family. He was given a pencil and paper on which he wrote notes to his brother and his wife:

DENVER, Nov. 23d, 68.

MY DEAR BROTHER:
I am to bee hung to-day on false charges by a mob my children is in
Napa valley Cal — will you go and get them & take care of them for me god
Knows that I am innocent pray for me—but I was here when the mob took
me. Brother good by forEver—take care of my pore little children I remain
your unfortunate Brother

good bie
L H MUSGROVE

The above was directed to W. C. Musgrove, Como Depot, Miss.

DENVER C. T.,

MY DEAR WIFE: Before this reaches you I will be no more, Mary
I am as you know innocent of the charges made against me. I do not know
what they are agoing to hang me for unless it is because I am acquainted
with Ed Franklin—godd will protect you I hope good bye for ever as ever
yours sell what I have and keep it.

L. H. MUSGROVE.

This was directed to Mrs M. E. Musgrove, Cheyenne, W. T.

[As published in the Cheyenne Leader, No. 58, November 25, 1868, page 1.]

The first letter was addressed to Musgrave’s older brother, William Musgrave, who lived in or near Como Depot in Panola County, Mississippi. The children he referred to in his note were from his marriage to his first wife, Catherine Fowler Musgrave and lived in Napa Valley. (Note: These letters quoted in the newspapers help connect the outlaw L. H. Musgrove with the Lewis H. Musgrave who lived in Napa Valley. A descendant of the Napa Valley family, Fowler Mallett, wrote a family history in which he discussed Musgrave being hung, affirming the connection to the family. Mallett doubted the characterization of Musgrave as an outlaw, taking the letters at face value. Perhaps Mallett did not want to cast a shadow on the family. The history is: Mallett, Fowler. Genealogical Notes and Anecdotes. Berkeley, CA. Unpublished Manuscript. 1953. Sonoma County History and Genealogy Library (accessed July 17, 2019).)

The second letter was to his wife, Mary. She was from Missouri, but was living in Cheyenne, Wyoming Territories when Lewis was hanged.

When he had finished writing his letters, Musgrave was bound and taken under the bridge where a noose had been prepared. With the noose around his neck, Musgrave rolled and slowly smoked his final cigarette. As the wagon pulled away, Musgrave jumped into the air to ensure a quick death.

The hanging was depicted in an engraving by Alexander Phimister Proctor and was included in City Marshal David Cook’s memoirs.

With the deaths of Musgrave and Franklin, the Musgrove Gang dissolved.

== In popular culture ==
The Emmy award-winning Western TV series, Stories of the Century, featured a fictitious detective who each week captured a different notorious outlaw of the Wild West. The series ran in 1954 and 1955. In the final episode, L. H. Musgrove is portrayed by John Archer, in a story loosely based on the actual events of Lewis Musgrave, including his hanging.
