= Dug Springs Station Site =

- U.S. National Register of Historic Places
- Nearest city: Rock Springs, Wyoming
- Area: less than one acre
- Built: 1862
- NRHP reference No.: 77001384
- Added to NRHP: September 22, 1977

The Dug Springs Station Site is a former way station on the Overland Trail in Sweetwater County, Wyoming. Constructed about 1862, the station was built with rock slab walls, between Laclede Station and Duck Lake Station. The site was placed on the National Register of Historic Places on December 6, 1978.

== See also ==
- Duck Lake Station stop before Dug Springs Station
- Laclede Station Ruin stop after Dug Springs Station
