= David J. Cook =

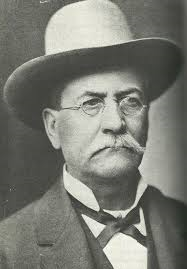
- Born: August 12, 1840; La Porte, Indiana
- Died: April 29, 1907 (aged 66); Denver, Colorado
- Burial place: Riverside Cemetery
- Occupation: Lawman
- Military career
- Allegiance: United States
- Branch: Union Army
- Service years: 1861–1878
- Rank: Counterespionage
- Conflicts: American Civil War

David J. Cook (1840/1842 – April 2, 1907) was an American western lawman and City Marshal of Denver, Colorado, responsible for over 3,000 arrests.

== Biography ==
=== Early years ===
Cook was born near La Porte, Indiana. Growing up, he worked as a farmhand before moving to Kansas in 1855, and then in 1859 to Gilpin County, Colorado, looking to prospect for gold.

=== Military and law enforcement career ===
In 1861 he joined the Colorado Cavalry upon the outbreak of the American Civil War, and was later assigned to counterespionage for the Union Army, tracking Confederate spies, investigating gold smuggling and similar crimes.

His success led him to found the "Rocky Mountain Detective Association", a freelance, volunteer-only group of Colorado troubleshooters, similar in character to the Pinkerton Detective Agency. Although its offices were in Denver, its cases took him all over the west. From 1866 to 1869, Cook served as marshal of Denver, as well as acting as a federal marshal and range detective.

In 1868 Cook tracked down the notorious Musgrove-Franklin Gang, who were credited with twelve murders, and apprehended gang leader L. H. Musgrove in the Wyoming Territory. Having subsequently transported Musgrove to jail in Denver, Cook cleverly predicted his partner Ed Franklin would attempt a rescue. Upon Franklin's arrival into Denver, Cook tracked him to a room in the Overland Hotel. Franklin reportedly reached for a pistol and Cook shot him to death.

In 1878, Cook helped quell a major revolt of the Ute tribe in Colorado. In 1880, he served as the arbitrator in a silver mine strike at Leadville, Colorado. Over the course of his tenure, he was responsible for 3,000 arrests.

=== Memoir ===
In 1882 Cook published a memoir titled Hands Up! or Thirty-five Years of Detective Work in the Mountains and on the Plains, either writing it himself or dictating it to another. It is rumored to have been ghostwritten by Thomas F. Dawson, editor of the Denver Times and personal secretary to Senator Henry Teller. Although a purported autobiography, it is written entirely in the third person. It remains the sole major source of knowledge about Cook's life and accomplishments.

=== Death ===
Cook lived in Denver until his death. He was buried in Denver's Riverside Cemetery.

== Sources ==
- Sifakis, Carl. Encyclopedia of American Crime, New York, Facts on File Inc., 1982
- Nash, Robert (1994). Encyclopedia of Western Lawmen & Outlaws. Da Capo Press. ISBN 0-306-80591-X.
- Gibson, E. David Cook and the Rocky Mountain Detective Agency, which uses as its source Hands Up! or Twenty Years of Detective Work in the Mountains and on the Plains (ostensibly written by Cook)

Police appointments
Preceded by Arlington O. Ashley	City Marshal of Denver, Colorado; 1866–1869	Succeeded by George M. Hopkins
Preceded by Richard Sopris	Sheriff of Arapahoe County, Colorado; 1869–1873	Succeeded by Edmund A. Willoughby
