= Laclede Station Ruin =

- U.S. National Register of Historic Places
- Nearest city: Rock Springs, Wyoming
- Area: less than one acre
- NRHP reference No.: 78002833
- Added to NRHP: December 6, 1978

The Laclede Station Ruin is a former way station on the Overland Trail in Sweetwater County, Wyoming, between the Big Pond Station and the Dug Springs Station. Constructed in the 1860s, the station was built of stone slabs. The ruins of some of its walls remain. The site was placed on the National Register of Historic Places on December 6, 1978. From the LaClede Station, was a trail heading southwest, the Pine Butte Cuttoff to Green River, Wyoming.

== See also ==
- Dug Springs Station Site stop before Laclede Station Ruin
- Big Pond Station Site stop after Laclede Station Ruin
