= Bitter Creek (Wyoming) =

Stream in Wyoming, United States

Coordinates: 41°31′06″N 109°26′53″W

Bitter Creek is an 80-mile-long stream in the U.S. state of Wyoming. It passes through several Wyoming counties, including Sweetwater and Carbon. The creek rises near the Delaney Rim, on the western side of Wyoming's Red Desert in Carbon County. For most of its course, Bitter Creek parallels the path of the transcontinental railroad and the modern route of Interstate 80. It flows through the cities of Rock Springs and Green River before emptying into the Green River.

In the coal-mining heyday for Rock Springs in the late 19th century, the creek formed a boundary between a Union Pacific coal-mining camp on the south and an encampment of Chinese immigrant workers on the north. On September 2, 1885, a mob of white miners, angry over labor and racial tensions, took control of several bridges over the creek and attacked the Chinese encampment in the Rock Springs Massacre.

Several railroad-built bridges cross the creek at various points between the two towns. A dirt road used for tower access of a Green River radio station KUGR requires a high-clearance vehicle with four-wheel drive to cross the creek. Most of the roads that run parallel to the creek in Sweetwater County are on railroad property.

Bitter Creek was referred to in the TV show M*A*S*H (Season 5, Episode 20) as the hometown for Corporal Mulligan (played by Larry Wilcox).

== Name ==
Bitter Creek is named as such for its high alkali and mineral content, being near impossible to drink. In the mid-19th century, the creek was a dreaded segment of the Overland Trail. Travelers and teamsters frequently described the region as a "horrible and irreclaimable desert" due to the lack of potable water and the harsh, salty soil. The water was so saturated with minerals that it was famously described as being "too hard to drink" and was a primary source of hardship for pioneers crossing the high desert of Sweetwater County.

== Climate ==
According to the Köppen Climate Classification system, Bitter Creek has a cold semi-arid climate, abbreviated "BSk" on climate maps. The hottest temperature recorded in Bitter Creek was 103 °F (39 °C) on July 18, 1969, while the coldest temperature recorded was −46 °F (−43 °C) on January 4, 1972.

Climate data for Bitter Creek, Wyoming, 1991–2020 normals, extremes 1962–present
Month	Jan	Feb	Mar	Apr	May	Jun	Jul	Aug	Sep	Oct	Nov	Dec	Year
Record high °F (°C)	57 (14)	59 (15)	73 (23)	83 (28)	87 (31)	97 (36)	103 (39)	97 (36)	92 (33)	82 (28)	69 (21)	63 (17)	103 (39)
Mean maximum °F (°C)	45.7 (7.6)	49.7 (9.8)	61.3 (16.3)	70.8 (21.6)	80.2 (26.8)	88.6 (31.4)	93.3 (34.1)	91.8 (33.2)	85.8 (29.9)	74.5 (23.6)	61.0 (16.1)	47.7 (8.7)	94.0 (34.4)
Mean daily maximum °F (°C)	33.1 (0.6)	35.9 (2.2)	46.2 (7.9)	55.1 (12.8)	65.4 (18.6)	77.2 (25.1)	85.5 (29.7)	83.3 (28.5)	73.2 (22.9)	58.4 (14.7)	44.0 (6.7)	33.1 (0.6)	57.5 (14.2)
Daily mean °F (°C)	22.0 (−5.6)	24.8 (−4.0)	34.7 (1.5)	42.1 (5.6)	51.0 (10.6)	60.5 (15.8)	68.1 (20.1)	66.2 (19.0)	56.9 (13.8)	44.4 (6.9)	32.0 (0.0)	22.0 (−5.6)	43.7 (6.5)
Mean daily minimum °F (°C)	11.0 (−11.7)	13.8 (−10.1)	23.3 (−4.8)	29.0 (−1.7)	36.6 (2.6)	43.8 (6.6)	50.7 (10.4)	49.1 (9.5)	40.7 (4.8)	30.3 (−0.9)	20.0 (−6.7)	10.9 (−11.7)	29.9 (−1.1)
Mean minimum °F (°C)	−16.7 (−27.1)	−12.3 (−24.6)	1.8 (−16.8)	12.6 (−10.8)	21.7 (−5.7)	30.5 (−0.8)	38.3 (3.5)	36.0 (2.2)	23.8 (−4.6)	10.7 (−11.8)	−3.4 (−19.7)	−15.4 (−26.3)	−23.3 (−30.7)
Record low °F (°C)	−46 (−43)	−42 (−41)	−25 (−32)	−10 (−23)	7 (−14)	18 (−8)	27 (−3)	17 (−8)	−2 (−19)	−20 (−29)	−29 (−34)	−41 (−41)	−46 (−43)
Average precipitation inches (mm)	0.36 (9.1)	0.40 (10)	0.53 (13)	0.62 (16)	1.22 (31)	0.66 (17)	0.54 (14)	0.65 (17)	0.74 (19)	0.70 (18)	0.42 (11)	0.46 (12)	7.30 (185)
Average snowfall inches (cm)	4.2 (11)	2.2 (5.6)	1.2 (3.0)	1.1 (2.8)	0.0 (0.0)	0.0 (0.0)	0.0 (0.0)	0.0 (0.0)	0.0 (0.0)	0.9 (2.3)	2.4 (6.1)	2.4 (6.1)	14.4 (36.9)
Average precipitation days (≥ 0.01 in)	4.0	3.5	4.1	5.7	7.4	4.5	4.2	4.1	5.6	4.8	4.5	4.2	56.6
Average snowy days (≥ 0.1 in)	1.7	1.3	0.6	0.6	0.0	0.0	0.0	0.0	0.0	0.2	1.2	1.5	7.1
Source 1: National Weather Service
Source 2: NOAA (average snowfall/snowy days 1981–2010)

== See also ==
- Rock Springs Massacre
- List of rivers of Wyoming
