= Bridger Pass =

- Bridger's Pass; Name origin: Jim Bridger
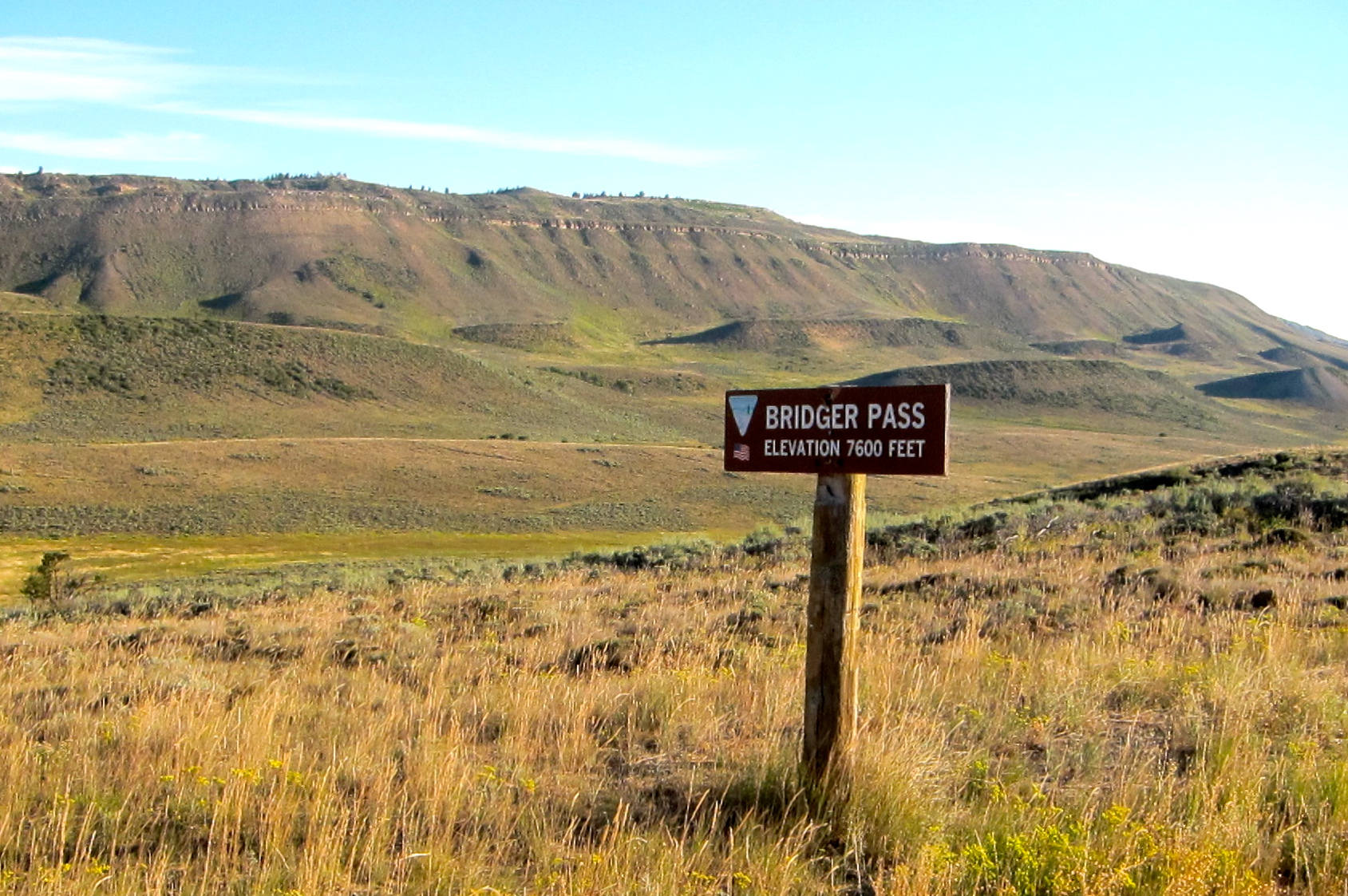
- Hiking along Bridger Pass Road in the Divide Basin
- Interactive map of Bridger Pass
- Elevation: 7,532 ft (2,296 m)
- Traversed by: Stansbury Expedition Cherokee Trail Overland Trail

Location
- Range: Sierra Madre (Wyoming)
- Coordinates: 41°33′02″N 107°26′05″W
- Bridger's Pass
- U.S. National Register of Historic Places
- Location within Wyoming Location within the United States
- Nearest city: Rawlins, Wyoming
- Coordinates: 41°33′3″N 107°26′4″W
- Area: less than one acre
- Built: 1850
- NRHP reference No.: 70000669
- Added to NRHP: April 28, 1970

Bridger Pass is a mountain pass in Carbon County, Wyoming on the Continental Divide of the Americas near the south Great Divide Basin bifurcation point, i.e., the point at which the divide appears to split and envelop the basin.

The first documented crossing of Bridger Pass was by the Stansbury Expedition, returning east from an expedition to Utah and guided by Jim Bridger. A decade later the pass was in regular use by travelers on the Overland Trail and the associated stage line, these having been established along the route described by Stansbury and known since that time as the Cherokee Trail. To support the stage line, the Bridger Stage Station was established near the pass. The Overland Trail was used steadily between 1860 and 1869 until the First transcontinental railroad made the stage line obsolete.

In modern times, the official route of the Continental Divide Trail uses Bridger Pass Road to navigate the Great Divide Basin between Battle Pass on Wyoming Highway 70 and Rawlins, Wyoming. A challenge to hikers is the lack of potable water along this section due to the brackish nature (salinity) of water in the basin.

== See also ==
- Sulphur Springs Station Site the stop before Bridger Pass
- Washakie Station Site the stop after Bridger Pass
