= Sage Creek Station Site =

- U.S. National Register of Historic Places
- Nearest city: Rawlins, Wyoming
- Area: less than one acre
- Built: 1862
- NRHP reference No.: 78002821
- Added to NRHP: December 6, 1978

The Sage Creek Station Site is a former way station on the Overland Trail in Carbon County, Wyoming. Constructed about 1862, the station was built of logs with an adobe fireplace and a dirt roof over pole rafters. The site burned on June 8, 1865, but may have been rebuilt. All that remains of the station are its foundations. The site was placed on the National Register of Historic Places on December 6, 1978.

== See also ==
- Platte River Crossing stop before Sage Creek Station
- Pine Grove Station Site stop after Sage Creek Station
