= Platte River Crossing =

- U.S. National Register of Historic Places
- Location within Wyoming
- Nearest city: Saratoga, Wyoming
- Coordinates: 41°34′21″N 106°57′45″W
- Area: 12.5 acres (5.1 ha)
- Built: 1849
- NRHP reference No.: 71000885
- Added to NRHP: August 12, 1971

The Platte River Crossing, also known as Bennett's Crossing, is the point at which the Overland Trail crossed the North Platte River in Carbon County, Wyoming. The site is a natural ford created by an island in the middle of the river with a firm river bottom on either side. The location was used as a ford by Native Americans before the arrival of Europeans in the West. The first Europeans to use the site were members of the William Henry Ashley fur-trading expedition of 1825, followed by John C. Frémont in 1843. In 1850, Howard Stansbury camped at the site, noting the presence of remnant Native American encampments around the site. By the time the Overland Stage Line was established in 1861, the crossing had been used by emigrants for several years. In later years, a ferry was operated at the site by Ed Bennett, leading to the site becoming known as Bennett's Crossing. When the Union Pacific Railway laid tracks through the region in 1868, the crossing fell out of use.

The site is marked by a stone monument on a small parcel of land deeded to the State of Wyoming in 1933. A small cemetery is nearby with eight known graves from the 1860s. The site was listed on the National Register of Historic Places on August 12, 1971.

== See also ==
- Pass Creek Stage Station stop before the Platte River Crossing
- Sage Creek Station Site next stop on the Overland Trail
- Wyoming historical monuments and markers
- Rock Creek Overland Stage Station
