= Washakie Station Site =

- U.S. National Register of Historic Places
- Location within Wyoming
- Nearest city: Rawlins, Wyoming
- Coordinates: 41°28′48″N 107°41′39″W
- Area: less than one acre
- Built: 1862
- NRHP reference No.: 78002822
- Added to NRHP: December 12, 1978

The Washakie Station Site is a former way station on the Overland Trail in Carbon County, Wyoming. Built in 1862, the station was on a heavily traveled stage and emigration route. The station was a stone structure with a dirt roof over pole rafters. Remains of the station consist of foundations and ruined sandstone walls. The site was placed on the National Register of Historic Places on December 6, 1978.

== See also ==
- Bridger Pass the stop before Washakie Station
- Duck Lake Station Site the stop after Washakie Station
