= Rock Springs massacre =

1885 massacre in Wyoming, US

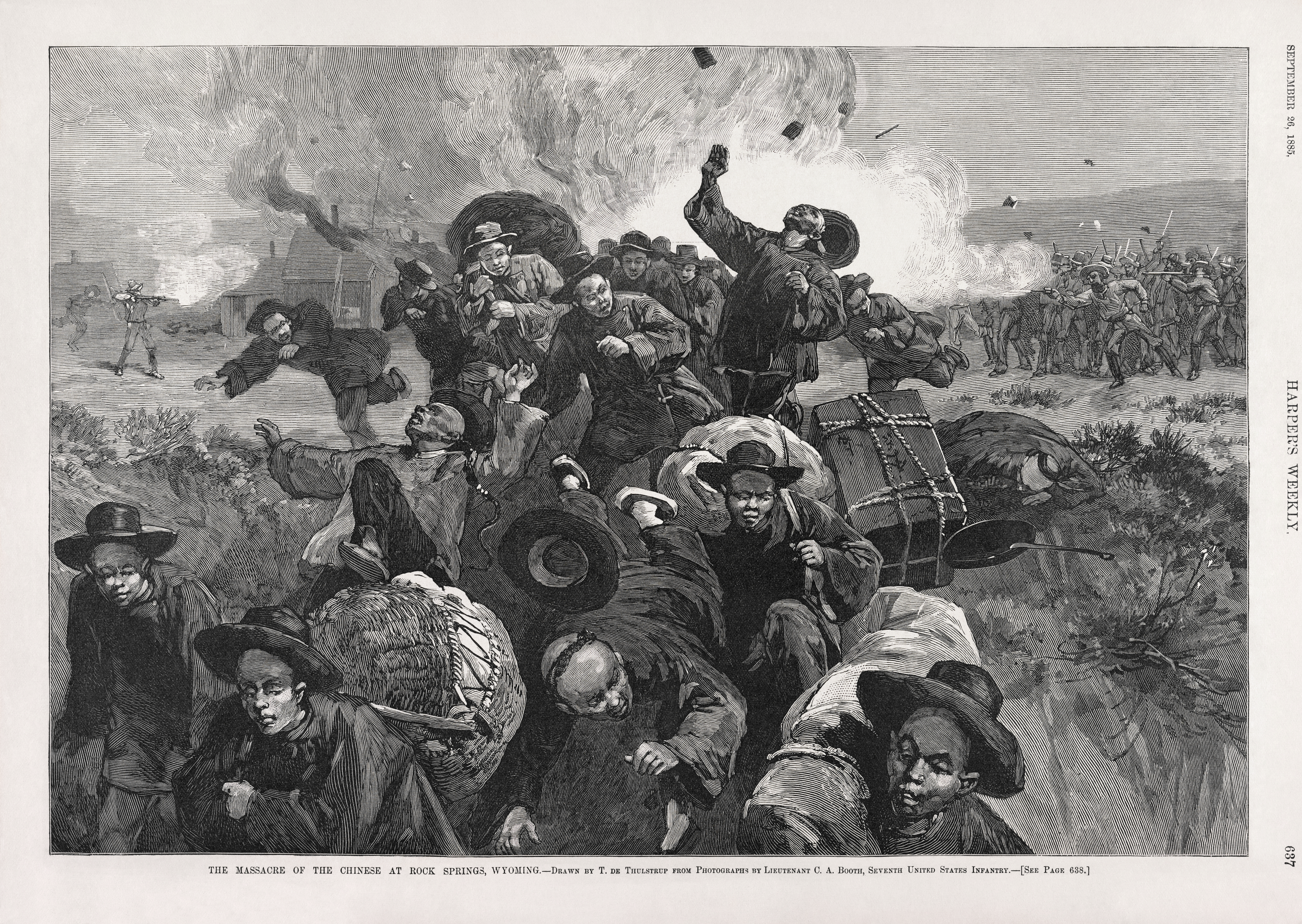
- An illustration of the massacre from an 1885 issue of Harper's Weekly
- Location: 41°35′28″N 109°13′8″W; Rock Springs, Wyoming Territory, U.S.
- Date: September 2, 1885; 7:00 a.m. – late night (UTC-6)
- Attack type: Mass murder, massacre, riot
- Weapon: Various
- Deaths: At least 28 immigrant Chinese miners (some sources indicate as many as 40 to 50 died)
- Injuries: 15
- Victim: Chinese immigrant miners
- Perpetrator: European immigrant miners
- Motive: Ethnic hatred (anti-Chinese sentiment) and economic competition

The Rock Springs massacre, also known as the Rock Springs riot, occurred on September 2, 1885, in the present-day United States city of Rock Springs in Sweetwater County, Wyoming. The riot, and resulting massacre of immigrant Chinese miners by European immigrant miners, was the result of racial prejudice toward the Chinese miners, who were accused of taking jobs from the existing miners. The Union Pacific Coal Department found it economically beneficial to give preference in hiring to Chinese miners, who were willing to work for lower wages than their European counterparts, which angered the existing miners. When the rioting ended, at least 28 Chinese miners were dead and 15 were injured. Rioters burned 78 Chinese homes, resulting in approximately $150,000 in property damage (equal to $4,800,000 in 2025 terms). Despite the identification of the perpetrators, no individuals were prosecuted for the murders or property destruction.

Tension between European and Chinese immigrants in the late 19th-century American West was particularly high, especially in the decade preceding the violence. The massacre in Rock Springs was one among several instances of violence culminating from years of anti-Chinese sentiment in the United States. The Chinese Exclusion Act in 1882 suspended Chinese immigration for ten years, but not before thousands of immigrants came to the American West. Most Chinese immigrants to Wyoming Territory took jobs with the railroad at first, but many ended up employed in coal mines owned by the Union Pacific Railroad. As Chinese immigration increased, so did anti-Chinese sentiment on the part of white Americans. The Knights of Labor, one of the foremost voices against Chinese immigrant labor, formed a chapter in Rock Springs in 1883, and most rioters were members of that organization. However, no direct connection was ever established linking the riot to the national Knights of Labor organization.

In the immediate aftermath of the riot, United States Army troops were deployed in Rock Springs. They escorted the surviving Chinese miners, most of whom had fled to Evanston, Wyoming, back to Rock Springs a week after the riot. Reaction came swiftly from the era's publications. In Rock Springs, the local newspaper endorsed the outcome of the event, while in other Wyoming newspapers, support for the riot was limited to sympathy for the causes of the existing miners. The massacre in Rock Springs touched off a wave of anti-Chinese violence, especially in the Puget Sound area of Washington Territory. It is also the worst mass shooting in Wyoming history.

== Background ==
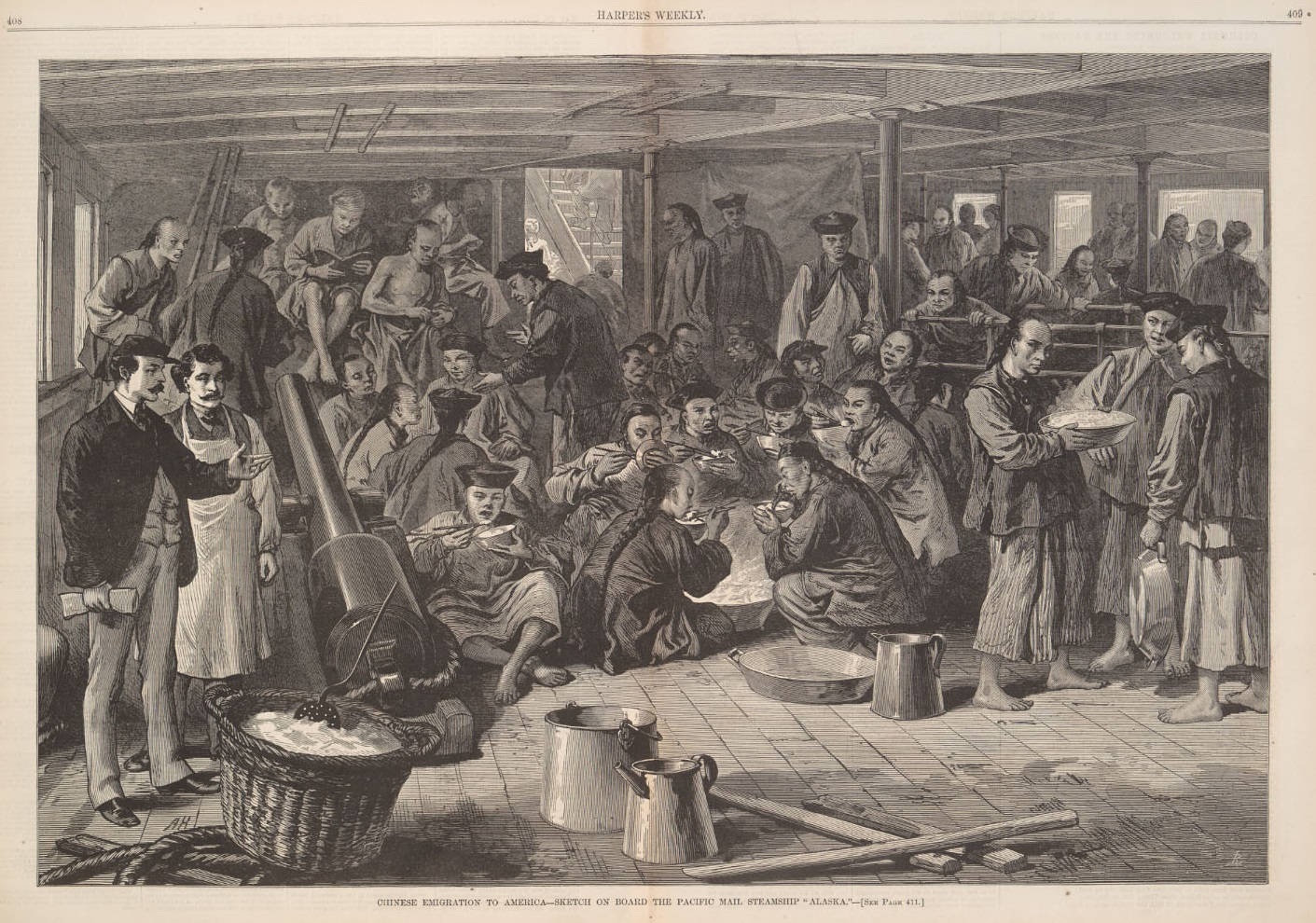
Chinese immigrants, including these bound for California in 1876, settled throughout the American west during the late 19th and early 20th centuries.

Chinese immigration to the United States at that time was neither uniform nor widespread. J. R. Tucker, writing for The North American Review in 1884, stated that the vast majority of the nearly 100,000 Chinese immigrants resided within the American West: California, Nevada, Oregon, and the Washington Territory. The U.S. Minister to China, George Seward, had asserted similar numbers in Scribner's Magazine five years earlier.

The first jobs Chinese laborers took in Wyoming were on the railroad, working for the Union Pacific company (UP) as maintenance-of-way workers. Chinese workers soon became an asset to UP, working along UP lines and in UP coal mines from Laramie to Evanston. Most Chinese workers in Wyoming ended up working in Sweetwater County, but a large number settled in Carbon and Uinta counties. Most Chinese people in the area were men working in the mines. Confusion about Chinese immigrants was widespread and largely uncontroversial at the time. Tucker, in the aforementioned 1884 article, referred to Asian immigrants as "...the Asiatic race, alien in blood, habits, and civilization". He also noted, "Chinese are the chief element in this Asiatic population."

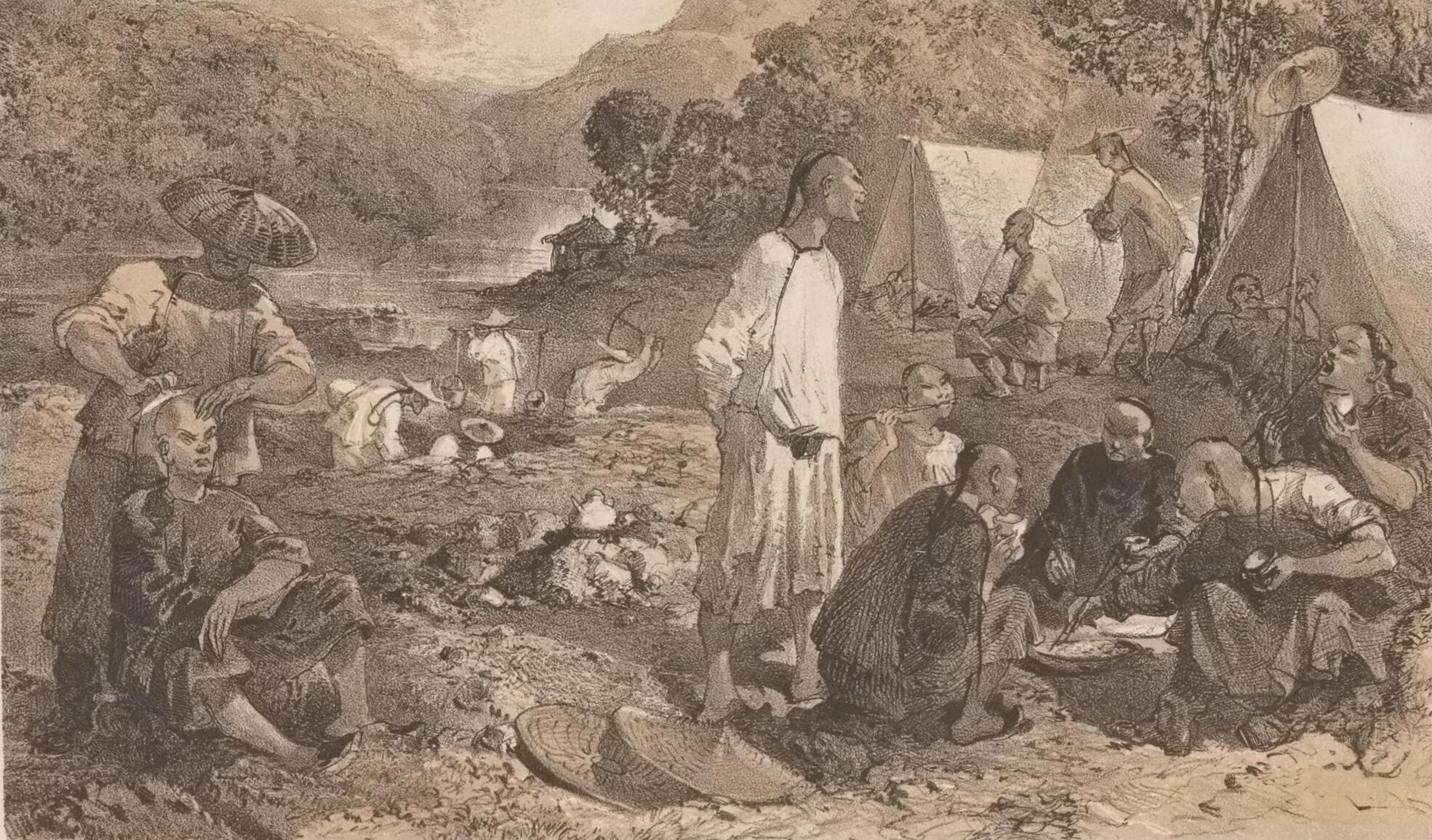
A typical 19th-century Chinese American mining camp

In 1874–75, after labor unrest disrupted coal production, the Union Pacific Coal Department hired Chinese laborers in their coal mines throughout southern Wyoming. The Chinese population rose slowly at first; however, where there were Chinese immigrants, they were generally concentrated in one area. At Red Desert, a remote section camp in Sweetwater County, there were 20 inhabitants, of whom 12 were Chinese. All twelve were laborers who worked under an American foreman. To the east of the Red Desert was another remote section camp, Washakie. An American section foreman lived there amongst twenty three others, including thirteen Chinese laborers and an Irish crew foreman. In the various section camps along the main line of the Union Pacific Railroad, Chinese workers far outnumbered other nationalities. Though the 79 Chinese in Sweetwater County in 1870 represented only 4% of the total population, they were concentrated. In Rock Springs and Green River, the largest towns along the UP line, there were no Chinese residents reported in 1870.

Throughout the 1870s, the Chinese population in Sweetwater County and all of Wyoming steadily increased. During the decade, Wyoming's total population rose from 9,118 to 20,789. In the 1870 U.S. census, what the government today calls "Asian and Pacific Islanders" represented one hundred forty three members of the population of Wyoming. The increase during the 1870s was the largest percentage increase in the Asian population of Wyoming of any decade since; the increase represented a 539% jump in the Asian population. By 1880, most Chinese residents in Sweetwater County lived in Rock Springs. At that time, Wyoming was home to 914 Asians; that number fell significantly during the 1880s to 465.

Although most Chinese workers in 1880 were employed in the coal mines around Wyoming and Sweetwater County, the Chinese in Rock Springs worked mostly in occupations outside of mining. In addition to Chinese laborers and miners, a professional gambler, a priest, a cook and a barber resided in the city. In Green River, Wyoming, there was a Chinese doctor. Chinese servants and waiters found work in Green River and in Fort Washakie. In Atlantic City, Miner's Delight, and Red Canyon, Wyoming, Chinese gold miners were employed. However, the majority of the 193 Chinese residing in Sweetwater County by 1880 worked in the coal mines or on the railroad.

== Causes ==
The riot was the result of a combination of racial prejudice and general resentment against Union Pacific. In 1882, the Chinese Exclusion Act required that "... from and after the expiration of ninety days next after the passage of this act, and until the expiration of ten years next after the passage of this act, the coming of Chinese laborers to the United States be, and the same is hereby, suspended; and during such suspension it shall not be lawful for any Chinese laborer to come." In the years preceding the Rock Springs massacre, the importation of Chinese labor was seen as a "system worse than slavery". The white miners at Rock Springs, being mostly Cornish, Irish, Swedish, and Welsh immigrants, believed lower-paid Chinese laborers drove down their wages.

The Chinese at Rock Springs were aware of the animosity and rising racial tension with other miners, but had not taken any precautions, as no prior events indicated there would be any riots. Underlying the outbreak of violence were resentment of the policies of the Union Pacific Coal Department. Until 1875, the mines in Rock Springs were worked by European Americans; in that year, a strike occurred, and the strikers were replaced with Chinese strikebreakers less than two weeks after the strike began. The company resumed mining with 50 American miners and 150 Chinese miners in its employ. As more Chinese arrived in Rock Springs, bitterness from the legacy miners increased. At the time of the massacre, there were about 150 legacy miners and 331 Chinese miners in Rock Springs.

In the two years before the massacre, a "Whitemen's Town" was established in Rock Springs. By 1883, the Knights of Labor organized a chapter in Rock Springs. The Knights were one of the major groups which spearheaded opposition to Chinese labor during the 1880s; in 1882, the Knights had worked for the passage of the Chinese Exclusion Act. No evidence has been uncovered to prove that the national Knights of Labor organization was behind the massacre at Rock Springs. In August 1885, notices were posted from Evanston to Rock Springs, demanding the expulsion of Chinese immigrants, and on the evening of September 1, 1885, one day before the violence, legacy miners in Rock Springs held a meeting about the Chinese immigrants. It was rumored that threats were made that night against the Chinese, according to immigrants then residing there.

== Massacre ==
=== Chronology ===
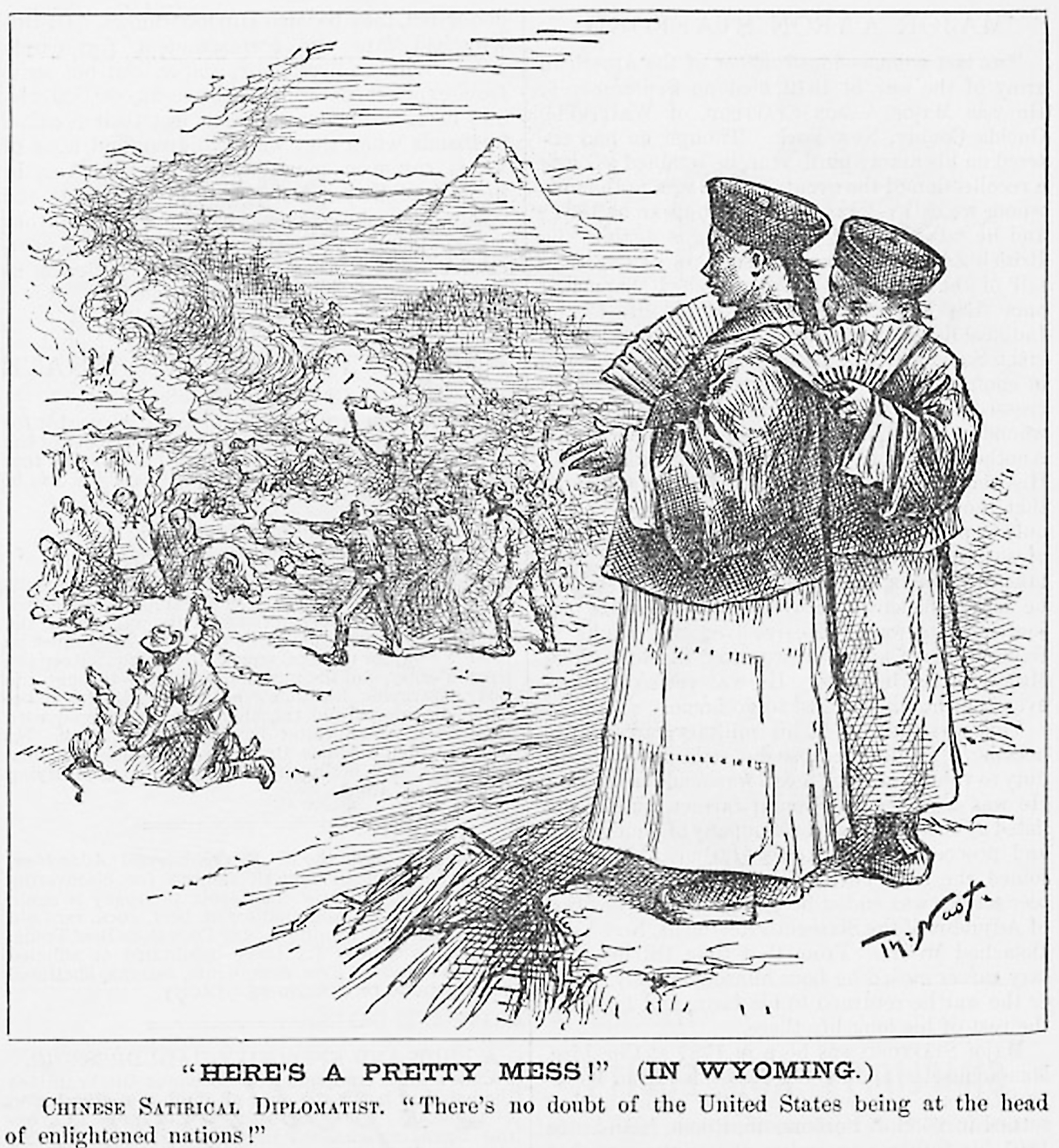
Thomas Nast's 1885 editorial cartoon applies a detail from Goya's The Third of May 1808 to the Rock Springs riot. The cartoon's caption quotes The Mikado.

At 7:00 a.m. on September 2, 1885, ten American men, in ordinary garb and miner's uniforms, arrived at coal pit number six at the Rock Springs mine. They declared that the Chinese laborers had no right to work in a particularly desirable "room" in the mine; miners were paid by the ton, thus location was important to the miners. A fight broke out, and two Chinese workers at pit number six were badly beaten. One of the Chinese workers later died due to his injuries. The American miners, most of whom were members of the Knights of Labor, walked out of the mine.

After the work stoppage at pit number six, more American miners assembled near the town. They marched to Rock Springs by way of the railroad, carrying firearms. At about 10:00 a.m., the bell in the Knights of Labor meeting hall tolled, and the miners inside the building joined the already large group. There were some miners who opted to go to saloons instead of joining the gathering mob. By 2:00 p.m. the saloons and grocers were persuaded, likely by a Union Pacific official, to close.

With the saloons and grocers closed, about 150 men armed with Winchester rifles moved toward Chinatown in Rock Springs. They moved in two groups and entered Chinatown by crossing separate bridges. The larger group entered by way of the railroad bridge and was divided into squads, a few of which remained standing on the opposite side of the bridge outside Chinatown. The smaller group entered by way of the town's plank bridge.

Squads from the larger group broke off and moved up the hill toward coal pit number three. One squad took up a position at the pit number three coal shed; another, at the pump house. A warning party was sent ahead of the squads into Chinatown. They warned the Chinese they had one hour to pack up and leave town. After only 30 minutes, the first gunshots were fired by the squad at the pump house, followed by a volley from those at the coal shed. Lor Sun Kit, a Chinese laborer, was shot and fell to the ground. As the group at coal pit number three rejoined them, the crowd pressed on toward Chinatown, some men firing their weapons as they went. The smaller group of miners at the plank bridge divided itself into squads and surrounded Chinatown. One squad stayed at the plank bridge to cut off any Chinese escape.

As the American miners moved into Chinatown, the Chinese became aware of the riot and that Leo Dye Bah and Yip Ah Marn, residents from the west and east sides of Chinatown, had already been killed. As the news of the events spread, the Chinese fled in fear and confusion. They ran in every direction: up the hill behind coal pit number three; others, along the base of the hill at coal pit number four; others still, from the eastern end of town, fled across Bitter Creek to the opposite hill; and more fled the western end of Chinatown across the base of the hill to the right of coal pit number five. The opposing group came from three directions by this time, from the east and west ends of town and from the wagon road. The Chinese immigrants present at the Rock Springs massacre presented their own grisly account of the mêlée to the Chinese consul in New York City:

Whenever the mob met a Chinese they stopped him and, pointing a weapon at him, asked him if he had any revolver, and then approaching him they searched his person, robbing him of his watch or any gold or silver that he might have about him, before letting him go. Some of the rioters would let a Chinese go after depriving him of all his gold and silver, while another Chinese would be beaten with the butt ends of the weapons before being let go. Some of the participants, when they could not stop a Chinese, would shoot him dead on the spot, and then search and rob him. Some would overtake a Chinese, throw him down and search and rob him before they would let him go. Some of the rioters would not fire their weapons, but would only use the butt ends to beat the Chinese with. Some would not beat a Chinese, but rob him of whatever he had and let him go, yelling to him to go quickly. Some, who took no part either in beating or robbing the Chinese, stood by, shouting loudly and laughing and clapping their hands.

By 3:30 p.m. the massacre was well under way. A group of women in Rock Springs had gathered at the plank bridge, where they stood and cheered on the legacy miners. Two of the women reportedly fired shots at the Chinese. As the riot wore on into the night, the Chinese miners scattered into the hills, lying in the grass to hide. Between 4 and 9 p.m., rioters set fire to the camp houses belonging to the coal company. By 9 p.m., all but one Chinese camp house was burned completely. In all, 79 Chinese homes were destroyed by fire. Damage to Chinese-owned property was estimated at $147,000.

Some Chinese died on the banks of Bitter Creek as they fled; others died near the railroad bridge as they attempted to escape Chinatown. The rioters threw Chinese bodies into the flames of burning buildings. Other Chinese immigrants, who had hidden in their houses instead of fleeing, were murdered, and then their bodies were burned with their houses. Those who could not run, including the sick, were burned alive in their camp houses. Many of the Chinese who were burned in their houses apparently tried "to dig a hole in the cellar to hide themselves. However, the fire overtook them when about half way in the hole, burning their lower limbs to a crisp and leaving the upper trunk untouched." One remaining Chinese immigrant was found dead in a laundry house in Whitemen's Town, his home demolished by rioters.

The attacks at Rock Springs were extraordinarily violent. The sheer brutality of the violence startled the entire country. Besides those who were burned alive, Chinese miners were scalped, mutilated, branded, decapitated, dismembered, and hanged from gutter spouts. One of the Chinese miners' penis and testicles were cut off and toasted in a nearby saloon as a "trophy of the hunt".

There were 28 confirmed deaths, and at least 15 miners were wounded. Some sources assert that 40 to 50 fatalities might be a more accurate number, as some of those who fled were never accounted for. The Chinese consul in New York City compiled a detailed list of the massacre's victims.

=== Names of the dead ===
==== Bodies found mutilated ====
- Leo Sun Tsung, 51: found in his hut with multiple wounds, including a bullet wound to the face
- Leo Kow Boot, 24: found between mines three and four with a bullet wound to the neck
- Yii See Yen, 36: found near Bitter Creek with a bullet wound to the temple
- Leo Dye Bah, 56: found near the plank bridge with a bullet wound to the chest

==== Bodies found burned ====
- Choo Bah Quot, 23: found in a hut adjoining Camp No. 34, partially burned
- Sia Bun Ning, 37: head, neck and shoulders found in a hut near the Chinese temple, the rest of the body had been burned off
- Leo Lung Hong, 45: upper torso found in a hut near Camp No. 27, the rest of the body was burned off
- Leo Chih Ming, 49: head and chest found in a hut, the rest of the body was burned off
- Liang Tsun Bong, 42: upper torso found in a hut, the rest of the body was burned off
- Hsu Ah Cheong, 32: skull found in a hut, no other remains were available
- Lor Han Lung, 32: sole and heel of left foot found in a hut near Camp No. 34
- Hoo Ah Nii, 43: right half of head and backbone found in a hut
- Leo Tse Wing, 39: lower half bones found in a hut near Camp No. 14

==== Bone fragments only or no bodies found ====
- Leo Jew Foo, 35
- Leo Tim Kwong, 31
- Hung Qwan Chuen, 42
- Tom He Yew, 34
- Mar Tse Choy
- Leo Lung Siang
- Yip Ah Marn
- Leo Lung Hon
- Leo Lung Hor
- Leo Ah Tsun
- Leang Ding
- Leo Hoy Yat
- Yuen Chin Sing
- Hsu Ah Tseng
- Chun Quan Sing

== Outcome ==
=== Immediate aftermath ===
In the days following the riot, surviving Chinese immigrants in Rock Springs fled and were picked up by Union Pacific trains. By September 5, almost all survivors were in Evanston, Wyoming, 100 miles (160 km) west of Rock Springs. Once there, they were subjected to threats of murder and other crimes; Evanston was another area in Wyoming where anti-Chinese sentiment was high.

Rumors of the return of the Chinese to Rock Springs circulated immediately after the riots. On September 3, the Rock Springs Independent published an editorial which confirmed the rumors of "the return", as a few Chinese began to trickle back into town to search for valuables. The Independent said of the return of Chinese laborers to Rock Springs, "It means that Rock Springs is killed, as far as White men are concerned, if such program is carried out." The massacre was defended in the local newspaper, and, to an extent, in other western newspapers. In general, however, Wyoming newspapers disapproved of the acts of the massacre while supporting the cause of the original miners.

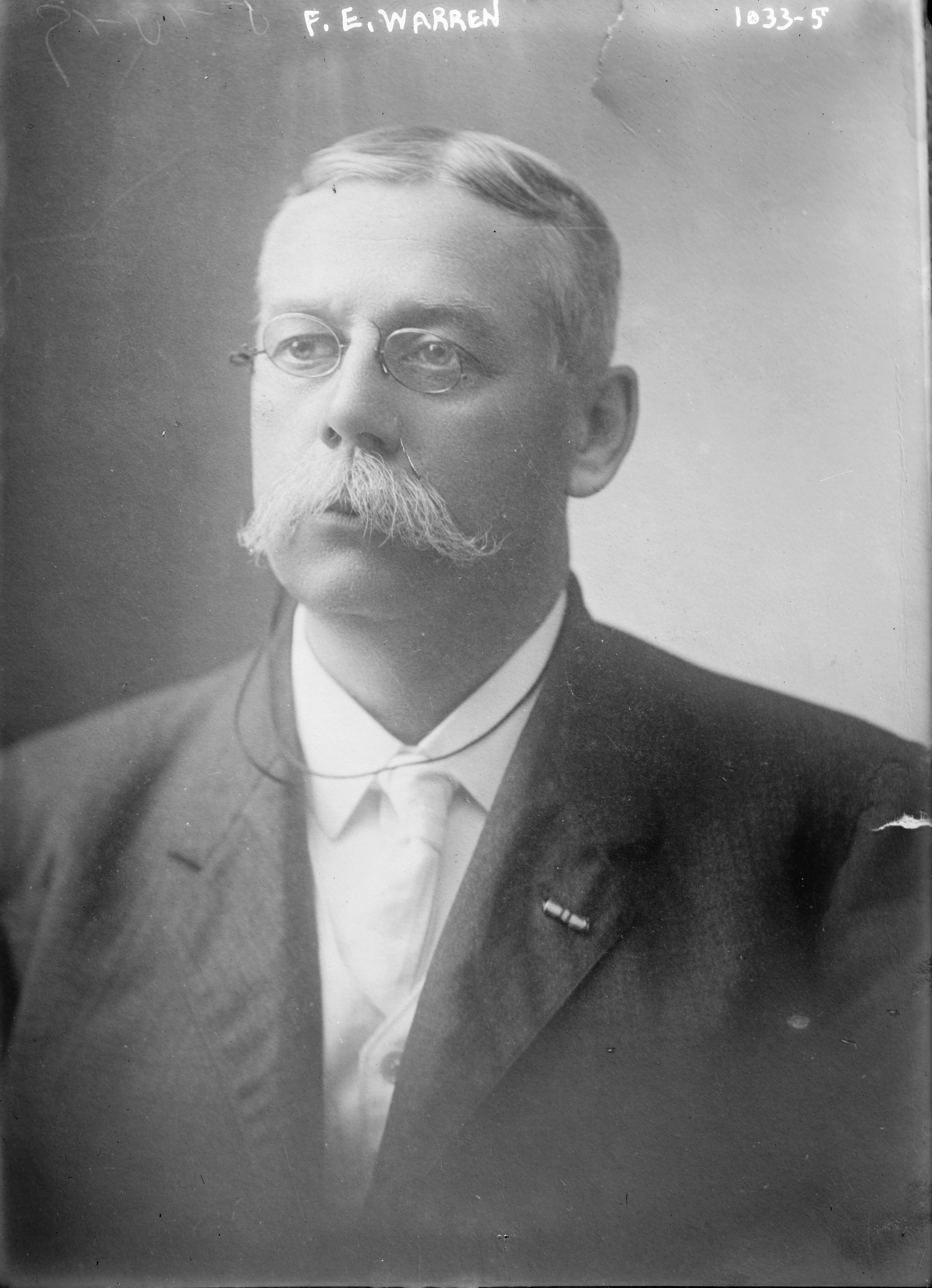
Wyoming territorial Governor Francis E. Warren appealed to U.S. president Grover Cleveland for federal troops in Rock Springs.

Wyoming's territorial Governor Francis E. Warren visited Rock Springs on September 3, 1885, the day after the riot, to make a personal assessment. After his trip to Rock Springs, Warren traveled to Evanston, where he sent telegrams to U.S. President Grover Cleveland appealing for federal troops. Back in Rock Springs, the riot had calmed, but the situation was still unstable. Two companies of the United States Army's 7th Infantry arrived on September 5, 1885. One company, under the command of a Lieutenant Colonel Anderson, was stationed in Evanston, Wyoming; the other, under a Colonel Chipman, was stationed in Rock Springs. At Camp Murray, Utah Territory, Colonel Alexander McDowell McCook was ordered to augment the garrison sent to Wyoming with six more companies.

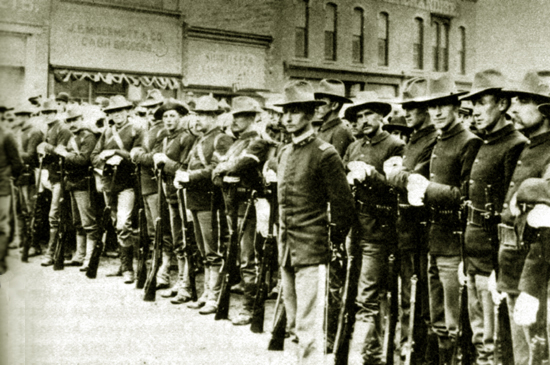
Federal soldiers on South Front Street in Rock Springs, 1885. Troops were first deployed in Rock Springs to quell the riot on September 5.

On September 9, 1885, one week after the massacre, six companies of soldiers arrived in Wyoming. Four of the six companies then escorted the Chinese back to Rock Springs. Once back in Rock Springs, the Chinese laborers found scorched tracts of land where their homes once stood. The mining company had buried only a few dead; others remained lying in the open, mangled, decomposing, and partially eaten by dogs, hogs, or other animals.

The situation in Rock Springs was stabilized as early as September 15, when Warren first requested the removal of federal troops, but the mines at Rock Springs remained closed for a time. On September 30, 1885, White miners, mostly Finnish immigrants who were members of the Knights of Labor, walked out of mines in Carbon County, Wyoming, in protest of the company's continued use of Chinese miners. In Rock Springs, the White miners were not back at work in late September, because the company still used Chinese labor. Rock Springs steadily became quieter, and, on October 5, 1885, emergency troops, except for two companies, were removed. However, the temporary posts of Camp Medicine Butte, established in Evanston, and of Camp Pilot Butte, in Rock Springs, remained long after the riot. Camp Pilot Butte closed in 1899 after the onset of the Spanish–American War.

The labor strike was unsuccessful, and the miners went back to work within a couple of months. The national Knights of Labor organization refused to support the Carbon strike and the hold out by White miners in Rock Springs following the Rock Springs Riot. The organization avoided supporting the miners along the Union Pacific Railroad, because it did not want to be seen as condoning the violence at Rock Springs. When the Union Pacific Coal Department reopened the mines, it fired 45 White miners connected to the violence.

=== Arrests ===
After the riot in Rock Springs, sixteen men were arrested, including Isaiah Washington, a member-elect to the territorial legislature. The men were taken to jail in Green River, where they were held until after a Sweetwater County grand jury refused to bring indictments. In explaining its decision, the grand jury declared that there was no cause for legal action, stating, in part: "We have diligently inquired into the occurrence at Rock Springs. ... [T]hough we have examined a large number of witnesses, no one has been able to testify to a single criminal act committed by any known white person that day."

Those arrested as suspects in the riot were released a little more than a month later, on October 7, 1885. On their release, they were met "by several hundred men, women and children, and treated to a regular ovation", according to The New York Times. The defendants in the Rock Springs case enjoyed the same broad community consent that lynch mobs often received. No person or persons were ever convicted in the violence at Rock Springs.

=== Diplomatic and political issues ===
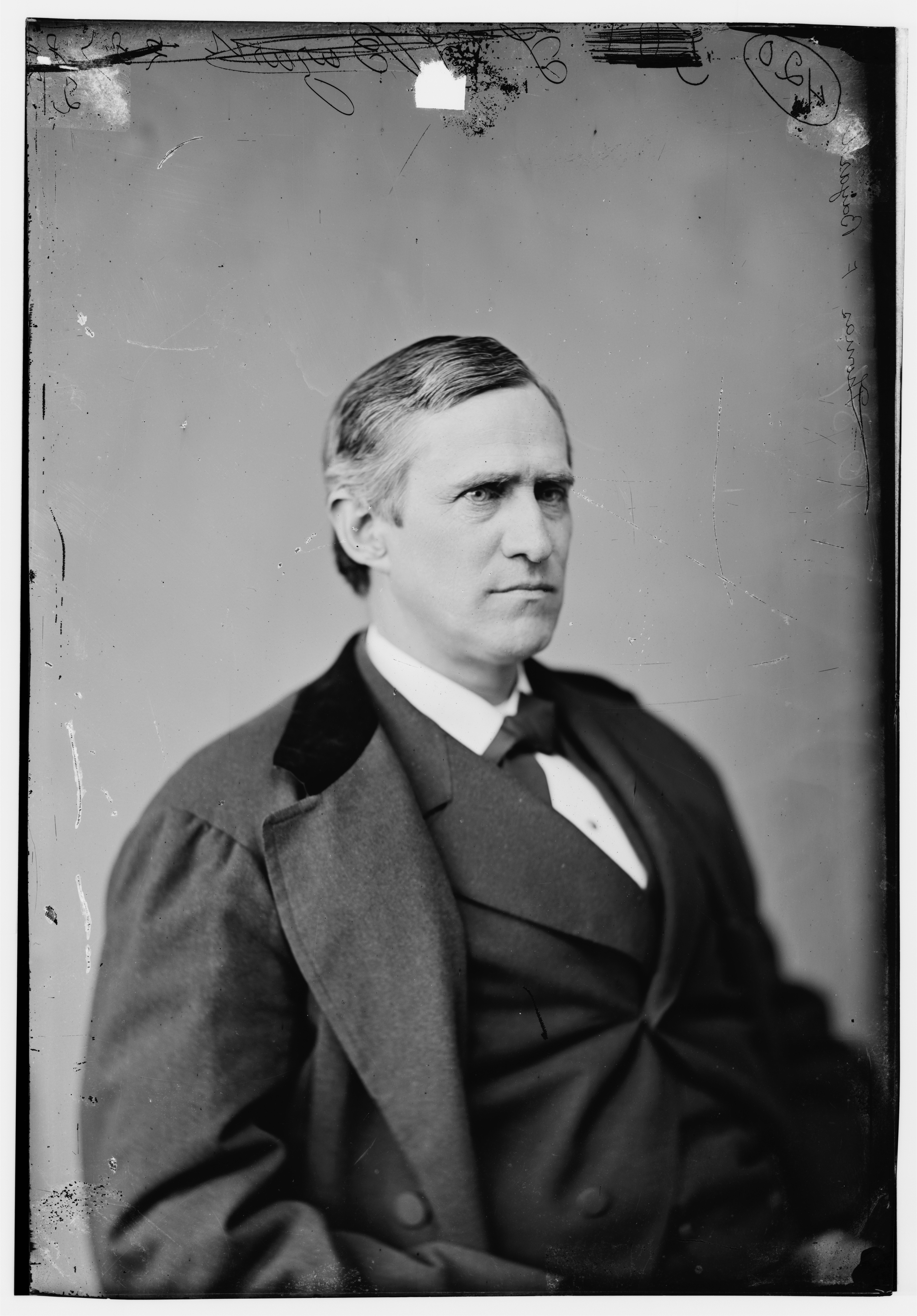
U.S. Secretary of State Thomas F. Bayard urged the U.S. Congress to indemnify the Chinese victims.

After the riot, the U.S. government hesitated to make amends to the Chinese for the massacre. In China, the governor-general of the Guangdong region suggested that Americans in China might be the target of revenge for the events in Rock Springs. The American envoy to China, Charles Harvey Denby, and others in the diplomatic corps reported rising anti-American sentiment in Hong Kong and in Canton, Guangdong, following the riot. American diplomats warned their government that the backlash from the massacre could ruin U.S. trade with China; they also reported that British merchants and newspapers in China were encouraging the Chinese to "stand up for their oppressed countrymen in America." Denby advised that U.S. Secretary of State Thomas Bayard obtain compensation for the victims of the massacre.

The United States government agreed to pay compensation for the damaged property but not for the actual victims of the massacre, although Bayard was inclined to resist the requests for payments. In a letter to the minister of China's Washington legation dated February 18, 1886, he expressed a personal view that the violence against Chinese immigrants was precipitated by their resistance to cultural assimilation, and that racism against Chinese was typically found among other immigrants rather than the majority of the populace:

Chinese immigrants ... segregate themselves from the rest of the residents and citizens of the United States and ... refuse to mingle with the mass of population ... As a consequence, race prejudice has been more excited against them, notably among aliens of other nationalities ...

Denby's predictions caused Bayard to seek a Congressionally appropriated indemnity. At Bayard's urging, the U.S. Congress provided US$147,748.74 as an indemnity. The compensation was made as a monetary gift and not as a legal decree of responsibility for the massacre and the outcome amounted to a minor diplomatic victory for China.

Correspondence between Wyoming's territorial governor, Francis Warren, and Union Pacific officials during Warren's term in office indicate that he petitioned the company for years to clear the titles on land he owned. He condemned the riot as "the most brutal and damnable outrage that ever occurred in any country."

=== Reaction ===
After the riot, rhetoric and reaction came from publications and key political figures concerning the events. The New York Times blasted the city of Rock Springs in the first of at least two editorials on the topic, stating, "the appropriate fate for a community of this kind would be that of Sodom and Gomorrah". In another Times editorial on November 10, 1885, the paper continued to assail not only the residents of Rock Springs who were involved in the violence, but those who stood by and let the mob continue its behavior. Newspapers in Wyoming, such as the Cheyenne Tribune and the Laramie Boomerang, reacted with sympathy toward the white miners. The Boomerang stated it "regretted" the riot but found extenuating circumstances surrounding the violence.

In addition to newspapers, anti-Chinese sentiment and stereotypes came from other publications. The Chautauquan: A Weekly Newsmagazine characterized the Chinese as weak and defenseless, stating in its coverage of the massacre: "To murder an industrious Chinaman is the same kind of fiendish work as the murder of women and children – it is equally a violation of the rights of the defenceless."

Knights of Labor leader Terence Powderly wrote in a letter to W. W. Stone (excerpts of which he included in a report to the U.S. Congress) that, "It is not necessary for me to speak of the numerous reasons given for the opposition to this particular race – their habits, religion, customs and practices ..." Powderly blamed the "problem" of Chinese immigration on the failings of the 1882 Exclusion Act. He faulted lax law enforcement, not those involved in the riots, for the attacks at Rock Springs. Powderly wrote that the U.S. Congress should stop "winking at violations of this statute" and reform the laws which barred Chinese immigration, which he believed could have prevented incidents such as "the recent assault upon the Chinese at Rock Springs".

In December 1885, U.S. President Grover Cleveland presented his State of the Union report to Congress, and in it, his reaction to the Rock Springs massacre. Cleveland's report pointed out that the United States was interested in good relations with China. He stated, "All of the power of this government should be exhorted to maintain the amplest good faith towards China in the treatment of these men, and the inflexible sternness of the law ... must be insisted upon ... race prejudice is the chief factor to originating these disturbances".

== Post-massacre violence ==
The massacre at Rock Springs led to other incidents of anti-Chinese aggression, primarily in Washington Territory, though there were incidents in Oregon and other states as well. Near Newcastle, Washington a mob of Whites burned down the barracks of 36 Chinese coal miners. Throughout the Puget Sound area, Chinese workers were driven out of communities and subject to violence in Washington cities and towns, including Tacoma (in the Tacoma riot of 1885), Seattle, Newcastle, and Issaquah. Chinese workers were driven out of other Washington towns, but sources indicated, as early as 1891, that the above events were specifically connected to the wave of violence touched off at Rock Springs.

The wave of anti-Chinese violence in the western United States following the Rock Springs Riot spread further, to the state of Oregon. Mobs drove Chinese workers out of small towns throughout the state in late 1885 and mid-1886. Other states reported incidents as well: As far away as Augusta, Georgia, anger was expressed against the Chinese in response to the massacre at Rock Springs. According to The New York Times, the rioting in Rock Springs fueled the desire of anti-Chinese Georgians in Augusta to air their grievances.

== Significance and context ==
The Rock Springs massacre was seen by observers at the time, and by historians today, as one of the worst and most significant instance of anti-Chinese sentiment in the United States. The riot received widespread media coverage from publications such as The National Police Gazette and The New York Times. Among the events of anti-Chinese violence in the American west, the Rock Springs massacre is considered the most widely publicized.

Today, nearly all historians hold the view that the prime factor which contributed to the riot was race prejudice. A 1990 work on the Rock Springs massacre, written by journalist Craig Storti, marginalized the racial factor and put a stronger emphasis on the economic factors which contributed to violence. His book, Incident at Bitter Creek: The Rock Springs Massacre, was widely criticized in reviews, though Storti stated he represented the historical record as it stood. There were labor considerations that contributed to the violence in Rock Springs, though they are generally seen as less significant. The use of Chinese workers by the railroad during an 1875 strike created widespread resentment among the White miners, which continued to build until the Rock Springs massacre. Storti's book described anti-Chinese racism as "pervasive" even while downplaying its significance to the riot. The view that the Chinese refused to assimilate into American culture was held historically and still carries some weight in present-day interpretations of the historical record.

== Location ==
Camp Pilot Butte was located on the north bank of Bitter Creek, in the northwest part of the city of Rock Springs. The camp covered 5 1/2 acres (2.2 ha) of Union Pacific property; the parade ground was in the center of a present-day city block bounded by Soulsby Street on the west, Pilot Butte Avenue on the east, Bridger Avenue on the north and Elias Avenue on its south. In 1973, the area where the army post once existed was listed on the U.S. National Register of Historic Places as a historic district. At that time, there were only two remaining original structures. The two buildings were owned by the Saints Cyril and Methodius Catholic Church in Rock Springs. The buildings are no longer extant, and the property is no longer listed on the National Register. The area that was once Chinatown, just north of where Camp Pilot Butte once stood, had a public elementary school built over part of it. In general, the locations in Rock Springs associated with the massacre have been surrounded and absorbed by the city's growth.

== See also ==
- Lynching of Asian Americans
