= Cherokee Trail =

Historic overland trail in the U.S.

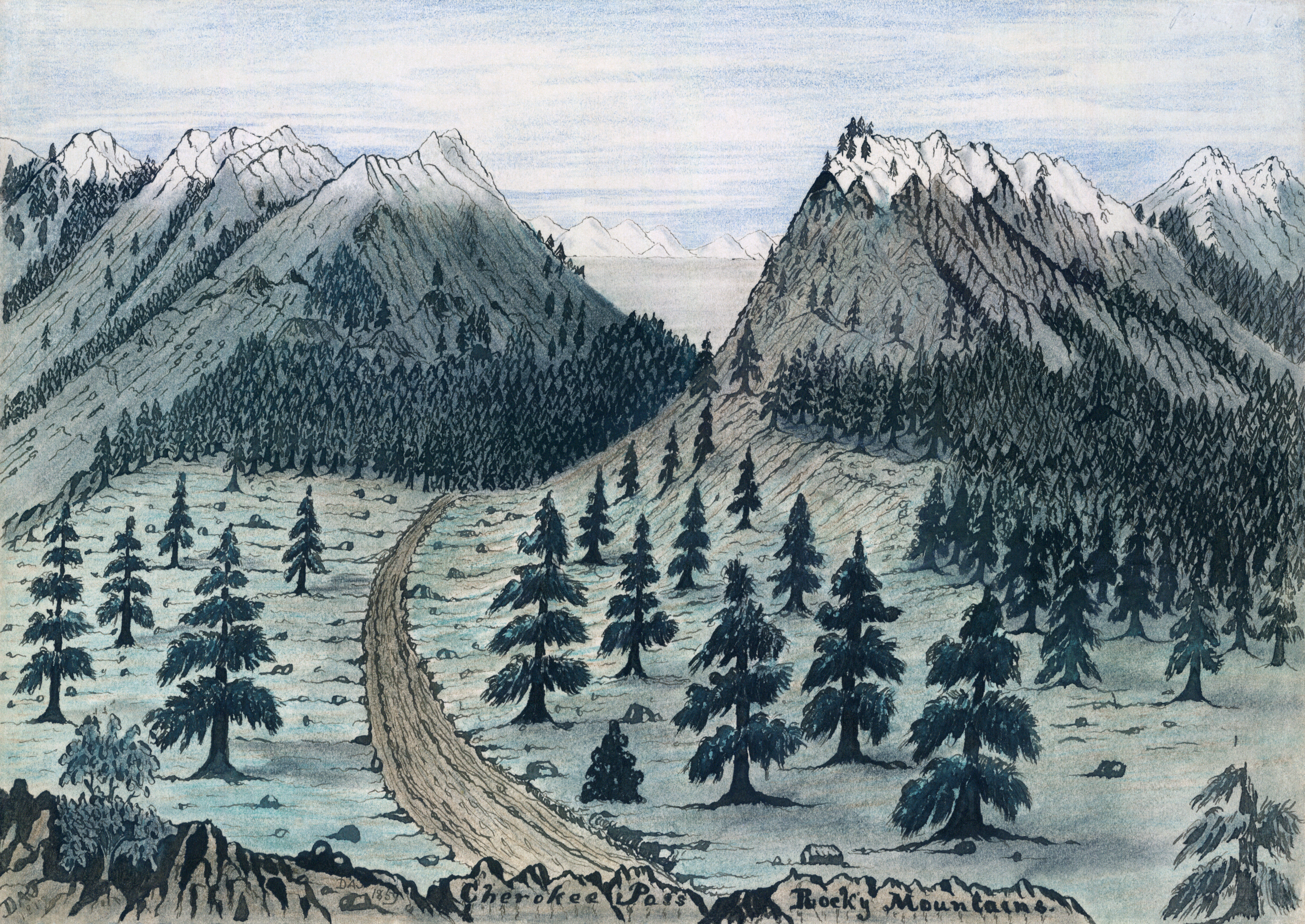
Cherokee Trail near Fort Collins, Colorado, from a sketch taken 7 June 1859.

The Cherokee Trail was a historic overland trail through the present-day U.S. states of Oklahoma, Kansas, Colorado, and Wyoming that was used from the late 1840s up through the early 1890s. The route was established in 1849 by a wagon train headed to the gold fields in California. Among the members of the expedition were a group of Cherokee. When the train formed in Indian Territory, Lewis Evans of Evansville, Arkansas, was elected Captain. Thus, this expedition is sometimes written as the Evans/Cherokee Train. In 1850 four wagon trains turned west on the Laramie Plains, along Wyoming's southern border to Fort Bridger.

According to one source, "Neither the number of wagons nor the number of people that eventually used this road to cross the Sierra Madres makes this trail significant. What makes this road unique is that Native Americans and their traveling companions did not just cross the Continental Divide; they made a path over the mountains and through the Wyoming Basin."

The trail was also known as the Trappers' Trail, but the Trapper's Trail from 1820 took a different route in Wyoming and had a southerly branch from Taos, New Mexico.

== Route description ==
The route originated in Grand River near present-day Salina, Oklahoma. (Note: Some sources say the origin was in the area of Fort Gibson and Talequah, (then in Indian Territory, but now in the state of Oklahoma) and extended over 900 miles (1,400 km) to Fort Bridger, Wyoming.)

According to Erb, Brown, and Hughes, "The Cherokee Trail came west out of Oklahoma along the Arkansas River Valley in Colorado to the mouth of Black Squirrel Creek, a tributary of Cherry Creek (Colorado), following the latter to the South Platte River. It went on north along the eastern base of the Rockies to the Cache la Poudre in the vicinity of Laporte and Virginia Dale then over to the Laramie Plains." The name of the trail originated from the 1849 trek to California of 130 Cherokees, with their 40 wagons, led by Captain Lewis Evans.

== History ==
Parts of this trail had been traveled and reported earlier in the 19th century. According to Gardner, General William Ashley had used part of this route as early as 1824. Gardner also mentions that emigrants heading for Oregon wrote about the routes in and out of Browns Park in 1839. (Note: Browns Park, also called "Browns Hole," is an isolated valley on the Utah-Colorado border near the extreme northwestern border of present-day Colorado. It seems to have served as a landmark in several accounts describing the Cherokee Trail.) By 1849, three routes suitable for crossing the Continental Divide had been identified: Twin Groves, Wyoming, an unnamed location near present-day Rawlings, Wyoming and Bridger's Pass. The Cherokee Trail followed the Twin Groves route. (Note: According to the Topozone website, Twin Groves is now the site of Twin Groves Reservoir in Carbon County, Wyoming (Coordinates 41.3591276°N, -107.164776°W).)

The outlaw L. H. Musgrove traveled on the Cherokee Trail from Colorado into Wyoming during the 1860s. A native of Mississippi, he came to California at the time of the Gold Rush. Apparently deciding that crime was more profitable than panning for gold, he was arrested and charged with murder in Fort Halleck, Wyoming, during 1863. Taken to Denver for trial, he was released on an unexplained technicality, and returned to a life of crime. Musgrove assembled a network of horse thieves known as the Musgrove Gang, who raided government posts and wagon trains along the Colorado Front Range, following the Cherokee Trail. Musgrove was finally captured and taken to jail in Denver. He started a rumor from his cell that friends were planning to help him escape, and that the citizens could not prevent this. Instead, a group of vigilantes demanded that the guards release Musgrove to them. The guards offered no resistance, so the vigilantes took possession of the prisoner. Quickly they moved him to the Larimer Street bridge and ended his criminal career by hanging him beneath the bridge on November 23, 1868.

== Sources ==
- Fletcher, Patricia K. A., Jack E. Fletcher, Lee Whiteley, "Cherokee Trail Diaries New Routes to the California Gold Rush Vol 1 1849, Vol II 1850." Sequim, WA Fletcher Family Trust, 1999.
- Fletcher, Dr. Jack E., Patricia K.A. Fletcher, "Cherokee Trail Diaries Emigrants, Goldseekers, Cattle Drives and Outlaws 1851-1900, Vol III" Sequim, WA Fletcher Family Trust, 2001.
- Marcy, Randolph B., Capt. US Army. The Prairie Traveler. New York: Harper & Brothers, 1859. (retrieved from The Kansas Collection August 18, 2006).
- Dictionary of American History by James Truslow Adams, New York: Charles Scribner's Sons, 1940
- Whiteley, Lee. The Cherokee Trail: Bent's Old Fort to Fort Bridger
- Gehling, Richard. "Colorado's Cherokee Trail'.
