= Laramie Plains =

Coordinates: 41°14′17″N 105°44′53″W

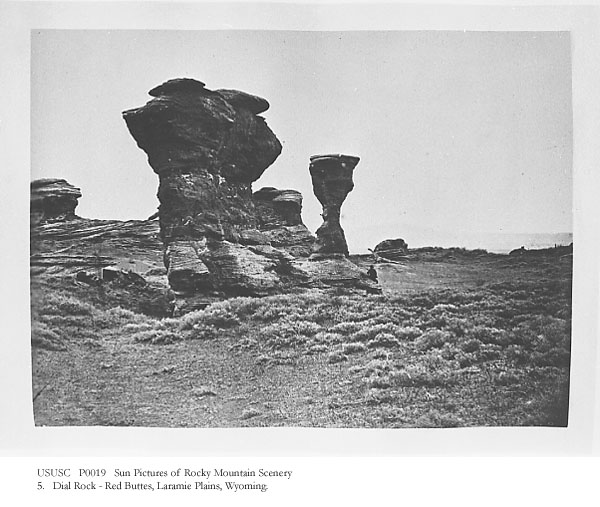
Red Buttes, Laramie Plains, ca. 1869

The Laramie Plains is an arid highland at an elevation of approx. 8,000 feet (2,400 m) in south central Wyoming in the United States. The plains extend along the upper basin of the Laramie River on the east side of the Medicine Bow Range. The city of Laramie is the largest community in the valley. The plains are separated from the Great Plains to the east by the Laramie Mountains, a spur of the Front Range that extends northward from Larimer County, Colorado west of Cheyenne. The high altitude of the region makes for a cold climate and a relatively short growing season. Unsuitable to most cultivation, the plains have historically been used for livestock raising, primarily of sheep and cattle.

== Geography ==
In 1842 and 1843 John Charles Fremont explored in Wyoming and submitted reports and maps to Congress afterward. He apparently followed local usage and labeled the plains surrounded by mountains in southeast Wyoming “Laramie Plains.” His 1842 map used the term twice at the northern and southern extremes: just south of the Laramie Mountains near Red Buttes (roughly ten miles south of Laramie) in the north and straddling the Laramie River not far from the future site of Laramie in the south. In 1843 he camped on Laramie Plains, at the base of Elk Mountain. This usage was followed in subsequent commercial maps such as the 1876 Rand McNally, and finally the U.S. Geologic Survey’s Geographic Names Committee adopted the name in June 2004.

== History ==
The Laramie Plains in the 19th century were not occupied by any one tribe but instead utilized by the Northern Arapaho, Northern Cheyenne, Oglala Sioux, Eastern Shoshone, and White River Utes. Sources state that the Laramie Plains “fell outside what would be considered the home territories of the tribes that used it.”. The territories of these tribes abutted on the Plains. Francis Parkman relates in his book, The Oregon Trail, how he accompanied a band of Oglala on a buffalo hunt on The Plains in 1846, recording their fears of war parties. He was told that a ten-man Oglala war party led by the son of the band's chief was wiped out there near the Laramie Mountains in 1845 by a Shoshone war party ranging almost into Sioux territory.

The plains also furnished a convenient transportation route through the region for trails that ascended through the mountains along the Cache la Poudre River, such as the Cherokee Trail, by which Cherokee from Indian Territory (Oklahoma) traveled to California.

Captain Howard Stansbury, U.S. Army Topographical Engineer, was exploring a route back from the Great Salt Lake over Laramie Plains in the summer of 1849 when his party encountered stampeding buffalo near the present city of Laramie, which was taken to be a sign of Indian hunters. His guide, the celebrated mountain man Jim Bridger, walked out to meet with them and negotiate in sign language, learning they were Sioux and feared Stansbury’s party might be Crow warriors. The Sioux invited Bridger and Stansbury to their village camped nearby for a feast. At the end of his exploration, Stansbury recommended the route from Fort Bridger in western Wyoming through Laramie Plains to the forks of the Platte (just west of modern North Platte, Nebraska), which later became part of the Overland Trail and Overland Stage Line.

East-West communications – the Pony Express, the transcontinental telegraph line, and the transcontinental stage line carrying the mails – followed the Oregon Trail to Fort Laramie and over South Pass until 1862, when Indian attacks forced the stage line to reroute to the Overland Trail. A detachment of soldiers from Fort Laramie cut across The Plains and built Fort Halleck at the base of Elk Mountain to protect the line.

In 1868 the plains were traversed by the route of the Union Pacific Railroad as part of the First transcontinental railroad. The building of the railroad caused a boom in the valley population, with the establishment of "Laramie City", which later became the site of the University of Wyoming. U.S. Highway 30, an all-weather route from coast-to-coast, was built along the railroad and was known as the Lincoln Highway. Today, Interstate 80 also follows the Overland Trail, coming very close to the site of Fort Halleck (Wyoming) near Fremont’s 1843 campsite at the base of Elk Mountain.

== See also ==
- North Park
