= Fort Sanders (Wyoming) =

- U.S. National Register of Historic Places
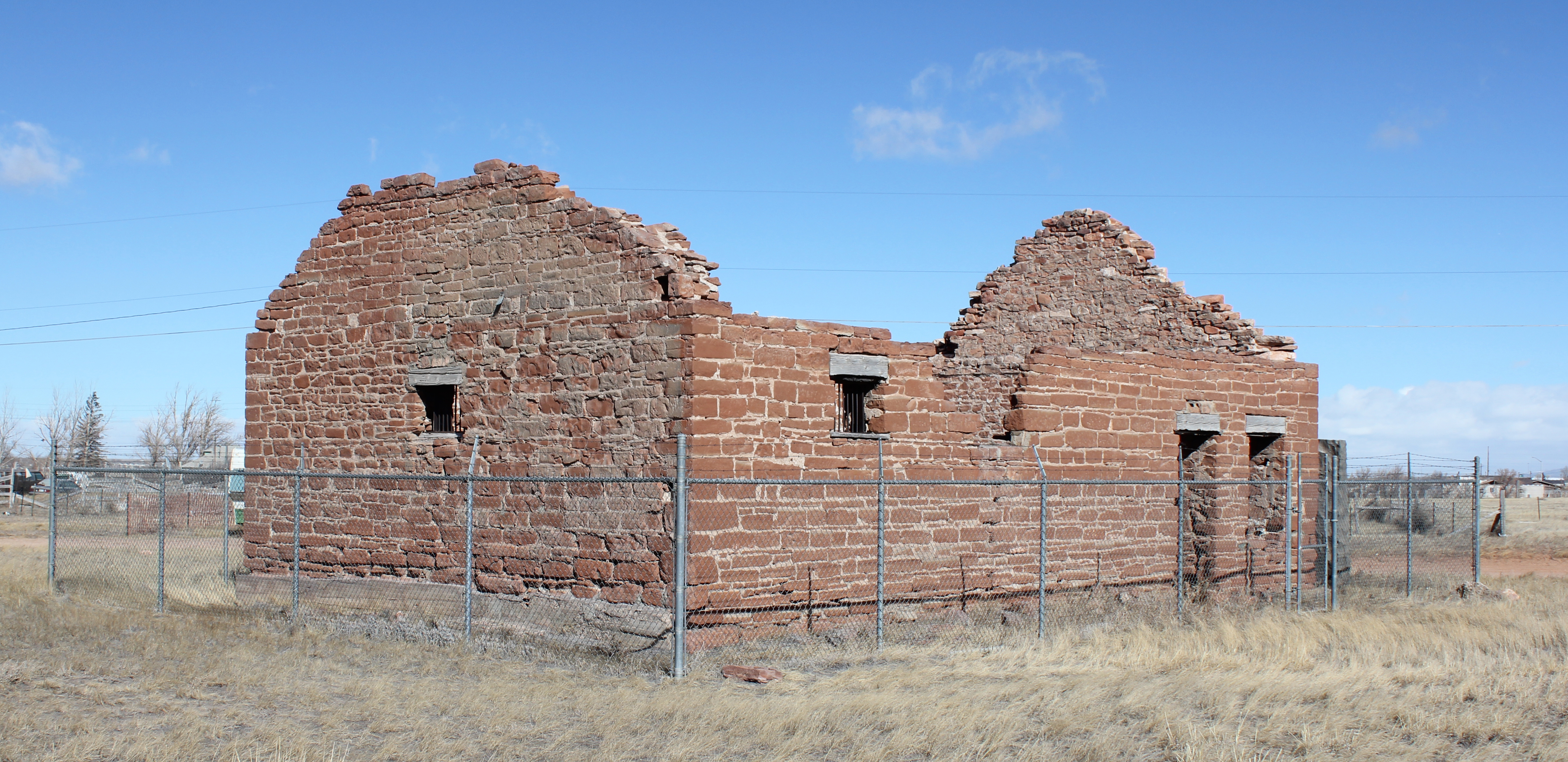
- The guardhouse in 2014.

- Location within Wyoming Location within the United States
- Location: Albany County, Wyoming, USA
- Nearest city: Laramie, Wyoming
- Coordinates: 41°16′9″N 105°35′41″W
- NRHP reference No.: 80004300
- Added to NRHP: May 1, 1980

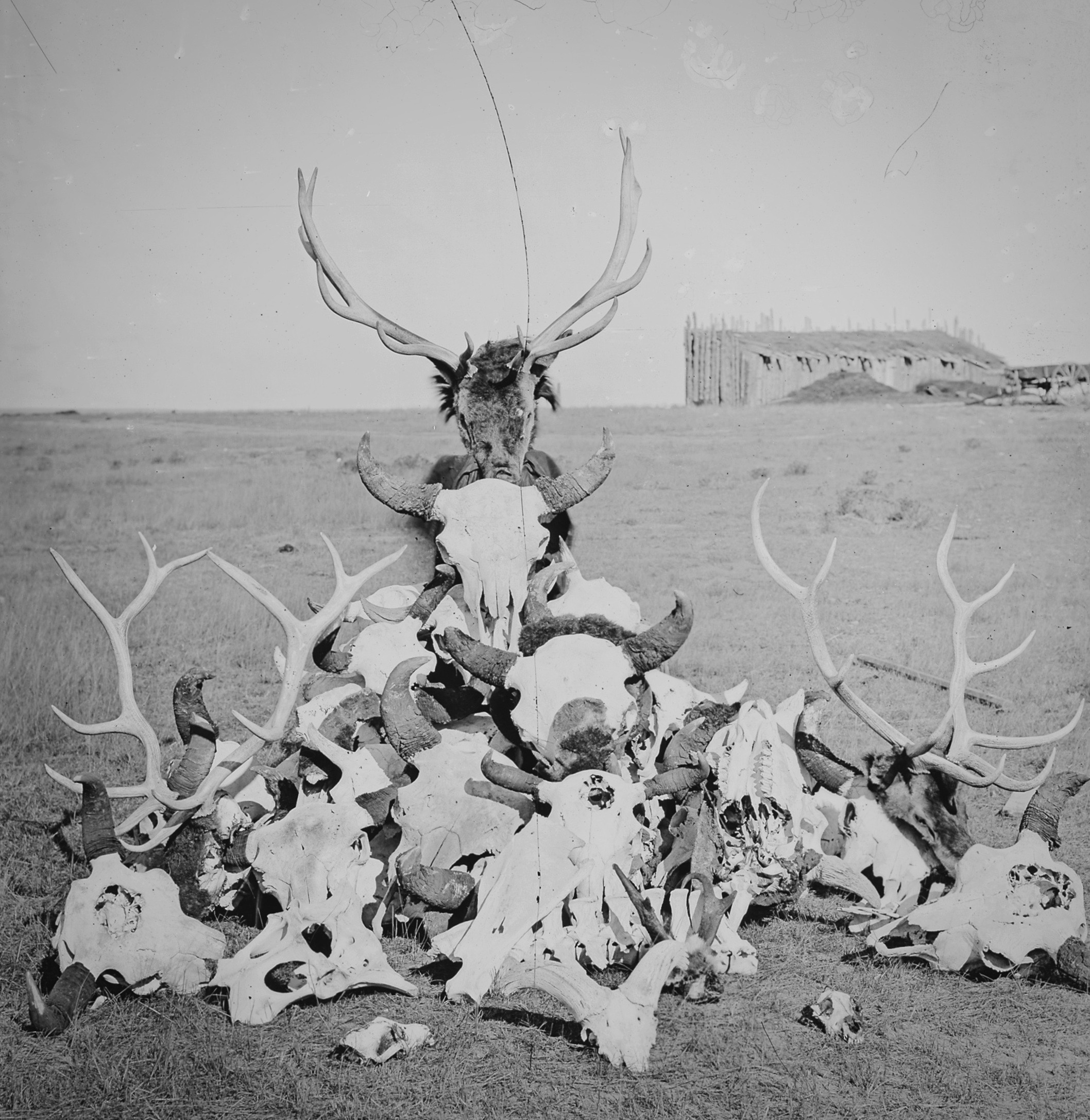
Buffalo, elk, pronghorn, deer, mountain sheep and wolf skulls and bones at Fort Sanders, 1870. Photo by William Henry Jackson.

Fort Sanders was a wooden fort constructed in 1866 on the Laramie Plains in southern Wyoming, near the city of Laramie. Originally named Fort John Buford, it was renamed Fort Sanders after General William P. Sanders, who died at the Siege of Knoxville during the American Civil War. This was the second fort to be named after Sanders, the first being in Knoxville, Tennessee. The fort was originally intended to protect travelers on the nearby Overland Trail from Indian attacks, but later the garrison was tasked with protecting the workers of the Union Pacific railroad when it arrived in the spring of 1868. In 1869 the town of Laramie (originally called "Laramie City") was created about 3 miles (4.8 km) north of the fort. Fort Sanders became less important following the construction of Fort D. A. Russell in Cheyenne in 1868, but the War Department maintained it until 1882 when the buildings were sold.

== Layout ==
The fort grounds were 223 feet (68 m) by 400 feet (122 m), including a parade ground. The post was originally built for four companies, but was later expanded to accommodate six. Nearly all of the buildings were constructed of wood except for the stone guardhouse, which was built in 1869 and remains the only structure standing on the original site today. At least two additional buildings from the fort were moved to other locations in Laramie and survive today. The post Commander's quarters were moved to LaBonte Park and have been used as community center, and since 2010 the headquarters of the nonprofit food access organization Feeding Laramie Valley. Another building became the Cavalrymen Supper Club.

== See also ==
- List of the oldest buildings in Wyoming
