= Bridger family of Virginia =

Notable family in American history

The Bridger family of Virginia is notable to American history. Relevant figures include Joseph Bridger and Jim Bridger, as well as some less-known contributors to American colonial, pioneer, and Civil War history.

== Joseph Bridger ==
The foremost progenitor of this family was General Joseph Bridger of Isle of Wight County, Virginia. Originally from Gloucester, England, he served, according to some sources, as a co-acting Colonial Governor of Virginia in 1684 and 1685.

== Jim Bridger ==
The most well-known member of the Bridger family is Jim Bridger, mountain man, and explorer of the American Northwest (primarily Montana and Wyoming). Many places are named for him, such as the Bridger Mountains of Montana and the Bridger Mountains of Wyoming, as well as the Bridger-Teton National Forest and Bridger Wilderness, both in western Wyoming.

== Others ==
The Bridger family also includes several other members of historical relevance. James and John Bridger, for whom Bridger Mountain (a ridge in West Virginia) was named, were pioneer settlers of Pocahontas County, West Virginia.

Robert Rufus Bridgers, a member of the North Carolina legislature, represented the state in the First and Second Confederate Congress. "Bridger's Artillery" was among the Confederate companies of Hedrick's Brigade, which helped defend Fort Anderson in February 1865, as part of the Battle of Wilmington. In addition, William Bridgers, of Austin, Texas, was a significant photographer of the Civil War era.

Luther B. Bridgers (1884–1948), an American songwriter and Methodist minister, was noted for his evangelism.

== See also ==
- Bridger (name)
- Bridgers
