= Little Owl (Arapaho chief) =

Beah-at-sah-ah-tch-che, known commonly as Little Owl was a Northern Arapaho chief who signed the Treaty of Fort Laramie (1851). Disturbed by the ways in which the United States government neglected to honor their promises made in the treaty, Little Owl refused to participate in discussion and signing of the Fort Wise Treaty.

== Life ==
Little Owl was chief of the Long Legs band of the Northern Arapaho people. His relative, Sherman Sage, a later elder, described life among his family. People lived in family groups, generally of groupings of sisters. There were generally four bands of northern Arapaho: the Beavers, Greasy Faces, the Quick-to-anger, and the Long Legs or Antelopes. They lived a hunter-gatherer lifestyle who moved together in groups throughout the seasons. They gathered with other groups for hunting and ceremonies, like the Sun Dance. There was one chief for each band and a head chief, usually of the Long Legs band. The head chief negotiated with leaders of other Native American tribes and whites. The head chief "possessed great influence over the whole; that his mandates were uniformly characterized by discretion and propriety, and were regarded by his subjects as inviolable laws." Little Owl followed Bear Claw as head chief. Little Owl's successor was Medicine Man.

== Fort Laramie Treaty of 1851 ==
Little Owl, a friendly middle-aged chief, was selected as the Arapaho head chief to sign the Treaty of Fort Laramie (1851). From the South Arapaho were Cute Nose and Big Man. Autho-nishah, an elder of the Arapaho nation, urged Little Owl and other signers to make a moral commitment to honor the provisions of the treaty. He said, "the Great Spirit is over us, and sees us all." Little Owl was respected by the white people who knew him. During negotiations, Little Owl and other Arapaho presented their positions with a conciliatory tone, as opposed to the Sioux, who gave "begging speeches". Little Owl wore a uniform of a high-ranking officer that was a gift from the United States government. The uniform identified him as a powerful Arapaho. Big Man and Little Owl signed the amended treaty for the Arapaho on August 31, 1853. Upon signing the treaty, the Northern Arapaho were a federally recognized tribe.

== Broken promises ==
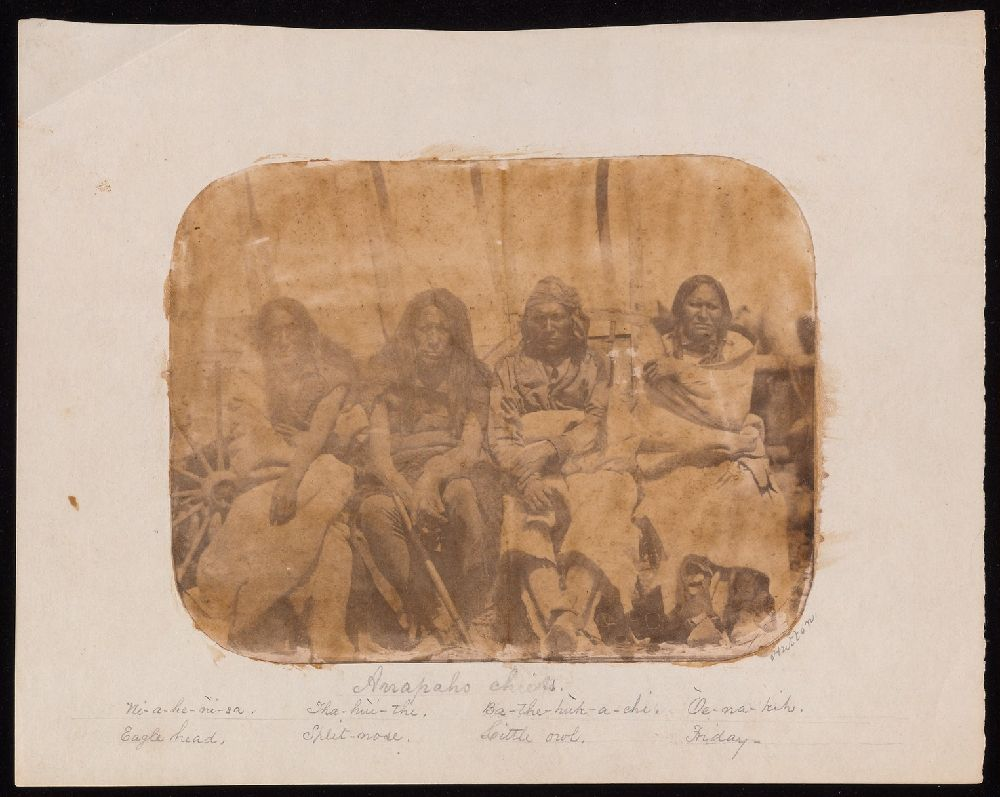
Arapaho chiefs Eagle Head, Split-nose, Little Owl, and Friday by James D. Hutton, during the Raynolds expedition of 1859-1860

After 1851, Friday became an interpreter for Little Owl. Little Owl's band consisted of 180 lodges who visited the surveying party of Ferdinand V. Hayden and Captain William F. Raynolds.

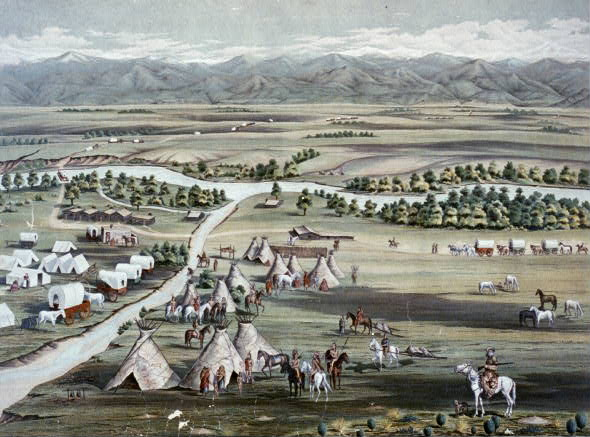
Denver in 1859, Collier & Cleveland Litho Company, Library of Congress Prints and Photographs Division Washington, D.C.

The Arapaho people had often camped at the confluence of Cherry Creek and the South Platte River. With the Pike's Peak Gold Rush, miners settled in the area that became the city of Denver. The Arapahos had tried to live peacefully with white men.

Denver was troubled with a good deal of lawlessness, and one night in particular two horse thieves were shot as they were attempting to steal horses of a corral. This made a good deal of talk and excitement in the town, and the Indians decided that the white men were a rather disreputable lot.

In the 1850s, the United States government broke their treaty agreements, which ruined the reputation of the friendly chiefs who had signed the 1851 treaty. Warriors were more revered. A newcomer to treaty negotiations, Medicine Man was selected as the Arapaho's spokesman at the 1859 treaty council. Other headmen in attendance were Little Owl, Black Bear, Friday, and Cut Nose.

== Fort Wise Treaty ==
Little Owl refused to participate in the signing or recognition of the Treaty of Fort Wise (1861). The Colorado bands of Arapahoes were ready to accept life on a reservation at Sand Creek, while Little Owl and Friday wished to continue to live along the Cache la Poudre River in northern Colorado. Little Owl was still against moving his band of about 50 lodges to Sand Creek in 1863, when the reservation was established. There was no game on the land, and buffalo were 100 or more miles away. At the time, there was also dissension between the Northern and Southern Arapaho people. Starvation became a significant issue that caused concern that the Southern Arapaho might join the Sioux in a war against the whites.

During the Sand Creek massacre of November 29, 1864, whites attacked an encampment of Arapaho and Cheyenne without provocation. After that, Arapaho became known as "war chiefs" for their wars against the whites in Colorado, Wyoming, and Kansas.

== Popular culture ==
- Olcott, Frances Jenkins (1917). "Little Owl Boy (Arapaho)". The red Indian fairy book for the children's own reading and for story-tellers. Boston, New York: Houghton Mifflin Company. A book of Native American chiefs and leaders.

== Bibliography ==
- Fowler, Loretta (1982). Arapahoe politics, 1851-1978 : symbols in crises of authority. University of Nebraska Press.
- Fowler, Loretta (1989). The Arapaho. New York : Chelsea House Publishers. ISBN 978-1-55546-690-9.
- Trenholm, Virginia Cole (1970). The Arapahoes, our people. Norman, University of Oklahoma Press. ISBN 978-0-8061-0908-4.
