= Bridger (name) =

Bridger is both a surname and a given name. Notable people with the name include:

Surname:

- Bobby Bridger (born 1945), American artist
- Deonne Bridger (born 1972), Australian athlete
- Harry Bridger (18th century), English professional cricketer
- Irene Bridger (21st century), Canadian singer
- Lewis Bridger (born 1989), English motorcycle racer
- Samuel Bridger (1777 – after 1825), English professional cricketer
- Tom Bridger (1934–1991), British racing driver
- Joseph Bridger, Colonial Governor of Virginia
- Jim Bridger, American explorer after whom many places are named
- Bridger family of Virginia, notable to American history

Given name:

- Bridger Palmer (born 1998), American actor

Fictional characters:

- Nathan Bridger, a character on the television series seaQuest DSV
- Ezra Bridger, a character on the television series Star Wars Rebels
- "Mr. Bridger", a character in The Italian Job
- Billy Bridger, a character in the video game Battlefield V.
  - Arthur Bridger, the father of Billy in Battlefield V.
