= Fort Pierre =

Fort Pierre may refer to:

- Fort Pierre, South Dakota, a city
- Fort Pierre Chouteau, a trading and military outpost in central South Dakota, just north of the city, from 1832 to 1857
- New Fort Pierre, a fort located 3 1/2 miles north of the site of Fort Pierre Chouteau from 1859 to 1863
