= Union Pass =

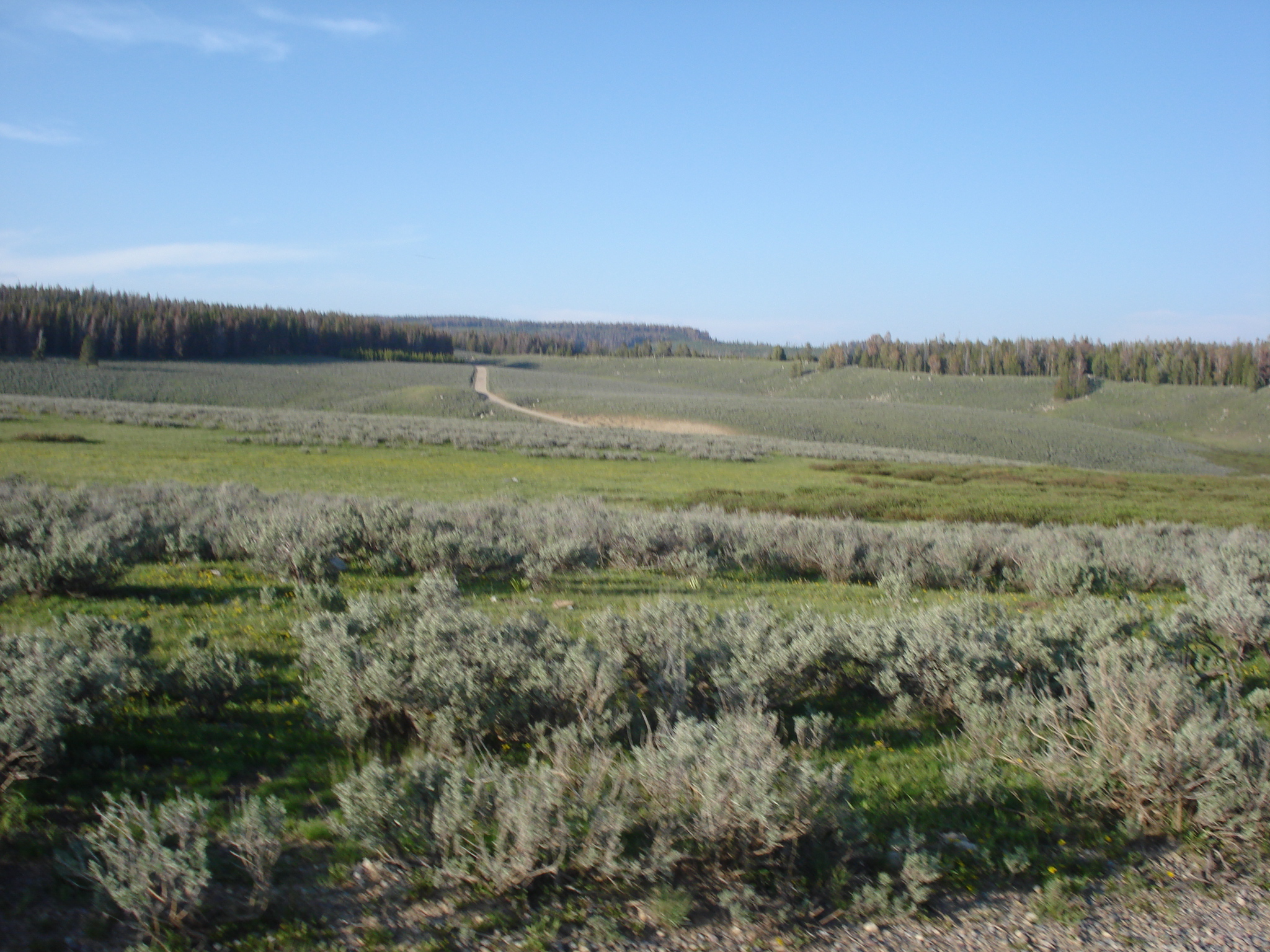
- Interactive map of Union Pass
- Elevation: 9,212 ft (2,808 m)
- Traversed by: Prehistoric

Location
- Location: Fremont County, Wyoming, US
- Range: Wind River Range
- Coordinates: 43°28′53″N 109°52′36″W
- Topo map: USGS Fish Creek Park (WY)

- Union Pass
- U.S. National Register of Historic Places
- Location: Wind River Range
- Nearest city: Dubois, Wyoming
- NRHP reference No.: 69000367
- Added to NRHP: April 4, 1969

Union Pass is a high mountain pass in the Wind River Range in Fremont County of western Wyoming in the United States. The pass is located on the Continental Divide between the Gros Ventre mountains on the west and the Wind River Range on the east. A triple divide exists nearby, where water may flow to the Mississippi River, Columbia River, or Colorado River. The pass was historically used by Native Americans and early mountain men including the Astor Expedition in 1811 on its way west. On the return trip, fearing hostile Indian activity near Union Pass, the Astorians chose a southern route and discovered South Pass.

The pass was named by U.S. Army Captain William F. Raynolds in 1860. Raynolds was in charge of the Raynolds Expedition which was exploring the Yellowstone region immediately prior to the Civil War. After mountain man and guide Jim Bridger led the expedition over the pass, Raynolds gave the pass its current name.

== Location ==
Union Pass is located in the mountains of northwestern Wyoming. It is at an elevation of 9,210 feet (2,810 m). It is a hub from which three Wyoming Mountain Ranges radiate. The three separate directions – the Wind River Range to the southeast (Gannett Peak, 13,804 feet (4,207 m)), the Gros Ventre Range (Doubletop Peak, 11,720 feet (3,570 m)) to the west and the Absaroka Range to the north (Francs Peak, 13,153 feet (4,009 m)). The pass is 4,000 feet (1,200 m) lower than mountains around it. This provides easy passage among the headwaters of three river systems, the Colorado, the Columbia and the Missouri.

An unimproved dirt road crosses the pass, connecting U.S. Route 287 near Dubois to U.S. Route 189 in Pinedale.

== Native Americans ==
Reports from the fur trappers who first entered the mountains and those following mention the trail through the pass as being in long term us by the Shoshone, Bannack, Arapaho, Gros Ventre, Flat Head or Bitterroot Salish, Nez Perce, Crow and others. The pass provide access into three river sheds. An east-west route ran from the east up the Wind River valley and provided a western route by the Gros Ventre or Hoback Rivers to the Valley of the Snake River in Jackson's Hole. To go south, the traveler would follow the Green River. The Union Pass Route was an extension of a North South Route up the Valley of the Yellowstone. Coming up the Valley of the Thoroughfare, west of the Absaroka Range and south of Yellowstone Lake, the trail followed the North Fork of the Yellowstone. Crossing over Two Ocean Pass, the trail split east and west around Terrace Mountain into the Wind River Valley at DuNoir. From Union Pass south bound travelers could use the Green River Valley to connect east through South Pass or west toward the Snake River.

== Astorians – 1811 ==
John Colter may have been the first easterner to visit the pass in 1807, but this is based on circumstantial evidence and is disputed by scholars. Wilson Price Hunt, the Astorians overland to the mouth of the Columbia reported crossing Union Pass on September 15, 1811. This is the first record of the pass. The expedition guides were Edward Robinson, John Hoback and Jacob Rizner. Their previous participation in 1809 with the Henry expedition to the source of the Missouri River and back by way of the Green River it is accepted that the three had been through Union Pass, during the year 1810.

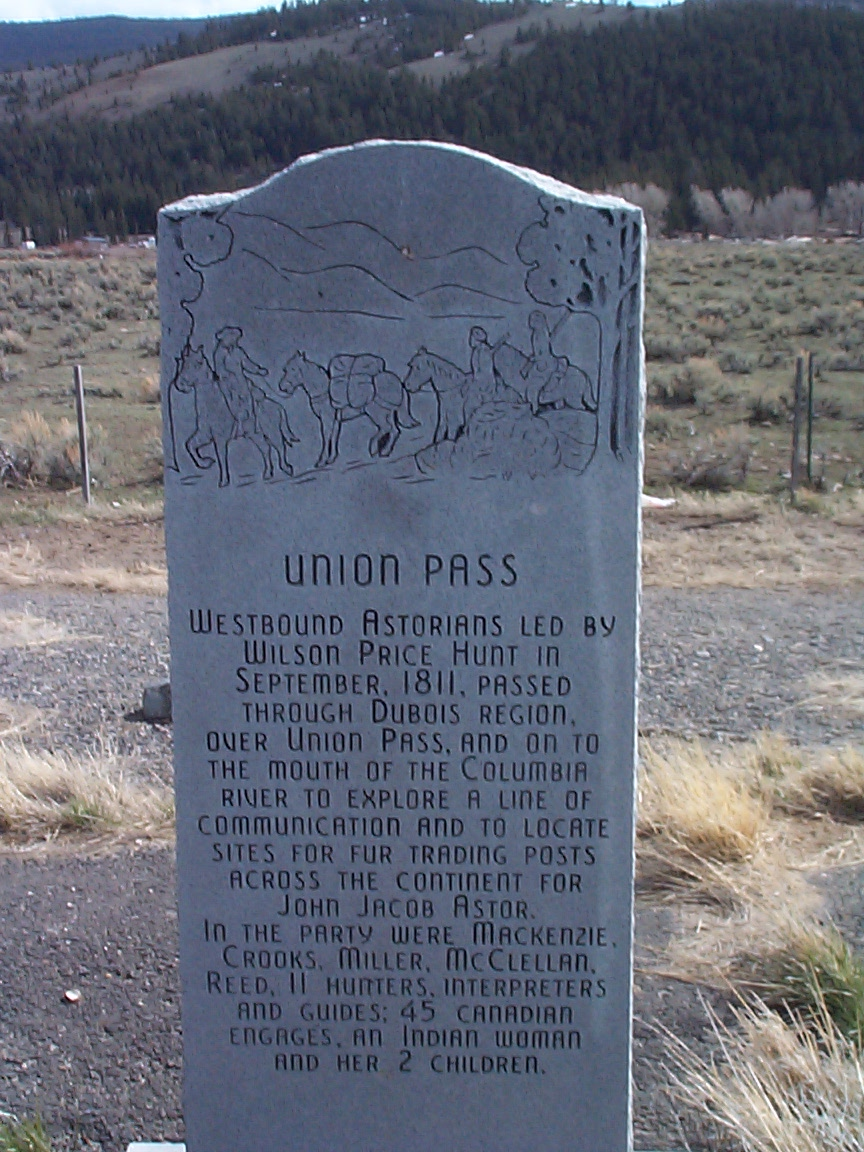
Historical marker describing first crossings.

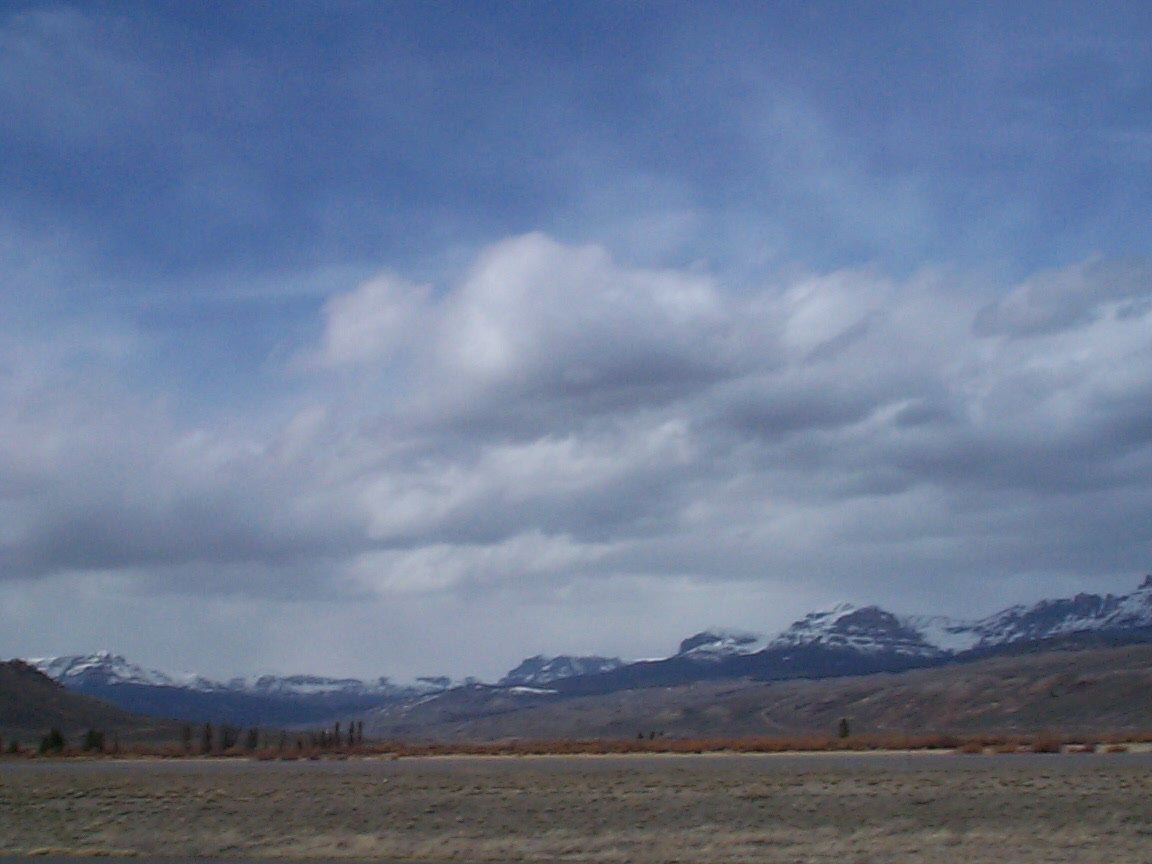
View of Union Pass

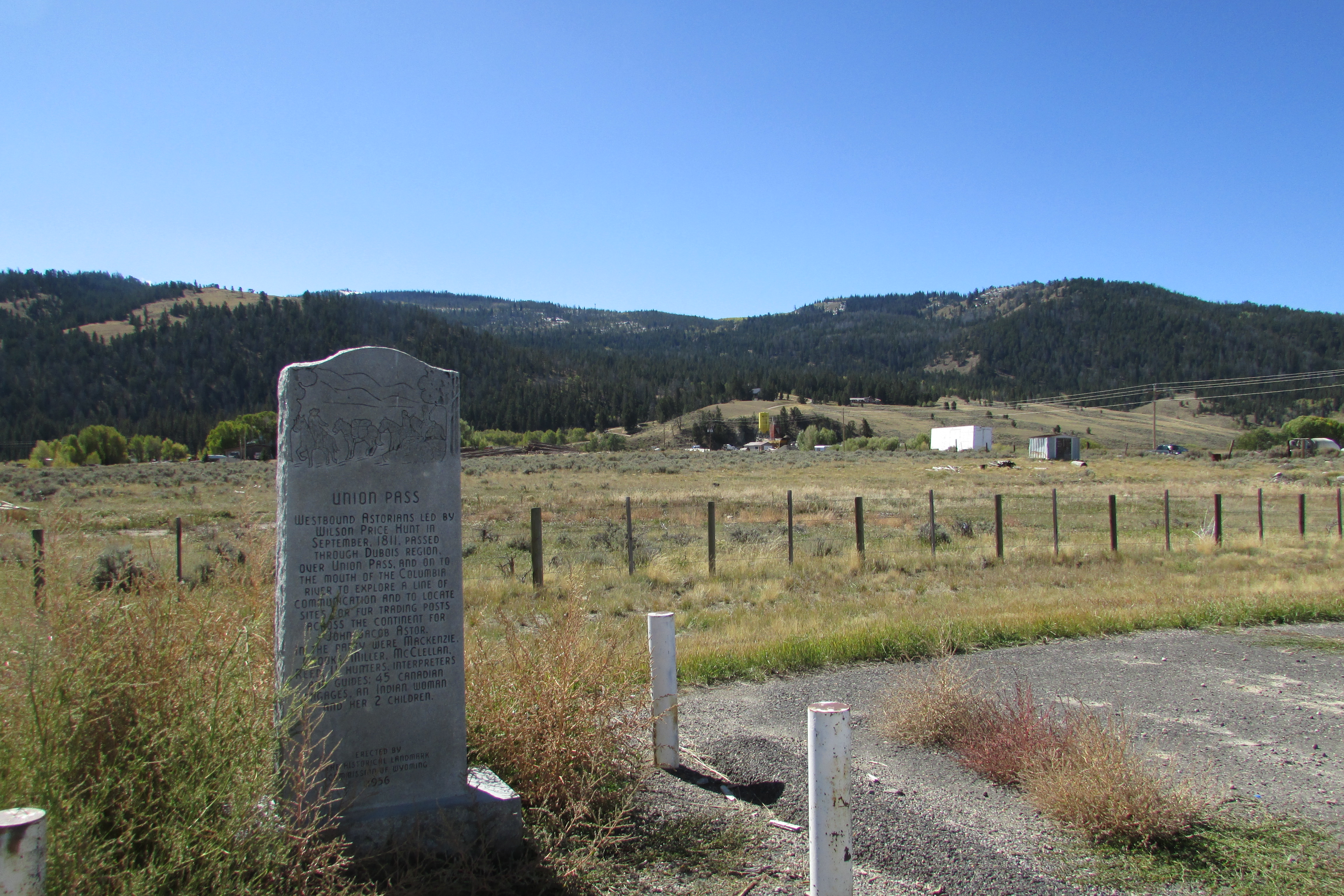
Vicinity of the Historic marker for Union Pass on U.S. 26 & U.S. 287 in DuNoir with the Wind River Mtns in the background.

== See also ==
- Camp Dubois, Wyoming
- Union Pass (Mohave County, Arizona)
- Union Pass (Nye County, Nevada)

== Bibliography ==
- Burton Harris. John Colter, His Years in the Rockies. Charles Scribner's Sons, New York 1952.
- Frances Fuller Victor. Eleven Years in the Rocky Mountains and Life on the Frontier. Columbian Book Company, Hartford Connecticut 1877. Published by Subscription.
- Webster's Geographic Dictionary—G. & C. Merriam Co. Springfield, Massachusetts, U. S. A.--1964.
- Hayden. U. S. Geological and Geographical Survey of the Territories of Wyoming and Idaho 1878, Part I. Conducted under the authority of the Secretary of the Interior. Washington: Government Printing Office-1883.
- Washington Irving. Astoria. Clatsop Edition, Binfords & Mort, Publishers Portland Oregon—undated.
- Washington Irving. The Adventures of Captain Bonneville; edited and with introduction (and modern footnotes) by Edgeley W. Todd. Norman: University of Oklahoma Press-1961.
