= Bridger Mountains =

The Bridger Mountains may refer to either of two mountain ranges in the United States:

- Bridger Range (Montana)
- Bridger Mountains (Wyoming)

== See also ==
- Bridger Mountain, West Virginia
