= Bridgers =

Bridgers is a surname. Notable people with the surname include:

- Aaron Bridgers (1918–2003), American jazz pianist
- John Bridgers (1922–2006), American football coach
- Luther B. Bridgers (1884–1948), American minister and songwriter
- Robert Rufus Bridgers (1819–1888), American politician
- Phoebe Bridgers (born 1994), American singer-songwriter
- Sean Bridgers (born 1968), American actor, screenwriter, and producer
