= William F. Raynolds =

U.S. Army surveyor and topographer

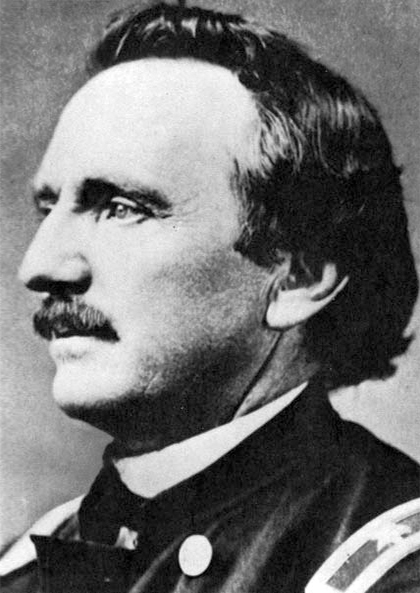
- Born: William Franklin Raynolds; March 17, 1820; Canton, Ohio, U.S.
- Died: October 18, 1894 (aged 74); Detroit, Michigan, U.S.
- Military career
- Allegiance: United States
- Branch: U.S. Army
- Service years: 1843–1884
- Rank: Colonel; Brevet Brigadier General
- Units: Corps of Engineers; Corps of Topographical Engineers
- Conflicts: Mexican–American War; American Civil War

William Franklin Raynolds (March 17, 1820 – October 18, 1894) was an American explorer, engineer and U.S. army officer who served in the Mexican–American War and American Civil War. He is best known for leading the 1859–60 Raynolds Expedition while serving as a member of the U.S. Army Corps of Topographical Engineers.

During the 1850s and again after his participation in the Civil War, Raynolds was the head engineer on numerous lighthouse construction projects. He oversaw riverway and harbor dredging projects intended to improve accessibility and navigation for shipping. As a cartographer, Raynolds surveyed and mapped the islands and shorelines on the Great Lakes and other regions. At least six lighthouses whose construction he oversaw are still standing. Some are still in use and of these, several are listed on the National Register of Historic Places.

In 1848, during the American occupation of Mexico after the Mexican–American War, Raynolds and other U.S. Army personnel were the first confirmed to have reached the summit of Pico de Orizaba, the tallest mountain in Mexico, and inadvertently set what may have been a 50-year American alpine altitude record. In 1859, Raynolds was placed in charge of the first government-sponsored expedition to venture into the upper Yellowstone region that was later to become Yellowstone National Park. Heavy winter snowpack in the Absaroka Range of Wyoming prevented the expedition from reaching the Yellowstone Plateau, forcing them to divert to the south and cross Union Pass at the northern end of the Wind River Range. After negotiating the pass the expedition entered Jackson Hole and surveyed the Teton Range, now within Grand Teton National Park.

During the Civil War, Raynolds participated in the Battle of Cross Keys during the Valley Campaign of 1862 and a year later was in charge of fortifications in the defense of the military arsenal at Harpers Ferry, West Virginia. On March 13, 1865, Raynolds was brevetted brigadier general for meritorious service during the Civil War. After the war, Lt. Col Raynolds was assigned to a myriad of positions across the Nation to include establishing the St. Louis Engineer Office of the U.S. Army Corps of Engineers from 1870 to 1872. Raynolds retired from the army on March 17, 1884, with the permanent rank of colonel.

== Early life ==
William Franklin Raynolds was born on March 17, 1820, in Canton, Ohio, the fourth of six children to William Raynolds and Elizabeth Seabury (née Fisk). William F. Raynolds's grandfather, also named William Raynolds, was a veteran of the War of 1812, serving as a company captain from April 12, 1812, until April 13, 1813. During the War of 1812, the grandfather Raynolds rose to the rank of major while serving under Lewis Cass.

William F. Raynolds entered the United States Military Academy at West Point, New York, on July 1, 1839, after being appointed (Note: Before the American Civil War (1860–65), appointments to the United States Military Academy usually occurred after a nominee petitioned his U.S. Representative in Congress. If the Representative believed the nominee was up to the task, deserving of the opportunity and of the right character, the nominee would then be appointed to attend the academy. U.S. Representatives could make only one appointment per year.) from Ohio. He graduated fifth out of 39 classmates in his class of 1843. Raynolds married at a young age; he and his wife had no children.

== Military career ==
Initially appointed a brevet second lieutenant in the 5th U.S. Infantry, within a few weeks Raynolds was transferred to the U.S. Army Corps of Topographical Engineers. The Topographical Engineers performed surveys and developed maps for army use until their merger with the Corps of Engineers in 1863. Raynolds's first assignments from 1843 to 1844 were as an assistant topographical engineer involved in improving navigation on the Ohio River and surveying the northeastern boundary of the U.S. between 1844 and 1847.

=== Mexican–American War ===
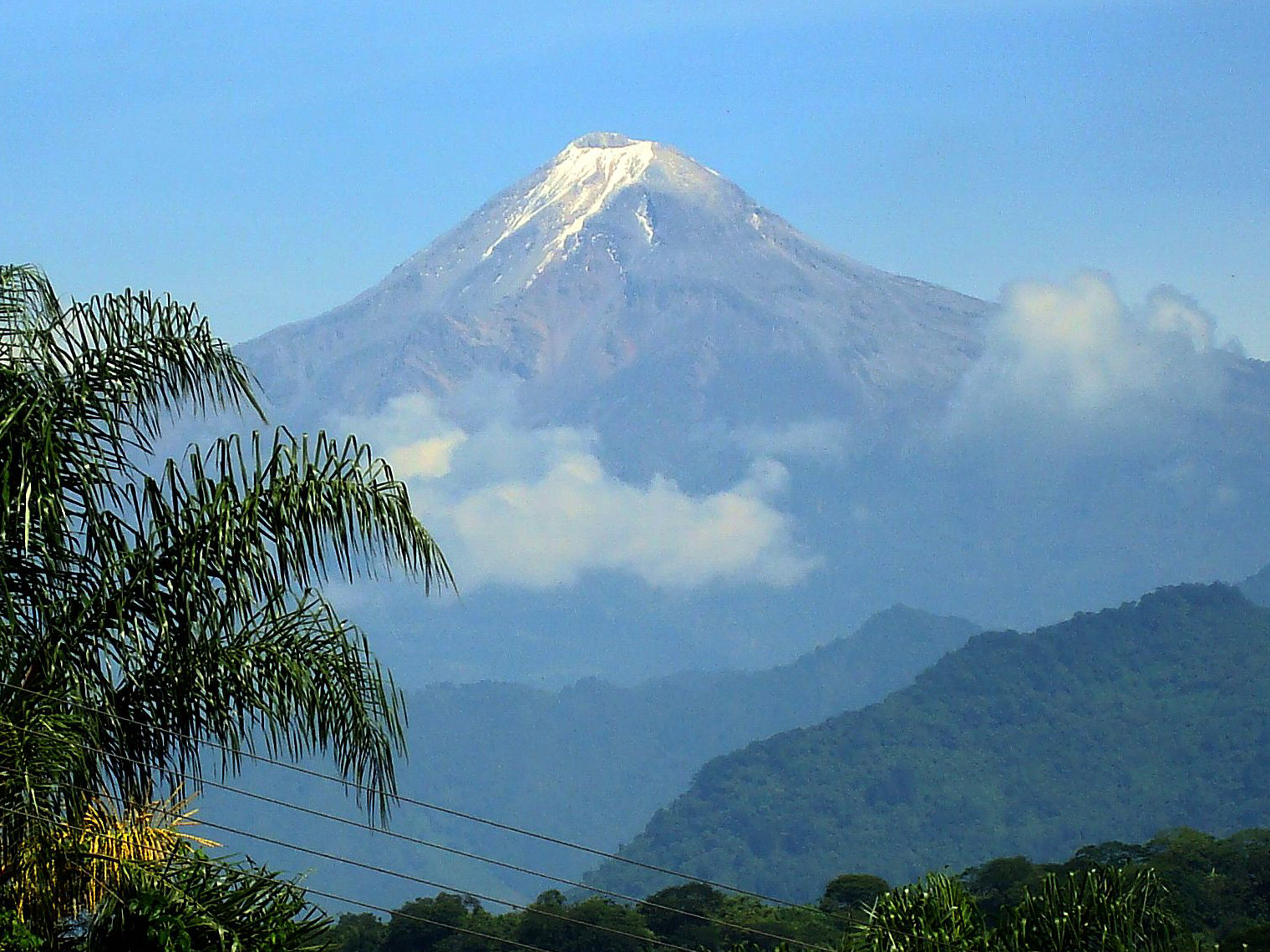
Pico de Orizaba was believed by Raynolds to be the tallest mountain in North America.

When war with Mexico seemed imminent, topographic engineers were sent to the border to assist with the army's preparations. Raynolds served in Winfield Scott's Mexican–American War campaign that marched overland to Mexico City from the Gulf of Mexico seaport at Veracruz. After the war, the American army occupied Mexico City and the surrounding region. During the occupation, Raynolds and others set out to map and explore nearby mountains. Raynolds's party is credited with being the first confirmed to climb to the summit of Pico de Orizaba (19°01′48″N 97°16′12″W), which at 18,620 feet (5,680 m), is the tallest mountain in Mexico and third tallest in North America. Over a period of several months, Raynolds and other officers from both the army and navy mapped the best approach route to Pico de Orizaba. To assist them in their climb, the party planned on taking grapnels attached to long ropes and primitive crampons in the form of shoes with projecting points to help ensure they could safely climb up cliffs and across glaciers. Told by local villagers that any attempt to reach the summit would be fruitless because no one had ever done it before, (Note: In 1838, French-Belgian botanist Henri Guillaume Galeotti may have climbed as high as the mountain crater but he made no claim to have reached the summit. Neither the Mexicans nor the Americans were aware of Galeotti's earlier visit.) the Americans became even more determined to show the Mexicans it could be climbed.

As the expedition left to ascend the mountain, a long pack train of nearly fifty officers, soldiers and native guides departed from the town of Orizaba in early May 1848. After several days of hiking through dense jungle, the expedition slowly gained altitude and established a base camp at 12,000 ft (3,700 m). Starting from base camp in the early morning of May 10 nearly two dozen climbers made the final push to the top of the mountain, but only Raynolds and a few others reached the summit. According to mountaineer and author Leigh N. Ortenburger, this feat may have inadvertently set the American mountaineering altitude record for the next fifty years. Raynolds estimated the summit of Pico de Orizaba to be 17,907 ft (5,458 m) above sea level, which was slightly greater than previous estimates but below the modern known altitude. As no higher peaks were known in North America at that time, Raynolds believed Pico de Orizaba was the tallest mountain on the continent. The summit crater was covered in snow but estimated to be between 400 and 650 yards (370 and 590 m) in diameter and 300 ft (91 m) deep. The American achievement was disputed by the Mexicans until an 1851 French expedition discovered an American flag on the summit with the year 1848 carved in the flagpole.

=== Lighthouse engineer ===
After returning from Mexico, Raynolds resumed mapping the U.S.–Canada border which he had been surveying before the war, then embarked on a project to develop water resources for the nation's growing capital of Washington, D.C. Raynolds traveled the Great Lakes for several years surveying and mapping shorelines while identifying potential lighthouse locations. After promotion to first lieutenant and then captain, in 1857 he was assigned to design and supervise the construction of lighthouses along the Jersey Shore and the Delmarva Peninsula regions. in the late 1850s Raynolds supervised construction of the Fenwick Island Light in Delaware and the Cape May Light in New Jersey. In 1859, Raynolds was working on finishing the Jupiter Inlet Light in Jupiter, Florida, when he was reassigned to lead the first U.S. Government-sponsored expedition to explore the Yellowstone region.

=== Raynolds Expedition ===
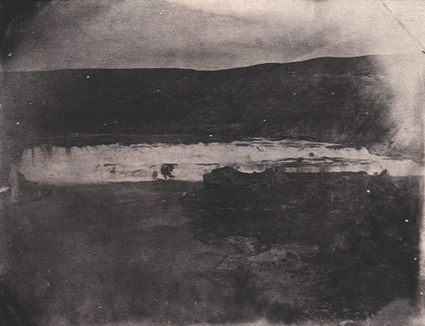
The Great Falls of the Missouri River (1860) by James D. Hutton is one of the few remaining photographs taken during the expedition. The wet-plate photographic techniques available at the time of the expedition provided only poor quality imagery.

In early 1859, Raynolds was charged with leading an expedition into the Yellowstone region of Montana and Wyoming to determine, "as far as practicable, everything relating to ... the Indians of the country, its agricultural and mineralogical resources ... the navigability of its streams, its topographical features, and the facilities or obstacles which the latter present to the construction of rail or common roads ..." The expedition was carried out by a handful of technicians, including photographer and topographer James D. Hutton, artist and mapmaker Anton Schönborn, and geologist and naturalist Ferdinand V. Hayden, who led several later expeditions to the Yellowstone region. Raynolds's second-in-command was lieutenant Henry E. Maynadier. The expedition was supported by a small infantry detachment of 30 and was federally funded with $60,000. Experienced mountain man Jim Bridger was hired to guide the expedition.

The expedition started in late May 1859 at St. Louis, Missouri, then was transported by two steamboats up the Missouri River to New Fort Pierre, South Dakota. In late June the expedition left New Fort Pierre and headed overland to Fort Sarpy where they encountered the Crow Indians. Raynolds said the Crow were a "small band compared to their neighbors, but are famous warriors, and, according to common report, seldom fail to hold their own with any of the tribes unless greatly outnumbered." Raynolds was impressed with Chief Red Bear and, after assuring him the expedition meant only to pass through their territory and not linger, traded with the Crow for seven horses.

Raynolds divided his expedition, sending a smaller detachment under Maynadier to explore the Tongue River, a major tributary of the Yellowstone River. Two of Maynadier's party, James D. Hutton and Zephyr Recontre, the expedition's Sioux interpreter, took a side trip to locate and investigate an isolated rock formation that had been seen from great distance by a previous expedition in 1857. Hutton was the first person of European descent to reach this rock formation in northeastern Wyoming, later known as Devils Tower; Raynolds never elaborated on this event, mentioning it only in passing. By September 2, 1859, Raynolds's detachment had followed the Yellowstone River to the confluence with the Bighorn River in south-central Montana. The two parties under Raynolds and Maynadier reunited on October 12, 1859, and wintered at Deer Creek Station, on the Platte River in central Wyoming.

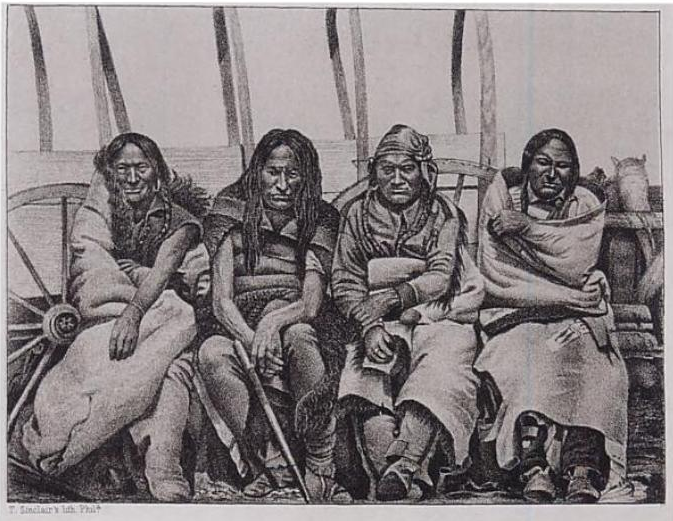
"Principal Chiefs of the Arapaho Tribe" is an engraving after a photograph taken by James Hutton during the expedition. The Arapaho interpreter Warshinun is seated at right.

The expedition recommenced its explorations in May 1860. Raynolds led a party north and west up the upstream portion of the Bighorn River, which is today called the Wind River, hoping to cross the mountains at Togwotee Pass in the Absaroka Range, a mountain pass known to expedition guide Jim Bridger. Meanwhile, Maynadier led his party back north to the Bighorn River to explore it and its associated tributary streams more thoroughly. The plan was for the two parties to reunite on June 30, 1860, at Three Forks, Montana, so they could make observations of a total solar eclipse forecast for July 18, 1860. Hampered by towering basaltic cliffs and deep snows, Raynolds attempted for over a week to reconnoiter to the top of Togwotee Pass, but was forced south due to the June 30 deadline for reaching Three Forks. Bridger then led the party south over another pass in the northern Wind River Range that Raynolds named Union Pass, to the west of which lay Jackson Hole and the Teton Range. From there the expedition went southwest, crossing the southern Teton Range at Teton Pass and entering Pierre's Hole in present-day Idaho. Though Raynolds and his party managed to get to Three Forks by the scheduled date, Maynadier's party was several days late, which prevented a detachment heading north to observe the solar eclipse. The reunited expedition then headed home, traveling from Fort Benton, Montana, to Fort Union near the Montana-North Dakota border via steamboat. It then journeyed overland to Omaha, Nebraska, where the expedition members were disbanded in October 1860.

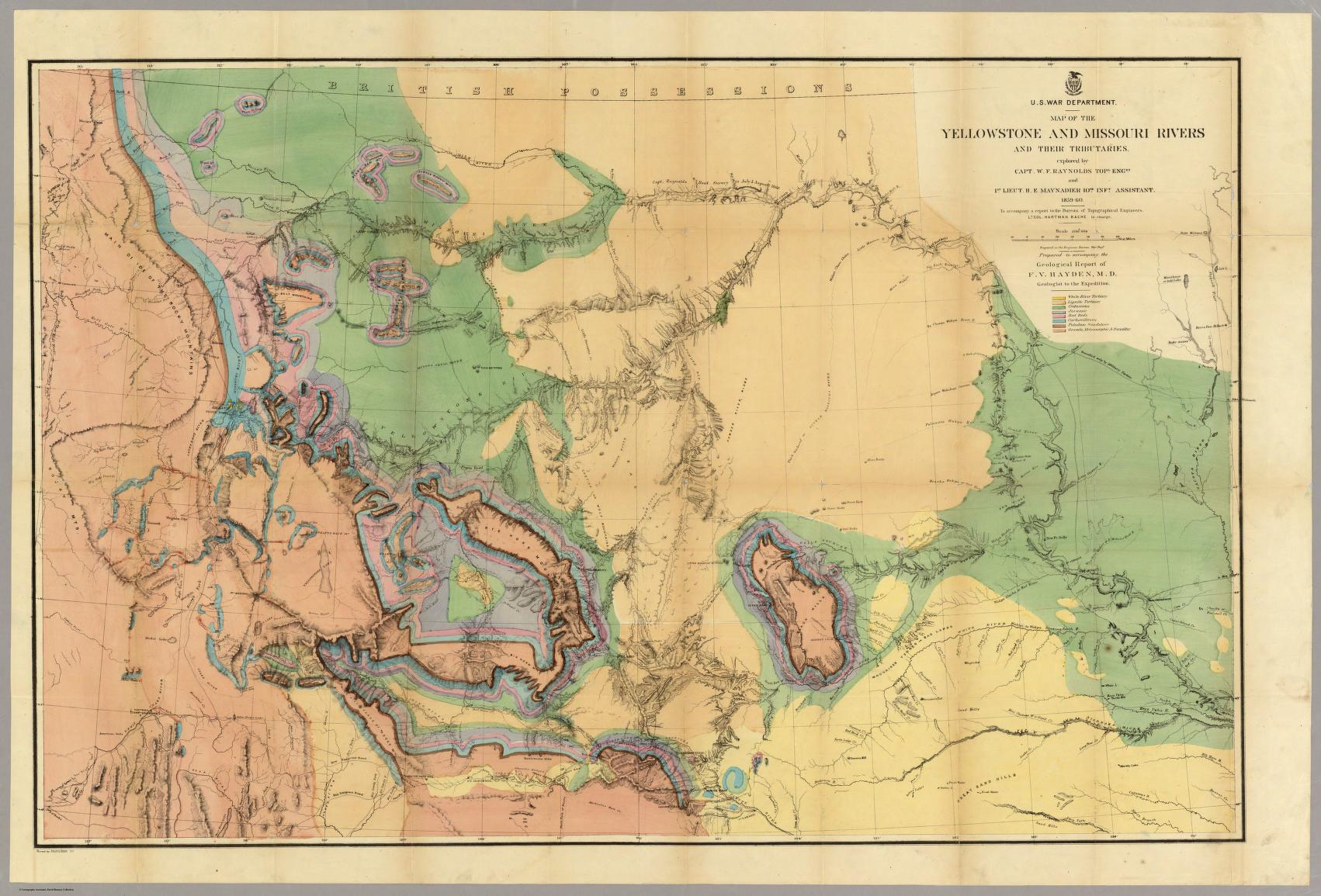
Hayden's geological map from the expedition that was published in 1869

Though the Raynolds Expedition was unsuccessful in exploring the region that later became Yellowstone National Park, it was the first federally funded party to enter Jackson Hole and observe the Teton Range. The expedition covered over 2,500 miles (4,000 km) and explored an area of nearly 250,000 square miles (650,000 km^{2}). In a preliminary report sent east in 1859, Raynolds stated that the once-abundant bison were being killed for their hides at such an alarming rate they might soon become extinct. Raynolds's immediate participation in the Civil War, followed by a severe illness, delayed him from presenting his report on the expedition until 1868. Research data and botanical specimens, as well as fossils and geological items that had been collected during the expedition, were sent to the Smithsonian Institution but were not studied in detail until after the war. Much of the artwork created by Hutton and especially Schönborn was lost, though several of Schönborn's chromolithographs appeared in Ferdinand V. Hayden's 1883 report that was submitted after later expeditions.

=== American Civil War ===
Raynolds returned to Washington at the outbreak of the war, and was made chief topographic engineer of the Department of Virginia in July 1861. The army lacked adequate maps for military use, so Raynolds and his team of engineers began to survey and draw up maps of Virginia and the region of the western portion of that state that had remained loyal to the Union and would become the new state of West Virginia. In 1862, Raynolds was engaged with John C. Frémont's Mountain Department in chasing Stonewall Jackson up the Shenandoah Valley and participated in the Battle of Cross Keys.

Raynolds spent two months recovering from illness after the Valley Campaign, then was assigned as chief engineer of Middle Department and VIII Corps in January 1863. Promoted to major in the Corps of Engineers, he found himself in charge of the defenses of vital Harpers Ferry, West Virginia, in March 1863 during Robert E. Lee's second Confederate invasion of the north during the Gettysburg campaign. On March 31, 1863, the Corps of Topographical Engineers ceased to be an independent branch of the army and was merged into the Corps of Engineers and Raynolds served in that branch of the army for the rest of his career. Officers from the two corps maintained their ranks based on the time at which they received their promotion.

As the end of war approached and hostilities with the Sioux Indians loomed, Raynolds's knowledge of and experiences in the Great Lakes region became more important to the army than his command of the fortifications of Harpers Ferry. As a result, he returned to the Great Lakes as superintending engineer of surveys and lighthouses in April 1864, and saw no further combat for the rest of his career. Before the war was over, on March 13, 1865, Raynolds was brevetted to brigadier general for meritorious service.

=== Postwar career ===
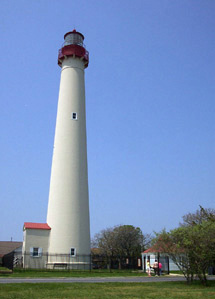
The construction of the Cape May Lighthouse was overseen by Raynolds in 1859 and the lighthouse is still in use. It was listed on the National Register of Historic Places in 1973.

After the Civil War, the Corps of Engineers undertook a program of river and harbor improvements. Raynolds supervised the dredging and improvement of navigation on the Arkansas, Mississippi and Missouri Rivers. He also helped supervise several harbor dredging and construction projects, involving the harbor in Buffalo, New York, the Harbor of Refuge in New Buffalo, Michigan, Erie Harbor in Erie, Pennsylvania, and the river harbors of St. Louis, Missouri and Alton, Illinois. Raynolds sited and oversaw the installation of dozens of lighthouses in the Great Lakes area, where he served as the superintending engineer from 1864 to 1870. Raynolds was promoted to permanent rank of lieutenant colonel in the Corps of Engineers on March 7, 1867. He then supervised lighthouse construction along the Gulf Coast and in New Jersey where he managed the construction of the Hereford Inlet Lighthouse in 1874.

In 1870, work on the harbors received a boost when the Office of Western River Improvements relocated from Cincinnati, Ohio, to St. Louis with the reassignment of Lt. Col. Raynolds as officer in charge. Since the 1830s, the work of the Office of Western River Improvements had been divided between the Ohio River on one hand and Mississippi, Arkansas, Red, and Missouri rivers on the other. In practice, engineer officers in the Corps of Topographical Engineers maintained temporary offices near each project to oversee work, including one in St. Louis or Alton. After the Civil War and the reunification of the Topographical Engineers and Corps of Engineers, there were separate offices overseeing work on the Ohio River and Western Rivers, each reporting separately to the Chief of Engineers. Most of this work remained snag removal, for which the Corps had built numerous snag-removal vessels. It was only logical to relocate the office closer to the projects being managed by moving the Office of Ohio River Improvements to Cincinnati and Western River Improvements to St. Louis. This was, in essence, the first step taken from a project-based Corps office in St. Louis to what became a district office overseeing regional projects. By 1872, Raynolds was reporting from the Engineer Office in St. Louis with responsibility from the Illinois to the Ohio River rather than from the Office of Western River Improvements, which had ceased to exist.

From May 5 to October 7, 1877, Raynolds led a procession of American engineers to an engineering conference in Europe. Promoted to the permanent rank of colonel on January 2, 1881, Raynolds continued serving with the Corps of Engineers supporting a variety of harbor and river navigational improvements until his retirement in 1884, after a military career spanning forty years. As he approached retirement, Raynolds was elected a trustee of the Presbyterian Church. According to West Point classmate Joseph J. Reynolds, who saw him at the West Point graduates' reunion in 1893, Raynolds maintained a vigorous and healthy appearance long after his retirement, his brown hair, "then but slightly sprinkled with gray". Raynolds died on October 18, 1894, in Detroit, Michigan, leaving his widow a substantial estate for the time, estimated at between US$50,000 ($1,935,000 today) and $100,000 ($3,870,000 today). After providing for his widow, his will directed that after her death, the entire estate would be donated to the Presbyterian Church. Raynolds was interred in West Lawn Cemetery in Canton, Ohio.

== Legacy ==
Raynolds's 1848 expedition to the summit of Pico de Orizaba in Mexico predated what is known as the Golden age of alpinism (1854–65), when many major mountain peaks in the Alps were first climbed. The effort to summit the mountain was one of the earliest deliberate attempts to climb a major mountain peak, and involved logistics, planning and use of rudimentary climbing equipment, "making it one of the more serious mountaineering expeditions undertaken to that point in history". Though unable to penetrate into the heart of what later became Yellowstone National Park, the Raynolds Expedition produced maps that were used by subsequent explorers to the greater Yellowstone region. Raynolds also located suitable wagon routes in the Bighorn Basin and was able to help narrow down the most appropriate routes for a future transcontinental railroad. The Raynolds Expedition further determined that few if any rivers in the region would be suitable for steamboats due to numerous rapids and steep gradients. Several lighthouses whose construction was designed or supervised by Raynolds are still in use and several are listed on the National Register of Historic Places.

At least two geographical locations are named for William Raynolds. The mountain gap where his expedition crossed the Continental Divide between southwest Montana and northeast Idaho is named Raynolds Pass (44°42′40″N 111°28′11″W) and Raynolds Peak (43°52′15″N 110°49′30″W) is an isolated peak in the Teton Range that was named after him in 1938. The fossil remains of the extinct gastropod Viviparus raynoldsanus was named by Ferdinand V. Hayden in honor of Raynolds after the specimen was collected in the Powder River Basin during the expedition.

Lt. Col. William F. Rayholds is credited with being the first Commander of the St. Louis Engineer Office (now District) with the U.S. Army Corps of Engineers (USACE) as it transferred from the Office of Western River Improvements out of Cincinnati.
