= Henry E. Maynadier =

American military officer (died 1868)

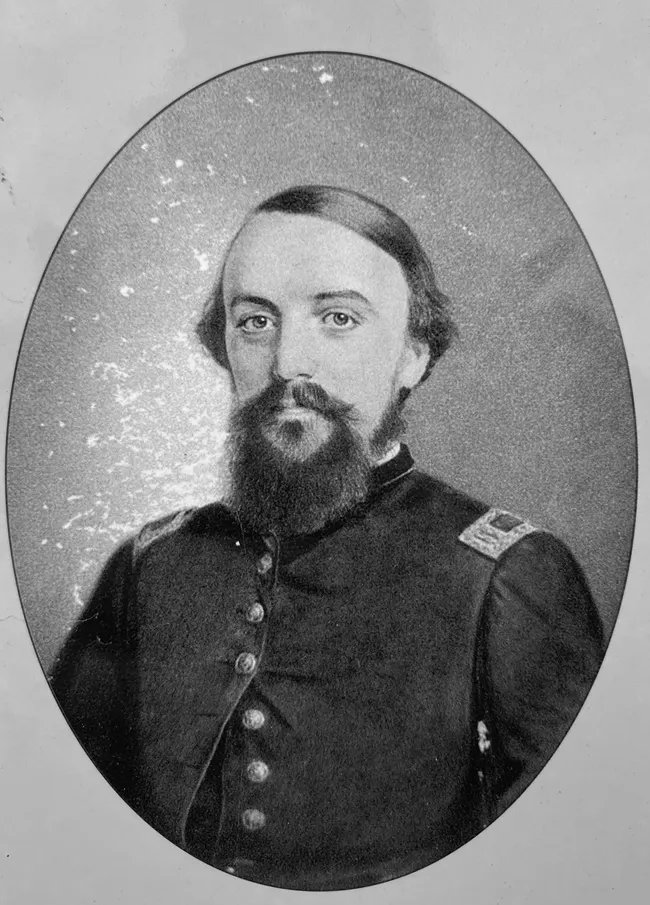
- A portrait of Maynadier during his military service
- Born: Henry Eveleth Maynadier; 1830; Virginia, U.S.
- Died: December 3, 1868 (aged 38); Savannah, Georgia, U.S.
- Burial place: Oak Hill Cemetery; Washington, D.C., U.S.
- Education: United States Military Academy
- Spouse: Julia Barker
- Children: 7
- Military career
- Branch: United States Army
- Service years: 1851–1866
- Service number: Colonel; Bvt. Major General
- Units: Corps of Topographical Engineers; 10th U.S. Infantry Regiment; 12th U.S. Infantry Regiment
- Commands: 5th U.S. Volunteer Infantry Regiment
- Conflicts: American Civil War; Red Cloud's War

Henry Eveleth Maynadier (1830 – December 3, 1868) was a United States Army officer known for his field work in Montana during the Raynolds Expedition and his work to set up peace talks with the Oglala and Brulé tribes at Fort Laramie in 1866. He served in the Union Army during the American Civil War.

== Early life ==
Henry Eveleth Maynadier was born in Virginia to William Murray Maynadier. He was from Norfolk, Virginia. He graduated from the United States Military Academy in 1851.

== Career ==
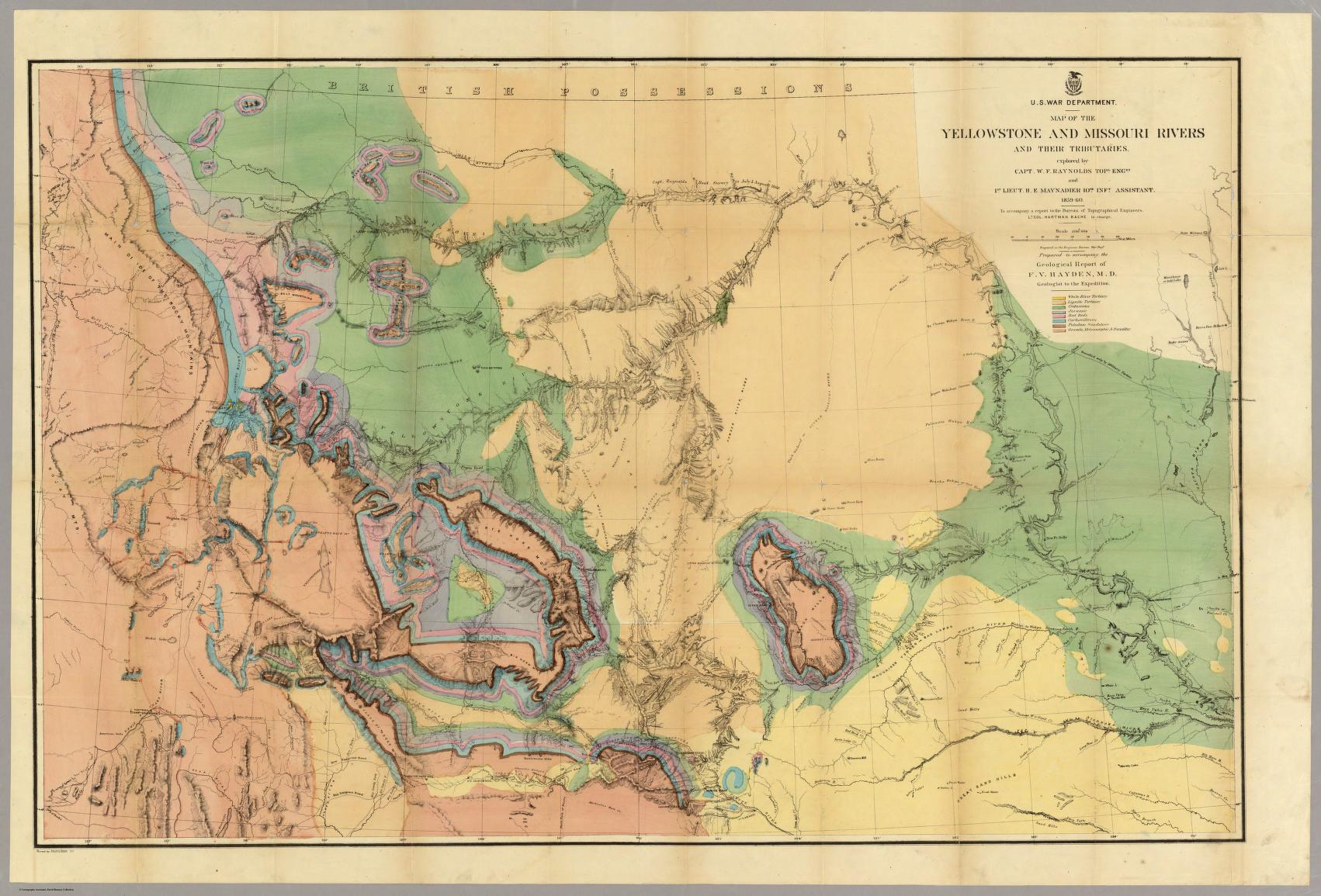
Map of the Raynolds Expedition (1869)

Maynadier was commissioned as a brevet second lieutenant on May 1, 1851, and as second lieutenant on February 29, 1852. Maynadier was commissioned as a first lieutenant on March 3, 1855. In 1859, the Mullan Road was under construction to connect the Upper Missouri River portion of Fort Benton, Montana to the Pacific Ocean. Captain William F. Raynolds and Maynadier of the United States Army Corps of Topographical Engineers were sent to conduct military reconnaissance in a campaign that would be referred to as the Raynolds Expedition. The field work was unique because it would be the most detailed record of the Shields and Yellowstone River trail systems and geography. The timing of their field work during cultural change in the area was particularly important. Their report of their field work in the spring and autumn seasons of 1859 and 1860 would not get filed until 1867, as both Raynolds and Maynadier were called to serve in the American Civil War.

On January 19, 1861, Maynadier was promoted from first lieutenant to captain of Company G, 10th Infantry Regiment. On November 4, 1863, Maynadier succeeded Henry B. Clitz. At the time, he was on detached service as a member of the Hospital Inspection Board in Michigan. He commanded the 1st Battalion of the 12th Infantry Regiment. In January 1865, Maynadier left his command in Elmira, New York for detached service. By the end of the Civil War, Maynadier rose to the rank of Colonel of United States Volunteers and brevet lieutenant colonel in the Regular Army for "faithful and meritorious service".

In March 1866, Maynadier took command of Fort Laramie in Wyoming. Maynadier sent messages to members of the Oglala and Brulé tribes in Powder River Country. He received a response from Brulé leader Spotted Tail, and agreed to the burial of his daughter, Ah-ho-ap-pa (among other names), at Fort Laramie. He was able to coordinate peace talks with Spotted Tail and Red Cloud. Red Cloud left the peace talks, but Spotted Tail, the Brulé people and some southern Ogalala people signed the treaty at Fort Laramie. His actions at Fort Laramie earned Maynadier the distinction of brevet major general for "accomplishing much toward bringing about peace with the late hostile tribes".

On January 16, 1868, Maynadier led Companies B, C, D, F and K by rail to South Carolina, and took stations at Darlington, Georgetown and Beaufort. They later occupied Summerville, South Carolina, Montgomery, Alabama, Fort Pulaski and Savannah, Georgia during the Reconstruction era. He retired from the Army in August 1866 due to illness.

== Personal life ==
Maynadier married Julia Barker, daughter of Captain Thomas Barker. Maynadier had at least two sons, Gibbs and Gustavus.

Maynadier died on December 3, 1868, aged 38, at Oglethorpe Barracks in Savannah. Maynadier was interred at Oak Hill Cemetery in Washington, D.C.

== Legacy ==
In 2007, Maynadier's descendants met with the descendants of Spotted Tail to install a grave marker for Ah-ho-ap-pa's Fort Laramie grave.
