= Robert Rufus Bridgers =

American politician

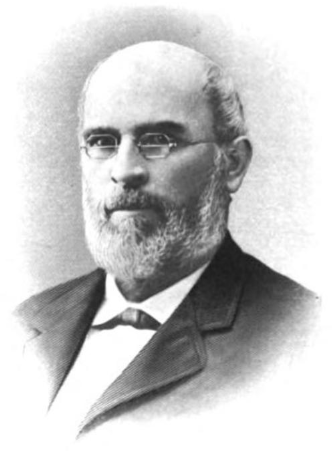

Member of the Confederate House of Representatives
- In office 1862–1865

Member of the North Carolina House of Commons
- In office 1844, 1858–1861

Personal details
- Born: November 28, 1819 Edgecombe County, North Carolina
- Died: December 10, 1888 (aged 69) Columbia, South Carolina
- Spouse: Margaret Elizabeth Johnston (m. 1849)
- Education: University of North Carolina at Chapel Hill
- Occupation: Politician

Robert Rufus Bridgers (November 28, 1819 – December 10, 1888) was a Confederate politician during the American Civil War.

== Biography ==
Bridgers was born in Edgecombe County, North Carolina on November 28, 1819. He graduated from the University of North Carolina at Chapel Hill in 1841. He served in the state legislature in 1844, and again from 1858 to 1861.

He married Margaret Elizabeth Johnston on December 12, 1849.

He represented the state in the First Confederate Congress and the Second Confederate Congress from 1862 to 1865.

He died in Columbia, South Carolina on December 10, 1888.

== See also ==
- Bridger family of Virginia
- Joseph Bridger
- Jim Bridger
