= Raynolds Expedition =

1859–1860 American mapping expedition

Raynolds Expedition noting
- Part of the exploration of North America
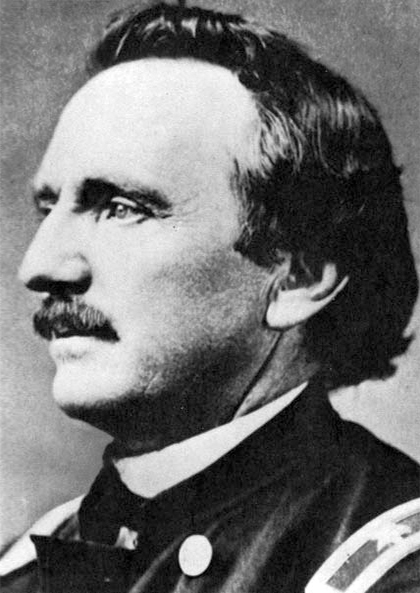
- William F. Raynolds
| Date | 1859–1860 |
| Location | South Dakota, Montana, Wyoming. |

Belligerents
- United States

Commanders and leaders
- (United States) William F. Raynolds (United States) Henry E. Maynadier

Strength
- 33 soldiers: 20 civilians

The Raynolds Expedition was a United States Army exploring and mapping expedition intended to map the unexplored territory between Fort Pierre, Dakota Territory and the headwaters of the Yellowstone River. The expedition was led by topographical engineer Captain William F. Raynolds.

== Expedition description ==
In early 1859, Raynolds was charged with leading an expedition into the Yellowstone region of Montana and Wyoming to determine, "as far as practicable, everything relating to ... the Indians of the country, its agricultural and mineralogical resources ... the navigability of its streams, its topographical features, and the facilities or obstacles which the latter present to the construction of rail or common roads ...". The expedition was carried out by a handful of technicians, including geologist/naturalist F.V. Hayden, who led several later expeditions to the Yellowstone region, photographer and topographer James D. Hutton and artist and mapmaker Anton Schönborn. Raynold's second-in-command was Lt. Henry E. Maynadier. The expedition was supported by a small infantry detachment of 30 and was funded with $60,000 by the U.S. Government. Experienced mountain man Jim Bridger was hired to guide the expedition.

The expedition commenced at St. Louis, Missouri in late May 1859 as the party was transported by two steamboats up the Missouri River to New Fort Pierre, South Dakota. By late June the expedition left Fort Pierre and headed overland, encountering the Crow Indians, exploring the Tongue River and then heading for the Yellowstone River in southern Montana. Raynolds divided his expedition, sending a smaller detachment under Maynadier to explore the Tongue River, a major tributary of the Yellowstone River. James D. Hutton and Zephyr Recontre, the expedition's Sioux interpreter, took a side trip to locate an isolated rock formation that had been seen from great distance by a previous expedition in 1857. Hutton was the first person of European descent to reach the rock formation in northeastern Wyoming, later known as Devils Tower; Raynolds never elaborated on this event, mentioning it only in passing. By September 2, 1859, Raynolds's detachment had followed the Yellowstone River to the confluence with the Bighorn River in south-central Montana. The two parties under Raynolds and Maynadier reunited on October 12, 1859, and wintered at Deer Creek Station, on the Platte River in central Wyoming.

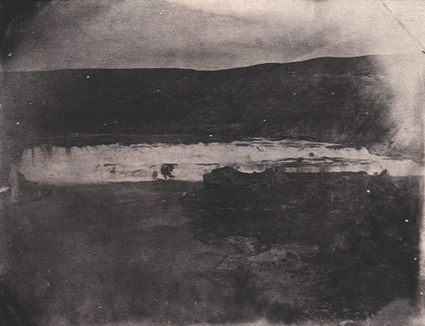
The Great Falls of the Missouri River (1860) by James D. Hutton is one of the few remaining photographs taken during the expedition. The wet-plate photographic techniques available at the time of the expedition provided only poor quality imagery.

In May 1860, the expedition re-commenced their explorations, with Raynolds leading a party north and west up the upstream portion of the Bighorn River, which is known today as the Wind River, hoping to cross the Absaroka Range at Togwotee Pass, a mountain pass expedition guide Jim Bridger knew about. Meanwhile, Maynadier led his party back north to the Bighorn River to explore it and its associated tributary streams more thoroughly. The plan was for the two parties to reunite on June 30, 1860, at Three Forks, Montana, so they could make observations of a total solar eclipse forecast for July 18, 1860. Hampered by towering basaltic cliffs and deep snows, Raynolds attempted for over a week to reconnoiter to the top of Togwotee Pass, but was forced south due to the June 30 deadline for reaching Three Forks. Bridger then led the party south over another pass that Raynolds named Union Pass, to the west of which lay Jackson Hole and the Teton Range. From there the expedition went southwest, crossing the southern Teton Range at Teton Pass and entering Pierre's Hole in present-day Idaho. Though Raynolds and his party managed to get to Three Forks at the scheduled date, Maynadier's party was several days late, too late to allow a detachment to head north to observe the solar eclipse. The reunited expedition then headed home, traveling from Fort Benton, Montana to Fort Union near the Montana-North Dakota border via steamboat. They then journeyed overland to Omaha, Nebraska where the expedition members were disbanded in October 1860.

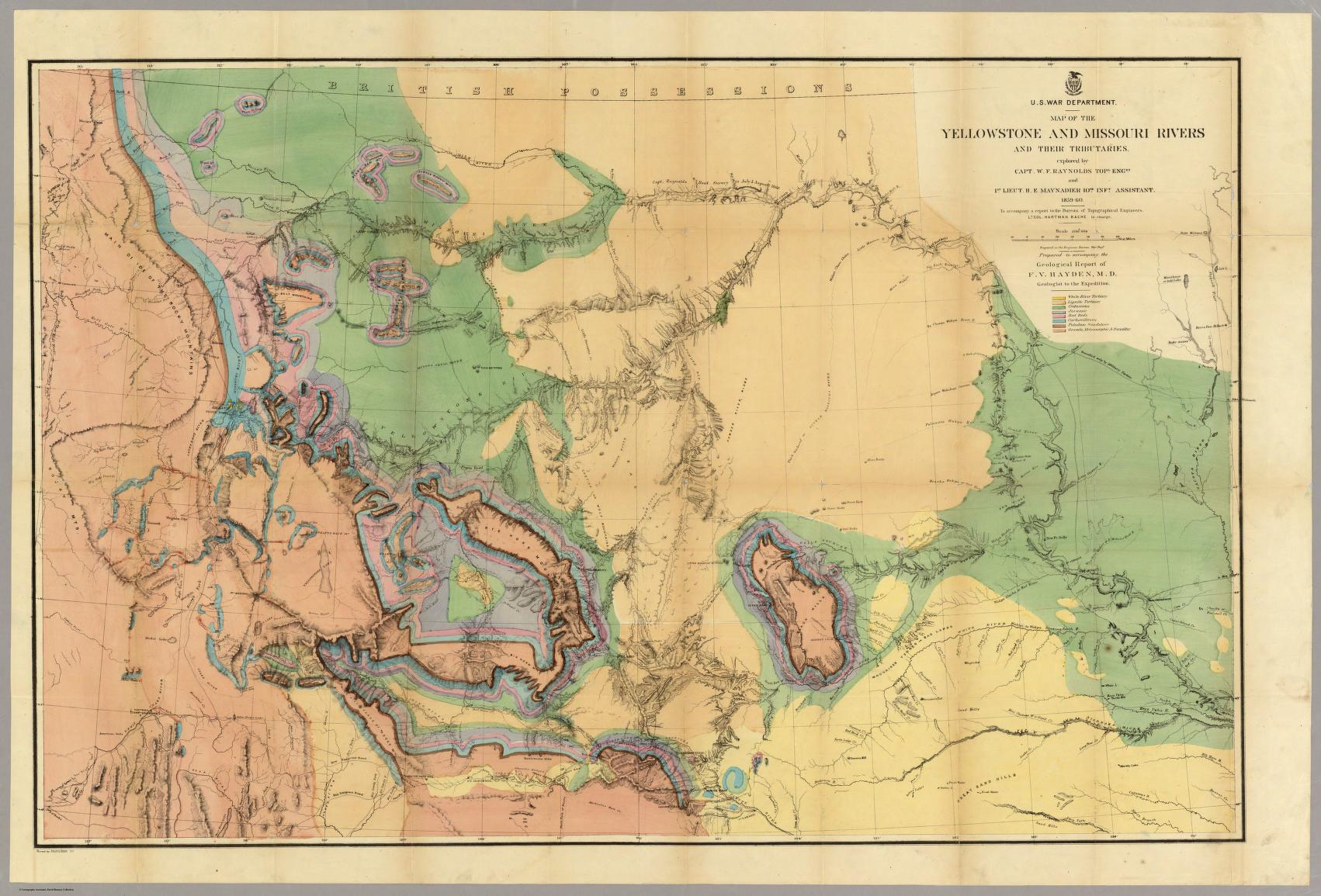
Hayden's geological map from the expedition that was published in 1869

Though the Raynolds Expedition was unsuccessful in exploring the region that later became Yellowstone National Park, they were the first U.S. Government sponsored party to enter Jackson Hole and observe the Teton Range. The expedition also covered over 2,500 miles (4,000 km) and explored an area of nearly 250,000 square miles (650,000 km^{2}). In a preliminary report sent east in 1859, Raynolds reported that the once abundant bison were being killed for their hides at such an alarming rate, that they might soon become extinct. The outbreak of the American Civil War and a severe illness afterwards delayed Raynolds from presenting his report on the expedition until 1868. The Raynolds Expedition did not gain the attention it may have due to the outbreak of the Civil War in 1861. Overshadowed by subsequent larger events where the nation's objectives were turned away from western exploration and expansion, the geological, cartographical and historical importance of the expedition nearly vanished into obscurity. Botanical collections, as well as fossils and related specimens that were to be sent to the Smithsonian Institution were delayed from being studied and much of the artwork created by Hutton and especially Schönborn was lost, though several of Schönborn's chromolithographs appeared in F.V. Hayden's 1883 report that was submitted after later expeditions.

== Command structure ==
-Captain William F. Raynolds, United States Topographical Engineers, commanding.

-First Lieutenant Henry Eveleth Maynadier, United States Army, second in command.

- 2nd United States Infantry Regiment.
  - Detachment, 30 men, Second Lieutenant Caleb Smith.
- 2nd United States Dragoons (replaced the Infantry escort in early 1860)
  - Detachment, 30 men, Second Lieutenant John Mullins.
- Scientists, 2 men, doctor Ferdinand Vandeveer Hayden, Mr. J. Hudson Snowden.
- Technicians, 8 men, Anton Schönborn
- Laborers, 7 men.
- Photographer, James D. Hutton.
- James Stevenson
- Thomas Moran
- William Henry Jackson
- Guide, James Felix (Jim) Bridger.
- Sioux Interpreter, Zephyr Recontre.
