= Joseph Bridger =

English-born military officer, merchant, planter and politician (1631–1686)

Joseph Bridger I

Member of the Virginia Governor's Council
- In office 1673-1686

Member of the House of Burgesses for Isle of Wight County, Colony of Virginia
- In office 1662-1670 Serving with Richard Hill, Nicholas Hill, Robert Williamson
- Preceded by: Robert Pitt
- Succeeded by: position vacant
- In office 1658 Serving with John Bond, John Brewer, Thomas Tabenor
- Preceded by: Nicholas Smith
- Succeeded by: Robert Pitt

Personal details
- Born: c. February 1632 Woodmancote Manor, Dursley Parish, Gloucestershire, England
- Died: April 15, 1686 White Marsh Plantation, Isle of Wight County Colony of Virginia
- Resting place: St. Luke's Church, Smithfield, Isle of Wight County
- Spouse: Hester Pitt
- Children: 7 including sons Samuel, William and Joseph II (disinherited)
- Parent(s): Samuel and Mary Bridger
- Occupation: military officer, merchant, planter, politician

Joseph Bridger (1632 – April 15, 1686) was an English-born military officer, merchant, planter and politician. He emigrated from England to the colony of Virginia, where Bridger became wealthy and well-known for supporting Governor William Berkeley and his successors. As would his namesake grandson and several other descendants, Bridger served in the House of Burgesses representing Isle of Wight County. Bridger also served in the legislature's upper house, the Virginia Governor's Council, and led troops against the rebels during Bacon's Rebellion in 1676 as well as in 1682, when he helped suppress the tobacco cutters (although he had sympathetized with a similar solution nearly two decades earlier).

== Early life and education ==
Born in Woodmancote manor in Gloucestershire, England in the winter of 1631/2 and baptized in Dursley parish in late February, he was the third son of Samuel Bridger, auditor for the College of Gloucester, who died in 1650. His grandfather, Rev. Lawrence Bridger, served as the rector of Slimbridge parish for 55 years and was a fellow of Magdalen College, Oxford University. However records of the location of the education of this man have been lost.

== Career ==
Bridger was a merchant who imported wine and other products for sale in Virginia, possibly even before he emigrated to the colony. Although landless when he emigrated, Bridger accumulated more than 9500 acres of land in the colony, which he distributed among most of his children upon his death, as discussed below. He also probably became one of the ten wealthiest Virginians of the era, and built a 15 room manor house on the Whitemarsh plantation in Isle of Wight County, where he lived. At least one brother and other near relatives also emigrated to the colony, including members of the Driver, Holladay and Pitt families.

Isle of Wight voters elected Bridger as one of their representatives in the Virginia House of Burgesses in 1658, but he was not re-elected until his father-in-law Robert Pitt (who had succeeded him as a burgess in 1659), retired in 1662. While a burgess, particularly after succeeding his father-in-law during what came to be criticised as the Long Assembly (1661-1676, when Gov. Berkeley refused to call for elections for 15 years), Bridger participated in boundary discussions between Virginia and the neighboring Maryland and North Carolina colonies. He also served on a commission that sought to cease tobacco planting during the 1667-1668 season due to an oversupply following the end of the Anglo-Dutch War and very low tobacco prices.

In 1670, Bridger was nominated to the Virginia Governor's Council, the legislature's upper house, and resigned his seat as a burgess, as was required at the time. However, a surviving document indicates the appointment was questioned, and not approved until 1673, from which time Bridger continued as a Councillor until nearly his death. During the interval, Bridger also commanded the colony's militia in the southern counties. Moreover, in 1673, he and his father-in-law Col. Robert Pitt had a disagreement concerning land formerly owned by Capt. John Upton, and Bridger asked that the matter be settled by a jury. The result is unknown, for Pitt's will was admitted to probate the following January. Bridger also became customs collector for the Lower District of the James River, a lucrative position, at least by the summer of 1675.

Meanwhile, during Bacon's Rebellion in 1676, Bridger allied with Governor Governor William Berkeley. He led government troops against the rebels and was one of Berkeley's intimates most loathed by the rebels. Bridger temporarily fled to Maryland because of the many threats against him, and rebels occupied his plantation. He returned and according to an official report "was very active & Instrumental" in "Reducinge to their obedience the south part of James River" despite plundering of his own property "to a good value." He later made claims for damages sustained, including slaughtered livestock.Before his death Bridger was the colony's adjutant general (leading all the colony's troops) although with the title of "colonel" as customary at the time.

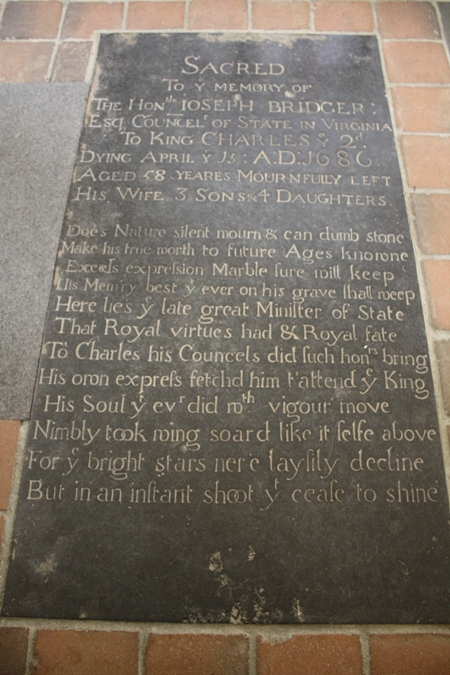

In 1683, the year in which he wrote his will eventually admitted to probate, Bridger was building houses in Jamestown, presumably reflecting the royal decree requiring councillors to do so, and on November 25, 1692 (long after his death), the Council of State met in one of those accommodations. Moreover, the litigation concerning the former Upton property did not badly disrupt relations with other Pitt family members, for Bridger in 1680 sold John Pitt his interest in land he and two others had patented in 1664, and when adding a codicil to his will in October 1683 to disinherit his namesake son, he named his wife as executrix and asked that she be assisted by Thomas and John Pitt and Arthur Smith.

One source states Bridger briefly served as a co-acting Colonial Governor of Virginia in 1684 and 1685. The custom of the time made the council's longest serving member the acting governor during the royal governor's absence.

== Personal life ==
Around 1654, Joseph Bridger married Hester Pitt, daughter of Colonel Robert Pitt who had emigrated to Isle of Wight County from Bristol, England. Their children were:

- Capt. Joseph II (ca. 1654 - by 1713/4) who married Elizabeth Norsworthy
- Martha (ca. 1658 - 1714), married Thomas Godwin
- Col. Samuel (ca. 1663 - by 1713), married Elizabeth Godwin
- Col. William (ca. 1668 -1730), married Elizabeth Allen Caufield
- Elizabeth (ca. 1665 - 1717), married Thomas Lear
- Mary (ca 1667 - ), married Capt. Richard Tibboth
- Hester (1665 - ca. 1722), married George Williamson

== Death and legacy ==
Bridger died in mid-April 1686, on his plantation in Isle of Wight County, about a year after executing a codicil to his will which disinherited his namesake eldest son for his profligate lifestyle.) He was interred on his property, but in 1894 family members reburied some of his remains (and gravestone shown above) near the altar of St. Luke's Church in Smithfield, Virginia. That church is now Virginia's oldest church building (and a museum, although also used occasionally as a place of worship by various denominations). Although local legend dates the parish to 1632, research now indicates the building was completed in the late 1680s. Bridger had helped finance the church and also imported artisans from England).

Several of Bridger's descendants also served in the House of Burgesses, including James Bridger (burgess), who served as an Isle of Wight burgess in the last sessions of the House of Burgesses, as well as in the first Virginia Revolutionary Convention.

In 1738, a slave unearthed a cache of money minted during the reigns of Elizabeth I, James I and Charles I on what had been Bridger's former plantation. The printer of the Williamsburg Gazette (slightly upriver) speculated that the money had either been hidden during Bacon's Rebellion or that Bridger had confiscated it and kept it for himself and his family.

His great grandson (William's son) Joseph Bridger (burgess 1758-61) docked the entail at Whitemarsh and Curawayoak in order to sell the property and use the proceeds to purchase slaves.

In 2007, descendants gave permission to the Smithsonian Institution to unearth Bridger's grave and examine his remains. Only about one-fifth of the corpse was unearthed, so in 2023, family members gave permission for another exhumation, this time of Anne Randall, who was originally buried next to Joseph Bridger on his plantation. Her body was also moved to St. Luke's at the same time that Bridger's body was moved. Anne Randall was the aunt by marriage of Joseph Bridger's wife Hester Pitt Bridger. It is likely that the ledger stone originally intended for Hester was used for Anne Randall because she died ten years after Joseph Bridger died. Bridger's bones contained seven times the amount of lead in modern corpses, which scientists attributed to him eating using pewter tableware, pewter containing lead which could leach out and produce lead poisoning.

== See also ==
Among Governor Bridger's descendants were:

- Jim Bridger, mountain man and explorer of the American Northwest
- Robert Rufus Bridgers, North Carolina politician of the Civil War era
- Bridger family of Virginia
