= Luther B. Bridgers =

American songwriter and minister (1884-1948)

Luther B. Bridgers (February 14, 1884 – May 27, 1948) was an American songwriter and minister. He was an eleventh lineal descendant of Lawrence Bridger (1550-1630), Rector of St. John the Evangelist Church in Slimbridge, Gloucestershire, UK.

Luther Burgess Bridgers was born on February 14, 1884, in Margarettsville, North Carolina to Rev. James Buchanan Bridgers (1856-1913) and Georgiana nee Cooke. Luther's father conducted revival meetings until his death, often with his son assisting him, from 1904 to 1913. From 1902 to 1906 Luther B. Bridgers attended Asbury College in Wilmore, Kentucky where he met his wife Sarah Jane "Sallie" Veatch (1885-1911) with whom he had three sons. He was ordained in the Methodist Episcopal Church, South and pastored his first congregation in Perry, Florida, from 1908 to 1909 which he eventually relinquished in favor of itinerant evangelism throughout the southeastern United States. A gifted singer, Bridgers also penned a number of hymns, the most famous being "He Keeps Me Singing" which was first published Charles D. Tillman's The Revival hymnal #6 in March, 1910. The tune was derived from "Melody of Love," a popular song of the day, written by Hans Engelmann in 1903.

On March 26, 1911, while Bridgers' wife and children were visiting her parents in Harrodsburg, Kentucky, they were killed in a house fire. It has often been misreported that from this tragedy, Bridgers wrote the words and music for "He Keeps Me Singing." Undoubtedly, the song took on a greater poignance after the incident, as Bridgers continued to grow in reputation as a powerful preacher in revival meetings throughout the South.

In 1914 he was named General Evangelist by the Methodist Episcopal Church, South and married Aline Winburn with whom he sired Luther B. Bridgers, Jr (1915-1992). In the years immediately following World War I Bridgers took part in missionary outreaches to Belgium, Czechoslovakia, Poland, and Russia. In 1921 Asbury College awarded Bridgers an honorary Doctorate of Divinity for his greatly successful evangelistic work.

The song "He Keeps Me Singing" has been recorded by the likes of Slim Whitman, Jake Hess, and Babbie Mason.

From 1932 to 1944 Bridgers pastored several Methodist churches in the Atlanta, Georgia area, then briefly at a Methodist church in Morehead, North Carolina. In declining health, he relocated to Gainesville, Georgia where he died May 27, 1948.
