= Bridger Mountain =

Mountain in West Virginia, United States

Coordinates: 38.2243°N 80.1295°W

Bridger Mountain is a ridge in the U.S. state of West Virginia.

Bridger Mountain was named for pioneers James and John Bridger who were murdered by Indians near that point.
