= New Fort Pierre =

Coordinates: 44°24′55.84″N 100°23′9.78″W

Fort Pierre (1859 - 1863) was a fort located in Dakota Territory, later renamed New Fort Pierre. The site was located 3 1/2 miles north of the site of the original Fort Pierre Chouteau near Pierre, South Dakota. The fort was established by the American Fur Company to replace Fort Galpin, 1 mile (1.6 km) away, which was abandoned soon afterwards. New Fort Pierre was smaller than Fort Pierre Chouteau. A garrison was deployed here in 1862-63 during the American Civil War.
