= Jim Bridger =

American explorer (1804–1881)

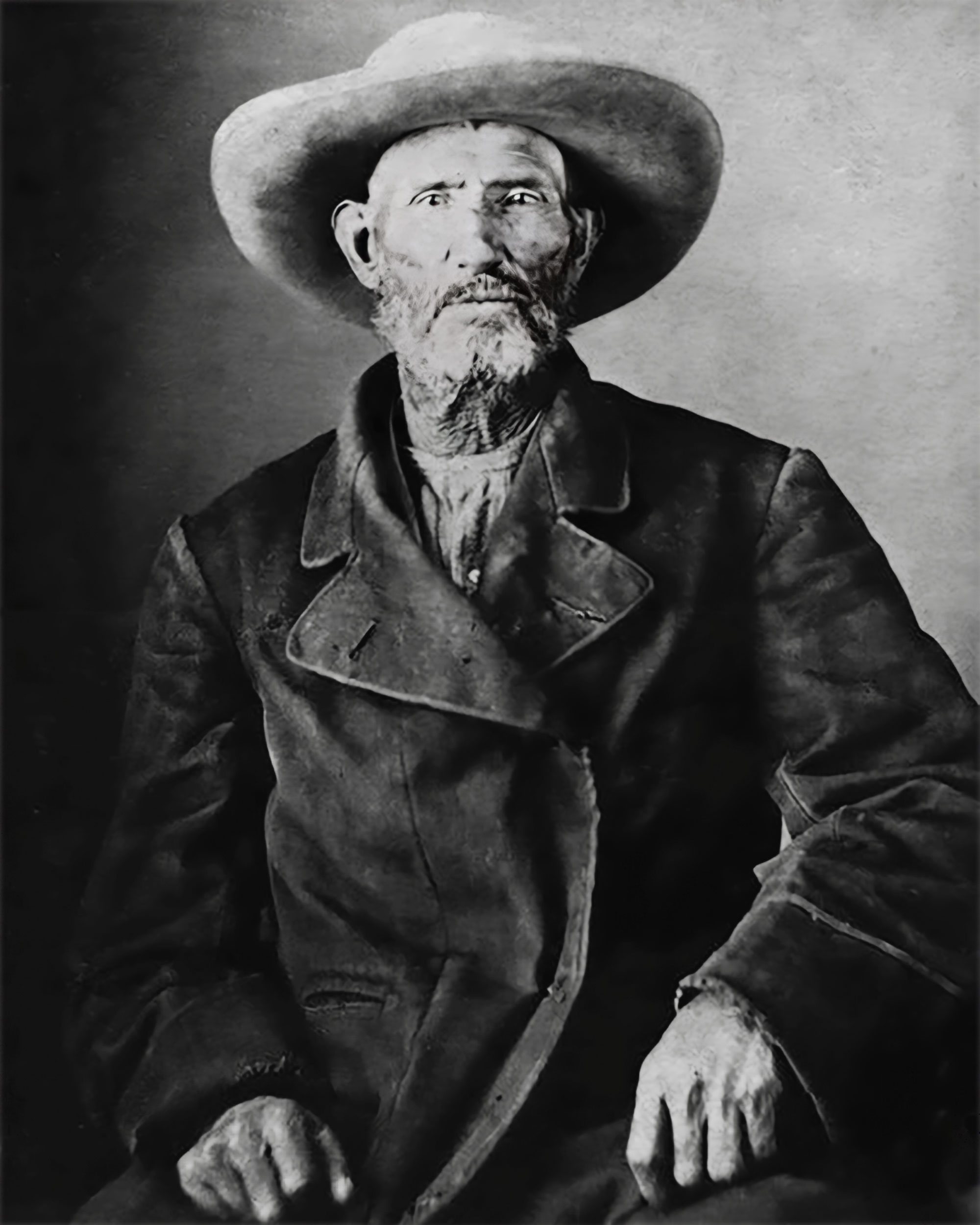
- Bridger, c. 1876
- Born: James Felix Bridger; March 17, 1804; Richmond, Virginia, U.S.
- Died: July 17, 1881 (aged 77); Kansas City, Missouri, U.S.
- Other names: Casapy (Blanket Chief - from the Crow Tribe), Gabe
- Occupations: Frontiersman, explorer, hunter, trapper, scout, guide
- Employer(s): Rocky Mountain Fur Company, U.S. Government
- Known for: Famous mountain man of the American fur trade era
- Spouse(s): Three Native American wives: one Flathead and two Shoshone
- Children: 5
- Military career
- Allegiance: United States
- Branch: United States Army
- Service years: 1859–1868
- Rank: Scout
- Units: 2nd United States Infantry Regiment; 2nd United States Dragoons
- Conflicts: Utah War; Raynolds Expedition; Red Cloud's War

James Felix Bridger (March 17, 1804 – July 17, 1881) was an American mountain man, trapper, Army scout, and wilderness guide who explored and trapped in the Western United States in the first half of the 19th century. He was known as Old Gabe in his later years. He was from the Bridger family of Virginia, English settlers who had arrived in North America in the early colonial period.

Bridger was of the second generation of American mountain men and pathfinders who followed the Lewis and Clark Expedition of 1804–1806. He participated in early expeditions into the west and mediated between Native American tribes and westward-migrating European-American settlers. By the end of his life, he had become the foremost explorer and frontiersman in the American Old West. He had conversational knowledge of French, Spanish, and several indigenous languages; his photographic memory allowed him to map most of the Rocky Mountains from memory.

He was described as "at least six feet tall, straight as an Indian, muscular and quick in movement, but not nervous or excitable; in weight probably 160 pounds; with an eye piercing as the eye of an eagle that seemed to flash fire when narrating an experience." His strong constitution allowed him to survive the extreme conditions in the Rocky Mountains from the Canadian border to what would become southern Colorado.

== Early life ==
James Felix Bridger was born on March 17, 1804, in Richmond, Virginia. His parents were James Bridger, an innkeeper in Richmond, and his wife, Chloe. About 1812, the family moved near St. Louis. At age 13, Bridger was orphaned; he had no formal education, was unable to read or write, and was apprenticed to a blacksmith. Despite eventually speaking at least seven languages, he remained illiterate. On March 20, 1822, at age 18, he left his apprenticeship, responding to an advertisement in St. Louis newspaper the Missouri Republican, and joined General William Henry Ashley's fur trapping expedition to the upper Missouri River. The party included Jedediah Smith and many others who later became known as mountain men. Because he could not read the notice himself, the details of the fur-trapping expedition were relayed to him by word of mouth, prompting him to leave his apprenticeship and join what would become known as "Ashley's Hundred" in 1822.

== Career ==
In 1830, Bridger and several associates purchased a fur company from Smith and others, which they named the Rocky Mountain Fur Company. After dissolving that partnership, Bridger explored the continental interior between the Canada–U.S. border and the southern boundary of Colorado, and from the Missouri River westward to Idaho and Utah, either as a guide or a partner in the fur trade.

=== Hugh Glass ordeal ===
The 19-year-old Bridger was employed by William Henry Ashley in 1823 at the time of the famous bear attack and subsequent abandonment of Hugh Glass, another frontiersman. The event has inspired two feature-length films, Man in the Wilderness (1971) and The Revenant (2016). While scouting for game, Glass was badly mauled by a grizzly bear near the forks of the Grand River in present-day Shadehill, South Dakota. There is debate about whether Bridger was present with the party that Glass was a part of. John Fitzgerald and a man described as "Bridges" stayed, waiting for Glass to die, as the rest of the party moved on. They began digging Glass's grave. Claiming they were interrupted by an Arikara attack, the pair grabbed Glass's rifle, knife, and other equipment and took flight. Bridger and Fitzgerald later caught up with the party and reported to Ashley that Glass had died, even though he had not but rather had miraculously survived. No direct witness ties Bridger to the incident, and Bridger, when asked by a historian later in Bridger's life, denied involvement.

=== Yellowstone and the Great Salt Lake ===
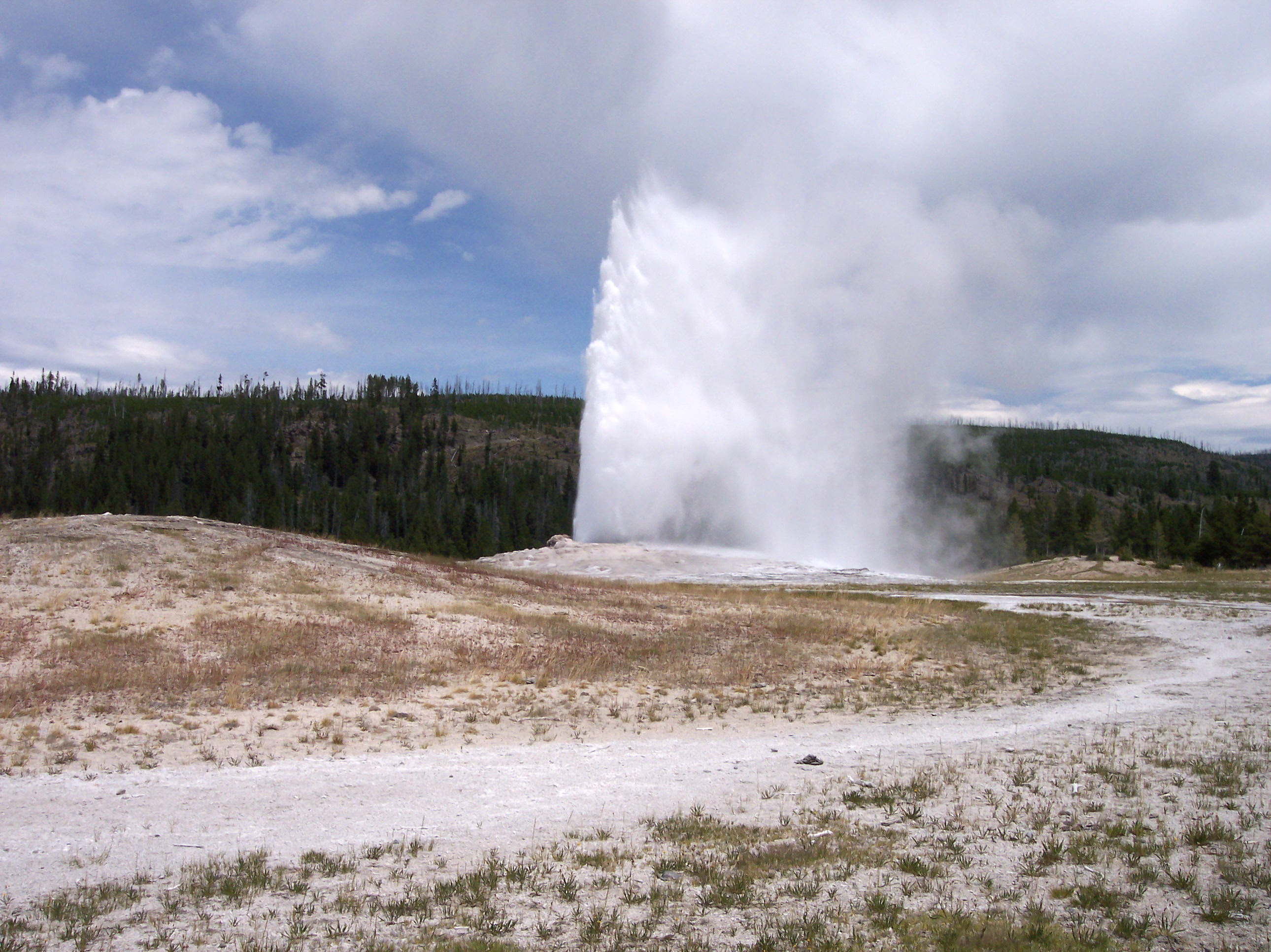
Old Faithful Geyser at Yellowstone

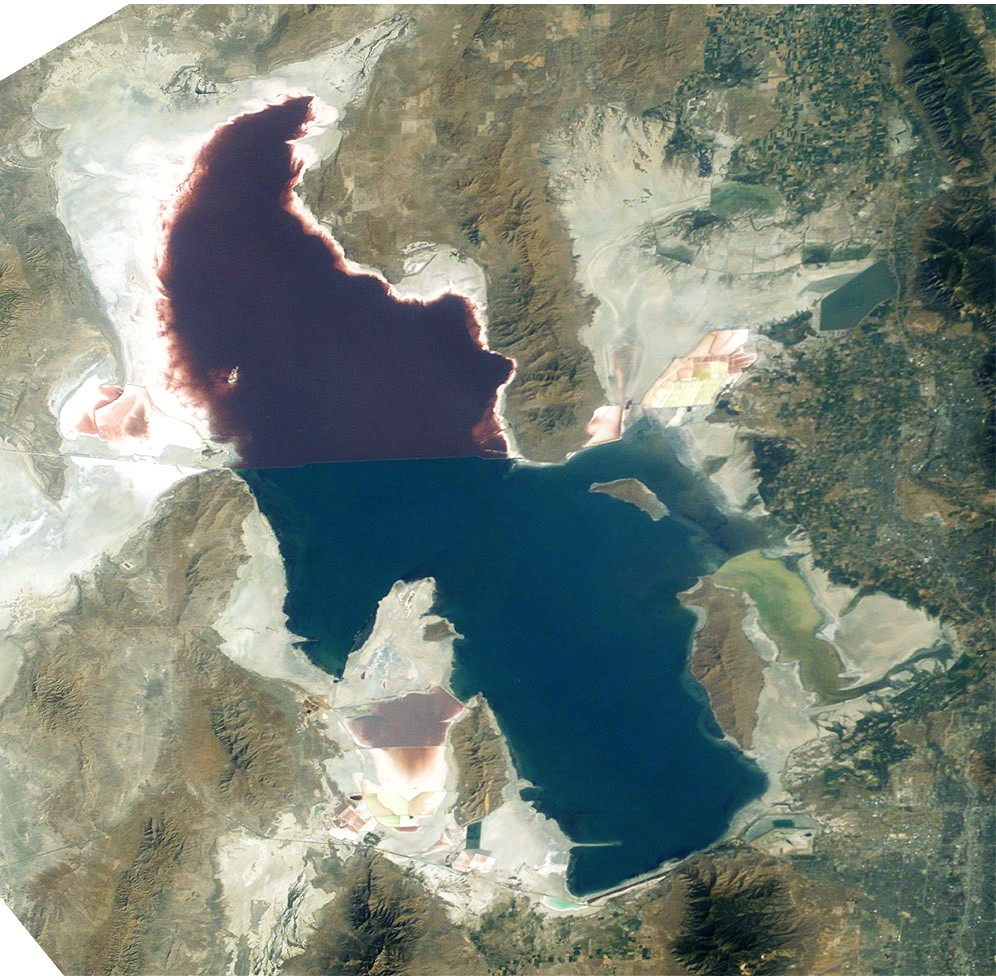
Great Salt Lake

Bridger was among the first non-indigenous people to explore the Yellowstone region. He was the first recorded non-indigenous person to explore Yellowstone's springs and geysers. He shared that a creek south of Yellowstone Lake formed a Parting of the Waters, with one side going to the Pacific Ocean and the other side to the Atlantic Ocean. Bridger took a raft on the rapids at the Big Horn River; he was the only man known to have done this and lived.

In the fall of 1824, Bridger was the first person of European descent to explore the Great Salt Lake region, reaching it by bull boat via the Bear River.

=== Guide and adviser ===
In 1843, Bridger and Louis Vasquez established Fort Bridger on the Blacks Fork of the Green River along the Oregon Trail, in what is now Wyoming.

Bridger had explored, trapped, hunted, and blazed new trails in the West since 1822 and later worked as a wilderness guide. He could reportedly assess any wagon train or group, their interests in travel, and give them expert advice on heading West.

In 1846, the Donner Party came to Fort Bridger and were assured by Bridger and Vasquez that Lansford Hastings' proposed shortcut ahead was "a fine, level road, with plenty of water and grass, with the exception before stated (a forty-mile waterless stretch)". The 40-mile stretch was in fact 80 miles, and the "fine level road" slowed the Donner Party, which became trapped and suffered severe casualties in the Sierra Nevada.

From 16 July 1857 until July 1858, Bridger was employed as a guide during the Utah War. In 1859, Bridger was the chief guide on the Yellowstone-bound Raynolds Expedition, led by Captain William F. Raynolds. Though deep snow prevented them from reaching Yellowstone, the expedition explored Jackson Hole and Pierre's Hole. In 1861, Bridger was a guide for Edward L. Berthoud. From October 1863 until April 1864, Bridger was employed as a guide at Fort Laramie.

Bridger served as a scout under Colonel Henry B. Carrington during Red Cloud's War. Bridger was stationed at Fort Phil Kearny during the Fetterman Fight, and the Wagon Box Fight. Bridger was discharged on 21 July 1868.

Suffering from goiter and rheumatism, Bridger returned to Missouri in 1868. He was unsuccessful in collecting back rent from the government for the lease on Fort Bridger. By 1875, he was blind.

==== Bridger Pass and the Bridger Trail ====
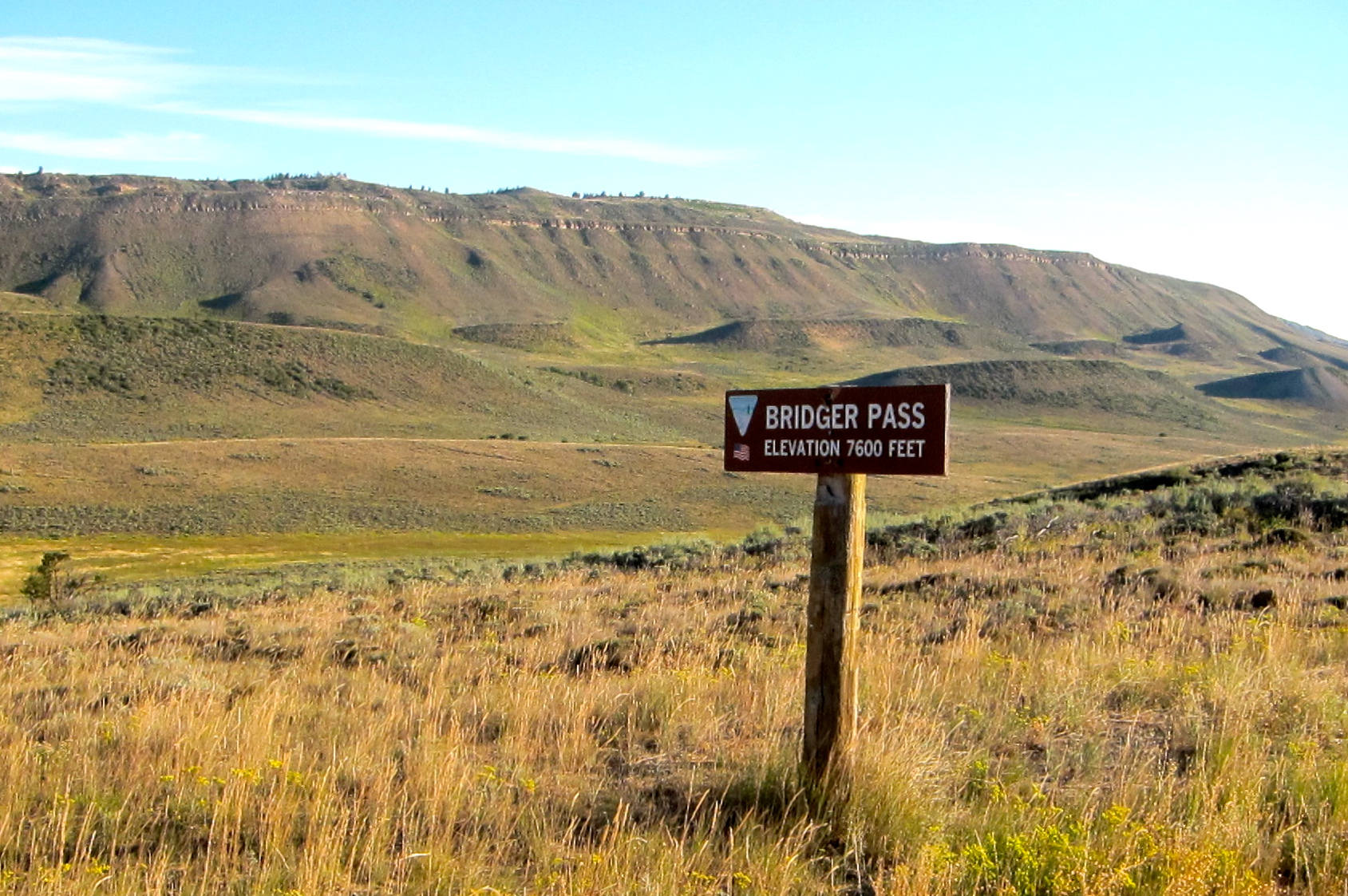
Bridger's Pass

In 1850, while guiding the Stansbury Expedition on its return from Utah, Bridger discovered what became known as Bridger Pass, an alternate overland route that bypassed South Pass and shortened the Oregon Trail by 61 miles. Bridger Pass, in what became south-central Wyoming, later became the chosen route across the Continental Divide, for the Overland Stage, Pony Express, the Union Pacific Railroad Overland Route, and Interstate 80.

In 1864, Bridger blazed the Bridger Trail, an alternative route from Wyoming to the gold fields of Montana that avoided the dangerous Bozeman Trail. In 1865, he served as Chief of Scouts during the Powder River Expedition.

== Family and death ==
In 1835, Bridger married a woman from the Flathead tribe, whom he named "Emma" and with whom he had three children. After she died in 1846 from fever, he married the daughter of a Shoshone chief, who died in childbirth three years later. In 1850, he married Shoshone Chief Washakie's daughter, Mary Washakie Bridger, with whom he raised two children. Some of his children went back east to be educated. His firstborn, Mary Ann, was captured by a band of Cayuse during the Whitman Massacre and died soon after she was released. His son Felix, who fought with the Missouri Artillery, died of sickness on Bridger's farm. His daughter Josephine, who married Jim Baker, also died, leaving his daughter Virginia as his only surviving child. In 1867, while in his early sixties, his eyesight began failing to the point where "he could not shoot very good." By the early 1870s, he was living under Virginia's care and could no longer recognize people unless they spoke. Jim Bridger was blind by 1875.

Bridger died on his farm near Kansas City, Missouri, on July 17, 1881, at age 77.

== Legacy ==
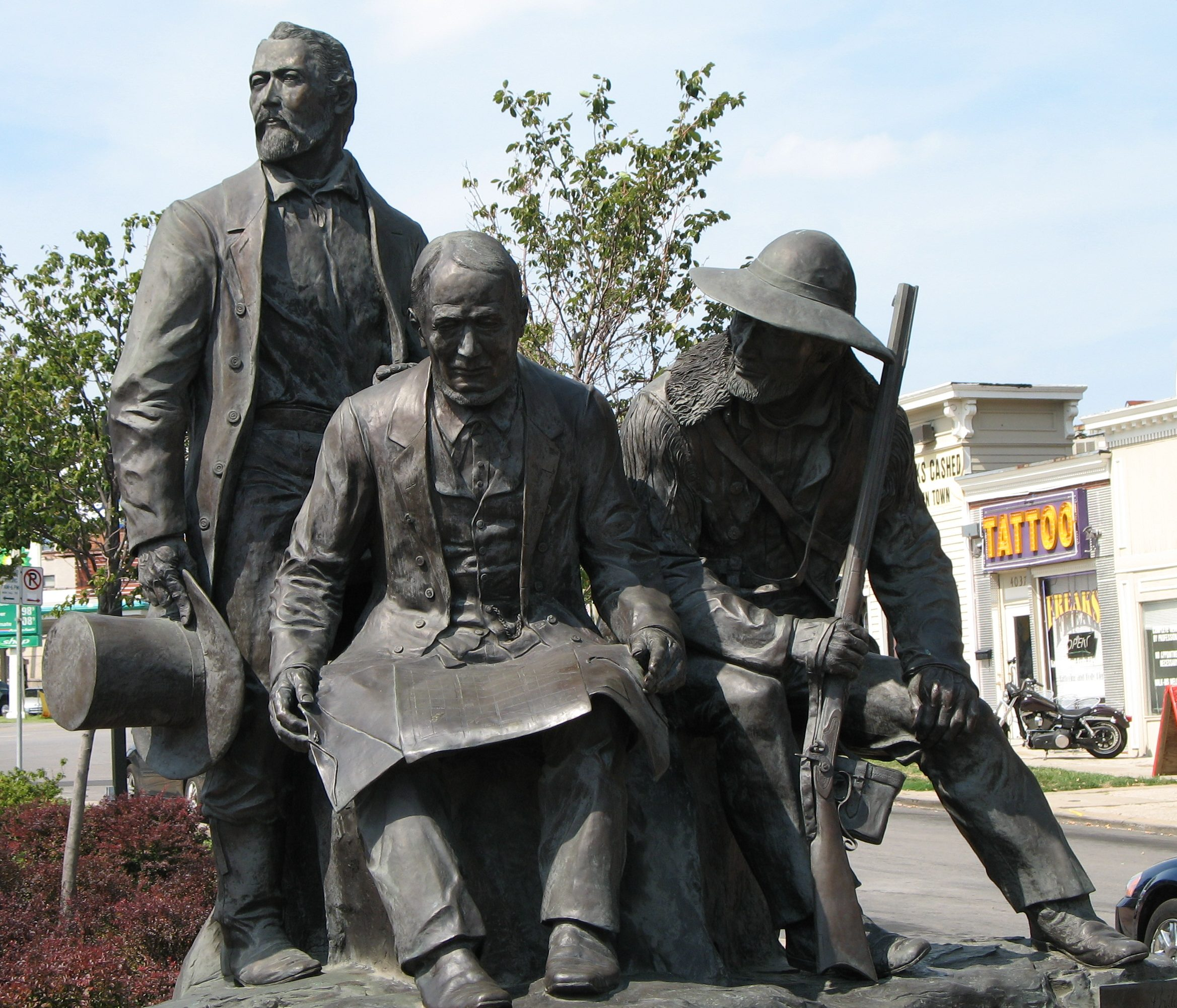
Jim Bridger (right) honored along with Pony Express founder Alexander Majors (left) and Kansas City founder John Calvin McCoy at Pioneer Square in Westport in Kansas City

Bridger is remembered as one of the most colorful and widely traveled mountain men. In addition to his explorations and his service as a guide and adviser, he was known for his storytelling. His stories about the geysers at Yellowstone, for example, proved to be accurate. Others were exaggerated and clearly intended to amuse: one of Bridger's stories involved a petrified forest in which there were "petrified birds" singing "petrified songs" (though he may have seen the petrified trees in the Tower Junction area of what is now Yellowstone National Park). Over the years, Bridger became so associated with tall tales that many stories invented by others were attributed to him. Supposedly one of Bridger's favorite yarns to weave to greenhorns told of his pursuit by one hundred Cheyenne warriors. After he was chased for several miles, Bridger found himself at the end of a box canyon, with the Indians bearing down on him. At this point, Bridger fell silent, prompting his listener to ask, "What happened then, Mr. Bridger?" Bridger would then reply, "They killed me."

=== Places and things named for Jim Bridger ===
- Fort Bridger
- Fort Bridger, Wyoming
- Bridger, Montana
- Bridger, South Dakota
- Bridger Mountains (Wyoming)
- Bridger Range
- Bridger Wilderness
- Bridger Bowl Ski Area
- Bridger–Teton National Forest
- Bridger Pass

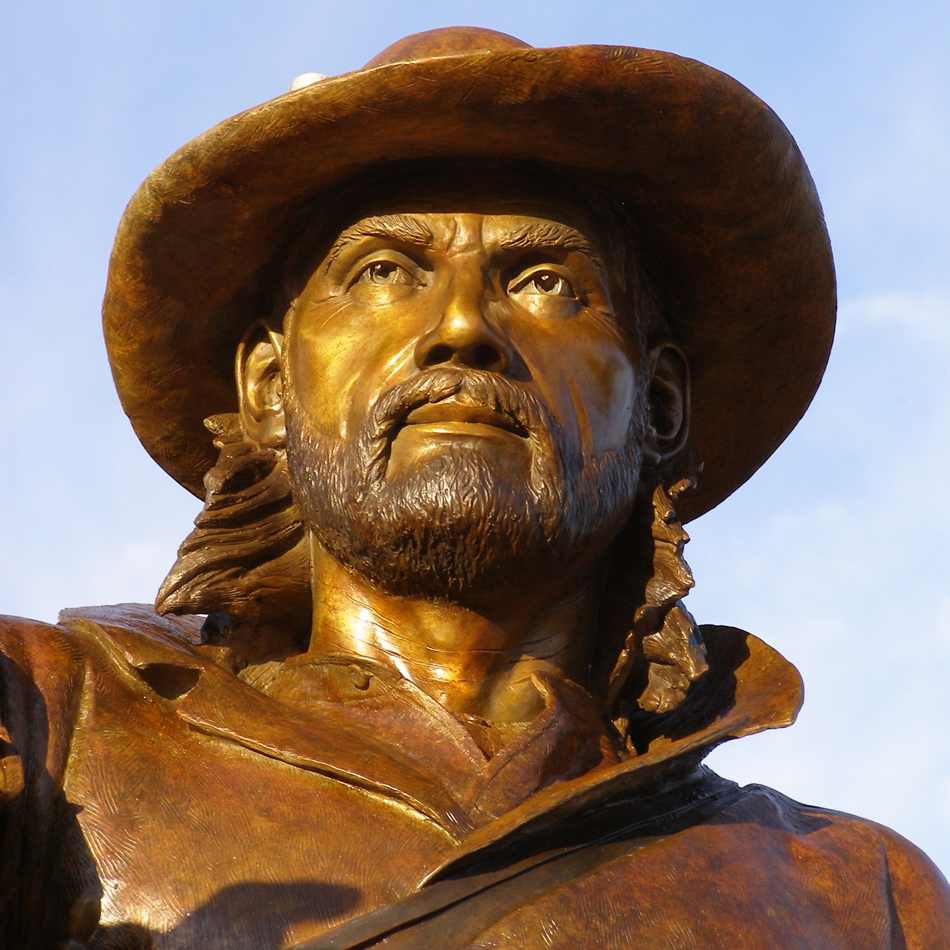
Sculpture of Bridger by David Alan Clark in Fort Bridger, Wyoming

- Jim Bridger Power Station
- Bridgerland in Cache Valley in Utah and Idaho is a name that is used in many Logan, Utah-based businesses and institutions, such as Bridgerland Television and the Bridgerland Technical College.
- In 2013, Bridger's Battle was announced as the new name for an old college football rivalry between Utah State and Wyoming. The winner receives a .50-caliber Rocky Mountain Hawken rifle, the "Bridger rifle", as a traveling trophy.
- Jim Bridger Middle School in North Las Vegas, Nevada.
- James Bridger Middle School in Independence, Missouri
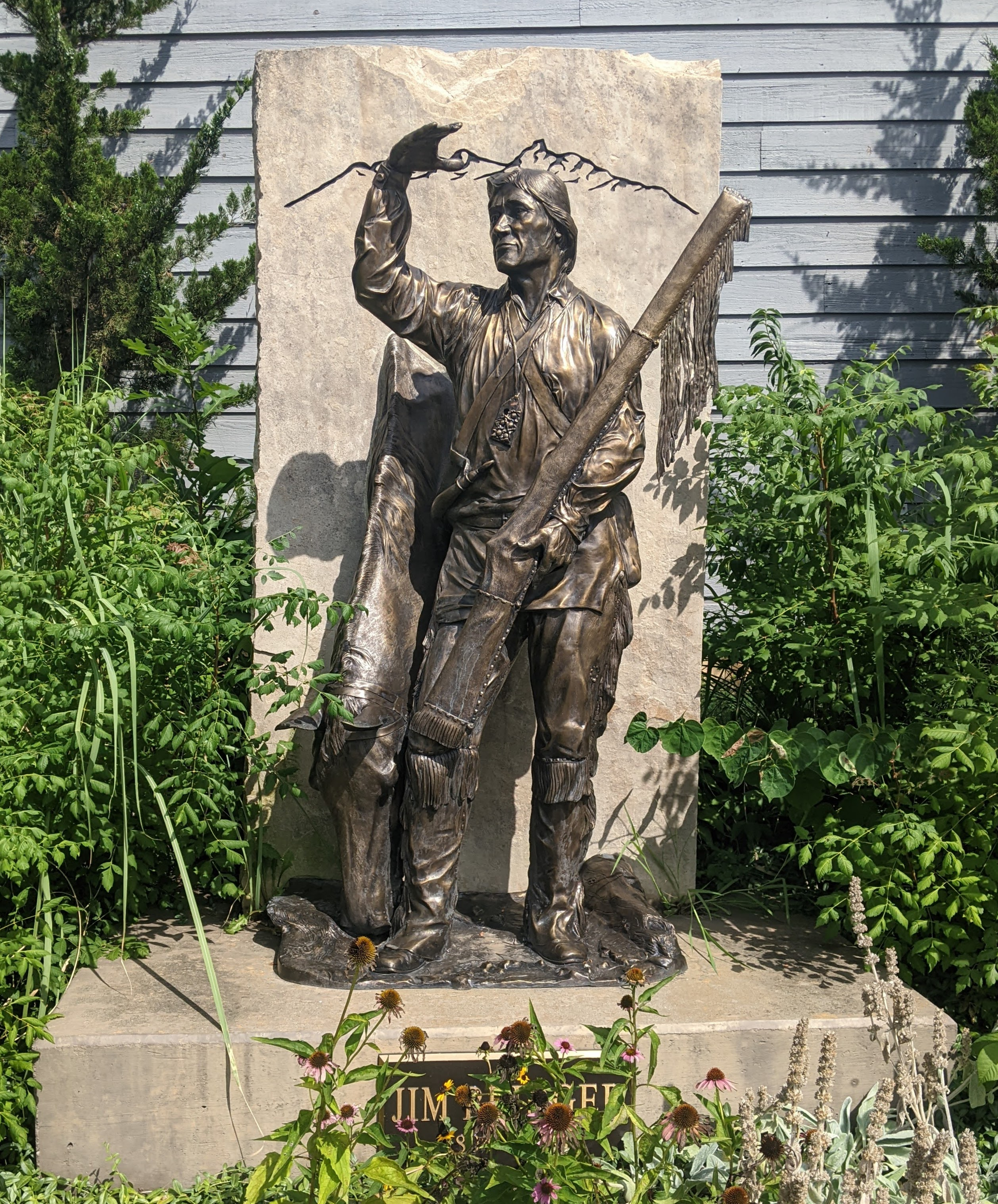
- Statue of Jim Bridger outside of the National Frontiers Museum in Independence, Missouri.
  Bridger Creative Science School (formerly Jim Bridger Elementary School) in Portland, Oregon.

=== Media portrayals ===
- Tully Marshall was Jim Bridger in The Covered Wagon (1923).
- Raymond Hatton portrayed Bridger in the 1940 film Kit Carson.
- Van Heflin portrayed Bridger in the 1951 film Tomahawk.
- Dennis Morgan portrayed Bridger in the 1955 film The Gun That Won the West.
- Harry Shannon portrayed Bridger in the Death Valley Days 1958 episode "Old Gabe". His son Felix was portryed by Ron Hagerthy and Colonel Carrington was portrayed by Roy Engel.
- Karl Swenson portrayed Bridger in the episode "The Jim Bridger Story" of NBC's Wagon Train, broadcast on May 10, 1961.
- James Wainwright portrayed Bridger in the 1976 TV movie Bridger, opposite Ben Murphy as Kit Carson.
- Gregg Palmer portrayed Bridger in the 1977 episode "Kit Carson and the Mountain Man" of NBC's Walt Disney's Wonderful World of Color.
- Reb Brown portrayed Bridger in the 1978 TV miniseries Centennial.
- Brad Pitt portrayed Lt. Aldo Raine, "a direct-descendent of the mountain man Jim Bridger" in the 2009 film Inglourious Basterds
- Will Poulter portrayed a fictionalized version of Bridger in the 2015 film The Revenant.
- Johnny Horton produced an eponymous song about Bridger.
- The Tall Tales of Jim Bridger portrayed dramatized stories about Bridger on INSP
- Shea Whigham portrayed Bridger in the 2025 Netflix miniseries American Primeval
