= Wyoming Highway 295 =

State highway in Big Horn and Park counties in Wyoming, United States

Wyoming Highway 295
- WYO 295 highlighted in red

Route information
- Maintained by WYDOT
- Length: 29.35 mi (47.23 km)
- NHS: Concurrency with US 14 Alt

Major junctions
- South end: WYO 32
- US 14A in Powell
- North end: CR 1NG southwest of Elk Basin

Location
- Country: United States
- State: Wyoming
- Counties: Big Horn, Park

Highway system
- Wyoming State Highway System; Interstate; US; State
← WYO 294	→ WYO 296

Wyoming Highway 295 (WYO 295) is a 29.35-mile (47.23 km) north-south state highway in Big Horn and Park counties in Wyoming, United States, that connects Wyoming Highway 32 (WYO 32), southeast of Garland with Park County Road 1NG (southeast of the Elk Basin oil field, west of Frannie, and just under 2 miles [3.2 km] south of the Montana state line). All but 0.43 miles (0.69 km) of the route are located in Park County; the southernmost intersection on the highway is in Big Horn County. Although predominately a north-south highway, WYO 295 travels east-west for its first 8.7 miles (14.0 km).

== Route description ==
=== Big Horn County to Powell ===
Wyo 295 begins its southern (or eastern) end at WYO 32 (Emblem Highway) in western Big Horn County, southeast of Garland. WYO 295 crosses into Park County at just over three-quarters of a mile (1.2 km) and travels westward till it reaches the community of Willwood at approximately 8.7 miles (14.0 km). Here WYO 295 turns north and is the general direction for the remainder of its course. This highway is an important travel corridor for Powell to Greybull traffic. WYO 295 crosses the Shoshone River just north of Willwood, and reaches the southern city limits of Powell at just over 12 miles (19 km). WYO 295 enters Powell from the south on South Fair Street and curves gently onto East South Street before turning north onto South Bent Street for a short distance. US Route 14 Alternate (US 14A / Coulter Avenue) is met at approximately 12.5 miles (20.1 km). Here WYO 295 turns west to join US 14A for quick one block concurrency before leaving US 14A to head north on North Absaroka Street.

=== Powell to Elk Basin ===
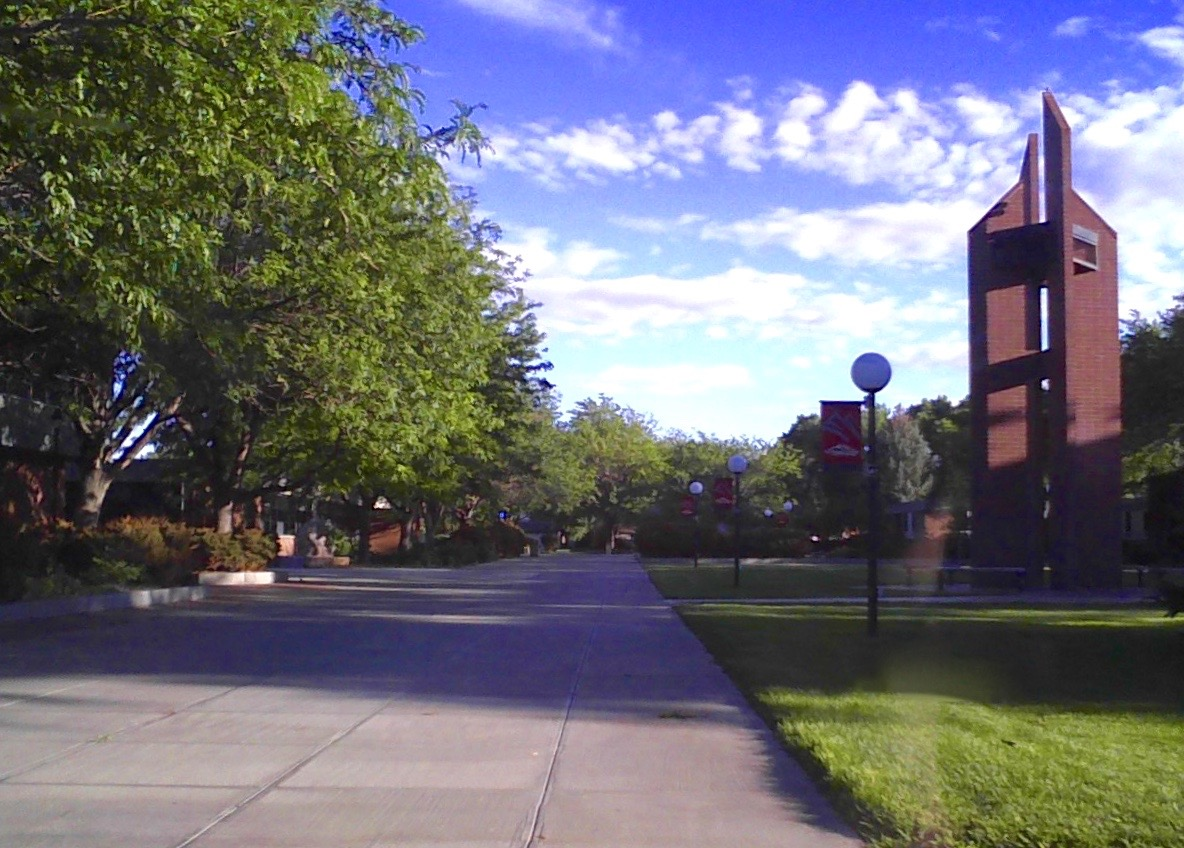
Campus of Northwest College in Powell, July 2015

WYO 295 travels along North Absaroka Street, passing next to Northwest College, before leaving the small city traveling due north. Eight miles (13 km) north of Powell, WYO 295 passes east of the Powell Municipal Airport, a general aviation airport, which can be accessed from the highway. Past the airport, WYO 295 gently turns slightly to the north-northwest and will reach its northern terminus near Elk Basin after 29.35 miles (47.2 km). Elk Basin is an active oil field with hundreds of derricks operating in it. The roadway continues northward as Park County Route 1NG to the Montana state line.

== Major intersections ==
County	Location	mi	km	Destinations	Notes
Big Horn		0.00	0.00	WYO 32 north (Emblem Hwy) – Lovell WYO 32 south (Emblem Hwy) – Emblem	Southern terminus; T intersection
Park	Powell	12.57	20.23	US 14A east (E Coulter Ave) – Garland, Deaver; S Bent St north	Eastern end of US 14A concurrency
Park	Powell	12.64	20.34	US 14A west (W Coulter Ave) – Ralston, Cody	T intersection; Western end of US 14A concurrency
Park		29.35	47.23	CR 1NG	Continuation beyond northern terminus
1.000 mi = 1.609 km; 1.000 km = 0.621 mi

== See also ==
- List of state highways in Wyoming
