= Wyoming Highway 116 =

State highway in Wyoming, United States

Wyoming Highway 116
- WYO 116 highlighted in red

Route information
- Maintained by Wyoming Department of Transportation
- Length: 60.97 mi (98.12 km)

Major junctions
- South end: WYO 450 south of Upton
- US 16 in Upton
- North end: I-90 BL / US 14 in Sundance

Location
- Country: United States
- State: Wyoming
- Counties: Weston, Crook

Highway system
- Wyoming State Highway System; Interstate; US; State
← WYO 114	→ WYO 120

Wyoming Highway 116 (WYO 116) is a 60.97-mile-long (98.12 km) north–south state highway located in central Weston and southern Crook counties of the U.S. state of Wyoming. It travels from WYO 450 south of Upton north to U.S. Route 14 (US 14) in Sundance.

== Route description ==
Wyoming Highway 116 begins its southern end south of Upton on Wyoming Highway 450 approximately half-way in between Wright and Newcastle. Highway 116 heads north through central Weston County, and then turns northeast to Upton. WYO 116 enters Upton from the southwest, and intersects U.S. Route 16 (2nd Street) at approximately 32.5 miles (52.3 km). Highway 116 then turns northwest and overlaps US 16 for a short distance through Upton, before leaving US 16 for its own routing, along Ash Street, toward Sundance.

Route 116 continues to travel northerly, but as it nears the Crook County line, turns east and runs roughly parallel to it before turning north and crossing into Crook County. Highway 116 continues toward Sundance as it travels through the south-central part of the county. Route 116 reaches its northern terminus at 60.97 miles (98.12 km) at I-90 Business and U.S. Route 14 at the western edge of Sundance. Exit 185 on Interstate 90 lies just west of Highway 116's northern terminus and Wyoming Highway 585 can be reached by turning east onto I-90 Business and U.S. Route 14 into Sundance.

== History ==
WYO 116 has had three major routings from 1926 to the present. The first routing of WYO 116 was commissioned around 1926 and was related to old US 116. US 116 traveled from US 310 at Lovell east to US 87E at Ranchester over modern-day US 14A and US 14. The connection would be a short routing along US 87E between Ranchester and Sheridan (Modern-day US 14 between Greybull and Burgess Junction was then known as WYO 416). The first designation lasted only 10 years and was decommissioned in 1936.

In 1936, US 116, WYO 116, and US 420 were redesignated as US 14. WYO 416 then became WYO 520. In 1940, WYO 116 was revived to replace WYO 316 between Midwest–Edgerton and Gillette along modern day WYO 387 and WYO 59. This lasted until 1945, when the current routings of WYO 59 and WYO 387 emerged.

== Major intersections ==
County	Location	mi	km	Destinations	Notes
Weston		0.00	0.00	WYO 450	
Weston	Upton	32.51	52.32	US 16	South end of US 16 concurrency
Weston	Upton	32.81	52.80	US 16	North end of US 16 concurrency
Crook	Sundance	60.97	98.12	I-90 BL / US 14	
1.000 mi = 1.609 km; 1.000 km = 0.621 mi: Concurrency terminus
