= Wyoming Highway 114 =

State highway in Wyoming, United States

Wyoming Highway 114
- WYO 114 highlighted in red

Route information
- Maintained by WYDOT
- Length: 10.82 mi (17.41 km)
- Existed: 1940–present

Major junctions
- South end: US 14A in Garland
- North end: US 310 / WYO 789 in Deaver

Location
- Country: United States
- State: Wyoming
- Counties: Park, Big Horn

Highway system
- Wyoming State Highway System; Interstate; US; State
← WYO 113	→ WYO 116
← WYO 414	→ WYO 430

Wyoming Highway 114 (WYO 114) is a 10.82-mile-long (17.41 km), roughly north–south, Wyoming State Road located in northeastern Park County and extreme northwestern Big Horn County. It provides travels between the communities of Garland and Deaver.

== Route description ==
Wyoming Highway 114 begins its southern end in the community of Garland, a census-designated place (CDP) in northeastern Park County at U.S. Route 14A. WYO 114 heads north-northwest, passing by the Powell Country Club , as it leaves the community. Highway 114 curves north and is paralleled by railroad tracks for a distance before it turns for the last time to head northeast to Deaver. At 9.56 miles (15.39 km), WYO 114 crosses into Big Horn County and quickly enters the town of Deaver. WYO 114 crosses railroad tracks as it reaches its northern end at US 310/WYO 789.

== History ==
Wyoming Highway 114 was once part of U.S. Route 420 (between 1926 and 1936) and Wyoming Highway 420 (between 1936 and 1939). When US 14 was recommissioned to run through Greybull rather than Lovell and Powell in 1940, Wyoming Highway 14 and Wyoming Highway 114 were born. In the mid-1960s, Wyoming Highway 14 was redesignated as Alternate U.S. Route 14 while the WYO 114 designation remains till this day.

== Major intersections ==
County	Location	mi	km	Destinations	Notes
Park	Garland	0.00	0.00	US 14A	Southern terminus of WYO 114
Big Horn	Deaver	10.82	17.41	US 310 / WYO 789	Northern terminus of WYO 114
1.000 mi = 1.609 km; 1.000 km = 0.621 mi
