= Wyoming Highway 33 =

State highway in Big Horn County, Wyoming, United States

Wyoming Highway 33
- Road 9 1/2
- WYO 33 highlighted in red

Route information
- Maintained by WYDOT
- Length: 1.388 mi (2.234 km)

Major junctions
- South end: Road 9 1/2 south-southwest of Lovell
- North end: WYO 32 southwest of Lovell

Location
- Country: United States
- State: Wyoming
- Counties: Big Horn

Highway system
- Wyoming State Highway System; Interstate; US; State
← WYO 32	→ WYO 34

Wyoming Highway 33 (WYO 33), also known as Road 9 1/2, is a 1.39-mile (2.24 km) state highway southwest of Lovell in Big Horn County, Wyoming, United States, that is a southern spur route off Wyoming Highway 32 (WYO 32) and connects the upper Foster Gulch area with WYO 32.

== Route description ==
WYO 33 begins along Road 9 1/2 (a road maintained by the Bureau of Land Management) about 4.25 miles (6.84 km) southwest of Lovell near the upper part of Forester Gulch. From its southern terminus, WYO 33 heads north until it reaches its northern terminus at WYO 32 at a T intersection, about 3 miles (4.8 km) southwest of Lovell. (Northbound WYO 32 heads east, then north toward Lovell and west, then south toward Emblem.)

== Major intersections ==
Actual mileposts along WYO 33 increase from north to south.

The entire route is in Big Horn County.

Location	mi	km	Destinations	Notes
	0.000	0.000	Road 9 1/2 south	Southern terminus; road continues south as a BLM maintained road
	1.388	2.234	WYO 32 north – Lovell WYO 32 south – Emblem	Northern terminus; T intersection
1.000 mi = 1.609 km; 1.000 km = 0.621 mi: Route transition

== See also ==
- List of state highways in Wyoming
