= U.S. Route 14A (Wyoming) =

Section of U.S. Numbered Highway in Wyoming, United States

U.S. Highway 14A
- U.S. Route 14 Alternate; Medicine Wheel Passage
- US 14A highlighted in red

Route information
- Maintained by WYDOT
- Length: 98.600 mi (158.681 km)
- Existed: 1936–present

Major junctions
- West end: US 14 / US 16 / US 20 in Cody
- US 310 / WYO 789 in Lovell
- East end: US 14 at Burgess Junction

Location
- Country: United States
- State: Wyoming
- Counties: Park, Big Horn, Sheridan

Highway system
- United States Numbered Highway System; List; Special; Divided; Wyoming State Highway System; Interstate; US; State
← US 14	→ WYO 14

U.S. Highway 14A (US 14A) is an alternate route for US 14 between Cody and Burgess Junction. At its west end in Cody, US 14 is concurrent with US 16 and US 20. West of Burgess Junction, US 14A passes through the Bighorn Mountains, reaching a maximum elevation of 9,430 feet (2,870 m). This portion of the road is closed during the winter months, which typically is at the end of the fall hunting season, around December 1, to Memorial Day weekend, or as conditions allow. The total length of US 14A is approximately 99 miles (159 km). Intermediate towns on the highway include Powell and Lovell. At Lovell, US 14A is concurrent with US 310 for approximately three miles (4.8 km). US 14A is also known as the Medicine Wheel Passage between Lovell and Burgess Junction.

In the initial 1925 plan, roughly the west half of present US 14A, from Cody to US 310 in Deaver, was assigned the number U.S. Highway 220 (US 220). However, two spurs of US 20 were added in Pennsylvania, and so US 220 became U.S. Highway 420 (US 420) in the final 1926 plan.

Around 1933, US 116 was extended west from Sheridan to Deaver, then absorbing US 420 to end at Cody. Soon after, it became part of an extended US 14. US 14 was shifted south to its present alignment in 1940, and the old alignment became WYO 14 for a while and was recommissioned as US 14A around 1965.

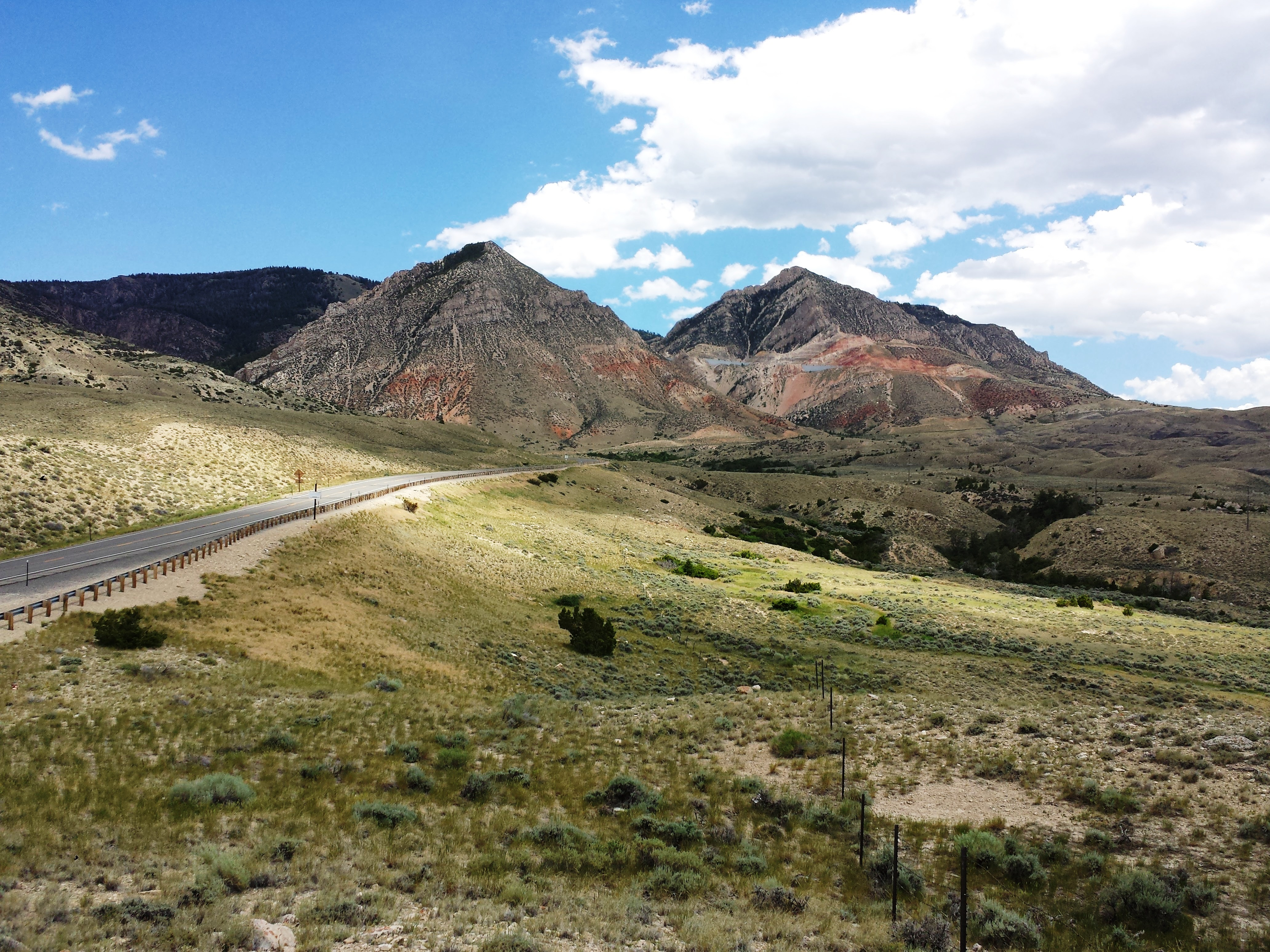
US 14A in the Big Horn Mountains

== Major intersections ==
County	Location	mi	km	Destinations	Notes
Park	Cody	0.000	0.000	US 14 / US 16 / US 20 / WYO 120 south (Sheridan Avenue) / Buffalo Bill Cody Scenic Byway west – Greybull, Yellowstone	Western end of WYO 120 concurrency
Park	Cody	0.436	0.702	WYO 120 north – Clark, Belfry	Eastern end of WYO 120 concurrency
Park		15.400	24.784	WYO 294 north	
Park	Powell	24.040	38.689	WYO 295 north (Absaroka Street)	Western end of WYO 295 concurrency
Park	Powell	24.080	38.753	WYO 295 south (Bent Street)	Eastern end of WYO 295 concurrency
Park	Garland	29.520	47.508	WYO 114 east – Deaver	
Big Horn		43.520	70.039	US 310 west / WYO 789 north – Cowley	Western end of US 310 / WYO 789 concurrency
Big Horn		44.982	72.392	WYO 32 south – Emblem	
Big Horn	Lovell	46.710	75.172	US 310 east / WYO 789 south – Greybull	Eastern end of US 310/WYO 789 concurrency
Big Horn		49.170	79.131	WYO 37 north – Bighorn Canyon National Recreation Area	
Big Horn		68.730	110.610	Eastbound road closure gate (local traffic permitted)	
Big Horn		76.400	122.954	Eastbound road closure gate (closed winters)	
Sheridan	Burgess Junction	98.100	157.877	Westbound road closure gate (closed winters)	
Sheridan	Burgess Junction	98.600	158.681	US 14 – Dayton, Sheridan, Shell, Greybull	
1.000 mi = 1.609 km; 1.000 km = 0.621 mi: Closed/former; Concurrency terminus
