= Wyoming Highway 294 =

State highway in Park County, Wyoming, United States

Wyoming Highway 294
- Badger Basin Road
- WYO 294 highlighted in red

Route information
- Maintained by WYDOT
- Length: 18.82 mi (30.29 km)

Major junctions
- South end: US 14A at Ralston
- North end: WYO 120 east of Clark

Location
- Country: United States
- State: Wyoming
- Counties: Park

Highway system
- Wyoming State Highway System; Interstate; US; State
← WYO 291	→ WYO 295

Wyoming Highway 294 (WYO 294), Badger Basin Road, is a 9.46-mile (15.22 km) southeast-northwest state highway in northeastern Park County, Wyoming, United States, that connects U.S. Route 14 Alternate (US 14A | Powell Highway) on the southwestern edge of Ralston with Wyoming Highway 120 (WYO 120), east of Clark.

== Route description ==
WYO 294 begins its southern end at US 14A on the southwestern edge of the (census-designated place) of Ralston, approximately 8 miles (13 km) southwest of Powell. It begins its journey northward crossing the Garland Canal at three-tenths of a mile (0.48 km) before passing west of the Ralston Reservoir. WYO 294 continues northwesterly through the remote regions of northeast Park County, reaching its northern terminus at Wyoming Highway 120 east of the unincorporated community of Clark 18.82 miles (30.29 km) later.

== Major intersections ==
The entire route is in Park County.

Location	mi	km	Destinations	Notes
Ralston	0.00	0.00	Dutcher Springs Trail east – US 14A	Continuation south, then east from the southern terminus
Ralston	0.00	0.00	US 14A east – Powell US 14A west – Cody, Yellowstone National Park	Southern terminus
	18.82	30.29	WYO 120 north (Belfry Hwy) – Montana state line, Belfry (Montana) WYO 120 south (Belfry Hwy) – Cody, Yellowstone National Park	Northern terminus; T intersection
1.000 mi = 1.609 km; 1.000 km = 0.621 mi

== See also ==
- List of state highways in Wyoming
