= Wyoming Highway 120 =

State highway in Wyoming, United States

Wyoming Highway 120
- WYO 120 highlighted in red

Route information
- Maintained by WYDOT
- Length: 121.96 mi (196.28 km)
- Existed: 1945–present

Major junctions
- East end: US 20 / WYO 789 in Thermopolis
- US 14 / US 16 / US 20 in Cody; US 14A in Cody
- West end: MT 72 at Montana-Wyoming State Line

Location
- Country: United States
- State: Wyoming
- Counties: Hot Springs, Park

Highway system
- Wyoming State Highway System; Interstate; US; State
← WYO 116	→ WYO 130
← WYO 414	→ WYO 430

Wyoming Highway 120 (WYO 120) is a 121.96-mile-long (196.28 km) state highway in central Hot Springs and eastern Park County, Wyoming that travels northwest to Montana Highway 72 at the state line.

== Route description ==
Wyoming Highway 120 begins its east end in Thermopolis at US 20/WYO 789. It heads west on West Broadway Street out of Thermopolis losing the name and heading northwest. As Wyoming Highway 120 heads northwest it intersects Wyoming Highway 170, at just under nine miles, that travels to nearby Hamilton Dome. Further northwest the highway intersects Wyoming Highway 171 at just under 27 miles. WYO 171 travels to nearby Grass Creek. Wyoming Highway 431 is intersected at approximately 33 miles into the route, and it travels east along Gooseberry Creek to US 20/WYO 789 located southwest of Worland.

Wyoming 120 continues heading northwest and leaves Hot Springs County behind and enters Park County from the southeast. Soon it reaches Meeteetse where it intersects with Wyoming Highway 290 (Park Avenue). After leaving Meeteese, WYO 120 intersects no other state highways until it reaches Cody. Highway 120 enters Cody from the south as Meeteetse Highway. It intersects the multiplexed US 14/US 16/US 20 (Greybull Highway) at the foot of Yellowstone Regional Airport. WYO 120 turns west and runs concurrent with the multiplexed routes in downtown Cody that then turns into 17th Street as the highway turns north. At Sheridan Avenue, WYO 120 turns west again with US 14/US 16/US 20. The concurrency with these routes ends one block later at an intersection with the western terminus of US 14A. WYO 120 turns north onto 16th Street and runs concurrent now with US Route 14A. This concurrency ends a half-mile later, as Highway 120 turns west onto Belfry Highway to continue its northwesterly course and to leave Cody, while US 14A heads east.

Wyoming Highway 120 zigzags northwest out of Cody, and at approximately 85.5 miles, it intersects Former Wyoming Highway 293, that used to serve oil fields, state lands, and the Park County airport. This route was turned back to county maintenance in the early 1990s.

The next major highway 120 encounters the eastern terminus of Wyoming Highway 296 (Chief Joseph Scenic Byway) at 101.01 miles into the route. After encountering WYO 296, Highway 120 turns to start heading in a north-northeast direction. At 113.83 miles, WYO 120 intersects the Former Wyoming Highway 292 (Clarks Fork Canyon Road). This route was also turned over to the county highway department for maintenance. A half-mile after, Highway 120 intersects the northern terminus of Wyoming Highway 294 is intersected, which travels southeast to US 14A near Ralston.

Wyoming Highway 120 reaches the Montana-Wyoming State Line at 121.96 miles and ends. The highway continues as Montana Highway 72 as it turns northeast toward Laurel, Montana and US 310.

== History ==
Wyoming Highway 120 emerged in 1945 to replace Wyoming 420 south of Cody and a new road north of Cody.

Wyoming Highway 120 was commissioned to replace Wyoming Highway 420 and the state of Wyoming wanted to use the lowest number available, which was 120. When Wyoming numbered its state primary routes that were spurs of U.S. routes in the 1920s and 1930s, the state hoped to elevate them to U.S. route status. However, after the Great Recommissioning of 1936, Wyoming started to number its state auxiliary routes from the lowest number available.

== Major intersections ==
County	Location	mi	km	Destinations	Notes
Hot Springs	Thermopolis	0.00	0.00	US 20 / WYO 789	Eastern terminus
Hot Springs		8.95	14.40	WYO 170	
Hot Springs		26.73	43.02	WYO 171	
Hot Springs		33.27	53.54	WYO 431	
Park	Meeteetse	52.62	84.68	WYO 290	
Park	Cody	81.86	131.74	US 14 east / US 16 east / US 20 east	East end of US 14/US 16/US 20 concurrency
Park	Cody	84.09	135.33	US 14 west / US 16 west / US 20 west / US 14A begins	West end of US 14/US 16/US 20 concurrency; east end of US 14A concurrency
Park	Cody	84.50	135.99	US 14A east	West end of US 14A concurrency
Park	Cody	85.53	137.65	CR 2AB	Former WYO 293
Park		101.01	162.56	WYO 296	
Park		113.83	183.19	CR 1AB (Clarks Fork Canyon Road)	Former WYO 292
Park		114.56	184.37	WYO 294	
Park		121.96	196.28	MT 72 north	Continuation beyond Montana state line
1.000 mi = 1.609 km; 1.000 km = 0.621 mi
