= Wyoming Highway 32 =

State highway in Big Horn County, Wyoming, United States

Wyoming Highway 32
- Emblem Highway
- WYO 32 highlighted in red

Route information
- Maintained by WYDOT
- Length: 31.48 mi (50.66 km)

Major junctions
- South end: US 14 / US 16 / US 20 west of Emblem
- WYO 295 east-southeast of Powell; WYO 33; south-southwest of Byron
- North end: US 14A / US 310 / WYO 789 west of Lovell

Location
- Country: United States
- State: Wyoming
- Counties: Big Horn

Highway system
- Wyoming State Highway System; Interstate; US; State
← WYO 31	→ WYO 33

Wyoming Highway 32 (WYO 32), also known as Emblem Highway, is a 31.48-mile (50.66 km) state highway in northtwestern Big Horn County, Wyoming, United States, that connects U.S. Route 14 / U.S. Route 16 / U.S. Route 20 (US 14 / US 16 / US 20), west of Emblem, with U.S. Route 14A / U.S. Route 310 / Wyoming Highway 789 (US 14A / US 310 / WYO 789) and County Route R10 (CR R10), west of Lovell.

== Route description ==
WYO 32 begins at T intersection with US 14 / US 16 / US 20, just east of the unincorporated community of Emblem and northeast of the west end of Wyoming Highway 30. (US 14 / US 16 / US 20 heads east through Emblem and on toward Greybull and Basin. US 14 / US 16 / US 20 heads west toward Burnington, Coty, and Yellowstone National Park.)

From its southern terminus, WYO 32 proceeds northwest for just over seven and a third miles (11.8 km) before reaching its junction with the western end of Wyoming Highway 295 (WYO 295) at another T intersection, having crossed over Whistle Creek along the way. (WYO 295 heads west toward Powell.) WYO 32 then proceeds north for nearly 4 miles (6.4 km) as it passes near and parallels the Park-Big Horn county line before briefly passing along the south bank of the Shoshone River.

WYO 32 then proceeds northeast (roughly paralleling the Shoshone River for the remainder of its route) and fairly quickly crosses over Whistle Creek for a second time. After nearly 9 miles (14 km) on the northeasterly course, WYO 32 reaches its junction with the north end of Wyoming Highway 33 (WYO 33 / Road 9 1/2) at still another T intersection. (WYO 33 heads south toward the upper Foster Gulch area.) Shortly after its junction with WYO 33, WYO 32 turns north. About 2.5 miles (4.0 km) later, WYO 32 reaches its northern terminus at an intersection with US 14A / US 310 / WYO 789 (West Main Street) and CR R10, just west of Lovell. (US 14A / US 310 / WYO 789 heads east through Lovell and on toward Greybull. US 14A / US 310 / WYO 789 heads west toward Cowley and Deaver. CR R10 heads briefly north before ending at some residential properties.)

Mileposts increase from north to south along WYO 32.

== Major intersections ==
The entire route is in Big Horn County.

Location	mi	km	Destinations	Notes
	0.00	0.00	US 14 east / US 16 east / US 20 east – Emblem, Greybull, Basin US 14 west / US 16 west / US 20 west – Burlington, Cody, Yellowstone National Park	Southern terminus; T intersection
	7.38	11.88	WYO 295 west (Ln 13) – Powell	T intersection; east end of WYO 295
	28.57	45.98	WYO 33 south (Road 9 1/2)	North end of WYO 33
	31.48	50.66	US 14A east / US 310 east / WYO 789 south (W Main St) – Lovell, Greybull US 14A east / US 310 west / WYO 789 north (W Main St) – Cowley, Deaver	Northern terminus
	31.48	50.66	CR R10 north	Continuation north from northern terminus
1.000 mi = 1.609 km; 1.000 km = 0.621 mi

== See also ==
- List of state highways in Wyoming
