= Ophiomorpha =

Ophiomorpha Temporal range: Early Permian– Recent

Trace fossil classification
- Ichnogenus: †Ophiomorpha

Ichnospecies
- O. nodosa; O. rudis; others...

Trace fossil

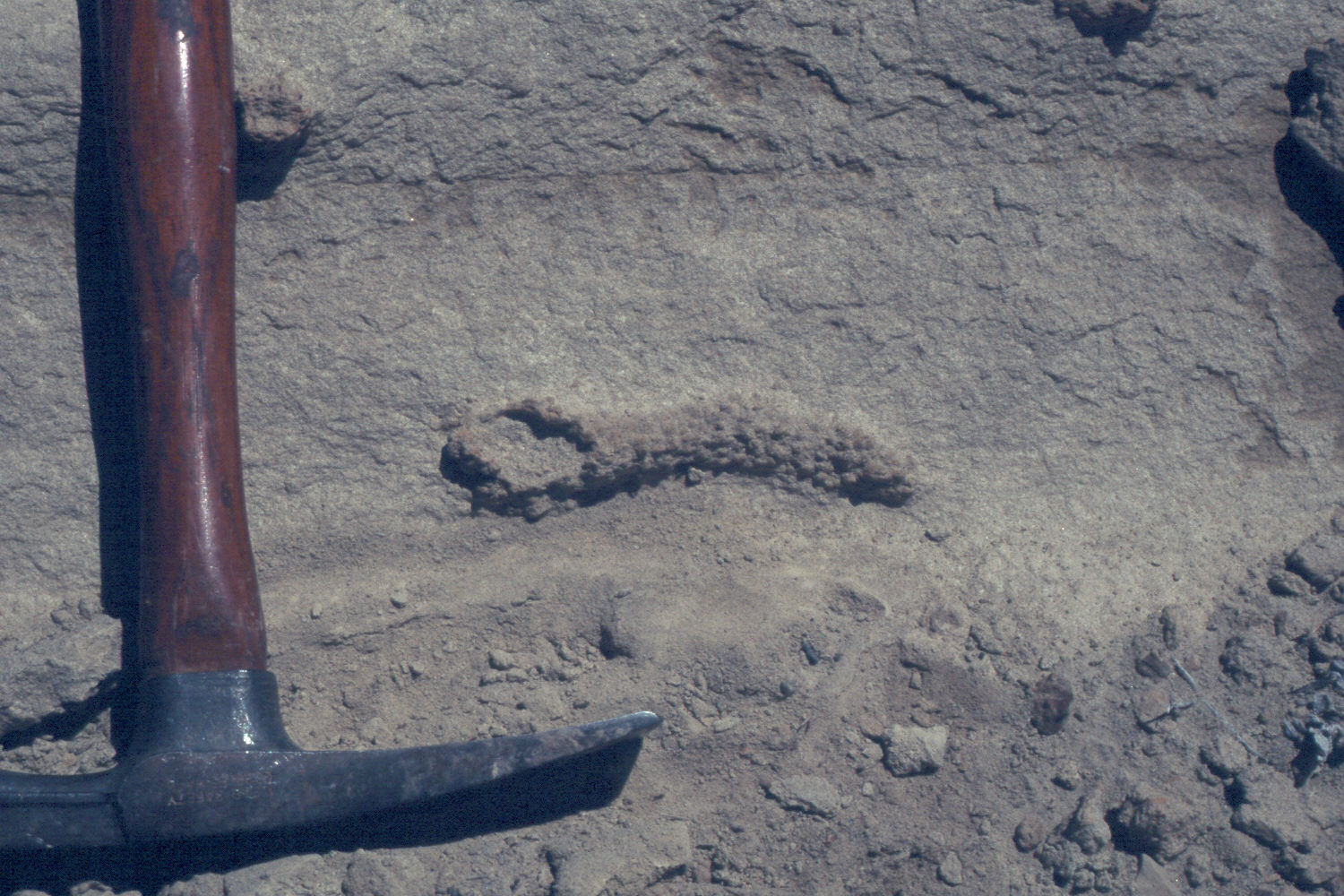
Example of Ophiomorpha in the sandstone of the Parkman Member of the Clagget Formation in Elk Basin on the Montana/Wyoming border

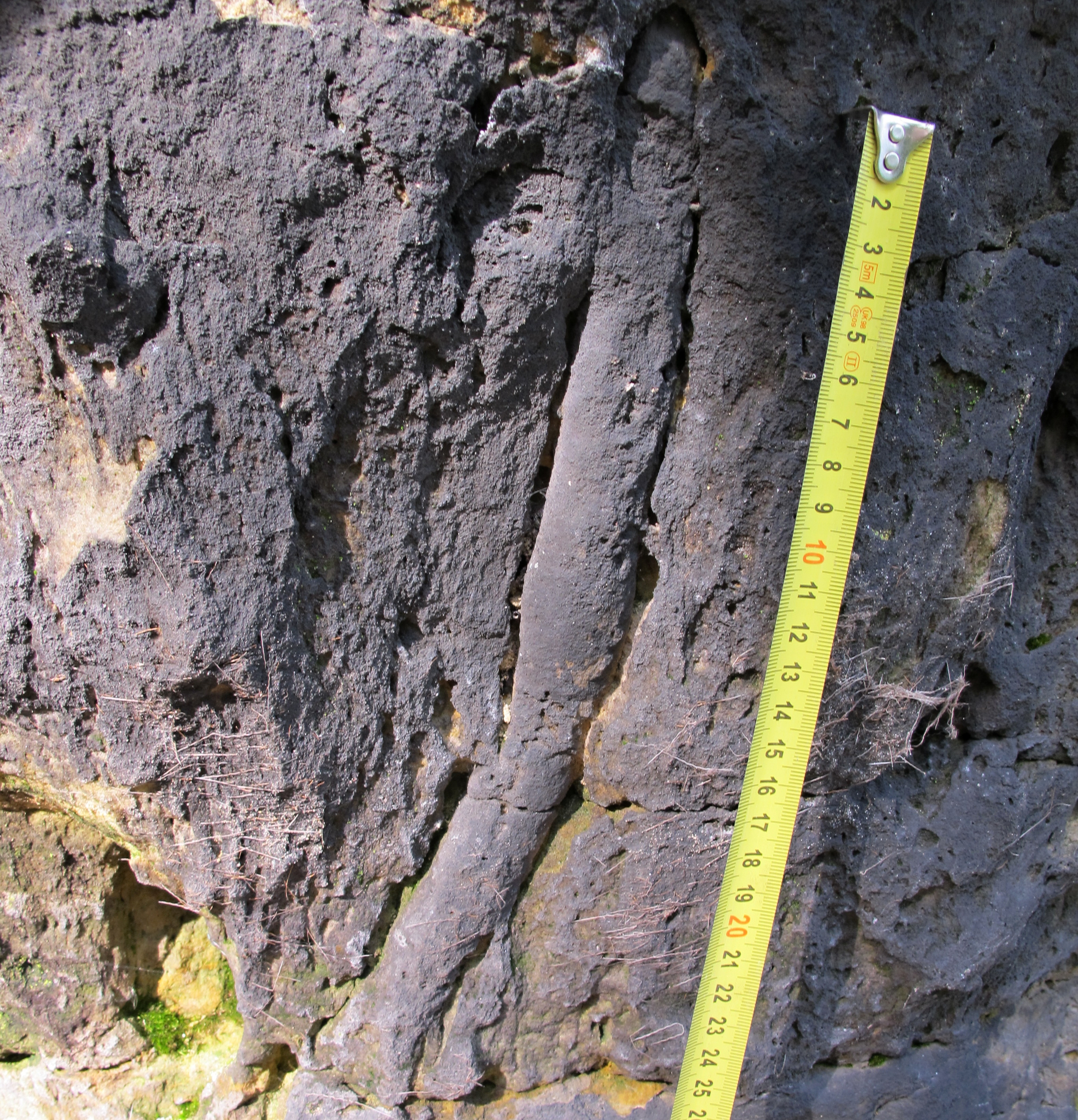
Ophiomorpha in Late Turonian sandstones in Bohemian Cretaceous Basin, near Hřensko in Czech Republic

Ophiomorpha is an ichnotaxon, usually interpreted as a burrow of an organism (specifically a crustacean) living in the near-shore environment. The burrow lining is more or less smooth on the inside, and densely to strongly mammalated or nodose on the outside, due to the packing of nodules for support of the burrow. Branching is irregular but Y-shaped where present. It (particularly O. nodosa) is often considered part of the Skolithos ichnofacies, where it has occurred (i.e. nearshore environments) since the early Permian, though it (particularly O. rudis) has also occurred in deep water settings (Nereites ichnofacies) since the Late Jurassic, such as well-oxygenated turbidites.

More generally Ophiomorpha and other crustacean-generated burrows first become prominent in the Jurassic.

== See also ==
- Trace fossil
- Ichnology
