= Wyoming Highway 450 =

State highway in Wyoming, United States

Wyoming Highway 450
- Little Thunder Road
- WYO 450 highlighted in red

Route information
- Maintained by WYDOT
- Length: 66.22 mi (106.57 km)

Major junctions
- West end: WYO 59 in Wright
- WYO 116
- East end: US 16 in Newcastle

Location
- Country: United States
- State: Wyoming
- Counties: Campbell, Weston

Highway system
- Wyoming State Highway System; Interstate; US; State
← WYO 436	→ WYO 451

Wyoming Highway 450 (WYO 450) is a 66.22-mile-long (106.57 km) east-west Wyoming State Road in Campbell and Weston counties that provides travel between WYO 59 at Wright and U.S. Route 16 (US 16) at Newcastle.

== Route description ==
Wyoming Highway 450 begins its western end in the Town of Wright in Campbell County at Wyoming Highway 59, just south of the eastern terminus of Wyoming Highway 387. Highway 450 heads due east through Thunder Basin National Grassland for much of its length. Nearing 21 miles, WYO 450 leaves Campbell County and enters Weston. The southern terminus of Wyoming Highway 116 is intersected at approximately 36.5 miles (58.7 km). Nearing its eastern end WYO 450 reaches the City of Newcastle, the county seat of Weston County, where it ends at US Route 16.

== Major intersections ==
County	Location	mi	km	Destinations	Notes
Campbell	Wright	0.00	0.00	WYO 59	Western terminus of WYO 131
Weston		36.50	58.74	WYO 116	Southern terminus of WYO 116
Weston	Newcastle	66.22	106.57	US 16	Eastern terminus of WYO 450
1.000 mi = 1.609 km; 1.000 km = 0.621 mi

== See also ==
- List of state highways in Wyoming
- List of highways numbered 450
