= U.S. Route 310 =

Highway in the United States

U.S. Route 310
- US 310 highlighted in red

Route information
- Auxiliary route of US 10
- Length: 107.548 mi (Note: Mileage is a summation of each state's length) (173.082 km) 52.902 mi (85.138 km) in Wyoming; 54.646 mi (87.944 km) in Montana
- Existed: 1926–present

Major junctions
- South end: US 14 / US 16 / US 20 / WYO 789 in Greybull, WY
- US 212 in Rockvale, MT; I-90 in Laurel, MT
- North end: I-90 BL / S-532 in Laurel, MT

Location
- Country: United States
- States: Wyoming, Montana
- Counties: WY: Big Horn, Park; MT: Carbon, Yellowstone

Highway system
- United States Numbered Highway System; List; Special; Divided

U.S. Route 310 (US 310) is a spur of historic U.S. Route 10, now Interstate 90. It runs for 108 miles (174 km) from Greybull, Wyoming to Laurel, Montana. It passes through the states of Montana and Wyoming. US 310 is concurrent with Wyoming Highway 789 for its entirety through Wyoming, along with US 14A for approximately 3 miles (4.8 km) near Lovell, Wyoming.

== Route description ==
US 310 starts at a junction with US 14, US 16, US 20, and Wyoming Highway 789 in Greybull as an unsigned highway and is concurrent with all four routes. It becomes signed five miles (8 km) northwest of Greybull, where it departs from US 14, US 16, and US 20, and continues north through the desert, still concurrent with Wyoming Highway 789. Near the town of Lovell, US 310 passes by Lovell Lakes before turning west through a brief stretch of farmland that extends into Cowley. From Cowley, the highway runs west to Deaver, then due north to Frannie, where it straddles the boundary between Big Horn County and Park County. Just to the north of Frannie, US 310 bends slightly to the west, so that the road is actually inside Park County by about 400 feet before reaching the Montana state line. At the state line, Wyoming Highway 789 ends and US 310 continues northwest into the desert. At the junction with Montana Highway 72, US 310 turns north, passing through farmland and the towns of Bridger and Fromberg before running concurrently with US 212. The highway enters the city of Laurel, where US 212 continues onto I-90 and US 310 ends at Main Street (I-90 Business and former US 10).

== History ==
Historically, US 310 intersected with US 10 at Laurel. After 1986, when US 10 was decommissioned west of West Fargo, North Dakota, US 310 no longer connected to its "parent" route.

== Major intersections ==
State	County	Location	mi	km	Destinations	Notes
Wyoming	Big Horn	Greybull	0.000	0.000	US 14 east (Greybull Avenue) – Shell, Sheridan US 16 east / US 20 east / WYO 789 south (6th Street) – Basin, Worland	US 310 southern (eastern) terminus; eastern end of US 14 / US 16 / US 20 / WYO 789 concurrency; US 310 is unsigned
Wyoming	Big Horn		2.646	4.258	Airport Rest Area	
Wyoming	Big Horn		4.979	8.013	US 14 west / US 16 west / US 20 west – Cody, Yellowstone	Western end of US 14 / US 16 / US 20 concurrency; US 310 becomes signed
Wyoming	Big Horn	Lovell	32.006	51.509	US 14A east – Burgess Junction	Southern end of US 14A concurrency
Wyoming	Big Horn	Lovell	33.743	54.304	WYO 32 south – Emblem	
Wyoming	Big Horn		35.205	56.657	US 14A west – Byron, Powell, Cody	Northern end of US 14A concurrency
Wyoming	Big Horn	Cowley	39.133	62.978	WYO 35 south	
Wyoming	Big Horn	Deaver	45.113	72.602	WYO 114 south – Garland, Powell, Cody	
Wyoming	Park	No major junctions				
Wyoming–Montana state line			52.902 0.000	85.138 0.000	WYO 789 ends	WYO 789 northern terminus; western end of WYO 789 concurrency; directional signage changes from east-west to north-south
Montana	Carbon	Bridger	24.700	39.751	MT 72 south – Belfry, Cody	
Montana	Carbon	Rockvale	42.628	68.603	US 212 west – Red Lodge	Southern end of US 212 concurrency
Montana	Yellowstone	Laurel	54.154	87.152	I-90 / US 212 east – Billings, Butte	Northern end of US 212 concurrency; I-90 exit 434
Montana	Yellowstone	Laurel	54.646	87.944	I-90 BL (Main Street) / S-532 north (1st Avenue)	US 310 northern terminus; former US 10
1.000 mi = 1.609 km; 1.000 km = 0.621 mi: Concurrency terminus

== Notes ==
Browse numbered routes
← MT 287	MT	→ US 312
← WYO 296	WY	→ WYO 310
