= Northwest College =

Community college in Powell, Wyoming, United States

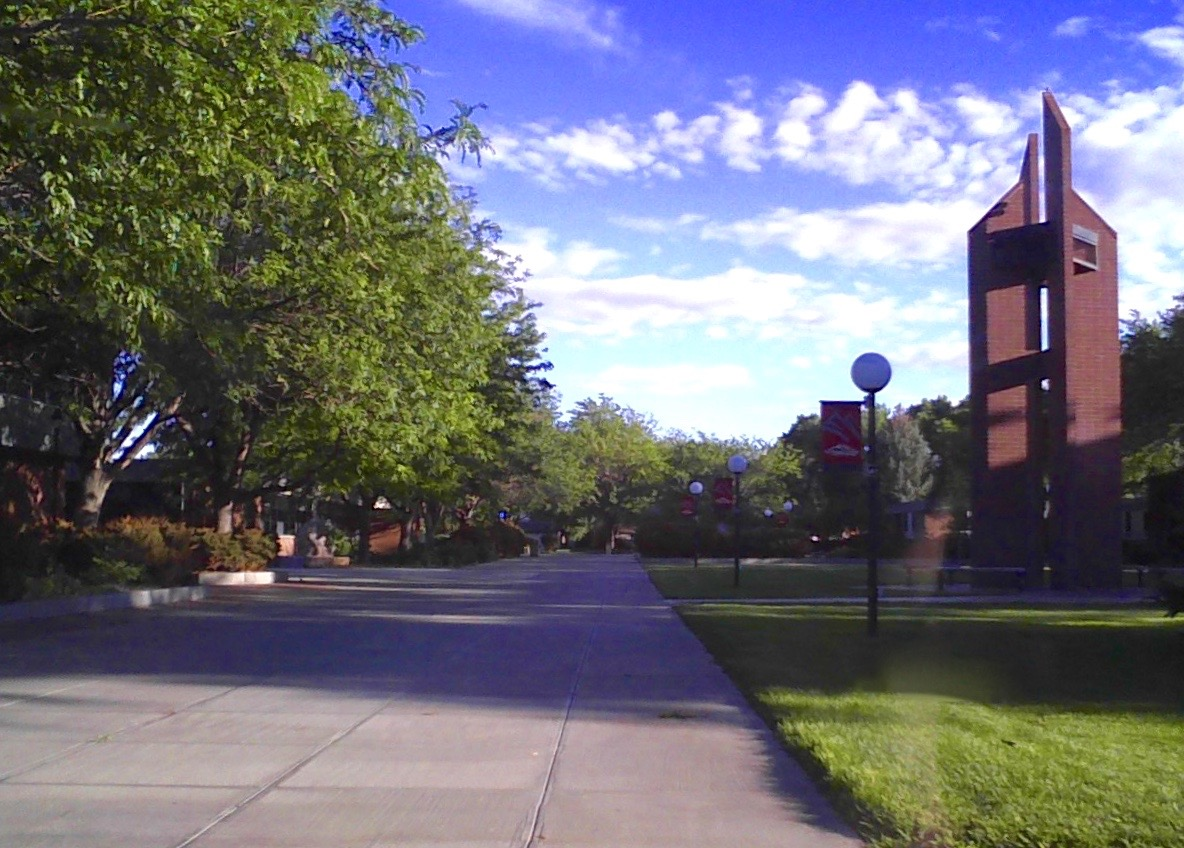
- Northwest College, July 2015
- Former names: Northwest Community College
- Motto: Your future, our focus
- Type: Public community college
- Established: 1946; 80 years ago
- Endowment: $53.2 million (2025)
- President: Lisa Watson
- Academic staff: 104 total, 61 full-time
- Administrative staff: 134
- Students: 1,443
- Location: Powell, Wyoming, United States; 44°45′37″N 108°45′45″W
- Campus: 132 acres (53 ha)
- Colors: Red and gray
- Mascot: Trapper
- Website: www.nwc.edu

Northwest College is a public community college off Wyoming Highway 295 in Powell, Wyoming, United States.

== History ==
Northwest College opened in 1946, as the "University of Wyoming Northwest Center," with the support of the University of Wyoming and the local school district. University support ended in 1950, and the current name was adopted in 1989.

== Academics ==
The college offers associate degrees, two bachelor's degree programs, and certificates.

== Notable people ==
- Chris Boucher, professional basketball player
- John Johnson, professional basketball player
- Monte Olsen, ski instructor and Wyoming legislator

== See also ==
- List of colleges and universities in Wyoming
