= Harpea's Cave =

Anticline cave on the Franco-Spanish border

Coordinates: 43.0331°N 1.1802°W

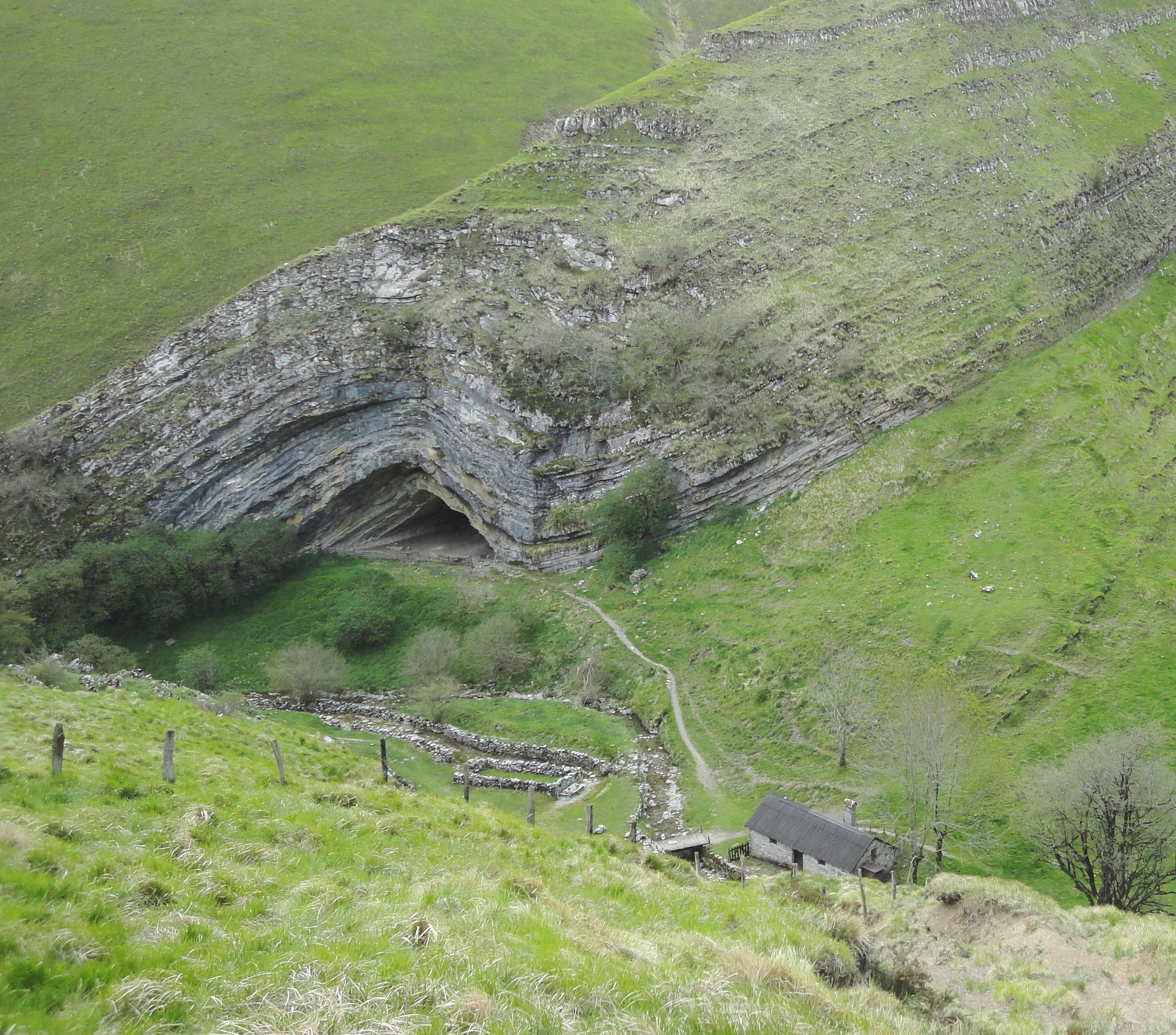
Harpea's Cave

Harpea's Cave (from the Basque "the place under the rock") is a cave located in Estérençuby, in the Navarre commune, a few meters from the Franco-Spanish border.

It is an example of an anticline, a convex fold of strata, the centre of which is occupied by the oldest geological layers.
