= Wyoming Highway 175 =

Highway in Wyoming

Wyoming Highway 175
- Kirby Road
- WYO 175 highlighted in red

Route information
- Maintained by WYDOT
- Length: 0.32 mi (510 m)

Major junctions
- West end: US 20 / WYO 789 near Kirby
- East end: West Main Street in Kirby

Location
- Country: United States
- State: Wyoming
- Counties: Hot Springs

Highway system
- Wyoming State Highway System; Interstate; US; State
| ← WYO 174 | → I-180 |

Wyoming Highway 175 (WYO 175) is a short 0.32-mile-long (0.51 km) spur route located in northeastern Hot Springs county that serves the small town of Kirby.

== Route description ==
Wyoming Highway 175 begins its western end at US Route 20/Wyoming Highway 789 just outside Kirby. Highway 175 travels due east for only 0.3 miles (0.48 km) before ending as it enters the town limits of Kirby. The roadway continues as West Main Street.

== Major intersections ==
The entire route is in Kirby, Hot Springs County.

| mi | km | Destinations | Notes |
|---|---|---|---|
| 0.00 | 0.00 | US 20 / WYO 789 | Western terminus of WYO 175 |
| 0.32 | 0.51 | West Main Street | Eastern terminus of WYO 175 |
1.000 mi = 1.609 km; 1.000 km = 0.621 mi
