= Wyoming Highway 170 =

State highway in Wyoming, United States

Wyoming Highway 170
- Owl Creek Road; Hamilton Dome Road
- WYO 170 highlighted in red

Route information
- Maintained by WYDOT
- Length: 15.41 mi (24.80 km)

Major junctions
- West end: CR 15 in Owl Creek
- East end: WYO 120

Location
- Country: United States
- State: Wyoming
- Counties: Hot Springs

Highway system
- Wyoming State Highway System; Interstate; US; State
← WYO 161	→ WYO 171

Wyoming Highway 170 (WYO 170) is a 15.41-mile-long (24.80 km) Wyoming state road located in central Hot Springs County. WYO 170 is predominantly an east–west highway, although it travels southeast to northwest for its last 5 miles.

== Route description ==
Wyoming Highway 170 begins its northwestern end in an area called Hamilton Dome within the census-designated place of Owl Creek at Hot Springs CR 15. Via CR 15 (Hamilton Dome Road) and CR 10 (Cottonwood Creek Road) one can return to Wyoming Highway 120.

Highway 170 travels southeasterly from Hamilton Dome, locally named Hamilton Dome Road, and meets the eastern terminus of Wyoming Highway 174 approximately 5.5 miles south of Hamilton Dome. Here WYO 170 turns east and is named Owl Creek Road. WYO 170 will continue east for the remainder of its routing as it parallels Owl Creek along north edge of Wind River Indian Reservation. Highway 170 reaches Wyoming Highway 120 at 15.41 miles and ends, eight miles northwest of Thermopolis.

== Major intersections ==
The entire route is in Hot Springs County.

Location	mi	km	Destinations	Notes
Owl Creek	0.00	0.00	CR 15	Western terminus of WYO 170
	5.67	9.12	WYO 174	Eastern terminus of WYO 174
	15.41	24.80	WYO 120	Eastern terminus of WYO 170
1.000 mi = 1.609 km; 1.000 km = 0.621 mi
