= Wyoming Highway 174 =

State highway in Wyoming, United States

Wyoming Highway 174
- WYO 174 highlighted in red

Route information
- Maintained by WYDOT
- Length: 0.60 mi (970 m)

Major junctions
- West end: CR 1
- East end: WYO 170

Location
- Country: United States
- State: Wyoming
- Counties: Hot Springs

Highway system
- Wyoming State Highway System; Interstate; US; State
← WYO 173	→ WYO 175

Wyoming Highway 174 (WYO 174) is a short 0.60-mile-long (0.97 km) Wyoming state road located in central Hot Springs county. WYO 174 acts as a spur off WYO 170 to some ranches west of the junction.

== Route description ==
Wyoming Highway 174 begins its western end at Hot Springs County Route 1 near Red Creek Ranch. Traveling east for just over a half-a-mile, WYO 174 reaches Wyoming Highway 170 and ends almost as soon as it began. Highway 174 lies approximately 5.5 miles south of Owl Creek.

== Major intersections ==
The entire route is in Hot Springs County.

Location	mi	km	Destinations	Notes
	0.00	0.00	CR 1	Western terminus of WYO 174
	0.60	0.97	WYO 170	Eastern terminus of WYO 174
1.000 mi = 1.609 km; 1.000 km = 0.621 mi
