= Wyoming Highway 290 =

State highway in Wyoming, United States

Wyoming Highway 290
- Pitchfork Road
- WYO 290 highlighted in red

Route information
- Maintained by WYDOT
- Length: 11.23 mi (18.07 km)

Major junctions
- West end: CR 4IX / CR 5XS
- East end: WYO 120 in Meeteetse

Location
- Country: United States
- State: Wyoming
- Counties: Park

Highway system
- Wyoming State Highway System; Interstate; US; State
← US 287	→ WYO 291

Wyoming Highway 290 (WYO 290) is an 11.23-mile-long (18.07 km) east-west Wyoming state road located in southern Park County, providing access to areas west of Meeteetse.

== Route description ==
Wyoming Highway 290 begins its western end at Park CR 4IX (Pitchfork Road) and Park CR 5XS, approximately 11 miles west of Meeteetse, near the Marathon Pitchfork oil fields. Highway 290 travels eastward along the south bank of the Greybull River which it will roughly parallel for its entire routing. WYO 290 passes north of the Lower Sunshine Reservoir and then crosses Wood River at just over 5 miles. As WYO 290 nears Meeteetse, it turns to travel more northeasterly and enters the town from the south. At 11.23 miles, it reaches its eastern terminus at Wyoming Highway 120 in Meeteetse.

== Major intersections ==
The entire route is in Park County.

Location	mi	km	Destinations	Notes
	0.00	0.00	CR 4IX (Pitchfork Road) / CR 5XS	Western terminus of WYO 290
Meeteetse	11.23	18.07	WYO 120	Eastern terminus of WYO 290
1.000 mi = 1.609 km; 1.000 km = 0.621 mi
