= Wyoming Highway 171 =

State highway in Wyoming, United States

Wyoming Highway 171
- Grass Creek Road
- WYO 171 highlighted in red

Route information
- Maintained by WYDOT
- Length: 8.63 mi (13.89 km)

Major junctions
- West end: CR 17 / CR 36 in Grass Creek
- East end: WYO 120

Location
- Country: United States
- State: Wyoming
- Counties: Hot Springs

Highway system
- Wyoming State Highway System; Interstate; US; State
← WYO 170	→ WYO 172

Wyoming Highway 171 (WYO 171) is a 8.63-mile-long (13.89 km) Wyoming state road located in northern Hot Springs County that serves the former town of Grass Creek and oil fields owned by Marathon Oil Company.

== Route description ==
Wyoming Highway 171 begins its west end in the former town of Grass Creek, located roughly halfway between Thermopolis and Meeteetse, at an intersection with Hot Springs County Route 36 (CR 36, Grass Creek Road) and CR 17 (4 Mile Road). 4 Mile Road returns to WYO 120, roughly 4 miles (6.4 km) north of Grass Creek. Founded in the 1860s, Grass Creek lies roughly 5,550 feet (1,690 m) above sea level. The actual population was unknown as of the 2000 census. Highway 171 travels southeasterly from Grass Creek, named Grass Creek Road, as it parallels the creek of the same name. At 8.63 miles, WYO 171 reaches its eastern terminus at WYO 120, 18 miles (29 km) northwest of Thermopolis.

== Major intersections ==
The entire route is in Hot Springs County.

Location	mi	km	Destinations	Notes
Grass Creek	0.00	0.00	CR 17 (4 Mile Road) / CR 36 (Grass Creek Road)	Western terminus of WYO 171
	8.63	13.89	WYO 120	Eastern terminus of WYO 171
1.000 mi = 1.609 km; 1.000 km = 0.621 mi
