= Wyoming Highway 37 =

State highway in Big Horn County, Wyoming, United States

Wyoming Highway 37
- Park Road
- WYO 37 highlighted in red

Route information
- Maintained by WYDOT
- Length: 9.00 mi (14.48 km)

Major junctions
- South end: US 14A east of Lovell
- North end: Bighorn Canyon National Recreation Area

Location
- Country: United States
- State: Wyoming
- Counties: Big Horn

Highway system
- Wyoming State Highway System; Interstate; US; State
← WYO 36	→ WYO 50

Wyoming Highway 37 (WYO 37), also known as Park Road, is a 9.00-mile (14.48 km) north–south state highway in northern Big Horn County, Wyoming, United States, that connect U.S. Route 14A (US 14A), east of Lovell, with the Bighorn Canyon National Recreation Area.

== Route description ==
WYO 37 begins at an intersection with US 14A, east of Lovell. (US 14A heads east toward Burgess Junction and Ranchester and west toward Lovell and Cody.) From its southern terminus, WYO 37 proceeds northerly along Park Road to cross the Shoshone River before an approximately 2.3-mile (3.7 km) jog to the east.

WYO 37 then resumes a northerly course for roughly five point zero more miles (8.0 km) before reaching its northern terminus at the entrance to the southern area of the Bighorn Canyon National Recreation Area, where state maintenance ends. (Park Road continues north through the National Recreation area to the Pryor Mountains Wild Horse Range and on into Montana to an area called Barry's Landing.

== Major intersections ==
The entire route is in Big Horn County.

Location	mi	km	Destinations	Notes
	0.00	0.00	Unnamed dirt road north	Continuation south from southern terminus
	0.00	0.00	US 14A east – Burgess Junction, Ranchester US 14A west – Lovell, Cody	Southern terminus
Bighorn Canyon National Recreation Area	9.00	14.48	Park Road north – Pryor Mountains Wild Horse Range	Northern terminus; Roadway continues north in the National Recreation Area
1.000 mi = 1.609 km; 1.000 km = 0.621 mi trans

== See also ==
- List of state highways in Wyoming
