= Montana Highway 72 =

State highway in Montana, United States

Montana Highway 72
- MT 72 highlighted in red

Route information
- Maintained by MDT
- Length: 21.408 mi (34.453 km)

Major junctions
- South end: WYO 120 at the Wyoming state line near Belfry
- North end: US 310 south of Bridger

Location
- Country: United States
- State: Montana
- Counties: Carbon

Highway system
- Montana Highway System; Interstate; US; State; Secondary
← MT 69	→ MT 77

Montana Highway 72 (MT 72) in the U.S. state of Montana is a route running northerly from the Wyoming state line to an intersection with U.S. Route 310 (US 310) about one mile (1.6 km) south of the town of Bridger, a distance of approximately 21 miles (34 km). At the state line, the road becomes Wyoming Highway 120, which continues 38 miles (61 km) to the town of Cody.

== History ==
Before receiving its current designation, the portion of Highway 72 north of Belfry was a part of Montana Secondary Highway 308 (S-308), and the segment between Belfry and the Wyoming state line was designated as S-397.

== Major intersections ==
The entire route is in Carbon County.

Location	mi	km	Destinations	Notes
	0.000	0.000	WYO 120 south	Continuation into Wyoming
Belfry	10.539	16.961	S-308	
Bridger	21.408	34.453	US 310	Northern terminus
1.000 mi = 1.609 km; 1.000 km = 0.621 mi
