= Park County School District No. 1 =

School district in Wyoming, United States

Park County School District No. 1, also known as the Powell School District, is a school district headquartered in Powell, Wyoming.

The district, entirely in Park County, includes Powell, Garland, and Ralston.

== History ==
In 2014, there was a proposal to put a portion of Yellowstone National Park, including Mammoth Hot Springs, Wyoming, into this school district. The students attended and still attend schools in Gardiner Public Schools, and under the proposal they still would have done so. Tessa Baker of the Powell Tribune wrote that "The Powell district would likely just serve as a conduit for state of Wyoming dollars to go to the Montana district." The issue appeared after the National Park Service halted payments to the Gardiner district and that district began having a deficit.

In May 2014 all members of the board of trustees of the school district agreed to the proposal. The previous month, the Park 1 school district sent a payment to the Gardiner school district, and in turn, at a later point, the Wyoming Department of Education paid the Park County district in turn. In June 2014 the Park County Boundary Board approved putting that area in the Park County School District 1.

== Schools ==
Secondary schools

- Powell High School (comprehensive high school)
- Shoshone Learning Center (alternative high school)
- Powell Middle School

Elementary schools

- Clark Elementary School
- Parkside Elementary School
- Southside Elementary School
- Westside Elementary School
