= Wyoming Highway 291 =

State highway in Park County, Wyoming, United States

Wyoming Highway 291
- Southfork Road
- WYO 291 highlighted in red

Route information
- Maintained by WYDOT
- Length: 9.46 mi (15.22 km)

Major junctions
- South end: CR 6WX southwest of Cody
- North end: US 14 / US 16 / US 20 in Cody

Location
- Country: United States
- State: Wyoming
- Counties: Park

Highway system
- Wyoming State Highway System; Interstate; US; State
← WYO 290	→ WYO 294

Wyoming Highway 291 (WYO 291), Southfork Road, is a 9.46-mile (15.22 km) north-south state highway in central Park County, Wyoming, United States. It connects the east end of Park County Road 6WX (CR 6WX) (south of the Buffalo Bill Reservoir) with U.S. Route 14 / U.S. Route 16 / U.S. Route 20 (US 14 / US 16 / US 20) in Cody and provides access to the south part of the Buffalo Bill State Park, Buffalo Bill Dam, and Buffalo Bill Reservoir.

== Route description ==
WYO 291 begins at the east end of County Road 6WX (Southfork Road) near the south end of the Buffalo Bill Reservoir, southwest of Cody. From its southern terminus, WYO 291 heads east along the southeastern side of the state park and reservoir before traveling more northeast toward Cody. WYO 291 then turns to head due north. At just under 9.5 miles (15.3 km), WYO 291 reaches its northern terminus at the Buffalo Bill Cody Scenic Byway, better known as US 14 / US 16 / US 20 (Yellowstone Avenue), on the west side of Cody.

== Major intersections ==
The entire route is in Park County.

Location	mi	km	Destinations	Notes
	0.00	0.00	CR 6WX (Southfork Road)	Southern terminus; WYO 291 becomes CR 6WX
Cody	9.46	15.22	US 14 east / US 16 east / US 20 east (W Yellowstone Ave) – Greybull, Basin US 14 west / US 16 west / US 20 west (W Yellowstone Ave) – Wapiti, Yellowstone National Park, Lake Junction (Lake)	Northern terminus; T intersection
1.000 mi = 1.609 km; 1.000 km = 0.621 mi: Route transition

== See also ==
- List of state highways in Wyoming
