= Elk Basin =

Oil field in Wyoming, United States

Coordinates: 44°59′50″N 108°52′10″W

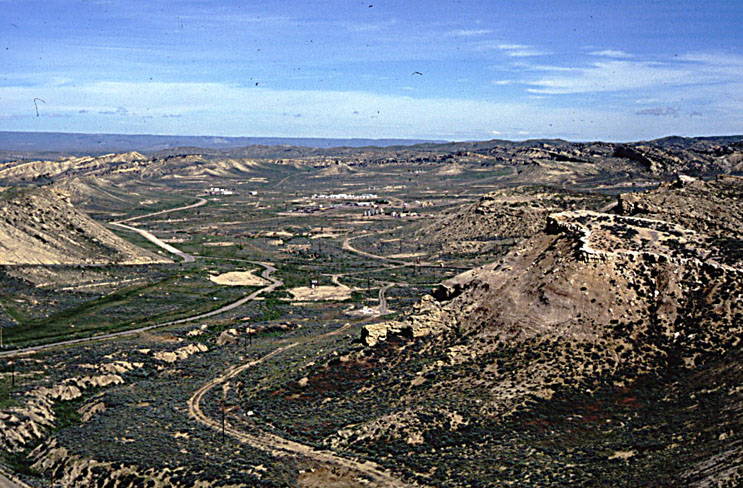
View of Elk Basin facing north along the axis of the anticline. Note strata dipping to the right and left on the sides of the image.

Elk Basin is a valley on the border of Montana and Wyoming in the United States. It is an active oil field with hundreds of derricks operating in it. Geologically, it is a breached anticline formed by a deep subsurface thrust fault. Most of the rocks at the surface are Cretaceous in age, including the Lance Formation, Meeteetse Formation, Mesaverde Formation, Cody Shale, and Frontier Formation.

== Teaching Geology ==
As the rock strata in the basin are mostly exposed and relatively easy to identify, Elk Basin has long been used as a place for geology students to learn to practice geological mapping. Often mapping classes are supported by the Yellowstone Bighorn Research Association, located in Red Lodge, Montana.
