= Ralston, Wyoming =

Census-designated place in Park County, Wyoming, United States

- Census-designated place
- Location in Wyoming Location in the United States
- Coordinates: 44°42′37″N 108°52′32″W
- Country: United States
- State: Wyoming
- County: Park

Area
  - Total: 5.6 sq mi (14.6 km^{2})
  - Land: 5.6 sq mi (14.6 km^{2})
  - Water: 0 sq mi (0.0 km^{2})
- Elevation: 4,561 ft (1,390 m)

Population (2010)
  - Total: 280
  - Density: 50/sq mi (19/km^{2})
- Time zone: UTC-7 (Mountain (MST))
  - Summer (DST): UTC-6 (MDT)
- ZIP code: 82440
- Area code: 307
- FIPS code: 56-63465
- GNIS feature ID: 2409126

Ralston is a census-designated place (CDP) in Park County, Wyoming, United States. The population was 280 at the 2010 census.

== History ==
Ralston was established due to the Chicago, Burlington and Quincy Railroad. It was platted in 1906 with lots for sale in 1907. The post office was established March 16, 1907.

The town was either named for a railroad worker or the bar owner in town.

== Geography ==
According to the United States Census Bureau, the CDP has a total area of 5.6 square miles (14.6 km^{2}), all land.

== Demographics ==
As of the census of 2000, there were 233 people, 96 households, and 74 families residing in the CDP. The population density was 41.3 people per square mile (16.0/km^{2}). There were 101 housing units at an average density of 17.9/sq mi (6.9/km^{2}). The racial makeup of the CDP was 95.71% White, 1.29% Native American, 2.58% from other races, and 0.43% from two or more races. Hispanic or Latino of any race were 6.44% of the population.

There were 96 households, out of which 20.8% had children under the age of 18 living with them, 68.8% were married couples living together, 7.3% had a female householder with no husband present, and 22.9% were non-families. 17.7% of all households were made up of individuals, and 8.3% had someone living alone who was 65 years of age or older. The average household size was 2.43 and the average family size was 2.70.

In the CDP, the population was spread out, with 19.3% under the age of 18, 5.2% from 18 to 24, 24.0% from 25 to 44, 31.8% from 45 to 64, and 19.7% who were 65 years of age or older. The median age was 46 years. For every 100 females, there were 95.8 males. For every 100 females age 18 and over, there were 97.9 males.

The median income for a household in the CDP was $40,893, and the median income for a family was $41,429. Males had a median income of $29,091 versus $28,333 for females. The per capita income for the CDP was $22,320. None of the population or families were below the poverty line.

== Education ==
It is in Park County School District 1.

== See also ==
- List of census-designated places in Wyoming
