= Garland, Wyoming =

Census-designated place in Park County, Wyoming, United States

- Census-designated place
- Location in Wyoming Location in the United States
- Coordinates: 44°46′23″N 108°38′20″W
- Country: United States
- State: Wyoming
- County: Park
- Founded: 1901

Area
  - Total: 3.4 sq mi (8.8 km^{2})
  - Land: 3.4 sq mi (8.8 km^{2})
  - Water: 0.0 sq mi (0 km^{2})
- Elevation: 4,246 ft (1,294 m)

Population (2010)
  - Total: 115
  - Density: 34/sq mi (13/km^{2})
- Time zone: UTC-7 (Mountain (MST))
  - Summer (DST): UTC-6 (MDT)
- ZIP code: 82435
- Area code: 307
- FIPS code: 56-30985
- GNIS feature ID: 2408283

Garland is a census-designated place (CDP) in Park County, Wyoming, United States. The population was 115 at the 2010 census.

== History ==
Garland was founded in 1901. It was named for J.W. Garland, a forest ranger. It was nicknamed "Gate City" due to being Chicago, Burlington and Quincy Railroad's gateway to the Bighorn Basin. The town prospered until the main line of the railroad bypassed Garland five years later.

== Geography ==
According to the United States Census Bureau, the CDP has a total area of 3.4 square miles (8.8 km^{2}), all land.

== Demographics ==
As of the census of 2000, there were 95 people, 43 households, and 28 families residing in the CDP. The population density was 30.8 people per square mile (11.9/km^{2}). There were 47 housing units at an average density of 15.3/sq mi (5.9/km^{2}). The racial makeup of the CDP was 98.95% White, 1.05% from other races. Hispanic or Latino of any race were 1.05% of the population.

There were 43 households, out of which 18.6% had children under the age of 18 living with them, 58.1% were married couples living together, 4.7% had a female householder with no husband present, and 32.6% were non-families. 25.6% of all households were made up of individuals, and 16.3% had someone living alone who was 65 years of age or older. The average household size was 2.21 and the average family size was 2.69.

In the CDP, the population was spread out, with 18.9% under the age of 18, 7.4% from 18 to 24, 15.8% from 25 to 44, 33.7% from 45 to 64, and 24.2% who were 65 years of age or older. The median age was 48 years. For every 100 females, there were 90.0 males. For every 100 females age 18 and over, there were 108.1 males.

The median income for a household in the CDP was $26,250, and the median income for a family was $75,246. Males had a median income of $0 versus $0 for females. The per capita income for the CDP was $24,333. There were no families and 28.8% of the population living below the poverty line, including no under eighteens and 23.8% of those over 64.

== Education ==
It is in Park County School District 1.
