= Emblem, Wyoming =

- Unincorporated community
- Location within the state of Wyoming Emblem, Wyoming (the United States)
- Coordinates: 44°30′21″N 108°23′30″W
- Country: United States
- State: Wyoming
- County: Big Horn
- Elevation: 4,449 ft (1,356 m)
- Time zone: UTC-7 (Mountain (MST))
  - Summer (DST): UTC-6 (MDT)
- ZIP codes: 82422
- GNIS feature ID: 1609087

Emblem (also Germania or Liberty Bench) is an unincorporated community in western Big Horn County, Wyoming, United States. The community has an official population of 10, although the surrounding rural area increases the number to over 100. It lies along the concurrent U.S. Routes 14, 16 and 20, west-northwest of the town of Basin, the county seat of Big Horn County. Its elevation is 4,449 ft (1,356 m). Although Emblem is unincorporated, it has a post office, with the ZIP code of 82422.

== History ==
Emblem was founded in 1896 when Solon Wiley's Big Horn Basin Development Company brought irrigation to the Emblem Bench. Lutheran Germans settled there. The area now known as Emblem was once called Germania Bench after a settlement of German Lutherans arrived to farm the land. The name became a subject of Anti-German sentiment during the first World War and the surrounding communities demanded that it be changed. Specifically, the community was told that the new name should be an "emblem of liberty." Accordingly, the name was changed to Emblem and the area was often referred to as "Liberty Bench."

== Climate ==
According to the Köppen climate classification system, Emblem has a cold desert climate, abbreviated "BWk" on climate maps. The hottest temperature recorded in Emblem was 109 °F (43 °C) on June 30, 2007, while the coldest temperature recorded was −37 °F (−38 °C) on December 31, 1978.

Climate data for Emblem, Wyoming, 1991–2020 normals, extremes 1911–present
Month	Jan	Feb	Mar	Apr	May	Jun	Jul	Aug	Sep	Oct	Nov	Dec	Year
Record high °F (°C)	62 (17)	69 (21)	79 (26)	89 (32)	97 (36)	109 (43)	105 (41)	103 (39)	97 (36)	88 (31)	72 (22)	68 (20)	109 (43)
Mean maximum °F (°C)	48.9 (9.4)	53.8 (12.1)	68.9 (20.5)	78.3 (25.7)	85.9 (29.9)	93.6 (34.2)	97.2 (36.2)	95.7 (35.4)	90.4 (32.4)	78.7 (25.9)	62.8 (17.1)	51.9 (11.1)	98.4 (36.9)
Mean daily maximum °F (°C)	30.8 (−0.7)	35.4 (1.9)	49.5 (9.7)	58.5 (14.7)	67.7 (19.8)	77.6 (25.3)	85.9 (29.9)	84.0 (28.9)	73.7 (23.2)	58.3 (14.6)	43.1 (6.2)	31.8 (−0.1)	58.0 (14.4)
Daily mean °F (°C)	19.6 (−6.9)	24.1 (−4.4)	36.4 (2.4)	45.0 (7.2)	54.5 (12.5)	63.5 (17.5)	70.6 (21.4)	68.3 (20.2)	58.8 (14.9)	45.3 (7.4)	31.4 (−0.3)	20.9 (−6.2)	44.9 (7.1)
Mean daily minimum °F (°C)	8.5 (−13.1)	12.7 (−10.7)	23.3 (−4.8)	31.5 (−0.3)	41.2 (5.1)	49.4 (9.7)	55.2 (12.9)	52.7 (11.5)	44.0 (6.7)	32.3 (0.2)	19.7 (−6.8)	9.9 (−12.3)	31.7 (−0.2)
Mean minimum °F (°C)	−13.2 (−25.1)	−7.4 (−21.9)	5.4 (−14.8)	18.1 (−7.7)	27.6 (−2.4)	38.2 (3.4)	46.1 (7.8)	42.1 (5.6)	31.1 (−0.5)	15.9 (−8.9)	−1.0 (−18.3)	−8.5 (−22.5)	−19.1 (−28.4)
Record low °F (°C)	−35 (−37)	−34 (−37)	−19 (−28)	5 (−15)	18 (−8)	31 (−1)	34 (1)	30 (−1)	16 (−9)	−10 (−23)	−28 (−33)	−37 (−38)	−37 (−38)
Average precipitation inches (mm)	0.24 (6.1)	0.26 (6.6)	0.36 (9.1)	0.83 (21)	1.41 (36)	1.31 (33)	0.63 (16)	0.42 (11)	1.00 (25)	0.76 (19)	0.29 (7.4)	0.22 (5.6)	7.73 (195.8)
Average snowfall inches (cm)	2.8 (7.1)	3.1 (7.9)	1.2 (3.0)	2.0 (5.1)	0.2 (0.51)	0.0 (0.0)	0.0 (0.0)	0.0 (0.0)	0.0 (0.0)	1.2 (3.0)	2.5 (6.4)	3.3 (8.4)	16.3 (41.41)
Average precipitation days (≥ 0.01 in)	2.8	2.7	3.3	5.4	7.3	7.5	4.6	4.7	4.4	3.9	3.2	2.9	52.7
Average snowy days (≥ 0.1 in)	1.5	1.3	0.6	1.1	0.5	0.0	0.0	0.0	0.0	0.5	1.5	1.3	8.3
Source 1: NOAA
Source 2: National Weather Service

== Education ==
Public education in the community of Emblem is provided by Big Horn County School District #3. The district has three campuses – Greybull Elementary School (grades K-5), Greybull Middle School (6-8), and Greybull High School (9-12).
