= National Register of Historic Places listings in Hot Springs County, Wyoming =

Location of Hot Springs County in Wyoming

This is a list of the National Register of Historic Places listings in Hot Springs County, Wyoming. It is intended to be a complete list of the properties and districts on the National Register of Historic Places in Hot Springs County, Wyoming, United States. The locations of National Register properties and districts for which the latitude and longitude coordinates are included below, may be seen in a map.

There are 11 properties and districts listed on the National Register in the county.

This National Park Service list is complete through NPS recent listings posted August 8, 2025.

Contents: Counties in Wyoming
Albany - Big Horn - Campbell - Carbon - Converse - Crook - Fremont - Goshen - Hot Springs - Johnson - Laramie - Lincoln - Natrona - Niobrara - Park - Platte - Sheridan - Sublette - Sweetwater - Teton - Uinta - Washakie - Weston

== Current listings ==
	Name on the Register	Image	Date listed	Location	City or town	Description
1	Bates Battlefield		November 20, 1974 (#74002286)	Bates Creek; 43°32′31″N 107°36′17″W	East Thermopolis vicinity	
2	Callaghan Apartments	Callaghan Apartments	March 29, 1993 (#93000231)	116 East Park Street; 43°39′02″N 108°11′54″W	Thermopolis	
3	CQA Four Mile Bridge	CQA Four Mile Bridge	February 22, 1985 (#85000423)	Wyoming Highway 173; 43°36′13″N 108°11′48″W	Thermopolis vicinity	Replaced in 1993
4	Downtown Thermopolis Historic District	Downtown Thermopolis Historic District	May 10, 1984 (#84003668)	Broadway, 5th, and 6th Streets; also 531-541 Broadway, 109 South 6th St. 43°38′46″N 108°12′37″W	Thermopolis	Second set of addresses represent a boundary increase approved September 26, 2022
5	EFP Bridge over Owl Creek	EFP Bridge over Owl Creek	February 22, 1985 (#85000424)	County Road CN15-28; 43°41′28″N 108°23′34″W	Thermopolis vicinity	Replaced
6	Alex Halone House	Alex Halone House	January 14, 1994 (#93001473)	204 Amoretti Street; 43°38′30″N 108°12′12″W	Thermopolis	
7	Kirby Jail and Town Hall	Kirby Jail and Town Hall	December 6, 2011 (#11000875)	120 East 4th Street; 43°48′18″N 108°10′49″W	Kirby	
8	Legend Rock Petroglyph Site	Legend Rock Petroglyph Site	July 5, 1973 (#73001932)	Address restricted 43°47′54″N 108°35′58″W	Grass Creek	
9	Malta Lodge No. 17 AF&AM	Malta Lodge No. 17 AF&AM	November 22, 2021 (#100007161)	521 Arapahoe St. 43°38′50″N 108°12′40″W	Thermopolis	
10	US Post Office-Thermopolis Main	US Post Office-Thermopolis Main	May 19, 1987 (#87000784)	440 Arapahoe Street; 43°38′51″N 108°12′33″W	Thermopolis	
11	Woodruff Cabin Site		February 26, 1970 (#70000671)	26 mi (42 km) northwest of Thermopolis; 43°42′52″N 108°40′18″W	Thermopolis vicinity	

== See also ==
- List of National Historic Landmarks in Wyoming
- National Register of Historic Places listings in Wyoming
