= Wyoming's 28th House of Representatives district =

American legislative district

Wyoming's 28th State House of Representatives district
- Wyoming's 28th House of Representatives district as of 2022
Representative
John Winter; R–Thermopolis
- Demographics: 89% White; 5% Hispanic; 1% Native American; 4% Multiracial
- Population (2022): 8,798

Wyoming's 28th House of Representatives district is one of 62 districts in the Wyoming House of Representatives. The district encompasses Hot Springs County as well as parts of Big Horn, Fremont, and Park counties. It is represented by Republican Representative John Winter of Thermopolis.

In 1992, the state of Wyoming switched from electing state legislators by county to a district-based system.

== List of members representing the district ==
Representative	Party	Term	Note
Mike Baker	Republican	1993 – 2005	Elected in 1992. Re-elected in 1994. Re-elected in 1996. Re-elected in 1998. Re-elected in 2000. Re-elected in 2002.
Lorraine Quarberg	Republican	2005 – 2013	Elected in 2004. Re-elected in 2006. Re-elected in 2008. Re-elected in 2010.
Nathan Winters	Republican	2013 – 2019	Elected in 2012. Re-elected in 2014. Re-elected in 2016.
John Winter	Republican	2019 – present	Elected in 2018. Re-elected in 2020. Re-elected in 2022. Re-elected in 2024.
Allen Hogg	Republican	2027 – member-elect	Elected in 2026.

== Recent election results ==
=== 2014 ===
House district 28 general election
Party	Candidate	Votes	%
Republican	Nathan Winters (Incumbent)	2,989	97.32%
Write-ins		82	2.67%
Total votes		3,071	100.0%
Invalid or blank votes		572	
Republican hold			

=== 2016 ===
House district 28 general election
Party	Candidate	Votes	%
Republican	Nathan Winters (Incumbent)	3,510	78.01%
Democratic	Howard Samelson	980	21.78%
Write-ins		9	0.20%
Total votes		4,499	100.0%
Invalid or blank votes		171	
Republican hold			

=== 2018 ===
House district 28 general election
Party	Candidate	Votes	%
Republican	John Winter	2,906	75.09%
Democratic	Howie Samelson	954	24.65%
Write-ins		10	0.25%
Total votes		3,870	100.0%
Invalid or blank votes		133	
Republican hold			

=== 2020 ===
House district 28 general election
Party	Candidate	Votes	%
Republican	John Winter (Incumbent)	3,769	81.59%
Democratic	Levi J. Shinkle	816	17.66%
Write-ins		34	0.73%
Total votes		4,619	100.0%
Invalid or blank votes		145	
Republican hold			

=== 2022 ===
House district 28 general election
Party	Candidate	Votes	%
Republican	John Winter (Incumbent)	3,139	78.33%
Democratic	Kimberly M. Bartlett	855	21.33%
Write-ins		13	0.32%
Total votes		4,007	100.0%
Invalid or blank votes		101	
Republican hold			

=== 2024 ===
House district 28 general election
Party	Candidate	Votes	%
Republican	John Winter (Incumbent)	3,986	82.10%
Democratic	Larry Alwin	857	17.65%
Write-ins		12	0.24%
Total votes		4,855	100.0%
Invalid or blank votes		186	
Republican hold			

== Historical district boundaries ==
Map	Description	Apportionment Plan	Notes
	Hot Springs County; Big Horn County (part); Washakie County (part)	1992 Apportionment Plan	
	Hot Springs County; Big Horn County (part); Park County (part)	2002 Apportionment Plan	
	Hot Springs County; Big Horn County (part); Fremont County (part); Park County (part)	2012 Apportionment Plan	
