= Wyoming Highway 172 =

State highway in Wyoming, United States

Wyoming Highway 172
- Black Mountain Road
- WYO 172 highlighted in red

Route information
- Maintained by WYDOT
- Length: 11.26 mi (18.12 km)

Major junctions
- West end: US 20 / WYO 789 in Lucerne
- East end: CR 6

Location
- Country: United States
- State: Wyoming
- Counties: Hot Springs

Highway system
- Wyoming State Highway System; Interstate; US; State
← WYO 171	→ WYO 173

Wyoming Highway 172 (WYO 172) is a 11.26-mile-long (18.12 km) Wyoming state road located in Hot Springs County northeast of Thermopolis and serves the various oil fields in the eastern part of the county.

== Route description ==
Wyoming Highway 172 begins its west end at US 20/WYO 789 in the community of Lucerne, roughly 6 miles north of Thermopolis. Highway 172, named Black Mountain Road, travels east and crosses the Bighorn River at just under 8 tenths of a mile. Past the Bighorn, WYO 173 crosses Kirby Creek and will run along the north side, paralleling, for the remainder of its routing. At 11.26 miles, Highway 172 reaches its eastern terminus at Hot Springs County Route 6 (Black Mountain Road) near the Zimmerman Oil and Butte Gas Fields. CR 6 continues further eastward, just south of the Washakie County line, to the Kirby Creek, Murphy Dome, and other outlying oil Fields in eastern Hot Springs County.

== Major intersections ==
The entire route is in Hot Springs County.

Location	mi	km	Destinations	Notes
Lucerne	0.00	0.00	US 20 / WYO 789	Western terminus of WYO 172
	11.26	18.12	CR 6 (Black Mountain Road)	Eastern terminus of WYO 172
1.000 mi = 1.609 km; 1.000 km = 0.621 mi
