= Alex Halone House =

Historic house in Wyoming, United States

- U.S. National Register of Historic Places
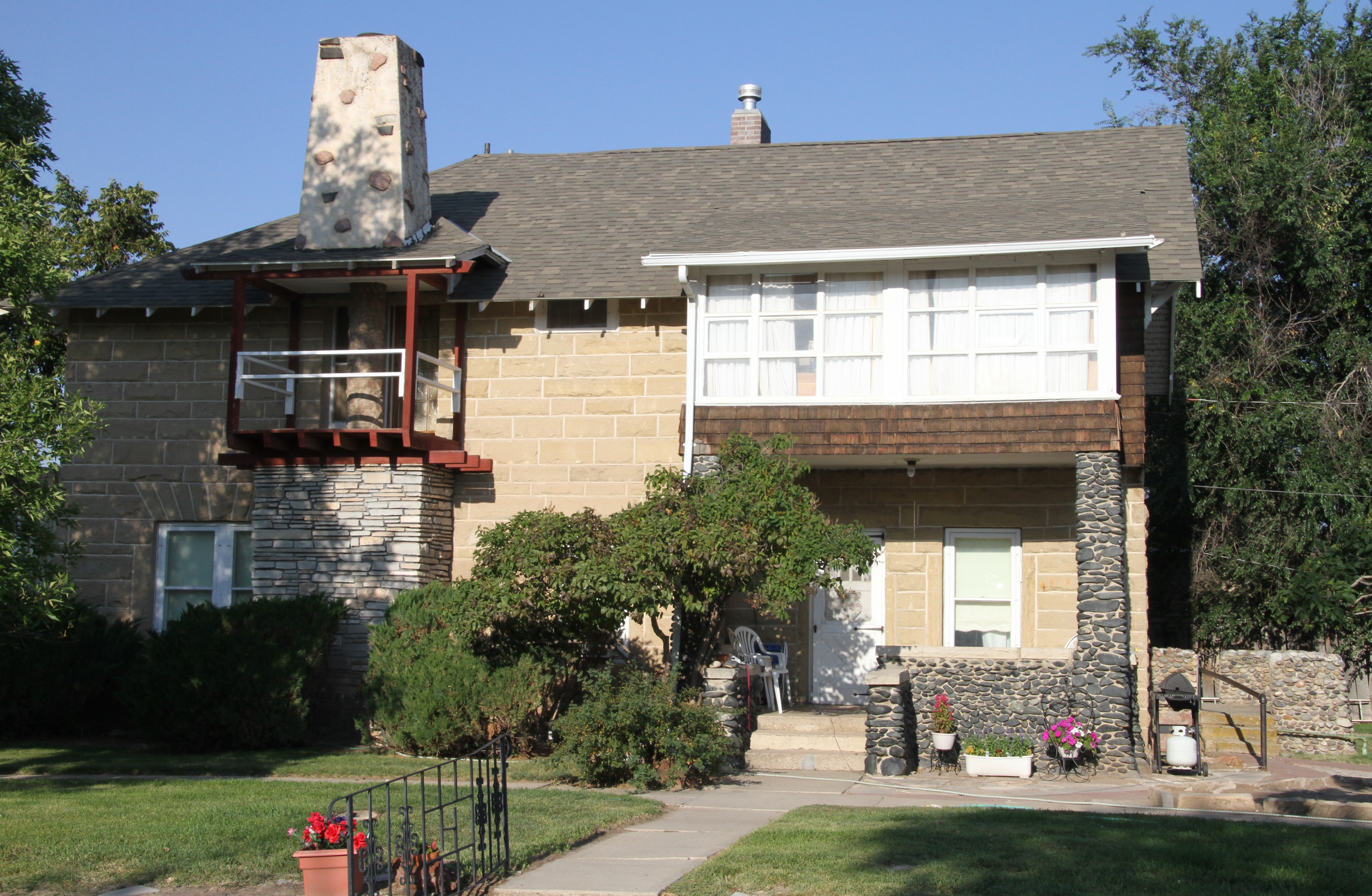
- Front of the house seen from the east

- Location within Wyoming Location within the United States
- Location: 204 Amoretti Street; Thermopolis, Wyoming
- Coordinates: 43°38′30″N 108°12′19″W
- Area: 3 acres (1.2 ha)
- Built: 1919
- Architect: Alex Halone
- Architectural style: Folk Builder-designed stone
- NRHP reference No.: 93001473
- Added to NRHP: 14 January 1994

The Alex Halone House in Thermopolis, Wyoming, United States, was built by Finnish immigrant Alex Halone for his personal residence in 1909–1910. Halone, a stonemason, built several stone structures in Thermopolis. Three generations of the Halone family were stonemasons. The grounds include a log Finnish sauna built by Alex and Eugene Halone with assistance from Lauri Suikaonen in 1946–51.

== History ==
Halone started the house in 1909, digging a 12-by-12-foot (3.7 m × 3.7 m) basement with sandstone walls and a temporary roof, in which he and his family lived that winter. The next year he built the two–story house, 27.5-foot (8.4 m) by 27.5-foot (8.4 m) in rock-faced ashlar sandstone. Details were executed in travertine, locally found in the terraces of thermal springs. Over time a series of porches and dependent structures were built, sometimes as advertisements of Halone's skill with stonework. A chimney on the east side of the house uses slate, pink granite and sandstone, and incorporates a balcony and a window.

A variety of porches were added by Halone, while the rear was raised from one to two stories. During the 1920s Halone altered the house to accommodate renters. Other contributing structures include a garage from the 1920s, a barn, and the sauna, which is noted on the National Register nomination as "exceptionally significant." Non-contributing structures include a picnic shelter, a well, a fish pond and bridge and an outdoor grill. While considered non-contributing to the historic designation, these elements are sympathetic in design and material to the historic structures.

== Alex Halone ==
Alex Halone was born on 18 June 1877 in Finland, the son of granite cutter Anti Halonen and his wife Anna Liisa Karkkainen. He learned his trade from his father and emigrated to the United States in 1904, leaving behind a wife and child. Some time after he arrived at Ellis Island in 1904 he changed his name to "Halone." He first worked at a stone quarry in Quincy, Massachusetts, then moved to Valparaiso, Indiana, where he enrolled in night classes at Valparaiso University and learned English. He moved to Thermopolis, which impressed him with its hot springs and natural setting. Halone filed a homestead claim for 160 acres (65 ha) of land outside Thermopolis and planted it in crops. He excavated a dugout for his family, for whom he sent instructions to join him in Wyoming. The homestead expanded to 640 acres (260 ha), encompassing a quarry from which Halone obtained building stone. At the same time he purchased property in Thermopolis for his house in town.

Halone built the house in 1909–1910. He became politically active in the local miners' union while working as a miner from time to time at Gebo, Wyoming. He eventually became president of the union. During World War II he worked as a stonemason on Army installations in Alaska. Halone's work in Thermopolis included the Emery Hotel and Skinner Building (both now demolished) and the stonework on the Hot Springs County Courthouse. He built perhaps seven houses in Gebo, two of which are still standing, and the Mondell Park Fountain in Hot Springs State Park. In 1923 Halone built the base for the statue of Buffalo Bill in Cody, Wyoming. Alex and his son Eugene worked together from 1928 to 1935, doing stonemasonry at Yellowstone, Grand Canyon and Sequoia National Parks. They built the fireplaces at the Old Faithful (upper store) and Fishing Bridge Hamilton's Stores in Yellowstone.

Alex Halone, still in good health at 82, was struck by a car and died in 1959.

== Description ==
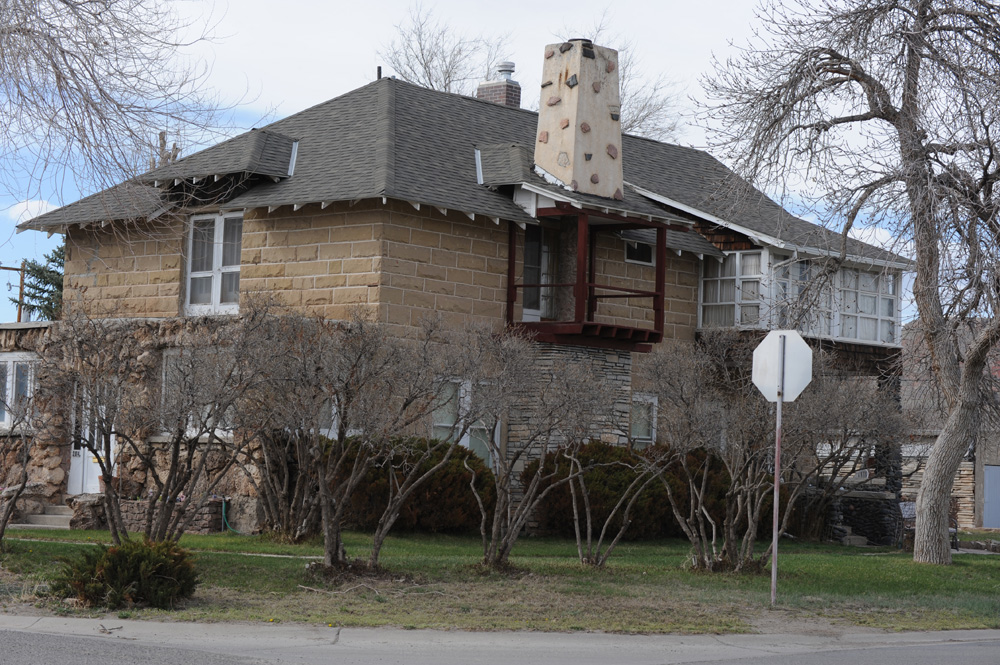
The house from the southeast

The Halone House reflects Alex Halone's artistry in stonework, with a variety of fanciful masonry treatments. At its core, the house is an approximately square two–story house, built in square sandstone, with a hipped roof. To the front, a porch has been added in very rough travertine stone with a rubble jack arch over the front door. A garage flanks the porch to the left. On the east side of the house is a stacked and squared chimney extending the height of the first floor, supporting an enclosed balcony. The flue extends between two windows from the main house looking on top the balcony. From the top of the balcony rises a tapering stucco flue studded with rubble. The rear of the house is capped by a second-story addition, clad in shingles. The west side is rough in appearance and was apparently considered a secondary elevation.

=== Sauna ===
The log sauna was built late in Alex Halone's life over several years with the help of his son Eugene and a fellow Finnish immigrant, Lauri Suikaonen. The 1½ story building houses the sauna room under the flat-roofed section and a dressing room under an upstairs room. The sauna represents a significant aspect of Finnish immigrant life, and is one of only two examples of its kind in Wyoming.

The Halone House was listed on the National Register of Historic Places in 1994.
