= Wyoming Highway 173 =

State highway in Hot Springs County, Wyoming, United States

Wyoming Highway 173
- WYO 173 highlighted in red

Route information
- Maintained by WYDOT
- Length: 1.61 mi (2.59 km)

Major junctions
- West end: US 20 / WYO 789 south of Thermopolis
- East end: CR 31 south of Thermopolis

Location
- Country: United States
- State: Wyoming
- Counties: Hot Springs

Highway system
- Wyoming State Highway System; Interstate; US; State
← WYO 172	→ WYO 174

Wyoming Highway 173 (WYO 173) is a short 1.61-mile (2.59 km) state highway in Hot Springs County, Wyoming, United States, south of Thermopolis. It connects U.S. Route 20 / Wyoming Highway 789 (US 20 / WYO 789) with County Route 31 (CR 31).

== Route description ==
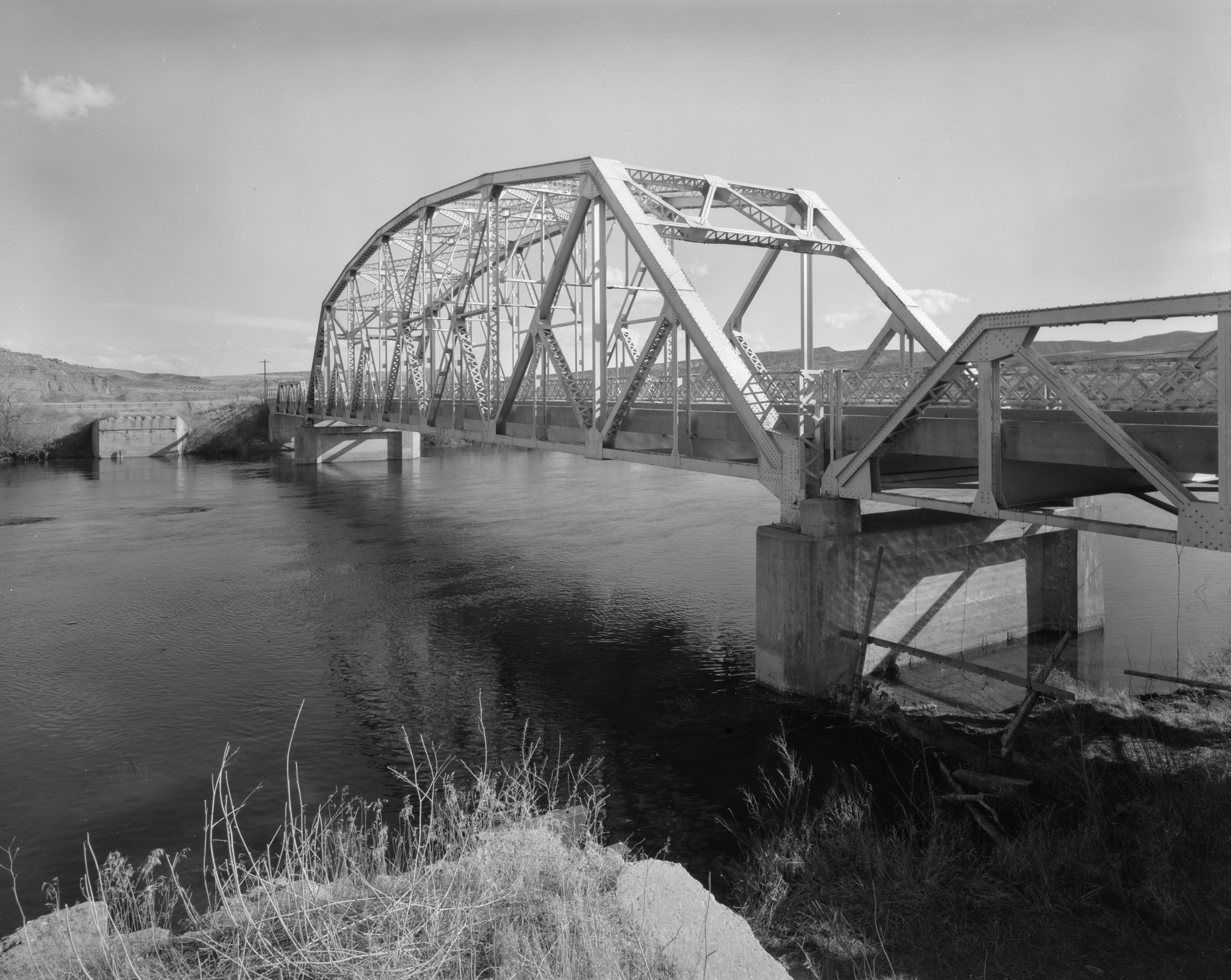
WYO 173 crossing the Bighorn River on the CQA Four Mile Bridge, February 1982

WYO 173 begins at an intersection with US 20 / WYO 789, just over one and a half miles (2.4 km) south of Thermopolis. From its western terminus, SYO 173 heads southeast on Buffalo Creek Road along the south bank of the Bighorn River. At 1.42 miles (2.29 km), WYO 173 crosses the river via the CQA Four Mile Bridge which is listed on the National Register of Historic Places. Two-tenths of a mile (0.32 km) later, after Buffalo turns east and WYO 173 becomes South Yellowstone Road, the highway reaches its eastern terminus at the north end of CR 31. CR 31 continues southwest along South Yellowstone Road for another 1.6 miles (2.6 km) before ending at US 20 / WYO 789.

== History ==
The original Four Mile Bridge, which carried WYO 173 over the Big Horn River, was completed in 1928 and was added to the National Register of Historic Places as part of a forty-bridge collection that illustrates steel truss construction. It was offered for sale by the Wyoming Highway Department in 1987 ahead of a planned replacement. The project to improve WYO 173 and replace the bridge was part of a 1984 agreement to eventually transfer control to Hot Springs County, but the county government declined to assume responsibility in 1993.

== Major intersections ==
The entire route is in Hot Springs County.

Location	mi	km	Destinations	Notes
	0.00	0.00	Lane 14 south	Continuation east, then immediately south from western terminus
	0.00	0.00	US 20 east / WYO 789 south – Shoshoni, Casper US 20 west / WYO 789 north – Thermopolis, Worland	Western terminus
	1.42	2.29	Bridge over the Bighorn River	
	1.61	2.59	CR 31 south (S Yellowstone Rd) – US 20 / WYO 789	Eastern terminus; WYO 173 becomes CR 31
1.000 mi = 1.609 km; 1.000 km = 0.621 mi: Route transition

== See also ==
- List of state highways in Wyoming
