= Buffalo Bill – The Scout =

Sculpture by Gertrude Vanderbilt Whitney

- U.S. National Register of Historic Places
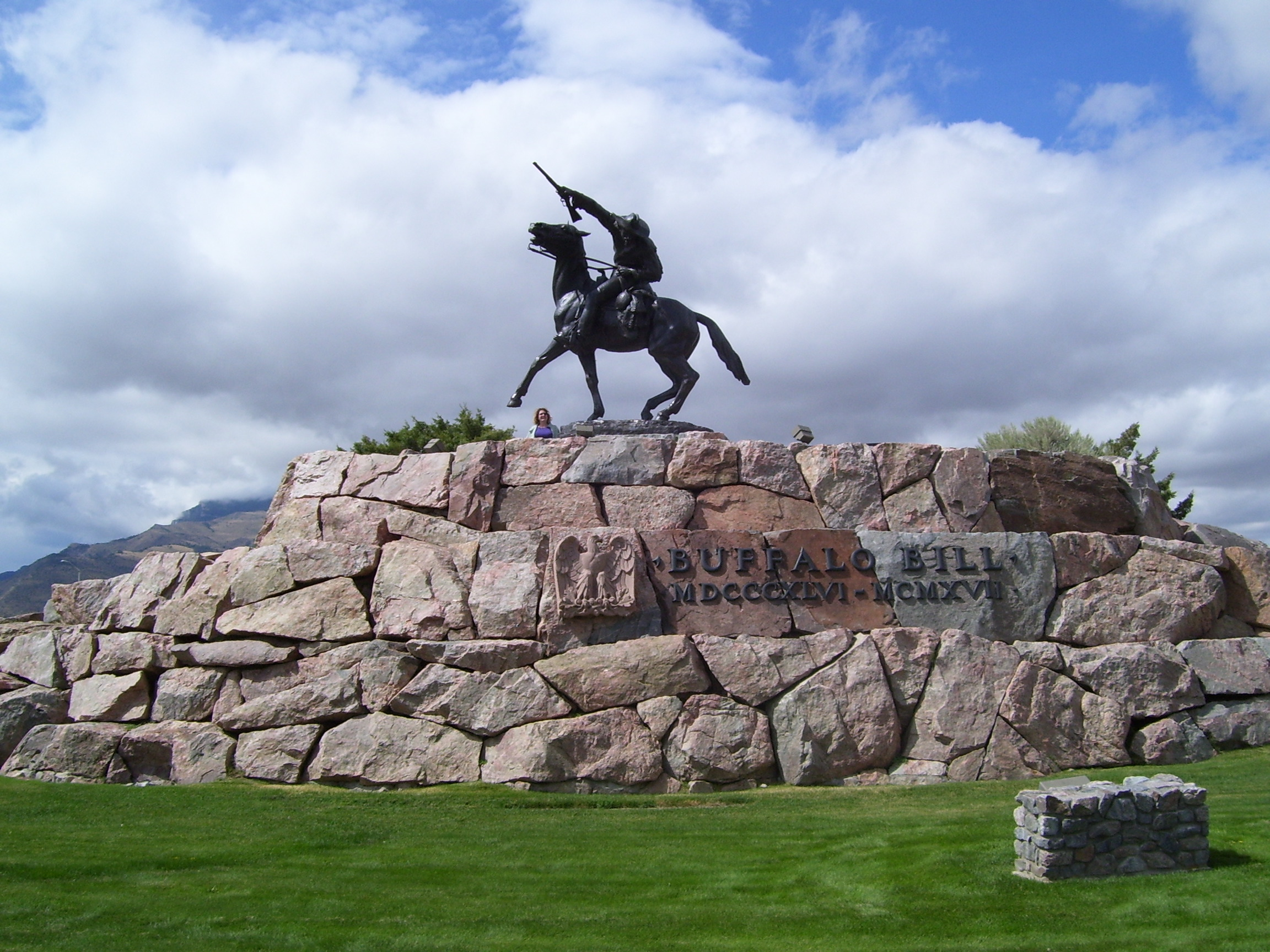

- Location within Wyoming Location within the United States
- Location: 720 Sheridan Avenue, Cody, Wyoming
- Coordinates: 44°31′34″N 109°4′30″W
- Built: 1924
- Architect: Gertrude Vanderbilt Whitney
- NRHP reference No.: 74002319
- Added to NRHP: December 31, 1974

Buffalo Bill – The Scout is a bronze statue of a mounted rider outside the Buffalo Bill Historical Center in Cody, Wyoming, United States, that was placed in 1924 to commemorate the town's most famous resident and de facto founder, Buffalo Bill Cody. Originally in open land on the western outskirts of Cody, the statue now stands at the end of Sheridan Avenue, which became the town's main thoroughfare as Cody grew to the west. The project was initiated by Buffalo Bill Cody's niece, Mary Jester Allen, who had established the basis of what would become the Buffalo Bill Historical Center. A New Yorker, she persuaded heiress and artist Gertrude Vanderbilt Whitney to sculpt the piece.

Despite the offer of two existing sites in Cody, Vanderbilt selected and bought the final Cody site. Her first efforts attracted criticism for the type of horse, its pose, and its tack, all of which were regarded as too "eastern." She then arranged for a horse named "Smokey" from Cody's TE Ranch to be shipped to New York, along with a cowboy from Cody to pose in the saddle. The statue was dedicated on July 4, 1924 in the presence of an unusual number of dignitaries for such a remote location. It stands on a large stone base, meant to represent nearby Cedar Mountain, which Cody chose as his gravesite. The base is a consciously ironic statement, since Cody was buried, against his wishes, at Lookout Mountain in Colorado.

In time, Sheridan Avenue was extended to the statue and loops around the site. The Buffalo Bill Historical Center is located nearby.

Vanderbilt funded most of the estimated $50,000 cost for the memorial out of her own pocket. She would go on to establish the Whitney Museum of American Art in 1931. Her son, Cornelius Vanderbilt Whitney would fund the establishment of the Whitney Museum of Western Art at the Buffalo Bill Historical Center.

The statue's full title is Buffalo Bill – The Scout. The statue was placed on the National Register of Historic Places in 1974.

== See also ==
- Stock Center, the original home of the Buffalo Bill Museum, located across Sheridan Avenue from the Buffalo Bill Historical Center
- Alex Halone House, the Thermopolis, Wyoming, home of the stonemason who built the base of the sculpture, also listed on the National Register of Historic Places
