= Hot Springs County–Thermopolis Municipal Airport =

Airport in Thermopolis, Wyoming

- IATA: THP; ICAO: KHSG

Summary
- Airport type: Public
- Owner: Hot Springs County, Wyoming
- Serves: Thermopolis, Wyoming
- Elevation AMSL: 4,892 ft (1,491 m)
- Coordinates: 43°43′03″N 108°22′49″W

Map
- Location in Wyoming KTHP (the United States)

Hot Springs County–Thermopolis Municipal Airport (IATA: THP, ICAO: KHSG) is a general aviation airport in unincorporated Hot Springs County, Wyoming, 10 miles (16 km) northwest of Thermopolis. The airport was opened in 2015 to replace the original Thermopolis Municipal Airport, which was in the city of Thermopolis, but was unsuitable to expansion. This airport has been discontinued since and now serves as part of the Thermopolis Golf Course.

In the year ending June 30, 2021, the airport had 2,702 aircraft operations, average 52 per week: 94% general aviation, 6% air taxi and <1% military. 10 aircraft at the time were based at the airport: 9 single-engine and 1 multi-engine.

== See also ==
- List of airports in Wyoming
