= Lucerne, Wyoming =

Census-designated place in Hot Springs County, Wyoming, United States

- CDP
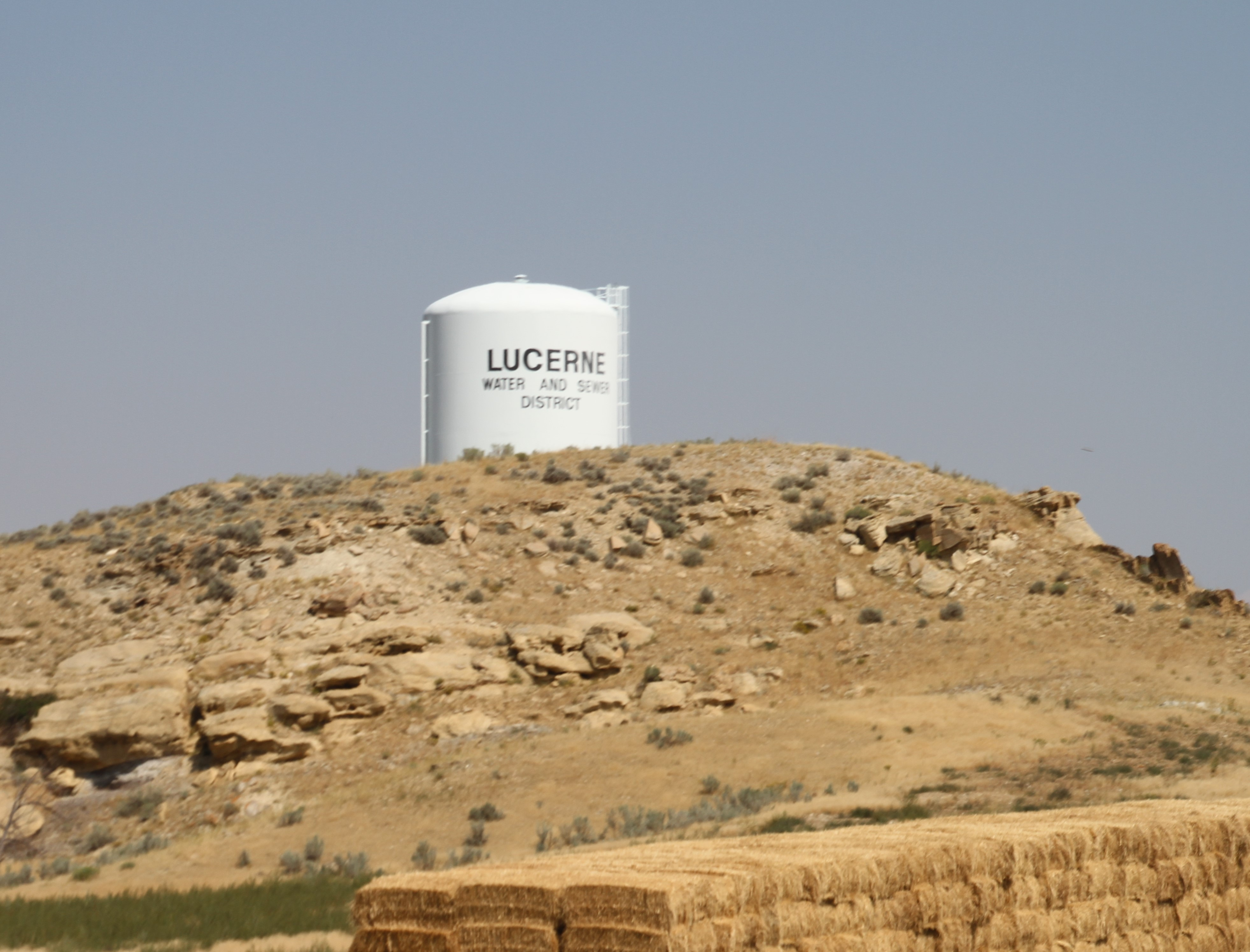
- Water tank in Lucerne, August 2017

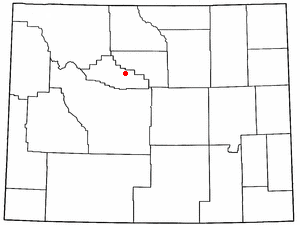
- Location of Lucerne, Wyoming
- Coordinates: 43°42′56″N 108°11′35″W
- Country: United States
- State: Wyoming
- County: Hot Springs

Area
  - Total: 20.6 sq mi (53 km^{2})
  - Land: 19.9 sq mi (52 km^{2})
  - Water: 0.7 sq mi (1.8 km^{2})
- Elevation: 4,331 ft (1,320 m)

Population (2020)
  - Total: 548
  - Density: 27.5/sq mi (10.6/km^{2})
- Time zone: UTC-7 (Mountain (MST))
  - Summer (DST): UTC-6 (MDT)
- Area code: 307
- FIPS code: 56-48240
- GNIS feature ID: 2408151

Lucerne is a census-designated place (CDP) in Hot Springs County, Wyoming, United States. The population was 535 at the 2010 census.

== Geography ==
Lucerne is located on U.S. Route 20 between Thermopolis and Worland.

According to the United States Census Bureau, the CDP has a total area of 20.6 square miles (53.3 km^{2}), of which 19.9 square miles (51.5 km^{2}) is land and 0.7 square mile (1.7 km^{2}) (3.22%) is water.

=== Climate ===
Thermopolis 9NE is a weather station near Lucerne.

Climate data for Thermopolis 9NE, Wyoming, 1991–2020 normals: 4282ft (1305m)
Month	Jan	Feb	Mar	Apr	May	Jun	Jul	Aug	Sep	Oct	Nov	Dec	Year
Record high °F (°C)	59 (15)	65 (18)	77 (25)	87 (31)	94 (34)	100 (38)	101 (38)	101 (38)	98 (37)	88 (31)	74 (23)	64 (18)	101 (38)
Mean maximum °F (°C)	48.6 (9.2)	53.7 (12.1)	70.4 (21.3)	78.6 (25.9)	85.2 (29.6)	93.9 (34.4)	97.7 (36.5)	96.1 (35.6)	90.5 (32.5)	80.4 (26.9)	68.8 (20.4)	53.7 (12.1)	97.6 (36.4)
Mean daily maximum °F (°C)	31.3 (−0.4)	37.7 (3.2)	49.9 (9.9)	58.7 (14.8)	67.6 (19.8)	78.1 (25.6)	88.0 (31.1)	86.1 (30.1)	75.1 (23.9)	60.1 (15.6)	46.0 (7.8)	32.4 (0.2)	59.3 (15.1)
Daily mean °F (°C)	15.4 (−9.2)	22.9 (−5.1)	34.2 (1.2)	42.7 (5.9)	52.0 (11.1)	61.6 (16.4)	69.3 (20.7)	67.1 (19.5)	56.4 (13.6)	43.1 (6.2)	30.1 (−1.1)	16.4 (−8.7)	42.6 (5.9)
Mean daily minimum °F (°C)	−0.4 (−18.0)	8.0 (−13.3)	18.6 (−7.4)	26.7 (−2.9)	36.5 (2.5)	45.0 (7.2)	50.5 (10.3)	48.1 (8.9)	37.6 (3.1)	26.1 (−3.3)	14.2 (−9.9)	0.3 (−17.6)	25.9 (−3.4)
Mean minimum °F (°C)	−23.1 (−30.6)	−18.6 (−28.1)	−0.8 (−18.2)	10.7 (−11.8)	23.7 (−4.6)	34.5 (1.4)	42.4 (5.8)	39.5 (4.2)	28.3 (−2.1)	9.8 (−12.3)	−7.0 (−21.7)	−22.0 (−30.0)	−29.5 (−34.2)
Record low °F (°C)	−35 (−37)	−36 (−38)	−21 (−29)	−5 (−21)	16 (−9)	30 (−1)	36 (2)	33 (1)	25 (−4)	−21 (−29)	−34 (−37)	−38 (−39)	−38 (−39)
Average precipitation inches (mm)	0.37 (9.4)	0.50 (13)	0.89 (23)	1.85 (47)	2.43 (62)	1.34 (34)	0.75 (19)	0.73 (19)	1.23 (31)	1.34 (34)	0.67 (17)	0.51 (13)	12.61 (321.4)
Average snowfall inches (cm)	8.00 (20.3)	7.00 (17.8)	8.50 (21.6)	7.80 (19.8)	0.80 (2.0)	0.00 (0.00)	0.00 (0.00)	0.00 (0.00)	0.30 (0.76)	3.60 (9.1)	6.40 (16.3)	8.40 (21.3)	50.8 (128.96)
Source 1: NOAA
Source 2: XMACIS2 (records & monthly max/mins)

== Demographics ==
As of the census of 2000, there were 525 people, 208 households, and 170 families residing in the CDP. The population density was 26.5 people per square mile (10.2/km^{2}). There were 224 housing units at an average density of 11.3/sq mi (4.4/km^{2}). The racial makeup of the CDP was 98.29% White, 0.19% African American, 0.19% Native American, 0.19% Asian, 0.38% from other races, and 0.76% from two or more races. Hispanic or Latino of any race were 1.52% of the population.

There were 208 households, out of which 30.3% had children under the age of 18 living with them, 74.5% were married couples living together, 4.8% had a female householder with no husband present, and 17.8% were non-families. 15.4% of all households were made up of individuals, and 6.7% had someone living alone who was 65 years of age or older. The average household size was 2.52 and the average family size was 2.79.

In the CDP, the population was spread out, with 23.0% under the age of 18, 5.3% from 18 to 24, 27.0% from 25 to 44, 32.4% from 45 to 64, and 12.2% who were 65 years of age or older. The median age was 43 years. For every 100 females, there were 101.1 males. For every 100 females age 18 and over, there were 102.0 males.

The median income for a household in the CDP was $49,063, and the median income for a family was $47,813. Males had a median income of $24,464 versus $16,083 for females. The per capita income for the CDP was $19,998. About 3.6% of families and 2.7% of the population were below the poverty line, including none of those under the age of eighteen or sixty-five or over.

== Education ==
Public education in the community of Lucerne, along with all other areas in the county, is provided by Hot Springs County School District #1. Schools in the district include Ralph Witters Elementary School (grades K-5), Thermopolis Middle School (grades 6–8), and Hot Springs County High School (grades 9–12).

== See also ==
- List of census-designated places in Wyoming
