= Owl Creek, Wyoming =

- Census-designated place
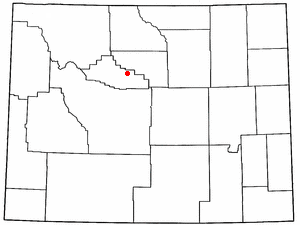
- Location of Owl Creek, Wyoming
- Coordinates: 43°46′55″N 108°34′04″W
- Country: United States
- State: Wyoming
- County: Hot Springs

Area
  - Total: 6.5 sq mi (16.8 km^{2})
  - Land: 6.5 sq mi (16.8 km^{2})
  - Water: 0 sq mi (0.0 km^{2})
- Elevation: 5,650 ft (1,720 m)

Population (2020)
  - Total: 4
  - Density: 0.62/sq mi (0.24/km^{2})
- Time zone: UTC-7 (Mountain (MST))
  - Summer (DST): UTC-6 (MDT)
- Area code: 307
- FIPS code: 56-59332
- GNIS feature ID: 2409006

Owl Creek is a census-designated place (CDP) in Hot Springs County, Wyoming, United States. The population was 4 at the 2020 Census.

== Geography ==
According to the United States Census Bureau, the CDP has a total area of 6.5 square miles (16.8 km^{2}), all of its land.

== Demographics ==
As of the census of 2000, there were 11 people, 4 households, and 3 families residing in the CDP. The population density was 1.7 people per square mile (0.7/km^{2}). There were 11 housing units at an average density of 1.7/sq mi (0.7/km^{2}). The racial makeup of the CDP was 100.00% White.

There were 4 households, out of which 50.0% had children under the age of 18 living with them, 75.0% were married couples living together, and 25.0% were non-families. 25.0% of all households were made up of individuals, and 25.0% had someone living alone who was 65 years of age or older. The average household size was 2.75 and the average family size was 3.33.

In the CDP, the population was spread out, with 36.4% under the age of 18, 27.3% from 25 to 44, 27.3% from 45 to 64, and 9.1% who were 65 years of age or older. The median age was 40 years. For every 100 females, there were 83.3 males. For every 100 females age 18 and over, there were 133.3 males.

The median income for a household in the CDP was $38,393, and the median income for a family was $27,500. Males had a median income of $38,750 versus $0 for females. The per capita income for the CDP was $15,975. About 50.0% of families and 43.4% of the population were below the poverty line, including 45.5% of those under 18 and none of those over 64.

== Education ==
Public education in the community of Owl Creek is provided by Hot Springs County School District #1. Schools in the district include Ralph Witters Elementary School (grades K-5), Thermopolis Middle School (grades 6–8), and Hot Springs County High School (grades 9–12).
