= Dora McGrath =

American politician

- Born: November 15, 1868; North English, Iowa, U.S.
- Died: February 22, 1949 (age 80); Thermopolis, Wyoming, U.S.
- Known for: First woman to serve in the Wyoming Senate

Dora Delena Thomas McGrath (November 15, 1868 – February 22, 1949) was an American politician and clubwoman. In 1930, she became the first woman elected to the Wyoming Senate.

== Early life ==
McGrath was born in North English, Iowa, the daughter of George Wallace Thomas and Nancy Jane Miller Thomas. Her father was a recent Union Army veteran of the American Civil War.

== Career ==
McGrath ran a boarding house and a grocery store, and was a buyer for the McGrath department store in Thermopolis, Wyoming. She was also president of the McGrath Royalty Company, and in 1929, she was founder of the Hot Springs County Pioneer Association. She was first president of the Wyoming chapter of American War Mothers, and successfully campaigned to establish a veteran's hospital in Wyoming. She was active in women's activities at the Protestant Episcopal Church in Thermopolis.

In 1930, McGrath was elected to represent Hot Springs County in the Wyoming Senate. She also served as a delegate from Wyoming to the 1932 Republican National Convention. In 1933 she was assigned to the senate's committee on education and public libraries. She campaigned and voted for the repeal of Prohibition as an unenforceable set of laws.

== Personal life ==
Dora Thomas married twice. Her first husband was James T. Barker; they married in 1885, moved to Wyoming, and had four children. James Barker died from a gunshot wound in 1899, and their daughter Nina died from typhoid fever in 1900. Her second husband was Martin McGrath, her sister's widower; they married in 1902. She gave birth to her fifth child in 1918, at age 50, and her second husband died in 1922. She died in 1949, at the age of 80, in Thermopolis, Her son, Harry Barker, and her grandson Harry Barker Jr. both served in the Wyoming House of Representatives.
