= Kirby Jail and Town Hall =

- U.S. National Register of Historic Places
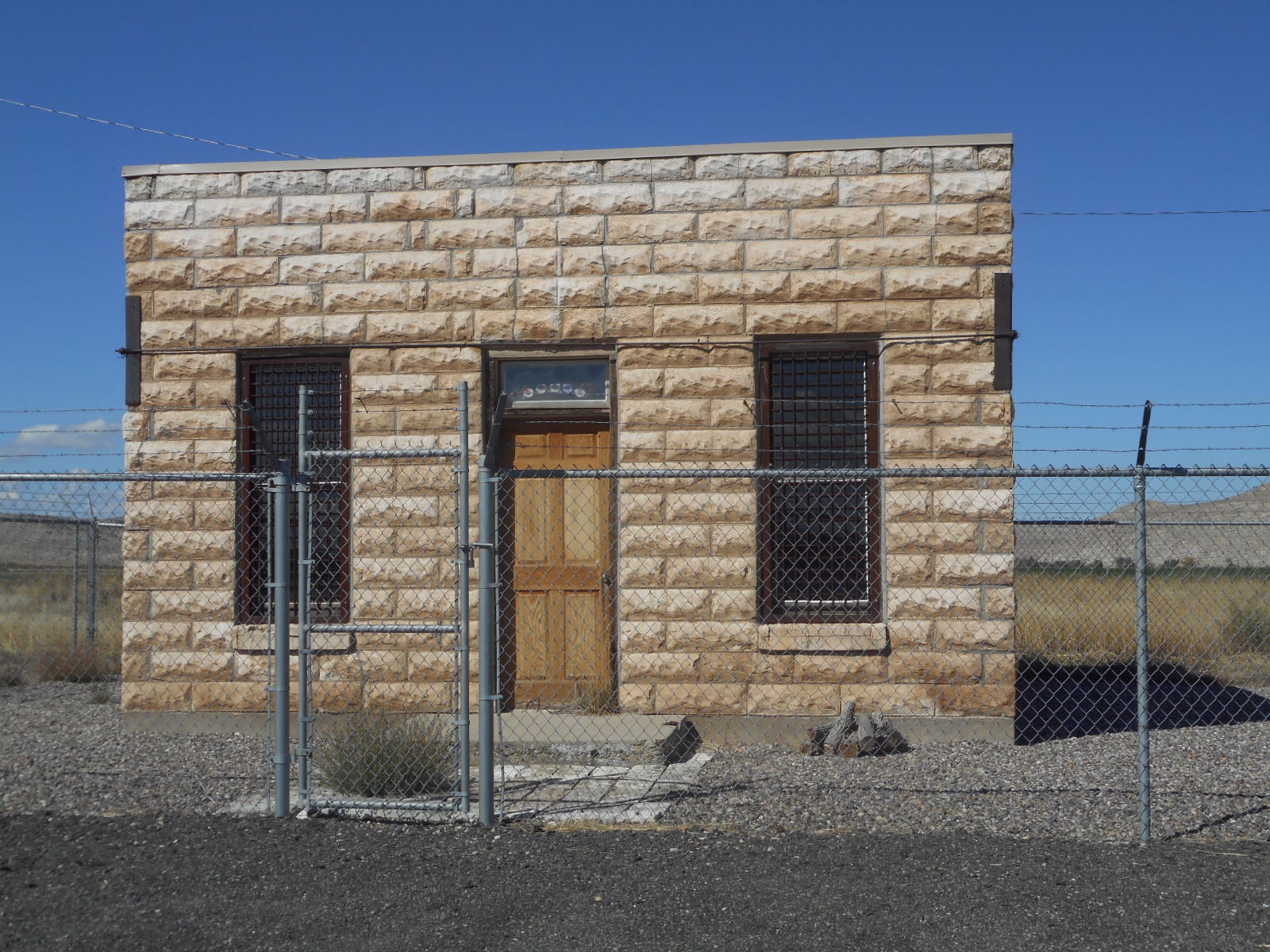

- Location within Wyoming Location within the United States
- Location: 120 E. 4th St., Kirby, Wyoming
- Coordinates: 43°48′18″N 108°10′49″W
- Built: 1915
- Built by: Enders, Pete; I. Hainsworth
- NRHP reference No.: 11000875
- Added to NRHP: December 6, 2011

The Kirby Jail and Town Hall is a historic building located at 120 E. 4th St. in Kirby, Wyoming. Built in 1915, the building was the first and only town building constructed in Kirby, which incorporated the same year. Pete Enders, who also built the local school, constructed and plastered the building, while I. Hainsworth completed the carpentry work. The small jail was designed similarly to other nearby jails from the same era; its design also resembled other buildings in Kirby, such as its schoolhouse. In addition to serving as a jail and town hall, the building was also Kirby's polling place. In 1975, Kirby eliminated its town marshal, and the jail was vacated. The town hall moved to the old schoolhouse, and prisoners were sent to nearby Thermopolis.

The Kirby Jail and Town Hall was added to the National Register of Historic Places on December 6, 2011.
