= East Thermopolis, Wyoming =

- Town
- Location of East Thermopolis in Hot Springs County, Wyoming
- Coordinates: 43°38′39″N 108°11′52″W
- Country: United States
- State: Wyoming
- County: Hot Springs

Area
  - Total: 0.18 sq mi (0.47 km^{2})
  - Land: 0.18 sq mi (0.47 km^{2})
  - Water: 0 sq mi (0.00 km^{2})
- Elevation: 4,341 ft (1,323 m)

Population (2020)
  - Total: 229
  - Density: 1,312.0/sq mi (506.55/km^{2})
- Time zone: UTC-7 (Mountain (MST))
  - Summer (DST): UTC-6 (MDT)
- Area code: 307
- FIPS code: 56-22720
- GNIS feature ID: 2412461

East Thermopolis is a town in Hot Springs County, Wyoming, United States. The population was 229 at the 2020 census.

== History ==
The town of Thermopolis to the west became a town in 1899. It mainly grew on the west side of the river. The east side of the river did have a store, two saloons and an eating house but significantly fewer people. At one time it was known as Andersonville. Before the bridge was built, people had to cross the river by using a rope ferry.

East Thermopolis became its own town when it incorporated in 1948.

== Geography ==
East Thermopolis is near the northern end of the Wind River Canyon and Wedding of the Waters, where the north-flowing Wind River becomes the Bighorn River, an instance of a river changing names at a point other than a confluence of two streams. The dual name is ascribed to the mountain barrier between the Wind River and Bighorn basins, obscuring the fact that the river that drains the two is the same. The term "Wedding of the Waters" dates to at least 1934, when a marker was placed at the location.

East Thermopolis is ringed by mountains, with the Big Horn Mountains to the northeast, the Bridger Mountains to the southeast, the Owl Creek Mountains to the southwest and the Absaroka Range to the northwest. East Thermopolis is at the very southern end of the Bighorn Basin.

According to the United States Census Bureau, the town has a total area of 0.18 square miles (0.47 km^{2}), all land.

== Demographics ==
Historical population
Census	Pop.	Note	%±
1950	246		—
1960	281		14.2%
1970	316		12.5%
1980	359		13.6%
1990	221		−38.4%
2000	274		24.0%
2010	254		−7.3%
2020	229		−9.8%
U.S. Decennial Census

=== 2010 census ===
As of the census of 2010, there were 254 people, 157 households, and 56 families residing in the town. The population density was 1,411.1 inhabitants per square mile (544.8/km^{2}). There were 186 housing units at an average density of 1,033.3 per square mile (399.0/km^{2}). The racial makeup of the town was 93.7% White, 0.8% African American, 3.9% Native American, 0.4% from other races, and 1.2% from two or more races. Hispanic or Latino of any race were 0.8% of the population.

There were 157 households, of which 7.6% had children under the age of 18 living with them, 31.8% were married couples living together, 1.9% had a female householder with no husband present, 1.9% had a male householder with no wife present, and 64.3% were non-families. 60.5% of all households were made up of individuals, and 42.1% had someone living alone who was 65 years of age or older. The average household size was 1.55 and the average family size was 2.36.

The median age in the town was 64.8 years. 11.4% of residents were under the age of 18; 3.5% were between the ages of 18 and 24; 9% were from 25 to 44; 26.7% were from 45 to 64; and 49.2% were 65 years of age or older. The gender makeup of the town was 47.2% male and 52.8% female.

=== 2000 census ===
As of the census of 2000, there were 274 people, 150 households, and 61 families residing in the town. The population density was 1,565.8 people per square mile (622.3/km^{2}). There were 166 housing units at an average density of 948.6 per square mile (377.0/km^{2}). The racial makeup of the town was 91.97% White, 0.36% African American, 1.46% Native American, 1.09% from other races, and 5.11% from two or more races. Hispanic or Latino of any race were 3.65% of the population.

There were 150 households, out of which 16.0% had children under the age of 18 living with them, 31.3% were married couples living together, 7.3% had a female householder with no husband present, and 59.3% were non-families. 56.0% of all households were made up of individuals, and 38.7% had someone living alone who was 65 years of age or older. The average household size was 1.75 and the average family size was 2.61.

In the town, the population was spread out, with 21.2% under the age of 18, 4.7% from 18 to 24, 16.1% from 25 to 44, 25.5% from 45 to 64, and 32.5% who were 65 years of age or older. The median age was 55 years. For every 100 females, there were 79.1 males. For every 100 females age 18 and over, there were 64.9 males.

The median income for a household in the town was $18,056, and the median income for a family was $30,313. Males had a median income of $21,250 versus $17,386 for females. The per capita income for the town was $11,280. About 7.0% of families and 16.8% of the population were below the poverty line, including 9.8% of those under the age of eighteen and 22.4% of those 65 or over.

== Government ==
East Thermopolis has a mayor and town council. Gary Holbert was elected mayor in 2022.

== Education ==
Public education in the town of East Thermopolis is provided by Hot Springs County School District #1. Schools in the district include Ralph Witters Elementary School (grades K-5), Thermopolis Middle School (grades 6-8), and Hot Springs County High School (grades 9-12).
