= Gebo, Wyoming =

- Unincorporated community
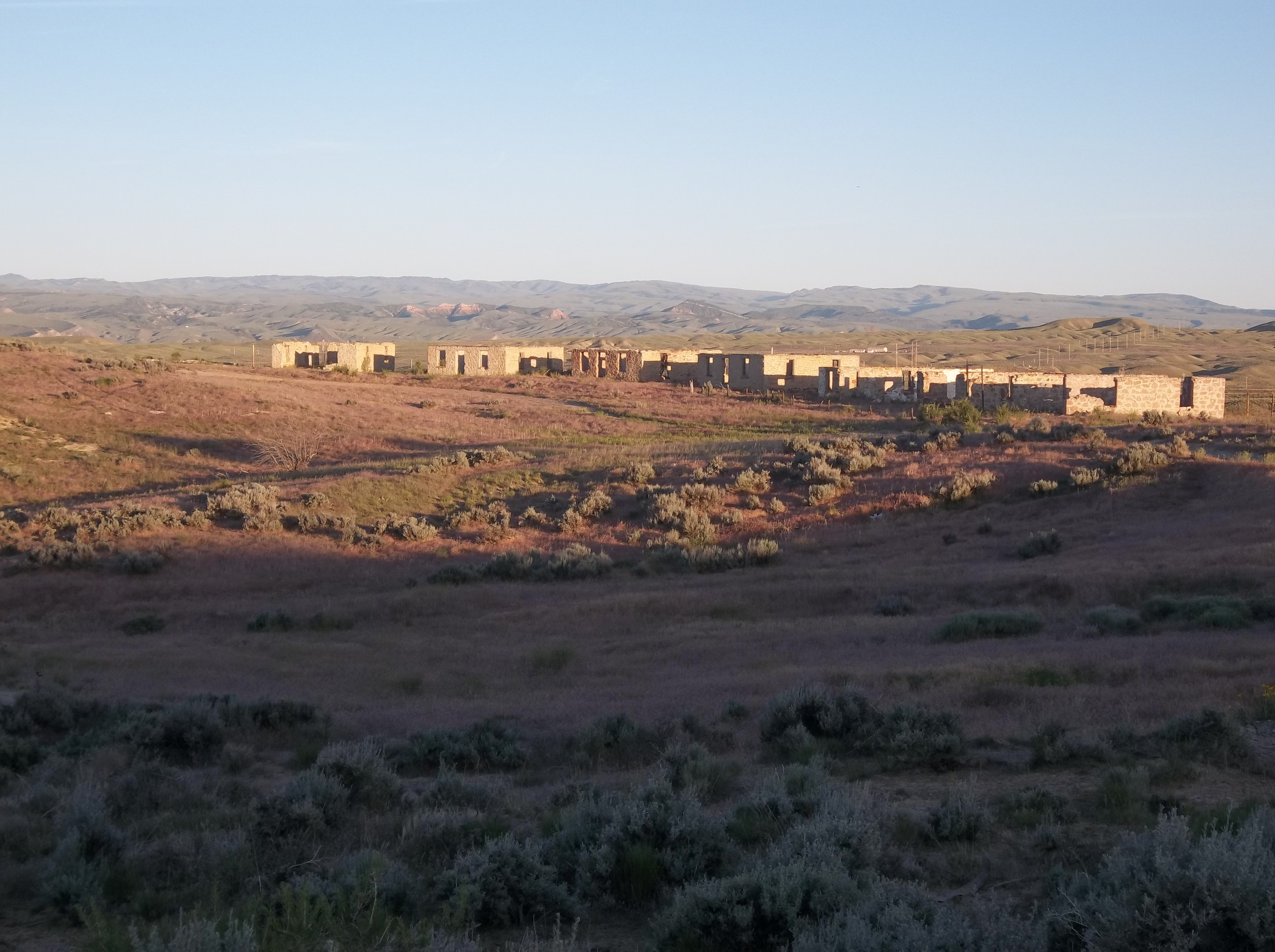
- Gebo in the evening

- Location within Wyoming Location within the United States
- Coordinates: 43°47′27″N 108°13′49″W
- Country: United States
- State: Wyoming
- County: Hot Springs
- Elevation: 4,491 ft (1,369 m)
- Time zone: UTC-7 (Mountain (MST))
  - Summer (DST): UTC-6 (MDT)
- Area code: 307
- GNIS feature ID: 1588848

Gebo is a ghost town located in Hot Springs County in the U.S. state of Wyoming. It is located approximately 11 miles (18 km) north of Thermopolis.

The town was established as a coal town in 1907 alongside the nearby camps of Crosby and Kirby. It was named after Samuel Wilford Gebo who established the Owl Creek Coal Company and the first mine in the area after immigrating to America from Canada. Mining remained active until 1938. At its height, over 2,000 people lived in the area, mostly miners and their families, making Gebo briefly the largest town in the county.

The remains of the town were bulldozed in 1971, though some buildings and the cemetery remain.

== See also ==
- Gebo, Montana
