= Hot Springs County School District Number 1 =

School district in Wyoming, United States

Hot Springs County School District #1 is a public school district based in Thermopolis, Wyoming, United States.

== Geography ==
Hot Springs County School District #1 serves all of Hot Springs County, including the following communities:

- Incorporated places
  - Town of East Thermopolis
  - Town of Kirby
  - Town of Thermopolis
- Census-designated places (Note: All census-designated places are unincorporated.)
  - Lucerne
  - Owl Creek

== Schools ==
- Hot Springs County High School (Grades 9–12)
- Thermopolis Middle School (Grades 6–8)
- Ralph Witters Elementary School (Grades K-5)

== Student demographics ==
The following figures are as of October 1, 2020.

- Total District Enrollment: 644
- Student enrollment by gender
  - Male: 339 (52.64%)
  - Female: 305 (47.36%)
- Student enrollment by ethnicity
  - White (not Hispanic): 563 (87.42%)
  - Hispanic: 36 (5.59%)
  - American Indian or Alaskan Native: 11 (1.71%)
  - Black (not Hispanic): 5 (0.78%)
  - Asian or Pacific Islander: 1 (0.16%)

== See also ==
- List of school districts in Wyoming
