= Legend Rock =

Coordinates: 43°47′53″N 108°36′05″W

- Legend Rock Petroglyph Site
- U.S. National Register of Historic Places
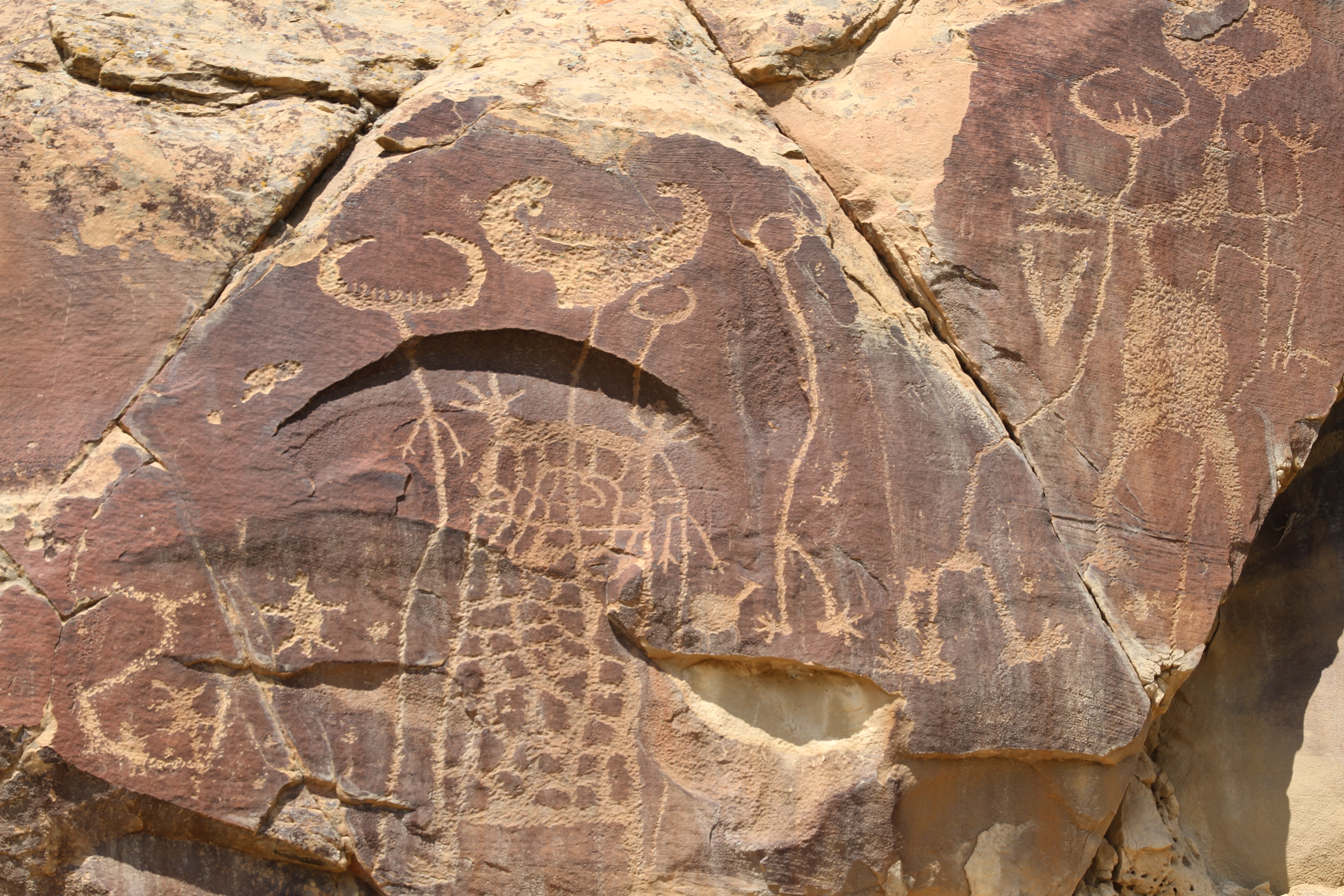

- Location within Wyoming Location within the United States
- Location: Hot Springs County, Wyoming
- Nearest city: Thermopolis, Wyoming
- NRHP reference No.: 73001932
- Added to NRHP: July 5, 1973

Legend Rock Petroglyph Site is located in Hot Springs County, Wyoming, 20 miles northwest of Hot Springs State Park (which is located in Thermopolis, Wyoming). Legend Rock is a petroglyph site which features hundreds of individual petroglyphs spread across the face of the rock. Although a handful of the rock's etchings have variously been eroded and defaced, a wide majority have been preserved for public viewing. The nearly 300 individual petroglyphs feature some of the oldest and best examples of Dinwoody rock art in the world. The origins of the petroglyphs are still subject to debate. The site was listed on the National Register of Historic Places on July 5, 1973 and it is preserved by the state of Wyoming as a state historic site.
