= Allen Hogg =

American politician

Member of the Wyoming House of Representatives from the 28th district
- member-elect
- Assumed office January 4, 2027
- Preceded by: John Winter

Personal details
- Party: Republican
- Website: Campaign website

Allen Hogg is an American politician. A member of the Republican Party, he is the member-elect of the Wyoming House of Representatives for the 28th district. He was elected at the 2026 election. He is a rancher from the Upper Greybull River country. The Hogg Ranch near Meeteetse, Wyoming has been worked since 1918.
