= Callaghan Apartments =

- U.S. National Register of Historic Places
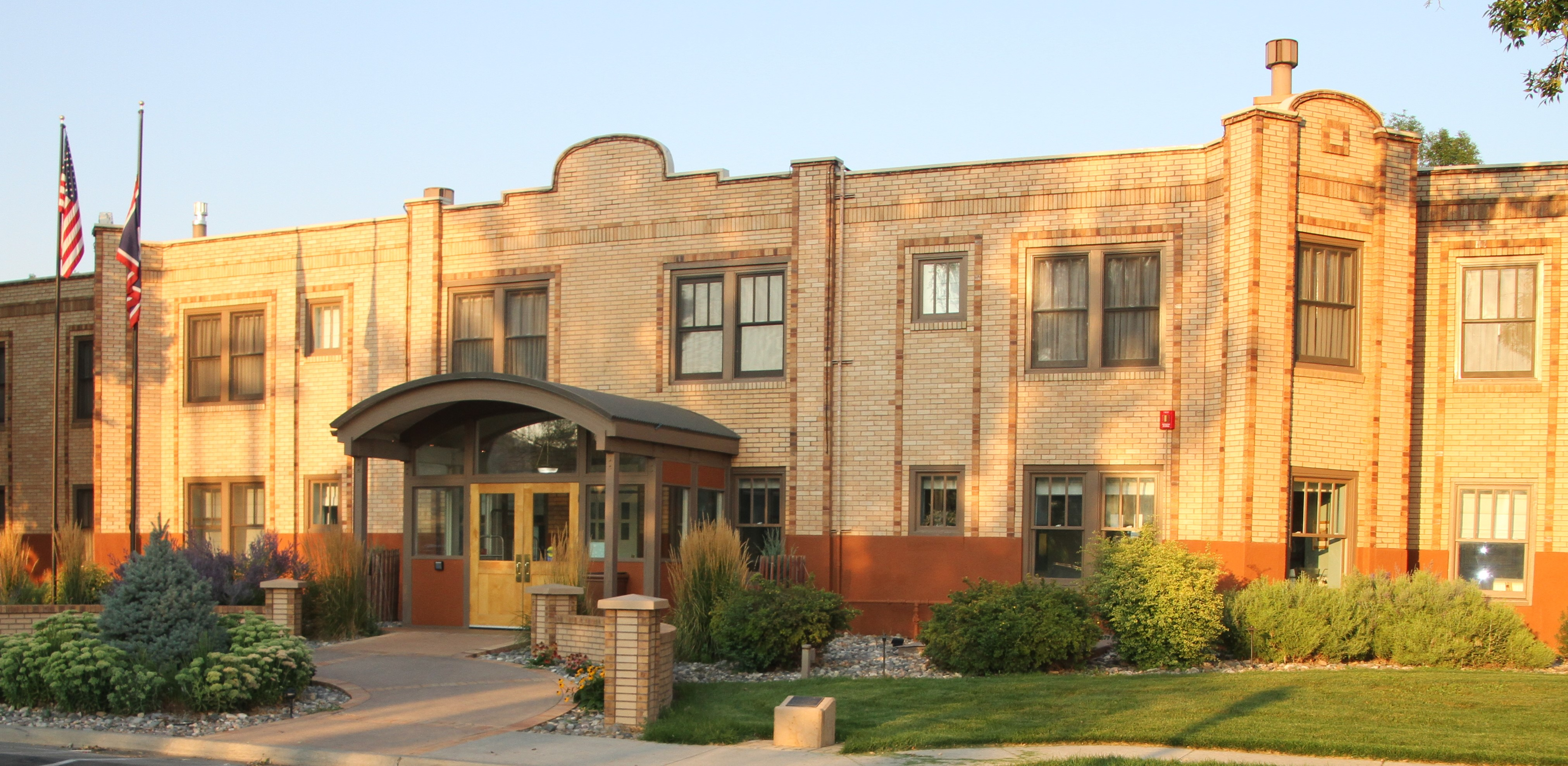
- The building seen from the west in 2017

- Location within Wyoming Location within the United States
- Location: 116 East Park Street, Thermopolis, Wyoming
- Coordinates: 43°39′2″N 108°11′54″W
- Built: 1918
- Architect: Callaghan, William H.; Holdrege, Fred E.
- Architectural style: Colonial Revival
- NRHP reference No.: 93000231
- Added to NRHP: March 29, 1993

The Callaghan Apartments, also known as the Plaza Apartments and Hotel and the Plaza Hotel, was erected in 1918 in Hot Springs State Park in Thermopolis, Wyoming. It was at one time one of six hotels catering to tourists using the Big Spring of Thermopolis, a hot spring reputed to possess curative properties. The hotel was erected by bricklayer James Callaghan, who obtained a 98-year lease on the site commencing on January 1, 1918. Callaghan made his own bricks in a kiln he built on the site, completing the Callaghan Apartments in June 1918. He employed several nurses and a masseur for his guests. In 1921 Callaghan sold the property to Dr. P.W. Metz who renamed it The Plaza.

The two-story yellow brick building overlooks the Big Horn River and originally had 70 rooms with a common bathroom at the end of each hall. The baths were once provided with mineral water. The building is U-shaped in plan, facing east with a concrete foundation under the central portion and stone foundations under the wings. The exterior walls are capped and accented by red bricks in a soldier course. Two-story window bays are outlined in red brick soldiers, and bays are marked with decorative red brick arches. The building was divided into 14 hallways, each with a bath. A spa area was divided into men's and women's areas with soaking tubs and a steam sauna, using 127-degree water from the Big Spring. The hot water was piped in a loop under the Big Horn River to temper it for bathing.

The Plaza was renovated in 1999 and remains a hotel. It was placed on the National Register of Historic Places in 1993.
