= CQA Four Mile Bridge =

- U.S. National Register of Historic Places
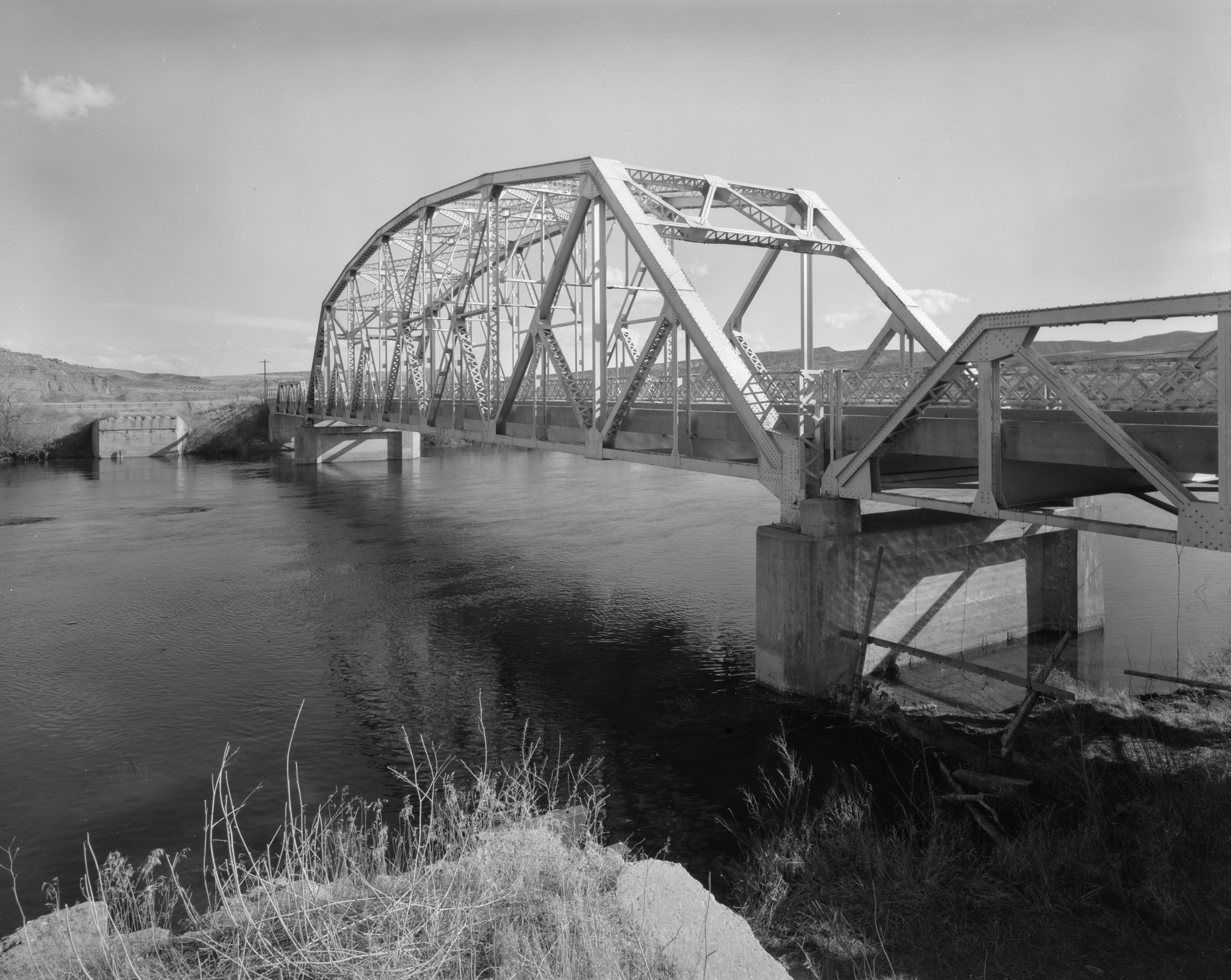

- Location within Wyoming Location within the United States
- Nearest city: Thermopolis, Wyoming
- Coordinates: 43°36′13″N 108°11′48″W
- Built: 1927
- Built by: Charles M. Smith Company
- Architectural style: Pennsylvania through truss
- MPS: Vehicular Truss and Arch Bridges in Wyoming TR
- NRHP reference No.: 85000423
- Added to NRHP: February 22, 1985

The CQA Four Mile Bridge spans the Big Horn River in Hot Springs County, Wyoming. The bridge was erected in 1927-28 by the Charles M. Smith Company and spans 175 feet (53 m) with a total length of 295 feet (90 m). The rigid 7-panel Pennsylvania through-truss was nominated for inclusion on the National Register of Historic Places as one of forty bridges throughout Wyoming that collectively illustrate steel truss construction, a technique of bridge design that has become obsolete since the mid-twentieth century. The bridge rests on concrete piers and abutments and is approached by two Warren pony trusses.

The Four Mile Bridge was placed on the National Register of Historic Places in 1985.

== See also ==
- List of bridges documented by the Historic American Engineering Record in Wyoming
