= Grass Creek, Wyoming =

- Unincorporated community
- Location within Wyoming Location within the United States
- Coordinates: 43°56′25″N 108°38′54″W
- Country: United States
- State: Wyoming
- County: Hot Springs
- Elevation: 5,588 ft (1,703 m)
- Time zone: UTC-7 (Mountain (MST))
  - Summer (DST): UTC-6 (MDT)
- Area code: 307
- GNIS feature ID: 1802958

Grass Creek is an unincorporated community in Hot Springs County, Wyoming, United States. Grass Creek is 30 miles (48 km) northwest of Thermopolis. The Legend Rock Petroglyph Site, which is listed on the National Register of Historic Places, is located near Grass Creek.

Grass Creek had its own school until 1974, when it closed due to low enrollment. It also had a post office with ZIP Code 82425, which operated through at least 1977.
