= Lorraine Quarberg =

American politician (born 1952)

Majority Whip of the Wyoming House of Representatives
- In office 2009 – January 8, 2013

Member of the Wyoming House of Representatives from the 28th district
- In office January 11, 2005 – January 8, 2013
- Preceded by: Michael R. Baker
- Succeeded by: Nathan Winters

Personal details
- Born: February 10, 1952 (age 74) Cheyenne, Wyoming, U.S.
- Party: Republican
- Spouse: DeLoyd
- Children: 2
- Education: University of Wyoming; Central Wyoming College
- Profession: Politician, farmer, rancher, economic development consultant

Lorraine Quarberg (born February 10, 1952) is an American politician, farmer, rancher, and economic development consultant from Thermopolis, Wyoming, who served in the Wyoming House of Representatives from 2005 to 2013, representing the 28th legislative district of Wyoming as a Republican. She served as House Majority Whip from 2009 to 2013.

== Early life ==
Lorraine Quarberg was born in Cheyenne, Wyoming, on February 10, 1952. She attended both the University of Wyoming and Central Wyoming College.

== Career ==
Quarberg served in the Wyoming House of Representatives from 2005 to 2013, representing the 28th legislative district of Wyoming as a Republican. She served as House Majority Whip from 2009 to 2013. (Note: According to the Wyoming Legislature, Quarberg served in the legislature from 2005 to 2012, serving as House Majority Whip from 2005 to 2012.)

During her time in office, Quarberg served on the following standing committees:

- Education (2005–2006)
- Minerals, Business and Economic Development (2005–2008)
- Corporations, Elections and Political Subdivision (2007–2008)
- Judiciary (2009–2010)
- Rules and Procedure (2009–2012)
- Transportation, Highways and Military Affairs (2011–2012)

Additionally, Quarberg served on the Select Committee on School Finance in 2005, the Community College Planning Task Force in 2008, and the Multistate Highway Transportation Agreement Cooperating Committee in 2011. She also served on the Select Water Committee every year of her tenure.

In 2010, Quarberg ran opposed in both the Republican primary and the general election. She declined to run for re-election in 2012.

Outside of politics, Quarberg worked as a farmer, rancher, and economic development consultant.

== Political positions ==
During her time in office, Quarberg was the main sponsor of House Bill 113, which would have made Wyoming one of three states at the time (the other two being Alaska and Vermont) to not require a permit for concealed carry. The bill was co-sponsored by fellow Republican state senator Cale Case.

Quarberg received a 100% rating from the National Federation of Independent Business between 2005 and 2006. She received an A+ rating from the NRA Political Victory Fund in 2010.

== Personal life ==
Quarberg currently resides in Thermopolis, Wyoming. She is married and has two children.

Quarberg is Catholic.

== Electoral history ==
2010 Wyoming Senate District 28 general election
Party	Candidate	Votes	%
Republican	Lorraine Quarberg	2,655	96.86
Write-in		86	3.14
Total votes		2,741	100.0
Republican hold			

Republican primary results
Party	Candidate	Votes	%
Republican	Lorraine Quarberg	1,931	97.28
Write-in		54	2.72
Total votes		1,985	100.0

== Notes ==
Wyoming House of Representatives
Preceded by Michael R. Baker	Member of the Wyoming House of Representatives from the 28th district 2005–2013	Succeeded by Nathan Winters
Wyoming House of Representatives
Preceded by —	Majority Whip of the Wyoming House of Representatives; 2009–2013	Succeeded by —
