= Kirby, Wyoming =

Town in Hot Springs County, Wyoming, United States

- Town
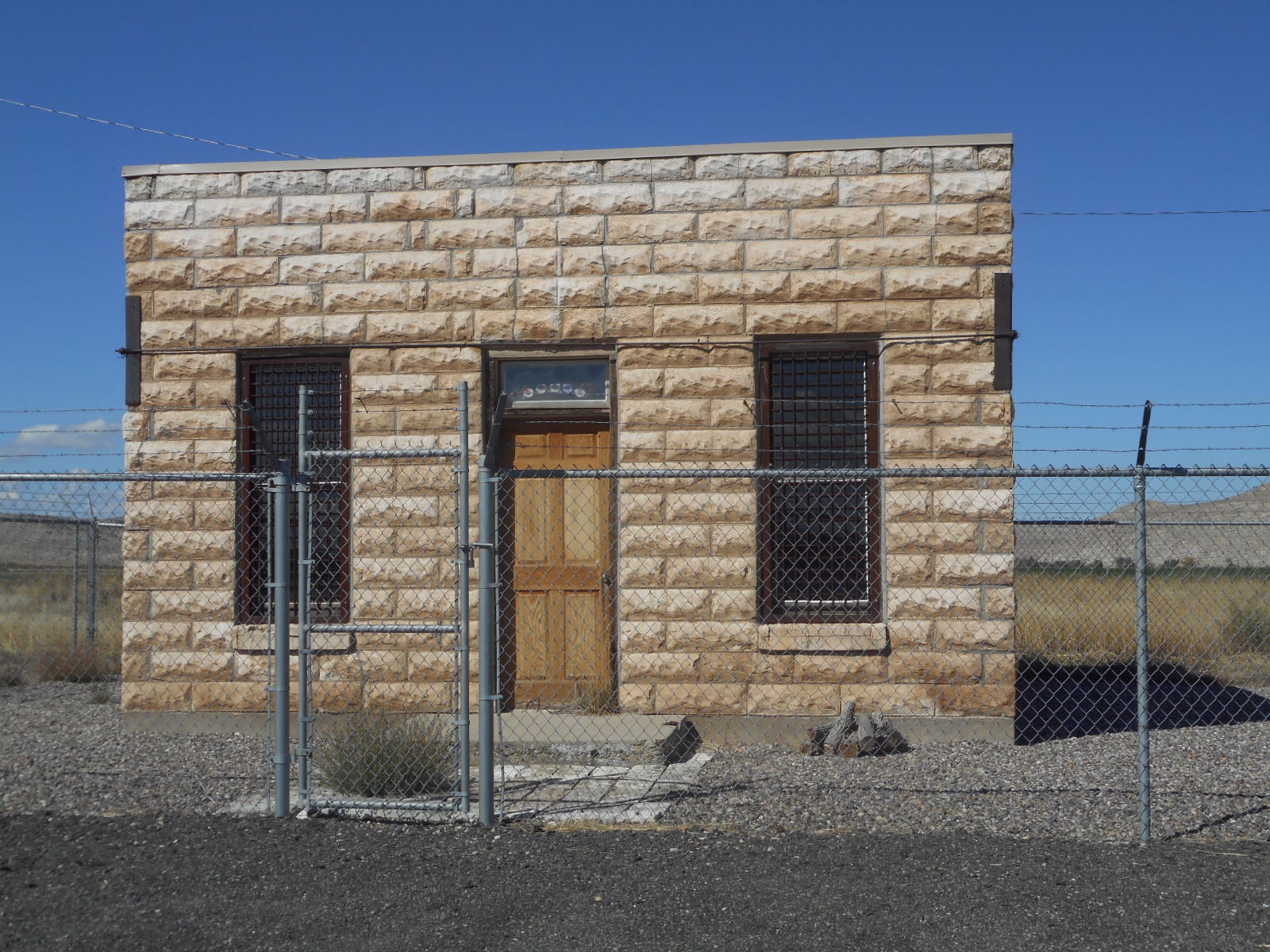
- Former jail

- Location of Kirby in Hot Springs County, Wyoming
- Coordinates: 43°48′12″N 108°10′52″W
- Country: United States
- State: Wyoming
- County: Hot Springs

Area
  - Total: 0.15 sq mi (0.40 km^{2})
  - Land: 0.15 sq mi (0.40 km^{2})
  - Water: 0 sq mi (0.00 km^{2})
- Elevation: 4,269 ft (1,301 m)

Population (2020)
  - Total: 76
  - Density: 550.5/sq mi (212.53/km^{2})
- Time zone: UTC-7 (Mountain (MST))
  - Summer (DST): UTC-6 (MDT)
- ZIP code: 82430
- Area code: 307
- FIPS code: 56-42730
- GNIS feature ID: 2412840

Kirby is a town in Hot Springs County, Wyoming, United States.

The town was established as a coal town in 1907 alongside the nearby camps of Crosby and Gebo.

The population was 76 at the 2020 census. The town is home to Wyoming Whiskey, the state's first whiskey distillery, and was the only one in the state until 2017. Wyoming Whiskey began production in 2009 in a facility constructed by the General Steel Corporation.

== Geography ==
According to the United States Census Bureau, the town has a total area of 0.15 square miles (0.39 km^{2}), all land.

== Demographics ==
Historical population
Census	Pop.	Note	%±
1920	174		—
1930	173		−0.6%
1940	107		−38.2%
1950	99		−7.5%
1960	82		−17.2%
1970	75		−8.5%
1980	129		72.0%
1990	59		−54.3%
2000	57		−3.4%
2010	92		61.4%
2020	76		−17.4%
U.S. Decennial Census

=== 2010 census ===
As of the census of 2010, there were 92 people, 30 households, and 24 families residing in the town. The population density was 613.3 inhabitants per square mile (236.8/km^{2}). There were 38 housing units at an average density of 253.3 per square mile (97.8/km^{2}). The racial makeup of the town was 95.7% White and 4.3% from other races. Hispanic or Latino of any race were 4.3% of the population.

There were 30 households, of which 46.7% had children under the age of 18 living with them, 66.7% were married couples living together, 13.3% had a female householder with no husband present, and 20.0% were non-families. 10.0% of all households were made up of individuals. The average household size was 3.07 and the average family size was 3.38.

The median age in the town was 29.3 years. 33.7% of residents were under the age of 18; 7.6% were between the ages of 18 and 24; 33.7% were from 25 to 44; 19.6% were from 45 to 64; and 5.4% were 65 years of age or older. The gender makeup of the town was 39.1% male and 60.9% female.

=== 2000 census ===
As of the census of 2000, there were 57 people, 29 households, and 14 families residing in the town. The population density was 524.5 people per square mile (200.1/km^{2}). There were 37 housing units at an average density of 340.5 per square mile (129.9/km^{2}). The racial makeup of the town was 94.74% White, 3.51% Asian, and 1.75% from two or more races. Hispanic or Latino of any race were 7.02% of the population.

There were 29 households, out of which 17.2% had children under the age of 18 living with them, 37.9% were married couples living together, 6.9% had a female householder with no husband present, and 48.3% were non-families. 48.3% of all households were made up of individuals, and 17.2% had someone living alone who was 65 years of age or older. The average household size was 1.97 and the average family size was 2.67.

In the town, the population was spread out, with 17.5% under the age of 18, 5.3% from 18 to 24, 24.6% from 25 to 44, 40.4% from 45 to 64, and 12.3% who were 65 years of age or older. The median age was 46 years. For every 100 females, there were 78.1 males. For every 100 females age 18 and over, there were 62.1 males.

The median income for a household in the town was $18,750, and the median income for a family was $43,125. Males had a median income of $18,750 versus $30,417 for females. The per capita income for the town was $19,137. There were 18.2% of families and 12.2% of the population living below the poverty line, including no under eighteens and 50.0% of those over 64.

== Education ==
Public education in the town of Kirby is provided by Hot Springs County School District #1. Schools in the district include Ralph Witters Elementary School (grades K-5), Thermopolis Middle School (grades 6–8), and Hot Springs County High School (grades 9–12).

== See also ==
- List of municipalities in Wyoming
