= Downtown Thermopolis Historic District =

Historic district in Wyoming, United States

- U.S. National Register of Historic Places
- U.S. Historic district
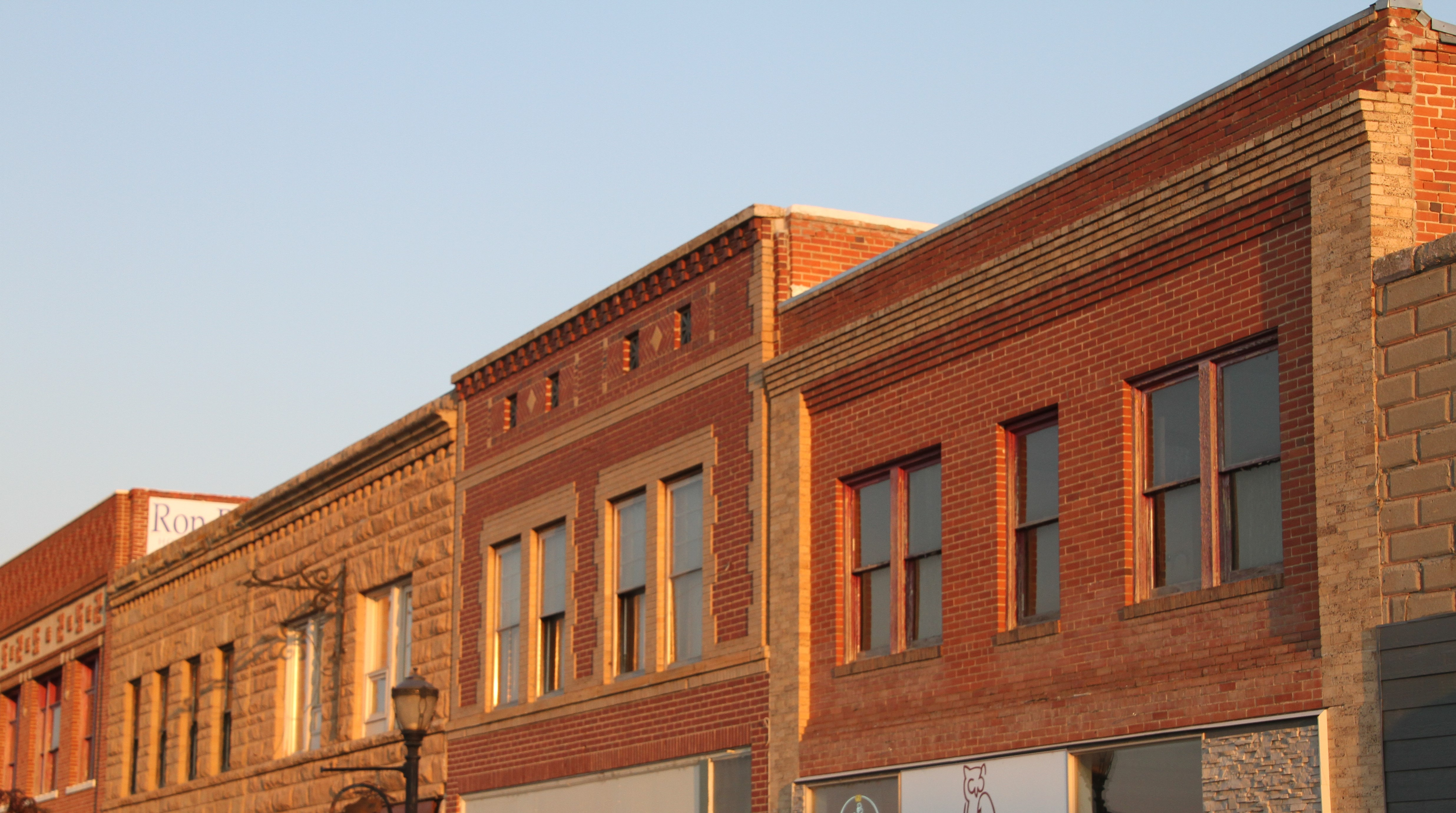

- Location within Wyoming Location within the United States
- Location: Broadway, 5th and 6th Streets, Thermopolis, Wyoming
- Coordinates: 43°38′46″N 108°12′37″W
- Area: 4 acres (1.6 ha)
- Architect: Multiple
- NRHP reference No.: 84003668 (original); 100008220 (increase)

Significant dates
- Added to NRHP: May 10, 1984
- Boundary increase: September 26, 2022

The Downtown Thermopolis Historic District comprises the central business district of Thermopolis, Wyoming. The district comprises the main street, Broadway, and Fifth Street. The buildings lining the street were built between 1898 and 1923 in styles ranging from adaptations of commercial style to Victorian. The town was planned as a unit in 1896 after the land was acquired from the Shoshone and Arapaho. Broadway, as implied by its name, was built wide enough to accommodate teams of 16 mules or horses.

The Downtown Thermopolis Historic District was listed on the National Register of Historic Places in 1984, with a boundary increase in 2022.
