= John Winter (Wyoming politician) =

American politician

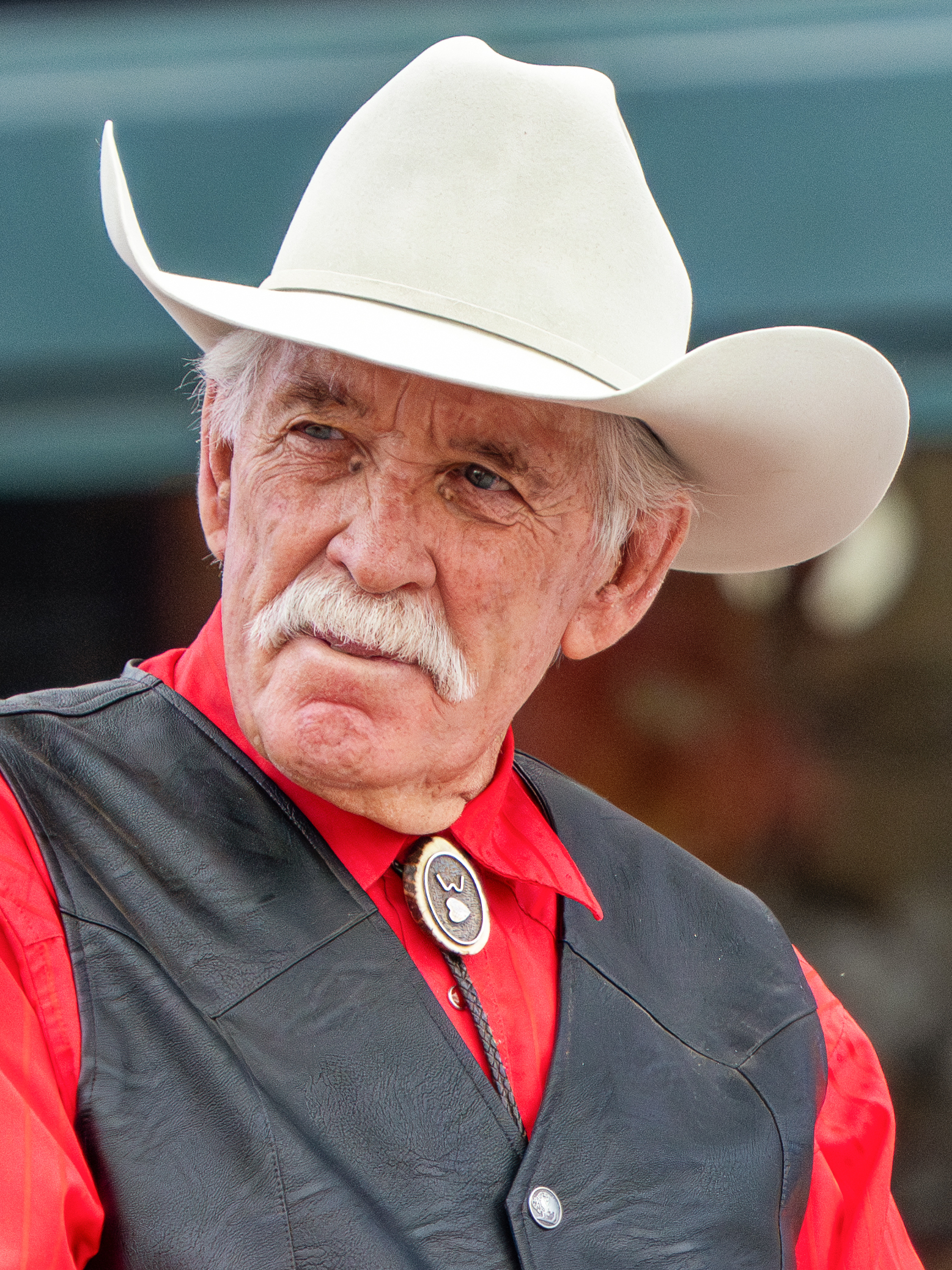

Member of the Wyoming House of Representatives from the 28th district
- Incumbent
- Assumed office January 7, 2019
- Preceded by: Nathan Winters
- Succeeded by: Allen Hogg (elect)

Personal details
- Born: Cody, Wyoming, U.S.
- Party: Republican
- Spouse: S. Diane Winter
- Children: 10
- Education: University of Wyoming

John Winter is an American politician who has represented the 28th District in the Wyoming House of Representatives since 2019.

== Early life ==
Winter was born in Cody, Wyoming, United States.

== Education ==
Winter graduated from University of Wyoming in 1972 with a B.S. in range management.

== Career ==
On November 6, 2018, Winter was first elected to the Wyoming House of Representatives, where he represents the 28th district. He won with 75.1% of the vote. Winter assumed office on January 7, 2019. Winter is a Republican.

He defeated Democrat Levi Shinkle on November 3, 2020 with 81.6% of the vote. Following his reelection, he supported an attempt to get the Wyoming Attorney General to join Texas in a lawsuit seeking to overturn presidential election results in four states (Texas v. Pennsylvania).

In February 2021, he voted in favor of a bill that would have "given students the tools to help friends with suicidal thoughts."

Winter approves of slaughtering federally protected wild horses in Wyoming. During the Wyoming Legislature’s session earlier this year, some lawmakers supported a resolution calling on Congress to re-open U.S. horse slaughter plants, which haven’t operated since 2007.

“The next thing that’s really hampering this whole effort (toward mustang management) is the fact that these horses cannot be slaughtered for meat,” Rep. John Winter, R-Thermopolis, said at the time. “We used to have a slaughter plant in North Platte, Nebraska, and it worked very well.”

On Wednesday, Winter told Cowboy State Daily that he still favors horse slaughter. He’s reached out to Wyoming’s Congressional delegation regarding the anti-horse slaughter bills, but hadn’t yet gotten a response.

Winter said that people who oppose horse slaughter might have concerns about animal welfare. However, he thinks that shutting slaughterhouses down has actually made things worse for both mustangs and domestic horses.

Rep. Winter said he wants Congress make changes to the Wild Horse and Burro Act of 1971. One of those changes is to allow the slaughter of the wild horses which he said outcompete other species for grazing and water.

Winter’s resolution states that best management practices for wild horses would include allowing for equine slaughter and processing for shipment to accommodating markets inside and outside the United States.https://www.wyoleg.gov/Legislation/2023/HJ0003

== Personal life ==
Winter is a member of the Church of Jesus Christ of Latter-day Saints. Winter is married to S. Diane Winter, and has ten children. As of November 2021, he has 33 grandchildren.
