= Nathan Winters =

American politician

Member of the Wyoming House of Representatives from the 28th district
- In office January 8, 2013 – January 8, 2019
- Preceded by: Lorraine Quarberg
- Succeeded by: John Winter

Personal details
- Party: Republican
- Spouse: Christie

Nathan Winters is an American politician and a Republican member of the Wyoming House of Representatives representing District 28 from January 8, 2013, until his successor, John Winter, was seated January 8, 2019. Winters is a 2003 graduate of West Coast Baptist College. Winters founded Family Policy Alliance of Wyoming in 2019 which became Wyoming Family Alliance in 2022.

== Elections ==
- 2012: When Republican representative Lorraine Quarberg retired and left the District 28 seat open, Winters won the three-way August 21, 2012 Republican primary with 1,403 votes (55.8%), and the November 6, 2012, general election with 3,288 votes (74.5%) against Democratic nominee Connie Skates.
- 2014: Winters ran unopposed during the 2014 election cycle
- 2016: Winters ran unopposed during the primary and won the general election by 75.2% of the vote against Democratic Party nominee Howard Samelson.
- 2018: Winters lost the primary election for Wyoming State Auditor to Kristi Racines.
