= Hot Springs County High School =

Coordinates: 43.6498°N 108.2060°W

Location
- 231 Park St; Thermopolis, Hot Springs County, Wyoming

Information
- Type: Public
- School district: Hot Springs County School District Number 1
- Principal: Maryn Hillman
- Athletic Director: Brandon Deromedi
- Teaching staff: 15.88 (on an FTE basis)
- Grades: 9-12
- Enrollment: 284 (2024–2025)
- Student to teacher ratio: 11.59
- Colors: Purple and Gold
- Athletics: WHSAA Class 2A
- Mascot: Bobcat
- Team name: Thermopolis Bobcats
- Website: https://hschs.hotsprings1.org/

Hot Springs County High School is a high school located in Thermopolis, Wyoming. The school is part of Hot Springs County School District Number 1 and teaches students grades 9 through 12. The school is accredited by the Wyoming State Board of Education and the North Central Association of Colleges and Schools.

== Athletics ==
Athletics at Hot Springs County High School, as well as Thermopolis Middle School, compete under the moniker of the Thermopolis Bobcats. The Bobcats colors are purple and gold.

The Bobcats track & field and football programs play their games at LeRoy Hayes Field, dedicated for former Wyoming Coaches Association Board President, 3A Wrestling Coach of the Year and Assistant Football Coach of the Year LeRoy Hayes. The unofficial capacity of LeRoy Hayes Field sits at 1,370 spectators, and the playing surface consists of natural grass. The facility also makes use of restrooms and concession stands, which can be found on the north end of the stadium.

The Bobcats play their volleyball, girls basketball, boys basketball and wrestling matches inside of the school's gymnasium, built in 2006. The facility underwent a renovation of the court surface in the summer of 2023, and now incorporates a landscape of the mountains surrounding Thermopolis inlaid into the wood of the gym floor.

As of the 2024 WHSAA class realignment, the Bobcats athletic programs compete in WHSAA Class 2A for all sports. Prior to 2024, the Bobcats were in Class 3A for volleyball, basketball, and track and field, and were only in Class 2A for football, cross-country, and wrestling.

| Sport | Year(s) |
|---|---|
| Boys Cross-Country | No titles |
| Girls Cross-Country | 2018 |
| Volleyball | No titles |
| Football | 1928 - 1929 - 1932 - 1990 - 1991 - 1992 - 2009 - 2010 |
| Boys Golf | 1979 - 1980 - 2012 - 2014 - 2015 - 2018 - 2019 - 2020 - 2021 - 2022 - 2024 |
| Girls Golf | 2007 - 2008 - 2023 - 2025 |
| Boys Wrestling | No titles |
| Girls Wrestling | No titles |
| Boys Basketball | 1952 - 1954 - 1974 - 2003 - 2004 - 2025 - 2026 |
| Girls Basketball | 1978 - 2002 - 2003 |
| Boys Track and Field | 1922 - 1923 - 1925 - 1926 - 1927 - 1929 - 1932 - 2014 |
| Girls Track and Field | No titles |
