= Hot Springs County, Wyoming =

County in Wyoming, United States

- County
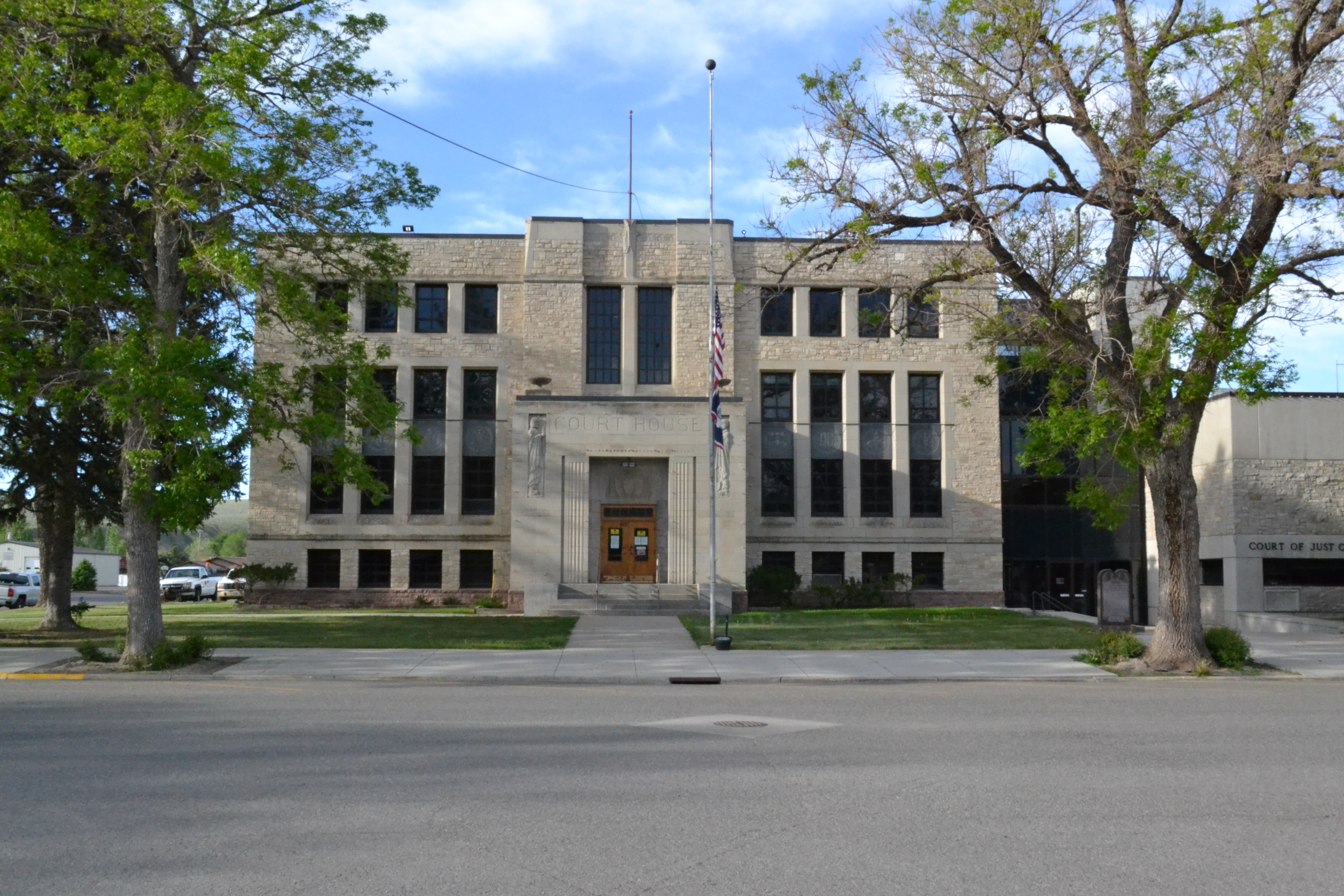
- Hot Springs County Courthouse

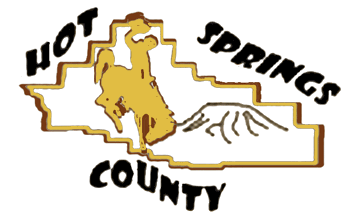
- Flag

- Location within the U.S. state of Wyoming
- Coordinates: 43°43′N 108°26′W
- Country: United States
- State: Wyoming
- Founded: February 21, 1911 (established); 1913 (organized)
- Named for: Hot springs in the area
- Seat: Thermopolis
- Largest town: Thermopolis

Area
  - Total: 2,006 sq mi (5,200 km^{2})
  - Land: 2,004 sq mi (5,190 km^{2})
  - Water: 2.3 sq mi (6.0 km^{2}) 0.1%

Population (2020)
  - Total: 4,621
  - Estimate (2025): 4,600 ▼
  - Density: 2.306/sq mi (0.8903/km^{2})
- Time zone: UTC−7 (Mountain)
  - Summer (DST): UTC−6 (MDT)
- Congressional district: At-large
- Website: www.hscounty.com

Hot Springs County is a county in the U.S. state of Wyoming. As of the 2020 census, the population was 4,621, making it the second-least populous county in Wyoming. Its county seat is Thermopolis. The county is named for the hot springs located in Hot Springs State Park.

== History ==
Hot Springs County was created on February 21, 1911, with areas annexed from Big Horn, Fremont, and Park counties. It was organized in 1913.

Hot Springs County was named for the hot springs located in the county seat of Thermopolis.

In the 2008 United States presidential election, Hot Springs County was the only county in the entire Mountain West outside of Arizona where John McCain beat George W. Bush's percentage of the county vote from the 2004 election.

== Geography ==
According to the US Census Bureau, the county has a total area of 2,006 square miles (5,200 km^{2}), of which 2,004 square miles (5,190 km^{2}) is land and 2.3 square miles (6.0 km^{2}) (0.1%) is water, which gives it nearly twice the land area of Rhode Island and a slightly larger land area than Delaware. It is the smallest county in Wyoming by area and the largest county in the US that is a state's smallest county.

Hot Springs County includes the southern portion of Wyoming's Big Horn Basin, and is surrounded by mountains. Most of the Wind River Canyon, with the Owl Creek Mountains on the west and Bridger Mountains on the east is in Hot Springs County, while the Bighorn Mountains ring the east portion on the county and the Absaroka Range is to the west. A small portion of the Shoshone National Forest is in the western part of the county.

The Wind River Indian Reservation extends into southern Hot Springs County.

=== Adjacent counties ===
- Washakie County – northeast
- Fremont County – south and southwest
- Park County – northwest and north

=== National protected area ===
- Shoshone National Forest (part)

== Demographics ==
Historical population
Census	Pop.	Note	%±
1920	5,164		—
1930	5,476		6.0%
1940	4,607		−15.9%
1950	5,250		14.0%
1960	6,365		21.2%
1970	4,952		−22.2%
1980	5,710		15.3%
1990	4,809		−15.8%
2000	4,882		1.5%
2010	4,812		−1.4%
2020	4,621		−4.0%
2025 (est.)	4,600	▼	−0.5%
US Decennial Census; 1870–2000 2010–2016

=== 2020 census ===
As of the 2020 census, the county had a population of 4,621. Of the residents, 20.9% were under the age of 18 and 27.8% were 65 years of age or older; the median age was 48.9 years. For every 100 females there were 101.4 males, and for every 100 females age 18 and over there were 97.8 males.

Hot Springs County, Wyoming – Racial and ethnic composition Note: the US Census treats Hispanic/Latino as an ethnic category. This table excludes Latinos from the racial categories and assigns them to a separate category. Hispanics/Latinos may be of any race.
Race / Ethnicity (NH = Non-Hispanic)	Pop 2000	Pop 2010	Pop 2020	% 2000	% 2010	% 2020
White alone (NH)	4,614	4,550	4,142	94.51%	94.55%	89.63%
Black or African American alone (NH)	17	12	9	0.35%	0.25%	0.19%
Native American or Alaska Native alone (NH)	73	62	42	1.50%	1.29%	0.91%
Asian alone (NH)	10	20	18	0.20%	0.42%	0.39%
Pacific Islander alone (NH)	0	3	3	0.00%	0.06%	0.06%
Other race alone (NH)	1	0	16	0.02%	0.00%	0.35%
Mixed race or Multiracial (NH)	51	60	214	1.04%	1.25%	4.63%
Hispanic or Latino (any race)	116	105	177	2.38%	2.18%	3.83%
Total	4,882	4,812	4,621	100.00%	100.00%	100.00%

The racial makeup of the county was 91.3% White, 0.3% Black or African American, 1.1% American Indian and Alaska Native, 0.4% Asian, 0.7% from some other race, and 6.1% from two or more races. Hispanic or Latino residents of any race comprised 3.8% of the population.

There were 2,034 households in the county, of which 24.1% had children under the age of 18 living with them and 25.0% had a female householder with no spouse or partner present. About 34.5% of all households were made up of individuals and 18.5% had someone living alone who was 65 years of age or older.

There were 2,551 housing units, of which 20.3% were vacant. Among occupied housing units, 72.0% were owner-occupied and 28.0% were renter-occupied. The homeowner vacancy rate was 4.1% and the rental vacancy rate was 20.6%.

=== 2010 census ===
As of the 2010 United States census, there were 4,812 people, 2,185 households, and 1,362 families in the county. The population density was 2.4 people per square mile (0.93 people/km^{2}). There were 2,582 housing units at an average density of 1.3 units per square mile (0.50 units/km^{2}). The racial makeup of the county was 95.8% white, 1.5% American Indian, 0.4% Asian, 0.2% black or African American, 0.1% Pacific islander, 0.5% from other races, and 1.5% from two or more races. Those of Hispanic or Latino origin made up 2.2% of the population. In terms of ancestry, 30.1% were German, 15.3% were Irish, 15.1% were English, 8.4% were Scotch-Irish, and 8.3% were American.

Of the 2,185 households, 23.5% had children under the age of 18 living with them, 50.5% were married couples living together, 8.3% had a female householder with no husband present, 37.7% were non-families, and 32.6% of all households were made up of individuals. The average household size was 2.16 and the average family size was 2.70. The median age was 48.6 years.

The median income for a household in the county was $42,469 and the median income for a family was $54,709. Males had a median income of $41,186 versus $26,990 for females. The per capita income for the county was $25,269. About 6.8% of families and 9.1% of the population were below the poverty line, including 12.2% of those under age 18 and 5.7% of those age 65 or over.

=== 2000 census ===
As of the 2000 United States census, there were 4,882 people, 2,108 households, and 1,353 families in the county. The population density was 2 people per square mile (0.77 people/km^{2}). There were 2,536 housing units at an average density of 1.3 units per square mile (0.50 units/km^{2}). The racial makeup of the county was 95.96% White, 0.35% Black or African American, 1.52% Native American, 0.25% Asian, 0.63% from other races, and 1.29% from two or more races. 2.38% of the population were Hispanic or Latino of any race. 23.3% were of German, 17.0% English, 12.2% Irish, 8.2% American and 6.0% Norwegian ancestry.

There were 2,108 households, out of which 25.50% had children under the age of 18 living with them, 54.30% were married couples living together, 7.40% had a female householder with no husband present, and 35.80% were non-families. 31.70% of all households were made up of individuals, and 14.80% had someone living alone who was 65 years of age or older. The average household size was 2.25 and the average family size was 2.82.

The county population contained 22.00% under the age of 18, 5.90% from 18 to 24, 23.30% from 25 to 44, 28.70% from 45 to 64, and 20.00% who were 65 years of age or older. The median age was 44 years. For every 100 females there were 92.70 males. For every 100 females age 18 and over, there were 89.80 males.

The median income for a household in the county was $29,888, and the median income for a family was $39,364. Males had a median income of $27,030 versus $18,667 for females. The per capita income for the county was $16,858. About 8.60% of families and 10.60% of the population were below the poverty line, including 12.10% of those under age 18 and 7.90% of those age 65 or over.

== Communities ==
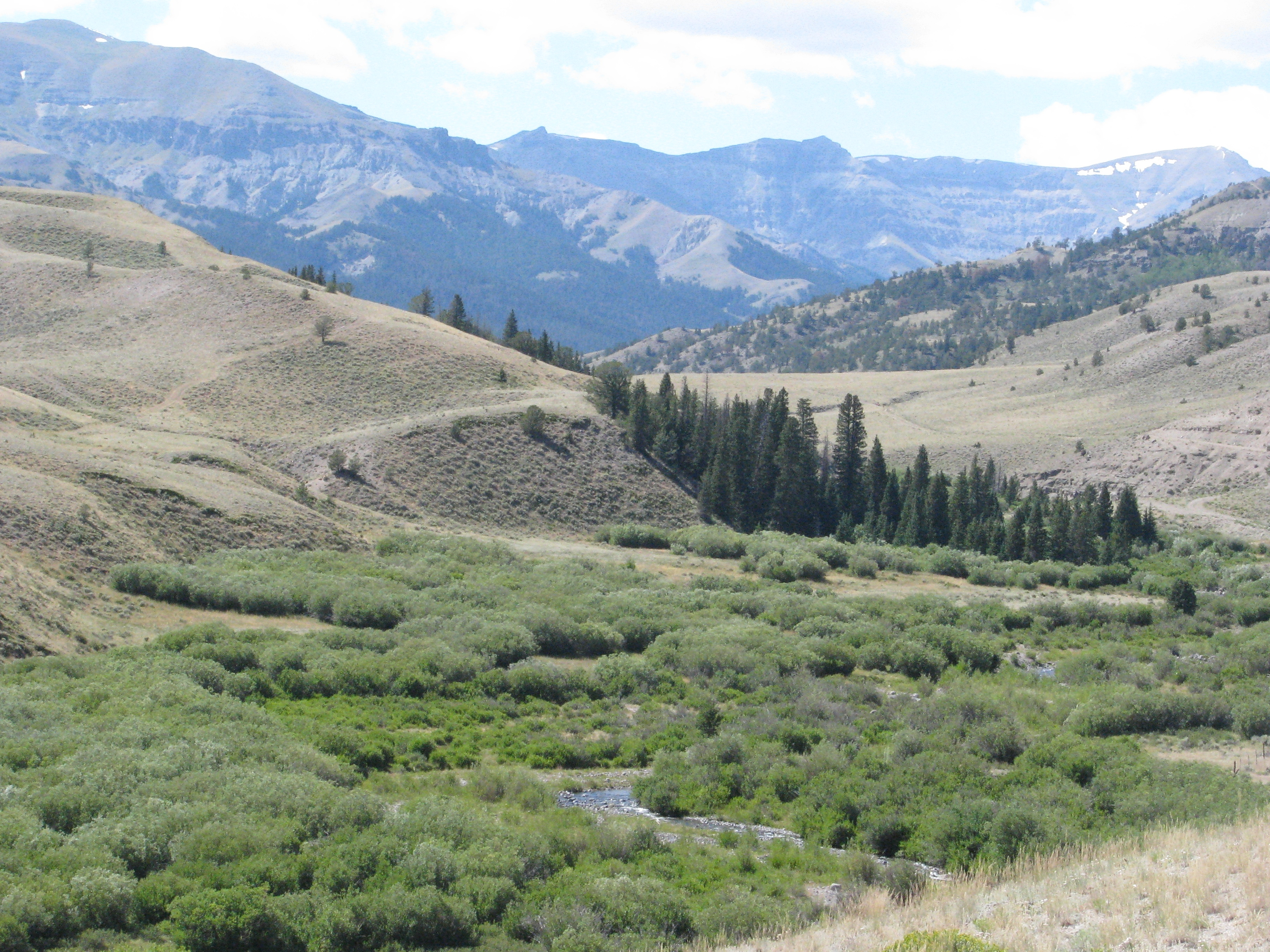
South Fork of Owl Creek

=== Towns ===
- East Thermopolis
- Kirby
- Thermopolis (county seat)

=== Census-designated places ===
- Lucerne
- Owl Creek

=== Unincorporated communities ===
- Embar
- Grass Creek
- Wedding of the Waters

=== Ghost towns ===
- Gebo

== Government and infrastructure ==
The Wyoming Department of Health Wyoming Pioneer Home, a nursing home for elderly people, is located in Thermopolis. The facility was operated by the Wyoming Board of Charities and Reform until that agency was dissolved as a result of a state constitutional amendment passed in November 1990.

Hot Springs County voters have been reliably Republican for many decades. In only one national election since 1948, that being in Lyndon Johnson's 1964 landslide did the county select the Democratic Party candidate, and in fact, Donald Trump's 2024 performance was the highest overall percentage of the vote any Presidential candidate of either major party in the county's history.

United States presidential election results for Hot Springs County, Wyoming
Year	Republican		Democratic		Third party(ies)	
Year	No.	%	No.	%	No.	%
1912	273	27.14%	343	34.10%	390	38.77%
1916	523	37.33%	760	54.25%	118	8.42%
1920	1,212	64.61%	529	28.20%	135	7.20%
1924	1,011	45.73%	231	10.45%	969	43.83%
1928	1,220	55.33%	940	42.63%	45	2.04%
1932	742	31.53%	1,466	62.30%	145	6.16%
1936	796	34.33%	1,419	61.19%	104	4.48%
1940	913	41.61%	1,266	57.70%	15	0.68%
1944	877	47.51%	969	52.49%	0	0.00%
1948	791	44.84%	928	52.61%	45	2.55%
1952	1,573	64.68%	856	35.20%	3	0.12%
1956	1,663	62.99%	977	37.01%	0	0.00%
1960	1,659	59.19%	1,144	40.81%	0	0.00%
1964	1,228	47.09%	1,380	52.91%	0	0.00%
1968	1,273	59.38%	705	32.88%	166	7.74%
1972	1,678	70.89%	689	29.11%	0	0.00%
1976	1,413	59.39%	958	40.27%	8	0.34%
1980	1,602	62.70%	745	29.16%	208	8.14%
1984	1,943	73.43%	672	25.40%	31	1.17%
1988	1,490	64.11%	800	34.42%	34	1.46%
1992	978	40.77%	740	30.85%	681	28.39%
1996	1,348	55.34%	779	31.98%	309	12.68%
2000	1,733	73.68%	544	23.13%	75	3.19%
2004	1,812	73.06%	623	25.12%	45	1.81%
2008	1,834	72.03%	619	24.31%	93	3.65%
2012	1,895	75.35%	523	20.80%	97	3.86%
2016	1,939	74.98%	400	15.47%	247	9.55%
2020	1,999	77.57%	482	18.70%	96	3.73%
2024	2,082	79.47%	488	18.63%	50	1.91%

== Education ==
There is one school district in the entire county: Hot Springs County School District 1.

== See also ==
- National Register of Historic Places listings in Hot Springs County, Wyoming
- Clayton Danks
- Wyoming
  - List of cities and towns in Wyoming
  - List of counties in Wyoming
  - Wyoming statistical areas
