= Thermopolis, Wyoming =

- Town
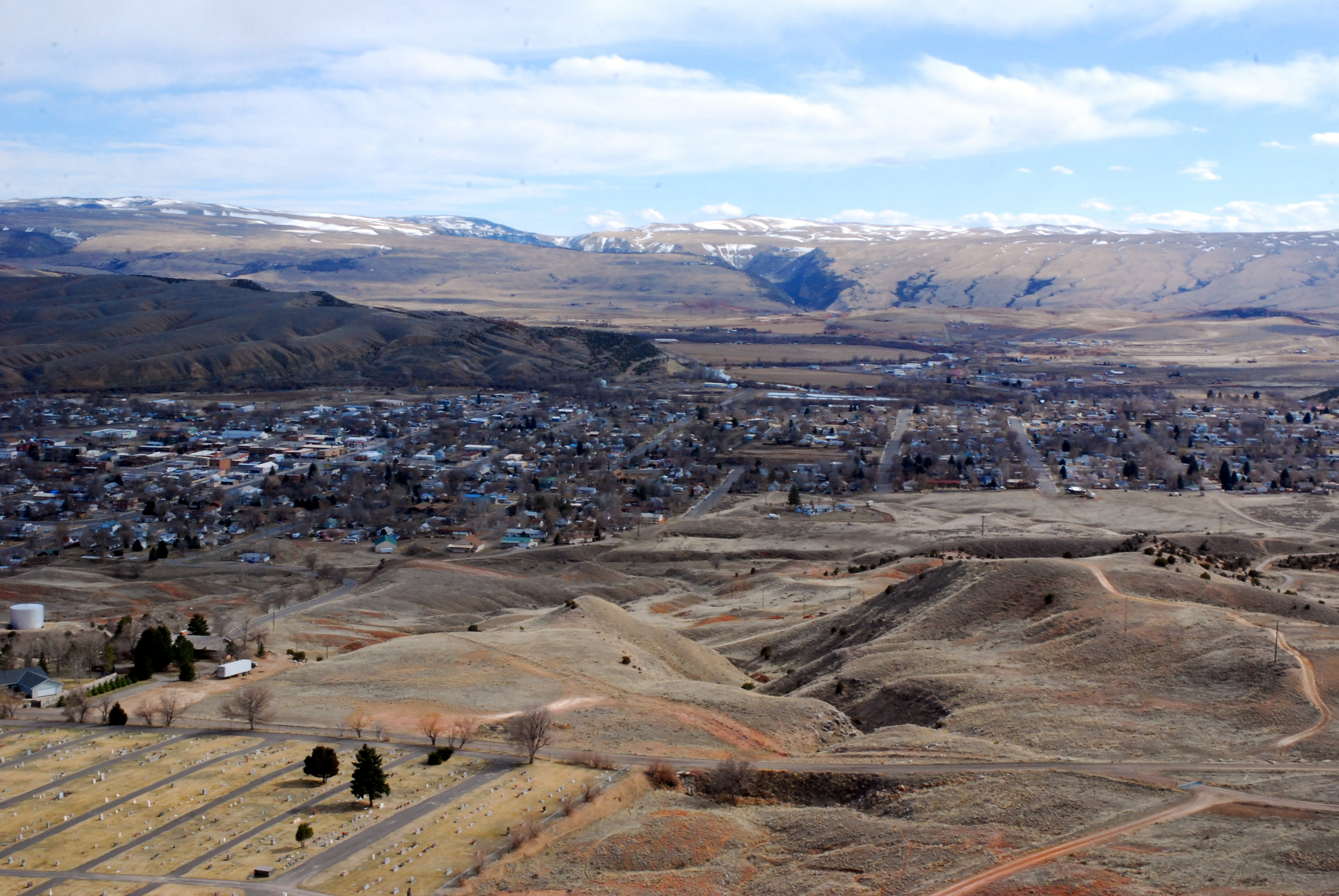
- Thermopolis viewed from Roundtop Mountain
- Nickname: "Thermop" "T-Town"
- Motto: "A Past To Behold, A Future To Uphold"
- Location of Thermopolis in Hot Springs County, Wyoming.
- Coordinates: 43°38′52″N 108°12′50″W
- Country: United States
- State: Wyoming
- County: Hot Springs
- Named for: Greek for "Hot City", named for the county's natural hot springs

Area
  - Total: 2.47 sq mi (6.39 km^{2})
  - Land: 2.39 sq mi (6.18 km^{2})
  - Water: 0.081 sq mi (0.21 km^{2})
- Elevation: 4,334 ft (1,321 m)

Population (2020)
  - Total: 2,725
  - Density: 1,158.0/sq mi (447.11/km^{2})
- Demonym: Thermopolite
- Time zone: UTC−7 (Mountain (MST))
  - Summer (DST): UTC−6 (MDT)
- ZIP code: 82443
- Area code: 307
- FIPS code: 56-76515
- GNIS feature ID: 2413384
- Website: thermopoliswy.gov

Thermopolis is the county seat and most populous town in Hot Springs County, Wyoming, United States. As of the 2020 census, Thermopolis had a population of 2,725.

Thermopolis, Greek for "hot city", is the location of numerous natural hot springs, in which mineral-laden waters are heated by geothermal processes.

The town claims the world's largest mineral hot spring, "The Big Spring", as part of Hot Springs State Park. The springs are open to the public for free as part of an 1896 treaty signed with the Shoshone and Arapaho Indian tribes.

== Geography ==
Thermopolis is located near the northern end of the Wind River Canyon and Wedding of the Waters, where the north-flowing Wind River becomes the Bighorn River, an instance of a river changing names at a point other than a confluence of two streams. The dual name is ascribed to the mountain barrier between the Wind River and Bighorn basins, obscuring the fact that the river that drains the two is the same. The term "Wedding of the Waters" dates to at least 1934, when a marker was placed at the location.

Thermopolis is ringed by mountains, with the Big Horn Mountains to the northeast, the Bridger Mountains to the southeast, the Owl Creek Mountains to the southwest and the Absaroka Range to the northwest. Thermopolis is the southernmost municipality in the Bighorn Basin.

Roundtop Mountain, on the northern edge of town, is a geological formation shaped much like a volcano. It sits at approximately 6,000 feet (1,800 m) above sea level and is the highest area in the immediate vicinity of Thermopolis.

According to the United States Census Bureau, the town has a total area of 2.47 square miles (6.40 km^{2}), of which 2.38 square miles (6.16 km^{2}) is land and 0.09 square miles (0.23 km^{2}) is water.

=== Climate ===
According to the Köppen Climate Classification system, Thermopolis has a cool semi-arid climate, abbreviated BSk on climate maps. The hottest temperature recorded in Thermopolis was 109 °F (42.8 °C) on July 12, 2026, while the coldest temperature recorded was −44 °F (−42.2 °C) on January 16, 1930.

Climate data for Thermopolis, Wyoming, 1991–2020 normals, extremes 1899–present
Month	Jan	Feb	Mar	Apr	May	Jun	Jul	Aug	Sep	Oct	Nov	Dec	Year
Record high °F (°C)	67 (19)	71 (22)	84 (29)	89 (32)	98 (37)	105 (41)	109 (43)	106 (41)	104 (40)	92 (33)	77 (25)	78 (26)	109 (43)
Mean maximum °F (°C)	53.9 (12.2)	57.4 (14.1)	70.3 (21.3)	79.6 (26.4)	87.8 (31.0)	95.9 (35.5)	100.6 (38.1)	98.6 (37.0)	93.9 (34.4)	82.6 (28.1)	67.6 (19.8)	55.9 (13.3)	101.1 (38.4)
Mean daily maximum °F (°C)	37.3 (2.9)	41.6 (5.3)	54.0 (12.2)	61.9 (16.6)	71.4 (21.9)	82.9 (28.3)	91.8 (33.2)	89.8 (32.1)	79.7 (26.5)	64.5 (18.1)	48.6 (9.2)	37.5 (3.1)	63.4 (17.5)
Daily mean °F (°C)	24.4 (−4.2)	28.6 (−1.9)	39.8 (4.3)	47.6 (8.7)	57.0 (13.9)	66.8 (19.3)	74.5 (23.6)	72.4 (22.4)	62.7 (17.1)	49.1 (9.5)	35.1 (1.7)	24.9 (−3.9)	48.6 (9.2)
Mean daily minimum °F (°C)	11.5 (−11.4)	15.6 (−9.1)	25.6 (−3.6)	33.4 (0.8)	42.5 (5.8)	50.6 (10.3)	57.1 (13.9)	55.0 (12.8)	45.7 (7.6)	33.8 (1.0)	21.7 (−5.7)	12.3 (−10.9)	33.7 (1.0)
Mean minimum °F (°C)	−10.9 (−23.8)	−6.7 (−21.5)	7.2 (−13.8)	18.9 (−7.3)	29.5 (−1.4)	39.4 (4.1)	48.5 (9.2)	45.1 (7.3)	32.8 (0.4)	16.5 (−8.6)	0.6 (−17.4)	−9.1 (−22.8)	−17.0 (−27.2)
Record low °F (°C)	−44 (−42)	−42 (−41)	−28 (−33)	−6 (−21)	12 (−11)	24 (−4)	34 (1)	23 (−5)	7 (−14)	−11 (−24)	−28 (−33)	−38 (−39)	−44 (−42)
Average precipitation inches (mm)	0.39 (9.9)	0.44 (11)	0.85 (22)	1.63 (41)	2.53 (64)	1.31 (33)	0.76 (19)	0.50 (13)	1.21 (31)	1.27 (32)	0.60 (15)	0.46 (12)	11.95 (302.9)
Average snowfall inches (cm)	5.4 (14)	4.9 (12)	2.3 (5.8)	2.2 (5.6)	0.2 (0.51)	0.0 (0.0)	0.0 (0.0)	0.0 (0.0)	0.3 (0.76)	2.1 (5.3)	5.5 (14)	4.5 (11)	27.4 (68.97)
Average precipitation days (≥ 0.01 in)	3.0	3.6	4.1	6.5	7.8	7.2	5.1	4.4	5.2	4.9	3.9	3.2	58.9
Average snowy days (≥ 0.1 in)	2.6	2.8	1.6	0.9	0.1	0.0	0.0	0.0	0.1	0.7	2.0	2.5	13.3
Source 1: NOAA
Source 2: National Weather Service

== Demographics ==
Historical population
Census	Pop.	Note	%±
1900	299		—
1910	1,524		409.7%
1920	2,005		31.6%
1930	2,129		6.2%
1940	2,422		13.8%
1950	2,870		18.5%
1960	3,955		37.8%
1970	3,063		−22.6%
1980	3,852		25.8%
1990	3,247		−15.7%
2000	3,172		−2.3%
2010	3,009		−5.1%
2020	2,725		−9.4%
2023 (est.)	2,742	▲	0.6%
U.S. Decennial Census

=== 2020 census ===
As of the 2020 census, Thermopolis had a population of 2,725. The median age was 47.0 years. 20.9% of residents were under the age of 18 and 27.0% of residents were 65 years of age or older. For every 100 females there were 100.4 males, and for every 100 females age 18 and over there were 95.9 males age 18 and over.

0.0% of residents lived in urban areas, while 100.0% lived in rural areas.

There were 1,209 households in Thermopolis, of which 23.7% had children under the age of 18 living in them. Of all households, 41.9% were married-couple households, 23.5% were households with a male householder and no spouse or partner present, and 28.6% were households with a female householder and no spouse or partner present. About 38.3% of all households were made up of individuals and 19.8% had someone living alone who was 65 years of age or older.

There were 1,525 housing units, of which 20.7% were vacant. The homeowner vacancy rate was 5.5% and the rental vacancy rate was 24.0%.

Racial composition as of the 2020 census
Race	Number	Percent
White	2,503	91.9%
Black or African American	11	0.4%
American Indian and Alaska Native	29	1.1%
Asian	14	0.5%
Native Hawaiian and Other Pacific Islander	0	0.0%
Some other race	21	0.8%
Two or more races	147	5.4%
Hispanic or Latino (of any race)	112	4.1%

=== 2010 census ===
As of the census of 2010, there were 3,009 people, 1,389 households, and 818 families residing in the town. The population density was 1,264.3 inhabitants per square mile (488.1/km^{2}). There were 1,583 housing units at an average density of 665.1 per square mile (256.8/km^{2}). The racial makeup of the town was 96.4% White, 0.3% African American, 0.9% Native American, 0.5% Asian, 0.4% from other races, and 1.5% from two or more races. Hispanic or Latino of any race were 2.2% of the population.

There were 1,389 households, of which 24.0% had children under the age of 18 living with them, 44.3% were married couples living together, 10.4% had a female householder with no husband present, 4.1% had a male householder with no wife present, and 41.1% were non-families. 35.8% of all households were made up of individuals, and 14.8% had someone living alone who was 65 years of age or older. The average household size was 2.11 and the average family size was 2.70.

The median age in the town was 47 years. 20.1% of residents were under the age of 18; 7.2% were between the ages of 18 and 24; 20.2% were from 25 to 44; 30.5% were from 45 to 64; and 22.1% were 65 years of age or older. The gender makeup of the town was 49.1% male and 50.9% female.

=== 2000 census ===
As of the census of 2000, there were 3,172 people, 1,342 households, and 849 families residing in the town. The population density was 1,331.0 people per square mile (514.6/km^{2}). There were 1,568 housing units at an average density of 657.9 per square mile (254.4/km^{2}). The racial makeup of the town was 95.90% White, 0.47% African American, 1.70% Native American, 0.25% Asian, 0.50% from other races, and 1.17% from two or more races. Hispanic or Latino of any race were 2.30% of the population.

There were 1,342 households, out of which 26.8% had children under the age of 18 living with them, 52.0% were married couples living together, 8.9% had a female householder with no husband present, and 36.7% were non-families. 32.1% of all households were made up of individuals, and 13.9% had someone living alone who was 65 years of age or older. The average household size was 2.26 and the average family size was 2.86.

In the town, the population was spread out, with 22.5% under the age of 18, 6.4% from 18 to 24, 23.2% from 25 to 44, 26.9% from 45 to 64, and 21.0% who were 65 years of age or older. The median age was 44 years. Gender makeup for this period was 47.2% male and 52.8% female.

The median income for a household in the town was $29,205, and the median income for a family was $38,448. Males had a median income of $26,824 versus $18,438 for females. The per capita income for the town was $16,648. About 8.3% of families and 10.1% of the population were below the poverty line, including 11.3% of those under age 18 and 6.5% of those age 65 or over.

== Economy ==
=== Tourism ===
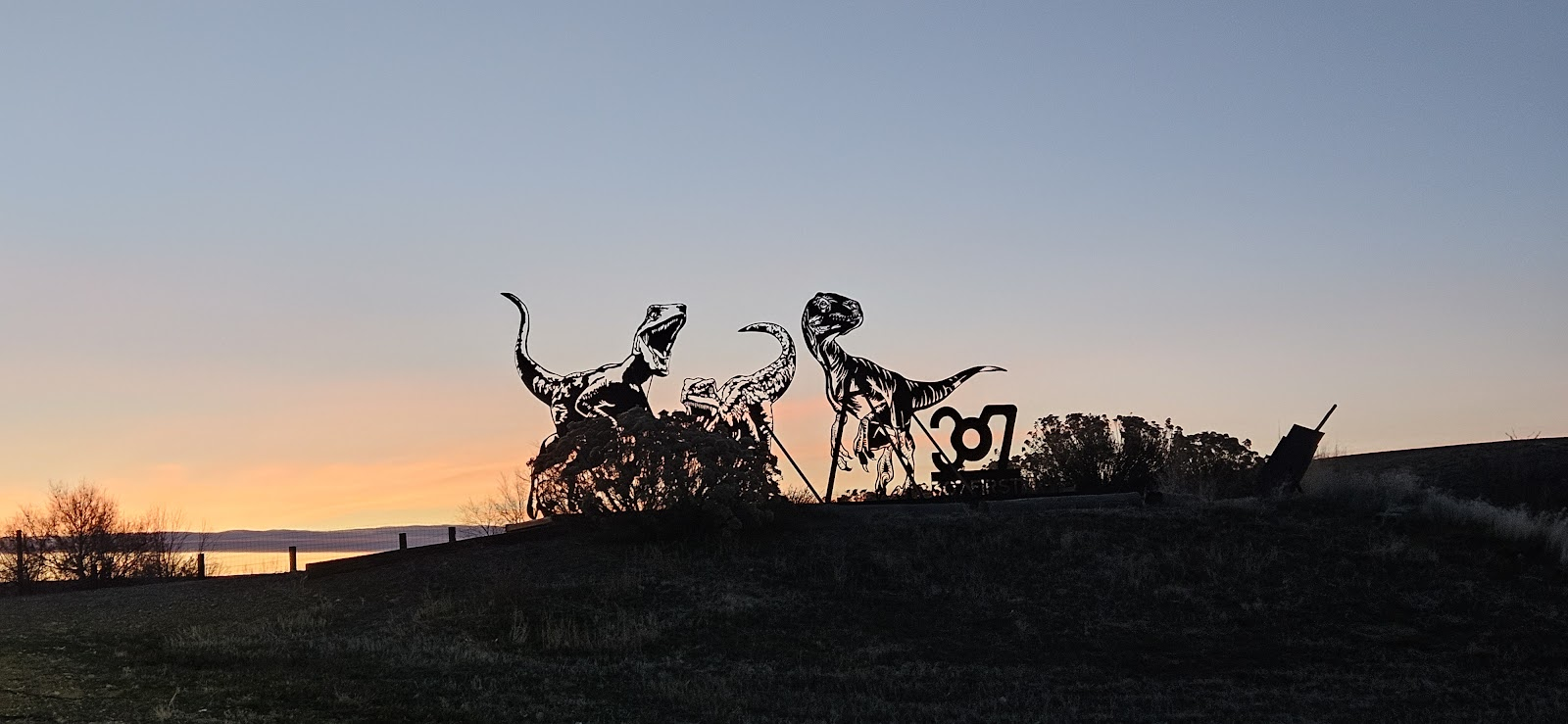
Raptor display at the Wyoming Dinosaur Center in East Thermopolis.

Hot Springs State Park extends into the town, and tourism is of economic importance to Thermopolis. A state maintained herd of American bison reside in the park.

Downtown Thermopolis Historic District is located here.

Hot Springs County Museum and Cultural Center features memorabilia from local pioneers from 1890 through 1910.

The Wyoming Dinosaur Center was founded by Burkhard Pohl in 1990.

The annual 3-on-3 Hot Spot Shootout Basketball Tournament was founded in 1993. Up to 60 temporary basketball courts are constructed on city streets in the downtown area.

== Education ==
Public education in the town of Thermopolis is provided by Hot Springs County School District #1 It is the only school district in the county. HSCSD1 includes Ralph Witters Elementary School, Thermopolis Middle School, Hot Springs County High School, and a building for the county auditorium and district administrative offices, all in Thermopolis. Lucerne Intermediate School, a facility for fourth and fifth graders located in Lucerne, closed in 2005. Fourth and fifth graders now attend the recently expanded Ralph Witters Elementary in Thermopolis.

== Media ==
The Thermopolis Independent Record, a weekly newspaper, has been published since 1901 and has a circulation of 1,800. Classic country station KDNO and Wyoming Public Media classical music affiliate KUWT both broadcast from Thermopolis.

== Infrastructure ==
=== Health care ===
Hot Springs County Memorial Hospital is a full-service hospital located in Thermopolis. It is a 25-bed Critical Access Hospital.

=== Transportation ===
==== Highways ====
- U.S. Route 20
- Wyoming Highway 120
- Wyoming Highway 789

==== Transit ====
Intercity bus service to the city is provided by Express Arrow.

==== Airport ====
Thermopolis is served by the Hot Springs County–Thermopolis Municipal Airport near Grass Creek, Wyoming.

== Notable people ==
- Wyatt Agar, a Republican member of the Wyoming Senate (2017–2021)
- Don Bracken (1962–2014), American football punter
- Clayton Danks (1879–1970), Three-time Cheyenne Frontier Days winner
- Mike Enzi (1944–2021), United States Senator from Wyoming (1997–2021)
- Dave Freudenthal (born 1950), governor of Wyoming (2003–2011)
- Steve Freudenthal (born 1949), the 28th Attorney General of Wyoming
- W. Michael Gear, a writer and archaeologist
- Kathleen O'Neal Gear, a writer and archaeologist
- Morris H. Hansen, a statistician who was born in Thermopolis
- Dora McGrath, the first woman elected to the Wyoming State Senate
- Moe Radovich, basketball player and college coach
- John Rankine (1923-1996), politician
- Barton R. Voigt, former Chief Justice of the Wyoming Supreme Court
- John Winter, Republican member of the Wyoming House of Representatives
- Nathan Winters, former Republican member of the Wyoming House of Representatives
