= U.S. Route 16 =

U.S. Highway in Wyoming and South Dakota

U.S. Route 16
- US 16 highlighted in red

Route information
- Length: 489.51 mi (Note: Mileage is a summation of each state's length) (787.79 km) 418.874 mi (674.112 km) in Wyoming; 70.64 mi (113.68 km) in South Dakota
- Existed: 1926–present

Major junctions
- West end: US 14 / US 20 at Yellowstone National Park entrance
- US 310 / WYO 789 near Greybull, WY; US 14A in Cody, WY; I-25 / US 87 in Buffalo, WY; I-90 / US 14 in Gillette, WY and Moorcroft, WY; US 85 in Newcastle, WY; US 16 Truck in Rapid City, SD
- East end: I-90 / I-190 / US 14 / US 16 Truck in Rapid City, SD

Location
- Country: United States
- States: Wyoming, South Dakota

Highway system
- United States Numbered Highway System; List; Special; Divided
← US 15	US	→ US 17
← WYO 14	WY	→ US 18
← SD 15	SD	→ SD 16

U.S. Highway 16 (US 16) is an east–west United States Numbered Highway between Rapid City, South Dakota, and Yellowstone National Park in Wyoming. The highway's eastern terminus is at a junction with Interstate 90 (I-90)/US 14, concurrent with I-190, in Rapid City. The western terminus is the east entrance to Yellowstone National Park, concurrent with US 14 and US 20. US 16 used to extend all the way to Michigan but has been truncated in favor of I-90 and I-96.

== Route description ==
Lengths
	mi	km
WY	419	674
SD	71	114
Total	490	790

=== Wyoming ===
US 16 begins at the east entrance to Yellowstone National Park, along with US 14 and the eastern segment of US 20. From the park, the three highways run concurrently to Cody and Greybull. In Greybull, US 14 splits off to the east, while US 16/US 20 heads due south to Basin and Worland. In Worland, US 16 splits off from US 20 and heads east over Powder River Pass on its way to the city of Buffalo. After passing Buffalo, US 16 arches north to the community of Ucross, meeting US 14 again, before arching back south to Gillette. US 16 then runs east concurrently with I-90 between Gillette and Moorcroft before heading southeast to the towns of Upton and Newcastle. The highway then heads east to the South Dakota state line. For most of the way through the state, the highway is a two-lane road. US 16 is 419 miles (674 km) long in Wyoming.

=== South Dakota ===
US 16 is also known as Mount Rushmore Road in western South Dakota. From the state line, the highway travels near Jewel Cave, the fifth longest cave in the world. The highway goes through the city of Custer and shares alignment with US 385. East of Hill City, US 16 splits off US 385. It then becomes a four-lane divided highway, with the two roadways separated by up to a half-mile (0.80 km) in some places, including the old gold-mining town of Rockerville, which is contained entirely between the two roadways. In Rapid City, a truck bypass runs along Catron Boulevard and Elk Vale Road up to exit 61 on I-90. US 16 is 71 miles (114 km) long in South Dakota.

The South Dakota section of US 16 is defined at South Dakota Codified Laws § 31-4-138.

== History ==
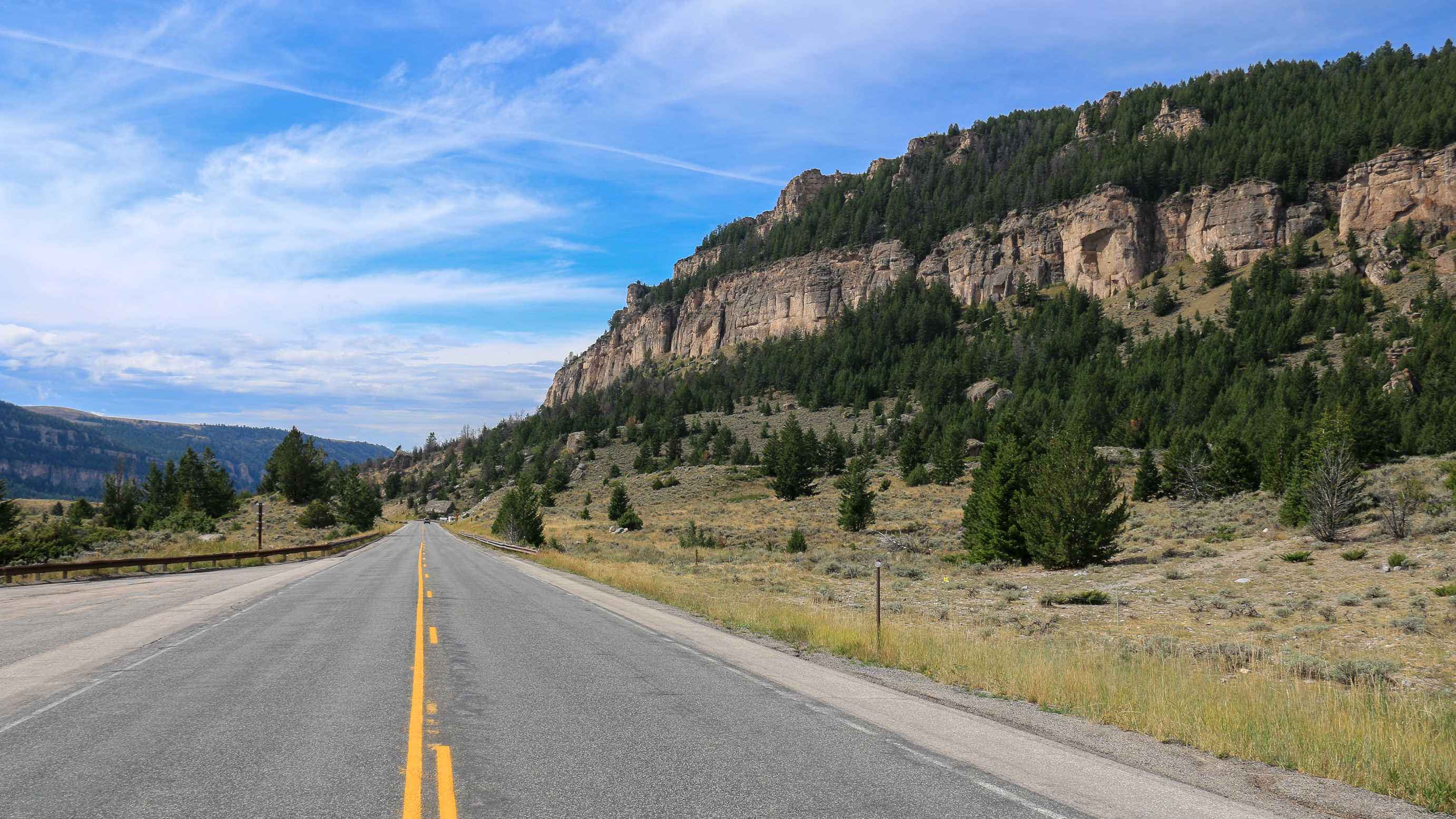
US 16 in the Tensleep Canyon, Bighorn Mountains, Wyoming

US 16 originally connected Detroit with Yellowstone National Park, including a ferry link across Lake Michigan between Muskegon, Michigan, and Milwaukee, Wisconsin aboard SS Milwaukee Clipper. In Michigan, the route was in use long before automobiles and was known to white settlers as the Grand River Road, and prior to the designation of U.S. Highways in 1926, had been designated as M-16 in the 1920s from Detroit to south of Muskegon. In 1938, reflectorized discs were placed on US 16 every 100 feet (30 m) from Detroit to Lansing, resulting in fewer nighttime traffic accidents. Other states would later do the same on their roads.

US 16 initially crossed the South Dakota–Wyoming state line west of Spearfish. U.S. Highway 216 (US 216) was commissioned in 1930 as a loop off US 16 to the south between Rapid City and Moorcroft, crossing the state line west of Custer. In 1934, US 16 was moved to the US 216 alignment, while the former US 16 became part of an extension of US 14.

In Michigan, most of US 16 was superseded by I-96 and a segment of Grand River Avenue in Detroit ultimately became M-5. US 16 was later decommissioned in Wisconsin, Minnesota, and eastern South Dakota to its present termini.

Between Rapid City and Dexter, Minnesota, it has been supplanted by I-90. In Faribault County, Minnesota, the highway took on another number as there was already a county highway numbered 16. Residents of the county continued referring to the road as "16" or "old 16" and eventually the county renumbered it as County Road 16 (CR 16). From the county's western border with Martin County, US 16 continued east through the city of Blue Earth as part of 1st Street and Leland Parkway until it briefly combines with US 169/Grove Street. One-half mile (0.80 km) south of that point at the intersection of Grove and 7th streets, CR 16 followed 7th Street and continued east to the border of Freeborn County. Most of the stretch through Faribault County was a relatively narrow two-lane highway with wide gravel shoulders that has been widened at least two times since US 16 was decommissioned. East of Dexter, it is now Minnesota State Highway 16 and State Trunk Highway 16 in Wisconsin. In South Dakota, it was replaced by various state highways (including South Dakota Highway 38, or SD 38, and SD 248) and county roads: generally, in West River, the old alignment was transferred to county responsibility entirely, while, in East River, it remained a state-maintained highway.

An older US 16A in South Dakota has become SD 240.

In South Dakota in 2009, the South Dakota Department of Transportation designated US 16/US 385 between Custer and Hill City, which passes by the Crazy Horse Memorial, now being carved in the Black Hills, as the Crazy Horse Memorial Highway. This segment of US 385 is also a part of the George Hearst Memorial Highway.

== Major intersections ==
Mileage resets at the state line crossing.

State	County	Location	mi	km	Exit	Destinations	Notes
Wyoming	Park	Yellowstone National Park	0.000	0.000		East Entrance Road (to US 20 west)	Continuation into Yellowstone National Park; US 20 resumes in Montana at the park's west entrance (closed winters)
Wyoming	Park	Yellowstone National Park	0.000	0.000	Yellowstone National Park boundary (East Entrance); fees required		
Wyoming	Park	Yellowstone National Park	0.000	0.000		US 14 begins / US 20 begins / Buffalo Bill Cody Scenic Byway begins	US 14 / US 16 western terminus; western end of US 14 / US 20 / Buffalo Bill Cody Scenic Byway concurrency
Wyoming	Park	Pahaska Tepee	2.000	3.219	Westbound road closure gate (closed winters)		
Wyoming	Park	Cody	49.410	79.518		WYO 291 south (South Fork Road)	
Wyoming	Park	Cody	50.900	81.916		US 14A east / WYO 120 west (16th Street) / Buffalo Bill Cody Scenic Byway ends – Powell, Big Horn Natl Rec Area	West end of WYO 120 and Buffalo Bill Cody Scenic Byway concurrency
Wyoming	Park	Cody	54.119	87.096		WYO 120 south – Meeteetse, Thermopolis	East end of WYO 120 concurrency
Wyoming	Big Horn		85.065	136.899		WYO 30 south – Burlington	
Wyoming	Big Horn	Emblem	85.665	137.864		WYO 32 north – Powell, Lovell	
Wyoming	Big Horn		99.197	159.642		US 310 west / WYO 789 north – Lovell, Billings, Bighorn Canyon Natl Recreation Area	West end of WYO 789 concurrency; US 310 eastern terminus
Wyoming	Big Horn		101.530	163.397		Airport Rest Area	
Wyoming	Big Horn	Greybull	104.176	167.655		US 14 east (Greybull Avenue) – Shell, Sheridan	East end of US 14 concurrency
Wyoming	Big Horn		108.960	175.354		WYO 36 south (Golf Course Road)	
Wyoming	Big Horn	Basin	111.815	179.949		WYO 30 south (C Street) – Burlington	
Wyoming	Big Horn		122.265	196.766		WYO 433 south	
Wyoming	Big Horn	Manderson	122.832	197.679		WYO 31 Spur east – Manderson, Hyattville	Officially WYO 31 Spur; signed as WYO 31
Wyoming	Big Horn	Manderson	123.436	198.651		WYO 31 east	Unsigned
Wyoming	Washakie	Worland	142.079	228.654		US 20 west / WYO 789 south (Big Horn Avenue) – Thermopolis, Hot Springs State Park	East end of US 20 / WYO 789 concurrency
Wyoming	Washakie	Ten Sleep	168.500	271.174		WYO 434 south – Big Trails	
Wyoming	Washakie		172.117	276.995		WYO 436 south	
Wyoming	Washakie		175.978	283.209		WYO 435 east	
Wyoming	Washakie		176.079	283.372		Eastbound road closure gate (weather depending)	
Wyoming	Washakie		191.489	308.172		Eastbound road closure gate (weather depending)	
Wyoming	Johnson		197.500	317.845		Powder River Pass	
Wyoming	Johnson		205.566	330.826		Westbound road closure gate (weather depending)	
Wyoming	Johnson		230.069	370.260		Westbound road closure gate (weather depending)	
Wyoming	Johnson	Buffalo	233.988	376.567		I-25 BL south / US 87 Bus. south (Main Street) – Casper	South end of I-25 BL / US 87 Bus. concurrency
Wyoming	Johnson	Buffalo	234.395	377.222		I-25 BL north / I-90 BL west (Main Street) / US 87 Bus. north	North end of I-25 BL / US 87 Bus. concurrency; south end of I-90 BL concurrency
Wyoming	Johnson	Buffalo	234.990	378.180		I-25 / US 87 – Sheridan, Casper	I-25 exit 299
Wyoming	Johnson		236.517	380.637		I-90 / I-90 BL ends – Sheridan, Gillette	I-90 exit 58; east end I-90 BL concurrency
Wyoming	Johnson		236.695	380.924		Eastbound road closure gate (weather depending)	
Wyoming	Sheridan	Ucross	252.255	405.965		US 14 west – Sheridan	West end of US 14 concurrency
Wyoming	Sheridan		279.196	449.322		WYO 341 south – Arvada	
Wyoming	Campbell		319.685	514.483		Eastbound road closure gate (weather depending)	
Wyoming	Campbell		322.648	519.252		WYO 59 north – Broadus	West end of WYO 59 concurrency
Wyoming	Campbell	Gillette	329.930	530.971		WYO 50 south / I-90 BL west (Skyline Drive) to I-90 – Buffalo, Moorcroft	West end of BL 90 concurrency
Wyoming	Campbell	Gillette	331.731	533.869		WYO 59 south to I-90 – Douglas	East end of WYO 59 concurrency
Wyoming	Campbell	Gillette	333.053	535.997	128	I-90 west / I-90 BL ends / WYO 51 east – Buffalo	East end of BL 90 concurrency; west end of I-90 concurrency; exit numbers follow I-90
Wyoming	Campbell	Gillette	334.586	538.464	129	Garner Lake Road	
Wyoming	Campbell		338.473	544.719	132	Wyodak Road	
Wyoming	Campbell		346.806	558.130	141	Rozet	
Wyoming	Crook	Moorcroft	358.981	577.724	153	I-90 east / I-90 BL begins – Sundance	East end of I-90 concurrency; west end of BL 90 concurrency
Wyoming	Crook	Moorcroft	359.118	577.944		WYO 51 west	
Wyoming	Crook	Moorcroft	360.186	579.663		US 14 east – Devils Tower, Hulett, Pine Haven	East end of US 14 concurrency
Wyoming	Crook	Moorcroft	360.384	579.982		I-90 BL east to I-90	East end of BL 90 concurrency
Wyoming	Crook		360.686	580.468		Eastbound road closure gate (weather depending)	
Wyoming	Weston	Upton	380.013	611.572		WYO 116 north – Sundance	West end of WYO 116 concurrency
Wyoming	Weston	Upton	380.317	612.061		WYO 116 south	East end of WYO 116 concurrency
Wyoming	Weston		380.986	613.138		Upton Rest Area	
Wyoming	Weston	Osage	393.479	633.243		WYO 451 west (Oil City Road)	
Wyoming	Weston		405.786	653.049		Westbound road closure gate (weather depending)	
Wyoming	Weston		405.452	652.512		WYO 450 west	
Wyoming	Weston	Newcastle	407.127	655.207		US 16 Byp. east	
Wyoming	Weston	Newcastle	408.955	658.149		US 16 Byp. west	
Wyoming	Weston	Newcastle	409.606	659.197		US 85 – Sundance, Lusk	
Wyoming	Weston		413.790	665.930		Eastbound road closure gate (weather depending)	
			418.874 0.00	674.112 0.00	Wyoming–South Dakota state line		
South Dakota	Custer	Custer	26.46	42.58		US 385 south / SD 89 south – Wind Cave National Park, Hot Springs	West end of US 385 / SD 89 concurrency
South Dakota	Custer	Custer	26.96	43.39		US 16A east / SD 89 north – Custer State Park	East end of SD 89 concurrency
South Dakota	Pennington		37.49	60.33		SD 87 south (Needles Highway) / Peter Norbeck Scenic Byway – Sylvan Lake, Custer	
South Dakota	Pennington		37.69	60.66		SD 244 east / Peter Norbeck Scenic Byway – Mount Rushmore	
South Dakota	Pennington	Hill City	40.51	65.19		US 16 Truck east / US 385 Truck north	
South Dakota	Pennington	Hill City	41.06	66.08		US 16 Truck west / US 385 Truck south	
South Dakota	Pennington	Three Forks	45.00	72.42		US 385 north – Deadwood, Lead	East end of US 385 concurrency
South Dakota	Pennington	Keystone Wye	50.60	81.43		US 16A west – Keystone, Mount Rushmore	Directional-T interchange
South Dakota	Pennington		55.42– 56.19	89.19– 90.43		Rockerville	Interchange; left exits and entrances
South Dakota	Pennington	Rapid City	64.19	103.30		US 16 Truck east to I-90 / Catron Boulevard	Future single-point urban interchange (SPUI)
South Dakota	Pennington	Rapid City	68.77– 68.85	110.67– 110.80		I-90 BL (St. Joseph Street / Main Street)	One way pair
South Dakota	Pennington	Rapid City	68.98	111.01		SD 44 east (Omaha Street)	West end of SD 44 concurrency
South Dakota	Pennington	Rapid City	69.20	111.37		SD 44 east (Omaha Street) I-190 begins / West Boulevard	East end of SD 44 concurrency; west end of I-190 concurrency; I-190 southern terminus; exit numbers follow I-190
South Dakota	Pennington	Rapid City	69.57	111.96	1C	North Street – Civic Center	
South Dakota	Pennington	Rapid City	70.64	113.68	1A–1B	I-90 / I-190 ends / US 14 / SD 79 – Gillette, Sioux Falls	Trumpet interchange; US 16 eastern terminus; I-190 northern terminus; east end of I-190 concurrency; signed as exits 1A (west) and 1B (east); I-90 exit 57
1.000 mi = 1.609 km; 1.000 km = 0.621 mi: Concurrency terminus; Tolled; Route transition

== See also ==
=== Related routes ===
- U.S. Route 116
- U.S. Route 216

=== Special and suffixed routes ===
- U.S. Route 16A in South Dakota
- Special routes of U.S. Route 16
