= Wyoming Highway 31 =

State highway in Big Horn County, Wyoming, United States

Wyoming Highway 31
- Cold Springs Road
- WYO 31 highlighted in red

Route information
- Maintained by WYDOT
- Length: 22.086 mi (35.544 km)

Major junctions
- West end: US 16 / US 20 / WYO 789 in Manderson
- East end: CR R49 in Hyattville

Location
- Country: United States
- State: Wyoming
- Counties: Big Horn

Highway system
- Wyoming State Highway System; Interstate; US; State
← WYO 30	→ WYO 32

Wyoming Highway 31 (WYO 31), also known as Cold Springs Road) is a 22.086-mile (35.544 km) state highway in Big Horn County, Wyoming, United States, that connects U.S. Route 16 / U.S. Route 20 / Wyoming Highway 789 (US 16 / US 20 / WYO 789) in Manderson with County Road R49 (CR R49) in Hyattville.

== Route description ==
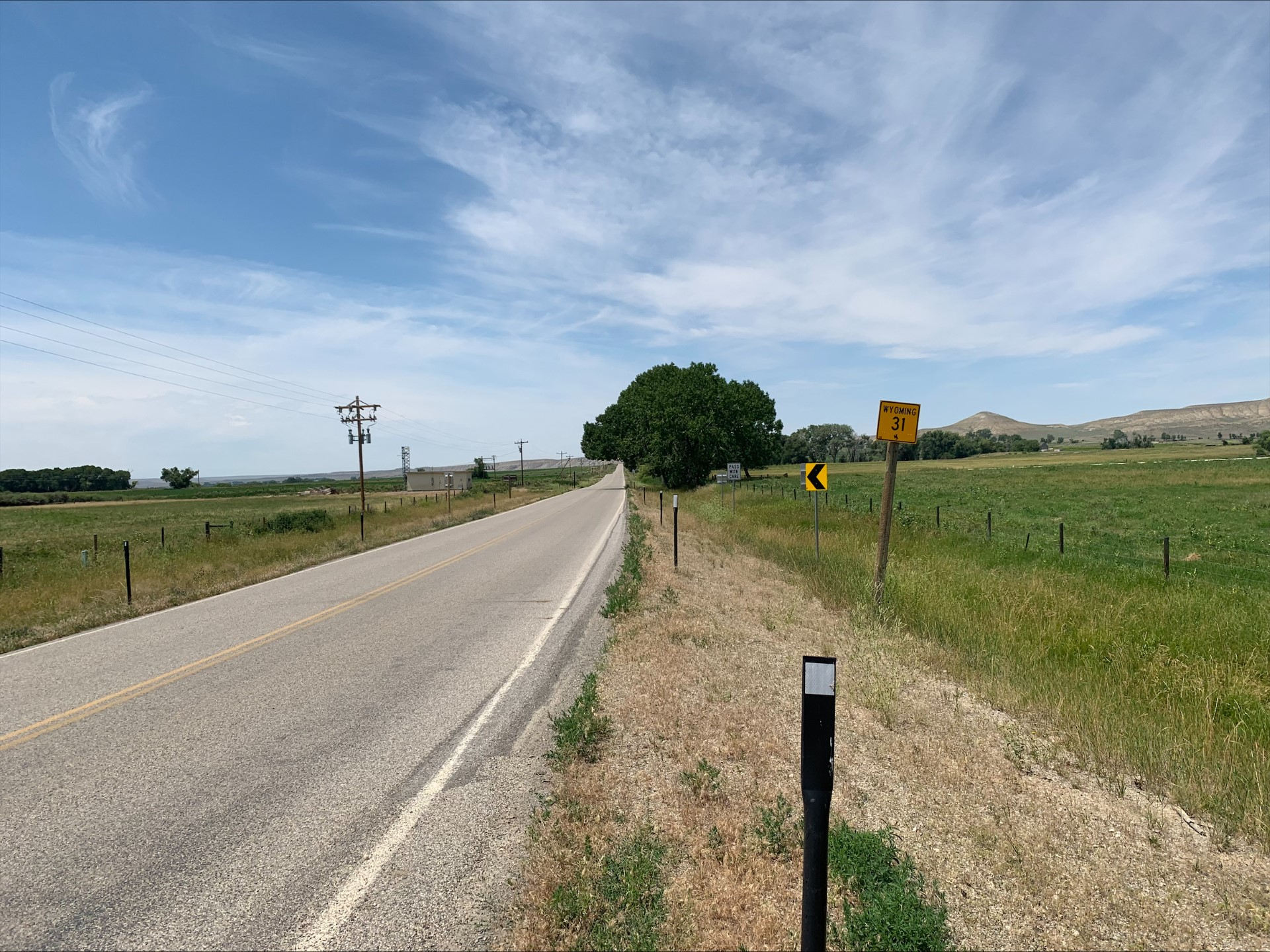
WYO 31 heading west out of Hyattville, July 2024

WYO 31 is an east–west highway that starts in the town of Manderson at US 16 / US 20 / WYO 789 and heads north through Manderson as Sherman and Marshall Streets, but turns east as it leaves the town to head toward Hyattville. Nearing its end, WYO 31 turns south and enters the census-designated place of Hyattville and passes through the community as Main Street. The WYO 31 designation ends south of Hyattville. The roadway continues as CR R49.

Medicine Lodge State Archaeological Site in Hyattville can be reached by using WYO 31.

== Major intersections ==
The entire route is in Big Horn County.

Location	mi	km	Destinations	Notes
Manderson	0.000	0.000	US 16 / US 20 / WYO 789 – Worland, Basin	Western terminus; T intersection
Manderson	0.424	0.682	WYO 31 Spur west	
Hyattville	22.086	35.544	CR R49 south	Eastern terminus; CR R49 continues south from eastern terminus
1.000 mi = 1.609 km; 1.000 km = 0.621 mi

== Wyoming Highway 31 Spur ==
Wyoming Highway 31 Spur
- Location: Manderson
- Length: 0.31 mi (500 m)

Wyoming Highway 31 Spur (WYO 31 Spur) is an unsigned 0.31-mile (0.5 km) long spur route of WYO 31 in Manderson. WYO 31 Spur travels from WYO 31 west to US 16 / US 20 / WYO 789.

== See also ==
- List of state highways in Wyoming
