= Wyoming Highway 789 =

State highway in Wyoming, United States

Wyoming Highway 789
- Canada to Mexico Highway
- WYO 789 highlighted in red

Route information
- Maintained by WYDOT
- Length: 407.613 mi (655.990 km)

Major junctions
- South end: SH 13 at Colorado state line near Baggs
- I-80 / US 30 from Creston Junction to Rawlins; US 287 from Rawlins to Lander; US 26 from Riverton to Shoshoni; US 20 from Shoshoni to Greybull; US 16 from Worland to Greybull; US 14 / US 310 in Greybull; US 14A in Lovell
- North end: US 310 at the Montana state line north of Frannie

Location
- Country: United States
- State: Wyoming
- Counties: Carbon, Sweetwater, Natrona, Fremont, Hot Springs, Washakie, Big Horn

Highway system
- Wyoming State Highway System; Interstate; US; State
← WYO 585	→ WYO 10
← US 87	→ US 89

Wyoming Highway 789 (WYO 789) is a 407-mile-long (655 km) state highway in the U.S. state of Wyoming. WYO 789 travels south-to-north from the Colorado state line to the Montana state line. For most of its length, it is concurrent with other routes. It was the path of a formerly-proposed U.S. Route 789 that was canceled.

== Route description ==
WYO 789 begins at the Colorado state line just south of Baggs. It travels north for about 4 miles (6.4 km) to Baggs. After Baggs, it continues north for about 45 miles (72 km) until it reaches the county line.

After crossing the county line, WYO 789 travels north for about 6 miles (9.7 km) where it reaches exit 187 of I-80/US 30. WYO 789 joins I-80/US 30 eastbound.

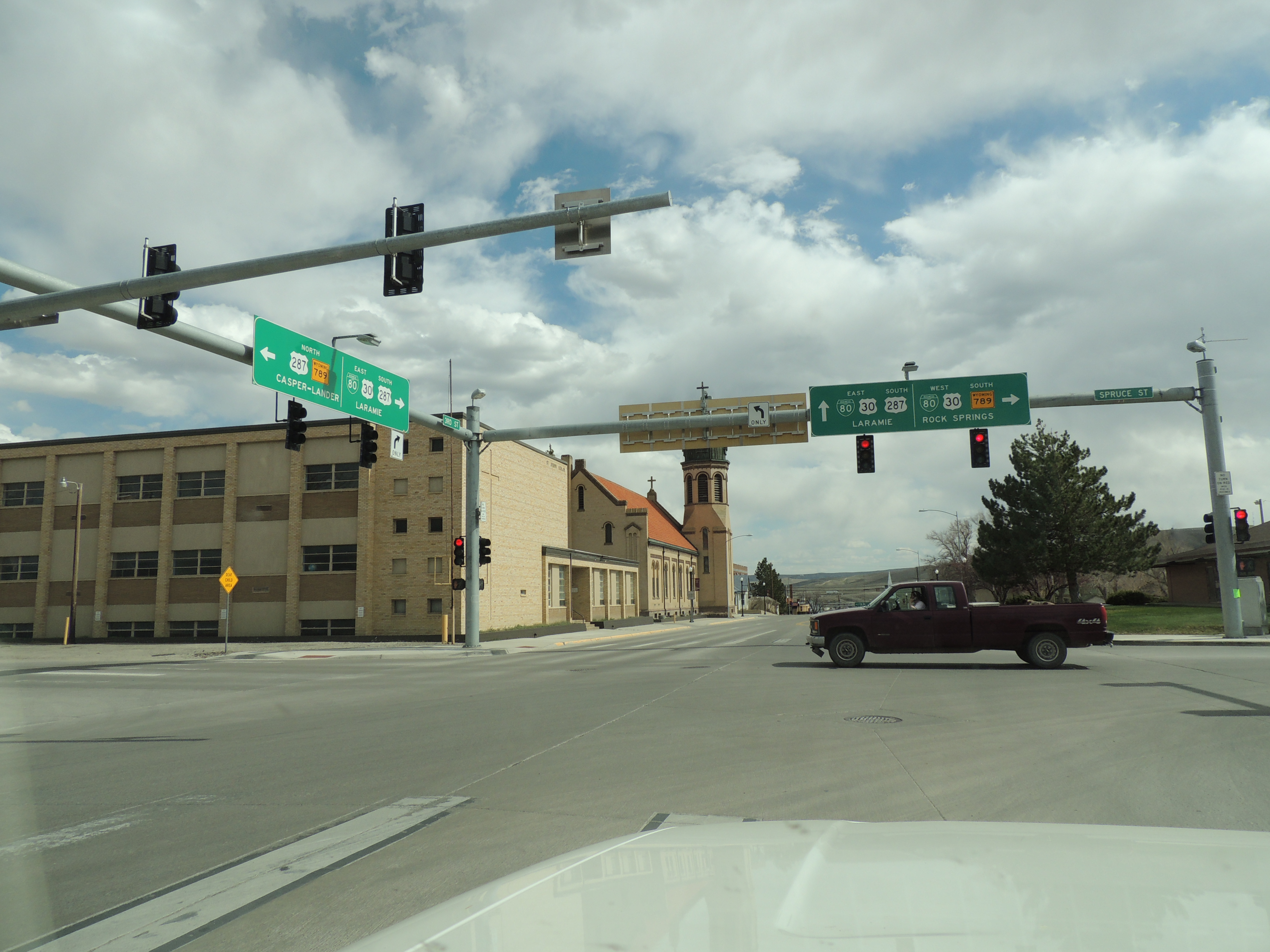
WYO 789 in Rawlins, May 2014

I-80/US 30/WYO 789 re-enter Carbon County. Just west of Rawlins, WYO 789 leaves at exit 211, joining I-80 Bus./US 30 Bus. through Rawlins. North of town, WYO 789 intersects US 287 and travels concurrent with it north for 50 miles (80 km) to the county line, after which it passes through Natrona County for about 2 miles (3.2 km).

US 287/WYO 789 continue in a northwest direction, passing through the towns of Jeffrey City and Sweetwater Station. About 40 miles (64 km) from Sweetwater Station, US 287/WYO 789 enter Lander. WYO 789 splits from US 287 here and continues northeast for 24 miles (39 km), alone, to Riverton. WYO 789 joins US 26 until they reach Shoshoni. Here, US 26/WYO 789 intersect US 20 where WYO 789 continues north with US 20 west.

US 20/WYO 789 continue through the Wind River Canyon into Thermopolis. From there, the highway veers off in a northeasterly direction into Washakie County. From the Washakie county line, the highway travels approximately 21 miles (34 km) before crossing the Big Horn River into Worland where it joins US 16/US 20.

Upon crossing into Big Horn County, US 16/US 20/WYO 789 veer back to the northwest and cross back over the Big Horn River after reaching Manderson. It continues on 20 miles (32 km) to the north through Basin and Greybull. Upon reaching Greybull, US 16/US 20/WYO 789 head west and join US 14 for about 5 miles (8.0 km).

At that point, WYO 789 separates from the concurrency of US 14/US 16/US 20 and returns to its northern path along with US 310 for about 28 miles (45 km) to the town of Lovell. For about 3 miles (4.8 km), US 310/WYO 789 travels west along US 14 Alt. US 310/WYO 789 then turn north for about 3 miles (4.8 km) to Cowley and then head west about 7 miles (11 km) to Deaver.

From Deaver, US 310/WYO 789 travel about 6 miles (9.7 km) north to Frannie, where they straddle the boundary between Big Horn County and Park County. Just to the north of Frannie, US 310/WYO 789 bends slightly to the west, so that the road is actually inside Park County by about 400 feet before reaching the Montana state line. At the state line, WYO 789 ends, while US 310 continues north.

== History ==
U.S. Route 789
- Location: Nogales, Arizona, to Sweet Grass, Montana
- Existed: November 20, 1950–October 14, 1952

WYO 789 was part of a 1950s proposal for a border-to-border U.S. Route 789 that would have traveled from Nogales, Arizona, to Sweet Grass, Montana. After the US 789 proposal was rejected by AASHTO on October 14, 1952, US 789 became part of a series of state highways numbered 789 traveling along the proposed route. Wyoming, however, was the only state that actually applied the number exclusively to existing highways (but only in some sections), whereas the other states simply added a concurrent SR 789 over existing highways. Because of this, all the states except Wyoming eventually deleted the designation and removed the signs.

A car collision occurred in 2011 when a 2002 Chevrolet suburban crashed into a 2005 Dodge caravan, killing five people. It was later revealed the driver of the Chevrolet, 17-year-old Matthew Denton, had deliberately driven his car into traffic going 97mph. It was later ruled a murder-suicide.

== Major intersections ==
County	Location	mi	km	Destinations	Notes
Carbon		0.000	0.000	SH 13 south – Craig, Meeker, Rifle	Continuation into Colorado
Carbon	Baggs	2.525	4.064	WYO 70 east – Dixon	
Sweetwater	Creston Junction	53.249	85.696	I-80 west / US 30 west – Rock Springs	Southern end of I-80 / US 30 concurrency; I-80 exit 187
See I-80 (exits 187-211)
Carbon	Rawlins	77.916	125.394	I-80 east / US 30 east / I-80 BL begins / US 30 Bus. begins – Cheyenne	Northern end of I-80 / US 30 concurrency; southern end of I-80 BL / US 30 Bus. concurrency; I-80 exit 211
Carbon	Rawlins	77.916	125.394	US 287 south / I-80 BL east / US 30 Bus. east (3rd Street) / Spruce Street – Laramie	Northern end of I-80 BL / US 30 Bus. concurrency; southern end of US 287 concurrency
Carbon	Rawlins	79.553	128.028	US 287 Byp. south (Hingley Boulevard)	Southern end of Chief Washakie Trail
Carbon		112.620	181.244	WYO 73 west – Bairoil	
Carbon		123.667	199.023	WYO 220 east / California National Historic Trail / Mormon Pioneer National Historic Trail / Oregon National Historic Trail / Pony Express National Historic Trail – Casper	
Natrona	No major junctions				
Fremont		165.773	266.786	WYO 135 north – Riverton	
Fremont		165.773	266.786	Sweetwater Station Rest Area	
Fremont		195.535	314.683	WYO 28 west / California National Historic Trail / Mormon Pioneer National Historic Trail / Oregon National Historic Trail / Pony Express National Historic Trail – Rock Springs	
Fremont	Lander	204.714	329.455	US 287 north / Chief Washakie Trail north – Dubois, Teton, Yellowstone, Sinks Canyon State Park	Northern end of US 287 concurrency
Fremont		216.348	348.178	Ethete Road – Arapahoe	Former WYO 138
Fremont	Arapahoe	227.778	366.573	Ethete Road / Sand Creek Massacre Trail west – Arapahoe	Former WYO 137
Fremont	Arapahoe	228.129	367.138	WYO 135 south to WYO 136 (Gas Hills Road) – Rawlins, Castle Gardens	
Fremont	Riverton	229.475	369.304	US 26 west (Main Street) – Dubois, Yellowstone, Teton	Southern end of US 26 concurrency
Fremont		243.059	391.166	WYO 134 west – Pavillion	
Fremont	Shoshoni	251.318	404.457	US 20 east / US 26 east (2nd Street east) / Sand Creek Massacre Trail east – Casper	Northern end of US 26 concurrency; southern end of US 20 concurency
Hot Springs		281.086	452.364	WYO 173 east (Buffalo Creek Road)	
Hot Springs	Thermopolis	283.730	456.619	WYO 120 north – Meeteetse, Cody, Wyoming Dinosaur Center	Access to Hot Springs Memorial Hospital
Hot Springs	Lucerne	291.012	468.338	WYO 172 east (Black Mountain Road)	
Hot Springs	Kirby	295.805	476.052	WYO 175 east – Kirby	
Washakie		307.855	495.445	WYO 431 west / WYO 432 east	
Washakie		315.822	508.266	WYO 433 north (West River Road)	
Washakie	Worland	316.484	509.332	To WYO 432 (Railroad Avenue)	
Washakie	Worland	316.808	509.853	US 16 east – Buffalo	Southern end of US 16 concurrency; access to Washakie Medical Center
Big Horn	Manderson	335.451	539.856	WYO 31 east	Unsigned
Big Horn	Manderson	336.055	540.828	WYO 31 Spur east – Manderson, Hyattville	Officially WYO 31 Spur; signed as WYO 31
Big Horn		336.622	541.741	WYO 433 south	
Big Horn	Basin	347.072	558.558	WYO 30 west (C Street) – Burlington	
Big Horn		349.927	563.153	WYO 36 south (Golf Course Road)	
Big Horn	Greybull	354.711	570.852	US 14 east / US 310 begins (Greybull Avenue) – Shell, Sheridan	US 310 eastern (southern) terminus; southern end of US 14 / US 310 concurrency; US 310 is unsigned
Big Horn		357.357	575.110	Airport Rest Area	
Big Horn		359.690	578.865	US 14 west / US 16 west / US 20 west – Cody, Yellowstone	Northern end of US 14 / US 16 / US 20 concurrency; US 310 becomes signed
Big Horn	Lovell	386.717	622.361	US 14A east – Burgess Junction	Southern end of US 14A concurrency
Big Horn		388.454	625.156	WYO 32 south – Emblem	
Big Horn		389.916	627.509	US 14A west – Byron, Powell, Cody	Northern end of US 14A concurrency
Big Horn	Cowley	393.844	633.830	WYO 35 south	
Big Horn	Deaver	399.824	643.454	WYO 114 south – Garland, Powell, Cody	
Big Horn–Park county line	Frannie	405.369	652.378		
Park		407.613	655.990	US 310 north – Bridger, Billings	Continuation into Montana; northern end of US 310 concurrency
1.000 mi = 1.609 km; 1.000 km = 0.621 mi: Concurrency terminus; Route transition
