= Wyoming Highway 434 =

State highway in Washakie County, Wyoming, United States

Wyoming Highway 434
- WYO 434 highlighted in red

Route information
- Maintained by WYDOT
- Length: 20.634 mi (33.207 km)

Major junctions
- South end: CR 82 in Big Trails
- North end: US 16 in Ten Sleep

Location
- Country: United States
- State: Wyoming
- Counties: Washakie

Highway system
- Wyoming State Highway System; Interstate; US; State
← WYO 433	→ WYO 435

Wyoming Highway 434 (WYO 434) is a 20.634-mile (33.207 km) state highway in Washakie County, Wyoming, United States. It connects County Road 82 (CR 83 / Upper Nowood Road) in Big Trails with U.S. Route 16 (US 16) in Ten Sleep.

== Route description ==
WYO 434 begins at the north end of CR 82 in an area called Big Trails in northeastern Washakie County, about 20 miles (32 km) south of Ten Sleep. (CR 82 heads southerly toward Lost Cabin and Moneta.) From its southern terminus, WYO 434 proceeds north as a two-lane road to the town of Ten Sleep, where it reaches its northern terminus at US 16 (2nd Street), just after crossing Tensleep Creek. (US 16 heads east toward Buffalo and Gillette and west toward Worland and Basin.)

== Major intersections ==
Actual mile markers increase from north to south.

The entire route is in Washakie County.

Location	mi	km	Destinations	Notes
Big Trails	0.000	0.000	CR 82 (Upper Nowood Rd) – Lost Cabin, Moneta	Continuation south of southern terminus
Big Trails	0.000	0.000	Southern terminus at cattle guard (about 600 feet [180 m] south of the Lost Canyon Creek bridge)	
Ten Sleep	20.354	32.757	Bridge over Tensleep Creek	
Ten Sleep	20.634	33.207	US 16 east (2nd St) – Buffalo, Gillette US 16 west (2nd St) – Worland, Basin	Northern terminus
Ten Sleep	20.634	33.207	Cottonwood St north – Hyattville	Continuation north of northern terminus
1.000 mi = 1.609 km; 1.000 km = 0.621 mi

== See also ==
- List of state highways in Wyoming
