= Wyoming Highway 30 =

State highway in Big Horn County, Wyoming, United States

Wyoming Highway 30
- Otto Road
- WYO 30 highlighted in red

Route information
- Maintained by WYDOT
- Length: 26.019 mi (41.874 km)

Major junctions
- West end: US 14 / US 16 / US 20 in Emblem
- East end: US 16 / US 20 / WYO 789 in Basin

Location
- Country: United States
- State: Wyoming
- Counties: Big Horn

Highway system
- Wyoming State Highway System; Interstate; US; State
← US 30	→ WYO 31

Wyoming Highway 30 (WYO 30), also known as Otto Road, is a 26.019-mile (41.874 km) state highway in Big Horn County, Wyoming, United States that connects U.S. Route 14 / U.S. Route 16 / U.S. Route 20 (US 14 / US 16 / US 20) in Emblem with US 16 / US 20 / Wyoming Highway 789 (WYO 789) in Burlington, via Otto.

== Route description ==
WYO 30 is mostly an east-west highway, but travels north-south at its west end. WYO 30 has its west end at US 14 / US 16 / US 20 in the unincorporated community of Emblem, just six-tenths of a mile west of Wyoming Highway 32's southern terminus. WYO 30 serves several small communities and ranches to the west of Worland and is an alternate to US 16/US 20 between Emblem and Basin. WYO 30 heads south reaching the town of Burlington at 3.79 miles. After leaving the town of Burlington, Highway 30 turns east to head toward Otto, reaching that community by 10.30 miles. WYO 30 continues east, to Basin intersecting Wyoming Highway 36 at its southern terminus. Shortly after, WYO 30 comes to its eastern end at US 16 / US 20 / WYO WYO 789 (4th Street).

Mileposts increase from east to west along Wyoming 30.

== Major intersections ==
The entire route is in Big Horn County.

Location	mi	km	Destinations	Notes
Emblem	0.000	0.000	US 14 east / US 16 east / US 20 east – Greybull, Basin, WYO 30 US 14 west / US 16 west / US 20 west – Cody, Yellowstone National Park	Western terminus; T intersection
	18.372	29.567	Bridge over the Greybull River	
Basin	25.649	41.278	WYO 36 north (Golf Course Rd) – US 16 / US 20 / WYO 789; 9th St south	Southern end of WYO 36
Basin	26.019	41.874	US 16 east / US 20 east / WYO 789 south (South 4th St) – Manderson, Worland US 16 west / US 20 west / WYO 789 north (North 4th St) – Greybull, WYO 30	Eastern terminus
Basin	26.019	41.874	C St east	Continuation east from eastern terminus
1.000 mi = 1.609 km; 1.000 km = 0.621 mi

== See also ==
- List of state highways in Wyoming
