= Charles Rose (architect) =

American architect (born 1960)

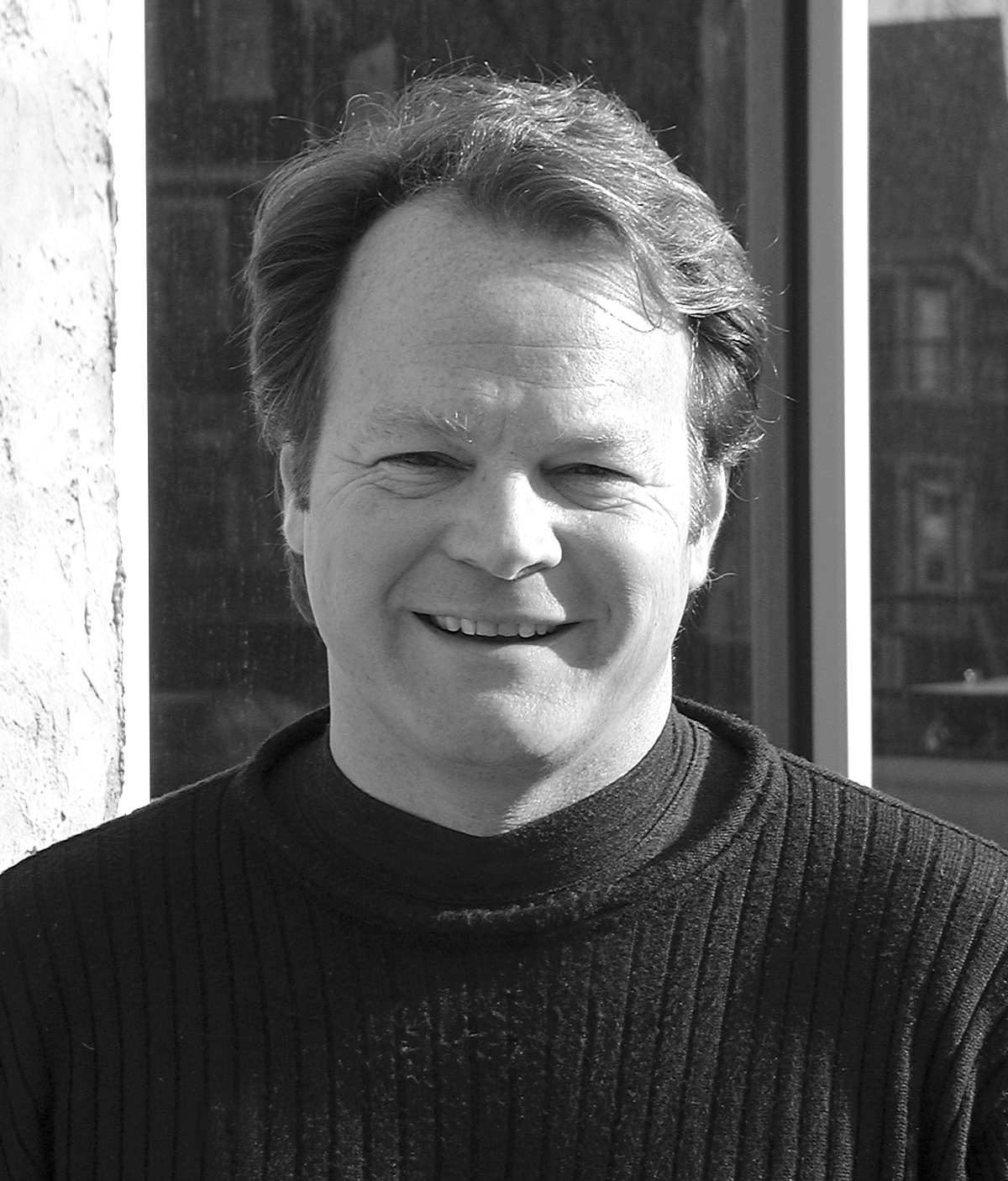
Rose in 2002

Charles Rose (born April 27, 1960) is an American architect. Disambiguation: There is a California architect also named Charlie Rose (December 28, 1932 - October 7, 2014), known for luxury homes in the Carmel, CA, area.

== Early and personal life ==
Rose was born on April 27, 1960 in New York City. His parents were Waldorf teachers in Garden City, Long Island. He has four siblings. He attended the Waldorf School of Garden City and studied piano at the Manhattan School of Music prior to college. He enrolled at Princeton University as a physics major but soon switched to architecture. He has lived in Boston since attending the Harvard Graduate School of Design, where he studied under Michael Graves and Rafael Moneo.

== Career ==
After leaving Harvard, Rose worked with landscape architect Michael Van Valkenburgh, an experience which influenced Rose's style. He established his practice in Boston in 1989 and in two decades completed more than 50 buildings. His architecture, influenced by his work with Valkenburgh, aims to be formally conscious of site and the buildings relationship to it. In 1997, he designed Leeper Studio Complex at the Atlantic Center for the Arts in New Smyrna Beach, Florida, and in 2000, he designed Camp Paint Rock in Hyattville, Wyoming. After completing Camp Paint Rock, Rose received several commissions, including a commercial project in 1997 for Gemini Consulting to design an "office of the future", the Gulf Coast Museum of Art in Largo, Florida (2001), the United States Port of Entry in Del Rio, Texas, and the Currier Center for the Performing Arts at The Putney School (2004).

Alongside buildings for academic, cultural and non-profit institutions, Rose has also designed private homes, including Orleans House on Cape Cod and Joshua Bell's Flatiron District penthouse (2010). Rose has also completed projects for state and federal government clients.

Rose has taught in the architecture programs at universities including the Massachusetts Institute of Technology, the University of Virginia, and Harvard and Rice universities. Rose also designs furniture; his Executive Mother and Child Desk was featured in Dwell magazine in 2006

=== Carbon-neutral or zero net energy consumption design ===
Rose's designs incorporate energy-efficient features, such as geothermal, planted roofs, and louver systems that increase natural lighting. Its most energy-efficient building – a brick-and-copper-clad 25,000-square-foot transit center in Greenfield, Ma. – is designed to produce as much energy as it uses by drawing on geothermal sources, a wood-chip boiler and photovoltaic array. The project, funded in part by the American Recovery and Reinvestment Act, is the state's first zero-net-energy transit center and will serve as an office, bus station, and train depot on the upgraded "Knowledge Corridor" rail line that goes from Connecticut through Massachusetts to Vermont.

== Selected works ==
- Leeper Studio Complex at the Atlantic Center for the Arts (New Smyrna Beach, Florida, 1997)
- Carl and Ruth Shapiro Admissions Center at Brandeis University (Waltham, Massachusetts, 2009)
- Bartholomew County Veterans Memorial (Columbus, Indiana, 1996)
- Beacom School of Business at The University of South Dakota (Vermillion, South Dakota, 2009)
- Camp Paint Rock (Hyattville, Wyoming, 2000)
- Carl and Ruth Shapiro Campus Center at Brandeis University (Waltham, Massachusetts, 2002)
- Chilmark Residence (Chilmark, Massachusetts, 2001)
- Executive Mother and Child Desk (2006)
- Franklin Regional Transit Center (Greenfield, Massachusetts, 2011)
- Gemini Consulting Global Offices (Cambridge, Massachusetts, 1997)
- Joshua Bell Loft (New York, New York, 2010)
- Orleans House (Orleans, Massachusetts, 2006)
- Theodore R. and Karen K. Muenster University Center at The University of South Dakota (Vermillion, South Dakota, 2009)

== Gallery ==
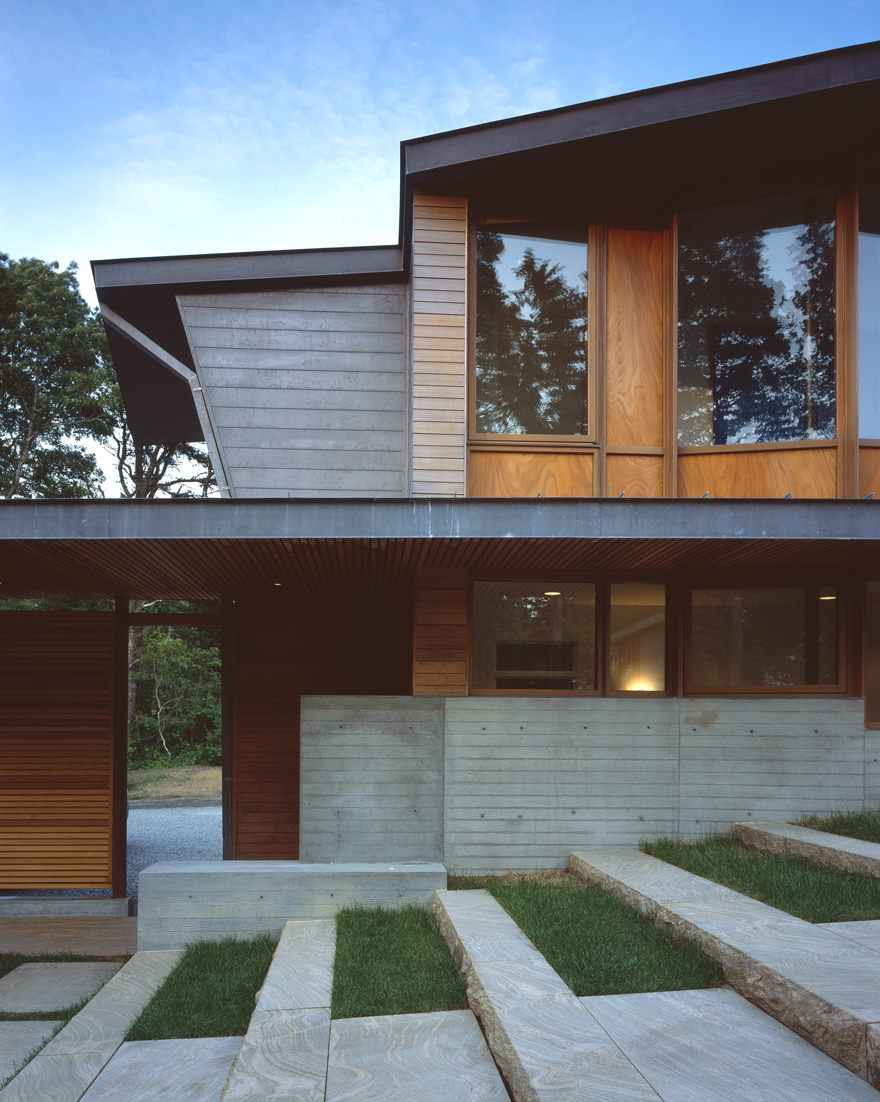
Orleans House, Orleans, Massachusetts

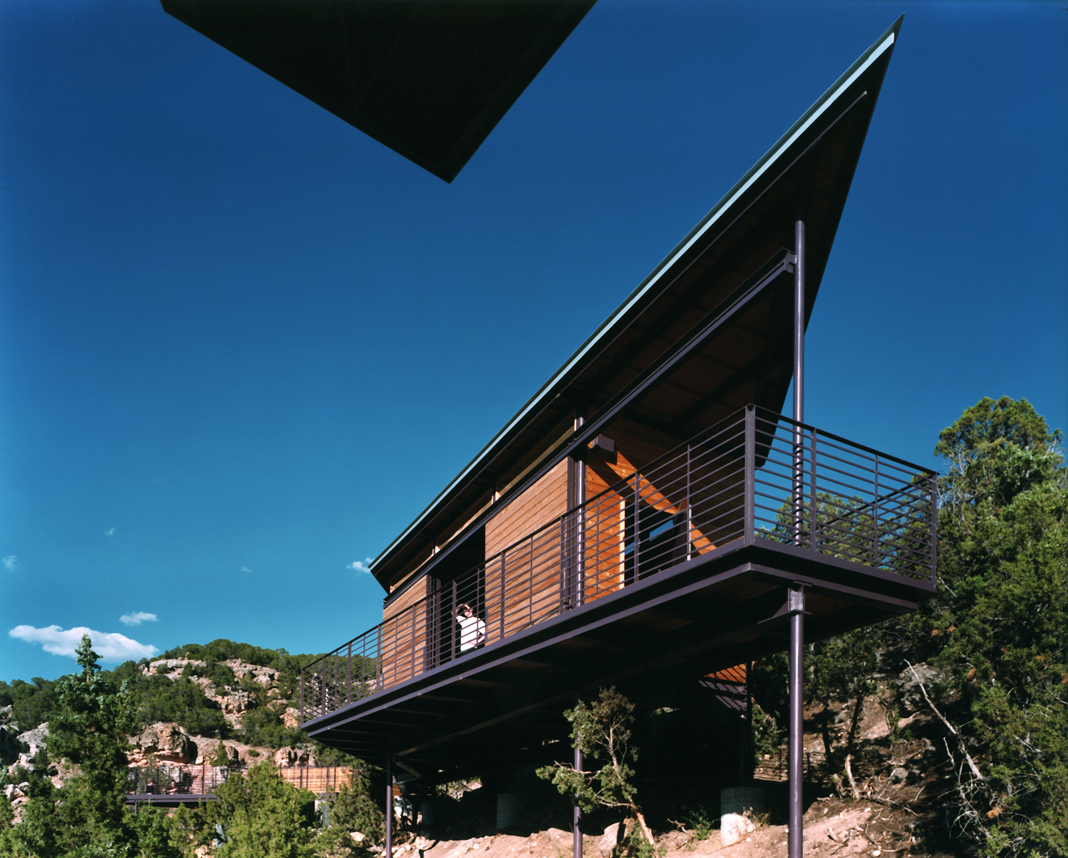
Camp Paint Rock, Hyattville, Wyoming

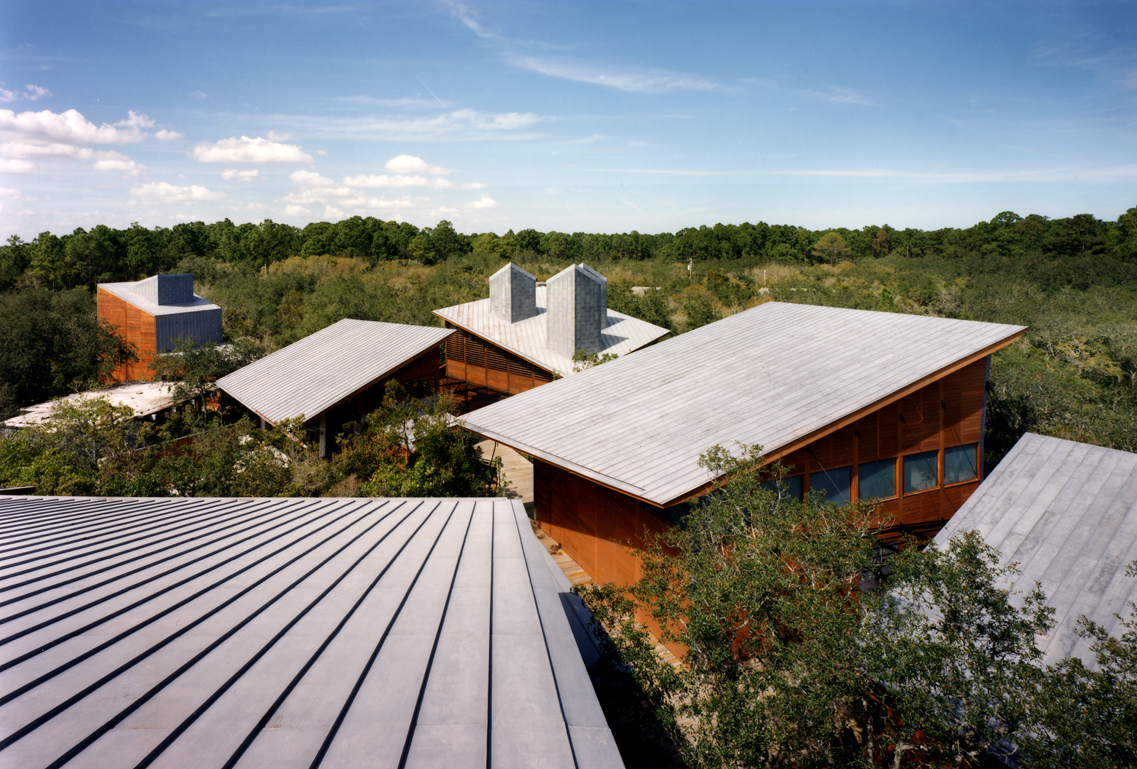
Leeper Studio Complex, New Smyrna Beach, Florida

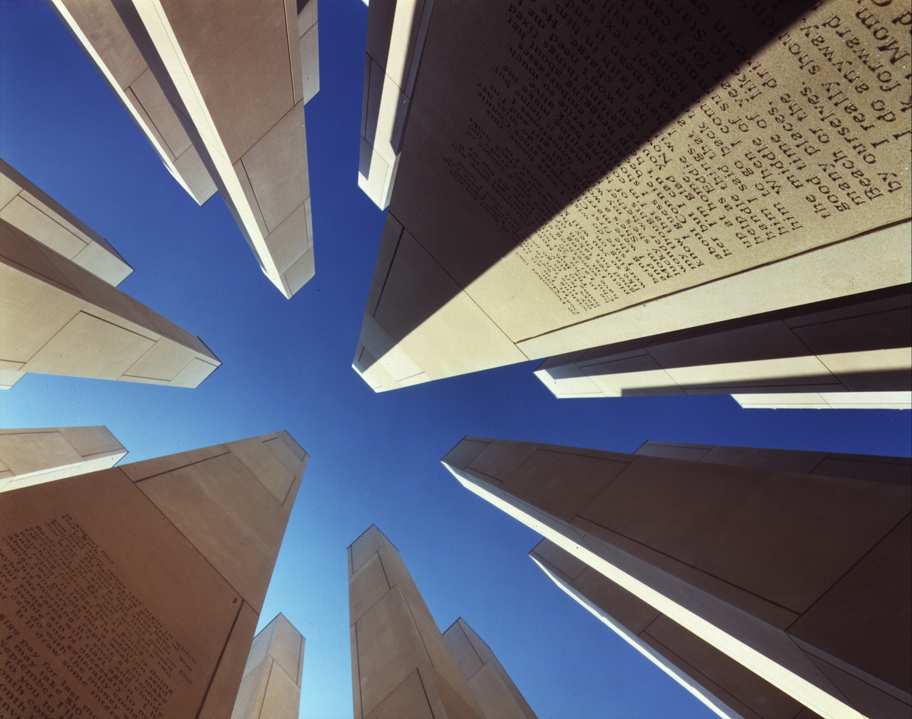
Bartholomew County Veterans Memorial,
Columbus, Indiana

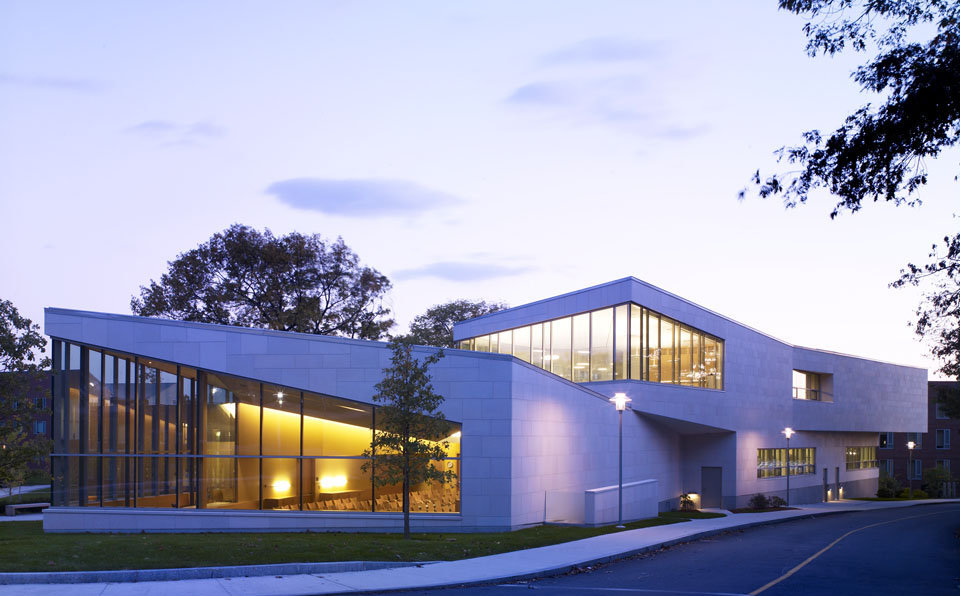
Brandeis University Admissions Center, Waltham, Massachusetts

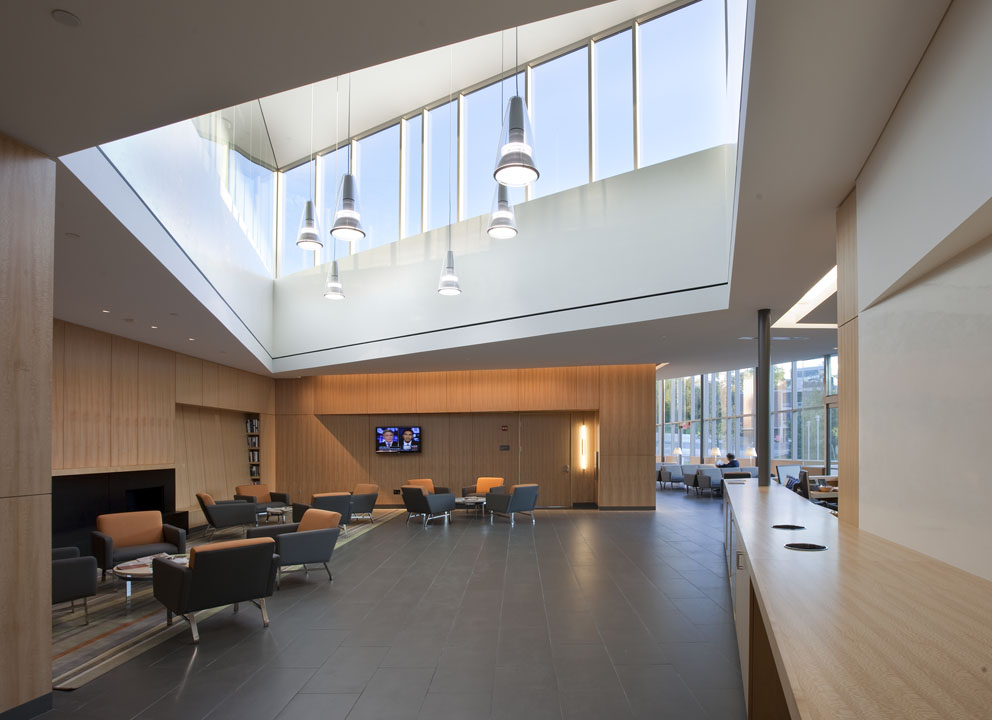
Brandeis University Admissions Center, Waltham, Massachusetts

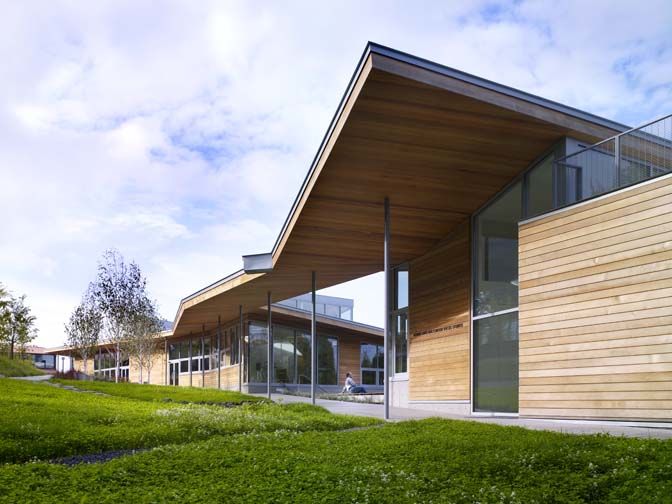
Jean Vollum Drawing, Painting, and Photography Building, Portland, Oregon

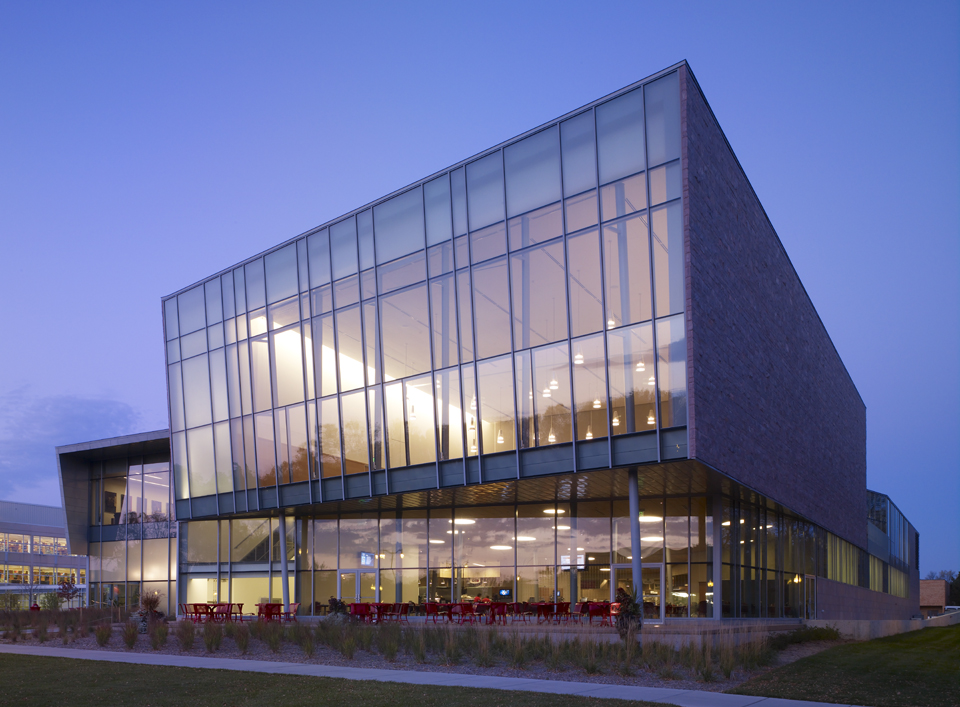
Theodore R. and Karen K. Muenster University Center, Vermillion, South Dakota

== Awards ==
As design principal of Boston-based Charles Rose Architects, Inc., Rose is the winner of awards from the American Institute of Architects and national competitions . In 1995, he won the competition for the Bartholomew County Veterans Memorial in Columbus, Indiana, in 2000, he won for the Beacom School of Business at The University of South Dakota in Vermillion, a contest that led to a commission to design the school's Theodore R. and Karen K. Muenster University Center. In 2012 construction was completed on the John Olver Transit Center in Greenfield, MA. The project was commissioned by the Federal Transit Administration and has won awards, including Boston Society of Architects Design Award and the ACEC 2013 Gold Award

- AIA New England Honor Award for Design Excellence for the New Shrub and Vine Collection of Arnold Arboretum, Harvard University (2010)
- American Architecture Award from the Chicago Athenaeum for the Orleans House, Orleans, MA (2007)
- AIA New England Award for Design Excellence for the Currier Center for the Performing Arts, Putney, VT (2005)
- Design Excellence Award from the U.S. General Services Administration for the United States Port of Entry, Del Rio, Texas (2004)
- American Architecture Award from the Chicago Athenaeum for the Carl and Ruth Shapiro Campus Center at Brandeis University, Waltham, MA (2004)
- American Architecture Award from the Chicago Athenaeum for Camp Paint Rock, Hyattville, Wyoming (2002)
- American Institute of Architects Connecticut Design Award for The Foote School, New Haven, CT (2002)
- American Institute of Architects New England Award for Design Excellence for Camp Paint Rock, Hyattville, Wyoming (2002)
- American Institute of Architects New England Award for Design Excellence for Chilmark House, Martha's Vineyard, MA (2002)
- American Institute of Architects New England Award for Design Excellence for Amphitheater and Bathhouse, Acton, MA (2002)
- American Wood Council National Honor Award for Camp Paint Rock, Hyattville, Wyoming (2002)
- I.D. Design Award for Camp Paint Rock, Hyattville, Wyoming (2002)
- American Institute of Architects New England Award for Design Excellence for Equipment Shed, San Juan Island, Washington (2002)
- American Institute of Architects New England Award for Design Excellence for the Gulf Coast Museum of Art, The Florida Botanical Gardens, Largo, FL (2001)
- American Institute of Architects Young Architect Citation (1998)
- American Institute of Architects New England Award for Design Excellence for the Atlantic Center for the Arts, New Smyrna Beach, Florida (1998)
- Tucker Award of Excellence from the Building Stone Institute for the Bartholomew County Veterans Memorial, Columbus, Indiana (1998)
- American Wood Council National Honor Award for Equipment Shed, San Juan Island, Washington (1997)
- AIA: Business Week/Architectural Record Business Design Award for Gemini Consulting Global Offices, Cambridge, MA (1997)
- I.D. Magazine Annual Design Review, Design Distinction Award for the Atlantic Center for the Arts, New Smyrna Beach, Florida (1997)
- American Wood Council National Honor Award for the Atlantic Center for the Arts, New Smyrna Beach, Florida (1995)
