= Wyoming Highway 433 =

State highway in Wyoming, United States

Wyoming Highway 433
- WYO 433 highlighted in red

Route information
- Maintained by WYDOT
- Length: 18.81 mi (30.27 km)

Major junctions
- South end: US 20 / WYO 789 in Worland
- North end: US 16 / US 20 / WYO 789 near Manderson

Location
- Country: United States
- State: Wyoming
- Counties: Washakie, Big Horn

Highway system
- Wyoming State Highway System; Interstate; US; State
← WYO 432	→ WYO 434

Wyoming Highway 433 (WYO 433) is an 18.81-mile-long (30.27 km) Wyoming state road in Washakie and Big Horn counties.

== Route description ==
Wyoming Highway 433 begins its southern end at US 20/WYO 789 on the west side of Worland in Washakie County. Here WYO 433 passes through a lightly built up section of Worland before crossing the Bighorn Canal and entering a more rural landscape which dominates for the remainder of its routing. Highway 433 travels north along the west side of the Bighorn River, closely following the Bighorn canal, and reaches the community (CDP) of West River at approximately 6 miles. Highway 433 also parallels US 16/US 20/WYO 789 that runs along the east side of the Bighorn River and acts as an alternate to that routing north to Manderson where it meets up with those routes. At approximately 10.9 miles, WYO 433 leaves Washakie County and enters Big Horn County. Highway 433 gently meanders north-northwest and reaches its northern end just west of Manderson at Highway 16/20/789 after 18.81 miles.

== Major intersections ==
County	Location	mi	km	Destinations	Notes
Washakie		0.00	0.00	US 20 / WYO 789	
Big Horn		18.81	30.27	US 16 / US 20 / WYO 789	
1.000 mi = 1.609 km; 1.000 km = 0.621 mi
