= Meadow Lark Lake, Wyoming =

Meadowlark Lake, Wyoming
- Census designated place
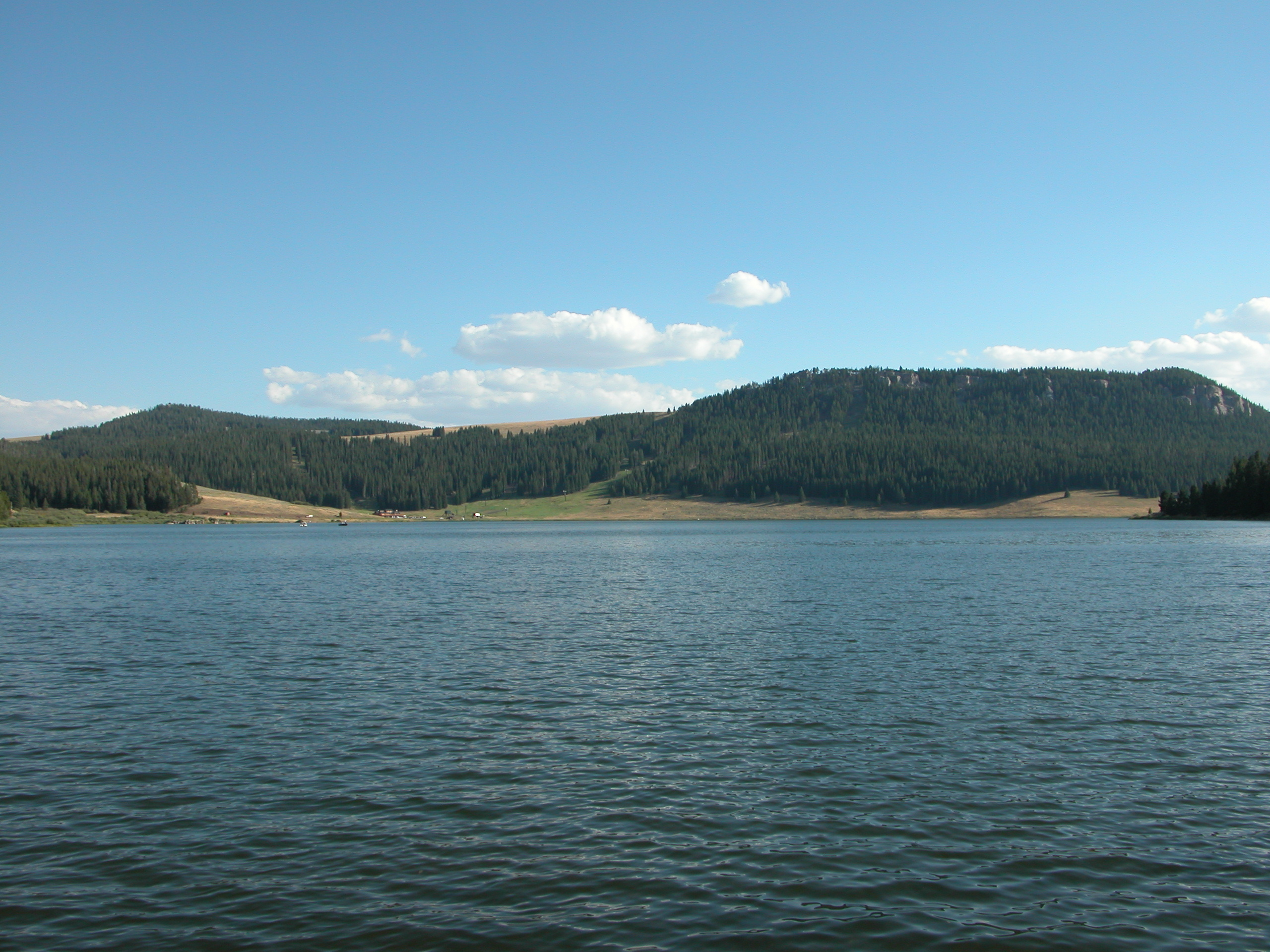
- View across Meadowlark Lake

- Location within the state of Wyoming Meadowlark Lake, Wyoming (the United States)
- Coordinates: 44°11′39″N 107°12′31″W
- Country: United States
- State: Wyoming
- County: Big Horn

Area
  - Total: 19.3 sq mi (50.0 km^{2})
  - Land: 19.0 sq mi (49.1 km^{2})
  - Water: 0.35 sq mi (0.9 km^{2})
- Elevation: 8,685 ft (2,647 m)

Population (2000)
  - Total: 8
  - Density: 0.52/sq mi (0.2/km^{2})
- Time zone: UTC-7 (Mountain (MST))
  - Summer (DST): UTC-6 (MDT)
- Area code: 307
- FIPS code: 56-51357
- GNIS feature ID: 2408808

Meadowlark Lake is a census-designated place in Big Horn County, Wyoming, United States. The population was 8 at the 2000 census.

== Geography ==
According to the United States Census Bureau, in 2000 the CDP has a total area of 19.3 square miles (50.0 km^{2}), of which, 19.0 square miles (49.1 km^{2}) is land and 0.3 square mile (0.9 km^{2}) (1.76%) is water.

== Demographics ==
As of the census of 2000, there were 8 people, 2 households, and 2 families residing in the CDP. The population density was 0.4 people per square mile (0.2/km^{2}). There were 46 housing units at an average density of 2.4/sq mi (0.9/km^{2}). The racial makeup of the CDP was 87.50% White, and 12.50% from two or more races.

There were 2 households, out of which none had children under the age of 18 living with them, 50.0% were married couples living together, and 0.0% were non-families. No households were made up of individuals, and none had someone living alone who was 65 years of age or older. The average household size was 4.00 and the average family size was 3.00.

In the CDP the population was spread out, with 62.5% from 18 to 24, 37.5% from 45 to 64, . The median age was 24 years. For every 100 females, there were 166.7 males. For every 100 females age 18 and over, there were 166.7 males.

The median income for a household in the CDP was $31,250, and the median income for a family was $31,250. Males had a median income of $0 versus $0 for females. The per capita income for the CDP was $17,167. None of the population or families were below the poverty line.

== Education ==
Public education in the community of Meadowlark Lake is provided by Big Horn County School District #4. The district has four campuses – Laura Irwin Elementary School (grades K-4), Manderson Elementary School (grade 5), Cloud Peak Middle School (grades 6–8), and Riverside High School (grades 9–12).
