= Wyoming Highway 36 =

State highway in Wyoming, United States

Wyoming Highway 36
- Golf Course Road
- WYO 36 highlighted in red

Route information
- Maintained by WYDOT
- Length: 2.76 mi (4.44 km)

Major junctions
- South end: WYO 30 in Basin
- North end: US 16 / US 20 / WYO 789 north of Basin

Location
- Country: United States
- State: Wyoming
- Counties: Big Horn

Highway system
- Wyoming State Highway System; Interstate; US; State
← WYO 35	→ WYO 37

Wyoming Highway 36 (WYO 36) is a 2.76-mile-long (4.44 km) north–south Wyoming state highway located in south-central Big Horn County and acts as a bypass west of Basin.

== Route description ==
Wyoming Highway 36 is a state highway in Basin. Known locally as Golf Course Road, WYO 36 travels from Wyoming Highway 30 in Basin, north, paralleling US 16/US 20/WYO 789 northwest of Basin, passes by Midway Golf Club and ends at US 16/US 20/WYO 789 north of Basin at 2.76 miles.

== Major intersections ==
The entire route is in Big Horn County.

Location	mi	km	Destinations	Notes
Basin	0.00	0.00	WYO 30	Southern terminus
	2.76	4.44	US 16 / US 20 / WYO 789	Northern terminus
1.000 mi = 1.609 km; 1.000 km = 0.621 mi
