= Big Horn County School District Number 4 =

School district in Wyoming, United States

Big Horn County School District #4 is a public school district based in Basin, Wyoming, United States.

== Geography ==
Big Horn County School District #4 serves southern Big Horn County and a very small, detached tract of land in northeastern Park County, including the following communities:

- Incorporated places
  - Town of Basin
  - Town of Manderson
- Census-designated places (Note: All census-designated places are unincorporated.)
  - Hyattville
  - Meadow Lark Lake

== Schools ==
- Riverside High School (Grades 9–12)
- Cloud Peak Middle School (Grades 6–8)
- Manderson Elementary School (Grades K-5)
- Laura Irwin Elementary School (Grades K-5)

== Student demographics ==
The following figures are as of October 1, 2009.

- Total District Enrollment: 297
- Student enrollment by gender
  - Male: 157 (52.86%)
  - Female: 140 (47.14%)
- Student enrollment by ethnicity
  - Asian: 1 (0.34%)
  - Black or African American: 1 (0.34%)
  - Hispanic or Latino: 31 (10.44%)
  - Two or More Races: 3 (1.01%)
  - White: 261 (87.88%)

== See also ==
- List of school districts in Wyoming
