= Wyoming Highway 436 =

State highway in Wyoming, United States

Wyoming Highway 436
- WYO 436 highlighted in red

Route information
- Maintained by WYDOT
- Length: 5.93 mi (9.54 km)

Major junctions
- South end: CR 56
- North end: US 16

Location
- Country: United States
- State: Wyoming
- Counties: Washakie

Highway system
- Wyoming State Highway System; Interstate; US; State
← WYO 435	→ WYO 450

Wyoming Highway 436 (WYO 436) is a 5.93-mile-long (9.54 km) Wyoming state road in located in northeastern Washakie county.

== Route description ==
Wyoming Highway 436 begins its southern end at Washakie CR 56. Highway 436 proceeds north for 5.93 miles until reaching its northern terminus at US Route 16, approximately 3.5 miles east of Ten Sleep.

== Major intersections ==
The entire route is in Washakie County.

Location	mi	km	Destinations	Notes
	0.00	0.00	CR 56	Southern terminus of WYO 436
	5.93	9.54	US 16	Northern terminus of WYO 436
1.000 mi = 1.609 km; 1.000 km = 0.621 mi
