= Big Trails, Wyoming =

Big Trails, Wyoming Bigtrails
- Place
- Location of Big Trails in Wyoming
- Coordinates: 43°46′28″N 107°18′59″W
- Country: United States
- State: Wyoming
- County: Washakie
- Elevation: 4,793 ft (1,461 m)
- Time zone: UTC-7 (MST)
  - Summer (DST): UTC-6 (MDT)

Big Trails is an unincorporated place in the eastern part of Washakie County in north-central Wyoming. Wyoming Highway 434 leads north 21 miles to Ten Sleep, and south over mountains to Lost Cabin, Lysite, and Moneta. Barnum and Mayoworth are the nearest places to the east across the Bighorn range.

== History ==
The Ainsworth House, built in 1886, is on the National Register of Historic Places.

== Geography ==
Big Trails lies in the Big Horn Basin on the northwest side of a mountain ridge. It is near the confluence of the eastern part of the Owl Creek Mountains and the southern part of the Bighorn Mountains. The southern Bighorns have a fault named Big Trails Fault and there is some seismic activity in the area. The place name "Nowood" is a local word that describes the Nowood Valley, Wyoming Highway 434 (the Nowood Road), and the Nowood River.
