= Wyoming Highway 35 =

State highway in Big Horn County, Wyoming, United States

Wyoming Highway 35
- Road 7
- WYO 35 highlighted in red

Route information
- Maintained by WYDOT
- Length: 1.076 mi (1.732 km)

Major junctions
- South end: CR R7 southwest of Cowley
- North end: US 310 / WYO 789 in Cowley

Location
- Country: United States
- State: Wyoming
- Counties: Big Horn

Highway system
- Wyoming State Highway System; Interstate; US; State
← WYO 34	→ WYO 36

Wyoming Highway 35 (WYO 35), also known as Road 7, is a 1.076-mile (1.732 km) north–south state highway in Big Horn County, Wyoming, United States. It connects County Road R7 (CR R7), southwest of Cowley with U.S. Route 310 / Wyoming Highway 789 (US 310 / WYO 789) and North 4th Street West on the western edge of Cowley.

== Route description ==
WYO 25 begins at the north end of CR R7, just north of the BNSF Railway tracks, southwest of Cowley. (CR R7 continues south to end at US 310 / WYO 789, west of Lovell.) From its southern terminus, WYO 35 proceeds north as a two-lane road to cross Sage Creek before running along the western border of Cowley. Just over one mile (1.6 km) along its route, WYO 35 reaches its northern terminus at an intersection with US 310 / WYO 789 and North 4th Street West. (US 310 / WYO 789 heads east through Cowley and then on toward Lovell and Greybull. US 310 / WYO 789 heads west toward Deaver and Frannie.)

== Major intersections ==
Actual mileposts along WYO 35 increase from north to south.

The entire route is in Big Horn County.

Location	mi	km	Destinations	Notes
	0.000	0.000	CR R7 south – US 310 / WYO 789	Southern terminus road continues south from southern terminus
	0.0361	0.0581	Bridge over Sage Creek	
Cowley	1.076	1.732	US 310 east / WYO 789 south (West Main St) – Lovell, Greybull US 310 west / WYO 789 north (West Main St) – Deaver, Frannie	Northern terminus
Cowley	1.076	1.732	North 4th St West north	Continuation north from northern terminus
1.000 mi = 1.609 km; 1.000 km = 0.621 mi: Route transition

== See also ==
- List of state highways in Wyoming
