= Wyoming Highway 432 =

State highway in Wyoming, United States

Wyoming Highway 432
- South Flat Road
- WYO 432 highlighted in red

Route information
- Maintained by WYDOT
- Length: 10.29 mi (16.56 km)

Major junctions
- South end: US 20 / WYO 789 / WYO 431
- North end: Railway Avenue at Worland city limits

Location
- Country: United States
- State: Wyoming
- Counties: Washakie

Highway system
- Wyoming State Highway System; Interstate; US; State
← WYO 431	→ WYO 433

Wyoming Highway 432 (WYO 432) is a 10.29-mile-long (16.56 km) Wyoming state road in Washakie County. WYO 432 is locally known as South Flat Road for the Census-designated place (CDP) of the same name that it passes through.

== Route description ==
Wyoming Highway 432 begins at US 20/WYO 789 and the eastern terminus of Wyoming Highway 431 approximately 8 miles southwest of Worland. Highway 432 heads east, crossing the Bighorn River before entering the CDP of South Flats from the west. Here WYO 432 turns north, and will follow the east bank of the Bighorn River north to Worland. Upon reaching the city limits of Worland, Highway 432 abruptly ends as Railway Avenue continues north into the city. US 20/WYO 789, which lies just under a mile north of here, can be reached via Railway Avenue, Culbertson Avenue and S. 5th Street. Signs stating "TO WYO 432" are posted on US 20/WYO 789 (Bighorn Avenue) and southbound along Culbertson Avenue and S. Railway Avenue.

== Major intersections ==
The entire route is in Washakie County.

Location	mi	km	Destinations	Notes
	0.00	0.00	WYO 431 west	Continuation beyond southern terminus; eastern terminus of WYO 431
	0.00	0.00	US 20 / WYO 789	
Worland	10.29	16.56	Railway Avenue	
1.000 mi = 1.609 km; 1.000 km = 0.621 mi
