= Ainsworth House (Big Trails, Wyoming) =

Historic house in Wyoming, United States

- U.S. National Register of Historic Places
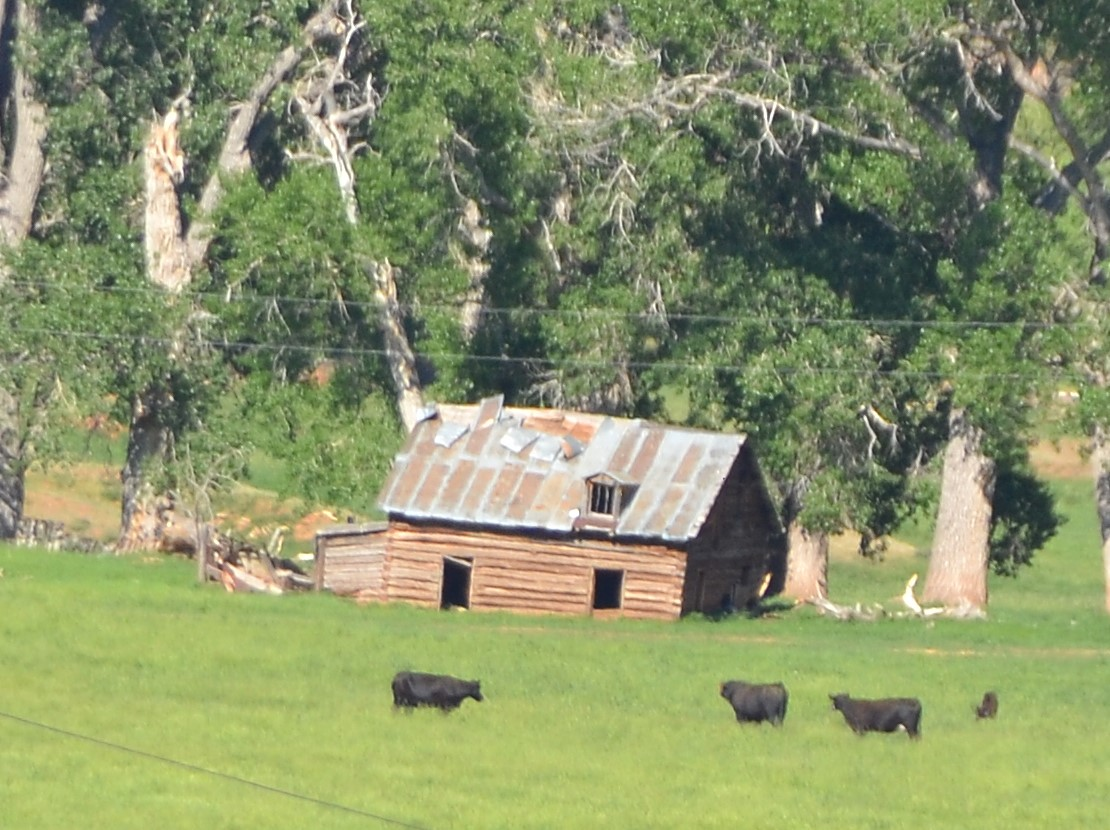

- Location within Wyoming Location within the United States
- Location: Spring Creek Rd., Big Trails, Wyoming
- Coordinates: 43°47′47″N 107°18′53″W
- Built: 1886
- Architect: Ainsworth, F.S.; Ainsworth, R.
- NRHP reference No.: 86002321
- Added to NRHP: September 11, 1986

The Ainsworth House, also known as the Greet Ranch, was built in 1886 by homesteader Frank S. Ainsworth and his wife in Big Trails, Wyoming, in the Nowood Valley of Washakie County. The Ainsworths built the frame house after living in a tent and a log dugout. The house was one of the first permanent habitations to be built in the Bighorn Basin.

The 1886 section of the house is a 1½ story framed and clapboarded building, to which was appended a 1½ story log house built in 1890 and expanded upward in 1911.

Ainsworth was born in Iowa in 1857. He went west to Denver, then hunted and trapped in northwestern Colorado. By 1879 he was trapping in the Bighorn Basin. In 1885 he returned to Iowa to marry Lucy Ann Albee and brought her back to the Bighorn Basin where they built their house. They subsisted by cultivating the native hay of the region, which allowed them to grow sufficient fodder to withstand the severe winters. Ainsworth also worked as a carpenter in the area.

The house was listed on the National Register of Historic Places in 1986.
