= Wyoming Highway 435 =

State highway in Wyoming, United States

Wyoming Highway 435
- Sand Draw Road
- WYO 435 highlighted in red

Route information
- Maintained by WYDOT
- Length: 0.78 mi (1,260 m)

Major junctions
- West end: US 16
- East end: Old Hwy. 16

Location
- Country: United States
- State: Wyoming
- Counties: Washakie

Highway system
- Wyoming State Highway System; Interstate; US; State
← WYO 434	→ WYO 436

Wyoming Highway 435 (WYO 435) is a short 0.78-mile-long (1.26 km) Wyoming state road in northeastern Washakie county that serves the Ten Sleep Fishing Hatchery.

== Route description ==
Wyoming Highway 435 begins at US Route 16 eight miles east of Ten Sleep. From US 16, Highway 435 travels in a southeasterly direction to the Ten Sleep Fish Hatchery. At 0.78 miles, state maintenance of WYO 435 comes to an end before the roadway crosses Ten Sleep Creek and the Fish Hatchery entrance. The hatchery located at milepost 1.17.

== Major intersections ==
The entire route is in Washakie County.

Location	mi	km	Destinations	Notes
	0.00	0.00	US 16	Western terminus of WYO 435
	0.78	1.26	Old Hwy. 16	Eastern terminus of WYO 435
1.000 mi = 1.609 km; 1.000 km = 0.621 mi
