= Wyoming Highway 431 =

State highway in Wyoming, United States

Wyoming Highway 431
- Gooseberry Creek Road
- WYO 431 highlighted in red

Route information
- Maintained by WYDOT
- Length: 30.19 mi (48.59 km)

Major junctions
- West end: WYO 120
- East end: US 20 / WYO 789 / WYO 432

Location
- Country: United States
- State: Wyoming
- Counties: Hot Springs, Washakie

Highway system
- Wyoming State Highway System; Interstate; US; State
← WYO 430	→ WYO 432

Wyoming Highway 431 (WYO 431) is a 30.19-mile-long (48.59 km) Wyoming state road in western Washakie County and a small part of northern Hot Springs County. Highway 431 is locally named Gooseberry Creek Road for Gooseberry Creek which it follows for most of its routing.

== Route description ==
Wyoming Highway 431 begins at Wyoming Highway 120 approximately 19 miles southeast of Meeteetse in northern Hot Springs County. WYO 431 proceeds northeast from Highway 120 until it reaches and crosses Gooseberry Creek. Here WYO 431 turns due eastward and roughly parallels the north side of the creek before crossing into Washakie County at approximately 6 miles (9.7 km). A mile later, the Gooseberry Scenic Area is reached, also named after the creek, which lies on the north side of the highway. The scenic area provides panoramic view of the landscape via an overlook. Nearing its end, Highway 431 turns southeasterly, still following Gooseberry Creek, before reaching its eastern end at US 20/WYO 789 and the southern terminus of Wyoming Highway 432 southwest of Worland.

== Major intersections ==
County	Location	mi	km	Destinations	Notes
Hot Springs		0.00	0.00	WYO 120	Western terminus of WYO 431
Washakie		30.02	48.31	US 20 / WYO 789 / WYO 432 north	Eastern terminus of WYO 431; southern terminus of WYO 432
1.000 mi = 1.609 km; 1.000 km = 0.621 mi
