= Powder River Pass =

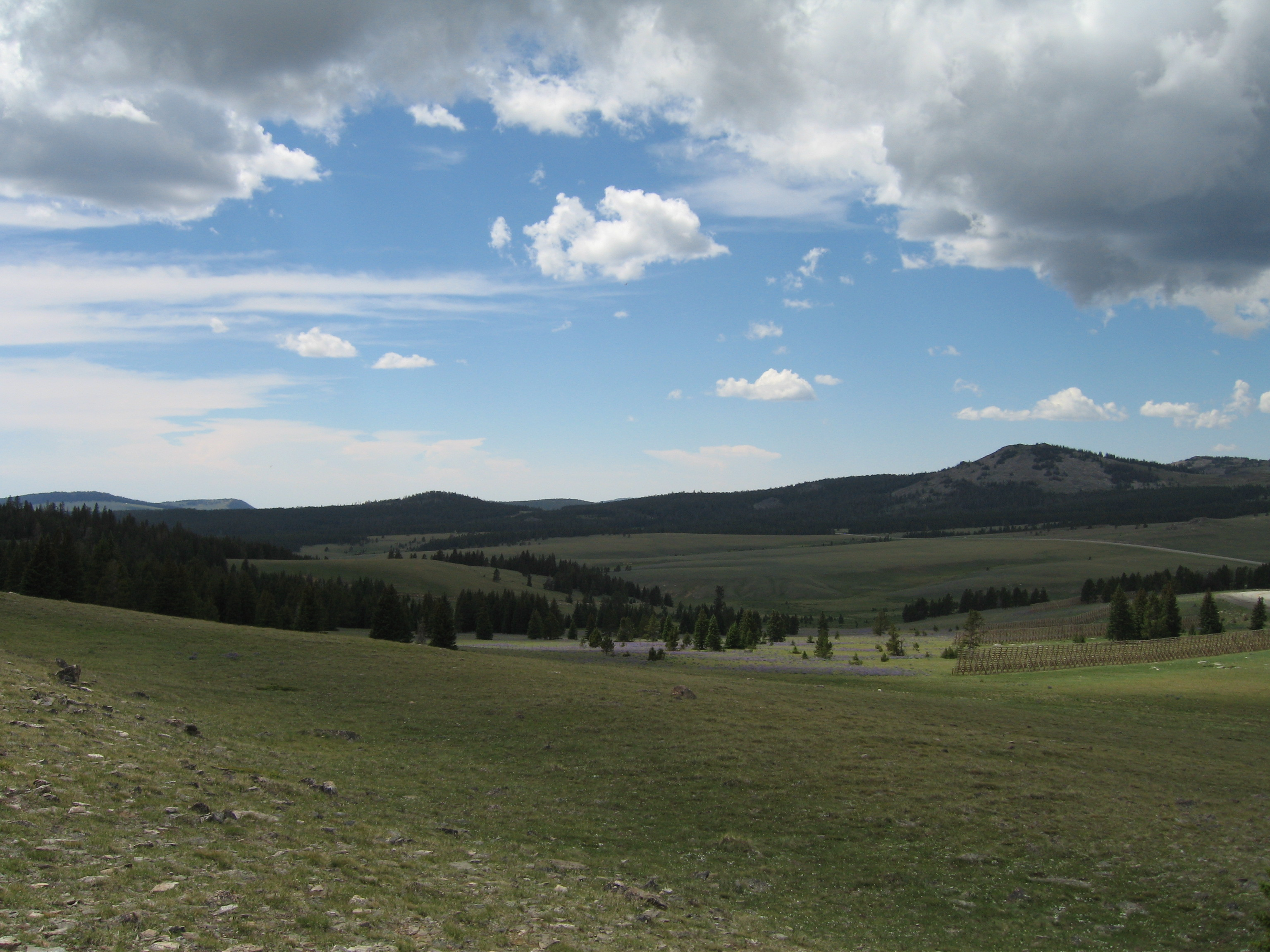
- Powder River Pass, looking west
- Interactive map of Powder River Pass
- Elevation: 9,666 ft (2,946 m)
- Traversed by: U.S. Highway 16

Third Approach
- Location: Johnson County, Wyoming, United States
- Range: Bighorn Mountains
- Coordinates: 44°08′59″N 107°04′46″W

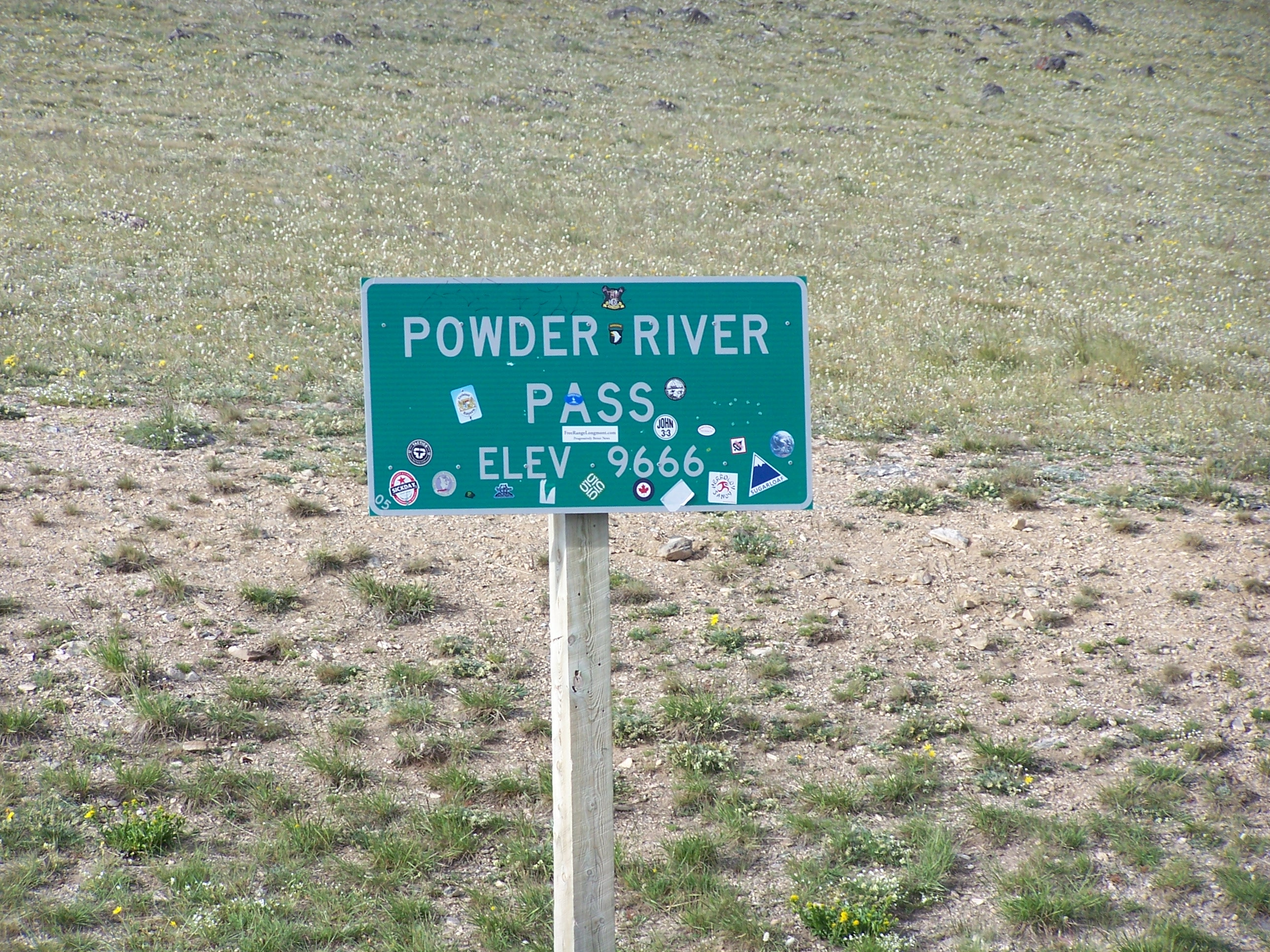
The Powder River Pass sign

Powder River Pass (el. 9,666 ft or 2,946 m) is a mountain pass in the Bighorn Mountains in Wyoming traversed by U.S. Highway 16 (US 16). Also known as Muddy Pass, it is the highest point on US 16. It is between the towns of Buffalo and Ten Sleep.

== Climate ==
Powder River Pass has a subarctic climate (Köppen Dfc).

Climate data for Powder River Pass, Wyoming, 1991–2020 normals: 9480ft (2890m)
Month	Jan	Feb	Mar	Apr	May	Jun	Jul	Aug	Sep	Oct	Nov	Dec	Year
Mean daily maximum °F (°C)	25.6 (−3.6)	26.9 (−2.8)	34.5 (1.4)	39.9 (4.4)	48.1 (8.9)	57.7 (14.3)	66.9 (19.4)	65.5 (18.6)	55.3 (12.9)	42.0 (5.6)	31.6 (−0.2)	24.6 (−4.1)	43.2 (6.2)
Daily mean °F (°C)	17.1 (−8.3)	17.4 (−8.1)	24.1 (−4.4)	29.5 (−1.4)	38.3 (3.5)	46.9 (8.3)	55.0 (12.8)	53.8 (12.1)	45.1 (7.3)	33.3 (0.7)	23.2 (−4.9)	16.4 (−8.7)	33.3 (0.7)
Mean daily minimum °F (°C)	8.7 (−12.9)	7.8 (−13.4)	13.7 (−10.2)	19.0 (−7.2)	28.4 (−2.0)	36.2 (2.3)	43.1 (6.2)	42.2 (5.7)	34.9 (1.6)	24.5 (−4.2)	14.8 (−9.6)	8.3 (−13.2)	23.5 (−4.7)
Average precipitation inches (mm)	1.92 (49)	2.04 (52)	2.37 (60)	3.36 (85)	3.81 (97)	3.13 (80)	1.53 (39)	1.26 (32)	1.99 (51)	2.34 (59)	1.83 (46)	1.69 (43)	27.27 (693)
Source 1: XMACIS2
Source 2: NOAA (Precipitation)
