= Riverside High School (Wyoming) =

Public school in Basin, Wyoming, US

Coordinates: 44°22′47″N 108°02′51″W

Location
- 919 West B St. Basin, Wyoming 82410

Information
- School district: Big Horn County School District #4
- NCES District ID: 5601090
- NCES School ID: 560109000036
- Teaching staff: 17.90 (FTE)
- Grades: 9-12
- Enrolment: 126 (2023-2024)
- Student to teacher ratio: 7.04
- Campus type: Remote
- Colors: Red, white and black
- Team name: Rebels
- Newspaper: The Ramblin' Rebel
- Feeder schools: Cloud Peak Middle School
- Website: www.bgh4.org/o/rmhs

Riverside High School is a public high school in Basin, Wyoming, United States. It is attended by students from throughout Big Horn County School District #4. The mascot is the rebel.

== Demographics ==
As of the 2012–2013 school year, Riverside's enrollment was 94. The student population was 54% male, 46% female, 81% white, 18% Hispanic, and 1% of two or more races.

== Athletics ==
Riverside sponsors five teams, nicknamed the Rebels: football, boys' and girls' basketball, track and field, and volleyball. In 1999 and 2000, the men's basketball team won the Wyoming High School Activities Association (WHSAA) Class 2A State Basketball Championship. In 2007, the football team won the WHSAA State 2A Championship.

== Activities ==
Riverside won the Wyoming Academic Challenge state titles for small schools in 1997, 1998, 1999, 2007, 2009, and 2011. They also won overall state titles in 1998 and 2009.
