= Lost Cabin, Wyoming =

Coordinates: 43°17′11″N 107°37′57″W

Lost Cabin is an unincorporated community in Fremont County, Wyoming, United States.

== History ==
A post office called Lost Cabin was established in 1886, and remained in operation until 1966. The community received its name from a pioneer incident in which a party of prospectors escaped from Native Americans, only to find later their cabins had disappeared from the site.

== In popular culture ==
In his poem The Ballad of Jesus Ortiz, Dana Gioia describes how his great-grandfather, a Mexican immigrant from Sonora, worked as a Wild West cow-puncher and was later murdered by a disgruntled and racist patron while working as a saloon keeper at Lost Cabin in 1910.
