= Hyattville, Wyoming =

Census-designated place in Big Horn County, Wyoming, United States

- CDP
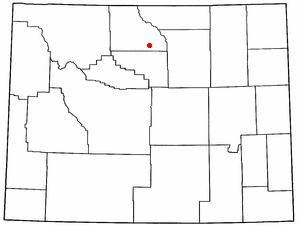
- Location of Hyattville, Wyoming

- Location in the United States
- Coordinates: 44°14′56″N 107°36′35″W
- Country: United States
- State: Wyoming
- County: Big Horn

Area
  - Total: 4.1 sq mi (10.5 km^{2})
  - Land: 4.1 sq mi (10.5 km^{2})
  - Water: 0 sq mi (0.0 km^{2})
- Elevation: 4,475 ft (1,364 m)

Population (2010)
  - Total: 75
  - Density: 18/sq mi (7.1/km^{2})
- Time zone: UTC-7 (Mountain (MST))
  - Summer (DST): UTC-6 (MDT)
- ZIP code: 82428
- Area code: 307
- FIPS code: 56-39395
- GNIS feature ID: 2408412

Hyattville is a census-designated place (CDP) in Big Horn County, Wyoming, United States. The population was 75 at the 2010 census.

== Geography ==
According to the United States Census Bureau, the CDP has a total area of 4.1 square miles (10.6 km^{2}), all land.

== Demographics ==
As of the census of 2000, there were 73 people, 32 households, and 20 families residing in the CDP. The population density was 17.9 people per square mile (6.9/km^{2}). There were 62 housing units at an average density of 15.2/sq mi (5.9/km^{2}). The racial makeup of the CDP was 97.26% White, 1.37% Asian, and 1.37% from two or more races.

There were 32 households, out of which 25.0% had children under the age of 18 living with them, 53.1% were married couples living together, 9.4% had a female householder with no husband present, and 34.4% were non-families. 31.3% of all households were made up of individuals, and 15.6% had someone living alone who was 65 years of age or older. The average household size was 2.28 and the average family size was 2.81.

In the CDP, the population was spread out, with 26.0% under the age of 18, 5.5% from 18 to 24, 21.9% from 25 to 44, 27.4% from 45 to 64, and 19.2% who were 65 years of age or older. The median age was 42 years. For every 100 females, there were 102.8 males. For every 100 females age 18 and over, there were 100.0 males.

The median income for a household in the CDP was $23,125, and the median income for a family was $45,625. Males had a median income of $29,375 versus $17,813 for females. The per capita income for the CDP was $20,324. There were 11.8% of families and 6.5% of the population living below the poverty line, including no under eighteens and none of those over 64.

== Education ==
Public education in the community of Hyattville is provided by Big Horn County School District #4. The district has four campuses – Laura Irwin Elementary School (grades K-4), Manderson Elementary School (grade 5), Cloud Peak Middle School (grades 6–8), and Riverside High School (grades 9–12).

Hyattville has a public library, a branch of the Big Horn County Library System.

== See also ==
- List of census-designated places in Wyoming
