= Basin, Wyoming =

Town in Big Horn County, Wyoming, United States

- Town
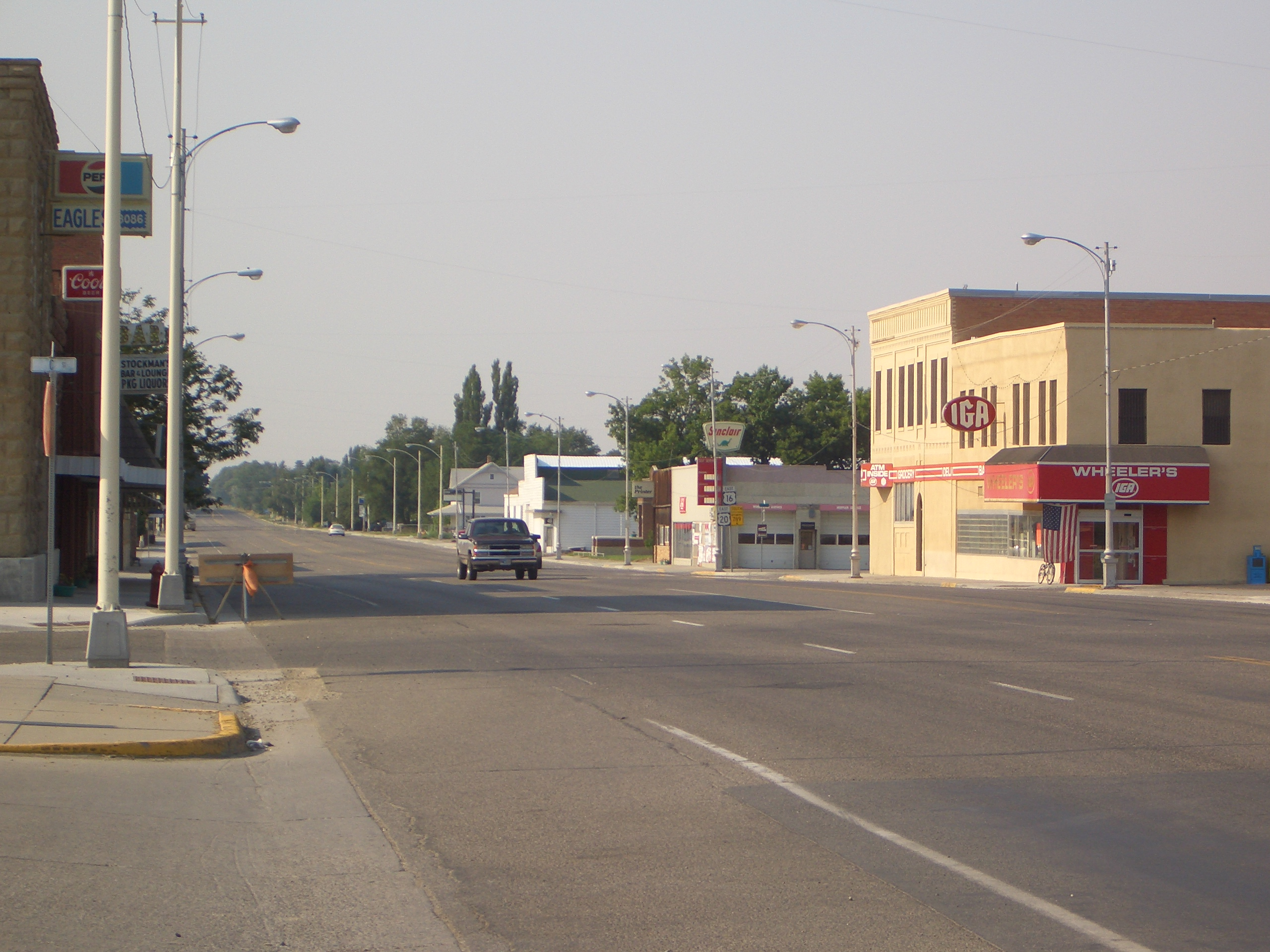
- Downtown Basin, Wyoming

- Flag Seal
- Nickname: Lilac City
- Location of Basin in Big Horn County, Wyoming
- Coordinates: 44°22′34″N 108°02′44″W
- Country: United States
- State: Wyoming
- County: Big Horn
- Incorporated: 1902

Government
  - Type: Mayor-Council

Area
  - Total: 2.39 sq mi (6.19 km^{2})
  - Land: 2.36 sq mi (6.12 km^{2})
  - Water: 0.027 sq mi (0.07 km^{2})
- Elevation: 3,901 ft (1,189 m)

Population (2020)
  - Total: 1,288
  - Density: 542.5/sq mi (209.47/km^{2})
- Time zone: UTC-7 (Mountain (MST))
  - Summer (DST): UTC-6 (MDT)
- ZIP code: 82410
- Area code: 307
- FIPS code: 56-05320
- GNIS feature ID: 2411666
- Website: www.thetownofbasin.com

Basin is a town in and the county seat of Big Horn County, Wyoming, United States. The population was 1,288 at the 2020 census. The community is located near the center of the Bighorn Basin with the Big Horn River east of the town. Basin's post office, built in 1919, is listed on the National Register of Historic Places.

== History ==
Winfield S. Collins founded "Basin City" in 1896 as the county seat for newly created Big Horn County. The first building was home to the "Basin City Herald". The town was incorporated in 1902 as simply "Basin". Collins was the first mayor.

== Geography ==
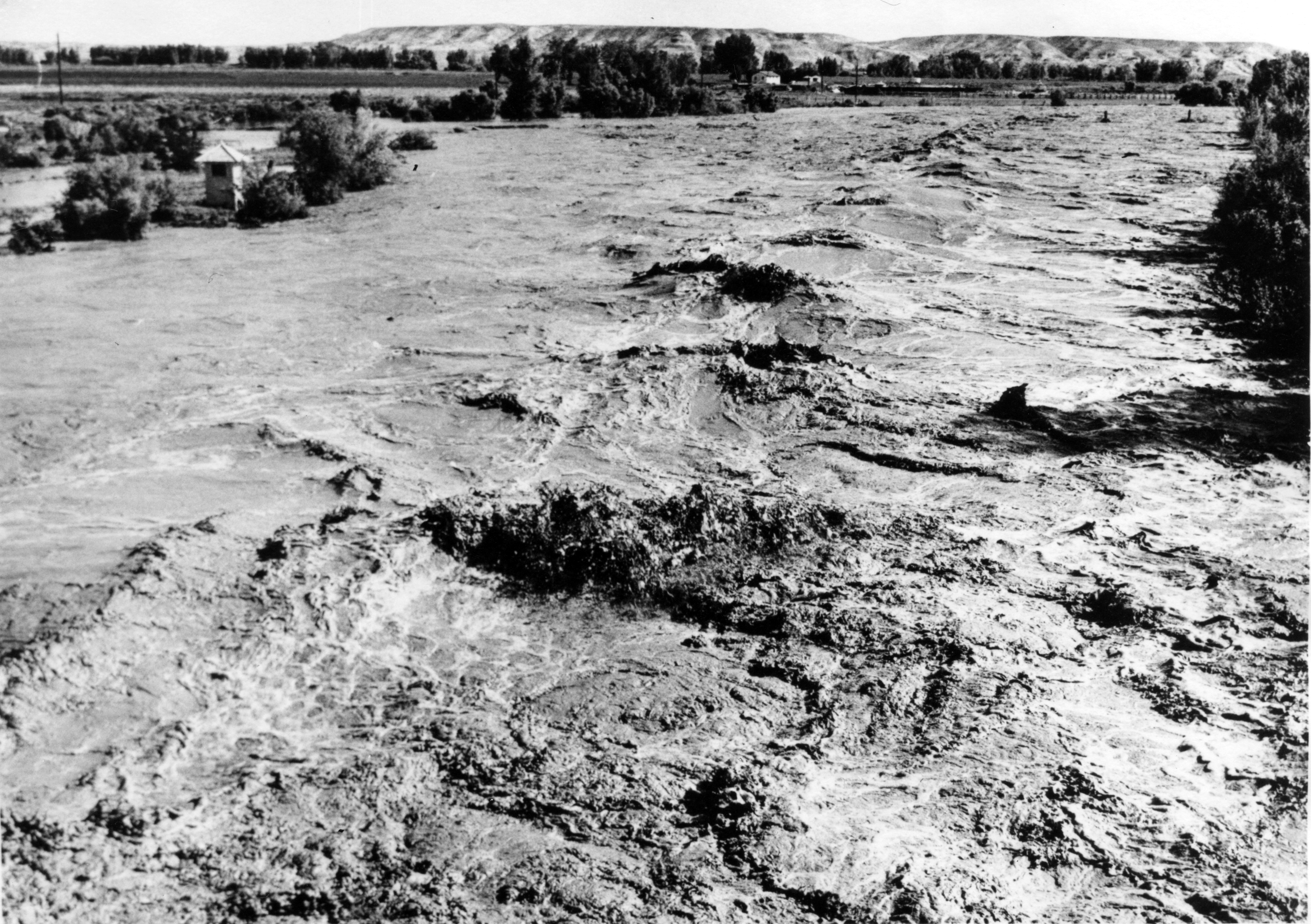
Flooding of Greybull River near Basin, Wyoming in June 1963, where the peak flow was 19,400 cubic feet per second (550 m^{3}/s)

According to the United States Census Bureau, the town has a total area of 2.43 square miles (6.29 km^{2}), of which 2.40 square miles (6.22 km^{2}) is land and 0.03 square miles (0.08 km^{2}) is water.

=== Climate ===
Basin has a cold desert climate (Köppen climate classification BWk). The town had the highest temperature ever recorded in Wyoming, 115 °F (46 °C), on August 8, 1983, and also holds the state record high temperatures for April (93 °F or 33.9 °C in 1948) and July (114 °F or 45.6 °C in 1900).

In general, the eastern portion of the Bighorn Basin is hotter than the rest of Wyoming during the summer months. Due to frequent low humidity, daily temperature ranges are large, whilst due to the very dry conditions snowfall is among the lightest in the northern Rockies and Plains region – it is not uncommon for no measurable precipitation to fall in a month between September and April. There are an average of 49.4 days annually with highs of 90 °F (32 °C) or higher, 5.4 days greater than 100 °F (38 °C) and an average of 176.2 nights with lows of 32 °F (0 °C) or lower. The all-time record low for Basin was −51 °F (−46 °C) on February 5, 1899. The wettest calendar year in Basin was 2011 with 10.84 inches (275 mm) and the driest 1902 with 2.63 inches (67 mm). The most precipitation in one month was 4.56 inches (116 mm) in June 1967. The most precipitation in 24 hours was 2.23 inches (57 mm) on June 29, 1909. The most snowfall in one season was 38.50 inches (0.978 m) between July 1958 and June 1959, whilst the most snow in one month was 23.0 inches (0.58 m) during September 1984.

Climate data for Basin 1991–2020 normals, extremes 1898–present
Month	Jan	Feb	Mar	Apr	May	Jun	Jul	Aug	Sep	Oct	Nov	Dec	Year
Record high °F (°C)	64 (18)	73 (23)	82 (28)	90 (32)	99 (37)	110 (43)	112 (44)	115 (46)	102 (39)	91 (33)	77 (25)	67 (19)	115 (46)
Mean maximum °F (°C)	47.9 (8.8)	55.1 (12.8)	72.3 (22.4)	81.9 (27.7)	89.0 (31.7)	97.4 (36.3)	101.9 (38.8)	99.8 (37.7)	94.7 (34.8)	82.9 (28.3)	64.2 (17.9)	51.3 (10.7)	102.4 (39.1)
Mean daily maximum °F (°C)	32.4 (0.2)	39.1 (3.9)	54.1 (12.3)	63.0 (17.2)	72.8 (22.7)	83.7 (28.7)	92.7 (33.7)	91.0 (32.8)	79.3 (26.3)	62.9 (17.2)	46.4 (8.0)	33.8 (1.0)	62.6 (17.0)
Daily mean °F (°C)	20.6 (−6.3)	26.8 (−2.9)	40.7 (4.8)	49.8 (9.9)	59.8 (15.4)	69.2 (20.7)	76.5 (24.7)	74.1 (23.4)	63.4 (17.4)	49.2 (9.6)	34.6 (1.4)	22.6 (−5.2)	48.9 (9.4)
Mean daily minimum °F (°C)	8.8 (−12.9)	14.6 (−9.7)	27.4 (−2.6)	36.5 (2.5)	46.8 (8.2)	54.7 (12.6)	60.3 (15.7)	57.2 (14.0)	47.5 (8.6)	35.5 (1.9)	22.8 (−5.1)	11.4 (−11.4)	35.3 (1.8)
Mean minimum °F (°C)	−16.3 (−26.8)	−10.3 (−23.5)	5.1 (−14.9)	19.2 (−7.1)	28.8 (−1.8)	40.4 (4.7)	48.6 (9.2)	43.9 (6.6)	32.0 (0.0)	17.1 (−8.3)	−0.6 (−18.1)	−9.7 (−23.2)	−22.3 (−30.2)
Record low °F (°C)	−43 (−42)	−51 (−46)	−31 (−35)	−4 (−20)	18 (−8)	30 (−1)	36 (2)	34 (1)	14 (−10)	−7 (−22)	−28 (−33)	−43 (−42)	−51 (−46)
Average precipitation inches (mm)	0.24 (6.1)	0.32 (8.1)	0.31 (7.9)	0.75 (19)	1.37 (35)	1.04 (26)	0.41 (10)	0.32 (8.1)	0.95 (24)	0.79 (20)	0.36 (9.1)	0.30 (7.6)	7.16 (180.9)
Average snowfall inches (cm)	3.4 (8.6)	4.1 (10)	2.3 (5.8)	1.5 (3.8)	0.1 (0.25)	0.0 (0.0)	0.0 (0.0)	0.0 (0.0)	0.2 (0.51)	1.5 (3.8)	3.0 (7.6)	4.0 (10)	20.1 (50.36)
Average precipitation days (≥ 0.01 in)	3.4	3.6	3.1	5.1	7.1	6.0	3.2	3.6	4.7	4.0	3.3	3.3	50.4
Average snowy days (≥ 0.1 in)	2.5	2.6	1.4	0.7	0.1	0.0	0.0	0.0	0.1	0.7	1.7	2.3	12.1
Source: NOAA

== Demographics ==
Historical population
Census	Pop.	Note	%±
1910	763		—
1920	1,088		42.6%
1930	903		−17.0%
1940	1,099		21.7%
1950	1,220		11.0%
1960	1,319		8.1%
1970	1,145		−13.2%
1980	1,349		17.8%
1990	1,180		−12.5%
2000	1,238		4.9%
2010	1,285		3.8%
2020	1,288		0.2%
2023 (est.)	1,330	▲	3.3%
U.S. Decennial Census

=== 2010 census ===
As of the census of 2010, there were 1,285 people, 520 households, and 333 families residing in the town. The population density was 535.4 inhabitants per square mile (206.7/km^{2}). There were 571 housing units at an average density of 237.9 per square mile (91.9/km^{2}). The racial makeup of the town was 94.2% White, 0.5% African American, 1.9% Native American, 0.5% Asian, 1.6% from other races, and 1.3% from two or more races. Hispanic or Latino people of any race were 5.4% of the population.

There were 520 households, of which 25.0% had children under the age of 18 living with them, 51.9% were married couples living together, 8.3% had a female householder with no husband present, 3.8% had a male householder with no wife present, and 36.0% were non-families. 31.5% of all households were made up of individuals, and 15.8% had someone living alone who was 65 years of age or older. The average household size was 2.27 and the average family size was 2.83.

The median age in the town was 46.4 years. 20.1% of residents were under the age of 18; 6.7% were between the ages of 18 and 24; 21.5% were from 25 to 44; 27.2% were from 45 to 64; and 24.4% were 65 years of age or older. The gender makeup of the town was 50.0% male and 50.0% female.

=== 2000 census ===
As of the census of 2000, there were 1,238 people, 504 households, and 330 families residing in the town. The population density was 613.7 people per square mile (236.6/km^{2}). There were 565 housing units at an average density of 280.1 per square mile (108.0/km^{2}). The racial makeup of the town was 96.77% White, 0.08% African American, 1.05% Native American, 0.24% Asian, 0.97% from other races, and 0.89% from two or more races. Hispanic or Latino people of any race were 2.26% of the population.

There were 504 households, out of which 22.2% had children under the age of 18 living with them, 56.3% were married couples living together, 6.3% had a female householder with no husband present, and 34.5% were non-families. 31.3% of all households were made up of individuals, and 16.5% had someone living alone who was 65 years of age or older. The average household size was 2.20 and the average family size was 2.74.

In the town, the population was spread out, with 20.1% under the age of 18, 5.5% from 18 to 24, 19.6% from 25 to 44, 27.9% from 45 to 64, and 26.9% who were 65 years of age or older. The median age was 48 years. For every 100 females, there were 90.8 males. For every 100 females age 18 and over, there were 86.6 males.

The median income for a household in the town was $33,519, and the median income for a family was $42,768. Males had a median income of $33,942 versus $20,139 for females. The per capita income for the town was $17,890. About 6.1% of families and 11.6% of the population were below the poverty line, including 17.5% of those under age 18 and 12.7% of those age 65 or over.

== Economy ==
The main industries are bentonite mining, farming, sugar beet and bean processing, and tourism.

== Government ==
Basin has a mayor and town council. There are four council members. In 2026 CJ Duncan was mayor.

The United States Postal Service operates the Basin Post Office.

== Arts and culture ==
Basin is known as the "lilac town". In 1910 the community began a tree and shrub planting campaign. In 1936 it became a "lilac town" drive.

The town hosts the Big Horn County Fair each summer.

Basin has a public library, a branch of the Big Horn County Library System.

== Education ==
Public education in the town of Basin is provided by Big Horn County School District #4. The district has three schools across a single campus – Laura Irwin Elementary School (grades K-5), Riverside Middle School (grades 6–8), and Riverside High School (grades 9–12). The middle school and high school both operate under one building, which is adjacent to the elementary school building.

== Health services ==
The Wyoming Department of Health Wyoming Retirement Center, a nursing home, is located in Basin. The facility was operated by the Wyoming Board of Charities and Reform until that agency was dissolved as a result of a state constitutional amendment passed in November 1990.

== Transportation ==
Intercity bus service to the city is provided by Express Arrow.

== See also ==
- List of municipalities in Wyoming
- Basin Republican-Rustler Printing Building
