= Manderson, Wyoming =

- Town
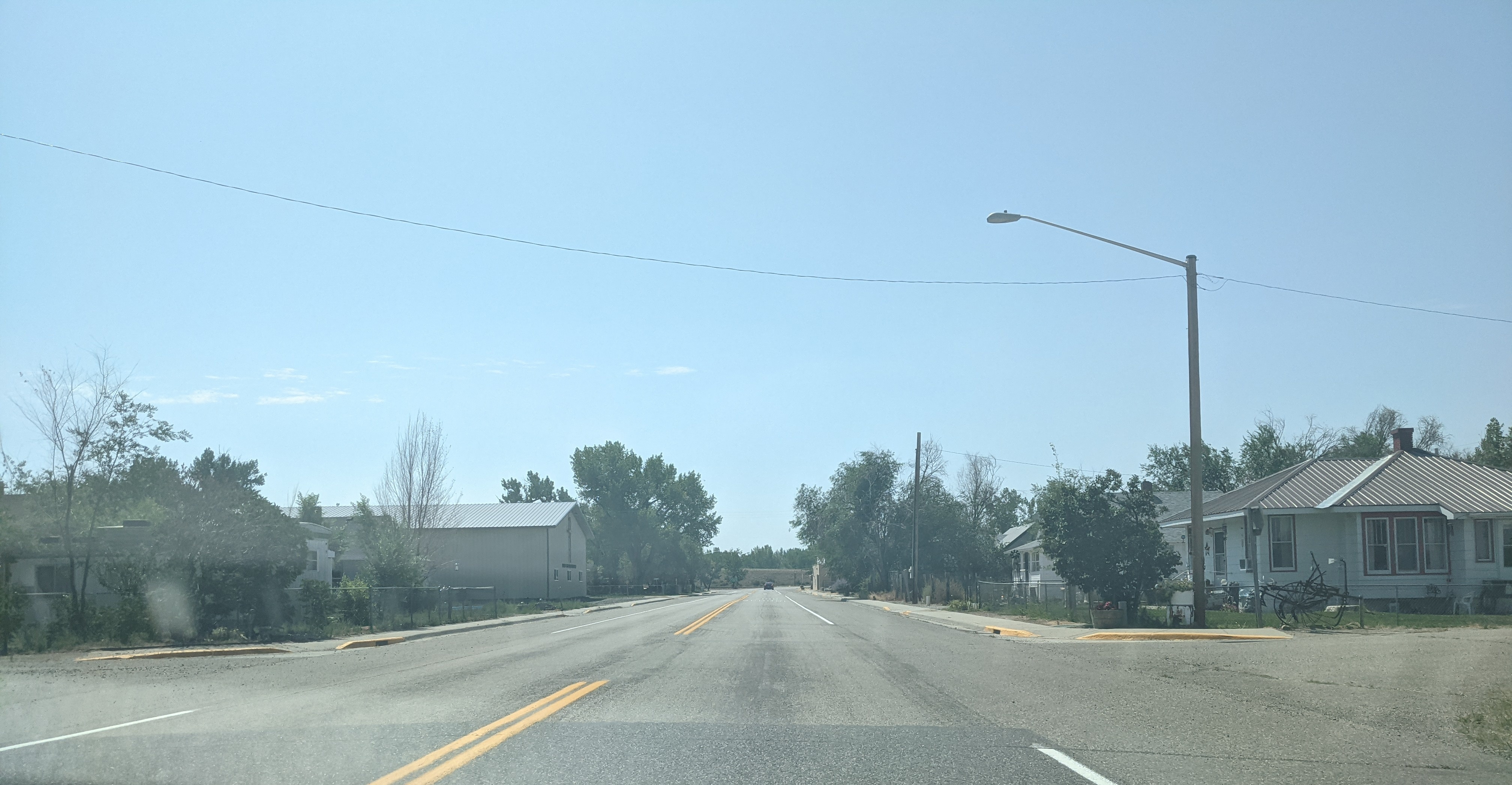
- View down Highway 31 in Manderson, Wyoming

- Location of Manderson in Big Horn County, Wyoming.
- Coordinates: 44°16′12″N 107°57′50″W
- Country: United States
- State: Wyoming
- County: Big Horn

Area
  - Total: 0.90 sq mi (2.34 km^{2})
  - Land: 0.85 sq mi (2.21 km^{2})
  - Water: 0.050 sq mi (0.13 km^{2})
- Elevation: 3,898 ft (1,188 m)

Population (2020)
  - Total: 88
  - Density: 132.5/sq mi (51.14/km^{2})
- Time zone: UTC-7 (Mountain (MST))
  - Summer (DST): UTC-6 (MDT)
- ZIP code: 82432
- Area code: 307
- FIPS code: 56-49980
- GNIS feature ID: 2412940

Manderson is a town in Big Horn County, Wyoming, United States. The population was 88 at the 2020 census. The town was originally called Alamo, but it was renamed in 1889 in honor of Charles F. Manderson, chief counsel for Burlington Railroad. The town is widely regarded as a speed trap for tourists heading to Yellowstone National Park.

== Geography ==
According to the United States Census Bureau, the town has a total area of 0.90 square miles (2.33 km^{2}), of which 0.85 square miles (2.20 km^{2}) is land and 0.05 square miles (0.13 km^{2}) is water.

The Town of Manderson limits include approximately 8/10th of a mile of Wyoming State Highway 31 and 8/10th of a mile of U.S. Highway 16/20.

== Demographics ==
Historical population
Census	Pop.	Note	%±
1930	96		—
1940	130		35.4%
1950	107		−17.7%
1960	167		56.1%
1970	117		−29.9%
1980	174		48.7%
1990	83		−52.3%
2000	104		25.3%
2010	114		9.6%
2020	88		−22.8%
U.S. Decennial Census

=== 2020 census ===
As of the census of 2020, there were 88 people, and 48 households residing in the town.

The median Household income of $29,000 with an employment rate of 74.7%

=== 2010 census ===
As of the census of 2010, there were 114 people, 50 households, and 31 families residing in the town. The population density was 134.1 inhabitants per square mile (51.8/km^{2}). There were 56 housing units at an average density of 65.90 per square mile (25.4/km^{2}). The racial makeup of the town was 94.7% White, 2.6% from other races, and 2.6% from two or more races. Hispanic or Latino of any race were 9.6% of the population.

There were 50 households, of which 30.0% had children under the age of 18 living with them, 44.0% were married couples living together, 10.0% had a female householder with no husband present, 8.0% had a male householder with no wife present, and 38.0% were non-families. 30.0% of all households were made up of individuals, and 16% had someone living alone who was 65 years of age or older. The average household size was 2.28 and the average family size was 2.81.

The median age in the town was 47.5 years. 23.7% of residents were under the age of 18; 4.3% were between the ages of 18 and 24; 15.8% were from 25 to 44; 35.8% were from 45 to 64; and 20.2% were 65 years of age or older. The gender makeup of the town was 49.1% male and 50.9% female.

=== 2000 census ===
As of the census of 2000, there were 104 people, 44 households, and 27 families residing in the town. The population density was 123.5 people per square mile (47.8/km^{2}). There were 51 housing units at an average density of 60.5 per square mile (23.4/km^{2}). The racial makeup of the town was 92.31% White, 6.73% from other races, and 0.96% from two or more races. Hispanic or Latino of any race were 5.77% of the population.

There were 44 households, out of which 27.3% had children under the age of 18 living with them, 52.3% were married couples living together, 6.8% had a female householder with no husband present, and 38.6% were non-families. 34.1% of all households were made up of individuals, and 9.1% had someone living alone who was 65 years of age or older. The average household size was 2.36 and the average family size was 3.07.

In the town, the population was spread out, with 27.9% under the age of 18, 2.9% from 18 to 24, 28.8% from 25 to 44, 27.9% from 45 to 64, and 12.5% who were 65 years of age or older. The median age was 39 years. For every 100 females, there were 112.2 males. For every 100 females age 18 and over, there were 102.7 males.

The median income for a household in the town was $22,917, and the median income for a family was $30,357. Males had a median income of $18,750 versus $16,250 for females. The per capita income for the town was $11,143. There were 13.3% of families and 14.1% of the population living below the poverty line, including 14.8% of under eighteens and none of those over 64.

== See also ==
- List of towns in Wyoming
