= National Register of Historic Places listings in Washakie County, Wyoming =

Location of Washakie County in Wyoming

This is a list of the National Register of Historic Places listings in Washakie County, Wyoming. It is intended to be a complete list of the properties and districts on the National Register of Historic Places in Washakie County, Wyoming, United States. The locations of National Register properties and districts for which the latitude and longitude coordinates are included below, may be seen in a map.

There are 7 properties and districts listed on the National Register in the county.

This National Park Service list is complete through NPS recent listings posted June 13, 2025.

Contents: Counties in Wyoming
Albany - Big Horn - Campbell - Carbon - Converse - Crook - Fremont - Goshen - Hot Springs - Johnson - Laramie - Lincoln - Natrona - Niobrara - Park - Platte - Sheridan - Sublette - Sweetwater - Teton - Uinta - Washakie - Weston

== Listings county-wide ==
	Name on the Register	Image	Date listed	Location	City or town	Description
1	Ainsworth House	Ainsworth House	September 11, 1986 (#86002321)	Spring Creek Rd. 43°47′49″N 107°18′49″W	Big Trails	Vernacular cabin built in stages 1886–1911, significant as one of the first permanent houses in the Bighorn Basin and as a symbol of the area's shift from large open-range ranching to small owner-occupied homesteads.
2	Emerson Parks House	Emerson Parks House	May 16, 2016 (#16000265)	504 2nd St. 44°02′01″N 107°26′38″W	Ten Sleep	1929 two-story log house, one of the few surviving buildings from Ten Sleep's early years.
3	James T. Saban Lookout	James T. Saban Lookout	November 15, 2016 (#16000781)	Approx..9 mi. SW. of US 16 & FS Rd. 429; 44°08′58″N 107°12′08″W	Ten Sleep vicinity	1942 fire lookout tower, a well-preserved attestation of early-20th-century firefighting efforts in U.S. national forests and of Civilian Conservation Corps contributions in Wyoming.
4	Ten Sleep Mercantile	Ten Sleep Mercantile	September 11, 1986 (#86002324)	201 2nd St. 44°02′03″N 107°26′59″W	Ten Sleep	1905 general store exemplifying the initial commercial establishments serving the essential needs of frontier ranchers, and a longstanding focal point of Ten Sleep.
5	West Side School	West Side School	November 17, 2021 (#100007002)	100 South 3rd St. 44°00′59″N 107°57′56″W	Worland	Wyoming's only known public school specifically built for the segregation of Mexican-American students, active 1936–1956.
6	Worland House	Worland House	February 27, 1986 (#86000310)	520 Culbertson Ave. 44°00′52″N 107°57′41″W	Worland	Exemplary 1917 bungalow style house of Charlie C. Worland, son of Worland's founder and the city's most influential early businessman and entrepreneur.
7	Worland Ranch	Worland Ranch	March 5, 1992 (#92000123)	801 U.S. Route 20; 44°00′41″N 107°58′51″W	Worland	Ranch of Worland's founder C.H. "Dad" Worland (1844–1933), consisting of the original 1900 townsite and 10 contributing ranch properties built 1917–1918.

== See also ==
- List of National Historic Landmarks in Wyoming
- National Register of Historic Places listings in Wyoming
