= Worland =

Worland may refer to:

- Worland (surname)
- Gus Worland: Marathon Man, an Australian reality television series
- Worland, Missouri, United States, an unincorporated community
- Worland, Wyoming, United States, a city
  - Worland High School, a public high school
  - Worland House, a historic building
  - Worland Municipal Airport
  - Worland Ranch
