= Worland (surname) =

Worland

- Don Worland (1932–2021), Australian rules footballer
- Gus Worland, Australian television and radio personality
  - Gus Worland: Marathon Man, an Australian reality television series
- John Worland (1934–2012), Australian rules footballer, brother of Don
- Stephen T. Worland (1923–2017), American economist
- Wilfrid Worland (1907–1999), American architect
