= Emerson Parks House =

Historic house in Ten Sleep, Wyoming, United States

- U.S. National Register of Historic Places
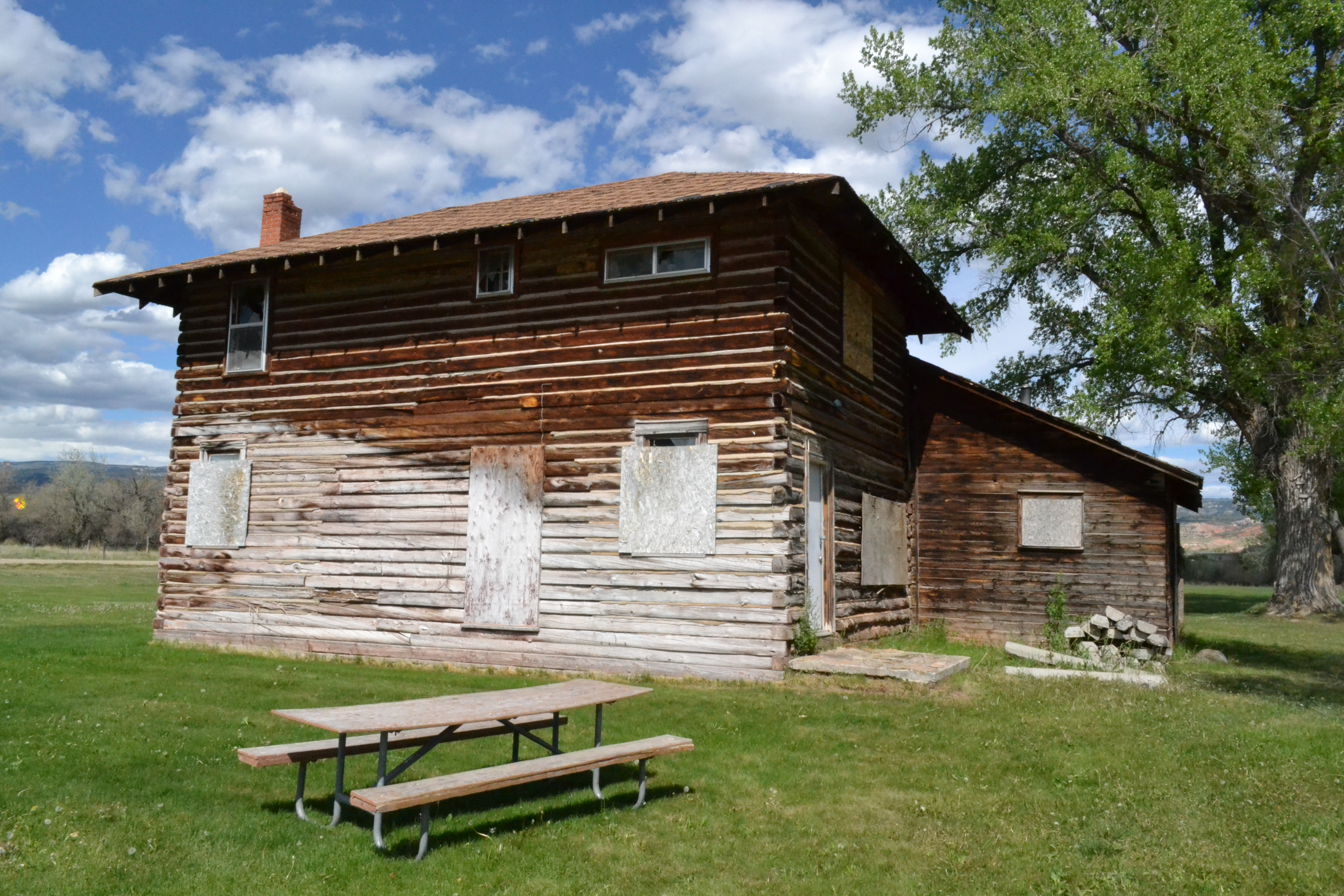
- Emerson Parks House, May 2020

- Location within Wyoming Location within the United States
- Location: 504 2nd St., Ten Sleep, Wyoming
- Coordinates: 44.034192°N 107.444465°W
- Built: 1929
- NRHP reference No.: 16000265
- Added to NRHP: May 16, 2016

The Emerson Parks House is a historic house in Ten Sleep, Wyoming, United States, that that is listed on the National Register of Historic Places (NRHP).

== Description ==
The two-story log house was built in 1929. It was home of Emerson Parks (1887-1965) and his wife Ina Miller Parks.

The house was built using the "butt and pass" method of log construction, a kind of false notching, utilizing D-shaped milled logs presumably from the local Bighorn Mountains.

== See also ==
- National Register of Historic Places listings in Washakie County, Wyoming
