= Fortress Mountain =

Fortress Mountain may refer to:

== Mountains ==
- Fortress Mountain (Alaska), 3,053 ft (931 m), Brooks Range, USA
- Fortress Mountain (Gallatin County, Montana), 9,771 ft (2,978 m), Yellowstone Area, USA
- Fortress Mountain (Washington), 8,760 ft (2,670 m), North Cascades, USA
- Fortress Mountain (Park County, Wyoming), 12,090 ft (3,690 m), Absaroka Range, USA
- The Fortress (Alberta), 3,007 m (9,865 ft), Canadian Rockies, Canada

== Places ==
- Fortress Mountain Resort
