= Nowood River =

River in Wyoming, United States

Coordinates: 44°16′44″N 107°58′14″W

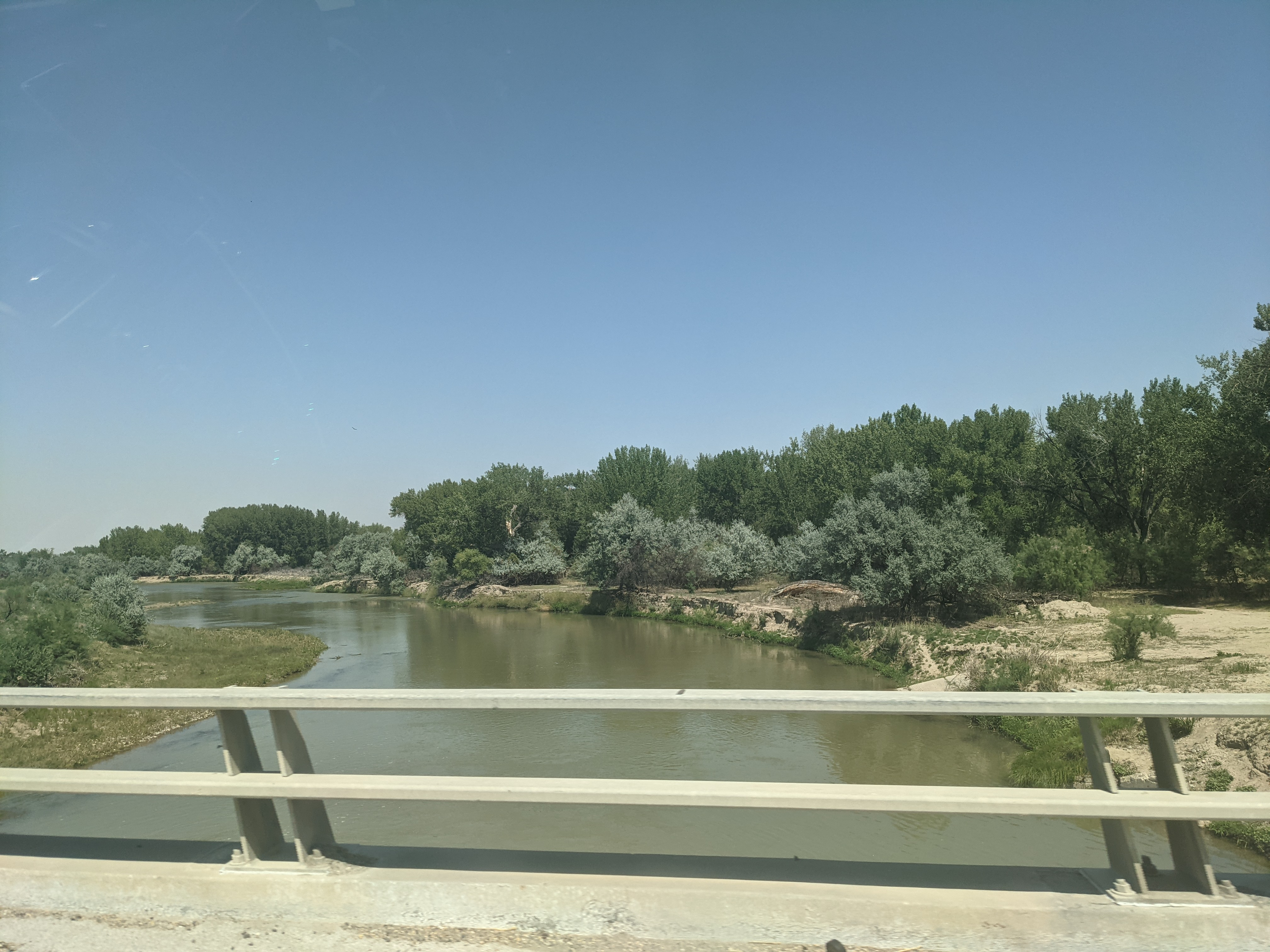
Nowood River near Manderson, August 2021

The Nowood River (also known as Nowood Creek) is a 95-mile-long (153 km) river in Wyoming, United States, that is a tributary of the Bighorn River.

== Description ==
The 95-mile (153 km) river rises in the Bridger Mountains on the southeastern side of the Bighorn Basin. The stream runs north through the foothills of the Bighorn Mountains and past the town of Ten Sleep where it is joined by Tensleep Creek. The river then flows out of the Bighorn mountains to join the Big Horn River near Manderson. Local tradition relates that a group of men arrived on the river and found no wood to construct a fire, thus the name "No wood".

== See also ==
- List of rivers in Wyoming
- Notrees, Texas
