= Ten Sleep Mercantile =

Historic commercial building in Ten Sleep, Wyoming, United States

- U.S. National Register of Historic Places
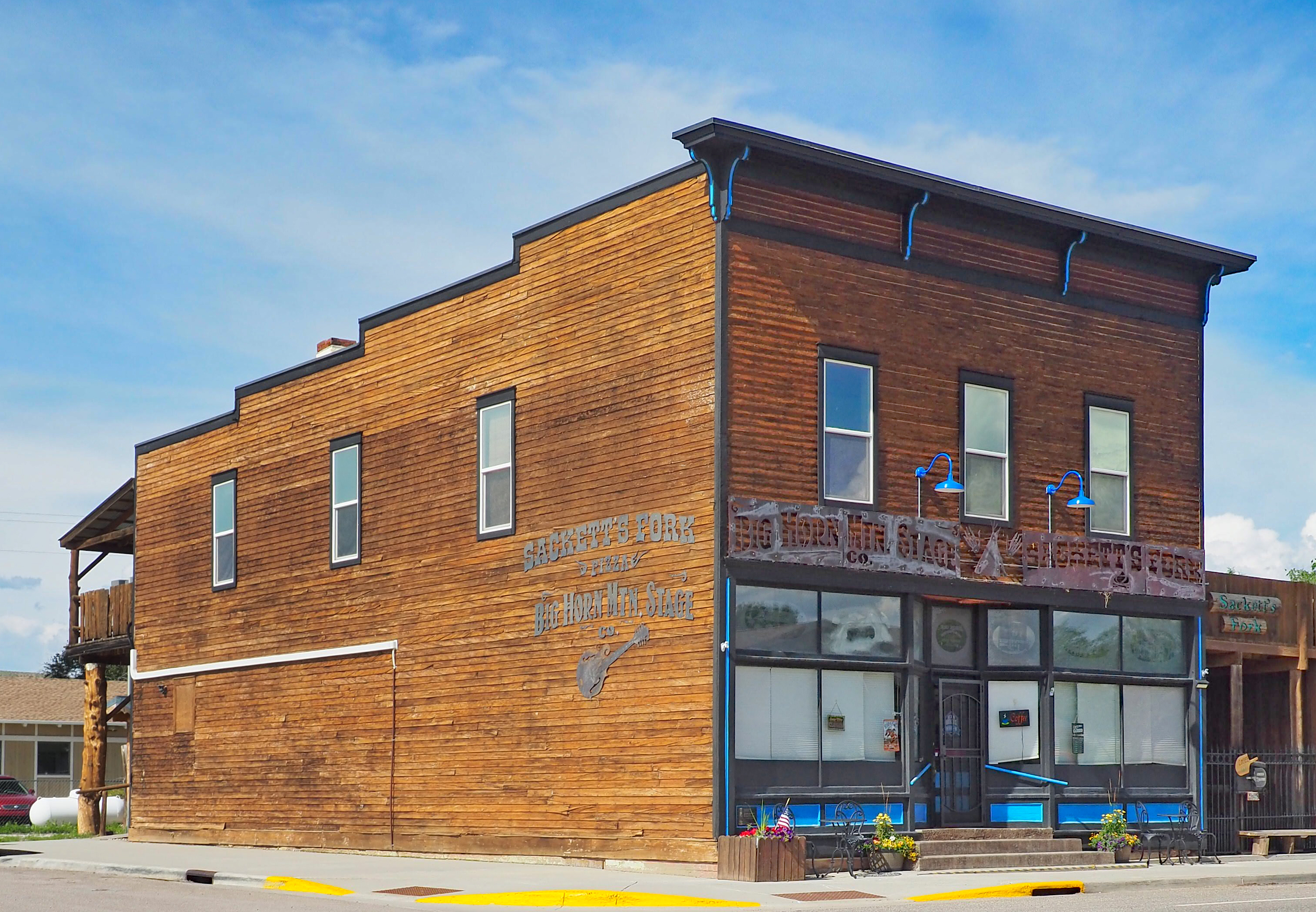
- Ten Sleep Mercantile viewed from the southwest, June 2023

- Location within Wyoming Location within the United States
- Location: 201 Second Street, Ten Sleep, Wyoming
- Coordinates: 44°2′3″N 107°26′59″W
- Built: 1905
- Architect: H.T. Church
- NRHP reference No.: 86002324
- Added to NRHP: September 11, 1986

Ten Sleep Mercantile, also known as Ten Sleep Hardware, is a typical historic small-town general store in Ten Sleep, Wyoming, United States, that is listed on the National Register of Historic Places (PNRHP).

== Description ==
The store has been the focal point of the town since it was built in 1905 by H.T. Church. Upon Church's death in 1918, the property was bought by Buffalo businessman and rancher Alex Healy in an agreement that brought the store under the control of Paul Frison. Frison, who later served as mayor of Ten Sleep and as a Wyoming state legislator, operated the store from 1918 to 1943.

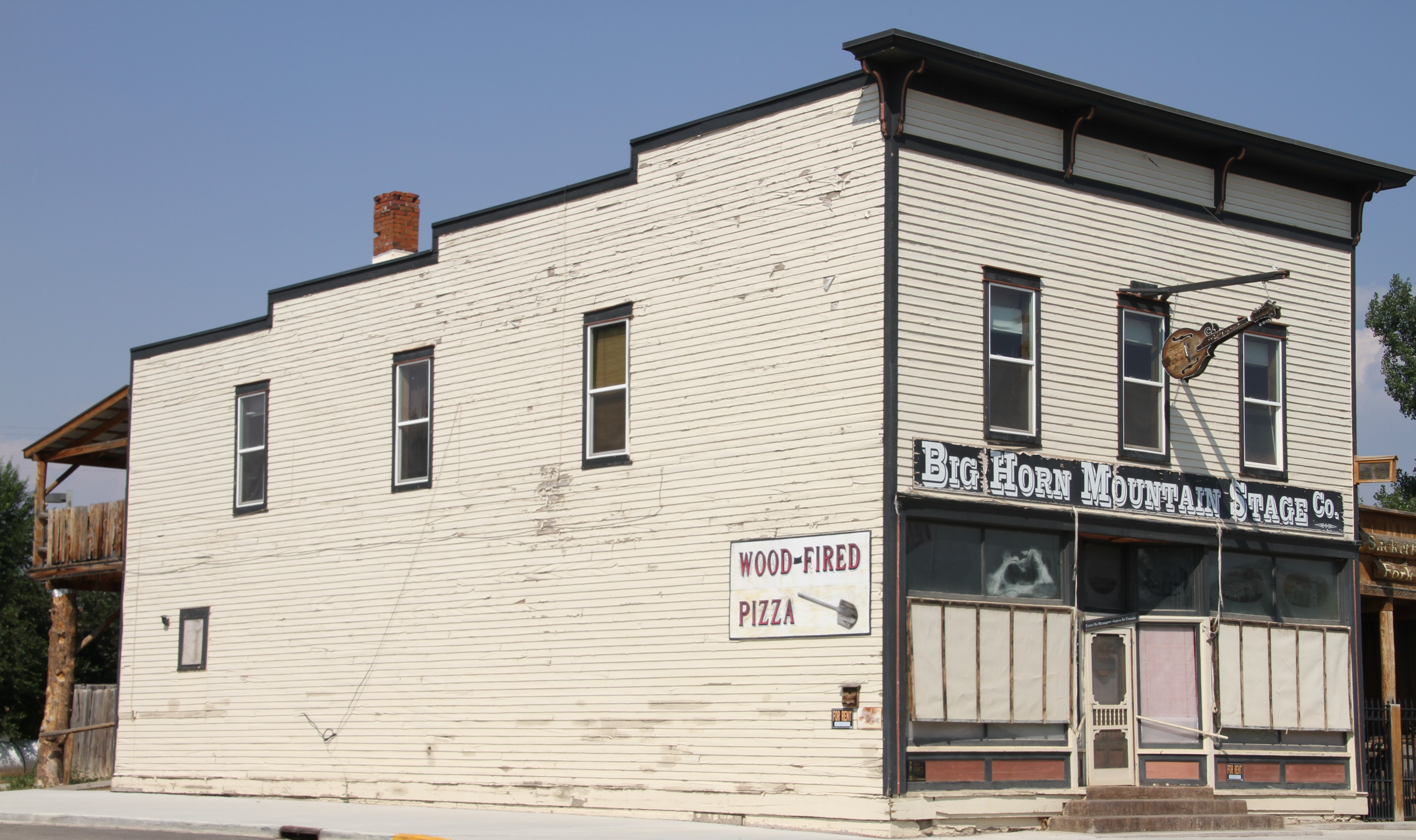
Ten Sleep Mercantile, September 2014

Ten Sleep Mercantile is an example of the tall, narrow and deep commercial buildings commonly found in small American towns. The two-story balloon frame building is the best preserved building of its kind in Ten Sleep. The building is clad in wood clapboards. The front facade features a rod-supported shed roofed porch sheltering display windows and a recessed double door. The second floor has three double-hung windows, while the top of the facade is capped with a simplified bracketed cornice. The side elevations feature a stepped parapet following the single-pitched main roof as it rises from the rear to the front. On the east side a covered stairway climbs to the second floor.

The interior is well-preserved with a large, deep main room, and a pressed tin ceiling and plastered walls. A row of arched columns support the second floor. The second floor originally comprised two large rooms for the live-in owners, now subdivided. An unfinished basement underlies all.

Paul Frison was significant as a local historian who was instrumental in promoting the Black and Yellow Trail, a tourist route on U.S. Route 14 from Chicago to Yellowstone National Park running through Ten Sleep. The trail's name was derived from the fact that it linked the Black Hills and Yellowstone. Established in 1912, the route featured Ten Sleep Canyon, just east of the town.

== See also ==
- National Register of Historic Places listings in Washakie County, Wyoming
