= Girl Scout National Center West =

The Girl Scout National Center West was located just outside Ten Sleep, Wyoming, among the Big Horn Mountains, near the entrance to Ten Sleep Canyon. A portion of the center was one of the largest encampments in the world at 15,400 acres (62 km^{2}) (14,600 acres (59 km^{2}) also reported) of rugged wilderness near the entrance to Ten Sleep Canyon near the Bighorn National Forest. 640 acres (2.6 km^{2}) of those acres were donated by the United States government.

== History ==
The single largest land acquisition in Girl Scouts of the USA history, the center was purchased in 1968. Girl Scouts and Girl Guides from all over the world engaged in outdoor activities including horseback riding, backpacking, fishing, orienteering, exploring Native American pictographs and study of geology. Sample programs that were offered included Hike-A-Peak, a 19-day backpacking event for girls 16–18 years old; Tote 'N Trek, a 9-day backpacking excursion for novice backpackers ages 14–18; Saddle Straddle, a 6-day pack trip for experienced riders; and Paint the West, focusing on arts skills and exploring western art. The site also supported Wider Opportunities, family camping, and camping for troops traveling to other destinations.

In 1978, Mutual of Omaha's Wild Kingdom filmed part of its show at the National Center West, featuring wildlife projects made by Girl Scouts.

== Closure ==
Because of high maintenance costs, the center was closed in 1989; the land was sold in 1991. A part of the site is now owned and operated by The Nature Conservancy as the 9,851 acres (39.87 km^{2}) Tensleep Preserve, with facilities for workshops and seminars. The remaining 4,749 acres (19.22 km^{2}) are part of the Clay Ranch.

== See also ==
- Philmont Scout Ranch
