= Jalan Crossland =

American bluegrass-country musician

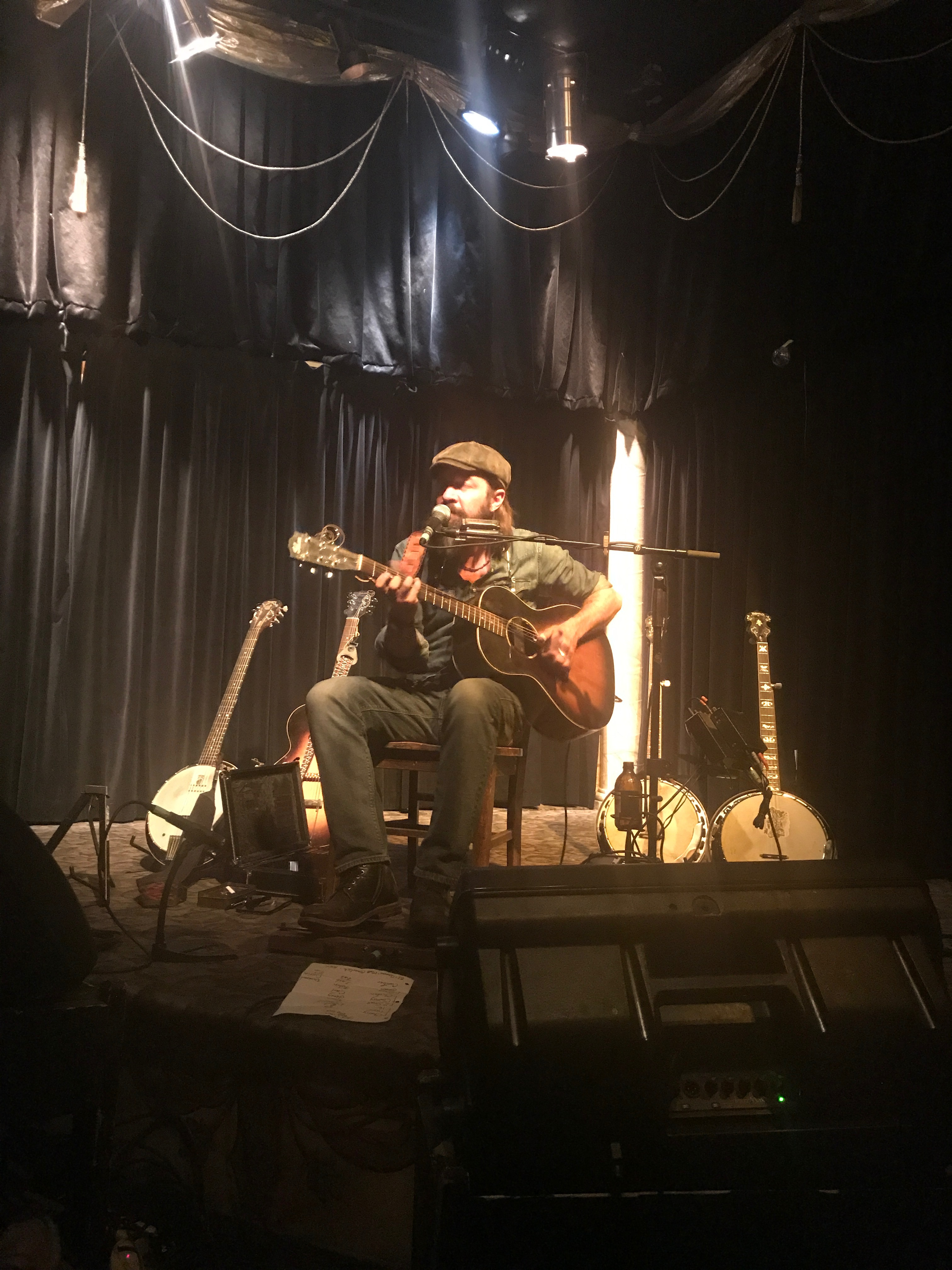
- Crossland performing at Avogadro's Number in Fort Collins in May 2019.

Background information
- Born: Ten Sleep, Wyoming; United States
- Genres: Bluegrass; Alternative country; Americana
- Occupations: Musician; singer; songwriter; bandleader
- Instruments: Vocals; guitar; banjo
- Website: jalancrossland.com

Jalan Crossland is an American bluegrass, Americana, and alternative country singer-songwriter and musician.

== Early life ==
Jalan Crossland was born and raised in Ten Sleep, Wyoming. He attended Ten Sleep High School before his family moved to Pittsburgh where he attended David B. Oliver High School.

Crossland became interested in music as a child, after hearing his uncle play the banjo. In 1997 he placed second in the Winfield National Guitar Fingerpicking Competition. In 1999 he won the first place title at the Wyoming Flatpick Championship.

As a teenager he played electric guitar in a series of heavy metal bands in Pittsburgh. Jalan’s son, Dylan Crossland, was born in 1990 and died in 2015. Jalan worked with country bands as a free-lance guitarist and held a day job in a mobile home factory in Casper. He quit the factory job and began pursuing music full-time.

== Career ==
Crossland is a banjoist, guitarist, and vocalist. He created and recorded on his own label, Boom Chicken Rekkerds. He released his first album, Poor Boy Shanty in 2000. In 2004 he released his second record, Moonshiner. In 2005 he formed the Jalan Crossland Band with bassist Shaun Kelley and drummer Pat Madsen. They released the albums Trailer Park Fire & Other Tragedies in 2006 and Driftwood Souls in 2010. The band took a hiatus in 2011 and Crossland released a solo album titled Portrait of a Fish. The band later reconvened and in 2014, released the album No Cause For Despair. In 2017 the Jalan Crossland Band released the album Singalongs for the Apocalypse. Crossland was awarded Wyoming Public Radio's people's choice award for best Wyoming release of 2017.

In 2013 Crossland was bestowed with the Governor's Arts Award by Matt Mead for his contributions to the arts in Wyoming. He is the second musician to ever receive the award. He was also named a "Wyoming Treasure" by the Wyoming Arts Council.

The Jalan Crossland Band disbanded later in 2017 after Kelley was diagnosed with Parkinson's disease and Madsen moved to the East Coast. The band's final performance was September 22, 2017 at the Wyoming Outdoor Council’s 50th Anniversary and Community Fair in Lander. In March 2019 he released the album Greatest Efforts, a compilation of 19 songs throughout his career which are considered to be fan-favorites. Shaun Kelley died in September 2020.

== Discography ==
=== Solo albums ===
- Jalan Crossland (1997)
- Poor Boy Shanty (2000)
- Moonshiner (2004)
- Portrait of a Fish (2011)
- Greatest Efforts (2019)

=== Jalan Crossland Band ===
- Trailer Park Fire & Other Tragedies (2006)
- Driftwood Souls (2010)
- No Cause For Despair (2014)
- Singalongs for the Apocalypse (2017)
