= Oliver High School =

David B. Oliver High School
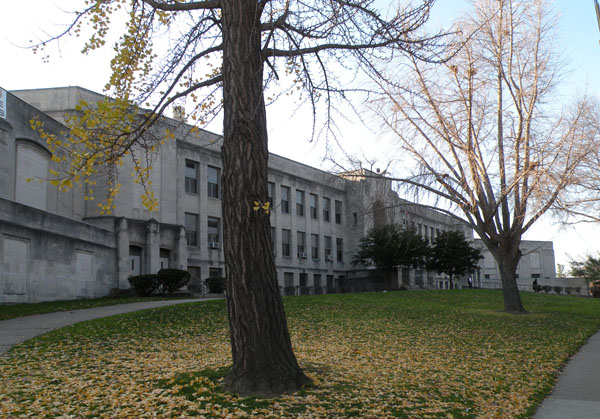
- 2323 Brighton Road; Pittsburgh, PA 15212; United States

Information
- Type: Public
- Established: 1925
- Closed: 2012
- School district: Pittsburgh Public Schools
- Principal: Dennis Chakey
- Grades: 9–12
- Enrollment: 500 as of August. 2010
- Colors: Orange and Seal Brown
- Mascot: Bear
- Representative: Floyd McCrea
- Motto: Believe! Attend to Achieve! Read to Succeed!
- Website: David B. Oliver High School
- David P. Oliver High School
- U.S. National Register of Historic Places
- City of Pittsburgh Historic Structure
- Pittsburgh Landmark – PHLF
- Location within Pittsburgh Location within Pennsylvania Location within the United States
- Location: Brighton Rd. and Island Ave., Pittsburgh, Pennsylvania
- Coordinates: 40°27′50″N 80°1′33″W
- Area: 14 acres (5.7 ha)
- Built: 1924
- Architect: Steen, James T., & Son
- Architectural style: Art Deco
- MPS: Pittsburgh Public Schools TR
- NRHP reference No.: 86002698

Significant dates
- Added to NRHP: February 3, 1987
- Designated CPHS: November 30, 1999
- Designated PHLF: 2001

David B. Oliver High School, commonly known as Oliver High School, was a public school that was located in the Northside area of Pittsburgh, Pennsylvania, United States.

This school was one of ten high schools in the Pittsburgh Public Schools. It was closed in 2012; however, the building remained open as offices.

== History ==
Established February 3, 1925 it is named in the honor of David B. Oliver, President of Pittsburgh Public Schools from 1911–1922. Oliver was largely responsible for the increase in the number and size of Pittsburgh Public Schools. The school sits on land that once was a landfill and is one of ten high schools in the Pittsburgh Public Schools area. The school colors are orange and seal brown, also in reference to Oliver's name (David Brown Oliver).

The school's newspaper has run an advice column "Dear Moppet" since the 1920s. The school's alma mater, written in 1925, originally had as many as seven verses which can be found in several copies of the "Omicron" (the school year book) from the 1970s. Today, however, only one verse is widely known and is sung each day during morning announcements. The school is home to the Zeta Rho chapter of the National Honor Society. The school's original motto 'On, Sail On!' was changed to "Believe, Achieve, Succeed!"

The school serves primarily as a neighborhood school for the surrounding North Side area, and also attracts non-local students to its magnet programs, JROTC and Law and Public Service. Oliver offers all academic programs at the Gifted, Scholars, Advanced Placement and standard academic levels. Oliver offers eight Applied Technology and Career Development Programs for students interested in vocational training.

On November 23, 2011, the Pittsburgh Board of Education approved a facility reform plan that would close Oliver as an active city high school for the 2012–13 school year. The staff and students would be relocated to the Pittsburgh Perry High School, and the Oliver building would remain open as the new home of the district special education offices.

== Notable alumni ==
- Jalan Crossland, bluegrass singer and musician
- Jakim Donaldson (born 1983), basketball player in the Israeli Basketball Premier League
- Calvin Fowler, co-captain of U.S. gold medal basketball team at 1968 Summer Olympics.
- Sammy Nestico, arranger and composer
