= James T. Saban Lookout =

- U.S. National Register of Historic Places
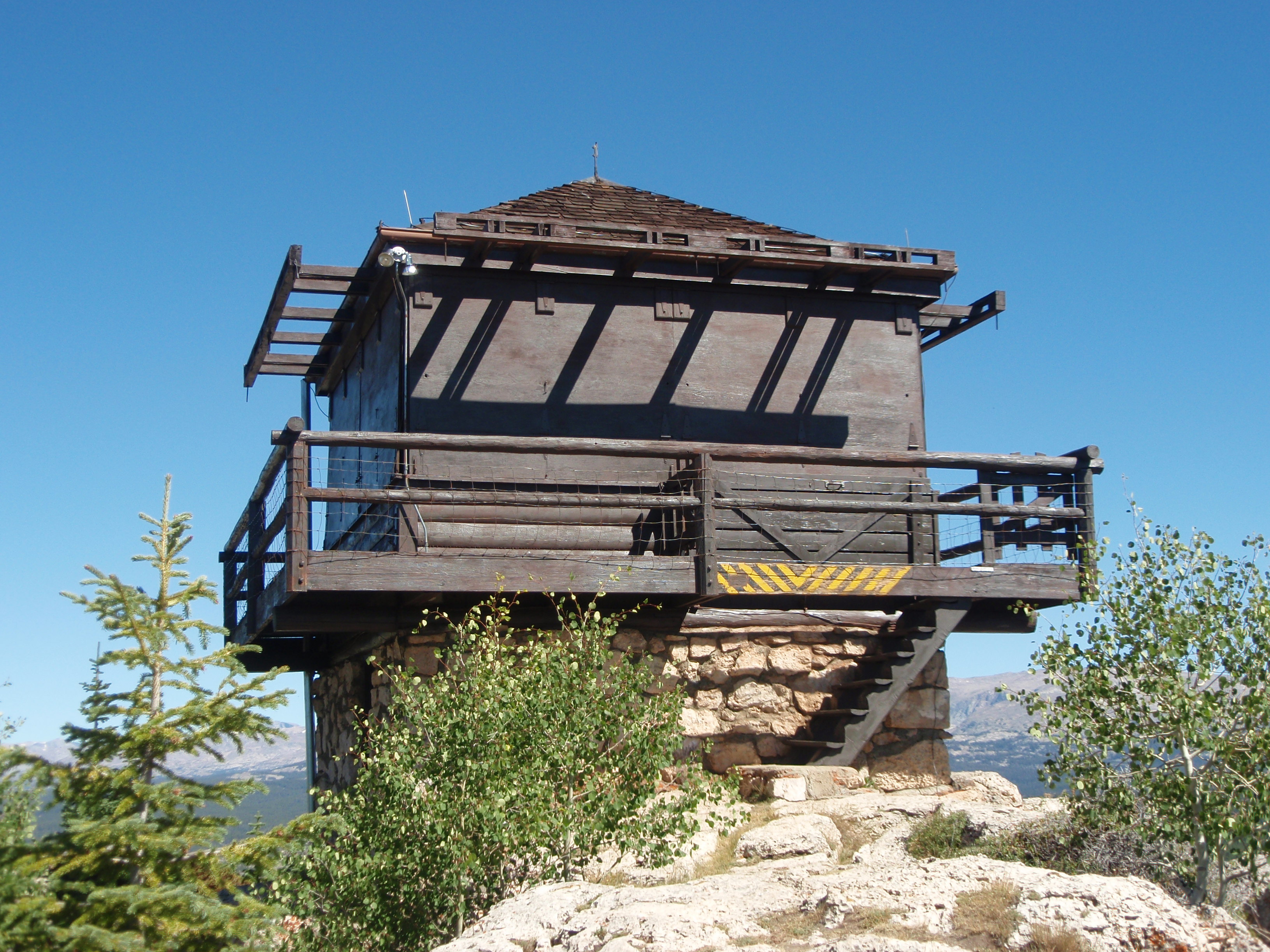

- Location within Wyoming Location within the United States
- Location: Approximately .9 mi SW. of US 16 & FS Rd. 429, in Bighorn National Forest near Ten Sleep, Wyoming
- Coordinates: 44.149343°N 107.202370°W
- Built: 1942
- Built by: Civilian Conservation Corps (CCC)
- NRHP reference No.: 16000781
- Added to NRHP: November 15, 2016

The James T. Saban Lookout, also known as the High Park Lookout, is a fire lookout tower located in Bighorn National Forest near Ten Sleep, Wyoming in Washakie County, Wyoming. It was listed on the National Register of Historic Places in 2016.

== Description ==
The James T. Saban Lookout is a unique fire lookout tower. It is a high roof, fourteen foot (14') by fourteen foot (14') structure made of stone and natural wood.

== History ==
Constructed in 1942 by the Civilian Conservation Corps, the lookout was originally named "High Park Lookout". It was built in Bighorn National Forest and the facility is located just south of U.S. Highway 16 and about 15 miles east of Ten Sleep. James Saban was born in 1901 in Shell, Wyoming. He was enrolled in the Billings Polytechnic Institute for three years. Saban then completed a ninety-day course at the School of Forestry at the University of Montana. His Forest Service career began in 1922 in Bighorn National Park. Passing his Forest Ranger examination in 1923, he then went on to serve in eight different National Forests: Chugach, Selway, Lolo, Flathead, Coeur d’Alene, Medicine Bow, Chippewa, and Wyoming National Forests. He resigned due to poor health and was appointed as a foreman of the Civilian Conservation Corps. In August 1937, he was assigned to Ten Sleep Camp F-35. About three weeks later, the Blackwater Fire was started by a lightning strike. Three days later, a cold front brought gusty winds. As a result, Saban and seven other men were trapped and killed in a draw. The lookout continued to be used to spot forest fires until 1972 when it was replaced by crewed aircraft and went into private ownership. The lookout was renamed for James Torrey Saban in 2015, by order of the Chief of the United States Forest Service.
