= Clayton Mountain =

Mountain in the American state of Wyoming

- Location within Wyoming Location within the United States

Highest point
- Elevation: 10,219 ft (3,115 m)
- Coordinates: 44°24′32″N 109°43′45″W

Geography
- Location: Park County, Wyoming, U.S.
- Parent range: Absaroka Range, Shoshone National Forest
- Topo map: USGS Clayton Mountain

Climbing
- Easiest route: Trails

Clayton Mountain (10,219 ft (3,115 m)) is located in the Absaroka Range in the U.S. state of Wyoming. On August 21, 1937, fifteen firefighters were killed on the west slopes of Clayton Mountain while fighting the Blackwater fire. The peak was named after United States Forest Service (USFS) ranger Alfred G. Clayton, who perished along with members of his crew during the fire. Two memorials were constructed in 1938 by the Civilian Conservation Corps (CCC) on the west slope of Clayton Mountain to commemorate the locations where members of the CCC and the USFS perished.
