= Ten Standard Firefighting Orders =

The Ten Standard Firefighting Orders are a set of systematically organized rules designed by a USDA Forest Service task force to reduce danger to personnel and increase fire fighting efficiency. They were introduced in 1957 and since then only the numbering changed, in order to make them easier to memorize.

The rules were based upon the success of the United States Armed Forces' General Orders for Sentries, a set of guidelines designed for safety and efficiency for military personnel standing sentry duty. The Ten Standard Orders were later supplemented by 18 Situations That Shout Watch Out, or the 18 Watchout Situations. While the original orders were designed to be implemented in an order of importance, the order was changed in the 1980s to remove this priority of orders and create an easy to remember list with each order beginning with an initial of "Fire Orders", then returned to the original order in 2002. A primary consideration for firefighters addressed by these orders is to be able to gain timely warning of a danger allowing the firefighter to safely escape.

The orders were developed from lessons learned in a number of major wildland fires that led to the deaths of trapped firefighters including the Shoshone National Forest Blackwater fire of 1937 and the Helena National Forest Mann Gulch Fire in 1949. The order can be a basis for evaluating the aftermath of a firefighting situation, although some firefighters have criticized the orders as being difficult to follow.

== Standard Firefighting Orders ==
1. Keep informed on fire weather conditions and forecasts.
2. Know what your fire is doing at all times.
3. Base all actions on current and expected behavior of the fire.
4. Identify escape routes and safety zones and make them known.
5. Post lookouts when there is possible danger.
6. Be alert. Keep calm. Think clearly. Act decisively.
7. Maintain prompt communications with your forces, your supervisor, and adjoining forces.
8. Give clear instructions and ensure they are understood.
9. Maintain control of your forces at all times.
10. Fight fire aggressively, having provided for safety first.
