= John Worland =

Australian rules footballer

Personal information
- Full name: John Worland
- Born: 17 January 1934
- Died: 7 April 2012 (aged 78)
- Original team: Winchelsea
- Height: 183 cm (6 ft 0 in)
- Weight: 84 kg (185 lb)

Playing career^{1}
Years	Club	Games (Goals)
1957	Geelong	4 (0)
- ^{1} Playing statistics correct to the end of 1957.

John Worland (17 January 1934 – 7 April 2012) was an Australian rules footballer who played with Geelong in the Victorian Football League (VFL).

From Winchelsea, Victoria, he was the younger cousin of Don Worland, who also played football for Geelong.
