= Sheep Mesa (Park County, Wyoming) =

Mesa in Park County, Wyoming

- Location within Wyoming Location within the United States

Highest point
- Elevation: 11,590 ft (3,530 m)
- Coordinates: 44°21′07″N 109°49′00″W

Geography
- Location: Park County, Wyoming, U.S.
- Parent range: Absaroka Range, Shoshone National Forest
- Topo map: USGS Sheep Mesa

Climbing
- Easiest route: Scramble

Sheep Mesa (11,590 ft (3,530 m)) is located in the Absaroka Range in the U.S. state of Wyoming. Sheep Mesa is at the south end of Blackwater Canyon and is at the head of the drainage for Blackwater Creek. Fortress Mountain is 1 mi (1.6 km) south of Sheep Mesa.
