= Don Worland =

Australian rules footballer (1932–2021)

Personal information
- Full name: Donald Lauder Worland
- Born: 8 June 1932
- Died: 24 June 2021 (aged 89)
- Original team: Winchelsea
- Height: 189 cm (6 ft 2 in)
- Weight: 96 kg (212 lb)

Playing career^{1}
Years	Club	Games (Goals)
1953	Geelong	4 (0)
- ^{1} Playing statistics correct to the end of 1953.

Donald Lauder Worland (8 June 1932 – 24 June 2021) was an Australian rules footballer who played with Geelong in the Victorian Football League (VFL).

From Winchelsea, Victoria, he is first cousins with John Worland, who also played for Geelong.
