= Fortress Mountain (Park County, Wyoming) =

Mountain in the U.S. state of Wyoming

- Location within Wyoming Location within the United States

Highest point
- Elevation: 12,090 ft (3,690 m)
- Prominence: 1,643 ft (501 m)
- Coordinates: 44°20′13″N 109°47′53″W

Geography
- Location: Park County, Wyoming U.S.
- Parent range: Absaroka Range, Shoshone National Forest
- Topo map: USGS Sheep Mesa

Climbing
- Easiest route: Scramble

Fortress Mountain (12,090 ft (3,690 m)) is located in the Absaroka Range in the U.S. state of Wyoming. Fortress Mountain is 1 mi (1.6 km) south of Sheep Mesa, a subpeak along the mesa that is 500 ft (150 m) lower in altitude. The headwaters of Cabin Creek are on the east slopes of Fortress Mountain, while those for Sheep Creek are on the northwest.

== Climate ==
Climate data for Fortress Mountain 44.3410 N, 109.7995 W, Elevation: 11,581 ft (3,530 m) (1991–2020 normals)
Month	Jan	Feb	Mar	Apr	May	Jun	Jul	Aug	Sep	Oct	Nov	Dec	Year
Mean daily maximum °F (°C)	19.1 (−7.2)	18.6 (−7.4)	23.8 (−4.6)	30.1 (−1.1)	39.2 (4.0)	48.7 (9.3)	58.9 (14.9)	57.9 (14.4)	48.7 (9.3)	35.7 (2.1)	24.4 (−4.2)	18.3 (−7.6)	35.3 (1.8)
Daily mean °F (°C)	10.4 (−12.0)	9.0 (−12.8)	13.6 (−10.2)	18.8 (−7.3)	27.6 (−2.4)	36.6 (2.6)	45.7 (7.6)	45.0 (7.2)	36.7 (2.6)	25.2 (−3.8)	15.7 (−9.1)	9.9 (−12.3)	24.5 (−4.2)
Mean daily minimum °F (°C)	1.7 (−16.8)	−0.5 (−18.1)	3.4 (−15.9)	7.5 (−13.6)	16.0 (−8.9)	24.5 (−4.2)	32.5 (0.3)	32.0 (0.0)	24.6 (−4.1)	14.7 (−9.6)	7.0 (−13.9)	1.4 (−17.0)	13.7 (−10.1)
Average precipitation inches (mm)	3.77 (96)	3.88 (99)	4.49 (114)	4.82 (122)	4.80 (122)	3.33 (85)	1.58 (40)	1.70 (43)	2.94 (75)	3.75 (95)	4.01 (102)	5.00 (127)	44.07 (1,120)
Source: PRISM Climate Group
