= Gus Worland: Marathon Man =

- Genre: Reality
- Presented by: Gus Worland and Hugh Jackman
- Starring: Gus Worland and Hugh Jackman
- Country of origin: Australia
- Original language: English
- No. of seasons: 1
- No. of episodes: 6

Production
- Production company: Mint Pictures

Original release
- Network: A&E
- Release: 9 May 2014 – present

Gus Worland: Marathon Man is an Australian reality television series which premiered on A&E on 9 May 2014.

== Development ==
The series was first commissioned by Foxtel (owner of A&E).
