= Worland Ranch =

Historic house in Wyoming, United States

- U.S. National Register of Historic Places
- U.S. Historic district
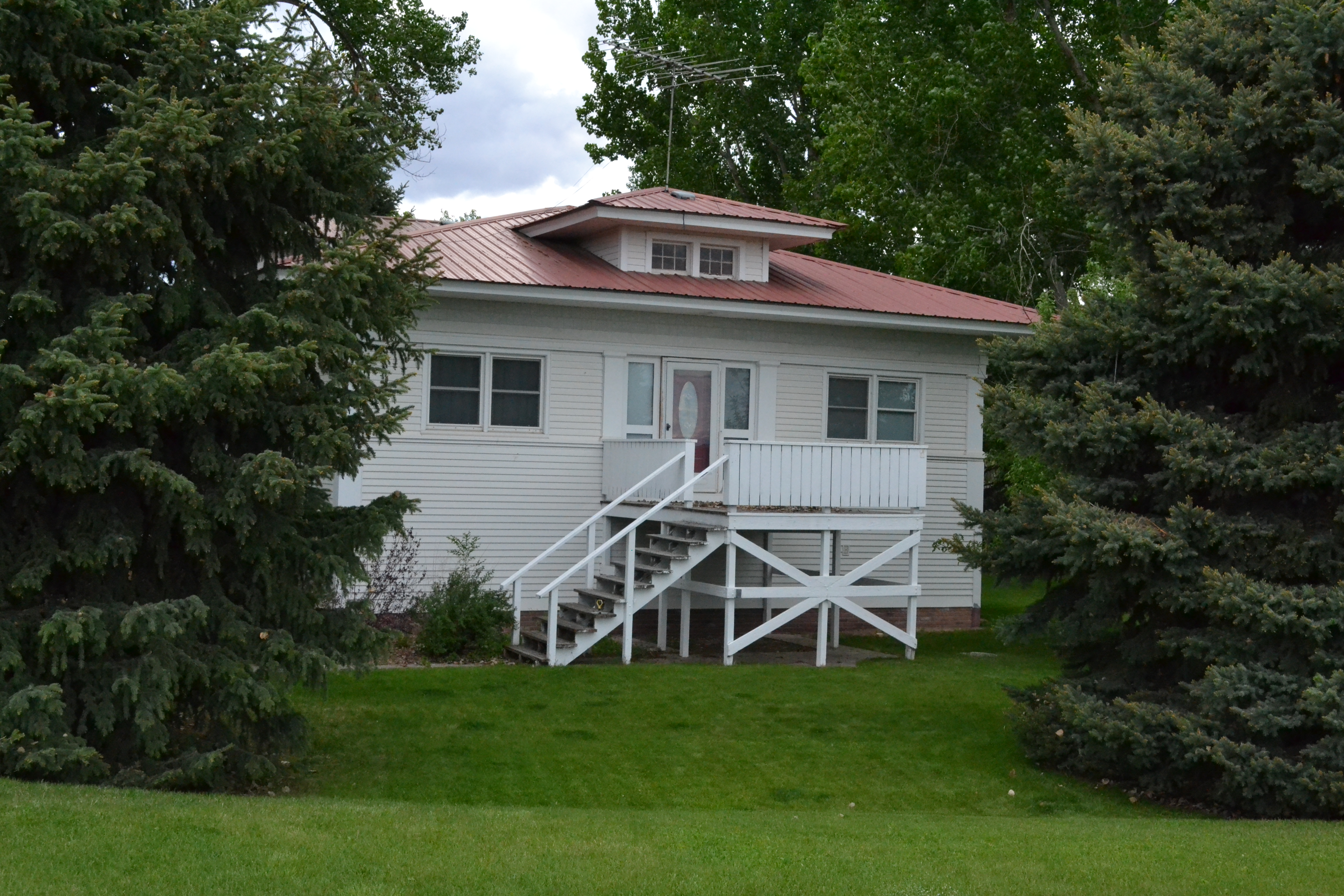
- The Worland Ranchhouse viewed from the east

- Location within Wyoming Location within the United States
- Location: 801 U.S. Route 20, Worland, Wyoming
- Coordinates: 44°00′41″N 107°58′51″W
- Area: 215.7 acres (87.3 ha)
- Built: 1900
- Architect: H.C. Shirk
- NRHP reference No.: 92000123
- Added to NRHP: March 05, 1992

The Worland Ranch is a historic district that includes the farmstead established in 1900 by C.F. "Dad" Worland near his namesake town of Worland, Wyoming, United States. The site was in fact the original townsite, with the Worland post office located on the grounds. The present town developed just to the east on the broad flatlands east of the Bighorn River. The original townsite is commemorated by an inscribed stone marker.

"Dad" Worland's 1900 dugout was the first structure in the vicinity. In 1903 a survey established that the Worland site was a promising location for irrigation, and the ranch became the center of construction activities. Worland built a two-room log house 1903–04 while assembling an eventual total of 800 acres (320 ha). By 1918 "Dad" Worland and his son Charlie had built the present ranch buildings. They sold the ranch to the Wyoming Sugar Company in 1920. The ranch has been preserved through its time as a working ranch and is still operated as a ranch.

The Worland House was listed on the National Register of Historic Places in 1992.

== See also ==
- Worland House
