= Worland House =

Historic house in Wyoming, United States

- U.S. National Register of Historic Places
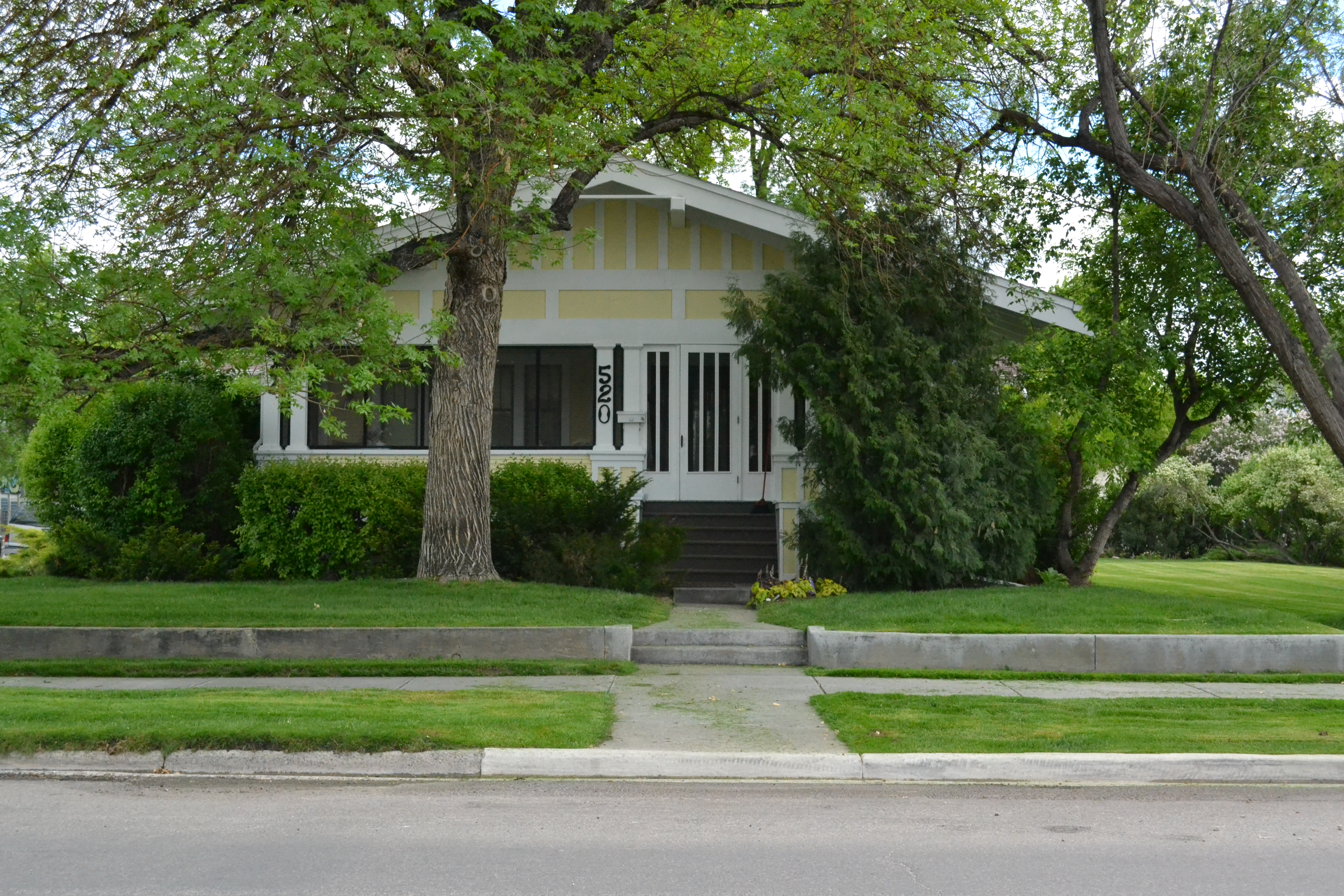

- Location within Wyoming Location within the United States
- Location: 520 Culbertson, Worland, Wyoming
- Coordinates: 44°0′52″N 107°57′42″W
- Area: less than one acre
- Built: 1917
- Architect: Shirk, H. C.
- Architectural style: Bungalow/Craftsman
- NRHP reference No.: 86000310
- Added to NRHP: February 27, 1986

The Worland House was built in 1917 in Worland, Wyoming, for local businessman Charlie Worland and his wife Sadie. Worland was the son of C. H. "Dad" Worland, the founder of the town of Worland, and was a noted local entrepreneur.

The house is a good example of the Bungalow style popular at the time. It was designed and built by local contractor H. C. Shirk. The house retains its architectural integrity and is the best example of its style in Worland. The house sits on a raised concrete block basement, fronted by a large porch, now enclosed. The entrance is offset from the center, under deep overhangs and a gable detailed with flat trim. The house extends deep into the lot, deeper than it is wide, with projecting small bays on either side and a rear enclosed porch addition. The interior retains its original detailing with stained oak trim and furnishings, including bookcases with leaded glass doors, flanked by Ionic columns as room dividers. Much of the kitchen is original.

The Worlands entertained extensively, holding dances in the basement for local young people. They sold the house in 1925 to G. C. Muirhead, the president of the Stockgrowers State Bank. The Muirhead family lived there until 1978.

The Worland House was listed on the National Register of Historic Places in 1986.

== See also ==
- Worland Ranch
