= Ten Sleep, Wyoming =

- Town
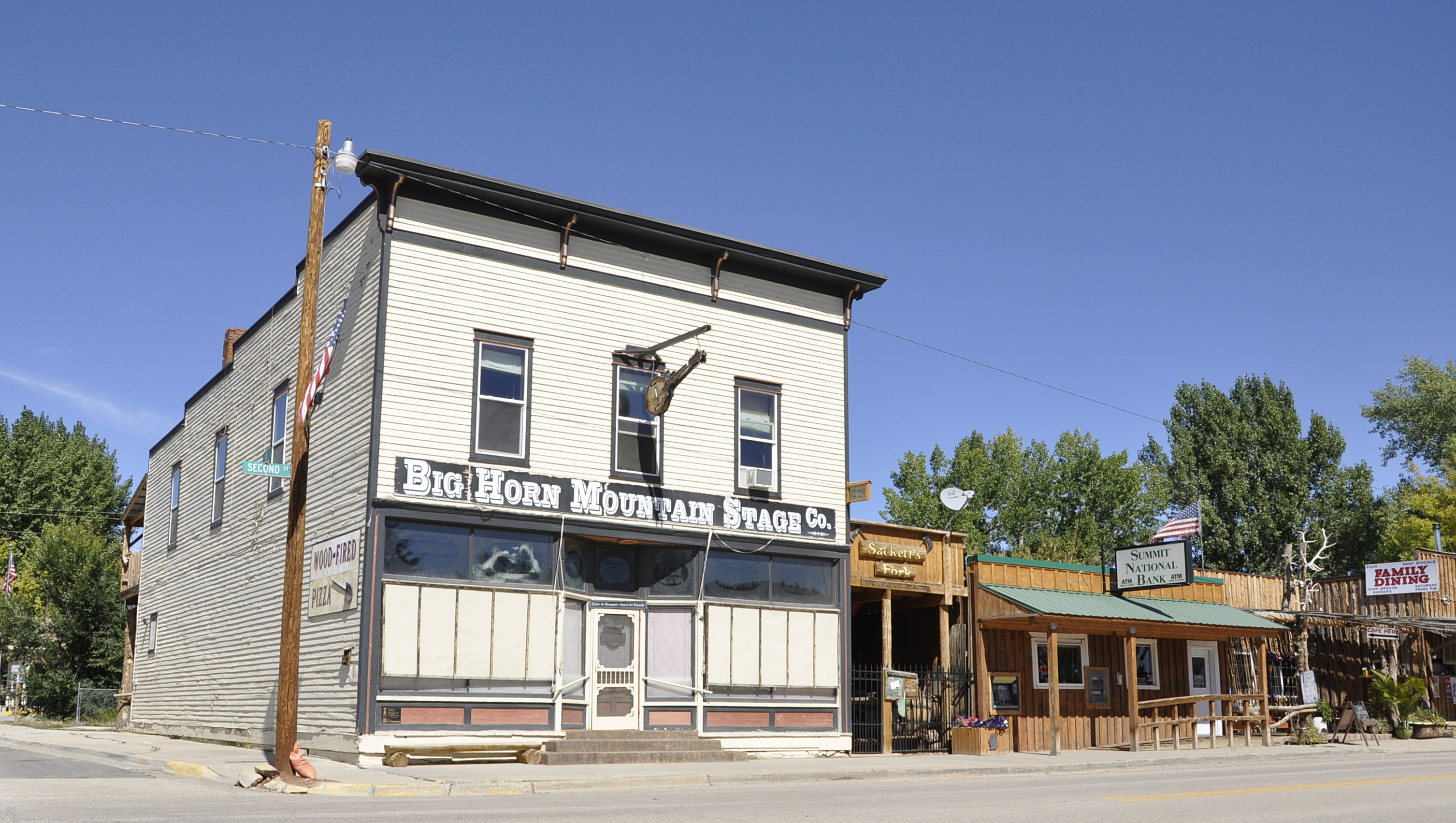
- Downtown Ten Sleep, September 2014

- Location of Ten Sleep in Washakie County, Wyoming
- Coordinates: 44°02′06″N 107°26′54″W
- Country: United States
- State: Wyoming
- County: Washakie

Area
  - Total: 0.18 sq mi (0.47 km^{2})
  - Land: 0.18 sq mi (0.47 km^{2})
  - Water: 0 sq mi (0.00 km^{2})
- Elevation: 4,433 ft (1,351 m)

Population (2020)
  - Total: 246
  - Density: 1,370/sq mi (528/km^{2})
- Time zone: UTC-7 (Mountain (MST))
  - Summer (DST): UTC-6 (MDT)
- ZIP code: 82442
- Area code: 307
- FIPS code: 56-75790
- GNIS feature ID: 2413373
- Website: http://www.townoftensleep.com/

Ten Sleep is a town in Washakie County, Wyoming, United States. It is located in the Bighorn Basin in the western foothills of the Bighorn Mountains, approximately 26 miles (42 km) east of Worland and 59 miles (95 km) west of Buffalo.

== Culture ==
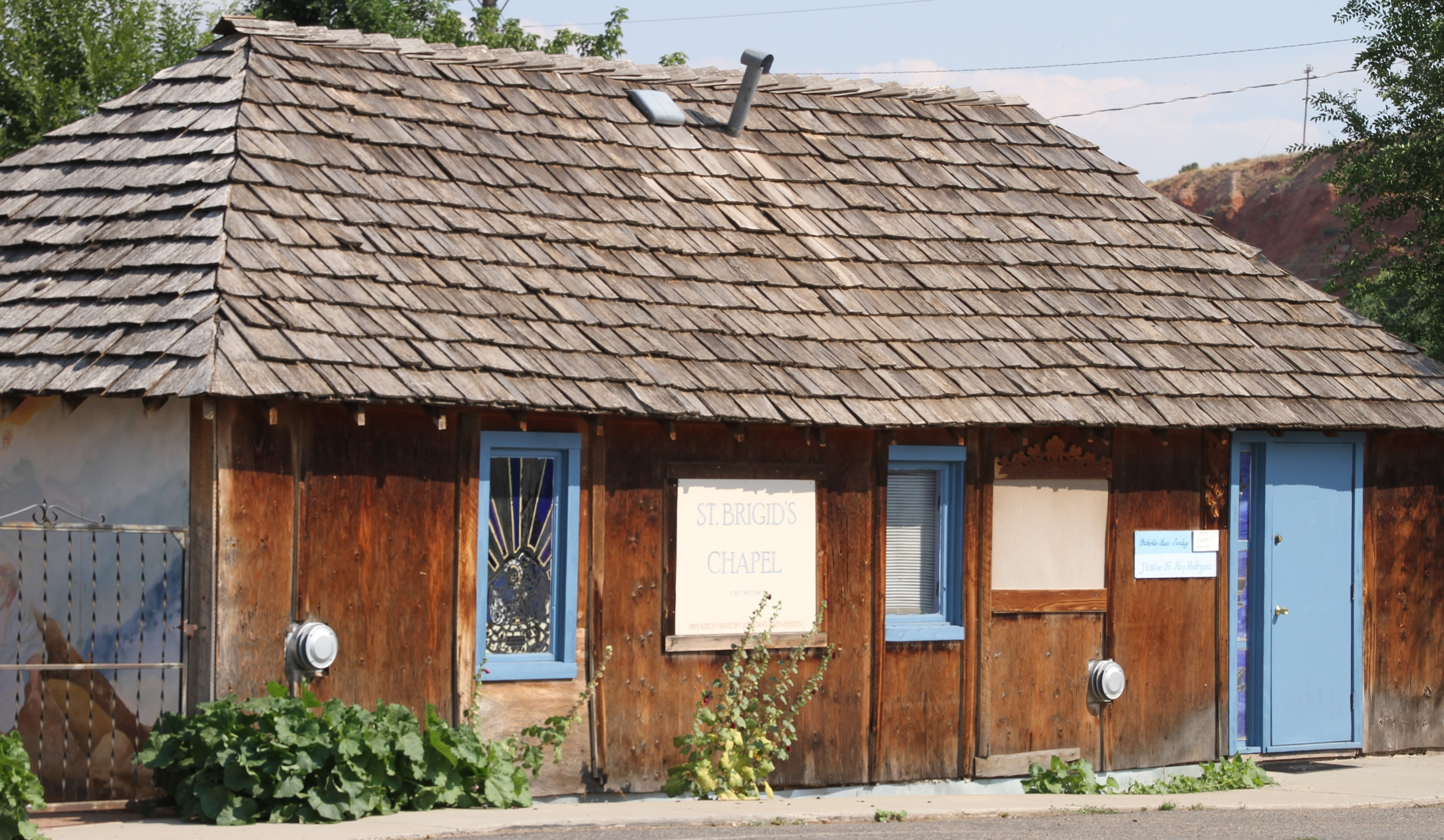
St. Brigid's Catholic Chapel in Ten Sleep, August 2017

Near the entrance to nearby Ten Sleep Canyon is the former site of the Girl Scout National Center West, a portion of which was one of the largest encampments in the world, at 15,000 acres (61 km^{2}). A part of that site is now owned and operated by the Nature Conservancy as the Tensleep Preserve, with facilities for workshops and seminars.

Ten Sleep Mercantile, also known as Ten Sleep Hardware, is an example of a typical small-town general store. It has been the focal point of the town since it was built in 1905 by H.T. Church. It is an example of the tall, narrow and deep commercial buildings commonly found in small American towns. From 1919 to 1943 the store was operated by Paul Frison, who served as mayor of Ten Sleep and as a Wyoming state legislator.

The area continues to thrive as a ranching community. Other industries include mineral extraction (bentonite) and tourism. Logging and other small businesses have dwindled, leaving just a handful of small businesses supporting the community. Three cafes/restaurants, two bars, two motels, a historic hardware store, a campground, a bank, and a gas station/convenience store offer the primary business services.

Annual celebrations include a two-day rodeo and parade, hinging on the 4th of July celebration of Independence Day of the United States. The main street is also closed to through traffic to accommodate events such as live music. Another annual tradition is NoWoodStock, a music festival held the second weekend of August.

Ten Sleep has a microbrewery, Ten Sleep Brewing Company, which began brewing in October 2013.

== Geography ==
According to the United States Census Bureau, the town has a total area of 0.18 square miles (0.47 km^{2}), all land.

=== Climate ===
According to the Köppen Climate Classification system, Ten Sleep has a hot-summer humid continental climate, abbreviated "Dfa" on climate maps. The hottest temperature recorded in Ten Sleep was 105 °F (41 °C) on July 13, 2005, while the coldest temperature recorded was −34 °F (−37 °C) on December 22, 1990. The rugged terrain supplies enormous temperature variability within a very small area, as the two weather stations closest to town demonstrate:

Climate data for Ten Sleep, Wyoming, 1991–2020 normals, extremes 1964–present
Month	Jan	Feb	Mar	Apr	May	Jun	Jul	Aug	Sep	Oct	Nov	Dec	Year
Record high °F (°C)	64 (18)	66 (19)	79 (26)	87 (31)	91 (33)	100 (38)	105 (41)	100 (38)	98 (37)	88 (31)	74 (23)	66 (19)	105 (41)
Mean maximum °F (°C)	52.7 (11.5)	54.5 (12.5)	66.7 (19.3)	76.2 (24.6)	83.9 (28.8)	92.2 (33.4)	96.8 (36.0)	95.0 (35.0)	90.6 (32.6)	79.9 (26.6)	64.9 (18.3)	54.3 (12.4)	97.4 (36.3)
Mean daily maximum °F (°C)	36.8 (2.7)	38.9 (3.8)	50.9 (10.5)	58.9 (14.9)	68.7 (20.4)	79.6 (26.4)	88.2 (31.2)	86.4 (30.2)	76.2 (24.6)	60.7 (15.9)	46.1 (7.8)	36.3 (2.4)	60.6 (15.9)
Daily mean °F (°C)	25.8 (−3.4)	28.1 (−2.2)	38.7 (3.7)	46.2 (7.9)	55.5 (13.1)	65.0 (18.3)	72.9 (22.7)	71.1 (21.7)	61.2 (16.2)	47.6 (8.7)	35.1 (1.7)	25.8 (−3.4)	47.8 (8.8)
Mean daily minimum °F (°C)	14.7 (−9.6)	17.2 (−8.2)	26.5 (−3.1)	33.6 (0.9)	42.2 (5.7)	50.5 (10.3)	57.5 (14.2)	55.7 (13.2)	46.3 (7.9)	34.6 (1.4)	24.1 (−4.4)	15.2 (−9.3)	34.8 (1.6)
Mean minimum °F (°C)	−6.3 (−21.3)	−2.3 (−19.1)	8.7 (−12.9)	20.8 (−6.2)	29.6 (−1.3)	39.1 (3.9)	48.2 (9.0)	44.9 (7.2)	33.5 (0.8)	19.4 (−7.0)	4.0 (−15.6)	−5.1 (−20.6)	−13.3 (−25.2)
Record low °F (°C)	−28 (−33)	−31 (−35)	−15 (−26)	5 (−15)	20 (−7)	31 (−1)	38 (3)	32 (0)	15 (−9)	−6 (−21)	−16 (−27)	−34 (−37)	−34 (−37)
Average precipitation inches (mm)	0.60 (15)	0.65 (17)	0.99 (25)	1.54 (39)	2.42 (61)	1.62 (41)	0.90 (23)	0.66 (17)	1.47 (37)	1.38 (35)	0.77 (20)	0.71 (18)	13.71 (348)
Average snowfall inches (cm)	9.0 (23)	9.5 (24)	5.7 (14)	5.4 (14)	1.1 (2.8)	0.0 (0.0)	0.0 (0.0)	0.0 (0.0)	0.3 (0.76)	3.5 (8.9)	7.6 (19)	9.5 (24)	51.6 (130.46)
Average precipitation days (≥ 0.01 in)	5.7	6.1	6.0	8.0	9.4	7.6	5.6	5.1	6.3	7.0	5.6	6.0	78.4
Average snowy days (≥ 0.1 in)	5.7	5.7	3.6	2.4	0.3	0.0	0.0	0.0	0.2	1.8	4.0	5.7	29.4
Source 1: NOAA
Source 2: National Weather Service

Climate data for Ten Sleep 16 SSE (located 16 miles SSE of town), 1991–2020 normals, 1959-2020 extremes: 4680ft (1426m)
Month	Jan	Feb	Mar	Apr	May	Jun	Jul	Aug	Sep	Oct	Nov	Dec	Year
Record high °F (°C)	61 (16)	66 (19)	77 (25)	85 (29)	92 (33)	100 (38)	103 (39)	103 (39)	97 (36)	88 (31)	76 (24)	65 (18)	103 (39)
Mean maximum °F (°C)	51.0 (10.6)	53.8 (12.1)	66.3 (19.1)	75.8 (24.3)	83.2 (28.4)	91.4 (33.0)	97.1 (36.2)	95.1 (35.1)	90.3 (32.4)	79.4 (26.3)	65.7 (18.7)	54.0 (12.2)	97.5 (36.4)
Mean daily maximum °F (°C)	34.0 (1.1)	36.4 (2.4)	46.9 (8.3)	55.0 (12.8)	64.8 (18.2)	76.4 (24.7)	86.2 (30.1)	84.2 (29.0)	72.7 (22.6)	58.0 (14.4)	45.0 (7.2)	34.7 (1.5)	57.9 (14.4)
Daily mean °F (°C)	17.4 (−8.1)	20.9 (−6.2)	32.9 (0.5)	41.1 (5.1)	50.9 (10.5)	61.0 (16.1)	69.0 (20.6)	66.3 (19.1)	55.4 (13.0)	42.4 (5.8)	29.5 (−1.4)	18.6 (−7.4)	42.1 (5.6)
Mean daily minimum °F (°C)	0.8 (−17.3)	5.3 (−14.8)	18.9 (−7.3)	27.2 (−2.7)	37.0 (2.8)	45.6 (7.6)	51.7 (10.9)	48.4 (9.1)	38.1 (3.4)	26.7 (−2.9)	14.0 (−10.0)	2.5 (−16.4)	26.4 (−3.1)
Mean minimum °F (°C)	−23.8 (−31.0)	−20.2 (−29.0)	−1.5 (−18.6)	13.5 (−10.3)	24.6 (−4.1)	34.2 (1.2)	42.9 (6.1)	38.7 (3.7)	26.9 (−2.8)	10.5 (−11.9)	−9.2 (−22.9)	−20.9 (−29.4)	−30.8 (−34.9)
Record low °F (°C)	−45 (−43)	−46 (−43)	−26 (−32)	−4 (−20)	17 (−8)	27 (−3)	31 (−1)	30 (−1)	12 (−11)	−22 (−30)	−32 (−36)	−51 (−46)	−51 (−46)
Average precipitation inches (mm)	0.59 (15)	0.73 (19)	1.12 (28)	1.70 (43)	2.31 (59)	1.45 (37)	0.97 (25)	0.76 (19)	1.25 (32)	1.45 (37)	0.83 (21)	0.81 (21)	13.97 (356)
Average snowfall inches (cm)	10.2 (26)	10.5 (27)	9.4 (24)	6.4 (16)	0.9 (2.3)	0.0 (0.0)	0.0 (0.0)	0.0 (0.0)	0.3 (0.76)	5.2 (13)	8.6 (22)	11.2 (28)	62.7 (159.06)
Source 1: NOAA
Source 2: XMACIS2 (records & monthly max/mins)

== History ==
Ten Sleep was an American Indian rest stop, so called because it was 10 days' travel, or “10 sleeps,” from Fort Laramie (southeast), Yellowstone National Park (west-northwest), and the Indian Agency on the Stillwater River in Montana (northwest). The archeological sites in the area feature artifacts such as arrowheads, pictographs and petroglyphs.

Ten Sleep was also the site of the Spring Creek Raid, one of the last feuds of the West's Sheep and Cattlemen's War. It was there in March 1909 that cattlemen attacked sheep herders and their flock, killing three men and shooting hundreds of the sheep.

=== Archaeology and geology ===
The region contains fossil specimens of dinosaurs, plants and sea-life. One such local area, Big Cedar Ridge, is open to the public for exploration and collection for personal use.

The Tensleep Formation is the yellowish-gray to white sandstone which features in much of Ten Sleep Canyon. Formed during the Pennsylvanian geological period, it features in the western slope of the Bighorn Mountains. Red sandstone such as Signal Cliff west of Ten Sleep, as well as the dirt hills of Bighorn's western slope compose the Chugwater Formation from the Triassic period. Above Chugwater is the marine Jurassic Sundance Formation and the terrestrial Late Jurassic Morrison Formation with dinosaurs. Called the "Painted Desert" or "Colored Hills" by locals, the Cloverly Formation is finely granulated sandstone and clay. The multicolor Cloverly formations are closely associated with strata containing dinosaur fossils. Numerous signs along U.S. 16 from Buffalo, through Ten Sleep and west to Worland identify the various geologic formations and their millennia.

== Demographics ==
Historical population
Census	Pop.	Note	%±
1940	345		—
1950	289		−16.2%
1960	314		8.7%
1970	320		1.9%
1980	407		27.2%
1990	311		−23.6%
2000	304		−2.3%
2010	260		−14.5%
2020	246		−5.4%

=== 2020 census ===
The 2020 United States census counted 246 people, 120 households, and 76 families in Ten Sleep. The population density was 1,344.3 per square mile (519.0/km^{2}). There were 146 housing units at an average density of 797.8 per square mile (308.0/km^{2}). The racial makeup was 97.56% (240) white or European American (97.15% non-Hispanic white), 0.0% (0) black or African-American, 0.81% (2) Native American or Alaska Native, 0.0% (0) Asian, 0.0% (0) Pacific Islander or Native Hawaiian, 0.41% (1) from other races, and 1.22% (3) from two or more races. Hispanic or Latino people of any race were 0.81% (2) of the population.

Of the 120 households, 28.3% had children under the age of 18; 47.5% were married couples living together; 24.2% had a female householder with no spouse or partner present. 30.8% of households consisted of individuals and 16.7% had someone living alone who was 65 years of age or older. The average household size was 1.9 and the average family size was 2.5. The percent of those with a bachelor’s degree or higher was estimated to be 20.3% of the population.

19.5% of the population was under the age of 18, 4.5% from 18 to 24, 18.7% from 25 to 44, 22.8% from 45 to 64, and 34.6% who were 65 years of age or older. The median age was 52.5 years. For every 100 females, there were 83.6 males. For every 100 females ages 18 and older, there were 83.3 males.

The 2016-2020 5-year American Community Survey estimates show that the median household income was $36,324 (with a margin of error of +/- $22,038) and the median family income was $66,786 (+/- $14,350). Males had a median income of $43,125 (+/- $31,607) versus $18,750 (+/- $12,426) for females. The median income for those above 16 years old was $25,000 (+/- $9,389). Approximately, 10.0% of families and 12.9% of the population were below the poverty line, including 39.5% of those under the age of 18 and 8.2% of those ages 65 or over.

=== 2010 census ===
As of the census of 2010, there were 260 people, 133 households, and 76 families residing in the town. The population density was 1,444.4 inhabitants per square mile (557.7/km^{2}). There were 157 housing units at an average density of 872.2 per square mile (336.8/km^{2}). The racial makeup of the town was 97.3% White, 0.8% Native American, 0.4% Asian, and 1.5% from two or more races. Hispanic or Latino people of any race were 0.8% of the population.

There were 133 households, of which 17.3% had children under the age of 18 living with them, 45.9% were married couples living together, 8.3% had a female householder with no husband present, 3.0% had a male householder with no wife present, and 42.9% were non-families. 36.8% of all households were made up of individuals, and 16.5% had someone living alone who was 65 years of age or older. The average household size was 1.95 and the average family size was 2.55.

The median age in the town was 54.3 years. 17.3% of residents were under the age of 18; 2.7% were between the ages of 18 and 24; 20.8% were from 25 to 44; 30.8% were from 45 to 64; and 28.5% were 65 years of age or older. The gender makeup of the town was 53.8% male and 46.2% female.

=== 2000 census ===
As of the census of 2000, there were 304 people, 142 households, and 83 families residing in the town. The population density was 1,789.7 people per square mile (690.4/km^{2}). There were 158 housing units at an average density of 930.2 per square mile (358.8/km^{2}). The racial makeup of the town was 99.01% White, 0.66% Native American, 0.33% from other races. Hispanic or Latino people of any race were 0.66% of the population.

There were 142 households, out of which 20.4% had children under the age of 18 living with them, 47.2% were married couples living together, 6.3% had a female householder with no husband present, and 41.5% were non-families. 38.7% of all households were made up of individuals, and 16.2% had someone living alone who was 65 years of age or older. The average household size was 2.14 and the average family size was 2.90.

In the town, the population was spread out, with 22.0% under the age of 18, 2.3% from 18 to 24, 19.4% from 25 to 44, 33.2% from 45 to 64, and 23.0% who were 65 years of age or older. The median age was 48 years. For every 100 females, there were 97.4 males. For every 100 females age 18 and over, there were 106.1 males.

The median income for a household in the town was $24,250, and the median income for a family was $30,357. Males had a median income of $28,125 versus $16,250 for females. The per capita income for the town was $15,761. About 2.8% of families and 7.0% of the population were below the poverty line, including 3.3% of those under the age of eighteen and 5.8% of those 65 or over.

== Education ==
Public education in the town of Ten Sleep is provided by Washakie County School District #2. Ten Sleep School, a K–12 campus, serves the town.

Ten Sleep has a public library, a branch of the Washakie County Library.

== Notable people ==
- Jalan Crossland, bluegrass singer, musician
- Gerald "Jerry" Geis, president of the Wyoming State Senate, 1985–1986

== See also ==
- List of municipalities in Wyoming
