= Tensleep Creek =

Stream in Washakie County, Wyoming

Coordinates: 44.0304°N 107.4620°W

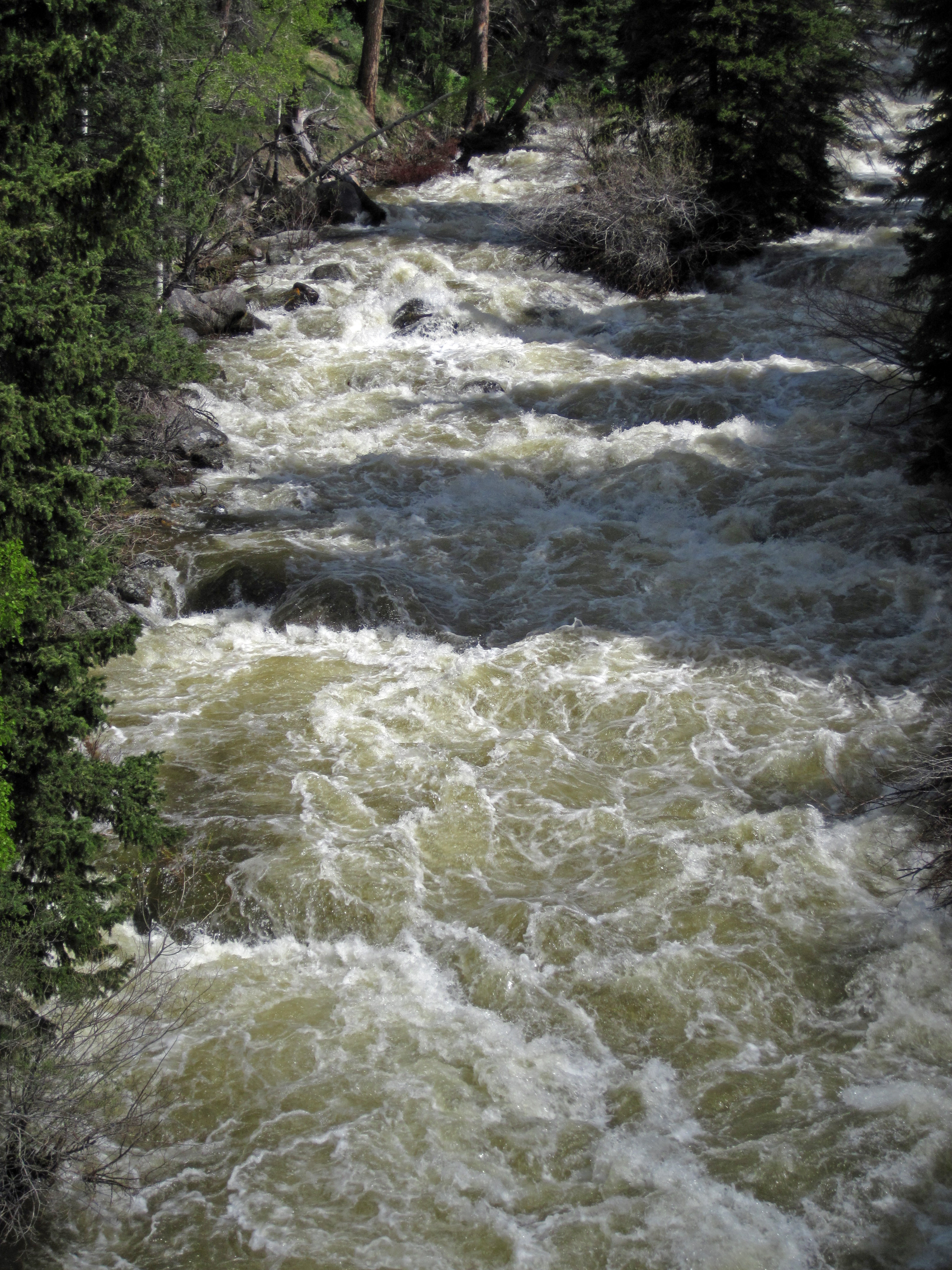
Tensleep Creek in Bighorn Mountains, June 2018

Tensleep Creek is a stream that originates in the Cloud Peak Wilderness Area in Washakie County, Wyoming, United States. The stream is 7.5 miles (12.1 km) in length. Lakes that are along the river are Misty Moon, Lake Marion and Lake Helen. Tensleep Creek is a tributary of the Nowood River which then flows into the Bighorn River.

== See also ==
- List of rivers in Wyoming
