= WRL =

WRL can stand for different things:

- Wairarapa Line service (timetable code: WRL), New Zealand
- Wales Rugby League, governing body for rugby league football in Wales
- War Resisters League, a secular pacifist organization in the United States
- Web Rule Language, a W3C member submission
- Windows Runtime Library, also known as the Windows Runtime C++ Template Library, a programming library for accessing COM on Windows.
- Woodlands Regional Library, a regional library in Woodlands, Singapore
- Worland Municipal Airport (IATA airport code), a public airport in Wyoming, U.S.
- The World Racing League, a fictional automobile racing league in the Speed Racer film adaptation
- WRL (file extension), a VRML file format for representing 3D vector graphics
- WRL Advertising in Canton Oh. Wern Rausch Locke are the original founders.
