= Nick Geis =

American politician

Member of the Wyoming Senate
- In office 1967–1971

Personal details
- Born: January 19, 1902 Creston, Iowa, U.S.
- Died: September 18, 1989 (aged 87)
- Party: Republican
- Children: 6; including Gerald Geis

Nicholas E. Geis (January 19, 1902 – September 18, 1989) was an American politician. He served as a Republican member of the Wyoming Senate.

== Life and career ==
Geis was born in Creston, Iowa, to Francis A. Geis and Catherine A. Geis. He went to school in Creston, Iowa, and O'Neill, Nebraska. He move to Gillette, Wyoming, in 1915 with his family and then to Buffalo, Wyoming, in 1922. He married Hazel I. Harvard in April 1925 and they lived in Ten Sleep, Wyoming, where he worked as for the Wyoming Highway Department. He started his own livestock haulage company which he ran from 1944 until 1966 and maintained part ownership until 1972.

In May 1966 he entered the race to represent Washakie County in the Wyoming Senate against fellow Republican Daniel F. Healy. Geis served in the Wyoming Senate from 1967 to 1971. He served on the Senate Ways and Means Committee for three terms.

He married his second wife Pauline M. Willard in April 1980.

Geis died on September 18, 1989, at the age of 87 in a retirement home in Wyoming. He was buried at the Riverview Memorial Gardens in Worland, Wyoming, and was survived by his wife, one daughter and five sons.
