= Airport Road =

Airport Road may refer to:

== Asia ==
- Airport Road in Chaklala, Rawalpindi, Pakistan
- Airport Road, a section of Andrews Avenue in Metro Manila, Philippines
- Airport Road, Dhaka, Bangladesh
- Airport Road metro station, Mumbai, India
- Baghdad Airport Road, Iraq
- D 89 road (United Arab Emirates) in Dubai, UAE
- Old Airport Road, Bangalore, India

== North America ==
- Airport Road, a section of Nevada State Route 525 in Carson City, Nevada, US
- Airport Road, Wyoming, an unincorporated community in Washakie County, Wyoming, US
- Airport Road (Huntsville), Alabama, US
- Airport Road (Ontario), Canada
- Nevada State Route 759, also known as Douglas County Airport Road
- Nevada State Route 796, in Humboldt County, Nevada, US
- Pennsylvania Route 987, formerly known as Airport Road, in Pennsylvania, US
- Veterans Memorial Parkway, formerly known as Airport Road, in London, Ontario, Canada
- Santa Clara Airport Road, in Santa Clara, Cuba

== See also ==
- Airport Boulevard (disambiguation)
- Airport Drive (disambiguation)
