= Winchester, Wyoming =

Unincorporated community in Washakie County, Wyoming, United States

- Census-designated place
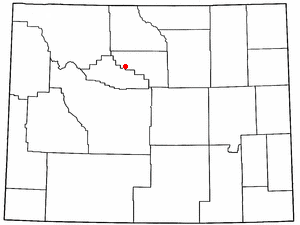
- Location of Winchester, Wyoming
- Coordinates: 43°54′17″N 108°05′30″W
- Country: United States
- State: Wyoming
- County: Washakie

Area
  - Total: 5.7 sq mi (14.8 km^{2})
  - Land: 5.5 sq mi (14.2 km^{2})
  - Water: 0.23 sq mi (0.6 km^{2})
- Elevation: 4,236 ft (1,291 m)

Population (2000)
  - Total: 60
  - Density: 11/sq mi (4.2/km^{2})
- Time zone: UTC-7 (Mountain (MST))
  - Summer (DST): UTC-6 (MDT)
- Area code: 307
- FIPS code: 56-83910
- GNIS feature ID: 2409608

Winchester is a census-designated place (CDP) in Washakie County, Wyoming, United States. The population was 60 at the 2000 census, when it was a census-designated place (CDP). The area is named for the post office established by postmaster and local rancher R. S. Winchester. Winchester objected to his name being used on the local railroad station, so the railroad named the station Chatham instead.

== Geography ==
According to the United States Census Bureau, in 2000 the CDP has a total area of 5.7 square miles (14.8 km^{2}), of which 5.5 square miles (14.1 km^{2}) is land and 0.2 square mile (0.6 km^{2}) (4.21%) is water.

== Demographics ==
As of the census of 2000, there were 60 people, 25 households, and 20 families residing in the CDP. The population density was 11.0 people per square mile (4.2/km^{2}). There were 25 housing units at an average density of 4.6/sq mi (1.8/km^{2}). The racial makeup of the CDP was 98.33% White, 1.67% from other races. Hispanic or Latino of any race were 1.67% of the population.

There were 25 households, out of which 20.0% had children under the age of 18 living with them, 68.0% were married couples living together, 4.0% had a female householder with no husband present, and 20.0% were non-families. 20.0% of all households were made up of individuals, and 4.0% had someone living alone who was 65 years of age or older. The average household size was 2.40 and the average family size was 2.65.

In the CDP the population was spread out, with 21.7% under the age of 18, 3.3% from 18 to 24, 26.7% from 25 to 44, 40.0% from 45 to 64, and 8.3% who were 65 years of age or older. The median age was 44 years. For every 100 females, there were 100.0 males. For every 100 females age 18 and over, there were 88.0 males.

The median income for a household in the CDP was $31,094, and the median income for a family was $31,094. Males had a median income of $31,250 versus $0 for females. The per capita income for the CDP was $17,274. None of the population or the families were below the poverty line.

== Education ==
Public education in the community of Winchester is provided by Washakie County School District #1. The district operates five campuses – East Side Elementary, South Side Elementary, West Side Elementary, Worland Middle School, and Worland High School.

== See also ==
- List of census-designated places in Wyoming
