= Washakie County School District Number 1 =

School district in Wyoming, United States

Washakie County School District #1 is a public school district based in Worland, Wyoming, United States.

== Geography ==
Washakie County School District #1 serves the western portion of Washakie County, including the following communities:

- Incorporated places
  - City of Worland
- Census-designated places (Note: All census-designated places are unincorporated.)
  - Airport Road
  - Mc Nutt
  - South Flat
  - Washakie Ten
  - West River
  - Winchester

== Schools ==
=== High school ===
- Grades 9-12
  - Worland High School

=== Middle school ===
- Grades 6-8
  - Worland Middle School

=== Elementary schools ===
- Grades K-5
  - East Side Elementary School
  - South Side Elementary School
  - West Side Elementary School

== Student demographics ==
The following figures are as of October 1, 2019.

- Total District Enrollment: 1,244
- Student enrollment by gender
  - Male: 626 (50.32%)
  - Female: 618 (49.68%)
- Student enrollment by ethnicity
  - White (not Hispanic): 903 (72.59%)
  - Hispanic: 300 (24.12%)
  - Asian or Pacific Islander: 4 (0.32%)
  - American Indian or Alaskan Native: 10 (0.80%)
  - Black (not Hispanic): 1 (0.08%)
  - Two or more Races: 26 (2.09%)

== See also ==
- List of school districts in Wyoming
