= Mc Nutt, Wyoming =

- Unincorporated community
- Location within the state of Wyoming Mc Nutt, Wyoming (the United States)
- Coordinates: 43°58′19″N 108°02′41″W
- Country: United States
- State: Wyoming
- County: Washakie

Area
  - Total: 24.7 sq mi (64.0 km^{2})
  - Land: 24.5 sq mi (63.4 km^{2})
  - Water: 0.23 sq mi (0.6 km^{2})

Population (2000)
  - Total: 278
  - Density: 11/sq mi (4.4/km^{2})
- Time zone: UTC-7 (Mountain (MST))
  - Summer (DST): UTC-6 (MDT)
- Area code: 307
- FIPS code: 56-49472
- GNIS feature ID: 2408803

Mc Nutt or McNutt is an unincorporated community in Washakie County, Wyoming, United States. The population was 278 at the 2000 census, when it was a census-designated place (CDP).

== Geography ==
According to the United States Census Bureau, in 2000 the CDP has a total area of 24.7 square miles (64.0 km^{2}), of which 24.5 square miles (63.4 km^{2}) is land and 0.2 square mile (0.6 km^{2}) (0.93%) is water.

== Demographics ==
As of the census of 2000, there were 278 people, 75 households, and 57 families residing in the CDP. The population density was 11.4 people per square mile (4.4/km^{2}). There were 82 housing units at an average density of 3.3/sq mi (1.3/km^{2}). The racial makeup of the CDP was 85.97% White, 1.08% African American, 1.08% Native American, 1.44% Asian, 5.76% from other races, and 4.68% from two or more races. Hispanic or Latino of any race were 8.99% of the population.

There were 75 households, out of which 29.3% had children under the age of 18 living with them, 69.3% were married couples living together, 4.0% had a female householder with no husband present, and 22.7% were non-families. 20.0% of all households were made up of individuals, and 4.0% had someone living alone who was 65 years of age or older. The average household size was 2.55 and the average family size was 2.97.

In the CDP the population was spread out, with 49.3% under the age of 18, 2.2% from 18 to 24, 16.5% from 25 to 44, 23.0% from 45 to 64, and 9.0% who were 65 years of age or older. The median age was 18 years. For every 100 females, there were 205.5 males. For every 100 females age 18 and over, there were 113.6 males.

The median income for a household in the CDP was $41,667, and the median income for a family was $41,667. Males had a median income of $25,357 versus $19,231 for females. The per capita income for the CDP was $9,887. About 16.2% of families and 25.8% of the population were below the poverty line, including 43.1% of those under the age of eighteen and 68.8% of those 65 or over.

== Government and infrastructure ==
The Wyoming Department of Family Services Juvenile Services Division operates the Wyoming Boys' School, located in Mc Nutt. The facility was operated by the Wyoming Board of Charities and Reform until that agency was dissolved as a result of a state constitutional amendment passed in November 1990.

== Education ==
Public education in the community of Mc Nutt is provided by Washakie County School District #1. The district operates five campuses – East Side Elementary, South Side Elementary, West Side Elementary, Worland Middle School, and Worland High School .
