= Wyoming Department of Health =

State agency of Wyoming

The Wyoming Department of Health (WDH) is a state agency of Wyoming. It has its headquarters in the Hathaway Building in Cheyenne.

== History ==
In November 1990 Wyoming voters approved a constitutional amendment that abolished the Wyoming Board of Charities and Reform. The institutions of the former state agency were divided and given to other agencies. The Department of Health took the Veterans’ Home of Wyoming, the Wyoming Pioneer Home, the Wyoming Retirement Center, the Wyoming State Hospital, and the Wyoming Training School.

== Divisions ==
Divisions of the department include:

- Administration
- Aging Division
- Community and Public Health Division
- Developmental Disabilities Division
- Health Advisory Council
- Institutional Review Board
- Mental Health and Substance Abuse Services
- Office of Healthcare Financing
- Preventive Health and Safety Division
- Rural and Frontier Health Division
- State Healthcare Facilities

== Facilities ==
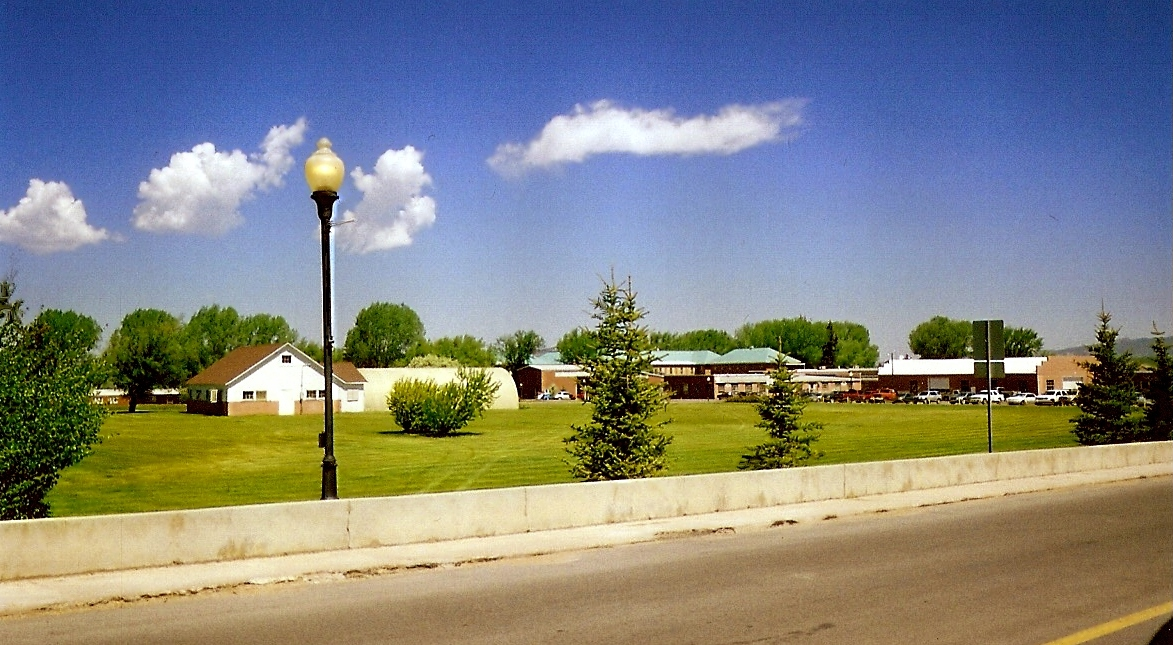
Wyoming State Hospital in Evanston

Health care facilities operated by the department include:

- Veterans' Home of Wyoming (Buffalo) - An assisted living facility for military veterans and their dependents
- Wyoming Pioneer Home (Thermopolis) - An assisted living facility for the elderly
- Wyoming Retirement Center (Basin) - A nursing home, it is located at the base of the Big Horn Mountains, along U.S. Highway 20. It is 10 miles (16 km) south of Greybull and 30 miles (48 km) north of Worland
- Wyoming State Hospital (Evanston) - A mental hospital
- Wyoming Life Resource Center (WLRC), originally the Wyoming State Training School (WSTS) (Lander) - A 90-acre (36 ha) residential facility for Wyoming residents with physical and mental disabilities that has been in operation since 1912.
