= South Flat, Wyoming =

- Unincorporated community
- Location within the state of Wyoming South Flat, Wyoming (the United States)
- Coordinates: 43°55′48″N 108°00′54″W
- Country: United States
- State: Wyoming
- County: Washakie

Area
  - Total: 22.2 sq mi (57.5 km^{2})
  - Land: 21.7 sq mi (56.2 km^{2})
  - Water: 0.50 sq mi (1.3 km^{2})
- Elevation: 4,186 ft (1,276 m)

Population (2000)
  - Total: 374
  - Density: 17/sq mi (6.7/km^{2})
- Time zone: UTC-7 (Mountain (MST))
  - Summer (DST): UTC-6 (MDT)
- Area code: 307
- FIPS code: 56-71765
- GNIS feature ID: 2408763

South Flat is an unincorporated community in Washakie County, Wyoming, United States. The population was 374 at the 2000 census, when it was a census-designated place (CDP).

== Geography ==
According to the United States Census Bureau, in 2000 the CDP has a total area of 22.2 square miles (57.4 km^{2}), of which 21.7 square miles (56.2 km^{2}) is land and 0.5 square mile (1.3 km^{2}) (2.25%) is water.

== Demographics ==
As of the census of 2000, there were 374 people, 133 households, and 109 families residing in the CDP. The population density was 17.2 people per square mile (6.7/km^{2}). There were 141 housing units at an average density of 6.5/sq mi (2.5/km^{2}). The racial makeup of the CDP was 83.42% White, 0.27% African American, 0.80% Native American, 13.10% from other races, and 2.41% from two or more races. Hispanic or Latino of any race were 17.91% of the population.

There were 133 households, out of which 41.4% had children under the age of 18 living with them, 69.9% were married couples living together, 4.5% had a female householder with no husband present, and 18.0% were non-families. 15.8% of all households were made up of individuals, and 7.5% had someone living alone who was 65 years of age or older. The average household size was 2.81 and the average family size was 3.11.

In the CDP the population was spread out, with 31.6% under the age of 18, 5.6% from 18 to 24, 26.7% from 25 to 44, 22.5% from 45 to 64, and 13.6% who were 65 years of age or older. The median age was 38 years. For every 100 females, there were 107.8 males. For every 100 females age 18 and over, there were 109.8 males.

The median income for a household in the CDP was $40,855, and the median income for a family was $40,855. Males had a median income of $31,635 versus $17,083 for females. The per capita income for the CDP was $14,693. About 10.9% of families and 7.7% of the population were below the poverty line, including 9.6% of those under age 18 and none of those age 65 or over.

== Education ==
Public education in the community of South Flat is provided by Washakie County School District #1. The district operates five campuses – East Side Elementary, South Side Elementary, West Side Elementary, Worland Middle School, and Worland High School .
