= West River, Wyoming =

- Unincorporated community
- Location within the state of Wyoming West River, Wyoming (the United States)
- Coordinates: 44°05′50″N 107°59′46″W
- Country: United States
- State: Wyoming
- County: Washakie

Area
  - Total: 57.6 sq mi (149.1 km^{2})
  - Land: 57.3 sq mi (148.3 km^{2})
  - Water: 0.31 sq mi (0.8 km^{2})
- Elevation: 4,078 ft (1,243 m)

Population (2000)
  - Total: 321
  - Density: 5.7/sq mi (2.2/km^{2})
- Time zone: UTC-7 (Mountain (MST))
  - Summer (DST): UTC-6 (MDT)
- Area code: 307
- FIPS code: 56-82677
- GNIS feature ID: 2409565

West River is an unincorporated community in Washakie County, Wyoming, United States. The population was 321 at the 2000 census, when it was a census-designated place (CDP).

== Geography ==
According to the United States Census Bureau, in 2000 the CDP has a total area of 57.5 square miles (149.1 km^{2}), of which 57.2 square miles (148.3 km^{2}) is land and 0.3 square mile (0.8 km^{2}) (0.54%) is water.

== Demographics ==
As of the census of 2000, there were 321 people, 113 households, and 96 families residing in the CDP. The population density was 5.6 people per square mile (2.2/km^{2}). There were 116 housing units at an average density of 2.0/sq mi (0.8/km^{2}). The racial makeup of the CDP was 93.46% White, 0.31% African American, 0.62% Native American, 4.67% from other races, and 0.93% from two or more races. Hispanic or Latino of any race were 8.41% of the population.

There were 113 households, out of which 37.2% had children under the age of 18 living with them, 77.0% were married couples living together, 2.7% had a female householder with no husband present, and 14.2% were non-families. 14.2% of all households were made up of individuals, and 3.5% had someone living alone who was 65 years of age or older. The average household size was 2.84 and the average family size was 3.11.

In the CDP the population was spread out, with 31.2% under the age of 18, 4.0% from 18 to 24, 30.2% from 25 to 44, 24.0% from 45 to 64, and 10.6% who were 65 years of age or older. The median age was 38 years. For every 100 females, there were 104.5 males. For every 100 females age 18 and over, there were 110.5 males.

The median income for a household in the CDP was $46,750, and the median income for a family was $48,125. Males had a median income of $43,438 versus $27,750 for females. The per capita income for the CDP was $19,238. About 17.4% of families and 15.2% of the population were below the poverty line, including 16.8% of those under age 18 and none of those age 65 or over.

== Education ==
Public education in the community of West River is provided by Washakie County School District #1. The district operates five campuses – East Side Elementary, South Side Elementary, West Side Elementary, Worland Middle School, and Worland High School.
