= Worland, Wyoming =

- City
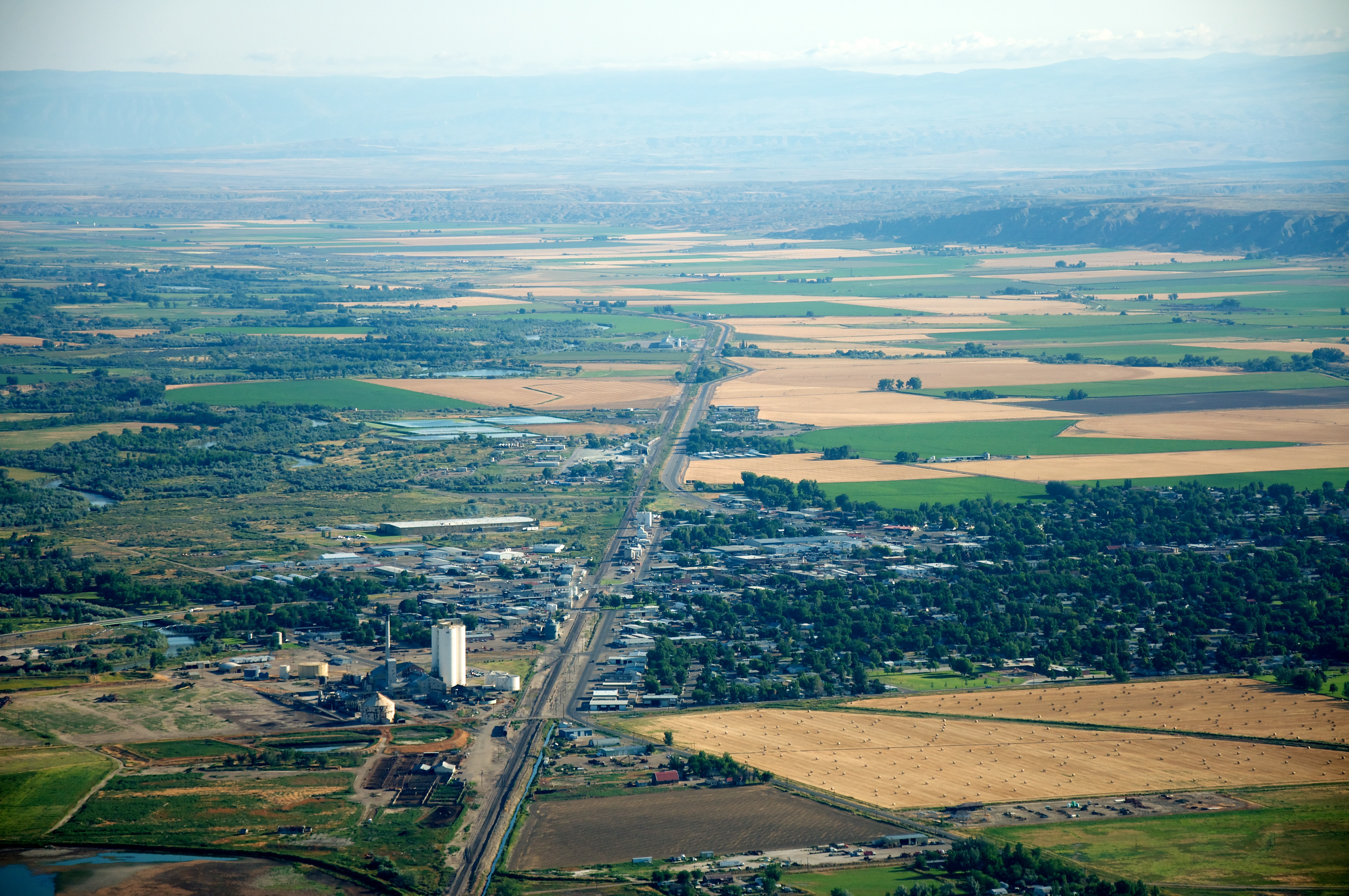
- Aerial view of Worland, August 2011

- Seal

- Location of Worland in Washakie County, Wyoming
- Coordinates: 43°59′30″N 107°57′05″W
- Country: United States
- State: Wyoming
- County: Washakie
- Settled: 1900
- Incorporated: 1906

Area
  - Total: 4.64 sq mi (12.02 km^{2})
  - Land: 4.59 sq mi (11.88 km^{2})
  - Water: 0.054 sq mi (0.14 km^{2})
- Elevation: 4,065 ft (1,239 m)

Population (2020)
  - Total: 4,773
  - Density: 1,095.3/sq mi (422.89/km^{2})
- Time zone: UTC−7 (Mountain)
  - Summer (DST): UTC−6 (Mountain)
- ZIP code: 82401
- Area code: 307
- FIPS code: 56-84925
- GNIS feature ID: 2412308
- Website: www.cityofworlandwy.gov

Worland is a city in Washakie County, Wyoming, United States. The population was 4,773 at the 2020 census, down from 5,487 at the 2010 census. It is the county seat of Washakie County. It is located within the Big Horn Basin and along the Big Horn River in northwestern Wyoming.

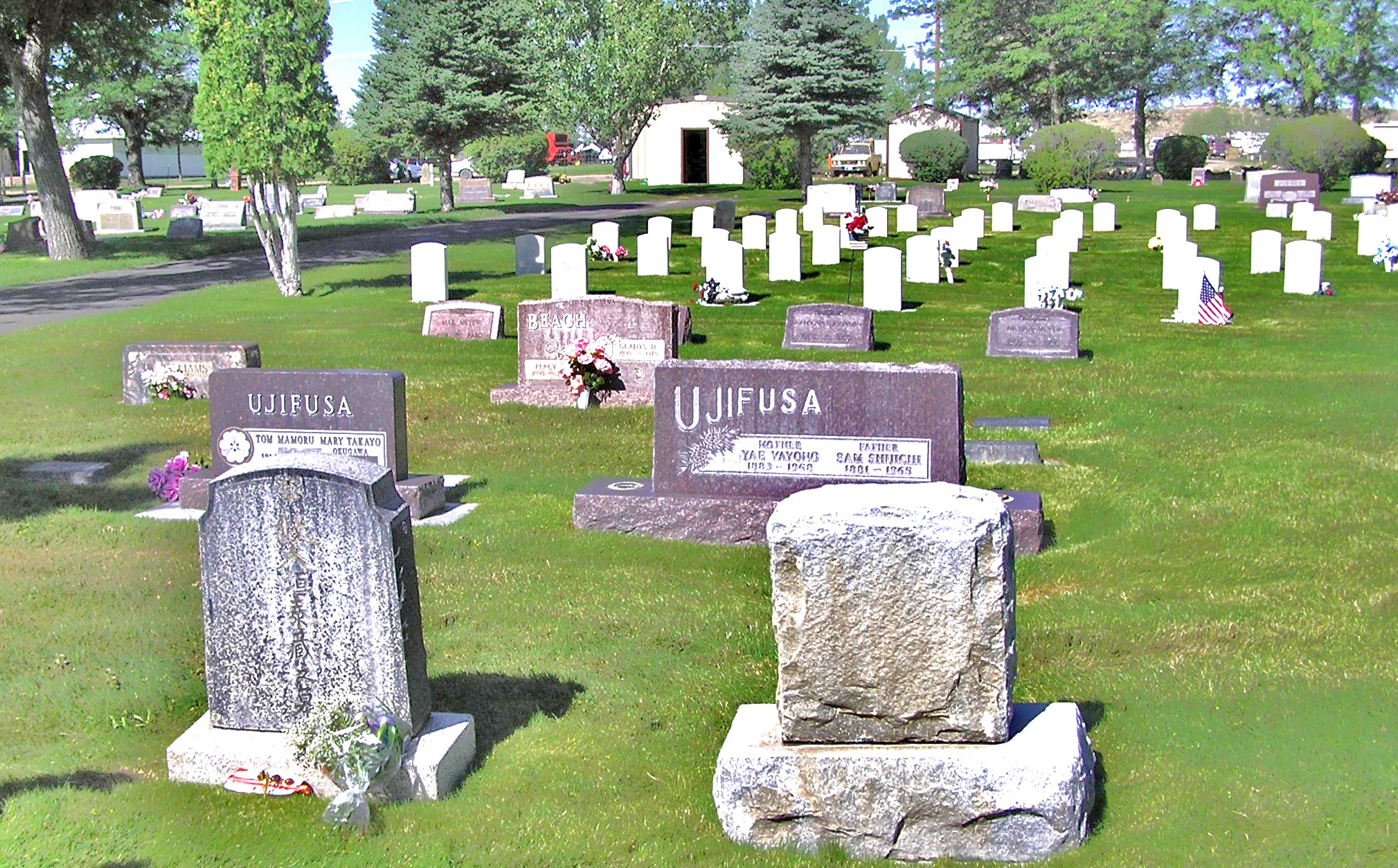
Worland City public cemetery, August 2004

== Geography ==
Worland is located on the Big Horn River, in the Big Horn Basin.

According to the United States Census Bureau, the city has a total area of 4.64 square miles (12.02 km^{2}), of which 4.56 square miles (11.81 km^{2}) is land and 0.08 square miles (0.21 km^{2}) is water.

=== Climate ===
Due to the location within the Big Horn Basin, it is protected from severe weather by the surrounding mountains from nearly every direction. This topography results in weather that is highly continental with frigid and dry winters, little wind, little rainfall and few storms. Worland is the least windy municipality located in the State of Wyoming.

Worland falls into USDA Hardiness Zone 4b.

According to the Köppen Climate Classification system, Worland has a cool semi-arid climate, abbreviated BSk on climate maps, although it borders on a cool arid climate (BWk). The hottest temperature recorded in Worland was 111 °F (43.9 °C) on July 13, 2026, while the coldest temperature recorded was −51 °F (−46.1 °C) on January 17, 1930, and February 9, 1936.

Climate data for Worland, Wyoming, 1991–2020 normals, extremes 1907–present
Month	Jan	Feb	Mar	Apr	May	Jun	Jul	Aug	Sep	Oct	Nov	Dec	Year
Record high °F (°C)	63 (17)	72 (22)	86 (30)	89 (32)	97 (36)	109 (43)	111 (44)	107 (42)	105 (41)	91 (33)	79 (26)	68 (20)	111 (44)
Mean maximum °F (°C)	48.5 (9.2)	54.0 (12.2)	71.0 (21.7)	80.9 (27.2)	88.7 (31.5)	98.0 (36.7)	102.3 (39.1)	100.3 (37.9)	95.1 (35.1)	82.5 (28.1)	65.8 (18.8)	51.7 (10.9)	103.0 (39.4)
Mean daily maximum °F (°C)	30.6 (−0.8)	36.8 (2.7)	51.1 (10.6)	60.2 (15.7)	70.0 (21.1)	81.6 (27.6)	91.2 (32.9)	89.0 (31.7)	77.1 (25.1)	61.1 (16.2)	44.8 (7.1)	32.1 (0.1)	60.5 (15.8)
Daily mean °F (°C)	17.2 (−8.2)	23.3 (−4.8)	36.8 (2.7)	45.9 (7.7)	56.2 (13.4)	66.2 (19.0)	73.9 (23.3)	71.2 (21.8)	60.2 (15.7)	46.4 (8.0)	31.3 (−0.4)	19.4 (−7.0)	45.7 (7.6)
Mean daily minimum °F (°C)	3.9 (−15.6)	9.8 (−12.3)	22.5 (−5.3)	31.5 (−0.3)	42.4 (5.8)	50.8 (10.4)	56.6 (13.7)	53.3 (11.8)	43.3 (6.3)	31.7 (−0.2)	17.9 (−7.8)	6.7 (−14.1)	30.9 (−0.6)
Mean minimum °F (°C)	−16.0 (−26.7)	−10.1 (−23.4)	3.9 (−15.6)	19.8 (−6.8)	30.6 (−0.8)	41.0 (5.0)	48.8 (9.3)	44.7 (7.1)	32.7 (0.4)	17.3 (−8.2)	−1.2 (−18.4)	−9.7 (−23.2)	−22.0 (−30.0)
Record low °F (°C)	−51 (−46)	−51 (−46)	−26 (−32)	−7 (−22)	18 (−8)	29 (−2)	36 (2)	32 (0)	12 (−11)	−11 (−24)	−28 (−33)	−44 (−42)	−51 (−46)
Average precipitation inches (mm)	0.28 (7.1)	0.28 (7.1)	0.47 (12)	0.94 (24)	1.80 (46)	1.13 (29)	0.69 (18)	0.44 (11)	1.03 (26)	0.84 (21)	0.46 (12)	0.22 (5.6)	8.58 (218.8)
Average snowfall inches (cm)	5.1 (13)	3.5 (8.9)	4.7 (12)	1.6 (4.1)	0.4 (1.0)	0.0 (0.0)	0.0 (0.0)	0.0 (0.0)	1.5 (3.8)	2.1 (5.3)	4.4 (11)	6.7 (17)	30.0 (76)
Average precipitation days (≥ 0.01 in)	4.7	5.0	5.2	7.5	9.8	7.6	5.8	4.8	6.2	6.3	5.1	4.7	72.7
Average snowy days (≥ 0.1 in)	4.4	3.4	3.5	1.4	0.4	0.0	0.0	0.0	0.5	1.3	3.4	5.1	23.4
Source 1: National Weather Service
Source 2: NOAA (average snowfall/snowy days 1981–2010)all-time extreme temperature

== Demographics ==
Historical population
Census	Pop.	Note	%±
1910	265		—
1920	1,225		362.3%
1930	1,461		19.3%
1940	2,710		85.5%
1950	4,202		55.1%
1960	5,806		38.2%
1970	5,055		−12.9%
1980	6,391		26.4%
1990	5,742		−10.2%
2000	5,250		−8.6%
2010	5,487		4.5%
2020	4,773		−13.0%

=== 2020 census ===
As of the 2020 census, Worland had a population of 4,773. The median age was 41.5 years. 24.3% of residents were under the age of 18 and 22.8% of residents were 65 years of age or older. For every 100 females there were 97.4 males, and for every 100 females age 18 and over there were 92.5 males age 18 and over.

98.0% of residents lived in urban areas, while 2.0% lived in rural areas.

There were 2,090 households in Worland, of which 28.7% had children under the age of 18 living in them. Of all households, 45.2% were married-couple households, 20.7% were households with a male householder and no spouse or partner present, and 28.8% were households with a female householder and no spouse or partner present. About 34.9% of all households were made up of individuals and 16.3% had someone living alone who was 65 years of age or older.

There were 2,454 housing units, of which 14.8% were vacant. The homeowner vacancy rate was 5.0% and the rental vacancy rate was 15.5%.

Racial composition as of the 2020 census
Race	Number	Percent
White	3,944	82.6%
Black or African American	6	0.1%
American Indian and Alaska Native	66	1.4%
Asian	22	0.5%
Native Hawaiian and Other Pacific Islander	3	0.1%
Some other race	313	6.6%
Two or more races	419	8.8%
Hispanic or Latino (of any race)	843	17.7%

=== 2010 census ===
As of the census of 2010, there were 5,487 people, 2,310 households, and 1,479 families living in the city. The population density was 1,203.3 inhabitants per square mile (464.6/km^{2}). There were 2,473 housing units at an average density of 542.3 per square mile (209.4/km^{2}). The racial makeup of the city was 89.9% White, 0.3% African American, 1.3% Native American, 0.6% Asian, 5.3% from other races, and 2.6% from two or more races. Hispanic or Latino of any race were 16.6% of the population.

There were 2,310 households, of which 29.6% had children under the age of 18 living with them, 49.7% were married couples living together, 9.9% had a female householder with no husband present, 4.5% had a male householder with no wife present, and 36.0% were non-families. 32.1% of all households were made up of individuals, and 13.6% had someone living alone who was 65 years of age or older. The average household size was 2.34 and the average family size was 2.95.

The median age in the city was 39.8 years. 25.2% of residents were under the age of 18; 7% were between the ages of 18 and 24; 23.5% were from 25 to 44; 26.5% were from 45 to 64; and 17.8% were 65 years of age or older. The gender makeup of the city was 48.5% male and 51.5% female.

=== 2000 census ===
As of the census of 2000, there were 5,250 people, 2,130 households, and 1,439 families living in the city. The population density was 1,274.1 people per square mile (492.0/km^{2}). There were 2,334 housing units at an average density of 566.4 per square mile (218.7/km^{2}). The racial makeup of the city was 89.47% White, 0.06% African American, 0.57% Native American, 0.84% Asian, 6.72% from other races, and 2.34% from two or more races. Hispanic or Latino of any race were 13.49% of the population.

There were 2,130 households, out of which 32.4% had children under the age of 18 living with them, 55.8% were married couples living together, 9.2% had a female householder with no husband present, and 32.4% were non-families. 29.2% of all households were made up of individuals, and 13.8% had someone living alone who was 65 years of age or older. The average household size was 2.41 and the average family size was 3.00.

In the city, the population was spread out, with 26.2% under the age of 18, 7.5% from 18 to 24, 25.3% from 25 to 44, 23.8% from 45 to 64, and 17.3% who were 65 years of age or older. The median age was 39 years. For every 100 females, there were 92.7 males. For every 100 females age 18 and over, there were 91.3 males.

The median income for a household in the city was $31,447, and the median income for a family was $42,453. Males had a median income of $31,411 versus $20,777 for females. The per capita income for the city was $17,208. About 9.7% of families and 15.4% of the population were below the poverty line, including 22.4% of those under age 18 and 15.6% of those age 65 or over.

== Government and infrastructure ==
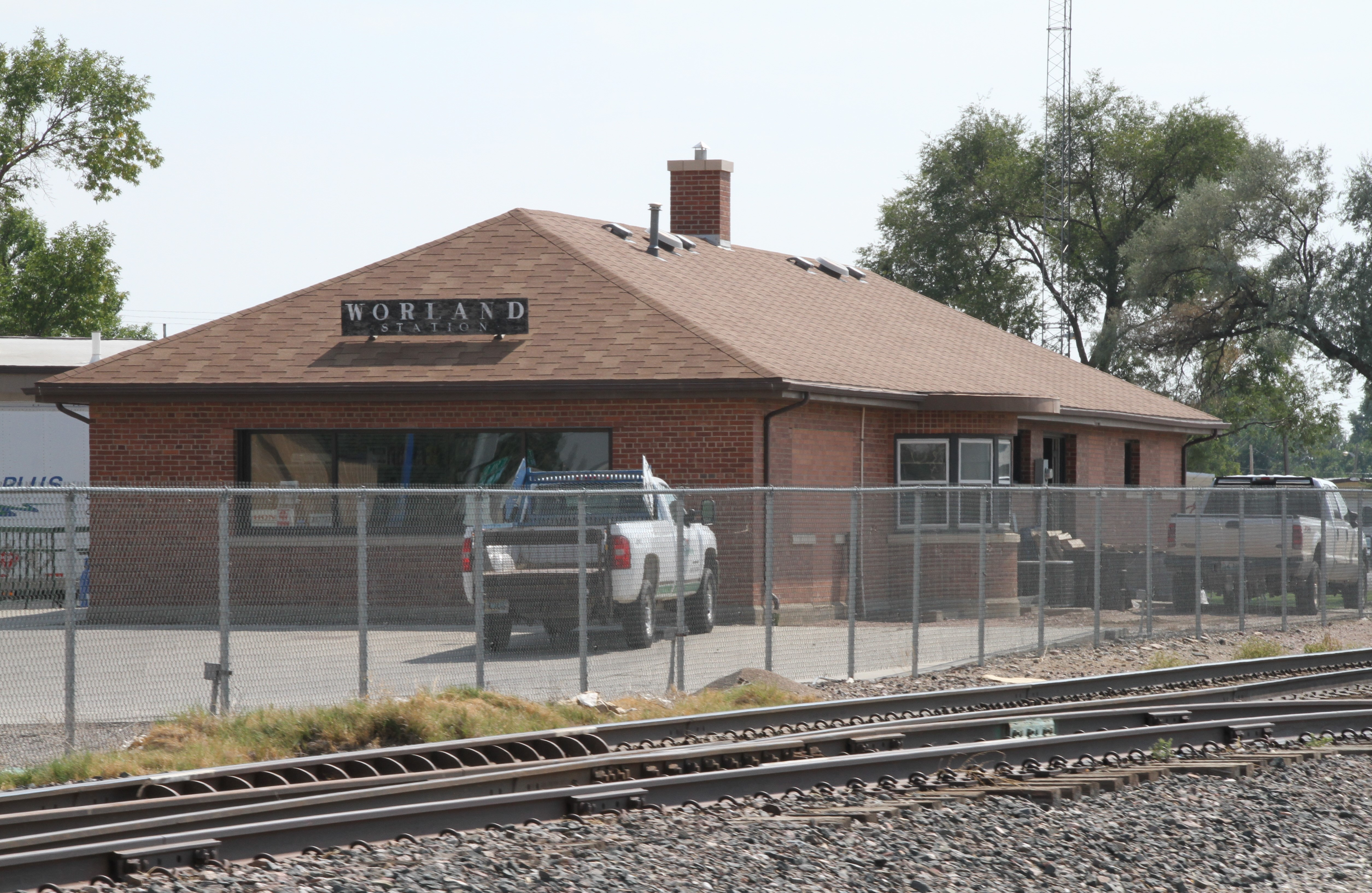
Worland Station, August 2017

The United States Postal Service operates the Worland Post Office.

The Wyoming Department of Family Services Juvenile Services Division operates the Wyoming Boys' School, located in Mc Nutt, unincorporated Washakie County, near Worland. The facility was operated by the Wyoming Board of Charities and Reform until that agency was dissolved as a result of a state constitutional amendment passed in November 1990.

Although the Washington bill was narrowly defeated, similar legislation succeeded elsewhere, and Wyoming Territory was the first to give women the vote in 1869, quickly followed by Utah Territory (1870) and Washington Territory (1883). As with Wyoming, when these territories became states they preserved women's suffrage.

== Economy ==
Worland is a hub for business in the Big Horn Basin. The economy of Worland is supported by agriculture and oil and gas drilling. Sugar beets are the top agricultural product of the area. Top employers in Worland include Admiral Beverage, Wyoming Sugar Company, Crown Cork & Seal, and MillerCoors.

== Education ==
Public education in the city of Worland is provided by Washakie County School District #1. The district operates five campuses – East Side Elementary, South Side Elementary, West Side Elementary, Worland Middle School, and Worland High School.

Worland has a public library, a branch of the Washakie County Library.

== Transportation ==
The city of Worland is served by Worland Municipal Airport. As of 2026, there is no commercial flight service to Worland.

The city is also served by U.S. Route 20 to the south, U.S. Route 16 to the east, and the combined US highways 20/16 to the north.

Worland Senior Center also provides a demand response service on weekdays and Sundays.

Intercity bus service to the city is provided by Express Arrow.

== See also ==
- List of municipalities in Wyoming
- Alexander Healy (sheepman)
