= Worland Municipal Airport =

- IATA: WRL; ICAO: KWRL; FAA LID: WRL

Summary
- Airport type: Public
- Owner: City of Worland
- Operator: City of Worland
- Serves: Worland, Wyoming
- Elevation AMSL: 4,252 ft / 1,296 m
- Coordinates: 43°57′46″N 107°57′02″W
- Website: http://cityofworland.org/index.asp?Type=B_BASIC&SEC={2EFBF9CC-2F62-4406-AAB9-F961C258ACC4

Map

Runways
Direction	Length		Surface
Direction	ft	m	Surface
16/34	7,000	2,134	Asphalt
10/28	2,502	763	Turf
4/22	2,241	683	Turf

Statistics (2021)
- Aircraft operations (year ending 6/30/2021): 3,060
- Based Aircraft: 15
- Source: Federal Aviation Administration

Worland Municipal Airport (IATA: WRL, ICAO: KWRL, FAA LID: WRL) is in Washakie County, Wyoming, three miles south of Worland, which owns it. It was built in 1953. It has no scheduled airline service; Great Lakes Airlines pulled out on September 30, 2016.

Federal Aviation Administration records say the airport had 2,996 passenger boardings (enplanements) in calendar year 2008, 2,650 in 2009 and 2,737 in 2010. The National Plan of Integrated Airport Systems for 2011–2015 categorized it as a non-primary commercial service airport (between 2,500 and 10,000 enplanements per year).

== Facilities ==
The airport covers 690 acres (279 ha) at an elevation of 4,252 feet (1,296 m). It has three runways: 16/34 is 7,000 by 100 feet (2,134 x 30 m) asphalt, 10/28 is 2,502 by 60 feet (763 x 18 m) turf and 4/22 is 2,241 by 60 feet (683 x 18 m) turf.

In the 12 months ending June 30, 2021, the airport had 3,060 aircraft operations, average 59 per week: 70% general aviation, 29% air taxi, and <1% military. 15 aircraft were then based at the airport: 6 single-engine, 1 jet, and 8 helicopter.

== See also ==
- List of airports in Wyoming

== Other sources ==
- Essential Air Service documents (Docket OST-1997-2981) from the U.S. Department of Transportation:
  - Order 2000-5-14 (May 11, 2000): tentatively reselecting Great Lakes Aviation to provide essential air service at Laramie, Rock Springs and Worland, Wyoming, for the two years from May 1, 2000 – April 30, 2002, at an annual subsidy of $297,633, for Laramie, $465,023, for Rock Springs, and $353,345 for Worland.
  - Order 2002-7-20 (July 11, 2002): extends the interim subsidy rates of Great Lakes Aviation, Ltd. at each of the communities listed (Page, AZ; Alamosa, CO; Pueblo, CO; Ironwood, MI/Ashland, WI; McCook, NE; Laramie, WY; Rock Springs, WY; Worland, WY; Moab, UT; Vernal, UT).
  - Order 2004-7-16 (July 20, 2004): selects Great Lakes Aviation, Ltd., to provide essential air service with 19-passenger B1900D aircraft at Laramie, Riverton, Rock Springs, and Worland, Wyoming, for two years for annual subsidy rates of $397,400, $394,046, $390,488, and $797,844, respectively.
  - Order 2006-9-9 (September 11, 2006): re-selecting Great Lakes Aviation, Ltd., operating as both a United Airlines and Frontier code-share partner, to provide subsidized essential air service (EAS) at Laramie and Worland, Wyoming, at an annual subsidy rate of $487,516 for Laramie and $972,757 for Worland, for the two years of October 1, 2006, through September 30, 2008.
  - Order 2008-7-3 (July 1, 2008): re-selecting Great Lakes Aviation, Ltd., operating as both a United Airlines and Frontier Airlines code-share partner, to provide subsidized essential air service (EAS) at Laramie and Worland, Wyoming, at an annual subsidy rate of $1,215,603 for Laramie and $1,735,814 for Worland, for the two years of October 1, 2008, through September 30, 2010.
  - Order 2010-8-10 (August 18, 2010): selecting Great Lakes Aviation, Ltd., operating as both a United Airlines and Frontier Airlines code share partner, to provide essential air service (EAS) at Laramie and Worland, for a combined annual subsidy of $2,951,908, for the two years from October 1, 2010, to September 30, 2012.
