= Airport Drive =

Airport Drive may refer to:

== Highways ==
- Airport Drive (Melbourne), Australia
- Airport Drive (Perth), Australia
- Virginia State Route 156 and Virginia State Route 281, both part of the same stretch of road named Airport Drive

== Towns ==
- Airport Drive, Missouri, United States, a village

== See also ==
- Airport Boulevard (disambiguation)
- Airport Road (disambiguation)
