= Airport Boulevard =

Airport Boulevard may refer to:

- Airport Boulevard (Mobile, Alabama)
- Airport Boulevard (Pensacola, Florida), also known as Florida State Road 750
- Airport Boulevard (Sanford, Florida), also known as U.S. Route 92
- Airport Boulevard (Austin, Texas), also known as Texas State Highway Loop 111
- Airport Boulevard (Houston, Texas)
- "Airport Boulevard", a song by Yawning Man, 2005 and 2007

== See also ==
- Airport Road (disambiguation)
- Airport Drive (disambiguation)
