= Wyoming Department of Family Services =

State agency of Wyoming

Agency overview
- Headquarters: Wyoming
- Website: dfsweb.wyo.gov

The Wyoming Department of Family Services is a state agency of Wyoming, headquartered on the third floor of the Hathaway Building in Cheyenne.

The Social Services Division is responsible for managing cases involving abuse, neglect or exploitation of children and vulnerable adults. The division also manages juvenile probation and the state's two training schools, or juvenile correctional facilities, for youth. The division's two juvenile facilities are the Wyoming Boys' School in Mc Nutt, unincorporated Washakie County, near Worland, and the Wyoming Girls' School in unincorporated Sheridan County, near Sheridan.

== History ==
In November 1990 Wyoming voters approved a constitutional amendment that abolished the Wyoming State Board of Charities and Reform. The institutions of the former state agency were divided and given to other agencies; the Department of Family Services received the boys' and girls' schools and the Youth Treatment Center (originally the Wyoming Children's Home) in Casper. The Wyoming Legislature stopped funding the youth treatment centre, which closed on July 1, 1996.
