= Airport Road, Wyoming =

- Unincorporated community
- Location within the state of Wyoming Airport Road, Wyoming (the United States)
- Coordinates: 43°59′45″N 107°56′50″W
- Country: United States
- State: Wyoming
- County: Washakie

Area
  - Total: 3.7 sq mi (9.7 km^{2})
  - Land: 3.7 sq mi (9.7 km^{2})
  - Water: 0 sq mi (0.0 km^{2})
- Elevation: 4,121 ft (1,256 m)

Population (2000)
  - Total: 297
  - Density: 80/sq mi (30.7/km^{2})
- Time zone: UTC-7 (Mountain (MST))
  - Summer (DST): UTC-6 (MDT)
- Area code: 307
- FIPS code: 56-00417
- GNIS feature ID: 2407703

Airport Road is an unincorporated community in Washakie County, Wyoming, United States. The population was 297 at the 2000 census, when it was a census-designated place (CDP).

== Geography ==
According to the United States Census Bureau, in 2000 the CDP has a total area of 3.7 square miles (9.7 km^{2}), all land.

== Demographics ==
As of the census of 2000, there were 297 people, 110 households, and 85 families residing in the CDP. The population density was 79.6 people per square mile (30.7/km^{2}). There were 114 housing units at an average density of 30.6/sq mi (11.8/km^{2}). The racial makeup of the CDP was 89.56% White, 0.34% African American, 7.07% from other races, and 3.03% from two or more races. Hispanic or Latino of any race were 12.79% of the population.

There were 110 households, out of which 33.6% had children under the age of 18 living with them, 71.8% were married couples living together, 1.8% had a female householder with no husband present, and 22.7% were non-families. 20.0% of all households were made up of individuals, and 8.2% had someone living alone who was 65 years of age or older. The average household size was 2.70 and the average family size was 3.15.

In the CDP the population was spread out, with 26.3% under the age of 18, 6.7% from 18 to 24, 21.2% from 25 to 44, 29.0% from 45 to 64, and 16.8% who were 65 years of age or older. The median age was 43 years. For every 100 females, there were 91.6 males. For every 100 females age 18 and over, there were 99.1 males.

The median income for a household in the CDP was $66,806, and the median income for a family was $80,221. Males had a median income of $31,042 versus $20,458 for females. The per capita income for the CDP was $27,891. None of the population or families were below the poverty line.

== Education ==
Public education in the community of Airport Road is provided by Washakie County School District #1. The district operates five campuses – East Side Elementary, South Side Elementary, West Side Elementary, Worland Middle School, and Worland High School .
