= Airport Road (Huntsville) =

Road in Huntsville, Alabama

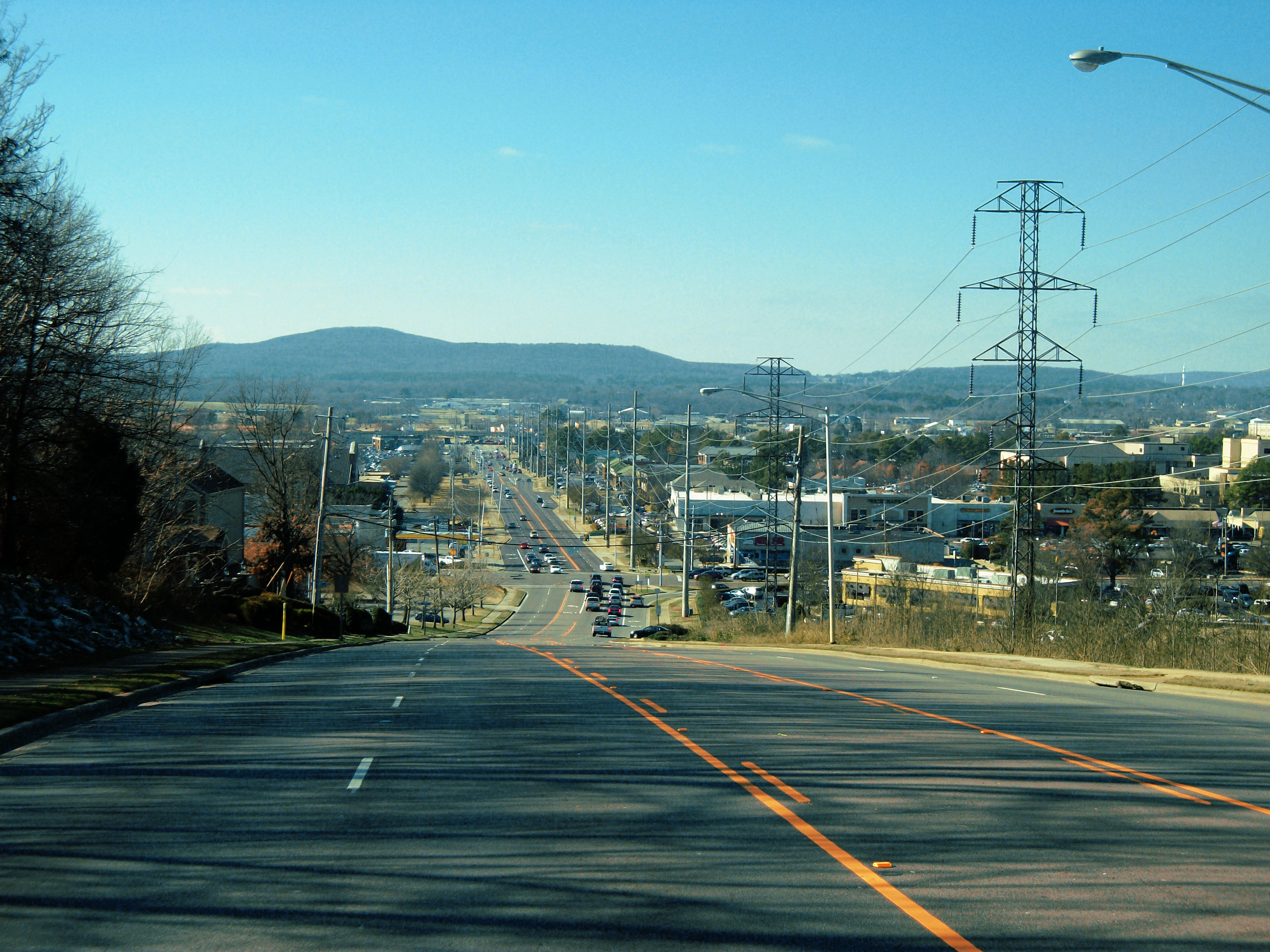
- Length: 1.9 mi (3.1 km)
- Location: Huntsville, Alabama
- West end: Leeman Ferry Road SW
- Major junctions: Memorial Parkway
- East end: Carl T. Jones Drive SE

Airport Road is a major east–west thoroughfare in Huntsville, Alabama that connects the Jones Valley and Hampton Cove subdivisions to Memorial Parkway and the rest of the city. On average approximately 32,000 vehicles travel the 2-mile stretch of road a day.

== Street description ==
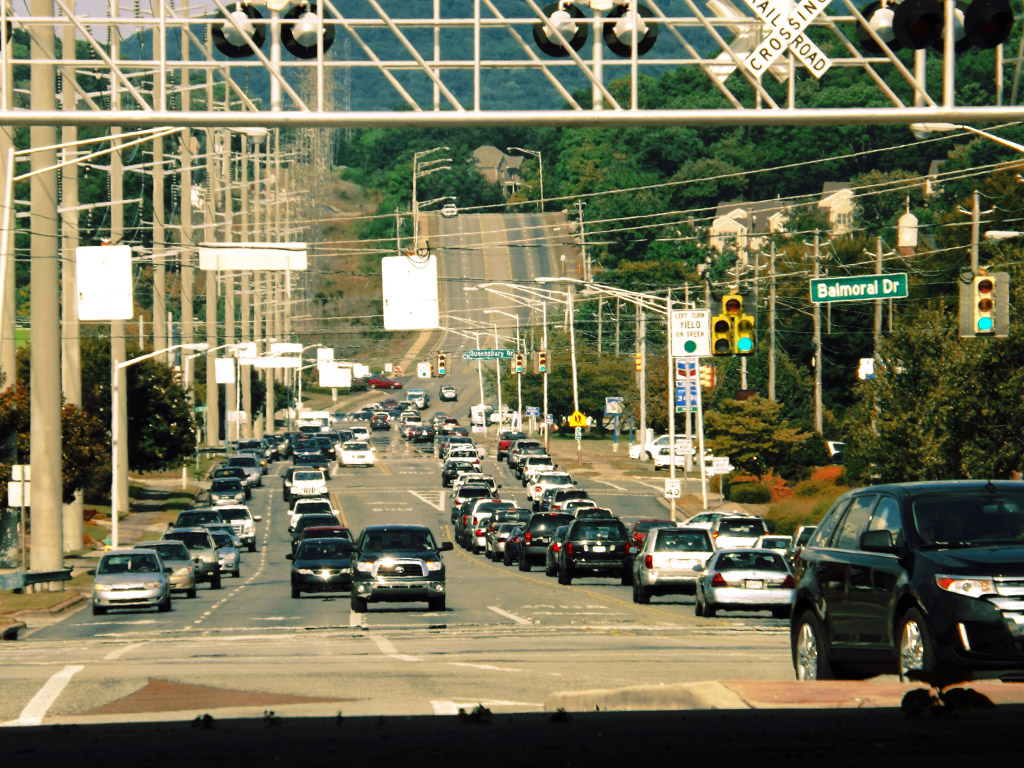
Looking up Airport Road from Memorial Parkway

From the west, the road starts as the five-lane highway Johnson Road coming from Triana Boulevard heading east. At Leeman Ferry Road, Johnson Road becomes Airport Road, traveling through John Hunt Park as a scenic four lane divided highway leading to Memorial Parkway. After crossing under the Parkway, the road crosses over a former Louisville and Nashville Railroad rail line and narrow to fit between the many businesses down the street. Airport Road passes north of the Westbury Shopping Center and south of the Country Club apartments.

Airport Road has signalized intersections with Balmoral Drive and Queensbury Drive, both of which lead to the large Waterford Square (formerly named Queensbury) apartments complex, and Chateau Drive, which leads to a residential neighborhood. Following these intersections is Hospital Drive, which leads to Crestwood Medical Center to the north. Several churches, including Trinity United Methodist Church, run along the south side of Airport Road. Airport Road then meets Whitesburg Drive, where it travels across Garth Mountain, then runs into Jones Valley, where the road then becomes Carl T. Jones Drive. The same 21.7 miles (34.9 km) stretch of asphalt has several more names (Bailey Cove Road, Green Cove Road, Buxton Road, Dodd Road) until it loops back through Redstone Arsenal to 4.4 miles (7.1 km) from where it started.

== History ==
Airport Road once provided direct access to the old airport from Whitesburg Drive, which was once US-231. The old airport was located west of Memorial Parkway in what is now John Hunt Park. In fact, several old runways still exist.

On November 15, 1989, a tornado destroyed much of the businesses along Airport Road including numerous houses in the heavily populated residential areas around the road. Twenty-one people died, 463 were injured, and it caused an estimated $100 million in damage.

== Major intersections ==
Airport Road continues west as Johnson Road at the intersection of Leeman Ferry Road. The road continues as Carl T. Jones Drive in the east at the top of Garth Mountain. The road later becomes Bailey Cove Road and Green Cove Road.

| Road | Notes |
Johnson Road
| Triana Blvd SW | Start of roadway |
Airport Road
| Leeman Ferry Road SW | Leads to Joe Davis Stadium |
| Memorial Parkway | |
| Whitesburg Drive South | |
Carl T. Jones Drive
| Garth Road SE | |
| Cecil Asburn Drive SE/Four Mile Post Road | Leads to Hampton Cove |
Bailey Cove Road
| Willowbrook Drive SE | |
| Weatherly Road SE | |
| Green Mountain Road SE | |
| Mountain Gap Road SE | |
| Hobbs Road SE | |
Green Cove Road
| Ditto Landing Parkway SE | Leads to Ditto Landing |
| Memorial Parkway | |

== Retail ==
Shopping centers located on Airport Road include:

- Piedmont Point Shopping Center
- The Village on Whitesburg
- Westbury Shopping Center
- Whitesburg Shopping Center, since 1990

== Transportation ==
Shuttle buses provided by the City of Huntsville stop along Airport Road.
