= Web Rule Language =

Rule-based ontology language

The Web Rule Language (WRL) is a rule-based ontology language for the Semantic Web. The language is characterized by formal semantics.

== See also ==
- OWL
- RDF
- XML
