= Washakie County, Wyoming =

County in Wyoming, United States

- County
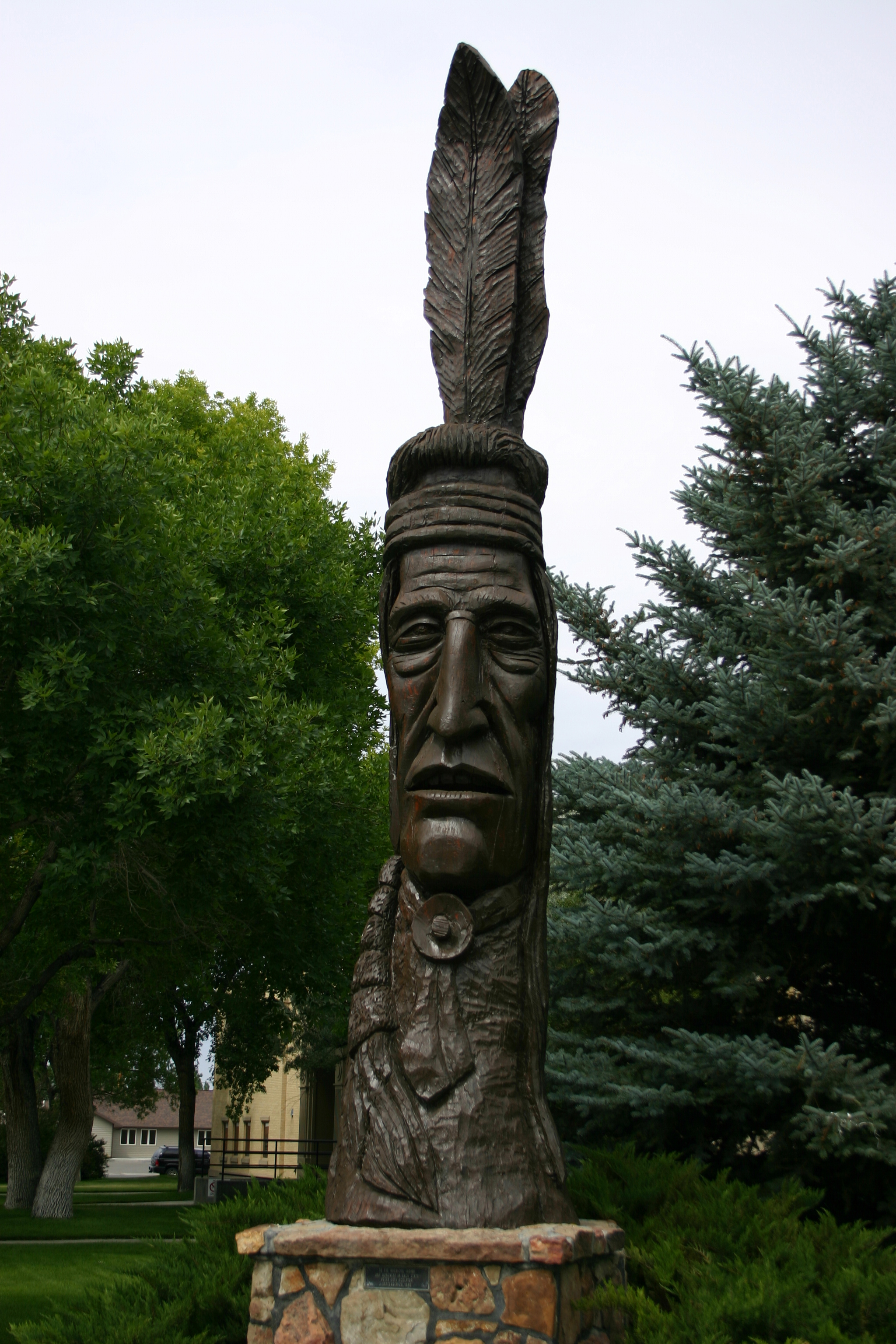
- Indian Totem in Worland

- Location within the U.S. state of Wyoming
- Coordinates: 43°55′N 107°41′W
- Country: United States
- State: Wyoming
- Founded: February 21, 1911 (authorized); 1913 (organized)
- Named for: Chief Washakie
- Seat: Worland
- Largest city: Worland

Area
  - Total: 2,243 sq mi (5,810 km^{2})
  - Land: 2,239 sq mi (5,800 km^{2})
  - Water: 4.2 sq mi (11 km^{2}) 0.2%

Population (2020)
  - Total: 7,685
  - Estimate (2025): 7,597 ▼
  - Density: 3.432/sq mi (1.325/km^{2})
- Time zone: UTC−7 (Mountain)
  - Summer (DST): UTC−6 (MDT)
- Congressional district: At-large
- Website: www.washakiecountywy.gov

Washakie County is a county in the U.S. state of Wyoming. As of the 2020 United States census, the population was 7,685. Its county seat is Worland.

== History ==
Washakie County was created on February 21, 1911, as Hanover County with land detached from Big Horn County and organized in 1913. The bill for creating the county initially named it "Hanover County", but it was renamed before the bill passed to Washakie County for the head chief of the Shoshone people, Chief Washakie, who became an ally of the US Government.

== Geography ==
According to the US Census Bureau, the county has a total area of 2,243 square miles (5,810 km^{2}), of which 2,239 square miles (5,800 km^{2}) is land and 4.2 square miles (11 km^{2}) (0.2%) is water.

=== Adjacent counties ===
- Big Horn County – north
- Johnson County – east
- Natrona County – southeast
- Fremont County – south
- Hot Springs County – west
- Park County – northwest

=== National protected area ===
- Bighorn National Forest (part)

== Demographics ==
Historical population
Census	Pop.	Note	%±
1920	3,106		—
1930	4,109		32.3%
1940	5,858		42.6%
1950	7,252		23.8%
1960	8,883		22.5%
1970	7,569		−14.8%
1980	9,496		25.5%
1990	8,388		−11.7%
2000	8,289		−1.2%
2010	8,533		2.9%
2020	7,685		−9.9%
2025 (est.)	7,597	▼	−1.1%
US Decennial Census; 1870–2000 2010 Its county seat is Worland.

=== 2020 census ===
As of the 2020 census, the county had a population of 7,685. Of the residents, 23.9% were under the age of 18 and 23.5% were 65 years of age or older; the median age was 44.4 years. For every 100 females there were 103.3 males, and for every 100 females age 18 and over there were 98.4 males.

Washakie County, Wyoming – Racial and ethnic composition Note: the US Census treats Hispanic/Latino as an ethnic category. This table excludes Latinos from the racial categories and assigns them to a separate category. Hispanics/Latinos may be of any race.
Race / Ethnicity (NH = Non-Hispanic)	Pop 2000	Pop 2010	Pop 2020	% 2000	% 2010	% 2020
White alone (NH)	7,143	7,158	6,268	86.17%	83.89%	81.56%
Black or African American alone (NH)	8	22	12	0.10%	0.26%	0.16%
Native American or Alaska Native alone (NH)	37	51	45	0.45%	0.60%	0.59%
Asian alone (NH)	57	46	33	0.69%	0.54%	0.43%
Pacific Islander alone (NH)	0	1	1	0.00%	0.01%	0.01%
Other race alone (NH)	4	0	43	0.05%	0.00%	0.56%
Mixed race or Multiracial (NH)	89	93	213	1.07%	1.09%	2.77%
Hispanic or Latino (any race)	951	1,162	1,070	11.47%	13.62%	13.92%
Total	8,289	8,533	7,685	100.00%	100.00%	100.00%

The racial makeup of the county was 85.9% White, 0.2% Black or African American, 1.0% American Indian and Alaska Native, 0.4% Asian, 5.0% from some other race, and 7.4% from two or more races. Hispanic or Latino residents of any race comprised 13.9% of the population.

There were 3,271 households in the county, of which 28.2% had children under the age of 18 living with them and 23.5% had a female householder with no spouse or partner present. About 30.8% of all households were made up of individuals and 14.7% had someone living alone who was 65 years of age or older.

There were 3,849 housing units, of which 15.0% were vacant. Among occupied housing units, 73.3% were owner-occupied and 26.7% were renter-occupied. The homeowner vacancy rate was 3.7% and the rental vacancy rate was 13.8%.

=== 2010 census ===
As of the 2010 United States census, there were 8,533 people, 3,492 households, and 2,395 families in the county. The population density was 3.8 people per square mile (1.5 people/km^{2}). There were 3,833 housing units at an average density of 1.7 units per square mile (0.66 units/km^{2}). The racial makeup of the county was 91.4% white, 1.1% American Indian, 0.6% Asian, 0.3% black or African American, 4.4% from other races, and 2.4% from two or more races. Those of Hispanic or Latino origin made up 13.6% of the population. In terms of ancestry, 33.1% were German, 17.6% were English, 11.7% were Irish, 6.6% were American, and 5.5% were Norwegian.

Of the 3,492 households, 30.0% had children under the age of 18 living with them, 56.4% were married couples living together, 7.9% had a female householder with no husband present, 31.4% were non-families, and 27.7% of all households were made up of individuals. The average household size was 2.40 and the average family size was 2.93. The median age was 41.8 years.

The median income for a household in the county was $48,379 and the median income for a family was $61,340. Males had a median income of $45,579 versus $30,107 for females. The per capita income for the county was $28,557. About 1.7% of families and 5.6% of the population were below the poverty line, including 1.8% of those under age 18 and 9.9% of those age 65 or over.

=== 2000 census ===
As of the 2000 United States census, there were 8,289 people, 3,278 households, and 2,310 families in the county. The population density was 4 people per square mile (1.5 people/km^{2}). There were 3,654 housing units at an average density of 2 units per square mile (0.77 units/km^{2}). The racial makeup of the county was 90.22% White, 0.11% Black or African American, 0.55% Native American, 0.74% Asian, 6.21% from other races, and 2.17% from two or more races. 11.47% of the population were Hispanic or Latino of any race. 27.1% were of German, 13.1% English, 9.9% Irish and 6.2% American ancestry.

There were 3,278 households, out of which 32.40% had children under the age of 18 living with them, 59.90% were married couples living together, 7.30% had a female householder with no husband present, and 29.50% were non-families. 26.50% of all households were made up of individuals, and 11.90% had someone living alone who was 65 years of age or older. The average household size was 2.47 and the average family size was 3.00.

The county population contained 27.20% under the age of 18, 6.40% from 18 to 24, 25.20% from 25 to 44, 25.30% from 45 to 64, and 15.90% who were 65 years of age or older. The median age was 39 years. For every 100 females there were 99.40 males. For every 100 females age 18 and over, there were 96.30 males.

The median income for a household in the county was $34,943, and the median income for a family was $42,584. Males had a median income of $31,633 versus $21,028 for females. The per capita income for the county was $17,780. About 10.00% of families and 14.10% of the population were below the poverty line, including 21.10% of those under age 18 and 12.20% of those age 65 or over.

== Communities ==
=== City ===
- Worland (county seat)

=== Town ===
- Ten Sleep

=== Unincorporated communities ===
- Airport Road
- Big Trails
- Mc Nutt
- South Flat
- Washakie Ten
- West River
- Winchester

== Government and infrastructure ==
Like almost all of Wyoming, Washakie County is overwhelmingly Republican. No Democratic presidential candidate has carried Washakie County since Franklin D. Roosevelt’s 1936 landslide against Alf Landon. Although Lyndon Johnson did get within eighteen votes of Barry Goldwater, no Democrat since has reached one-third of the county's vote.

United States presidential election results for Washakie County, Wyoming
Year	Republican		Democratic		Third party(ies)	
Year	No.	%	No.	%	No.	%
1912	258	38.22%	221	32.74%	196	29.04%
1916	344	42.05%	455	55.62%	19	2.32%
1920	609	64.31%	333	35.16%	5	0.53%
1924	724	60.13%	209	17.36%	271	22.51%
1928	966	70.72%	392	28.70%	8	0.59%
1932	711	40.61%	1,009	57.62%	31	1.77%
1936	810	41.26%	1,109	56.50%	44	2.24%
1940	1,080	53.12%	942	46.34%	11	0.54%
1944	1,130	59.26%	777	40.74%	0	0.00%
1948	1,074	55.79%	851	44.21%	0	0.00%
1952	2,148	70.82%	880	29.01%	5	0.16%
1956	2,265	69.61%	989	30.39%	0	0.00%
1960	2,254	62.70%	1,341	37.30%	0	0.00%
1964	1,713	50.26%	1,695	49.74%	0	0.00%
1968	2,038	64.01%	948	29.77%	198	6.22%
1972	2,604	75.92%	825	24.05%	1	0.03%
1976	2,361	66.68%	1,168	32.99%	12	0.34%
1980	2,634	67.59%	945	24.25%	318	8.16%
1984	3,245	76.30%	970	22.81%	38	0.89%
1988	2,538	67.36%	1,197	31.77%	33	0.88%
1992	1,720	43.19%	1,118	28.08%	1,144	28.73%
1996	2,250	56.73%	1,205	30.38%	511	12.88%
2000	3,138	77.46%	806	19.90%	107	2.64%
2004	3,200	77.78%	855	20.78%	59	1.43%
2008	2,956	72.29%	1,042	25.48%	91	2.23%
2012	3,014	76.42%	794	20.13%	136	3.45%
2016	2,911	76.32%	532	13.95%	371	9.73%
2020	3,245	80.88%	651	16.23%	116	2.89%
2024	3,125	80.60%	656	16.92%	96	2.48%

The Wyoming Department of Family Services Juvenile Services Division operates the Wyoming Boys' School, located in Mc Nutt, unincorporated Washakie County, near Worland. The facility was operated by the Wyoming Board of Charities and Reform until that agency was dissolved as a result of a state constitutional amendment passed in November 1990.

== See also ==
- National Register of Historic Places listings in Washakie County, Wyoming
- Wyoming
  - List of cities and towns in Wyoming
  - List of counties in Wyoming
  - Wyoming statistical areas
