= Wyoming Board of Charities and Reform =

State agency of Wyoming

The Wyoming Board of Charities and Reform (BCR) was a state agency of Wyoming that operated the state's charitable and penal institutions.

== History ==
Article 7, Section 18. Chapter 37, Session Laws of Wyoming, 1890-1891 of the Wyoming Constitution established the BCR on July 10, 1890. In November 1990, Wyoming voters approved a constitutional amendment that abolished the board. The institutions of the former state agency were divided and given to other agencies.

The Wyoming Department of Corrections, created in 1991, took control of the Wyoming State Penitentiary, the Wyoming Women’s Center, the Wyoming Honor Conservation Camp, and the Wyoming Honor Farm. The Wyoming Department of Family Services took the Wyoming Boys' School, the Wyoming Girls' School, and the Youth Treatment Center. The Wyoming Department of Health took the Veterans' Home of Wyoming, the Wyoming Pioneer Home, the Wyoming Retirement Center, the Wyoming State Hospital, and the Wyoming Training School.
