= Worland High School =

Coordinates: 44°00′34″N 107°56′40″W

Location
- 801 South 17th Street; Worland, Wyoming; United States

Information
- Type: Public high school
- Motto: "Students are first priority at Worland High School"
- School district: Washakie County School District #1
- Grades: 9–12
- Enrollment: 366 (2023-2024)
- Campus: Rural
- Colors: Orange and black
- Mascot: Warriors
- Website: Worland High School

Worland High School is a public high school in Worland, Wyoming, United States. It is part of Washakie County School District #1.

== Description ==
Worland High School has 9th through 12th grades, and on average there are 370 students enrolled. The school is set in the town of Worland, Wyoming, which had a population 5,250 in the 2000 census. The high school's mascot is the Native American warrior, and the students are commonly referred to as the "Worland Warriors" and "Worland Lady Warriors."

=== Athletics ===
Sport options include men and women's cross-country, swimming, track and field, basketball, soccer and golf. Women's volleyball, cheerleading and gymnastics (state program lost 2008) and men's wrestling and football are offered.

=== Additional student programs ===
- Band
- Debate
- FFA
- Choir
- Theater
- Art
- Welding
- Philosophy Club
- Key Club
- "W" Club
- National Honor Society
- Yearbook
- Student Council
- Newspaper

=== The Arrow ===
The student-composed monthly newspaper The Arrow appears in the local paper's TV guide. In the 2008 school year, students created the Scream II, an independently produced weekly newspaper. Its name was an homage to the original high school's newspaper, The Scream, which has since been discontinued.

The school board initially turned down Barack Obama's stimulus money, angering many parents and students. However, after several letters to the editor by parents and students were printed in the local newspaper, the school board decided to revisit the stimulus money options. A final result was very close and the money was again rejected.

=== District spending ===
The Washakie County School District #1 spends $14,260 per pupil in current expenditures. The district spends 64% on instruction, 33% on support services, and 3% on other elementary and secondary expenditures.

=== District student-teacher ratio ===
The Washakie County School District #1 has 12 students for every full-time equivalent teacher, with the Wyoming state average being 13 students per full-time equivalent teacher.

=== District student information ===
The Washakie County School District #1 had a grades 9-12 dropout rate of 6% in 2007. The national grades 9-12 dropout rate in 2007 was 4.4%.

In the Washakie County School District #1, 27% of students have an Individualized Education Program. An IEP is a written plan for students eligible for special needs services.

The Washakie County School District #1 serves 6% English language learners, who are in the process of acquiring and learning English Language skills.
