= List of state highways in Wyoming =

- Signage used for Wyoming State Highways, which includes the Bucking Horse and Rider.

Highway names
- Interstates: Interstate X (I-X)
- US Highways: U.S. Highway X (US X)
- State: Wyoming Highway X (State Route X; WYO X)

System links
- Wyoming State Highway System; Interstate; US; State

The state highway system in the U.S. state of Wyoming consists of a series of numbered routes; usually known as WYO X, where X is the route number.

== List ==
Number	Length (mi)	Length (km)	Southern or western terminus	Northern or eastern terminus	Formed	Removed	Notes
WYO 10	9.12	14.68	Larimer CR 103 at CO border	WYO 230 in Woods Landing	—	—	Jelm Mountain Road
WYO 11	10.94	17.61	NFS Route 500 in Albany	WYO 130 near Centennial	—	—	Albany Road
WYO 12	12.18	19.60	Albany CR 57 near Woodedge	WYO 130 near Laramie	—	—	Herrick Lane
WYO 13	17.76	28.58	I-80 at Arlington	US 30 and US 287 in Rock River	—	—	Arlington Road
WYO 14	449.21	722.93	US 14 in Cody	US 14 in Burgess Junction	1940	1965	Replaced by US 14A
WYO 14	0.36	0.58	Laramie Regional Airport	WYO 130 near Laramie Regional Airport	—	—	Airport Road
WYO 22	17.53	28.21	ID 33 near Wilson	US 26/US 89/US 189/US 191 in Jackson	1942	current	Teton Pass Highway
WYO 24	46.72	75.19	US 14 at Devils Tower Junction	SD 34 near Aladdin	1961	current	Bear Lodge Highway
WYO 26	52.38	84.30	US 30/US 287 near Bosler	US 87 in Wheatland	1926	1949	Replaced by WYO 34
WYO 28	96.50	155.30	WYO 372 near Farson	US 287/WYO 789 near Lander	—	—	South Pass Highway
WYO 30	26.02	41.88	US 14/US 16/US 20 near Burlington	US 16/US 20/WYO 789 in Basin	—	—	Otto Road
WYO 31	22.09	35.55	US 16/US 20/WYO 789 in Manderson	Big Horn CR R49 at Hyattville	—	—	Cold Springs Road
WYO 32	31.48	50.66	US 14/US 16/US 20 near Emblem	US 310/US 14A/WYO 789 near Lovell	—	—	Emblem Highway
WYO 33	1.39	2.24	BLM route near Forester Gulch	WYO 32 near Lovell	—	—	Mileage marker starts at 2.89, coinciding with WYO 32 mileage at junction
WYO 34	52.38	84.30	US 30/US 287 south of Bosler	I-25/US 87 south of Wheatland	1949	current	Laramie–Wheatland Road
WYO 35	1.08	1.74	Big Horn CR R7 near Cowley	US 310/WYO 789 in Cowley	—	—	
WYO 36	2.76	4.44	WYO 30 in Basin	US 16/US 20/WYO 789 north of Basin	—	—	
WYO 37	9.00	14.48	US 14A near Lovell	Bighorn Canyon NRA	—	—	
WYO 50	52.67	84.76	WYO 387 at Pine Tree Junction	US 14/US 16/WYO 59/I-90 Bus. in Gillette	—	—	Skyline Drive; 4 J Road
WYO 51	24.79	39.90	I-90/US 14/US 16/I-90 Bus. in Gillette	US 14/US 16/I-90 Bus. in Moorcroft	—	—	Rozet Road
WYO 59	171.97	276.76	I-25/US 20/US 26/US 87/I-25 Bus./US 20 Bus./US 26 Bus./US 87 Bus./WYO 94 in Douglas	MT 59 near Gillette	1945	current	
WYO 65	55.84	89.87	US 30S in Evanston UT 30 near Kemmerer	UT 16 near Bear River ID 61 near Geneva, Idaho	1924	1938	Replaced by WYO 89 over northern portion in 1926 (reduced route to 17.44 mi), then over southern portion in 1938
WYO 70	57.66	92.79	WYO 789 in Baggs	WYO 230 in Riverside	—	—	Battle Highway
WYO 71	10.83	17.43	Carbon CR 401 near Rawlins	WYO 78 in Rawlins	—	—	Sage Creek Road
WYO 72	15.45	24.86	Carbon CR 402 in Elk Mountain	Adams Street in Hanna	—	—	Hanna Road
WYO 73	4.64	7.47	Sweetwater	US 287/WY 789 in Lamont	—	—	Bairoil Road
WYO 74	0.13	0.21	WYO 130 in Saratoga	Carbon CR 504 in Saratoga	—	—	Unsigned; Bridge Street
WYO 75	22.10	35.57	WYO 487 near Medicine Bow	WYO 487 near Alcove	—	1975	Replaced by WYO 487
WYO 76	6.54	10.53	I-80/US 30/US 287/I-80 Bus./US 30 Bus. in Rawlins	I-80/US 30/US 287 near Sinclair	—	—	Old US 30/US 287
WYO 77	22.18	35.70	WYO 487 north of Medicine Bow	WYO 487 near Alcove	1975	current	Old Shirley Basin Road
WYO 78	1.23	1.98	Wyoming State Penitentiary in Rawlins	WYO 71 in Rawlins	—	—	Higley Boulevard
WYO 87	53.20	85.62	CO 13 near Baggs, Wyoming	US 30 near Creston	1930	1940	Replaced by WYO 330, now WYO 789; Baggs Road
WYO 89	55.84	89.87	I-80/US 189/WYO 150 in Evanston UT 30 near Kemmerer	UT 16 near Bear River ID 61 near Geneva, Idaho	1926	current	route only covered northern portion 1926-, decommissioned (became WYO 91) 1936, recommissioned over WYO 65 and WYO 91 1938
WYO 90	3.00	4.83	Converse CR 17 southeast of Glenrock	US 20/US 26/US 87/I-25 Bus. east of Glenrock	—	—	Boxelder Road
WYO 91	38.40	61.80	UT 30 near Kemmerer	ID 61 near Geneva, Idaho	1936	1938	Replaced by WYO 89
WYO 91	23.10	37.18	Converse CR 11/CR 24 southwest of Douglas	WYO 94 in Douglas	—	—	Cold Springs Road
WYO 92	16.50	26.55	US 26/US 85 in Torrington	N-92 near Huntley	—	—	
WYO 93	26.02	41.88	WYO 59 in Douglas	Converse CR 32/CR 33 northwest of Douglas	—	—	
WYO 94	16.61	26.73	Converse CR 5 north of Esterbrook	I-25 Bus./US 20 Bus./US 26 Bus./US 87 Bus./WYO 59 in Douglas	—	—	Esterbrook Road
WYO 95	19.23	30.95	I-25/I-25 Bus. south of Glenrock US 20, US 26/US 87 in Glenrock	US 20/US 26/US 87/I-25 Bus. in Glenrock WYO 93 northeast of Glenrock	—	—	Monkey Mountain Road; Glenrock-Ross Road
WYO 96	3.11	5.01	I-25/US 20/US 26/US 87 near Douglas	WYO 91 west of Douglas	—	—	
WYO 110	0.585	0.941	WYO 24 near Devils Tower	Devils Tower NM	—	—	Devils Tower Road, Entrance Road
WYO 111	8.63	13.89	I-90 and US 14 northeast of Sundance	WYO 24 at Aladdin	—	—	
WYO 112	29.50	47.48	WYO 24 in Hulett	Montana state line south of Alzada, Montana	—	—	
WYO 113	6.61	10.64	US 14 north of Moorcroft	Pine Haven Road in Pine Haven	—	—	Old Sundance Road
WYO 114	10.82	17.41	US 14 Alt. at Garland	US 310 and WYO 789 in Deaver	—	—	Old Sundance Road
WYO 116	—	—	—	—	—	—	Replaced by US 116 (later US 14)
WYO 116	60.97	98.12	WYO 450 west of Newcastle	US 14 and I-90 Bus. in Sundance	—	—	
WYO 120	121.96	196.28	US 20 and WYO 789 in Thermopolis	Montana state line north of Clark	—	—	
WYO 130	98.52	158.55	I-80, US 30, and US 287 south of Walcott	I-80 Bus., US 30, and US 287 in Laramie	—	—	Snowy Range Road
WYO 131	9.00	14.48	Sinks Canyon Road southwest of Lander	US 287 in Lander	—	—	Sinks Canyon Road
WYO 132	17.43	28.05	US 287 north of Lander	US 26 and WYO 133 at Kinnear	—	—	Ethete Road
WYO 133	6.07	9.77	US 26 and WYO 132 at Kinnear	Pavillion Road in Pavillion	—	—	Pavillion Road
WYO 134	24.17	38.90	WYO 133 south of Pavillion	US 26 and WYO 789 southwest of Shoshoni	—	—	Missouri Valley Road
WYO 135	35.62	57.32	US 287 and WYO 789 at Sweetwater Station	WYO 789 south of Riverton	—	—	Sand Draw Road
WYO 136	42.70	68.72	WYO 135 south of Riverton	CR 5 in the Gas Hills Uranium Mining District	—	—	Gas Hills Road
WYO 137	8.79	14.15	CR 334 southwest of Riverton	WYO 789 south of Riverton	—	—	Seventeen Mile Road. Returned to tribal control in 2015.
WYO 138	8.14	13.10	WYO 789 east of Hudson	WYO 137 at Saint Stephens	—	—	Rendezvous Road. Returned to tribal control in 2010.
WYO 139	1.45	2.33	WYO 135 west of Sand Draw	Sand Draw	—	—	Sand Draw Road
WYO 150	23.05	37.10	UT 150 at UT border	I-80/US 189/WYO 89 near Evanston	—	—	Mirror Lake Scenic Byway
WYO 151	9.89	15.92	US 85 west of LaGrange	N-88 at NE border	—	—	La Grange Road
WYO 152	9.80	15.77	Goshen CR 124	US 85/WYO 161 east of Yoder	—	—	
WYO 153	1.02	1.64	WYO 152	Goshen CR 33	—	—	Goodland Road
WYO 154	21.11	33.97	WYO 152 in Yoder	US 85/WYO 92 south of Torrington	—	—	Goodland Road
WYO 155	—	—	—	—	—	—	Now part of WYO 156 and WYO 157
WYO 156	14.29	23.00	US 26/US 85 in Lingle	US 85/WYO 92 in Torrington	—	—	
WYO 157	7.99	12.86	US 26 southeast of Fort Laramie	WYO 156 in Lingle	—	—	
WYO 158	8.02	12.91	WYO 92 southeast of Huntley	CR 63 at NE border	—	—	
WYO 159	12.78	20.57	US 26/US 85 in Torrington	Goshen CR 47 north of Torrington	—	—	
WYO 160	1.08	1.74	Goshen CR 53 west of Fort Laramie	US 26 in Fort Laramie	—	—	
WYO 161	7.03	11.31	US 85/WYO 152 east of Yoder	WYO 92 in Huntley	—	—	
WYO 170	15.41	24.80	CR 15 at Hamilton Dome	WYO 120 northwest of Thermopolis	—	—	Owl Creek Road (east–west); Hamilton Dome Road (north–south)
WYO 171	8.63	13.89	CR 17 and CR 36 at Glass Creek	WYO 120 east of Glass Creek	—	—	Grass Creek Road
WYO 172	11.26	18.12	US 20 and WYO 789 at Lucerne	CR 6 east of Lucerne	—	—	Kirby Creek Road; Black Mountain Road
WYO 173	1.61	2.59	US 20 and WYO 789 south of Thermopolis	CR 31 south of Thermopolis	—	—	
WYO 174	0.60	0.97	CR 1 south of Hamilton Dome	WYO 170 south of Hamilton Dome	—	—	Red Creek Ranch Road
WYO 175	0.32	0.51	US 20 and WYO 789 west of Kirby	West Main Street in Kirby	—	—	Kirby Road
WYO 176	—	—	—	—	—	—	Now Owl Hill Creek Road. May have been part of the current WYO 120 alignment
WYO 185	—	—	US 20/US 26/US 87 in Douglas	MT 59 near Gillette	1934	1936	Replaced by WYO 387, now WYO 59
WYO 190	9.66	15.55	CR 78 at Barnum	WYO 191 west of Kaycee	—	—	Barnum Road
WYO 191	11.71	18.85	CR 115 and CR 266 at Mayoworth	WYO 192 and WYO 196 in Kaycee	—	—	Mayoworth Road
WYO 192	35.64	57.36	WYO 191 and WYO 196 in Kaycee	WYO 387 northeast of Edgerton	—	—	
WYO 193	6.19	9.96	I-90 and US 87 near Kearny	US 87 at Banner	—	—	
WYO 194	2.81	4.52	Story Fish Hatchery west of Story	WYO 193 east of Story	—	—	
WYO 196	49.84	80.21	I-25 and US 87 south of Kaycee	I-25 Bus. and US 87 Bus. in Buffalo	—	—	Old US 87
WYO 197	—	—	—	—	—	—	Now County Road 110
WYO 210	37.79	60.82	I-80/US 30 east of Laramie	I-25/US 87 in Cheyenne	—	—	Happy Jack Road
WYO 211	43.88	70.62	WYO 219 north of Cheyenne	I-25/US 87 and WYO 313/I-25 Bus. in Chugwater	—	—	Horse Creek Road; Iron Mountain Road
WYO 212	14.06	22.63	I-25/US 87 near Cheyenne	WYO 219 in Ranchettes	—	—	College Drive; Four Mile Road
WYO 213	19.80	31.87	I-80/US 30 and WYO 214 south of Burns	US 85 south of Meriden	—	—	Burns Road
WYO 214	8.39	13.50	Laramie CR 203-1 in Carpenter	I-80/US 30 and WYO 213 south of Burns	—	—	Carpenter Road
WYO 215	17.19	27.66	I-80/US 30 in Pine Bluffs	WYO 216 in Albin	—	—	
WYO 216	18.54	29.84	US 85 south of Meriden	Laramie CR 164 at NE border	—	—	Albin Road
WYO 216	—	—	—	—	—	—	Replaced by US 216
WYO 217	4.43	7.13	Laramie CR 140 northwest of Carpenter	I-80/US 30 southwest of Hillsdale	—	2009	
WYO 218	1.77	2.85	Laramie CR 102 south of Granite Canon	I-80/US 30 in Granite Canon	—	2009	Harriman Road
WYO 219	5.48	8.82	I-25 Bus./US 85 in Cheyenne	US 85 north of Cheyenne	—	—	Yellowstone Road
WYO 220	72.79	117.14	US 287 and WYO 789 north of Muddy Gap	I-25, US 20, US 26, and US 87 in Casper	—	—	Alcova Highway
WYO 221	1.84	2.96	I-25 Bus./US 85 in Fox Farm-College	WYO 212 in Fox Farm-College	—	—	Fox Farm Road
WYO 222	1.81	2.91	WYO 225 west of Cheyenne	WYO 210 west of Cheyenne	—	—	Fort Access Road
WYO 223	5.69	9.16	I-25/US 87 southwest of Cheyenne	US 85 south of Cheyenne	—	—	Terry Ranch Road
WYO 224	0.12	0.19	I-25/US 87 in Cheyenne	WYDOT Headquarters	—	—	Wyoming Dept. of Transportation Headquarters Entrance
WYO 225	11.21	18.04	I-80/US 30 east of Granite Canon	I-80/US 30 west of Cheyenne	—	—	Otto Road
WYO 226	—	—	—	—	—	—	Replaced by WYO 210
WYO 230	74.78	120.35	WYO 130 south of Saratoga	I-80 Bus./US 30/US 287 in Laramie	—	—	Rivers Road
WYO 231	0.60	0.97	CR 207 in Cokeville	US 30, WYO 89, and WYO 232 in Cokeville	—	—	Cokeville–Utah Road
WYO 232	12.22	19.67	US 30, WYO 89, and WYO 231 in Cokeville	Smiths Fork Road north of Cokeville	—	—	Smiths Fork Road
WYO 233	19.29	31.04	US 189 in Kemmerer	CR 305 north of Kemmerer	—	—	Hams Fork Road
WYO 234	—	—	Kemmerer Municipal Airport near Frontier	WYO 233 in Frontier	—	—	Now County Route 234
WYO 235	4.49	7.23	US 189 in La Barge	CR 134 at Calpet	—	—	
WYO 236	2.60	4.18	CR 140 and CR 142 at Fairveiw	US 89 south of Afton	—	—	
WYO 237	3.42	5.50	1st Street at Auburn	US 89 at Grover	—	—	
WYO 238	12.08	19.44	US 89 in Afton	US 89 north of Auburn	—	—	
WYO 239	1.64	2.64	Idaho state line at Freedom	US 89 east of Freedom	—	—	
WYO 240	12.28	19.76	US 30 in Opal	US 189 northeast of Kemmerer	—	—	Opal Road
WYO 241	4.27	6.87	US 89 north of Smoot	WYO 236 south of Afton	—	—	
WYO 250	—	—	—	—	—	—	Former spur route that ran north from WYO 487
WYO 251	8.99	14.47	CR 505 at Casper Mountain	I-25 Bus., US 20 Bus., US 26 Bus., and US 87 Bus. in Casper	—	—	Casper Mountain Road; Walcott Road
WYO 252	4.37	7.03	WYO 251 south of Casper	WYO 258 in Casper	—	—	Gothmore Park Spur; Garden Creek Road
WYO 253	10.90	17.54	CR 606 southeast of Casper	US 20, US 26, and US 87 in Evansville	—	—	
WYO 254	4.06	6.53	US 20 Bus. and US 26 Bus. in Mills	I-25 and US 87 at Hartrandt	—	—	
WYO 255	0.48	0.77	I-25 Bus., US 20 Bus., US 26 Bus., and US 87 Bus. in Casper	I-25, US 20, US 26, US 87, I-25 Bus., and US 87 Bus. in Casper	—	—	Center Street Casper
WYO 256	2.67	4.30	US 20, US 26, US 87, and WYO 253 in Evansville	CR 701 northeast of Evansville	—	—	Cole Creek Road
WYO 257	7.30	11.75	WYO 220 south of Red Butte	US 20, US 26, US 20 Bus., and US 26 Bus. in Casper	—	—	Casper West Belt Loop
WYO 258	10.58	17.03	US 20 Bus. and US 26 Bus. in Casper, Wyoming	US 20, US 26, and US 87 in Evansville	—	—	Casper Beltline
WYO 259	18.00	28.97	I-25 and US 87 north of Antelope Hills	WYO 387 in Midwest	—	—	
WYO 270	73.37	118.08	US 26 east of Guernsey	US 18 and US 85 north of Lusk	—	—	
WYO 271	3.19	5.13	CR 23 at West Lance Creek	WYO 270 at Lance Creek	—	—	Manning Road
WYO 272	3.32	5.34	WYO 270 east of Lance Creek	CR 14 north of Lance Creek	—	—	North Lance Creek Road
WYO 273	0.33	0.53	US 18 and US 20 east of Lusk	Niobrara Country Club	—	—	Country Club Road
WYO 274	—	—	WYO 270 in Manville	US 18/US 20 southeast of Manville	—	—	Designated along old US 18/US 20
WYO 287	—	—	—	—	—	—	Replaced by US 189
WYO 290	11.23	18.07	CR 4IX and CR 5XS near Dumbell	WYO 120 in Meeteetse	—	—	
WYO 291	9.46	15.22	CR 6WX southwest of Cody	US 14, US 16, and US 20 in Cody	—	—	Clarks Fork Canyon Road
WYO 292	—	—	Morrison Jeep Trail west of Clark	WYO 120 east of Clark	—	—	Now County Road 1Ab
WYO 293	—	—	WYO 120 near Cody, Wyoming	Yellowstone Regional Airport	—	—	Now County Road 3CX
WYO 294	18.82	30.29	US 14 Alt. near Ralston	WYO 120 near Clark	—	—	
WYO 295	29.35	47.23	WYO 32 southeast of Powell	CR 1NG near Elk Basin	—	—	
WYO 296	45.96	73.97	US 212 near Yellowstone NP	WYO 120 north of Cody	—	—	Chief Joseph Highway
WYO 297	—	—	WYO 292 near Clark	County Road 1Ab northwest of Clark	—	—	Now County Road 1Ab
WYO 310	8.49	13.66	Reservoir Rd at Wheatland Reservoir #1	I-25 Bus., US 87 Bus., and WYO 312 in Wheatland	—	—	Oak Street Wheatland
WYO 311	1.99	3.20	WYO 310 in Westview Circle	Platte CR 139 and CR 90	—	—	Hightower Road
WYO 312	7.30	11.75	WYO 34 south of Wheatland	I-25 Bus., US 87 Bus., and WYO 310 in Wheatland	—	—	Preuit Road
WYO 313	30.81	49.58	I-25 Bus. and WYO 321 in Chugwater	US 85 south of Hawk Springs	—	—	
WYO 314	8.57	13.79	I-25/US 87 west of Slater	Slater Road east of WYO 315	—	—	Slater Road
WYO 315	3.01	4.84	WYO 314 in Slater	Bordeaux Road north of Slater	—	—	Pioneer Road
WYO 316	11.91	19.17	I-25 Bus./US 87 Bus. in Wheatland	Dickinson Hill Road/Deer Creek Road	—	—	
WYO 317	1.66	2.67	US 26 west of Guernsey	Guernsey State Park	—	—	
WYO 318	1.09	1.75	WYO 270 in Hartville	Sunrise	—	—	
WYO 319	28.75	46.27	I-25, US 26, and US 87 south of Glendo	US 18 and US 20 east of Orin	—	—	Old Yellowstone Highway
WYO 320	12.33	19.84	I-25 BL / US 87 Bus. in Wheatland	US 26 in Dwyer	—	—	Old Yellowstone Highway
WYO 321	3.34	5.38	I-25 / US 87 / WYO 211 in Chugwater	I-25 / US 87 north of Chugwater	—	—	Old Yellowstone Highway
WYO 322	—	—	—	—	—	—	Replaced by WWY 211
WYO 330	53.20	85.62	CO 13 near Baggs	US 30 near Creston	1940	1954	Replaced by WYO 789
WYO 330	3.30	5.31	CR 74 west of Sheridan	I-90 Bus., US 14 Bus., US 87 Bus., and WYO 336 in Sheridan	—	—	Fifth Street Sheridan
WYO 331	9.92	15.96	CR 53 at Beckton	I-90 Bus., US 14 Bus., and US 87 Bus. in Sheridan	—	—	Big Goose Canyon Road
WYO 332	5.44	8.75	US 87 and WYO 335 south of Sheridan	I-90 Bus., US 14 Bus., and US 87 Bus. in Sheridan	—	—	Big Horn Avenue
WYO 333	0.75	1.21	Sheridan County Airport	WYO 332 in Sheridan	—	—	Airport Road
WYO 334	0.74	1.19	WYO 332 in Sheridan	I-90 Bus., US 14 Bus., and US 87 Bus. in Sheridan	—	—	
WYO 335	9.71	15.63	CR 26 southwest of Big Horn	US 87 and WYO 332 south of Sheridan	—	—	Brinton Road; Red Grade Road
WYO 336	11.52	18.54	I-90 Bus., US 14 Bus., US 87 Bus., and WYO 330 in Sheridan	CR 42 at Wyarno	—	—	Ulm Road
WYO 337	1.54	2.48	Fort MacKenzie Road in Sheridan	I-90 Bus., US 14 Bus., and US 87 Bus. in Sheridan	—	—	Fort Road
WYO 338	15.03	24.19	I-90, I-90 Bus., US 14 Bus., and US 87 Bus. in Sheridan	Montana state line north of Sheridan	—	—	Decker Road; Higby Road
WYO 339	1.02	1.64	I-90, US 14, and US 87 north of Sheridan	WYO 338 north of Sheridan	—	—	Jensick Connector
WYO 340	1.35	2.17	CR 2 west of Story	WYO 194 at Story	—	—	
WYO 341	3.19	5.13	CR 38 and CR 273 at Arvada	US 14 and US 16 north of Arvada	—	—	Arvada Spur
WYO 342	1.14	1.83	US 87 south of Sheridan	I-90 south of Sheridan	—	—	Meade Road
WYO 343	5.24	8.43	US 14 in Dayton	WYO 345 in Parkman	—	—	
WYO 344	27.77	44.69	—	—	—	—	Unsigned; Old US 87/US 87
WYO 345	19.27	31.01	Montana state line north of Parkman	I-90, US 14, and US 87 at Monarch	—	—	
WYO 346	1.35	2.17	—	—	—	—	Unsigned; Old US 87
WYO 350	5.06	8.14	CR 111 and CR 142 west of Big Piney	US 189 in Big Piney	—	—	Middle Piney Road
WYO 351	24.18	38.91	US 189 north of Marbleton	US 191 east of Marbleton	—	—	
WYO 352	25.31	40.73	US 191 west of Pinedale	Bridger-Teton NF	—	—	
WYO 353	15.51	24.96	US 191 at Boulder	CR 118 and CR 133 near Big Sandy	—	—	
WYO 354	6.17	9.93	CR 112 northwest of Daniel	US 189 and US 191 north of Daniel	—	—	Daniel–Merna Road
WYO 370	4.63	7.45	I-80 and US 30 east of Rock Springs	Rock Springs-Sweetwater County Airport	—	—	Baxter Road
WYO 371	7.30	11.75	I-80 and US 30 south of Superior	Upper Superior Road in Superior	—	—	Superior Road
WYO 372	45.89	73.85	WYO 374 west of James Town	US 189 west of Fontenelle	—	—	La Barge Road
WYO 373	51.39	82.70	Utah state line south of Rock Springs	I-80 and US 30 west of Rock Springs	—	1982	Replaced by US 191
WYO 374	25.37	40.83	I-80 south of Granger I-80 and US 30 at Little America	US 30 south of Granger I-80 Bus. and US 30 in Green River	—	—	Jamestown Road
WYO 375	0.99	1.59	3rd Street in Granger	US 30 in Granger	—	—	Granger Road
WYO 376	4.31	6.94	I-80 Bus. and US 30 Bus. in Rock Springs	I-80 Bus. and US 30 Bus. in Rock Springs	—	—	Rock Springs Beltway; Circumferential Highway
WYO 377	1.96	3.15	I-80 and US 30 at Point of Rocks	CR 15 east of Point of Rocks	—	2017	Point of Rocks Road
WYO 387	57.81	93.04	I-25 and US 87 west of Midwest	WYO 59 in Wright	—	—	
WYO 387	—	—	US 20/US 26/US 87 in Douglas	MT 59 near Gillette	1936	1945	Replaced by WYO 59
WYO 390	15.00	24.14	WYO 22 east of Wilson	Grand Teton NP	—	—	Moose–Wilson Road
WYO 391	0.30	0.48	US 26 / US 89 / US 191 / US 189	WYDOT Maintenance Shop	—	—	Jackson Area Wyoming Department of Transportation Maintenance Shop
WYO 410	13.36	21.50	CR 204 west of Robertson	WYO 411 southwest of Mountain View	1971	current	
WYO 411	3.97	6.39	CR 260 in Millburne	WYO 410 southwest of Mountain View	—	—	Milburne Road
WYO 412	24.73	39.80	I-80 and WYO 414 northwest of Lyman	US 189 south of Kemmerer	1971	current	Carter–Lyman Road
WYO 413	2.73	4.39	I-80 BL in Lyman	I-80 north of Lyman	—	—	
WYO 414	46.12	74.22	SR-43 at the Utah state line	I-80 / WYO 412 near McKinnon	1971	current	
WYO 416	—	—	—	—	—	—	Replaced by US 14
WYO 420	—	—	—	—	—	—	Replaced by WYO 120
WYO 430	53.52	86.13	Colorado state line near Hiawatha, Colorado	WYO 376 in Rock Springs	—	—	
WYO 431	30.19	48.59	WYO 120 south of Meeteetse	US 20, WYO 432, and WYO 789 southwest of Worland	—	—	
WYO 432	10.29	16.56	US 20, WYO 431, and WYO 789 southwest of Worland	US 20 and WYO 789 in Worland	—	—	
WYO 433	18.81	30.27	US 20 and WYO 789 in Worland	US 16, US 20, and WYO 789 west of Manderson	—	—	
WYO 434	20.63	33.20	CR R82 at Big Trails	US 16 in Ten Sleep	—	—	Nowood Road
WYO 435	0.78	1.26	US 16 east of Ten Sleep	Old US 16 east of Ten Sleep	—	—	Fish Hatchery Road
WYO 436	5.93	9.54	US 16 east of Ten Sleep	CR R56 southeast of Ten Sleep	—	—	Rome Hill Road
WYO 450	66.22	106.57	WYO 59 south of Wright	US 16 west of Newcastle	—	—	Little Thunder Road
WYO 451	5.026	8.089	CR 36B west of Osage	US 16 in Osage	—	—	Oil City Road
WYO 452	1.70	2.74	US 16 west of Newcastle	US 16 in Newcastle	—	—	Now US 16 Truck
WYO 487	71.56	115.16	US 30 and US 287 in Medicine Bow	WYO 220 southwest of Casper	—	—	Shirley Basin Road
WYO 514	—	—	—	—	1938	1964	Replaced by WYO 24
WYO 520	100.53	161.79	US 14 in Cody	US 14 in Burgess Junction	1936	1940	Replaced by US 14, former alignment became former WYO 14
WYO 530	45.34	72.97	SR-43 at the Utah State Line	I-80 BL / US 30 Bus. in Green River	—	—	West Flaming Gorge Road
WYO 585	28.05	45.14	US 85 at Four Corners	US 14 and I-90 Bus. in Sundance	1933	current	
WYO 789	407.14	655.23	Colorado state line near Baggs	Montana state line near Frannie	—	—	Canada to Mexico Highway
Former

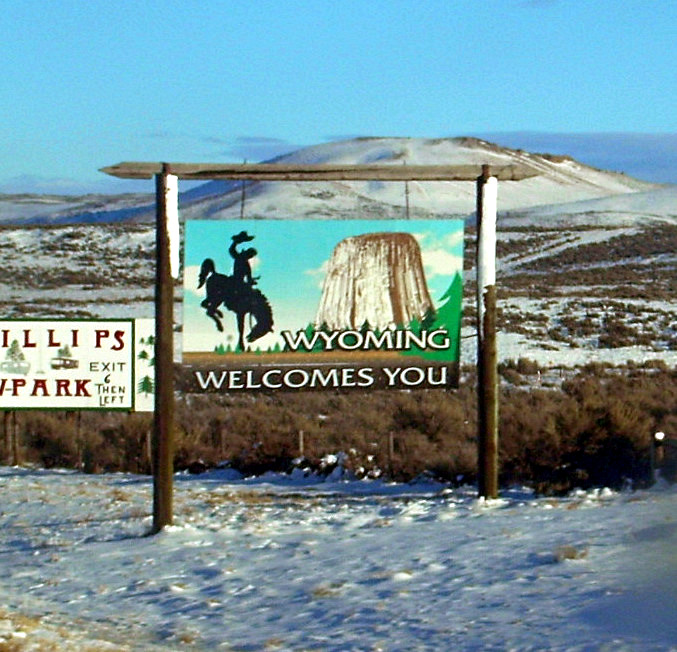
Welcome sign

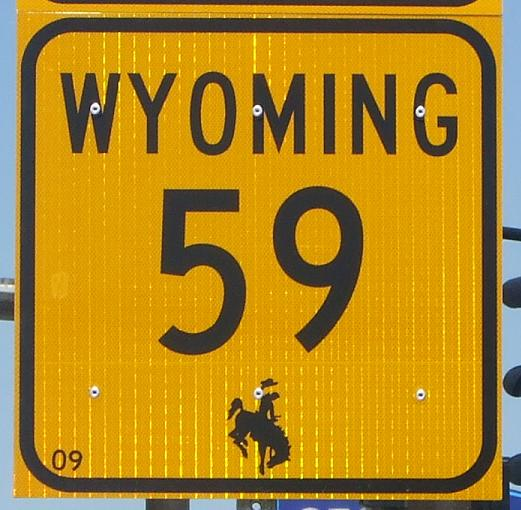
Route marker sign in the field

== Special routes ==
Number	Length (mi)	Length (km)	Southern or western terminus	Northern or eastern terminus	Formed	Removed	Notes
WYO 31 Spur	0.31	0.50	US 16, US 20, and WYO 789 in Manderson	WYO 31 in Manderson	—	—	Spur of WYO 31
WYO 59C	0.45	0.72	WYO 59 in Douglas	WYO 59 in Douglas	—	—	
WYO 319 Spur	0.20	0.32	I-25, US 26, and US 87 in Glendo	WYO 319 in Glendo	—	—	Spur of WYO 319
