= U.S. Route 85 in Wyoming =

Segment of American highway

U.S. Highway 85
- US 85 highlighted in red

Route information
- Maintained by WYDOT
- Length: 256.585 mi (412.934 km)

Major junctions
- South end: US 85 at the Colorado state line near Cheyenne
- I-80 / I-180 / US 30 in Cheyenne; I-25 / US 87 from Cheyenne to Ranchettes; US 26 from Torrington to Lingle; US 18 / US 20 in Lusk; US 16 in Newcastle
- North end: US 85 at the South Dakota state line near Four Corners

Location
- Country: United States
- State: Wyoming
- Counties: Laramie, Goshen, Niobrara, Weston

Highway system
- United States Numbered Highway System; List; Special; Divided; Wyoming State Highway System; Interstate; US; State
← I-80	→ US 87

U.S. Route 85 (US 85) is a part of the U.S. Highway System that travels from the Mexican border in El Paso, Texas, north to the Canadian border in Fortuna, North Dakota. In the state of Wyoming, US 85 begins at the Colorado state line south of Cheyenne and ends at the South Dakota state line northeast of Four Corners.

== Route description ==
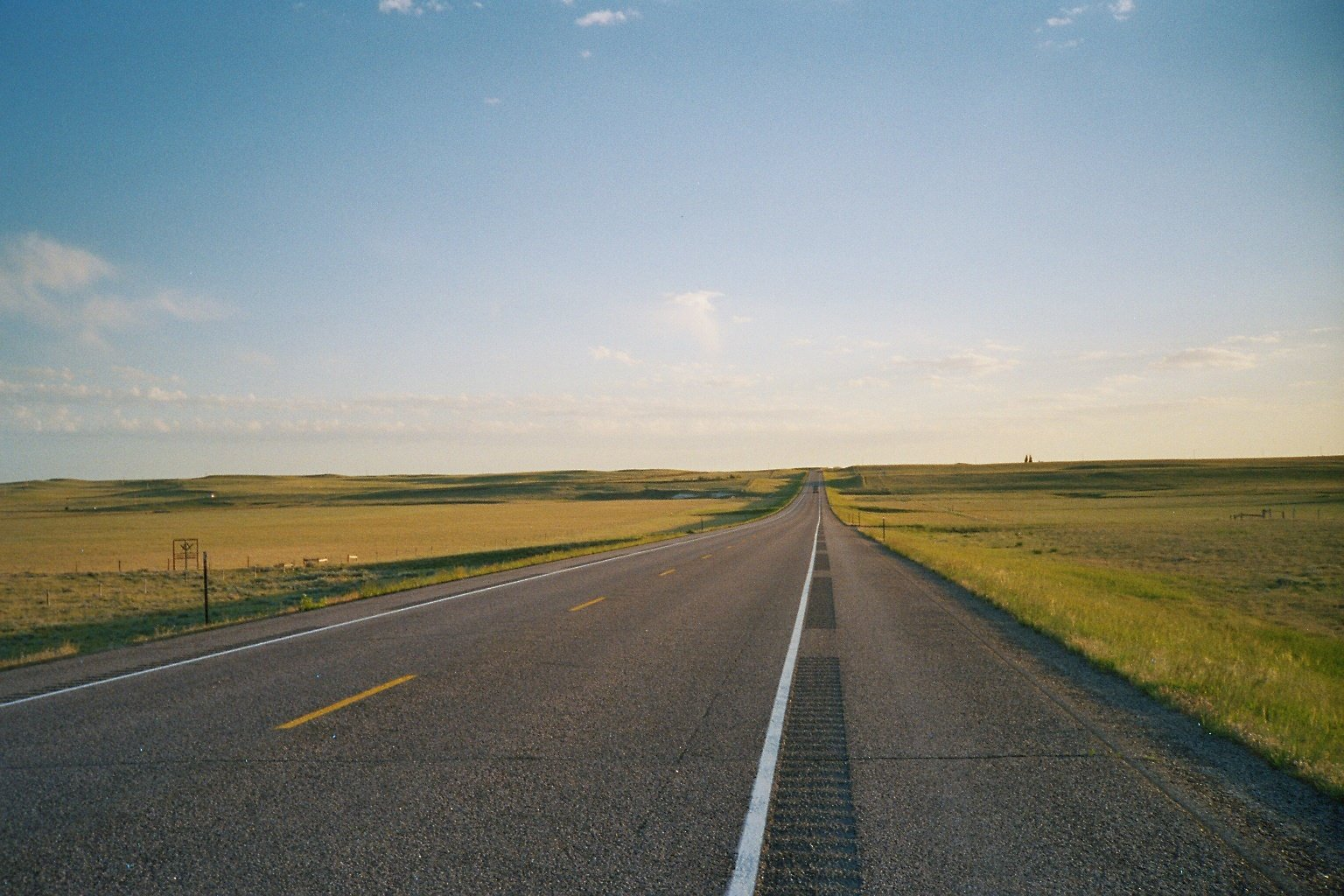
US 85 in Niobrara County

US 85 enters Wyoming from Colorado eight miles (13 km) south of Cheyenne. Just south of the city it joins with US 87 Business, and 1.2 miles (1.9 km) further north it intersects I-80 where it runs concurrently with I-180, the only fully at-grade Interstate Highway in the U.S. The I-180 concurrency ends at I-80 Business and US 30 in downtown Cheyenne before continuing 2.9 miles (4.7 km) to I-25 at exit 12. It joins with I-25 and US 87 in a 4.8-mile (7.7 km) concurrency until US 85 leaves at exit 17 and travels 45 miles (72 km) northeast towards Meriden. From there it heads 39 miles (63 km) north to Torrington, where it meets with US 26 and runs concurrently for 10 miles (16 km) until Lingle. US 85 travels 46 miles (74 km) to Lusk where it meets US 20 and US 18. It shares the next 47 miles (76 km) with US 18 to Mule Creek Junction, and 33 miles (53 km) later meets US 16 near Newcastle. From here it is 29 miles (47 km) until it enters South Dakota in the Black Hills.

== Major intersections ==
County	Location	mi	km	Exit	Destinations	Notes
Laramie		0.000	0.000		US 85 south – Greeley, Denver	Continuation into Colorado
Laramie		4.116	6.624		WYO 223 west (Terry Ranch Road)	
Laramie	South Greeley–Fox Farm-College line	7.307	11.759		I-25 BL south / US 87 Bus. south / WYO 212 (College Drive)	Southern end of I-25 BL/US 87 Bus. concurrency
Laramie	Cheyenne	8.508	13.692		I-180 begins / I-80 to US 30 west – Rock Springs, Sidney	Southern end of I-180 concurrency; I-80 exit 382; I-180 southern terminus
Laramie	Cheyenne	9.595	15.442		I-180 ends / I-80 BL / US 30 (Lincolnway)	Northern end of I-180 concurrency; I-180 northern terminus
Laramie	Cheyenne	11.645	18.741		Yellowstone Road (WYO 219 north)	
Laramie	Cheyenne	12.465	20.060	12	I-25 south / US 87 south – Fort Collins Central Avenue (WYO 224 west) / I-25 BL ends / US 87 Bus. ends – Wyoming Department of Transportation, Game and Fish, Warren AFB, National Guard	Northern end of I-25 BL/US 87 Bus. concurrency; southern end of I-25/US 87 concurrency; exit numbers follow I-25
Laramie	Cheyenne	13.602	21.890	13	Vandehei Avenue	
Laramie	Ranchettes	15.998	25.746	16	WYO 211 (Horse Creek Road)	Access to US 85 north from I-25 south/US 87 south
Laramie	Ranchettes	17.236	27.739	17	I-25 north / US 87 north – Casper	Northern end of I-25/US 87 concurrency; no exit from I-25 south/US 87 south
Laramie	Ranchettes	17.716	28.511		WYO 219 south (Yellowstone Road)	
Laramie		43.081	69.332		WYO 216 east – Albin	
Laramie		46.755	75.245		WYO 213 south – Albin, Burns	
Goshen		62.811	101.085		WYO 151 east – La Grange	
Goshen		69.561	111.948		WYO 313 west – Chugwater	
Goshen		81.605	131.331		WYO 152 west / WYO 154 north – Yoder WYO 161 east – Huntley	
Goshen		90.890	146.273		WYO 92 east – Huntley	Southern end of WYO 92 concurrency
Goshen		91.085	146.587		WYO 154 west – Veteran	
Goshen		92.083	148.193		WYO 156 west – Lingle	
Goshen	Torrington	92.900	149.508		US 85 Bus. north / WYO 92 north (Main Street)	Northern end of WYO 92 concurrency
Goshen	Torrington	93.700	150.796		US 26 east (Valley Road) – Scottsbluff	Southern end of US 26 concurrency
Goshen	Torrington	94.100	151.439		US 85 Bus. south / WYO 92 south (Main Street)	
Goshen	Torrington	94.368	151.871		WYO 159 north (West C Street)	
Goshen	Lingle	103.755	166.977		WYO 156 south	
Goshen	Lingle	103.962	167.311		US 26 west (West 4th Street) – Fort Laramie	Northern end of US 26 concurrency
Niobrara	Lusk	150.164	241.666		US 18 west / US 20 west (8th Street) – Douglas	Southern end of US 18/US 20 concurrency
Niobrara	Lusk	150.665	242.472		US 20 east (3rd Street) – Chadron	Northern end of US 20 concurrency
Niobrara		171.846	276.559		WYO 270 west – Lance Creek	
Niobrara	Mule Creek Junction	196.934	316.935		US 18 east – Edgemont	Northern end of US 18 concurrency
Weston	Newcastle	230.163	370.411		US 16 – Moorcroft, Custer	
Weston	Four Corners	247.328	398.036		WYO 585 north – Sundance	
Weston		256.585	412.934		US 85 north – Lead	Continuation into South Dakota
1.000 mi = 1.609 km; 1.000 km = 0.621 mi: Concurrency terminus

== Related routes ==
- U.S. Route 85 Business (Torrington, Wyoming)

== See also ==
U.S. Route 85
Previous state: Colorado	Wyoming	Next state: South Dakota
