= Wyoming Highway 153 =

Former state highway in Wyoming, United States

Wyoming Highway 153
- WYO 153 highlighted in red

Route information
- Maintained by WYDOT
- Length: 1.02 mi (1.64 km)

Major junctions
- West end: WYO 152 south of Yoder
- East end: CR 133 southeast of Yoder

Location
- Country: United States
- State: Wyoming
- Counties: Goshen

Highway system
- Wyoming State Highway System; Interstate; US; State
← WYO 152	→ WYO 154

Wyoming Highway 153 (WYO 153) was a short 1.02-mile-long (1.64 km) spur route of WYO 152 in central Goshen County, south of the town of Yoder and northwest of Hawk Springs.

== Route description ==
Wyoming Highway 153 began its western end south of Yoder at Wyoming Highway 152 which travels west and north from here. WYO 153 only travelled just over a mile east before ending at Goshen County Route 133. WYO 153 lies north of Springer Reservoir.

== Major intersections ==
The entire route is in Goshen County.

Location	mi	km	Destinations	Notes
	0.00	0.00	WYO 152	
	1.02	1.64	CR 133	
1.000 mi = 1.609 km; 1.000 km = 0.621 mi
