= Goshen County School District Number 1 =

School district in Wyoming, United States

Goshen County School District #1 is a public school district based in Torrington, Wyoming, United States.

== History ==
Ryan Kramer, previously superintendent of West Sioux Community School District in Iowa, became superintendent of the Goshen County No. 1 district as of July 1, 2019. He had visited the county before accepting his position.

== Geography ==
Goshen County School District #1 is the only school district based in Goshen County. It serves most of Goshen County and also extends into a small portion of southeastern Platte County. The following communities are served by the district:

- Incorporated places
  - Town of Fort Laramie
  - Town of LaGrange
  - Town of Lingle
  - City of Torrington
  - Town of Yoder
- Census-designated places (Note: All census-designated places are unincorporated.)
  - Hawk Springs
  - Huntley
  - Veteran
- Unincorporated places
  - Jay Em

== Schools ==
=== High school ===
- Grades 9-12
  - Torrington High School

=== Middle school ===
- Grades 6-8
  - Torrington Middle School

=== Elementary schools ===
- Grades 3-5
  - Trail Elementary School
- Grades K-2
  - Lincoln Elementary School
- Grades K-6
  - La Grange Elementary School

=== K-12 Schools ===
- Lingle-Fort Laramie School
  - High School (9-12)
  - Middle School (6-8)
  - Elementary School (K-5)
- Southeast School - Yoder, WY
  - High School (9-12)
  - Junior High School (7-8)
  - Elementary School (K-6)

== Student demographics ==
The following figures are as of October 1, 2008.

- Total District Enrollment: 1,816
- Student enrollment by gender
  - Male: 932 (51.32%)
  - Female: 884 (48.68%)
- Student enrollment by ethnicity
  - White (not Hispanic): 1,510 (83.10%)
  - Hispanic: 268 (14.76%)
  - American Indian or Alaskan Native: 26 (1.43%)
  - Black (not Hispanic): 9 (0.50%)
  - Asian or Pacific Islander: 3 (0.17%)

== See also ==
- List of school districts in Wyoming
