= KEMM =

KEMM may refer to:

- KEMM (FM), a defunct radio station (91.1 FM) formerly licensed to serve Opal, Wyoming, United States, whose license was cancelled November 16, 2012
- Kemmerer Municipal Airport (ICAO code KEMM)
