= Wyoming Highway 313 =

State highway in Wyoming, United States

Wyoming Highway 313
- WYO 313 highlighted in red

Route information
- Maintained by WYDOT
- Length: 30.81 mi (49.58 km)

Major junctions
- West end: WYO 321 in Chugwater
- East end: US 85 south of Hawk Springs

Location
- Country: United States
- State: Wyoming
- Counties: Platte, Goshen

Highway system
- Wyoming State Highway System; Interstate; US; State
← WYO 312	→ WYO 314

Wyoming Highway 313 (WYO 313) is a 30.81-mile-long (49.58 km) Wyoming State Road located in southeastern Platte County and southwestern Goshen County that provides travel between Chugwater and Interstate 25 to US 85 south of Hawk Springs.

== Route description ==
Wyoming Highway 313 begins at its west end at Wyoming Highway 321 Interstate 25 Business). WYO 313 travels 30.2 miles (48.6 km) to US 85 near Hawk Springs State Recreation Area, south of Hawk Springs.

== Major intersections ==
County	Location	mi	km	Destinations	Notes
Platte	Chugwater	0.000	0.000	WYO 321 (I-25 BL) to I-25	Western terminus; road continues as Clay Avenue
Goshen		30.20	48.60	US 85 – Torrington, Cheyenne	Eastern terminus
1.000 mi = 1.609 km; 1.000 km = 0.621 mi
