= Wyoming Highway 92 =

State highway Goshen County, Wyoming, United States

Wyoming Highway 92
- WYO 92 highlighted in red

Route information
- Maintained by WYDOT
- Length: 16.47 mi (26.51 km)

Major junctions
- West end: US 26 / US 85 in Torrington
- US 85 near Torrington
- East end: N-92 at the Nebraska state line in Lyman, NE

Location
- Country: United States
- State: Wyoming
- Counties: Goshen

Highway system
- Wyoming State Highway System; Interstate; US; State
| ← WYO 91 | → WYO 93 |

Wyoming Highway 92 (WYO 92) is a 16.47-mile-long (26.51 km) Wyoming state highway in eastern Goshen County that travels from Torrington to the Nebraska state line. It is part of a continuous 886-mile (1,426 km) four-state "Highway 92" which begins in Wyoming, goes through Nebraska and Iowa, and ends in La Moille, Illinois.

== Route description ==
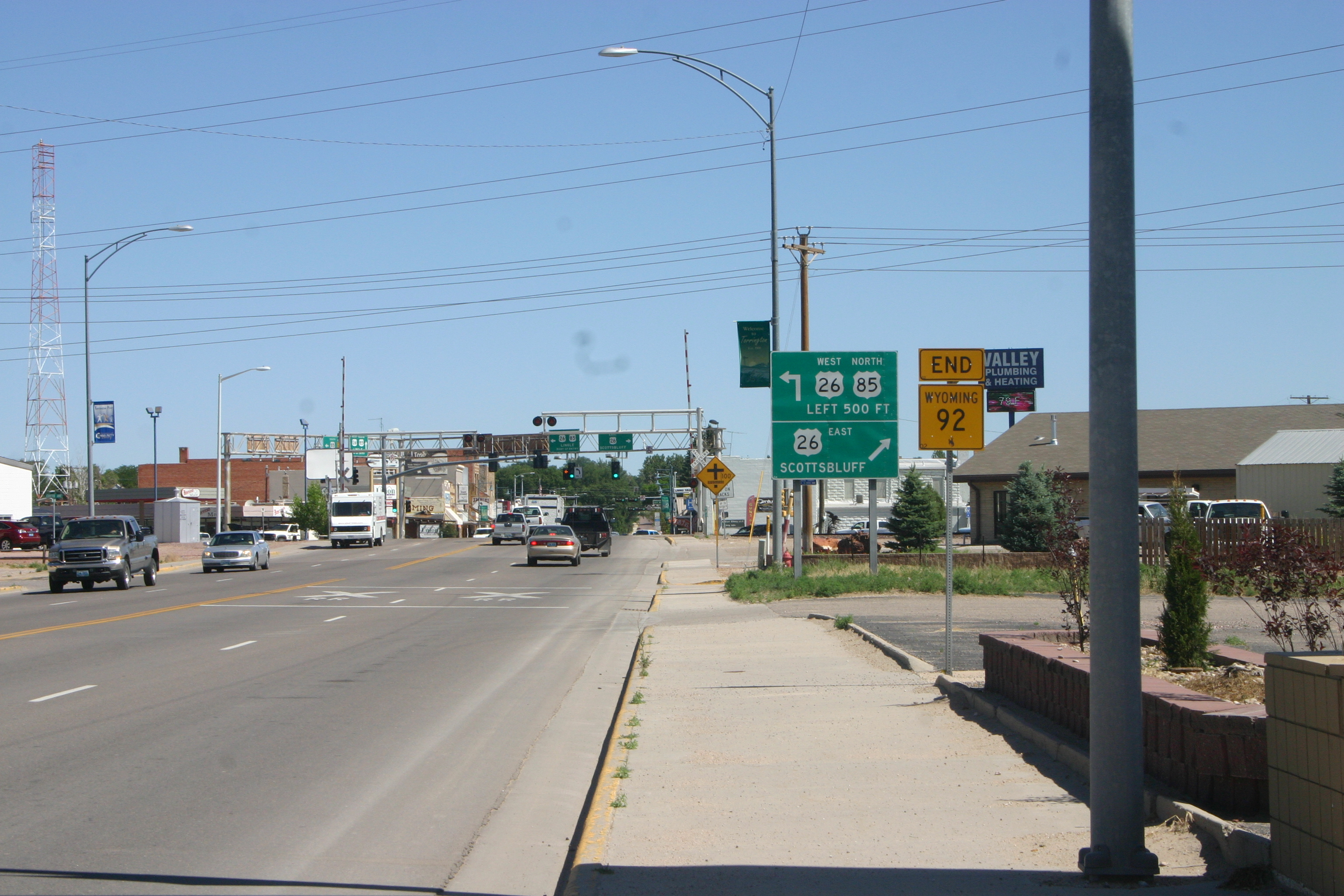
Sign marking the western end of Wyoming Highway 92, in Torrington WY.

Highway 92 begins the 886-mile (1,426 km) four-state "Highway 92" in downtown Torrington at an intersection with U.S. Routes 26 and 85. Highway 92 proceeds southward, concurrent with US 85 Business. In one half-mile Highway 92 intersects mainline US 85 again, where US 85 Business ends and the concurrency with the mainline begins. The routes cross the North Platte River and intersects the eastern terminus of Highway 156 in an area known as South Torrington. Leaving Torrington, the highway intersects the northern end of Highway 154 before splitting off from US 85. US 85 then continues south toward Cheyenne while Highway 92 turns east. Highway 92 travels southeasterly to the community of Huntley, a Census-designated place (CDP), where it intersects the eastern terminus of Highway 161 as the road turns east. Highway 92 zigzags southeast of Huntley where it intersects the western (northern) terminus of Highway 158 as it heads for the Nebraska state line. At the Nebraska state border near Lyman, Nebraska the roadway continues east as Nebraska Highway 92. It eventually connects to Iowa Highway 92 and to Illinois Route 92.

Wyoming Highway 92 follows State Control Number 807 for its entire length

== Major intersections ==
The entire route is in Goshen County.

| Location | mi | km | Destinations | Notes |
|---|---|---|---|---|
| Torrington | 0.00 | 0.00 | US 26 / US 85 / US 85 Bus. ends – Lingle, Scottsbluff | WYO 92 western terminus / US 85 Bus. northern terminus |
| Torrington | 0.50 | 0.80 | US 85 north / US 85 Bus. begins – Lingle, Scottsbluff | US 85 Bus. southern terminus; western end of US 85 concurrency; eastern end of US 85 Bus. concurrency |
| Torrington | 1.20 | 1.93 | WYO 156 west | |
| | 2.20 | 3.54 | WYO 154 south – Veteran | |
| | 2.40 | 3.86 | US 85 south – Cheyenne | Eastern end of US 85 concurrency |
| Huntley | 10.69 | 17.20 | WYO 161 west | |
| | 13.39 | 21.55 | WYO 158 east | |
| | 16.47 | 26.51 | N-92 east – Lyman | WYO 92 eastern terminus; continuation into Nebraska |
1.000 mi = 1.609 km; 1.000 km = 0.621 mi: Concurrency terminus
