= Wyoming Highway 233 =

State highway in Lincoln County, Wyoming, United States

Wyoming Highway 233
- WYO 233 highlighted in red

Route information
- Maintained by WYDOT
- Length: 19.29 mi (31.04 km)

Major junctions
- South end: US 189 in Kemmerer
- North end: CR 305 near Viva Naughton Reservoir

Location
- Country: United States
- State: Wyoming
- Counties: Lincoln

Highway system
- Wyoming State Highway System; Interstate; US; State
← WYO 232	→ WYO 235

Wyoming Highway 233 (WYO 233) is a 19.29-mile-long (31.04 km) state highway in south-central Lincoln County, Wyoming that serves the town of Frontier and outlying areas to the northwest, including the Viva Naughton Reservoir. In addition WYO 233 provides access to the Kemmerer Municipal Airport.

== Route description ==
Wyoming Highway 233 begins its southern end at U.S. Route 189 at the northern city limits of Kemmerer. WYO 233 passes the Island Golf Club as it turns north from US 189. Almost immediately after, WYO 233 leaves Kemmerer and enters the small unincorporated community of Frontier. Just past Frontier, Airport Road (former WYO 234) is intersected at 1.10-mile (1.8 km) and provides access to the Kemmerer Municipal Airport. Past the airport spur, Highway 233 travels in a more northwesterly direction toward the Viva Naughton Reservoir which it reaches at just over 14 miles. Running along the east side of the reservoir, Highway 233 reaches its northern terminus at Lincoln County Route 305 (Ham Forks Road) at 19.29-mile (31.0 km). CR 305 continues beyond Lake Viva Haughton and leads to the Commissary Ridge of the Bridger-Teton National Forest.

== Major intersections ==
The entire route is in Lincoln County.

Location	mi	km	Destinations	Notes
Kemmerer	0.00	0.00	US 189	
	1.10	1.77	Airport Road	Former WYO 234
	19.29	31.04	CR 305 (Hams Fork Road)	Continuation beyond northern terminus
1.000 mi = 1.609 km; 1.000 km = 0.621 mi
