= Wyoming Highway 161 =

State highway in Wyoming, United States

Wyoming Highway 161
- WYO 161 highlighted in red

Route information
- Maintained by WYDOT
- Length: 7.03 mi (11.31 km)

Major junctions
- West end: US 85 / WYO 152 near Yoder
- East end: WYO 92 in Huntley

Location
- Country: United States
- State: Wyoming
- Counties: Goshen

Highway system
- Wyoming State Highway System; Interstate; US; State
← WYO 160	→ WYO 170

Wyoming Highway 161 (WYO 161) is a 7.03-mile-long (11.31 km) Wyoming State Road located in eastern Goshen County and travels from an intersection with U.S. Route 85 (US 85) and WYO 152 near Yoder east to WYO 92 at Huntley.

== Route description ==
Wyoming Highway 161 is a 7.03-mile-long (11.31 km) highway that begins its west end at US 85 and the eastern terminus of WYO 152 just east of the town of Yoder (WYO 152 continues west). WYO 161 heads east, turns north briefly at approximately 3 miles, but quickly turns back east. For its entire length, WYO 161 travels through farmland and only intersects county and local roads. Highway 161 reaches its end at WYO 92 in the community of Huntley.

== Major intersections ==
The entire route is in Goshen County.

Location	mi	km	Destinations	Notes
Yoder	0.00	0.00	US 85 / WYO 152 west	Western terminus; eastern terminus of WYO 152
Huntley	7.03	11.31	WYO 92	Eastern terminus
1.000 mi = 1.609 km; 1.000 km = 0.621 mi
