= Wyoming Highway 152 =

Former state highway in Wyoming, United States

Wyoming Highway 152
- WYO 152 highlighted in red

Route information
- Maintained by WYDOT
- Length: 9.80 mi (15.77 km)

Major junctions
- West end: CR 124 southwest of Yoder
- East end: US 85/ WYO 161 near Yoder

Location
- Country: United States
- State: Wyoming
- Counties: Goshen

Highway system
- Wyoming State Highway System; Interstate; US; State
← WYO 151	→ WYO 153

Wyoming Highway 152 (WYO 152) was a 9.80-mile-long (15.77 km) Wyoming State Road located in central Goshen County that served the community of Yoder and areas south and west of the community.

== Route description ==
Wyoming Highway 152 began its western end southwest of Yoder at an intersection with three Goshen county routes; County Route 124 (west), County Route 128 (south), and County Route 202 (north). From there Highway 152 headed east until it intersected the western terminus of Wyoming Highway 153, where then WYO 152 turned north towards Yoder. WYO 152 turned east then north again before reaching Yoder and intersected the southern end of Wyoming Highway 154 in Yoder. WYO 154 heads west, as WYO 152 turned east and left Yoder, crossing the Fort Laramie Canal a mile before reaching its eastern end at an intersection with U.S. Route 85 and Wyoming Highway 161 just east of Yoder.

== Major intersections ==
The entire route is in Goshen County.

Location	mi	km	Destinations	Notes
	0.00	0.00	CR 124	Continuation beyond western terminus
	3.94	6.34	WYO 153	Western terminus of WYO 153
	7.85	12.63	WYO 154	Southern terminus of WYO 154
	9.80	15.77	US 85	
	9.80	15.77	WYO 161 east	Continuation beyond eastern terminus; western terminus of WYO 161
1.000 mi = 1.609 km; 1.000 km = 0.621 mi
