= Wyoming Highway 160 =

State highway in Wyoming, United States

Wyoming Highway 160
- WYO 160 highlighted in red

Route information
- Maintained by WYDOT
- Length: 1.08 mi (1.74 km)

Major junctions
- West end: CR 53 west of Fort Laramie
- East end: US 26 in Fort Laramie

Location
- Country: United States
- State: Wyoming
- Counties: Goshen

Highway system
- Wyoming State Highway System; Interstate; US; State
← WYO 159	→ WYO 161

Wyoming Highway 160 (WYO 160) is a short 1.08-mile-long (1.74 km) east–west Wyoming State Road located in western Goshen County in the town of Fort Laramie.

== Route description ==
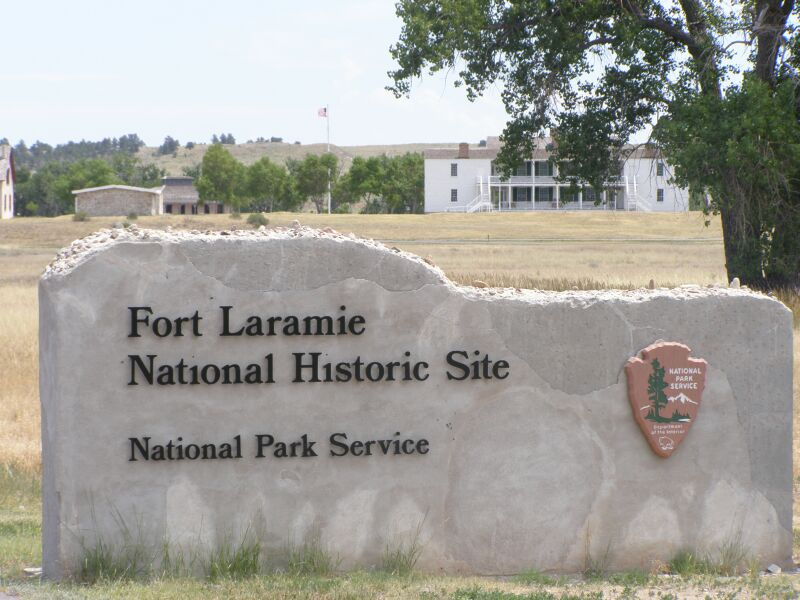
Entrance to Fort Laramie National Historic Site

Wyoming Highway 160 is a short route at only 1.08 miles (1.74 km) in length that provides access to the Fort Laramie National Historic Site and areas west and southwest of Fort Laramie. Highway 160 begins at Goshen CR 53 and travels east, passing north of the Fort Laramie Historic Site. WYO 160 crosses the North Platte River before reaching Fort Laramie where the highway ends at US Route 26 (Merriam Street).

== History ==
Wyoming Highway 160 may have previously been routed all the way to Interstate 25 (Exit 80) in Wheatland. WYO 160 would have traveled south of Grayrocks Reservoir to Wheatland. The roadway today appears to be a county-maintained road.

== Major intersections ==
The entire route is in Goshen County.

Location	mi	km	Destinations	Notes
	0.00	0.00	CR 53	Continuation beyond western terminus
Fort Laramie	1.08	1.74	US 26	
1.000 mi = 1.609 km; 1.000 km = 0.621 mi
