= Torrington Municipal Airport =

- IATA: TOR; ICAO: KTOR; FAA LID: TOR

Summary
- Airport type: Public
- Owner: City of Torrington
- Serves: Torrington, Wyoming
- Elevation AMSL: 4,207 ft / 1,282 m
- Coordinates: 42°03′52″N 104°09′10″W

Map

Runways
Direction	Length		Surface
Direction	ft	m	Surface
10/28	5,703	1,738	Asphalt
2/20	3,401	1,037	Asphalt

Statistics (2011)
- Aircraft operations (year ending 5/31/2023): 3,842
- Based aircraft: 27
- Source: Federal Aviation Administration

Torrington Municipal Airport (IATA: TOR, ICAO: KTOR, FAA LID: TOR) is two miles east of Torrington, in Goshen County, Wyoming. The National Plan of Integrated Airport Systems for 2011–2015 categorized it as a general aviation facility.

== Facilities ==
The airport covers 517 acres (209 ha) at an elevation of 4,207 feet (1,282 m). It has two asphalt runways: 10/28 is 5,703 by 75 feet (1,738 x 23 m) and 2/20 is 3,401 by 60 feet (1,037 x 18 m).

In the year ending May 31, 2023 the airport had 3,842 aircraft operations, average 74 per week: 94% general aviation, 5% air taxi, and <1% military. 27 aircraft were then based at this airport: 24 single-engine, 2 multi-engine and 1 helicopter.

== See also ==
- List of airports in Wyoming
