= W. G. Curtis =

American politician

W. G. Curtis was a farmer and politician in the U.S. state of Wyoming in the late 19th century, having served in the Wyoming State Legislature representing Laramie County.

Curtis is credited with founding the town of Torrington, Wyoming. The first post office was built in 1889 on the western part of Curtis's farm, approximately a mile from the current town. Curtis, serving as the first postmaster, named the town after Torrington, Connecticut, where he and his family had formerly lived. Curtis was also mayor of Torrington for two terms and served in the Wyoming State Legislature in 1903.
