= Wyoming Highway 154 =

State highway in Wyoming, United States

Wyoming Highway 154
- WYO 154 highlighted in red

Route information
- Maintained by WYDOT
- Length: 21.11 mi (33.97 km)

Major junctions
- South end: WYO 152 in Yoder
- North end: US 85 / WYO 92 in Torrington

Location
- Country: United States
- State: Wyoming
- Counties: Goshen

Highway system
- Wyoming State Highway System; Interstate; US; State
← WYO 153	→ WYO 156

Wyoming Highway 154 (WYO 154) is a 21.11-mile-long (33.97 km) Wyoming State Road located in central Goshen County that serves the communities of Veteran and Yoder southwest of Torrington.

== Route description ==
Wyoming Highway 154 has a "C" like routing from its southern end at Wyoming Highway 152 in Yoder to US Route 85 south of Torrington. From WYO 152, Highway 154 heads west, continuing where WYO 152 leaves off. Highway 154 soon turns north to head to the community of Veteran, a Census-designated place (CDP) northwest of Yoder at just over 7 miles. WYO 154 passes through Veteran then heads northeast to US Route 85/Wyoming Highway 92 just south of the city of Torrington where it ends.

== Major intersections ==
The entire route is in Goshen County.

Location	mi	km	Destinations	Notes
Yoder	0.00	0.00	WYO 152	Southern terminus of WYO 154
Torrington	21.11	33.97	US 85 / WYO 92	Northern terminus of WYO 154
1.000 mi = 1.609 km; 1.000 km = 0.621 mi
