= Wyoming Highway 158 =

State highway in Wyoming, United States

Wyoming Highway 158
- WYO 158 highlighted in red

Route information
- Maintained by WYDOT
- Length: 8.02 mi (12.91 km)

Major junctions
- West end: WYO 92 southeast of Huntley
- East end: Kiowa Church Road/County Road 63 at Wyoming–Nebraska state line

Location
- Country: United States
- State: Wyoming
- Counties: Goshen

Highway system
- Wyoming State Highway System; Interstate; US; State
← WYO 157	→ WYO 159

Wyoming Highway 158 (WYO 158) is a 8.02-mile-long (12.91 km) Wyoming State Road located in eastern Goshen County from WYO 92 to the Nebraska state line.

== Route description ==
Wyoming Highway 158 travels from Wyoming Highway 92, southeast of Huntley, due south for 4.98 miles (8.01 km). Then WYO 158 turns east, passing farmland for its entirety, to head for the Nebraska state line. At 8.02 miles (12.91 km), WYO 158 reaches the state line where the designation ends as well as the blacktop. WYO 158 ends at County Road 63. south of Lyman, Nebraska, and Nebraska Highway 92. The roadway continues east as Kiowa Church Road.

== Major intersections ==
The entire route is in Goshen County.

Location	mi	km	Destinations	Notes
	0.00	0.00	WYO 92	
	8.02	12.91	Kiowa Church Road/County Road 63	Continuation beyond Nebraska state line
1.000 mi = 1.609 km; 1.000 km = 0.621 mi
