= Wyoming Highway 156 =

State highway in Wyoming, United States

Wyoming Highway 156
- WYO 156 highlighted in red

Route information
- Maintained by WYDOT
- Length: 14.29 mi (23.00 km)

Major junctions
- West end: US 26 / US 85 in Lingle
- East end: US 85 / WYO 92 in Torrington

Location
- Country: United States
- State: Wyoming
- Counties: Goshen

Highway system
- Wyoming State Highway System; Interstate; US; State
← WYO 154	→ WYO 157

Wyoming Highway 156 (WYO 156) is a 14.29-mile-long (23.00 km) Wyoming State Road located in central Goshen County west of Torrington and south of Lingle.

== Route description ==
Wyoming Highway 156 is an L-shaped route that runs generally east–west between Lingle and Torrington. Highway 156 begins it western terminus at US 26/US 85 (Main Street) in Lingle, and from there WYO 156 proceeds due south as the western section runs north–south. The eastern terminus of Wyoming Highway 157 is intersected a just under two-tenths of a miles. WYO 156 travels south, crossing the North Platte River at approximately 2 miles. After crossing the river, WYO 156 begins to head in a more east–west direction and serves the southern bank of the North Platte River. Highway 156 again turns south, but then turns back east, and stays in an east–west direction for the remainder of its routing. WYO 156 comes to its eastern end at US 85/WYO 92 (Main Street) in the city of Torrington, in an area called South Torrington, just north of the US 85/WYO 154 junction.

Mileposts increase from east to west along WYO 156.

== Major intersections ==
The entire route is in Goshen County.

Location	mi	km	Destinations	Notes
Lingle	0.00	0.00	US 26 / US 85	Western terminus of WYO 156
Lingle	0.17	0.27	WYO 157	Eastern terminus of WYO 157
Torrington	14.29	23.00	US 85 / WYO 92	Eastern terminus of WYO 156
1.000 mi = 1.609 km; 1.000 km = 0.621 mi
