= Wyoming Highway 151 =

State highway in Wyoming, United States

Wyoming Highway 151
- LaGrange Road
- WYO 151 highlighted in red

Route information
- Maintained by WYDOT
- Length: 9.89 mi (15.92 km)

Major junctions
- West end: US 85 west of LaGrange
- East end: N-88 at the Nebraska state line near LaGrange

Location
- Country: United States
- State: Wyoming
- Counties: Goshen

Highway system
- Wyoming State Highway System; Interstate; US; State
← WYO 150	→ WYO 152

Wyoming Highway 151 (WYO 151) is a 9.89-mile-long (15.92 km) Wyoming State Road, known as LaGrange Road, that is located in extreme southeastern Goshen County.

== Route description ==
WYO 151 runs east–west from US 85 west of LaGrange to the Nebraska-Wyoming State Line. Once it crosses into Nebraska it becomes Nebraska Highway 88, which links to the Heartland Expressway Corridor (Nebraska Highway 71) just south of the Scottsbluff - Gering area. Mileposts along WYO 151 increase from west to east. Wyoming Highway 151 passes through La Grange between Mileposts 3.84 and 4.34.

== Major intersections ==
The entire route is in Goshen County.

Location	mi	km	Destinations	Notes
	0.00	0.00	US 85	
	9.89	15.92	N-88	Continuation beyond Nebraska state line
1.000 mi = 1.609 km; 1.000 km = 0.621 mi
