= United States Post Office (Torrington, Wyoming) =

- US Post Office--Torrington Main
- U.S. National Register of Historic Places
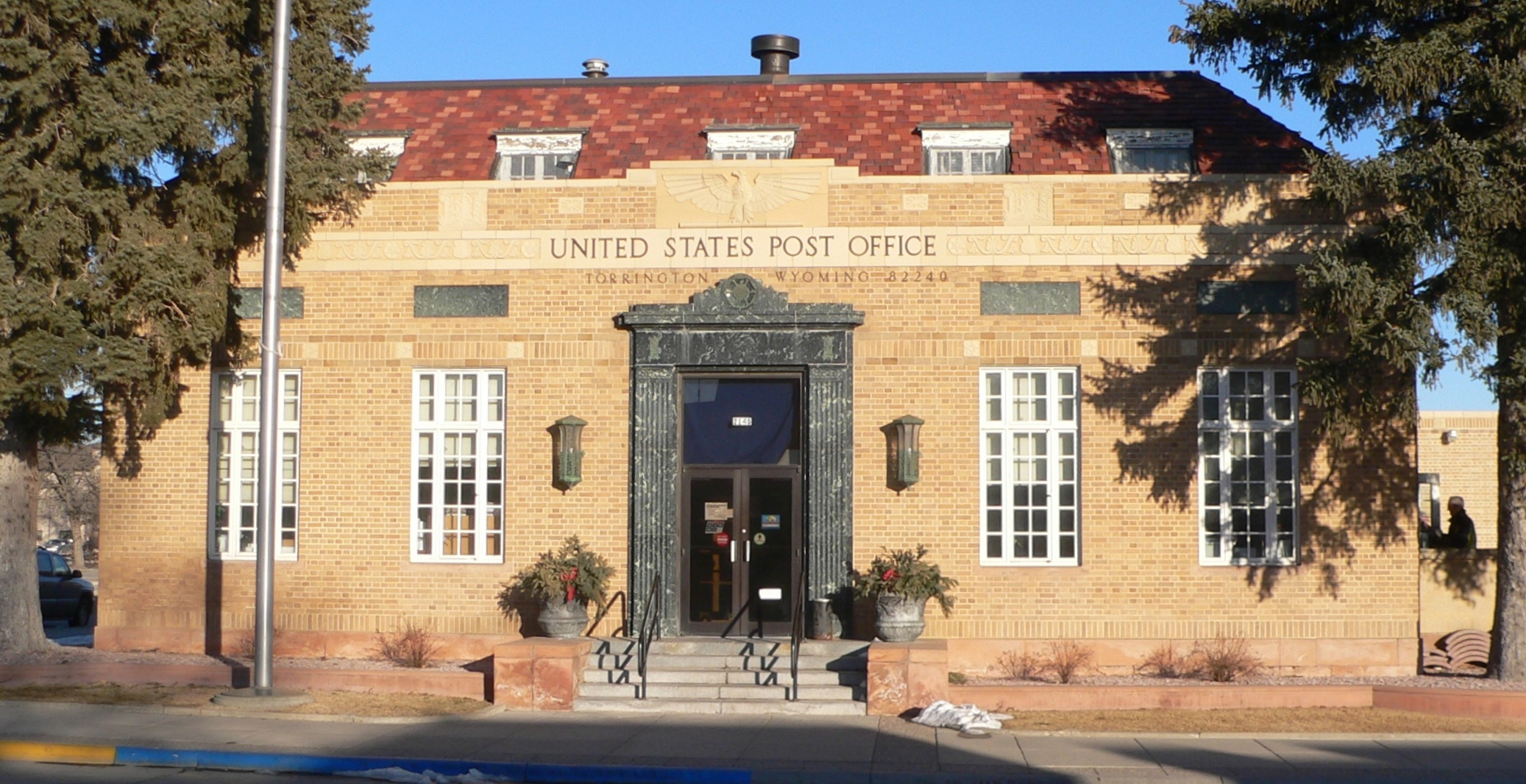

- Location within Wyoming Location within the United States
- Location: 2145 Main St., Torrington, Wyoming
- Coordinates: 42°3′57.1″N 104°11′2.5″W
- Built: 1932
- Architect: US Department of the Treasury; Office of Supervising Architect
- Architectural style: Classical Revival, Art Deco
- MPS: Historic US Post Offices in Wyoming, 1900--1941, TR
- NRHP reference No.: 87000783
- Added to NRHP: May 19, 1987

The Torrington Main Post Office in Torrington, Wyoming was built in 1932 as part of a facilities improvement program by the United States Post Office Department. The post office in Torrington was nominated to the National Register of Historic Places as part of a thematic study comprising twelve Wyoming post offices built to standardized USPO plans in the early twentieth century.
