= Wyoming Highway 219 =

State highway in Wyoming, United States

Wyoming Highway 219
- Yellowstone Road
- WYO 219 highlighted in red

Route information
- Maintained by WYDOT
- Length: 5.48 mi (8.82 km)

Major junctions
- South end: I-25 BL / US 85 in Cheyenne.
- WYO 212 north of Cheyenne; WYO 211 north of Cheyenne
- North end: US 85 north of Cheyenne

Location
- Country: United States
- State: Wyoming
- Counties: Laramie

Highway system
- Wyoming State Highway System; Interstate; US; State
| ← WYO 218 | → WYO 220 |

Wyoming Highway 219 (WYO 219), also known as Yellowstone Road, is a 5.48-mile (8.82 km) north–south state highway in central Laramie County, Wyoming, United States, that forms an eastern loop off of U.S. Route 85 (US 85).

== Route description ==
WYO 219 runs from Central Avenue (Business Loop I-25/US 85/US 87 Business) in Cheyenne north to Torrington Road (US 85), near Interstate 25 (I-25) Exit 17 north of Cheyenne. WYO 219 runs parallel to I-25 between Exits 13 and 17, and it is the old alignment of US 85/US 87.

Yellowstone Road continues north as Laramie County Route 124 (Old Yellowstone Road) to the Platte–Laramie county line.

== Major intersections ==
The entire route is in Laramie County.

| Location | mi | km | Destinations | Notes |
|---|---|---|---|---|
| Cheyenne | 0.00 | 0.00 | I-25 BL / US 85 / US 87 Bus. (Central Avenue) – Capital Complex, Downtown | Southern terminus |
| Ranchettes | 2.00 | 3.22 | WYO 212 (Four Mile Road) | |
| Ranchettes | 4.00 | 6.44 | WYO 211 west (Iron Mountain Road) to I-25 | Eastern terminus of WYO 211 |
| Ranchettes | 5.48 | 8.82 | US 85 (Torrington Road) / CR 124 north | Northern terminus; roadway continues as CR 124 |
1.000 mi = 1.609 km; 1.000 km = 0.621 mi

== See also ==
- List of state highways in Wyoming
- List of highways numbered 219
