= Wyoming Highway 150 =

State highway in Wyoming, United States

Wyoming Highway 150
- WYO 150 highlighted in red

Route information
- Maintained by WYDOT
- Length: 23.05 mi (37.10 km)

Major junctions
- South end: SR-150 at the Utah state line
- North end: I-80 / US 189; WYO 89 in Evanston

Location
- Country: United States
- State: Wyoming
- Counties: Uinta

Highway system
- Wyoming State Highway System; Interstate; US; State
← WYO 139	→ WYO 151

Wyoming Highway 150 (WYO 150) is a 23.05-mile-long (37.10 km) north–south Wyoming State Road that runs from the Wyoming–Utah state border to north to Evanston. It is the Wyoming portion of the Mirror Lake Scenic Byway.

== Route description ==
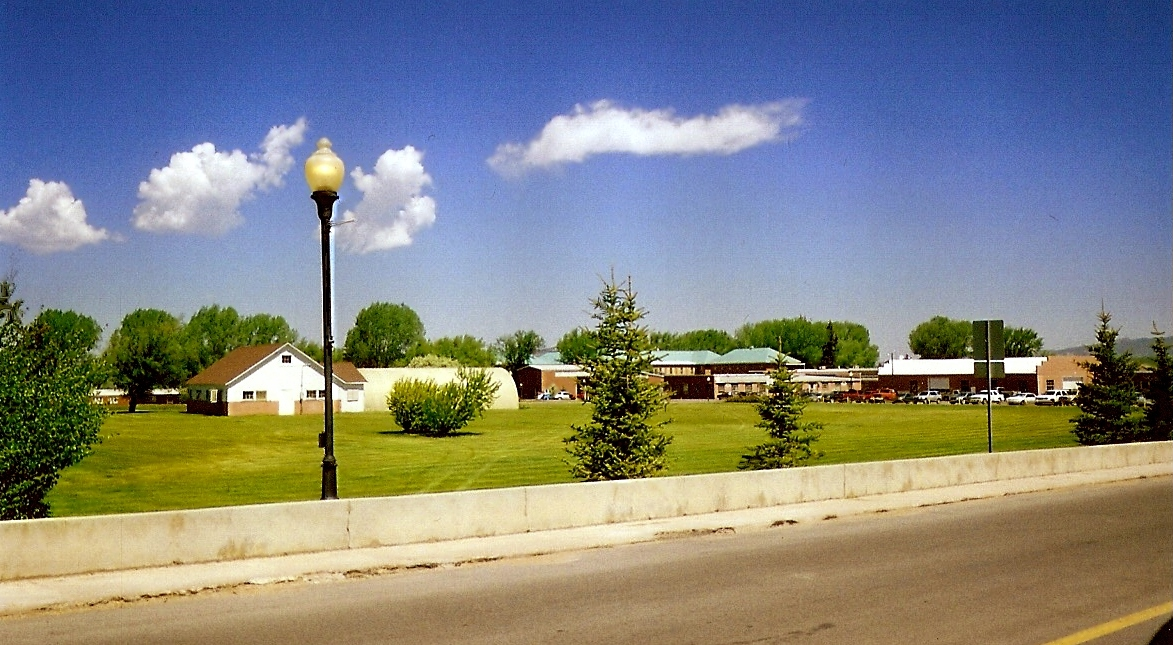
Wyoming State Hospital along Highway 150

Wyoming Highway 150 is the continuation of Utah State Route 150 along the Mirror Lake Scenic Byway. WYO 150 travels north toward Evanston, passing through the community of Beartown and west of Sulphur Springs Reservoir. Highway 150 enters Evanston from the south, passing the Wyoming State Hospital before reaching its northern end at an interchange shared with the southern terminus of Wyoming Highway 89 at exit 5 of Interstate 80/US Route 189. Wyoming Highway 89 takes over as the roadway north of I-80/US 189.

The Mirror Lake Scenic Byway over the Uinta Mountains in Utah is closed during the winter. However, Wyoming Highway 150 remains open except during harsh conditions. Wyoming 150 follows State Control Route 2100 for its entire length.

== Major intersections ==
The entire route is in Uinta County.

Location	mi	km	Destinations	Notes
	0.00	0.00	SR-150 south – Kamas	Continuation into Utah
Evanston	23.05	37.10	I-80 / US 189 – Salt Lake, Rock Springs WYO 89 north (Front Street)	I-80 exit 5; highway continues as WYO 89
1.000 mi = 1.609 km; 1.000 km = 0.621 mi: Route transition
