= Wyoming Highway 159 =

State highway in Wyoming, United States

Wyoming Highway 159
- WYO 159 highlighted in red

Route information
- Maintained by WYDOT, City of Torrington
- Length: 12.78 mi (20.57 km)

Major junctions
- South end: US 26 / US 85 in Torrington
- North end: CR 47 north of Torrington

Location
- Country: United States
- State: Wyoming
- Counties: Goshen

Highway system
- Wyoming State Highway System; Interstate; US; State
← WYO 158	→ WYO 160

Wyoming Highway 159 (WYO 159) is a 12.78-mile-long (20.57 km) north-south Wyoming State Road located in east-central Goshen County and travels north of Torrington.

== Route description ==
Wyoming Highway 159 begins at US 26/US 85 (Valley Road W.) and from there travels north through the western parts of Torrington named W. C Street . The first 0.45-mile (0.7 km) through the city is maintained by the city of Torrington. State maintenance begins at Milepost 0.45. WYO 159 reaches the city limits at 1.43 miles. Just north of Torrington, at approximately 2.6 miles, WYO 159 turns west but back north again a mile later. Highway 159 crosses the Interstate Canal afterward, which provides water for farmland irrigation that comes from the Whalen Diversion Dam near Fort Laramie. For the remaining miles north of the canal, WYO 159 travels through prairie land till its end at Milepost 12.78 at an intersection with Goshen CR 233.

== Major intersections ==
The entire route is in Goshen County.

Location	mi	km	Destinations	Notes
Torrington	0.00	0.00	US 26 / US 85	
	12.78	20.57	CR 47	
1.000 mi = 1.609 km; 1.000 km = 0.621 mi
