= Four Corners, Wyoming =

Unincoporated community in Weston County, Wyoming, United States

- Unincorporated community
- Location within the state of Wyoming Four Corners (the United States)
- Coordinates: 44°04′39″N 104°08′18″W
- Country: United States
- State: Wyoming
- County: Weston
- Elevation: 5,853 ft (1,784 m)
- Time zone: UTC-7 (Mountain (MST))
  - Summer (DST): UTC-6 (MDT)
- ZIP code: 82715
- Area code: 307
- GNIS feature ID: 1599816

Four Corners is an unincorporated community in Weston County, Wyoming, United States.

== Description ==
Four Corners is located in northeastern Wyoming near the Bear Lodge Mountains, part of the Black Hills, at the intersection of U.S. Route 85 and Wyoming Highway 585. It is located north of Newcastle, southeast of Sundance, Wyoming, and southwest of Lead, South Dakota. Originally a stage station on the famous stagecoach road Cheyenne Black Hills Stage Route connecting Cheyenne and the Union Pacific Railroad with the gold fields of Deadwood, it is today the site of a small store, bed-and-breakfast ranches, vacation homes, and tourist camps.
