= Goshen County, Wyoming =

County in Wyoming, United States

- County
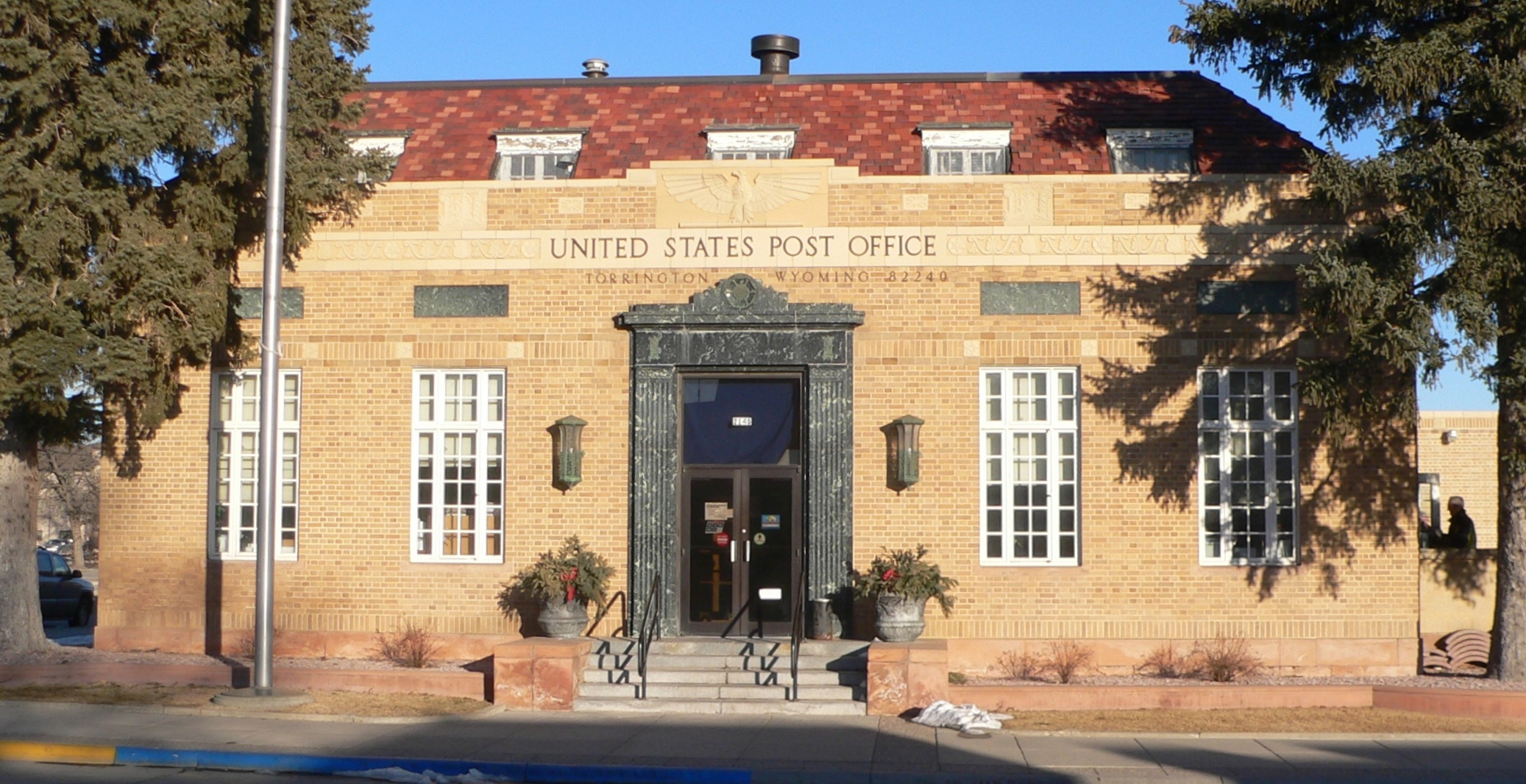
- United States Post Office (Torrington, Wyoming)

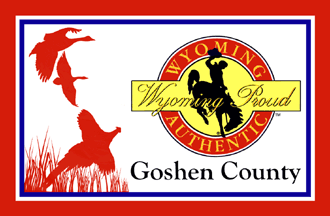
- Flag

- Location within the U.S. state of Wyoming
- Coordinates: 42°05′N 104°22′W
- Country: United States
- State: Wyoming
- Founded: February 21, 1911 (authorized); 1913 (organized)
- Named for: Land of Goshen
- Seat: Torrington
- Largest city: Torrington

Area
  - Total: 2,232 sq mi (5,780 km^{2})
  - Land: 2,225 sq mi (5,760 km^{2})
  - Water: 6.8 sq mi (18 km^{2}) 0.3%

Population (2020)
  - Total: 12,498
  - Estimate (2025): 12,640 ▲
  - Density: 5.617/sq mi (2.169/km^{2})
- Time zone: UTC−7 (Mountain)
  - Summer (DST): UTC−6 (MDT)
- Congressional district: At-large
- Website: www.goshencountywy.gov

Goshen County (/ˈɡoʊʃən/, GOH-shən) is a county in the U.S. state of Wyoming. As of the 2020 United States census, the population was 12,498. Its county seat is Torrington. The eastern boundary of the County borders the Nebraska state line. Goshen County produces more beef cattle than any other Wyoming county. In 1997, the county had a total of 688 farms and ranches, averaging 1,840 acres. As of 2007, this had declined slightly to 665 farms and ranches in the county.

== History ==
Goshen County was created in 1911 from a portion of Laramie County. Its government was organized in 1913. This area was part of territories, at one time or another, claimed by: Spain, France, Great Britain, Mexico, and the Republic of Texas. The Louisiana Purchase in 1803 permanently established the claim of the United States to the area.

By the 1820s, the North Platte River had become a route for westward-bound fur traders and trappers. By the 1840s this route became part of the Oregon Trail or Mormon Trail. By the late 1850s, it was the route for regularly scheduled east–west stagecoaches carrying passengers and the U.S. mail, and for the short-lived Pony Express carrying mail from Missouri to California (April 1860 to November 1861). By October 1861, transcontinental telegraph lines had been completed along the route. From September 1876 to February 1887, a north–south, Cheyenne-Deadwood stage coach line ran through the county from Cheyenne to the gold fields of the Dakota Territory.

The county was apparently named for Goshen Hole, a valley in the southwest part of the county. John C. Frémont camped in that area on July 14, 1843, and recorded that name in his journal, during an expedition on the Oregon Trail. At least four conflicting stories are available for the origin of the name "Goshen Hole". The Land of Goshen in Egypt, mentioned in the 45th chapter of the Genesis in the Bible, has been suggested as the most likely. John Hunton, who was ranching in the area by the 1870s, was told by Seth Ward, the post sutler at Fort Laramie, that the area was named for the Biblical land. The name of Goshen Hole first appeared on a map years later, in 1888.

== Geography ==
According to the US Census Bureau, the county has a total area of 2,232 square miles (5,780 km^{2}), of which 2,225 square miles (5,760 km^{2}) is land and 6.8 square miles (18 km^{2}) (0.3%) is water. The county is situated in the High Plains east of the Rocky Mountains.

=== Adjacent counties ===
- Niobrara County - north
- Platte County - west
- Laramie County - south
- Banner County, Nebraska - southeast
- Scotts Bluff County, Nebraska - east
- Sioux County, Nebraska - east

=== National protected area ===
- Fort Laramie National Historic Site

== Climate ==
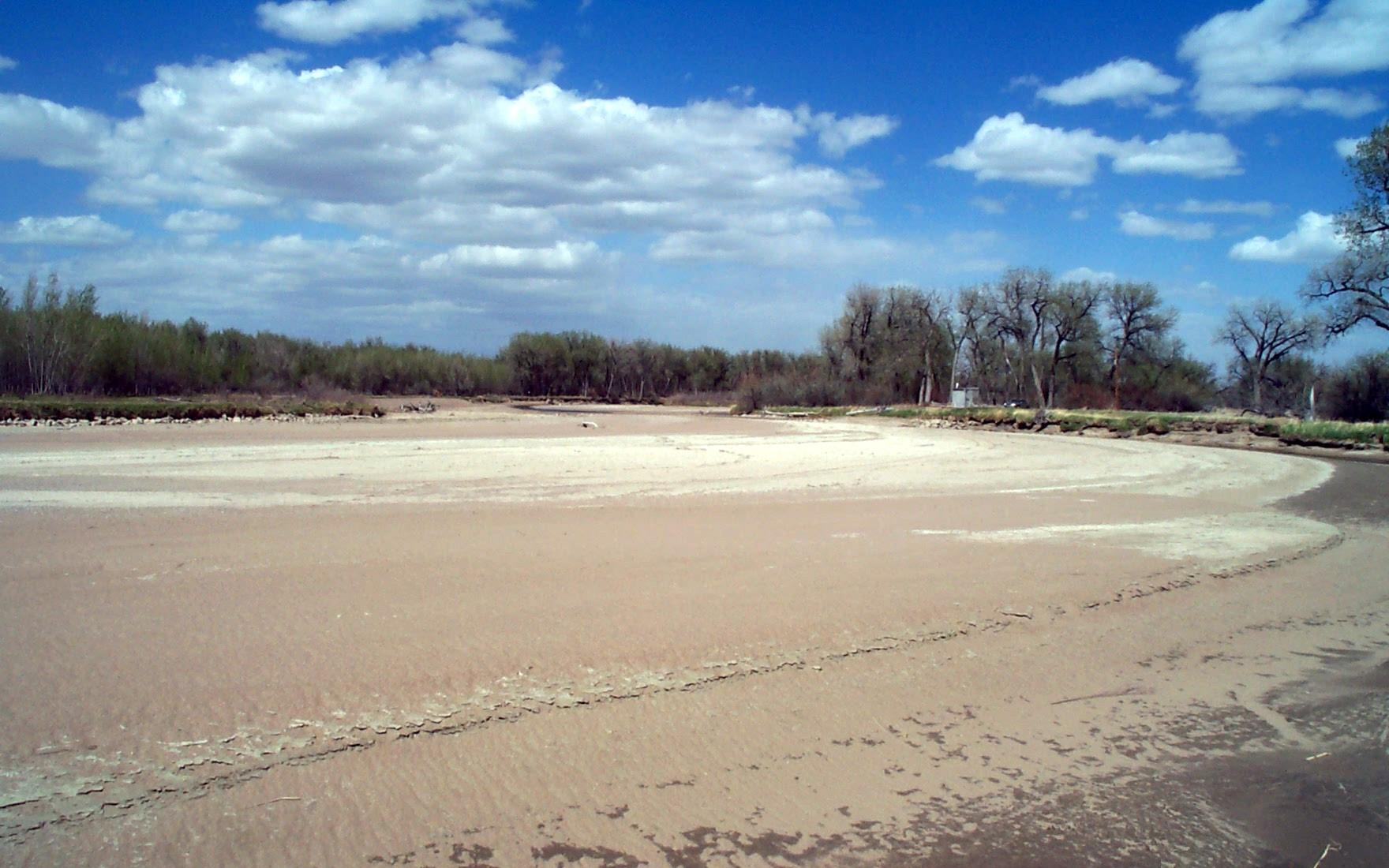
Dry stream on North Platte River in Goshen County during May 2002 drought conditions.

Situated on the North Platte River, Goshen County has a semi-arid climate (Köppen climate classification BSk.)

Climate data for Torrington, Wyoming
Month	Jan	Feb	Mar	Apr	May	Jun	Jul	Aug	Sep	Oct	Nov	Dec	Year
Record high °F (°C)	70 (21)	75 (24)	85 (29)	91 (33)	100 (38)	105 (41)	111 (44)	105 (41)	101 (38)	92 (33)	83 (28)	77 (25)	111 (44)
Mean daily maximum °F (°C)	39.5 (4.2)	45.0 (7.2)	52.0 (11.1)	61.2 (16.2)	71.0 (21.7)	82.4 (28.0)	89.1 (31.7)	87.3 (30.7)	77.7 (25.4)	65.4 (18.6)	49.2 (9.6)	41.0 (5.0)	63.4 (17.5)
Daily mean °F (°C)	24.9 (−3.9)	30.0 (−1.1)	37.5 (3.1)	46.0 (7.8)	56.2 (13.4)	66.3 (19.1)	72.3 (22.4)	70.2 (21.2)	59.8 (15.4)	47.6 (8.7)	34.0 (1.1)	26.2 (−3.2)	47.6 (8.7)
Mean daily minimum °F (°C)	10.3 (−12.1)	14.9 (−9.5)	23.0 (−5.0)	30.7 (−0.7)	41.3 (5.2)	50.2 (10.1)	55.5 (13.1)	53.1 (11.7)	41.9 (5.5)	29.7 (−1.3)	18.8 (−7.3)	11.3 (−11.5)	31.7 (−0.2)
Record low °F (°C)	−39 (−39)	−33 (−36)	−26 (−32)	−17 (−27)	11 (−12)	29 (−2)	39 (4)	32 (0)	14 (−10)	−9 (−23)	−23 (−31)	−43 (−42)	−43 (−42)
Average precipitation inches (mm)	0.31 (7.9)	0.40 (10)	0.70 (18)	1.68 (43)	2.54 (65)	2.09 (53)	1.78 (45)	1.19 (30)	1.27 (32)	0.95 (24)	0.57 (14)	0.36 (9.1)	13.84 (351)
Average snowfall inches (cm)	4.8 (12)	4.9 (12)	4.9 (12)	3.2 (8.1)	0.1 (0.25)	0.0 (0.0)	0.0 (0.0)	0.0 (0.0)	0.4 (1.0)	2.1 (5.3)	4.8 (12)	6.8 (17)	32 (79.65)
Average precipitation days (≥ 0.01 inch)	4.3	3.5	5.3	7.5	9.8	8.7	7.6	6.3	5.9	4.7	4.0	3.9	71.5
Average snowy days (≥ 0.1 inch)	3.8	2.8	2.5	1.3	0.2	0.0	0.0	0.0	0.2	0.8	2.4	3.6	17.6
Source 1: NOAA (normals, 1971–2000)
Source 2: The Weather Channel (Records) NOAA NNDC Climate Data

On June 5, 2009, a weather research team known as VORTEX2 observed and measured the full life cycle of a tornado in eastern Goshen County.

== Demographics ==
Historical population
Census	Pop.	Note	%±
1920	8,064		—
1930	11,754		45.8%
1940	12,207		3.9%
1950	12,634		3.5%
1960	11,941		−5.5%
1970	10,885		−8.8%
1980	12,040		10.6%
1990	12,373		2.8%
2000	12,538		1.3%
2010	13,249		5.7%
2020	12,498		−5.7%
2025 (est.)	12,640	▲	1.1%
US Decennial Census; 1870–2000 2010 2020

=== 2020 census ===
As of the 2020 census, the county had a population of 12,498. Of the residents, 19.9% were under the age of 18 and 24.1% were 65 years of age or older; the median age was 44.9 years. For every 100 females there were 109.4 males, and for every 100 females age 18 and over there were 110.1 males.

Goshen County, Wyoming – Racial and ethnic composition Note: the US Census treats Hispanic/Latino as an ethnic category. This table excludes Latinos from the racial categories and assigns them to a separate category. Hispanics/Latinos may be of any race.
Race / Ethnicity (NH = Non-Hispanic)	Pop 2000	Pop 2010	Pop 2020	% 2000	% 2010	% 2020
White alone (NH)	11,172	11,651	10,695	89.11%	87.94%	85.57%
Black or African American alone (NH)	25	70	76	0.20%	0.53%	0.61%
Native American or Alaska Native alone (NH)	93	91	83	0.74%	0.69%	0.66%
Asian alone (NH)	25	32	46	0.20%	0.24%	0.37%
Pacific Islander alone (NH)	15	10	0	0.12%	0.08%	0.00%
Other race alone (NH)	6	3	42	0.05%	0.02%	0.34%
Mixed race or Multiracial (NH)	95	104	344	0.76%	0.78%	2.75%
Hispanic or Latino (any race)	1,107	1,288	1,212	8.83%	9.72%	9.70%
Total	12,538	13,249	12,498	100.00%	100.00%	100.00%

The racial makeup of the county was 88.9% White, 0.6% Black or African American, 0.9% American Indian and Alaska Native, 0.4% Asian, 3.6% from some other race, and 5.6% from two or more races. Hispanic or Latino residents of any race comprised 9.7% of the population.

There were 5,057 households in the county, of which 24.6% had children under the age of 18 living with them and 23.1% had a female householder with no spouse or partner present. About 32.5% of all households were made up of individuals and 15.8% had someone living alone who was 65 years of age or older.

There were 5,853 housing units, of which 13.6% were vacant. Among occupied housing units, 72.8% were owner-occupied and 27.2% were renter-occupied. The homeowner vacancy rate was 2.3% and the rental vacancy rate was 12.1%.

=== 2010 census ===
As of the 2010 United States census, there were 13,249 people, 5,311 households, and 3,466 families in the county. The population density was 6.0 people per square mile (2.3 people/km^{2}). There were 5,972 housing units at an average density of 2.7 units per square mile (1.0 units/km^{2}). The racial makeup of the county was 94.5% white, 0.8% American Indian, 0.6% black or African American, 0.3% Asian, 0.1% Pacific islander, 2.4% from other races, and 1.2% from two or more races. Those of Hispanic or Latino origin made up 9.7% of the population. In terms of ancestry, 38.3% were German, 15.5% were Irish, 15.3% were English, and 5.1% were American.

Of the 5,311 households, 26.4% had children under the age of 18 living with them, 53.1% were married couples living together, 7.9% had a female householder with no husband present, 34.7% were non-families, and 30.0% of all households were made up of individuals. The average household size was 2.29 and the average family size was 2.82. The median age was 43.6 years.

The median income for a household in the county was $42,590 and the median income for a family was $51,978. Males had a median income of $38,247 versus $25,277 for females. The per capita income for the county was $23,753. About 7.2% of families and 13.1% of the population were below the poverty line, including 21.3% of those under age 18 and 5.9% of those age 65 or over.

=== 2000 census ===
As of the 2000 United States census, of 2000, there were 12,538 people, 5,061 households, and 3,426 families in the county. The population density was 6 people per square mile (2.3 people/km^{2}). There were 5,881 housing units at an average density of 3 units per square mile (1.2 units/km^{2}). The racial makeup of the county was 93.83% White, 0.20% Black or African American, 0.86% Native American, 0.20% Asian, 0.12% Pacific Islander, 3.65% from other races, and 1.14% from two or more races. 8.83% of the population were Hispanic or Latino of any race. 38.2% were of German, 10.4% English, 8.0% American and 8.0% Irish ancestry.

There were 5,061 households, out of which 28.60% had children under the age of 18 living with them, 56.70% were married couples living together, 7.70% had a female householder with no husband present, and 32.30% were non-families. 27.60% of all households were made up of individuals, and 13.10% had someone living alone who was 65 years of age or older. The average household size was 2.38 and the average family size was 2.90.

The county population contained 24.20% under the age of 18, 9.40% from 18 to 24, 24.30% from 25 to 44, 24.80% from 45 to 64, and 17.30% who were 65 years of age or older. The median age was 40 years. For every 100 females there were 98.90 males. For every 100 females age 18 and over, there were 95.00 males.

The median income for a household in the county was $32,228, and the median income for a family was $40,297. Males had a median income of $27,713 versus $17,584 for females. The per capita income for the county was $15,965. About 9.70% of families and 13.90% of the population were below the poverty line, including 16.30% of those under age 18 and 12.50% of those age 65 or over.

== Communities ==
=== City ===
- Torrington (county seat)

=== Towns ===
- Fort Laramie
- LaGrange
- Lingle
- Yoder

=== Census-designated places ===
- Hawk Springs
- Huntley
- Veteran

=== Unincorporated communities ===
- Jay Em
- Rockeagle

== Government and infrastructure ==
The Goshen County Fairgrounds are west of Torrington on U.S. Hwy 26/85. The fairground facilities host many events throughout the year, including an annual Goshen County Fair and numerous rodeo events.

The Wyoming Department of Corrections Wyoming Medium Correctional Institution (WMCI) is located east of Torrington on County Road 72 (Sheep Creek Rd.) The WMCI, a facility of the Wyoming Department of Corrections, serves as an intake center for men not serving death sentences. The grand opening occurred on January 6, 2010.

Goshen County voters have been reliably Republican for several decades. Since 1936, in only one national election did they select the Democratic Party candidate (as of 2024).

United States presidential election results for Goshen County, Wyoming
Year	Republican		Democratic		Third party(ies)	
Year	No.	%	No.	%	No.	%
1912	292	32.52%	318	35.41%	288	32.07%
1916	770	39.77%	1,096	56.61%	70	3.62%
1920	1,496	72.73%	552	26.84%	9	0.44%
1924	1,603	56.15%	464	16.25%	788	27.60%
1928	2,483	75.29%	777	23.56%	38	1.15%
1932	1,954	42.57%	2,545	55.45%	91	1.98%
1936	2,047	43.09%	2,639	55.55%	65	1.37%
1940	2,861	58.89%	1,982	40.80%	15	0.31%
1944	2,674	63.85%	1,514	36.15%	0	0.00%
1948	2,029	51.91%	1,843	47.15%	37	0.95%
1952	3,396	67.14%	1,648	32.58%	14	0.28%
1956	2,825	57.01%	2,130	42.99%	0	0.00%
1960	3,178	56.83%	2,414	43.17%	0	0.00%
1964	2,604	48.65%	2,749	51.35%	0	0.00%
1968	2,719	57.65%	1,529	32.42%	468	9.92%
1972	3,629	70.27%	1,515	29.34%	20	0.39%
1976	2,764	54.86%	2,262	44.90%	12	0.24%
1980	3,572	67.21%	1,373	25.83%	370	6.96%
1984	3,776	72.84%	1,364	26.31%	44	0.85%
1988	3,075	61.44%	1,875	37.46%	55	1.10%
1992	2,395	45.04%	1,754	32.98%	1,169	21.98%
1996	2,989	54.22%	1,923	34.88%	601	10.90%
2000	3,922	71.05%	1,439	26.07%	159	2.88%
2004	4,114	71.19%	1,566	27.10%	99	1.71%
2008	3,942	66.68%	1,832	30.99%	138	2.33%
2012	4,178	71.96%	1,458	25.11%	170	2.93%
2016	4,418	76.22%	924	15.94%	454	7.83%
2020	4,878	78.16%	1,203	19.28%	160	2.56%
2024	4,893	79.25%	1,156	18.72%	125	2.02%

== Transportation ==
=== Highways ===
==== U.S. Highways ====
- US 26
- US 85

==== State Routes ====
- WYO 92 (Huntley Road)
- WYO 151 (LaGrange Road)
- WYO 152 (Yoder Road)
- WYO 153 (Springer Reservoir Road)
- WYO 154 (Veteran Road)
- WYO 156 (Sugar Factory Road)
- WYO 158 (Horse Creek Road)
- WYO 159 (Van Tassell Road)
- WYO 160 (Old Fort Laramie Road)
- WYO 161 (Yoder-Huntley Road)
- WYO 313 (Chugwater Road)

=== Airport ===
- Torrington Municipal Airport (TOR) – Torrington

== See also ==
- National Register of Historic Places listings in Goshen County, Wyoming
- Wyoming
  - List of cities and towns in Wyoming
  - List of counties in Wyoming
  - Wyoming statistical areas
