= Veteran, Wyoming =

Place in Wyoming, United States

- CDP
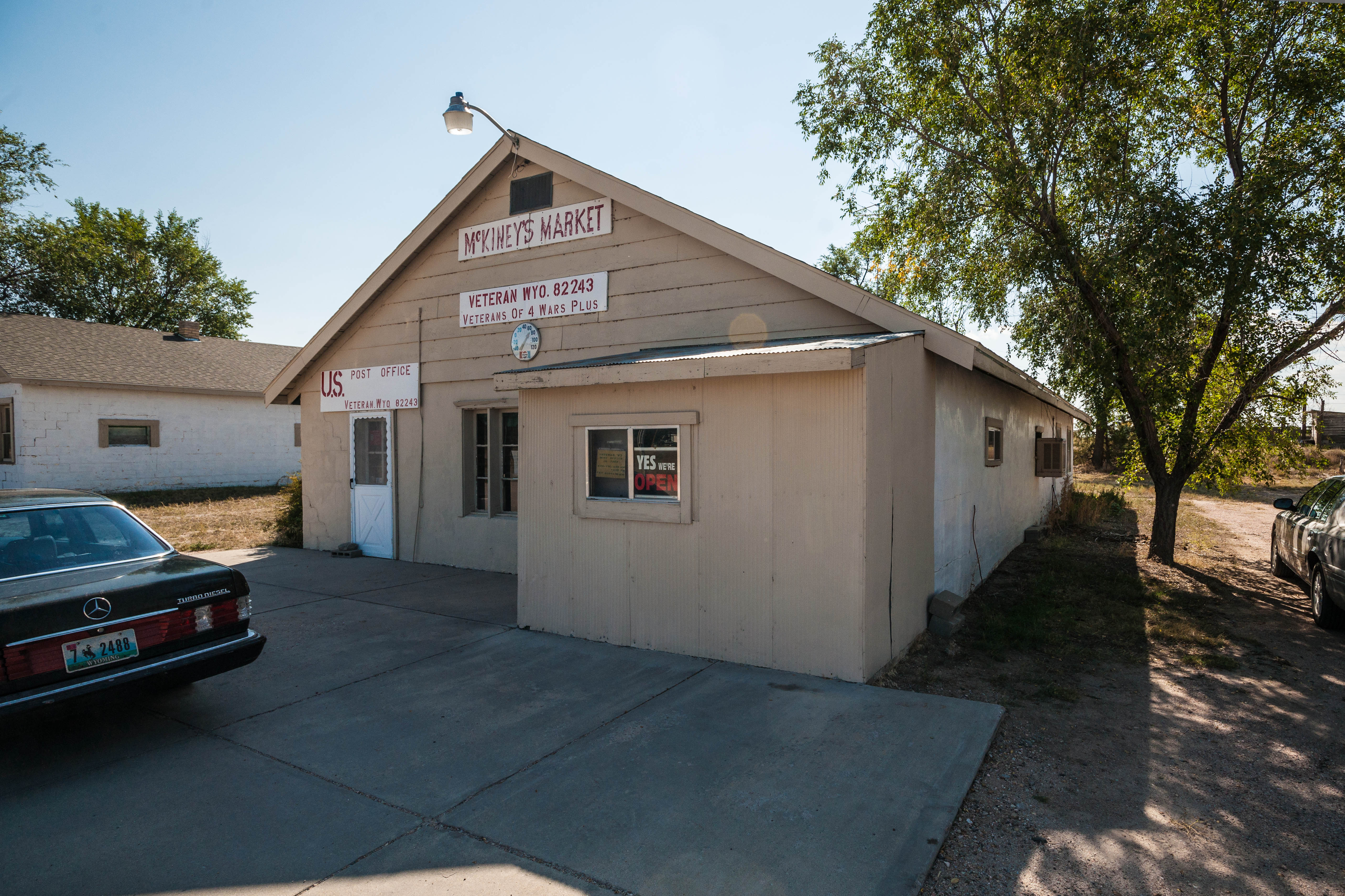
- Mckinley's Market & Post Office; Veteran, Wyoming, September 2012

- Location in Goshen County and the state of Wyoming
- Coordinates: 41°57′47″N 104°22′48″W
- Country: United States
- State: Wyoming
- County: Goshen

Area
  - Total: 1.4 sq mi (3.5 km^{2})
  - Land: 1.4 sq mi (3.5 km^{2})
  - Water: 0 sq mi (0.0 km^{2})
- Elevation: 4,239 ft (1,292 m)

Population (2010)
  - Total: 23
  - Density: 17/sq mi (6.6/km^{2})
- Time zone: UTC-7 (Mountain (MST))
  - Summer (DST): UTC-6 (MDT)
- ZIP code: 82243
- Area code: 307
- FIPS code: 56-80285
- GNIS feature ID: 2409510

Veteran is a census-designated place (CDP) located in Goshen County, Wyoming, United States. The population was 23 at the 2010 census.

== History ==
Veteran was originally built up chiefly by World War I veterans, hence the name.

== Geography ==
According to the United States Census Bureau, the CDP has a total area of 1.3 square miles (3.5 km^{2}), all land.

== Demographics ==
As of the census of 2000, there were 28 people, 11 households, and 8 families residing in the CDP. The population density was 20.9 people per square mile (8.1/km^{2}). There were 16 housing units at an average density of 12.0/sq mi (4.6/km^{2}). The racial makeup of the CDP was 100.00% White. 0.00% of the population was Hispanic or Latino of any race.

There were 11 households, out of which 27.3% had children under the age of 18 living with them, 81.8% were married couples living together, and 18.2% were non-families. 18.2% of all households were made up of individuals, and none had someone living alone who was 65 years of age or older. The average household size was 2.55 and the average family size was 2.89.

In the CDP, the population was spread out, with 17.9% under the age of 18, 3.6% from 18 to 24, 17.9% from 25 to 44, 39.3% from 45 to 64, and 21.4% who were 65 years of age or older. The median age was 52 years. For every 100 females, there were 100.0 males. For every 100 females age 18 and over, there were 109.1 males.

== Education ==
Public education in the community of Veteran is provided by Goshen County School District #1.

== Highways ==
- U.S. Highway 85
- WYO 154

== See also ==
- List of census-designated places in Wyoming

== See also ==
Media related to Veteran, Wyoming at Wikimedia Commons
