= Hawk Springs, Wyoming =

- CDP
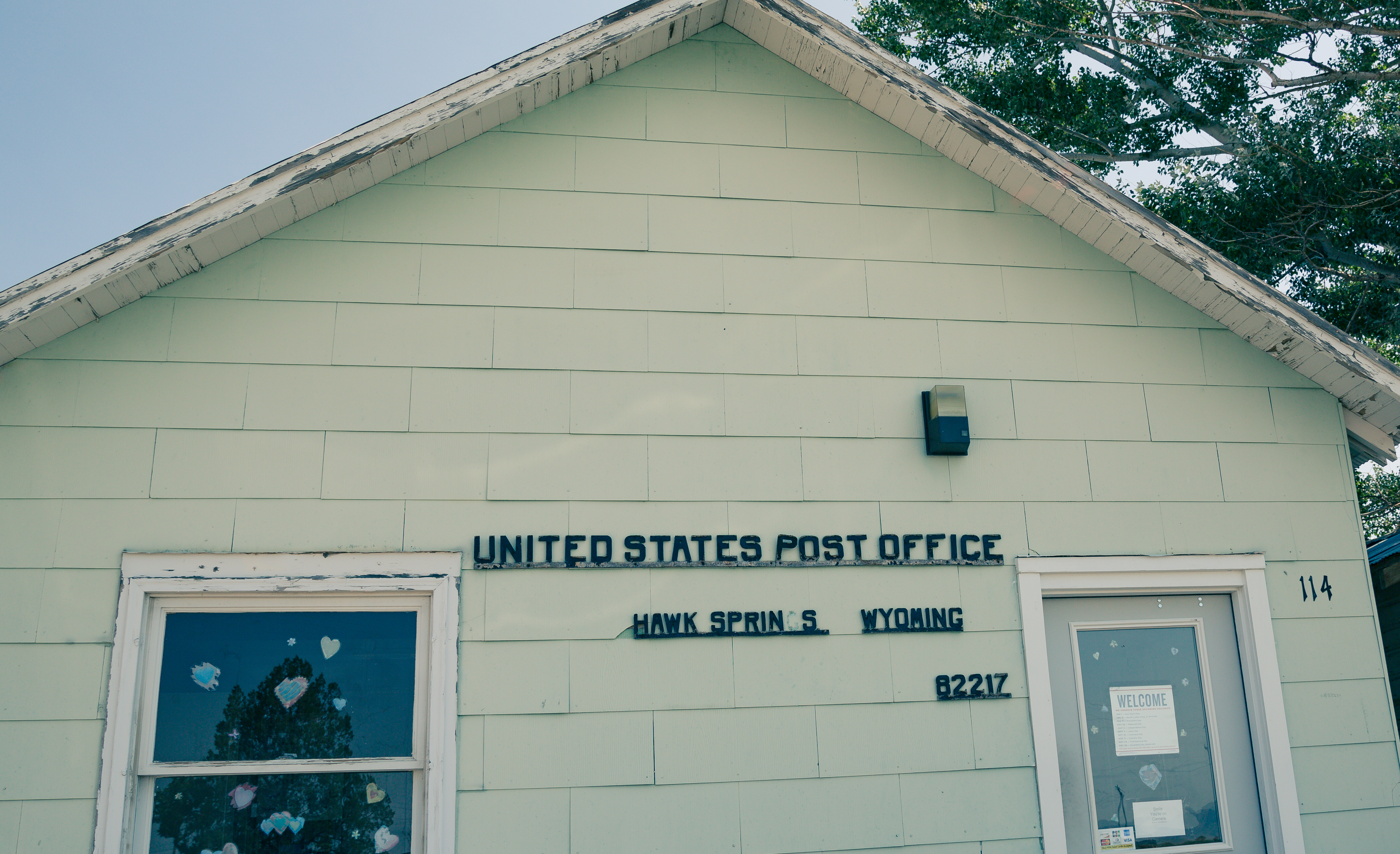
- Hawk Springs Post Office, July 2016

- Location in Goshen County and the state of Wyoming
- Coordinates: 41°47′07″N 104°15′54″W
- Country: United States
- State: Wyoming
- County: Goshen

Area
  - Total: 1.7 sq mi (4.4 km^{2})
  - Land: 1.7 sq mi (4.4 km^{2})
  - Water: 0 sq mi (0.0 km^{2})
- Elevation: 4,383 ft (1,336 m)

Population (2010)
  - Total: 45
  - Density: 26/sq mi (10/km^{2})
- Time zone: UTC-7 (Mountain (MST))
  - Summer (DST): UTC-6 (MDT)
- ZIP code: 82217
- Area code: 307
- FIPS code: 56-36060
- GNIS feature ID: 2408358

Hawk Springs is a census-designated place (CDP) in Goshen County, Wyoming, United States. The population was 45 at the 2010 census.

Hawk Springs State Recreation Area is located 6 miles (9.7 km) southeast of Hawk Springs.

== Geography ==
According to the United States Census Bureau, the CDP has a total area of 1.7 square miles (4.4 km^{2}), all land.

On June 23rd 2023, Hawk Springs experienced an intense EF2 Tornado that injured a semi truck driver when his vehicle was overturned east of US-85.

== Demographics ==
As of the census of 2000, there were 69 people, 27 households, and 15 families residing in the CDP. The population density was 40.5 people per square mile (15.7/km^{2}). There were 40 housing units at an average density of 23.5/sq mi (9.1/km^{2}). The racial makeup of the CDP was 82.61% White, 17.39% from other races. Hispanic or Latino of any race were 17.39% of the population.

There were 27 households, out of which 33.3% had children under the age of 18 living with them, 51.9% were married couples living together, and 44.4% were non-families. 37.0% of all households were made up of individuals, and 11.1% had someone living alone who was 65 years of age or older. The average household size was 2.56 and the average family size was 3.67.

In the CDP, the population was spread out, with 29.0% under the age of 18, 10.1% from 18 to 24, 26.1% from 25 to 44, 20.3% from 45 to 64, and 14.5% who were 65 years of age or older. The median age was 34 years. For every 100 females, there were 102.9 males. For every 100 females age 18 and over, there were 96.0 males.

The median income for a household in the CDP was $8,750, and the median income for a family was $0. Males had a median income of $0 versus $0 for females. The per capita income for the CDP was $9,600. None of the population or families were below the poverty line.

== Education ==
Public education for the community of Hawk Springs is provided by Goshen County School District #1.

== Highways ==
- U.S. Highway 85
- WYO 313 (Chugwater Road)

== See also ==
- List of census-designated places in Wyoming
