= Torrington, Wyoming =

City in and county seat of Goshen County, Wyoming, United States

- City
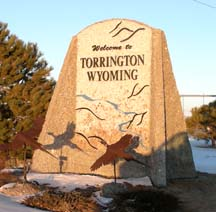
- Sign welcoming visitors to Torrington (2006)

- Location of Torrington in Goshen County, Wyoming
- Coordinates: 42°04′05″N 104°08′57″W
- Country: United States
- State: Wyoming
- County: Goshen
- Named for: Torrington, Connecticut

Area
  - Total: 3.73 sq mi (9.65 km^{2})
  - Land: 3.72 sq mi (9.64 km^{2})
  - Water: 0.0039 sq mi (0.01 km^{2})
- Elevation: 4,104 ft (1,251 m)

Population (2020)
  - Total: 6,119
  - Density: 1,644.0/sq mi (634.75/km^{2})
- Time zone: UTC-7 (Mountain (MST))
  - Summer (DST): UTC-6 (MDT)
- ZIP code: 82240
- Area code: 307
- FIPS code: 56-77530
- GNIS ID: 2412088
- Website: City website

Torrington is a city in and the county seat of Goshen County, Wyoming, United States. The population was 6,119 at the 2020 census, down from 6,501 at the 2010 census.

It is the home of Eastern Wyoming College, and is the surrounding region's center of commercial activity. Within this primarily agricultural community, there are several fertilizer plants, a former sugar beet factory which closed in 2019, and numerous tourist facilities and retail businesses that serve the local and nearby rural populations.

== History ==
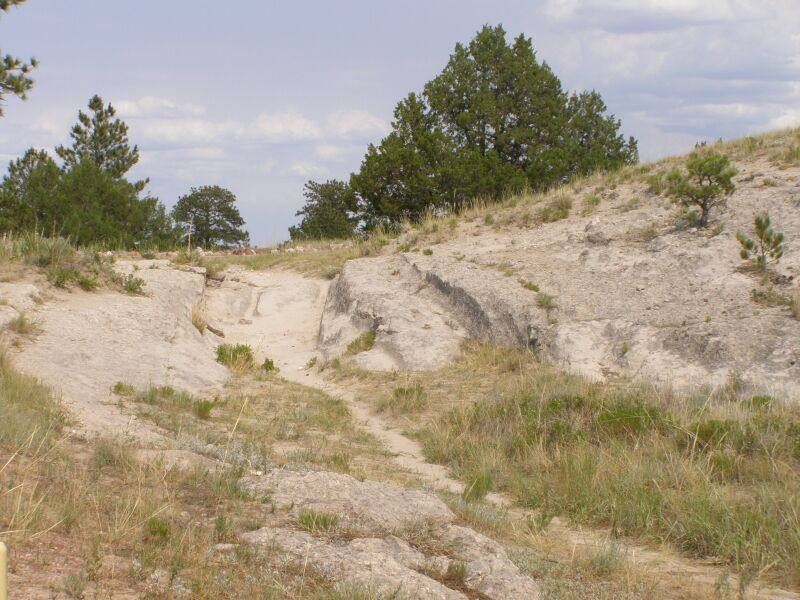
Ruts made by early pioneer's wagons on the historic Oregon Trail in the late 19th Century in Eastern Wyoming (2007 photo)

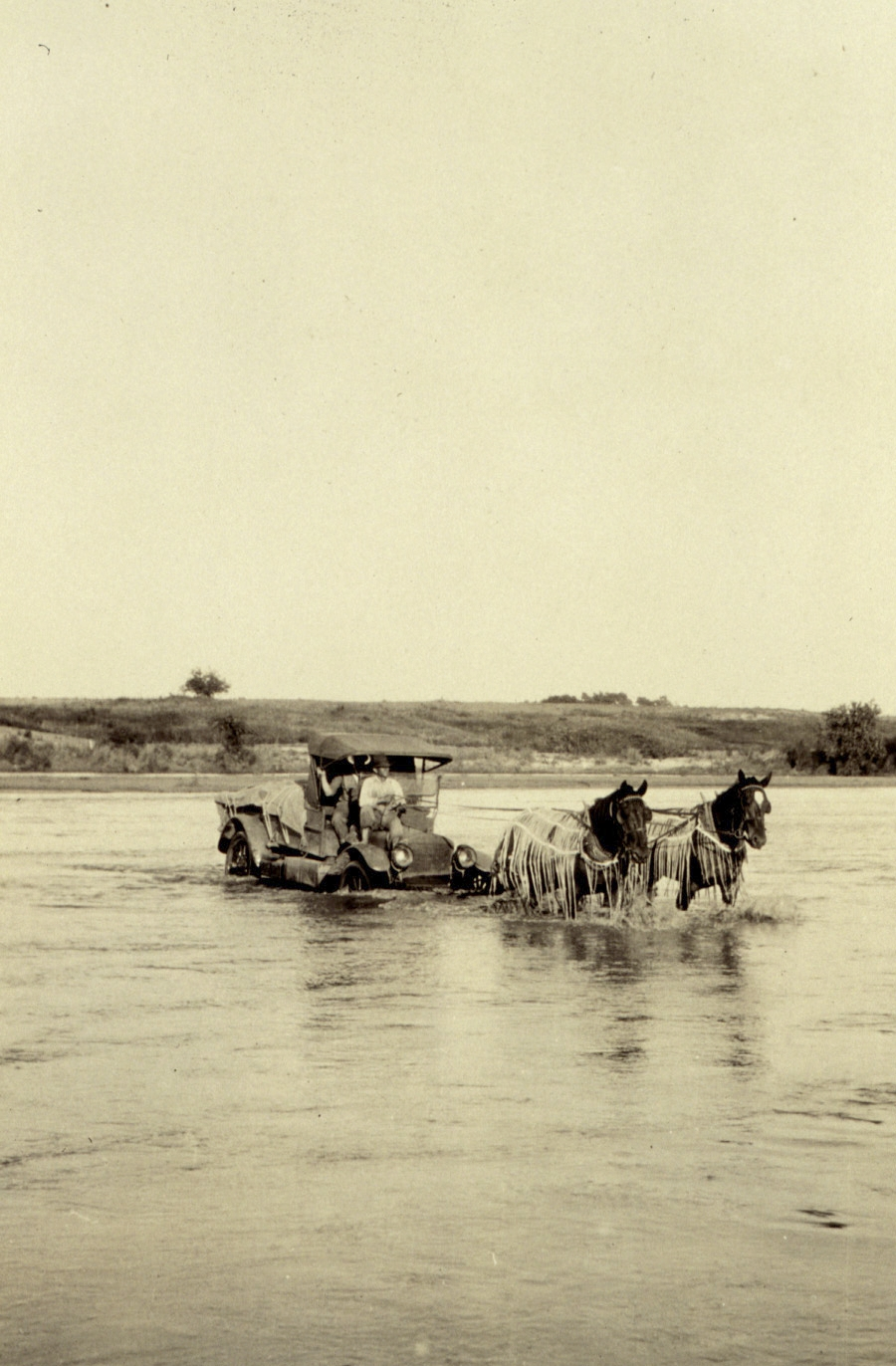
Vintage photo of early 20th Century resident of the West using horses to pull his "horseless carriage" while "fording" a river

Situated on the historic Mormon Trail and near the Oregon and California trails along the banks of the North Platte River, Torrington was founded in 1900 by W. G. Curtis (1857–1913), and named by him for his home town of Torrington, Connecticut. Originally a watering and coaling station for the CB&Q Railroad, which began passenger service in 1900, the town was a gathering place for nearby farmers and ranchers. In 1905, the first bridge was constructed over the North Platte River.

A post office called Torrington was established in 1889 on Curtis' farm three miles west of the future town, with Curtis serving as postmaster and later as mayor. In 1908, the town incorporated in Laramie County. It had a bank, three general stores, a pharmacy with a soda fountain, a land office, and two hotels (for one of which the building, although modified, still exists at 1841 Main Street.) It soon became a central place of trade for Goshen County, and for surrounding areas in eastern Wyoming and western Nebraska.

The town's site survey began in April 1900, by Ashland B. Smith of the Lincoln Land Company of Nebraska. The survey and plating was recorded in Cheyenne on June 22, 1900, and individual plots of the land sold to residents for one dollar each by Charles Henry Morrill, President of the Lincoln Land Company. The Torrington Telegram (which was still published in 2015) was established in 1911. The 1900 United States Census lists only 71 inhabitants in the Torrington Precinct and does not list it as a town. All residents were stock growers, ranch laborers, cowboys or at school, except for one listed as a hardware clerk.

Also in 1911, Goshen County was organized. The County was created from a portion of the northern end of Laramie County. The towns of Torrington and nearby Lingle—some 10 miles (16 km) away—competed for designation as the county seat. Torrington prevailed after Torrington residents raised sufficient funds for a courthouse. The cornerstone for the courthouse was set in 1913, in a ceremony where a band was conducted by Hi Yoder, from whose family the nearby town of Yoder, Wyoming, takes its name.

Around that time, early motor cars started showing up in town, the Goshen County Fair Association was established, and in 1915 Torrington had a population of 443. In 1919, the Trail Hotel building, which still exists at 2001 Main Street, was constructed. In 1925, the Union Pacific Railroad based in Omaha constructed a spur line from Cheyenne to South Torrington, to serve the proposed Holly Sugar Corporation plant, which began operations in 1926.

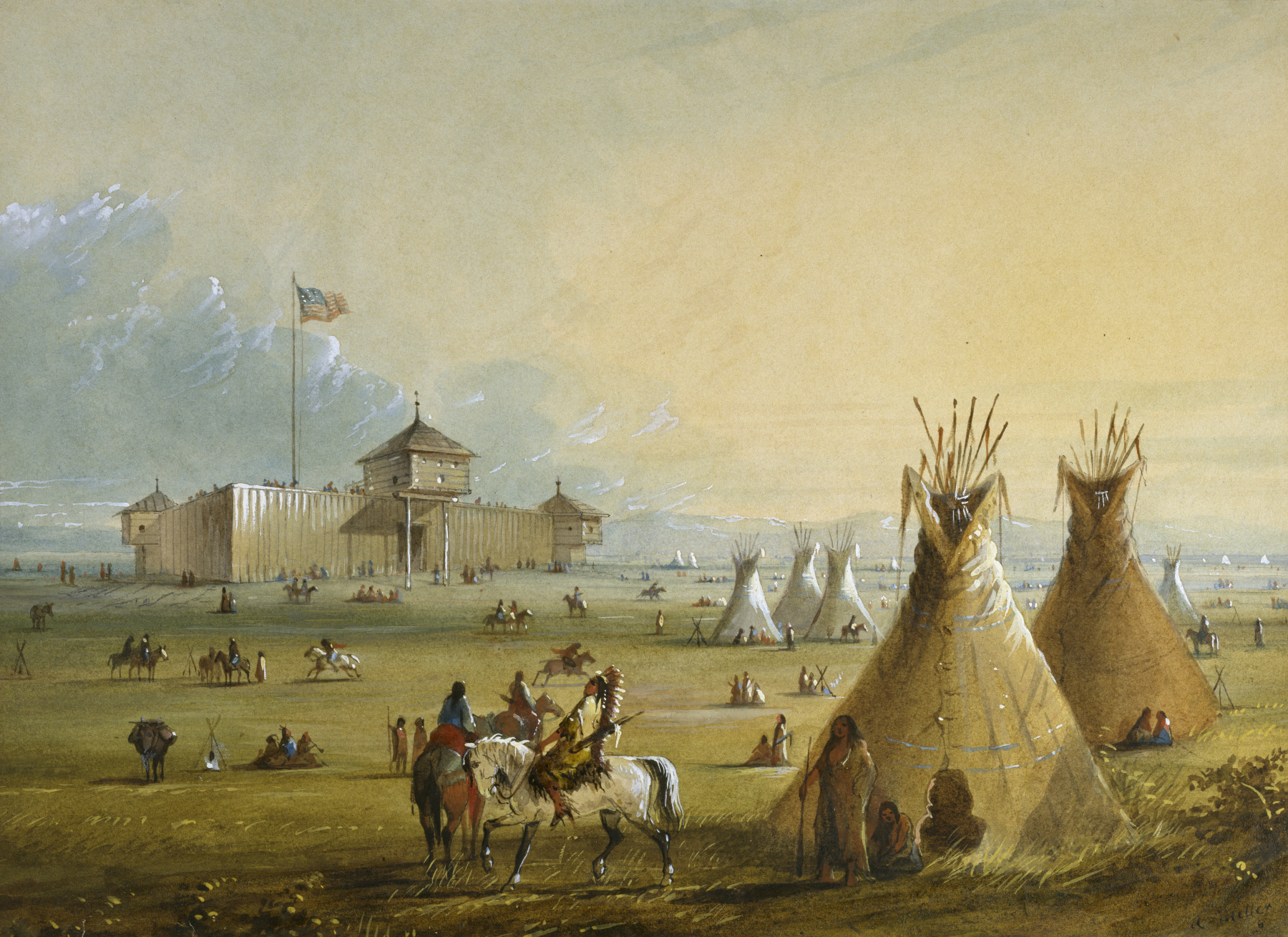
Fort Laramie as it looked prior to 1840. Painting by Alfred Jacob Miller

The Holly Sugar factory, later Western Sugar Cooperative, processed sugar beets since 1923 and closed in early 2019. It was once a major employer for the Torrington area. The preserved historic Union Pacific Depot building now houses the Goshen County Homesteaders Museum.

The Torrington Livestock Commission, established in 1934, still held twice-weekly livestock auctions in 2015. It is the largest livestock auction operation and barn in Wyoming, and ranks as the third to fifth largest livestock auction in the United States. Drawing cattle from a nine-state region (Nebraska, Colorado, Arizona, Nevada, Utah, Idaho, South Dakota, Montana and the bulk of Wyoming) the Torrington livestock auction barn attracts buyers from all over the nation. And, as of 2011, Goshen County ranked number one in Wyoming for its cattle inventory.

Today, when traveling between Torrington and Guernsey, Wyoming, motorists will be following the path of the historic Oregon and Mormon Trail as they make their way along the banks of the North Platte River past the site of the 1854 Grattan Massacre near Lingle, and past the historic western 19th-Century U.S. Army Cavalry outpost, Fort Laramie National Historic Site.

== Geography ==
According to the United States Census Bureau, the city has a total area of 4.62 square miles (11.97 km^{2}), all land.

=== Climate ===
Torrington, situated on the North Platte River, has a semi-arid climate (Köppen climate classification BSk).

Climate data for Torrington, Wyoming
Month	Jan	Feb	Mar	Apr	May	Jun	Jul	Aug	Sep	Oct	Nov	Dec	Year
Record high °F (°C)	70 (21)	75 (24)	90 (32)	91 (33)	100 (38)	105 (41)	111 (44)	105 (41)	101 (38)	92 (33)	83 (28)	77 (25)	111 (44)
Mean daily maximum °F (°C)	39.5 (4.2)	45.0 (7.2)	52.0 (11.1)	61.2 (16.2)	71.0 (21.7)	82.4 (28.0)	89.1 (31.7)	87.3 (30.7)	77.7 (25.4)	65.4 (18.6)	49.2 (9.6)	41.0 (5.0)	63.4 (17.5)
Daily mean °F (°C)	24.9 (−3.9)	30.0 (−1.1)	37.5 (3.1)	46.0 (7.8)	56.2 (13.4)	66.3 (19.1)	72.3 (22.4)	70.2 (21.2)	59.8 (15.4)	47.6 (8.7)	34.0 (1.1)	26.2 (−3.2)	47.6 (8.7)
Mean daily minimum °F (°C)	10.3 (−12.1)	14.9 (−9.5)	23.0 (−5.0)	30.7 (−0.7)	41.3 (5.2)	50.2 (10.1)	55.5 (13.1)	53.1 (11.7)	41.9 (5.5)	29.7 (−1.3)	18.8 (−7.3)	11.3 (−11.5)	31.7 (−0.2)
Record low °F (°C)	−39 (−39)	−33 (−36)	−26 (−32)	−17 (−27)	11 (−12)	29 (−2)	39 (4)	32 (0)	14 (−10)	−9 (−23)	−23 (−31)	−43 (−42)	−43 (−42)
Average precipitation inches (mm)	0.31 (7.9)	0.40 (10)	0.70 (18)	1.68 (43)	2.54 (65)	2.09 (53)	1.78 (45)	1.19 (30)	1.27 (32)	0.95 (24)	0.57 (14)	0.36 (9.1)	13.84 (351)
Source 1: NOAA (normals, 1971–2000)
Source 2: The Weather Channel (Records) NOAA NNDC Climate Data

== Demographics ==
Historical population
Census	Pop.	Note	%±
1910	155		—
1920	1,301		739.4%
1930	1,811		39.2%
1940	2,344		29.4%
1950	3,247		38.5%
1960	4,188		29.0%
1970	4,237		1.2%
1980	5,441		28.4%
1990	5,651		3.9%
2000	5,776		2.2%
2010	6,501		12.6%
2020	6,119		−5.9%
2023 (est.)	6,212		1.5%
U.S. Decennial Census

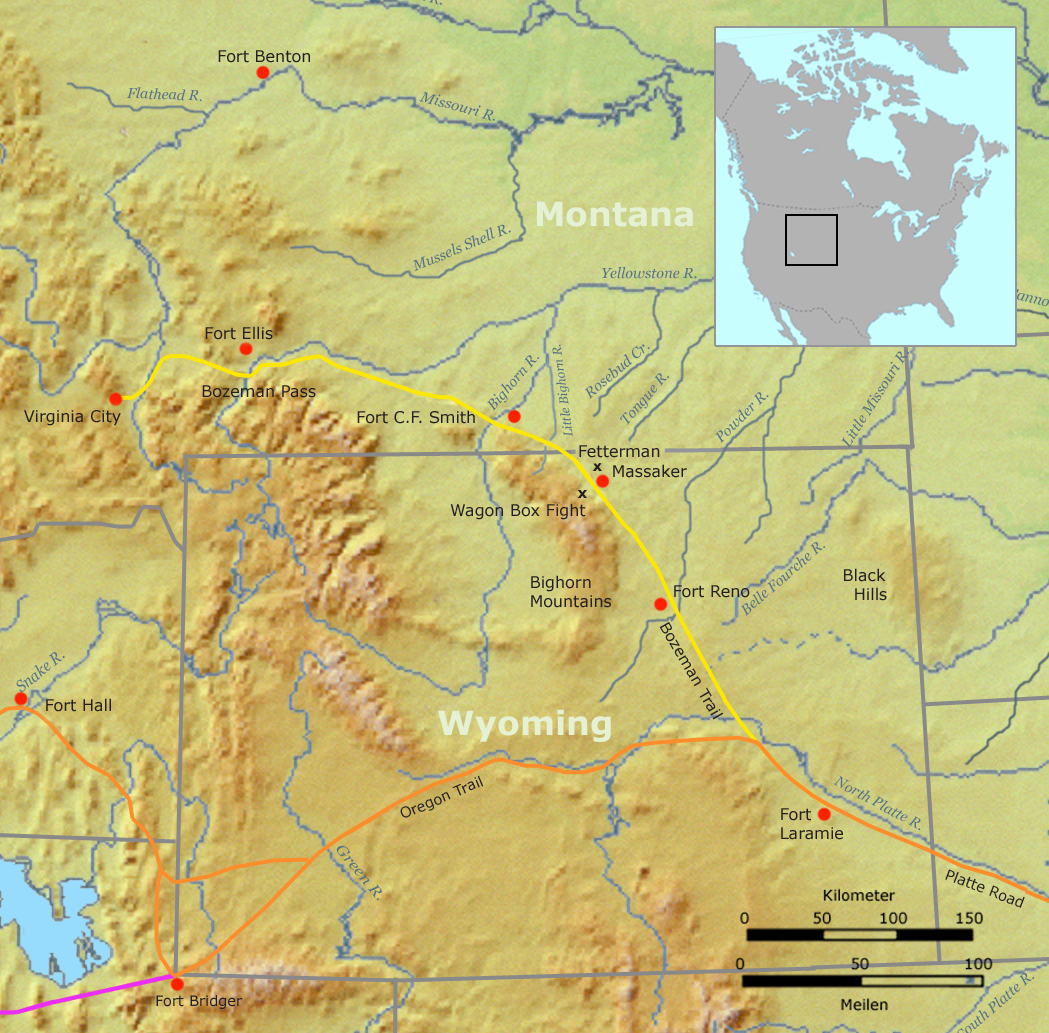
The historic California, Mormon, Oregon & Bozeman Trails headed to Fort Laramie and further on into the American West, all passed through Torrington along the banks of the North Platte River

=== 2020 census ===
As of the 2020 census, Torrington had a population of 6,119. The median age was 42.0 years. 19.7% of residents were under the age of 18 and 23.2% of residents were 65 years of age or older. For every 100 females there were 114.1 males, and for every 100 females age 18 and over there were 115.0 males age 18 and over.

89.4% of residents lived in urban areas, while 10.6% lived in rural areas.

There were 2,379 households in Torrington, of which 24.3% had children under the age of 18 living in them. Of all households, 41.7% were married-couple households, 21.9% were households with a male householder and no spouse or partner present, and 30.3% were households with a female householder and no spouse or partner present. About 37.9% of all households were made up of individuals and 18.5% had someone living alone who was 65 years of age or older.

There were 2,684 housing units, of which 11.4% were vacant. The homeowner vacancy rate was 3.0% and the rental vacancy rate was 13.7%.

Racial composition as of the 2020 census
Race	Number	Percent
White	5,272	86.2%
Black or African American	63	1.0%
American Indian and Alaska Native	71	1.2%
Asian	38	0.6%
Native Hawaiian and Other Pacific Islander	1	0.0%
Some other race	281	4.6%
Two or more races	393	6.4%
Hispanic or Latino (of any race)	778	12.7%

=== 2010 census ===
As of the census of 2010, there were 6,501 people, 2,527 households, and 1,506 families living in the city. The population density was 1,407.1 inhabitants per square mile (543.3/km^{2}). There were 2,717 housing units at an average density of 588.1 per square mile (227.1/km^{2}). The racial makeup of the city was 93.2% White, 1.0% African American, 0.9% Native American, 0.5% Asian, 0.2% Pacific Islander, 3.0% from other races, and 1.3% from two or more races. Hispanic or Latino of any race were 11.3% of the population.

There were 2,527 households, of which 26.0% had children under the age of 18 living with them, 44.8% were married couples living together, 10.2% had a female householder with no husband present, 4.6% had a male householder with no wife present, and 40.4% were non-families. 34.5% of all households were made up of individuals, and 16.1% had someone living alone who was 65 years of age or older. The average household size was 2.21 and the average family size was 2.83.

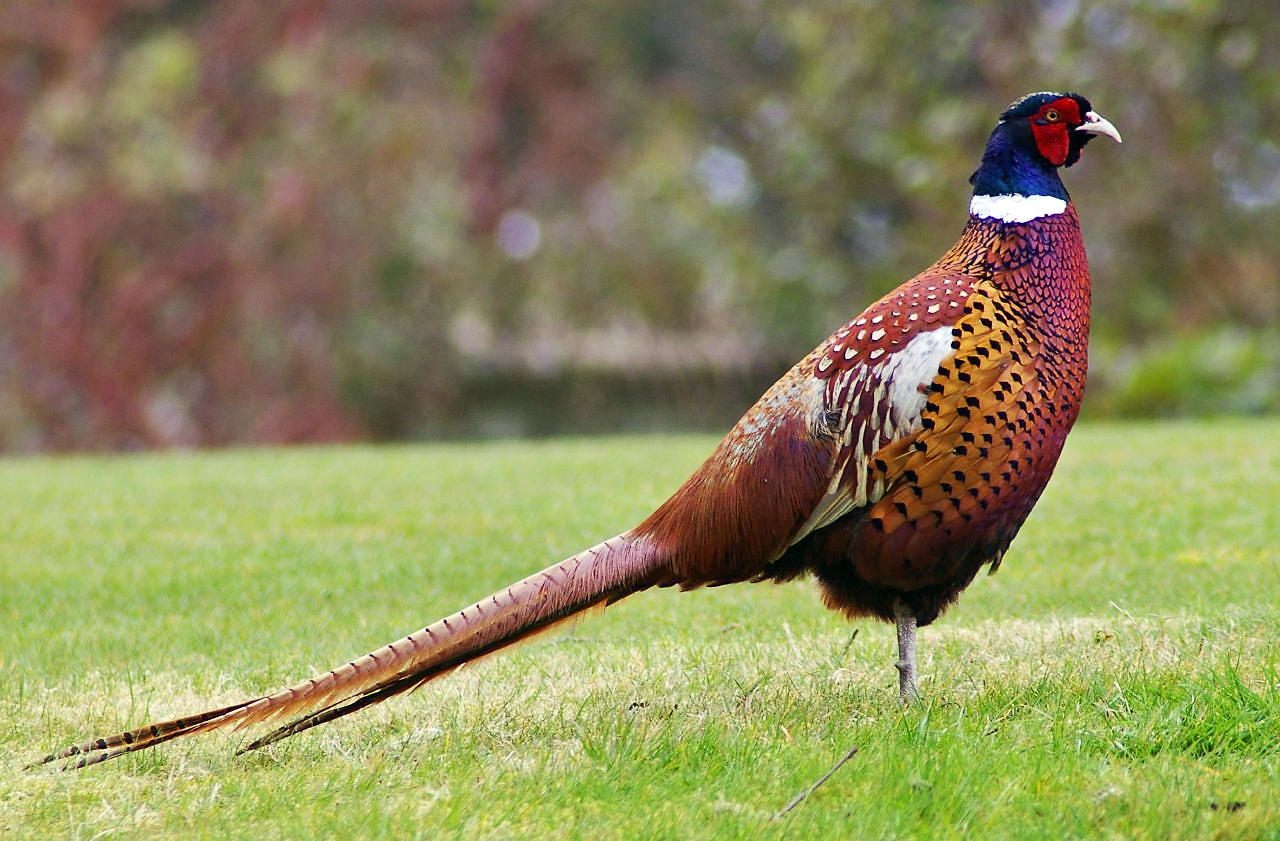
Torrington and Goshen County are home to a large population of Ring-necked Pheasants

The median age in the city was 41.4 years. 19.8% of residents were under the age of 18; 11.1% were between the ages of 18 and 24; 23.2% were from 25 to 44; 26.8% were from 45 to 64; and 19.3% were 65 years of age or older. The gender makeup of the city was 52.5% male and 47.5% female.

=== 2000 census ===
At the census of 2000, there were 5,776 people, 2,436 households, and 1,522 families living in the city. The population density was 1,617.4 people per square mile (624.7/km^{2}). There were 2,644 housing units at an average density of 740.4 per square mile (286.0/km^{2}). The racial makeup of the city was 93.49% White, 0.31% African American, 0.90% Native American, 0.29% Asian, 0.10% Pacific Islander, 3.65% from other races, and 1.25% from two or more races. Hispanic or Latino of any race were 9.47% of the population.

There were 2,436 households, out of which 26.7% had children under the age of 18 living with them, 49.9% were married couples living together, 9.9% had a female householder with no husband present, and 37.5% were non-families. 32.3% of all households were made up of individuals, and 17.3% had someone living alone who was 65 years of age or older. The average household size was 2.26 and the average family size was 2.86.

The age distribution was: 23.3% under the age of 18, 9.6% from 18 to 24, 23.1% from 25 to 44, 22.9% from 45 to 64, and 21.0% who were 65 years of age or older. The median age was 41 years. For every 100 females, there were 93.0 males. For every 100 females age 18 and over, there were 87.1 males.

The median income for a household in the city was $30,136, and the median income for a family was $40,750. Males had a median income of $31,058 versus $20,101 for females. The per capita income for the city was $16,026. About 9.3% of families and 13.3% of the population were below the poverty line, including 16.0% of those under age 18 and 11.3% of those age 65 or over.

== Government ==
The United States Postal Service operates the Torrington Post Office.

The Wyoming Medium Correctional Institution (WMCI) is located in Torrington. WMCI, a facility of the Wyoming Department of Corrections, serves as an intake center for male inmates not sentenced to death. It was opened on January 6, 2010, and the first 75 inmates to be housed there arrived on January 13, 2010. By 2015, it housed over 300 inmates.

== Education ==
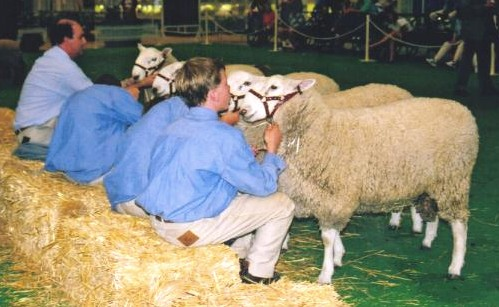
Prize sheep lined up for judging at a County Fair

Public education in Torrington is provided by Goshen County School District#1. Zoned campuses include Lincoln Elementary School (grades K–2), Trail Elementary School (grades 3–5), Torrington Middle School (grades 6–8), and Torrington High School (grades 9–12).

Other towns and communities included in the consolidated Goshen County School District include Lingle, LaGrange, Huntley, and Yoder, among others.

Eastern Wyoming College, located in Torrington, is a two-year community college serving the area, with outreach centers serving Platte, Niobrara, Converse, Weston and Crook counties.

Torrington has a public library, the Goshen County Library.

== Infrastructure ==
=== Highways ===
==== U.S. Highways ====
- U.S. Highway 26 East (Scottsbluff Road)
- U.S. Highway 26 West (Yellowstone Road)
- U.S. Highway 85 North (Lingle/Jay Em Road)
- U.S. Highway 85 South (Cheyenne Road)

==== State Routes ====
- WYO 92 (Huntley Highway)
- WYO 154 (Veteran Road)
- WYO 156 (Sugar Factory Road)
- WYO 159 (Van Tassell Road)

=== Airport ===
Torrington Municipal Airport is a city-owned, public-use airport located two nautical miles (4 km) east of the central business district of Torrington.

=== Public transport ===
Goshen County Senior Friendship Center provides paratransit services in Torrington on weekdays.

== Notable people ==
- Edward Buchanan (born 1967), former state legislator
- Stephanie Burns (born 1955), Organosilicon chemist, businesswoman
- William Curtis, founded Torrington in 1889
- Stanley Hathaway (1924–2005), 27th Governor of Wyoming
- Jerry Hill (born 1939), football player
- Michael Punke (born 1964), Author of The Revenant
- Leslie ZumBrunnen (1908–1997), politician

== See also ==
- List of municipalities in Wyoming
