= Kemmerer Municipal Airport =

- IATA: EMM; ICAO: KEMM; FAA LID: EMM

Summary
- Airport type: Public
- Owner: City of Kemmerer
- Serves: Kemmerer, Wyoming
- Elevation AMSL: 7,289 ft (2,222 m)
- Coordinates: 41°49′27″N 110°33′25″W
- Interactive map of Kemmerer Municipal Airport

Runways
Direction	Length		Surface
Direction	ft	m	Surface
4/22	2,671	814	Concrete
10/28	3,271	997	Turf/dirt
16/34	8,203	2,500	Asphalt

Statistics (2022)
- Aircraft operations (year ending 6/30/2022): 3,158
- Source: Federal Aviation Administration

Kemmerer Municipal Airport (IATA: EMM, ICAO: KEMM, FAA LID: EMM) is in Lincoln County, Wyoming, United States, two miles northwest of the city of Kemmerer, which owns it.

The FAA's National Plan of Integrated Airport Systems (2009-2013) categorizes it as a general aviation airport.

== Facilities ==
The airport covers 400 acres (160 ha) at an elevation of 7,289 feet (2,222 m). It has three runways: 4/22 is 2,671 by 60 feet (814 x 18 m) concrete; 10/28 is 3,271 by 60 feet (997 x 18 m) turf/dirt; 16/34 is 8,203 by 75 feet (2,500 x 23 m) asphalt.

In the year ending June 30,2022, the airport had 3,158 aircraft operations, an average of 61 per week: 98% general aviation, 1% military, and <1% air taxi.

== See also ==
- List of airports in Wyoming
