= Yoder, Wyoming =

- Town
- Location of Yoder in Goshen County, Wyoming.
- Coordinates: 41°55′01″N 104°17′43″W
- Country: United States
- State: Wyoming
- County: Goshen

Area
  - Total: 0.21 sq mi (0.55 km^{2})
  - Land: 0.21 sq mi (0.55 km^{2})
  - Water: 0 sq mi (0.00 km^{2})
- Elevation: 4,259 ft (1,298 m)

Population (2020)
  - Total: 131
  - Density: 615/sq mi (237.5/km^{2})
- Time zone: UTC-7 (Mountain (MST))
  - Summer (DST): UTC-6 (MDT)
- ZIP code: 82244
- Area code: 307
- GNIS feature ID: 2413522
- FIPS code: 56-86665

Yoder is a town in Goshen County, Wyoming, United States. The population was 131 at the 2020 census.

== Geography ==
According to the United States Census Bureau, the town has a total area of 0.21 square miles (0.54 km^{2}), all land.

== Demographics ==
Historical population
| Census | Pop. | Note | %± |
|---|---|---|---|
| 1930 | 266 | | — |
| 1940 | 201 | | −24.4% |
| 1950 | 128 | | −36.3% |
| 1960 | 83 | | −35.2% |
| 1970 | 101 | | 21.7% |
| 1980 | 110 | | 8.9% |
| 1990 | 136 | | 23.6% |
| 2000 | 169 | | 24.3% |
| 2010 | 151 | | −10.7% |
| 2020 | 131 | | −13.2% |
U.S. Decentennial Census 1930-2010

As of 2000 the median income for a household in the town was $40,781, and the median income for a family was $41,875. Males had a median income of $37,500 versus $15,000 for females. The per capita income for the town was $15,161. About 5.3% of families and 8.7% of the population were below the poverty line, including 6.3% of those under the age of eighteen and none of those 65 or over.

=== 2010 census ===
As of the census of 2010, there were 151 people, 68 households, and 44 families residing in the town. The population density was 719.0 inhabitants per square mile (277.6/km^{2}). There were 85 housing units at an average density of 404.8 per square mile (156.3/km^{2}). The racial makeup of the town was 97.4% White, 0.7% Pacific Islander, and 2.0% from two or more races. Hispanic or Latino of any race were 4.0% of the population.

There were 68 households, of which 19.1% had children under the age of 18 living with them, 54.4% were married couples living together, 7.4% had a female householder with no husband present, 2.9% had a male householder with no wife present, and 35.3% were non-families. 29.4% of all households were made up of individuals, and 17.7% had someone living alone who was 65 years of age or older. The average household size was 2.22 and the average family size was 2.73.

The median age in the town was 53.5 years. 21.2% of residents were under the age of 18; 3.3% were between the ages of 18 and 24; 14.6% were from 25 to 44; 31.1% were from 45 to 64; and 29.8% were 65 years of age or older. The gender makeup of the town was 51.7% male and 48.3% female.

== Education ==
Public education for the town of Yoder is provided by Goshen County School District #1.

== Highways ==
- U.S. Highway 85
- WYO 152
- WYO 154
