= Wyoming Highway 132 =

State highway in Fremont County, Wyoming, United States

Wyoming Highway 132
- Blue Sky Highway
- WYO 132 highlighted in red

Route information
- Maintained by WYDOT
- Length: 17.43 mi (28.05 km)

Major junctions
- South end: US 287 north of Boulder Flats
- North end: US 26 / WYO 133 in Johnstown

Location
- Country: United States
- State: Wyoming
- Counties: Fremont

Highway system
- Wyoming State Highway System; Interstate; US; State
← WYO 131	→ WYO 133

Wyoming Highway 132 (WYO 132) is a 17.43-mile (28.05 km) south–north state highway in Fremont County, Wyoming, United States, that connects U.S. Route 287 (US 287) north of Boulder Flats with U.S. Route 26 (US 26) in Johnstown, by way of Ethete.

== Route description ==
WYO 132, known locally as the Blue Sky Highway, lies entirely within the Wind River Indian Reservation.. Its southern terminus is immediately north of the census-designated place of Boulder Flats on US 287]. WYO 132 proceeds toward Ethete, approximately 7 miles (11 km) to the north. Before reaching Ethete, the highway intersects the west end of 17 Mile Road, which heads east for roughly 12 miles (19 km) before becoming Wyoming Highway 137. WYO 132 continues north to its northern terminus at US 26, for a total length of 17.43 miles (28.05 km). This intersection is also the southern terminus of Wyoming Highway 133.

== History ==
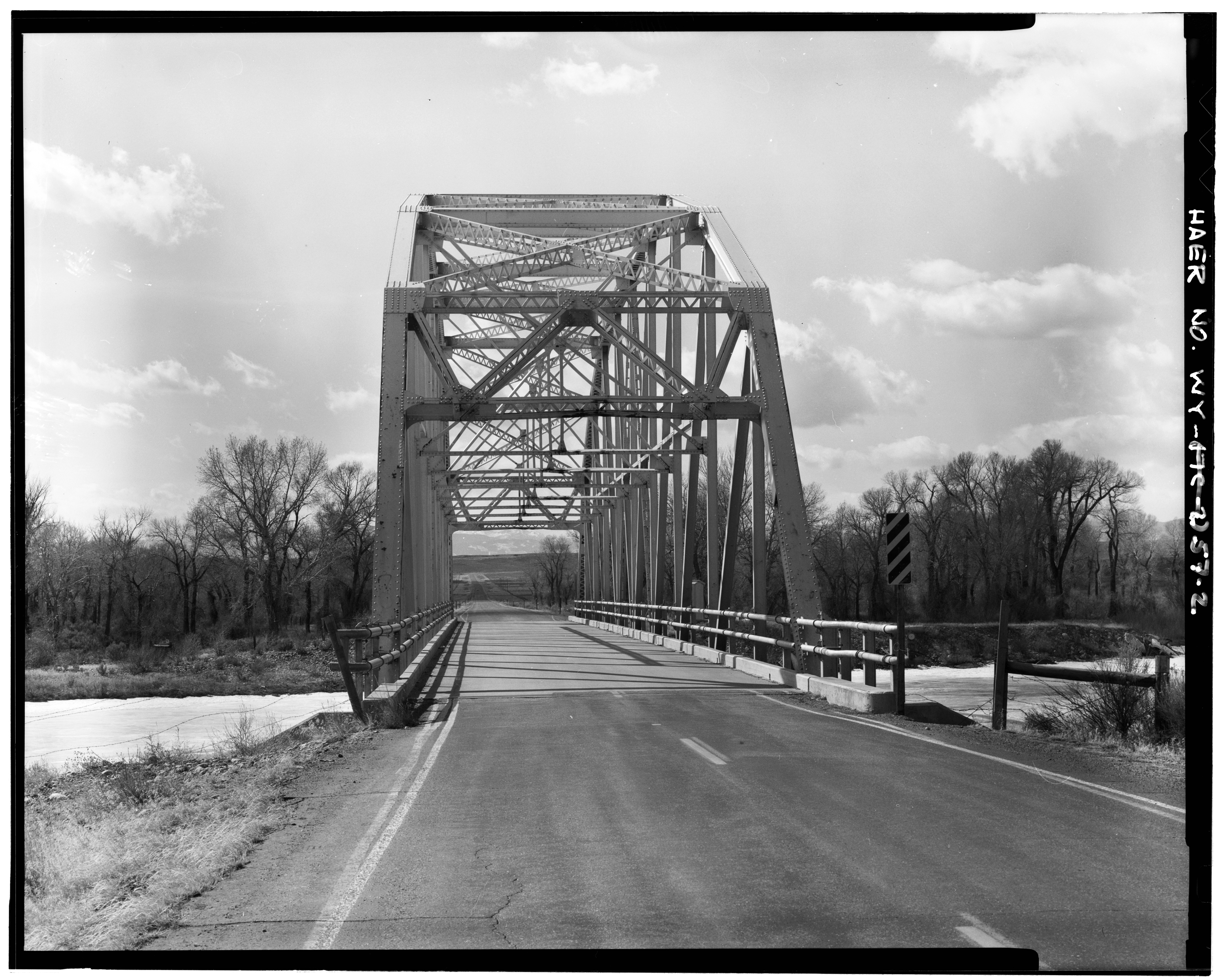
North across the former WYO 132 bridge over the Wind River

The bridge spanning the Wind River was deemed structurally unsafe after a vehicle accident in June 2006. A temporary detour bridge was put in place by September 2006, and a new permanent bridge opened to traffic in November 2007.

The WYO 132 improvement project involved roadwork between US 287 and Ethete. The first phase of asphalt paving was completed in November 2019, with final paving, chip sealing, and seeding scheduled for the following spring. The project included grading, drainage improvements, milling of asphalt pavement, placement of gravel layers, and installation of approach pipes and cattle guards. A pedestrian pathway between Ethete and Wyoming Indian High School was also scheduled for paving. The work was carried out by High Country Construction, Inc., based in Lander.

== Major intersections ==
The entire route is in Fremont County.

Location	mi	km	Destinations	Notes
	0.00	0.00	Ray Lake Road west – Ray Lake, US 287	Continuation west beyond southern terminus
	0.00	0.00	US 287 north – Fort Washakie, Yellowstone National Park US 287 south – Lander, Rawlins	Southern terminus; immediately north of Boulder Flasts
	4.69	7.55	17 Mile Road to WYO 137 – Arapahoe, Riverton	T intersection
Johnstown	17.43	28.05	US 26 east – Kinnear, Riverton US 26 west – Dubois, Yellowstone National Park	Northern teriminus
Johnstown	17.43	28.05	WYO 133 north (Pavillion Rd) – Pavillion	Continuation beyond northern terminus; southern end of WYO 133
1.000 mi = 1.609 km; 1.000 km = 0.621 mi

== See also ==
- List of state highways in Wyoming
