= Wyoming Highway 137 =

Former state highway in Wyoming, United States

Wyoming Highway 137
- 17 Mile Road
- WYO 137 highlighted in red

Route information
- Maintained by Wind River Indian Reservation
- Length: 8.79 mi (14.15 km)
- Existed: ?–c. 2015

Major junctions
- West end: 17 Mile Road east of Ethete
- East end: WYO 789 south of Riverton

Location
- Country: United States
- State: Wyoming
- Counties: Fremont

Highway system
- Wyoming State Highway System; Interstate; US; State
| ← WYO 136 | → WYO 138 |

Wyoming Highway 137 (WYO 137) was a 8.79-mile-long (14.15 km) east–west Wyoming State Road in central Fremont County.

== Route description ==
Wyoming Highway 137 began its western end at 17 mile Road, east of Ethete, and northwest of Arapahoe, a census-designated place (CDP). 17 Mile Road continues west from here to Wyoming Highway 132 near Ethete. Highway 137 traveled eastward and intersected the northern terminus of Wyoming Highway 138 in the unincorporated community of St. Stephens at just over five miles. WYO 137 turned east-northeast for the remainder of its route and ended 3 miles later at Wyoming Highway 789 south of Riverton. The entire route was located within the Wind River Indian Reservation.

== History ==
Upon completion of various roadway improvement projects along the route circa 2013, the Wyoming Department of Transportation turned control of WYO 137 over to tribal control by 2015. The road remains open to the public, with maintenance and law enforcement duties residing with the Northern Arapaho and Eastern Shoshone tribes.

== Major intersections ==
The entire route was in Fremont County.

| Location | mi | km | Destinations | Notes |
|---|---|---|---|---|
| | 0.00 | 0.00 | 17 Mile Road | |
| Arapahoe | 5.76 | 9.27 | WYO 138 | Northern terminus of WYO 138 |
| Arapahoe | 8.79 | 14.15 | WYO 789 | |
1.000 mi = 1.609 km; 1.000 km = 0.621 mi
