= Popo Agie =

Popo Agie may refer to:

- Popo Agie Formation, Triassic geologic formation
- Popo Agie Wilderness, located within Shoshone National Forest, Wyoming
- Popo Agie River, including:
  - Little Popo Agie River
  - Middle Popo Agie River
  - North Popo Agie River
