= Sinks Canyon State Park =

State park in Wyoming, United States

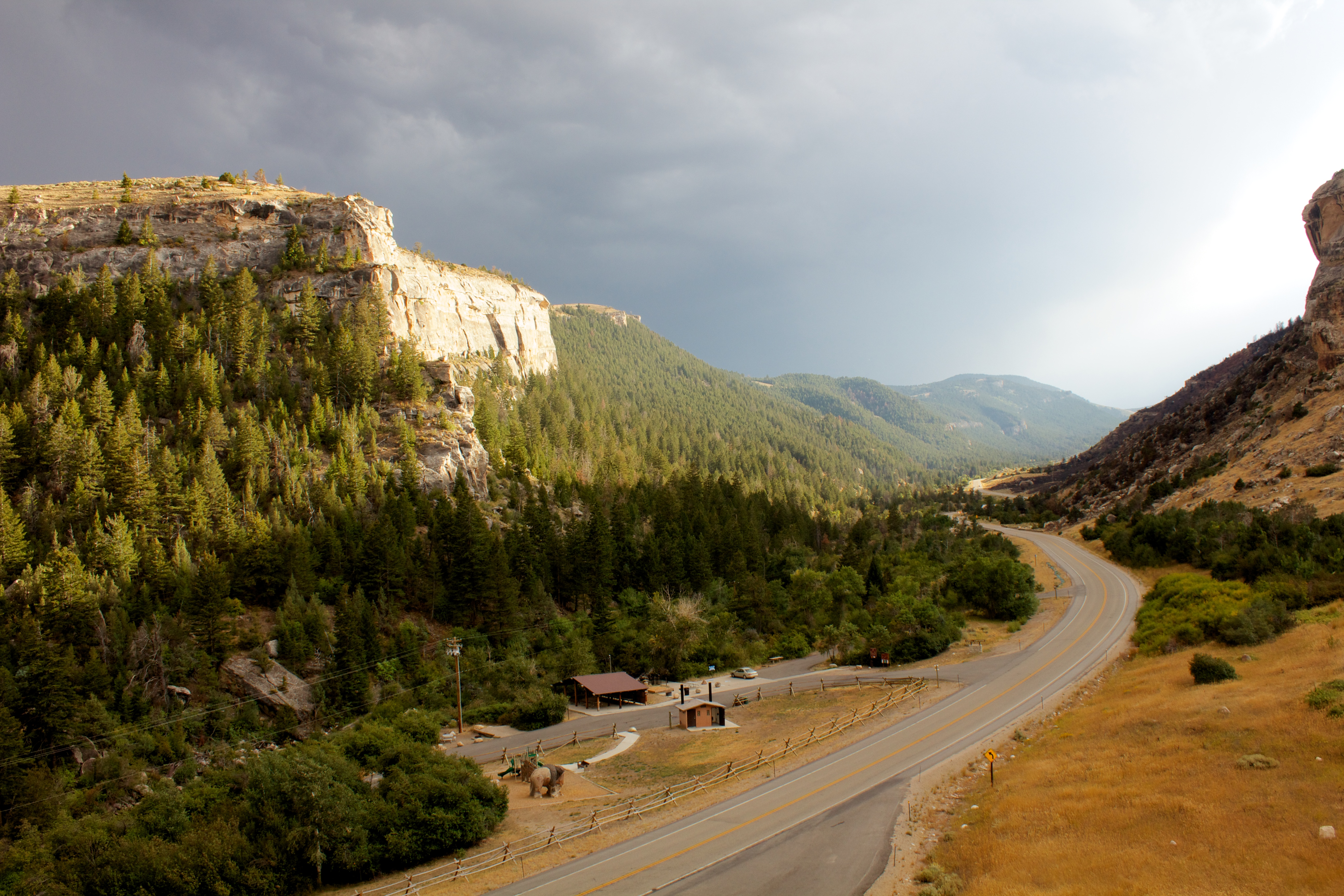
- Looking west from the entrance of the canyon

- Location within Wyoming
- Location: Fremont County, Wyoming, United States
- Nearest city: Lander
- Coordinates: 42°43′22″N 108°52′30″W
- Area: 600 acres (240 ha)
- Elevation: 6,122 ft (1,866 m)
- Established: 1971
- Administrator: Wyoming State Parks, Historic Sites & Trails
- Designation: Wyoming state park
- Website: Official website

Sinks Canyon State Park is a public recreation and nature preservation area located in the Wind River Range, six miles (9.7 km) southwest of Lander, Wyoming, on Wyoming Highway 131. The state park is named for a portion of the Middle Fork of the Popo Agie River where it flows into an underground limestone cavern, named "the Sinks," and emerges a quarter-mile down the canyon in a pool named "the Rise." The park is managed by the Wyoming Division of State Parks and Historic Sites.

== History ==
Human activity in Sinks Canyon goes back many thousands of years: archaeological digs have found hearths and tools carbon dated as far back as the last ice age. Since the late 19th century, the canyon and its river have been utilized for a variety of purposes. A saw mill, small hydroelectric dam and power plant, and ski area have all operated in the canyon.

Power plant

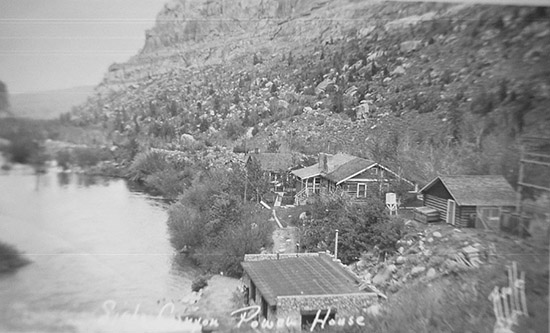
The Rise Power Plant, 1920

A hydroelectric dam and power plant were built in the canyon in the late 1910s by the Sinks Canyon Hydro Power Company and became operational by January 1920. The purpose of the plant was to supply nearby Lander with more reliable electricity. Power generation was possible most of the year except during winter months because water levels become too low. The design of the system consisted of a small stone-concrete dam standing 9 feet high and 60 feet wide built on the Popo Agie River a short distance upstream. The dam connected to the power house located at the Rise via a 3,145 foot long riveted-steel pipeline with a diameter of between 30 and 26 inches. The pipeline allowed water to flow at a rate of 17 feet per second until reaching the power house. The power house contained two 47 inch 250 horsepower hug impulse wheels, each spun by two 3 inch diameter water nozzles. The two wheels were controlled by two separate Lombard oil-pressure governors which were connected to a 150-kilowatt 3 phase 60 cycle alternating-current generator operating at 2,300 volts. The power was transmitted at 11,000 volts over a copper circuit suspended by cedar poles to Lander and South Pass City as well as some oil extraction projects in the area. The plant operated until around 1954 when it was shut down due to its age and cheaper sources of electricity becoming available.

State park

Large portions of the canyon were purchased by the state in 1939 and 1953 to be set aside as a wildlife habitat and to protect the fishery. In 1963, Pacific Power and Light Company donated the Rise and the seven acres surrounding it to the city of Lander for use as a park. In 1970, city and state officials working with the state legislature and private citizens created Sinks Canyon State Park, the first park created under the newly formed Wyoming Recreation Commission. The bill creating the park was signed in 1971. A new overlook was built at the Rise in 1972; the visitor center was completed in 1973.

== Natural history ==
Geology

The Madison Limestone Formation was carved by glacial movement, leaving extensive underground fissures and steep cliff walls. The gradual recession of the ice left glacial moraines along the canyon floor. The canyon is the second most southerly of the many canyons along the eastern slope of the Wind River Range.

The Rise

The exact route of the passage is unknown, and dye tests have shown that the water takes over 2 hours to make its 1/4-mile underground journey. Additionally, more water flows from the Rise than enters the cavern at the Sink. The Crow Indian name of the river, "Popo Agie" (pronounced po-PO-shuh), is taken to mean "gurgling river."

Plant life

The canyon has a wide variety of plant species which differ depending on elevation and location. Numerous types of grass, trees, shrubs and other species of plants grow throughout the canyon. The canyon's area is generally divided into two main ecological zones: a subarid environment that is mainly populated by sagebrush and a pine-fir montane forest zone.

Trees

The timberline in the region is roughly between 7,217 and 8,530 feet above sea level. Most trees in the canyon grow on the north-facing wall, and the concentration of different species depends on the different ecological zones within the canyon. Common tree species include aspen, subalpine fir, Douglas fir, lodgepole pine, Engelmann spruce, and whitebark pine. Trees growing within the canyon can live for hundreds of years. Studies of tree rings conducted on Douglas fir in the canyon have found trees which started growing as early as 1649, though some of the trees were deceased at the time of sampling.

Wildlife

Wildlife, including prairie rattlesnakes, bull snakes, mule deer, and yellow-bellied marmots, is diverse and abundant in the area. Some 94 species of birds have been observed within the canyon including golden eagles and prairie falcons.

== Tourism and Activities ==
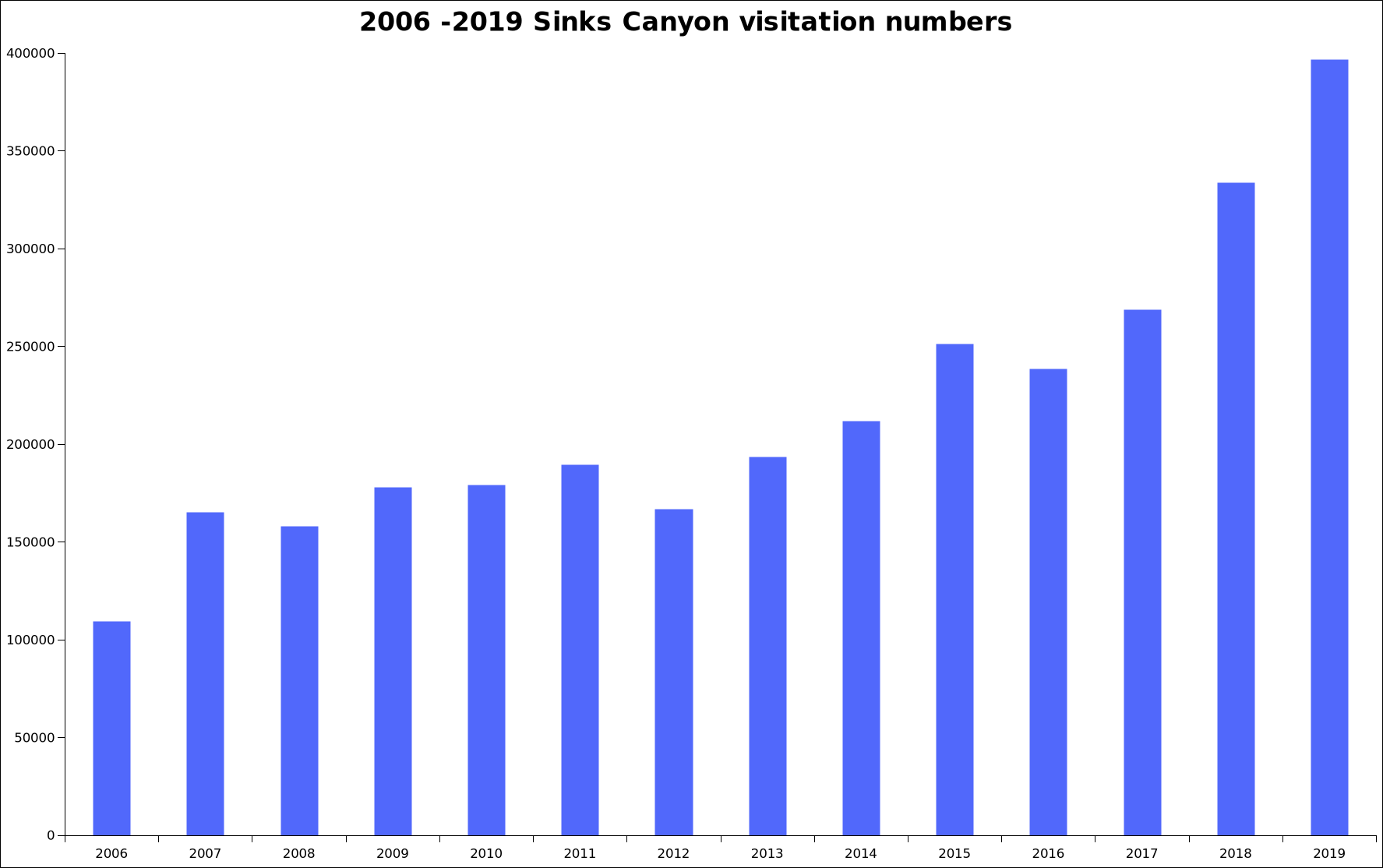
Sinks Canyon State Park annual visitation numbers from 2006 to 2019.

Park visitation numbers have steady grown over time and have gone up significantly since 2018. Increasing tourism numbers has brought up the issue of the impacts to the canyon's overall ecological health. Between 2009 and 2019 visitation numbers more than doubled from 177,922 visitors counted in 2009 to 396,820 in 2019. Though the park is managed by the Wyoming State Parks Department, the US Forest Service and the Bureau of Land Management, it is mostly owned by the Wyoming Game and Fish Commission. This creates a patchwork of rules and other requirements which govern tourism development and conservation in the canyon.

A visitor center is located at the Sinks, and an observation deck overlooks the Rise. The park offers hiking trails and facilities for camping, picnicking, rock climbing, and fishing. Above the canyon there are several lakes and other recreational areas such as Worthen Meadow Reservoir which offer access to trails and additional camping.

== Climate ==
Temperatures and precipitation

The climate in the canyon is consistent with the surrounding area with warm dry summers and cold winters with snow. Summers in the canyon can be hot with temperatures above 90 degrees Fahrenheit. Winters can be cold to warm depending on the side of the canyon. Most precipitation falls in spring and fall, and the snow pack accumulates mostly on the north facing side of the canyon.

Townsend Creek is a SNOTEL weather station located roughly halfway between Worthen Meadow Reservoir and Frye Lake at an altitude of 8700 feet (2652 m). Townsend Creek has a subalpine climate (Köppen Dfc), with long, cold winters and short, mild summers.

Climate data for Townsend Creek, Wyoming, 1991–2020 normals, 2010-2020 snowfall: 8700ft (2652m)
Month	Jan	Feb	Mar	Apr	May	Jun	Jul	Aug	Sep	Oct	Nov	Dec	Year
Record high °F (°C)	59 (15)	57 (14)	62 (17)	70 (21)	80 (27)	84 (29)	91 (33)	88 (31)	83 (28)	72 (22)	64 (18)	53 (12)	91 (33)
Mean maximum °F (°C)	49.9 (9.9)	49.3 (9.6)	55.8 (13.2)	61.7 (16.5)	69.6 (20.9)	77.6 (25.3)	82.8 (28.2)	81.4 (27.4)	76.1 (24.5)	66.2 (19.0)	54.6 (12.6)	47.2 (8.4)	83.5 (28.6)
Mean daily maximum °F (°C)	34.1 (1.2)	34.7 (1.5)	41.5 (5.3)	46.1 (7.8)	54.4 (12.4)	65.0 (18.3)	73.9 (23.3)	72.1 (22.3)	62.3 (16.8)	49.5 (9.7)	39.0 (3.9)	32.0 (0.0)	50.4 (10.2)
Daily mean °F (°C)	20.2 (−6.6)	20.2 (−6.6)	27.2 (−2.7)	32.9 (0.5)	41.5 (5.3)	50.1 (10.1)	57.4 (14.1)	56.0 (13.3)	47.7 (8.7)	36.7 (2.6)	26.2 (−3.2)	19.1 (−7.2)	36.3 (2.4)
Mean daily minimum °F (°C)	6.3 (−14.3)	5.6 (−14.7)	12.7 (−10.7)	19.5 (−6.9)	28.4 (−2.0)	35.1 (1.7)	40.9 (4.9)	39.9 (4.4)	33.0 (0.6)	23.8 (−4.6)	13.4 (−10.3)	6.2 (−14.3)	22.1 (−5.5)
Mean minimum °F (°C)	−17.0 (−27.2)	−18.2 (−27.9)	−11.2 (−24.0)	−0.6 (−18.1)	12.6 (−10.8)	25.9 (−3.4)	32.2 (0.1)	29.9 (−1.2)	19.8 (−6.8)	3.1 (−16.1)	−11.6 (−24.2)	−18.5 (−28.1)	−24.7 (−31.5)
Record low °F (°C)	−29 (−34)	−32 (−36)	−27 (−33)	−15 (−26)	−2 (−19)	19 (−7)	23 (−5)	20 (−7)	3 (−16)	−16 (−27)	−26 (−32)	−40 (−40)	−40 (−40)
Average precipitation inches (mm)	1.25 (32)	1.60 (41)	2.51 (64)	3.67 (93)	3.90 (99)	1.86 (47)	1.00 (25)	1.11 (28)	1.90 (48)	2.37 (60)	1.72 (44)	1.40 (36)	24.29 (617)
Average snowfall inches (cm)	11.1 (28)	18.3 (46)	17.4 (44)	24.4 (62)	12.9 (33)	0.0 (0.0)	0.0 (0.0)	0.0 (0.0)	2.0 (5.1)	7.3 (19)	11.1 (28)	14.0 (36)	118.5 (301.1)
Source 1: XMACIS2 (records, monthly max/mins & Lander 5.7SW snowfall)
Source 2: NOAA (Precipitation)

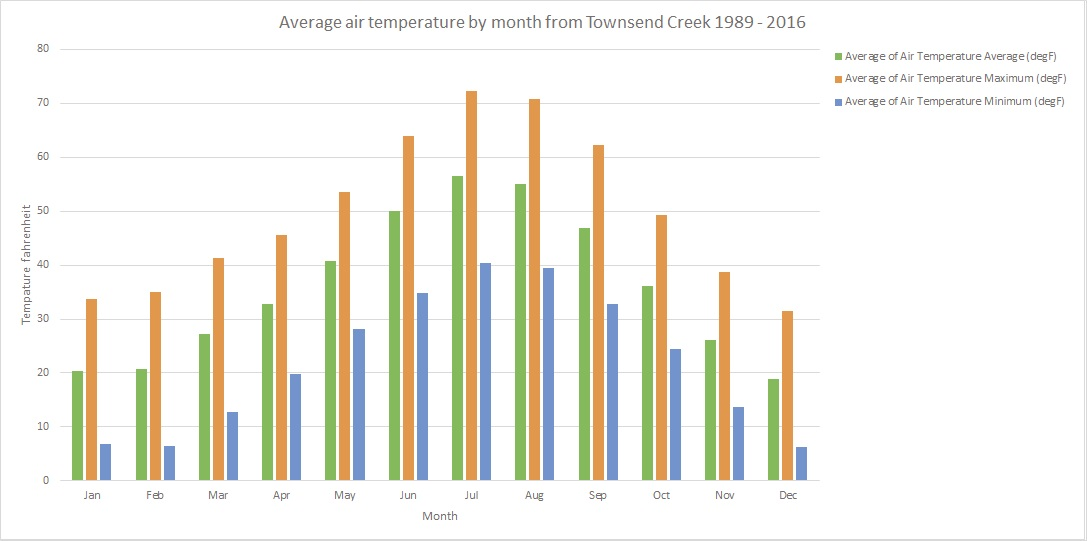
The average monthly air temperature recorded at the Townsend Creek Snotel site from 1989 to 2016

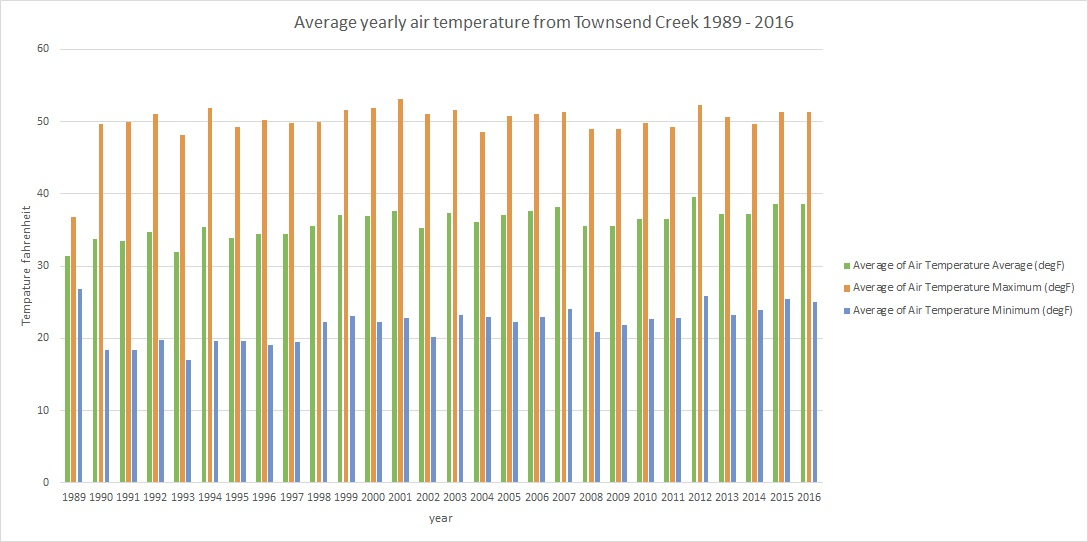
The average yearly air temperature recorded from the Townsend Creek Snotel Site from 1989 to 2016

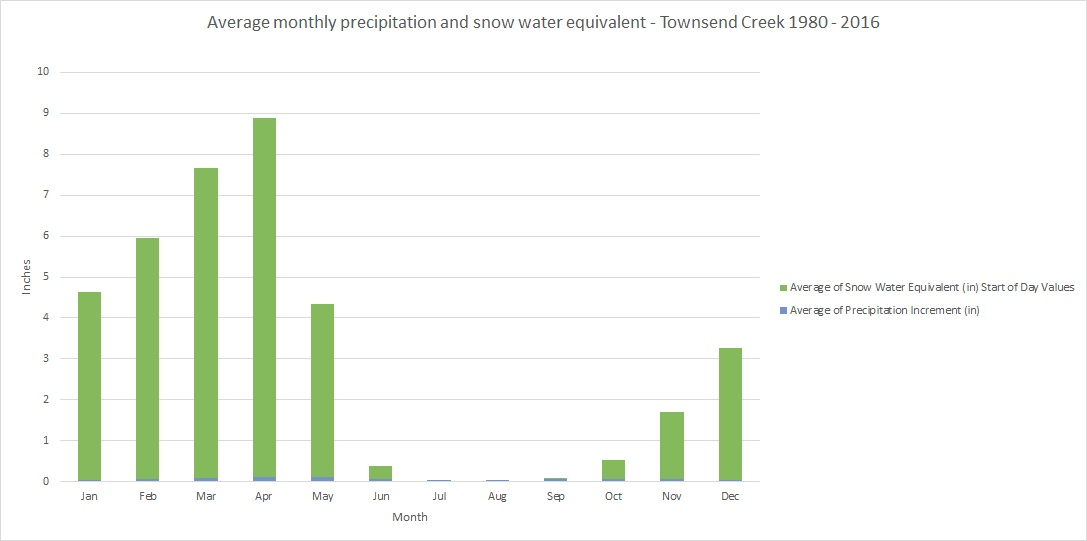
The average monthly precipitation and snow water equivalent recorded at Townsend Creek Snotel Site from 1980 to 2016

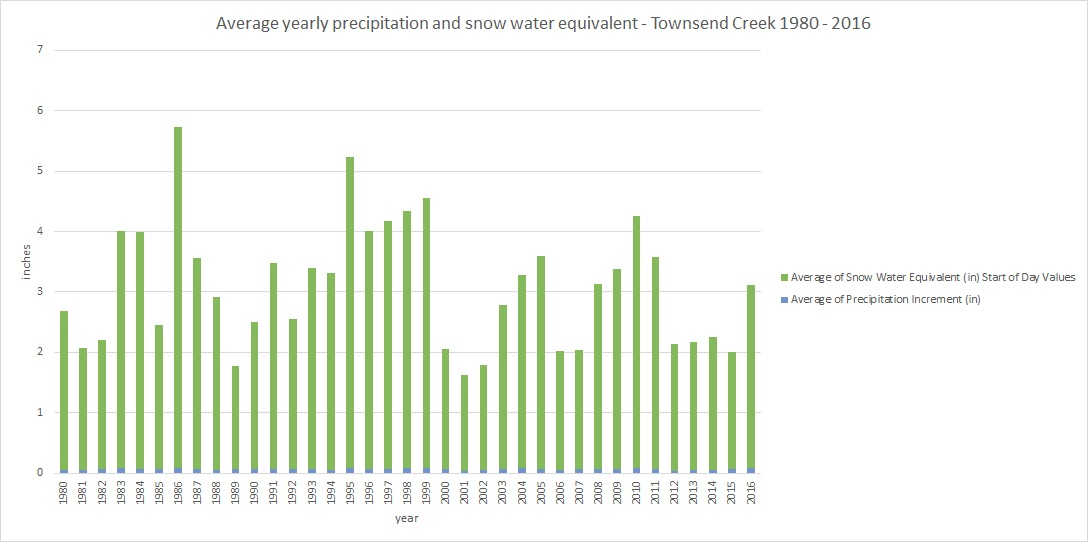
The average yearly precipitation and snow water equivalent recorded at the Townsend Creek Snotel site from 1980 to 2016

== Images ==
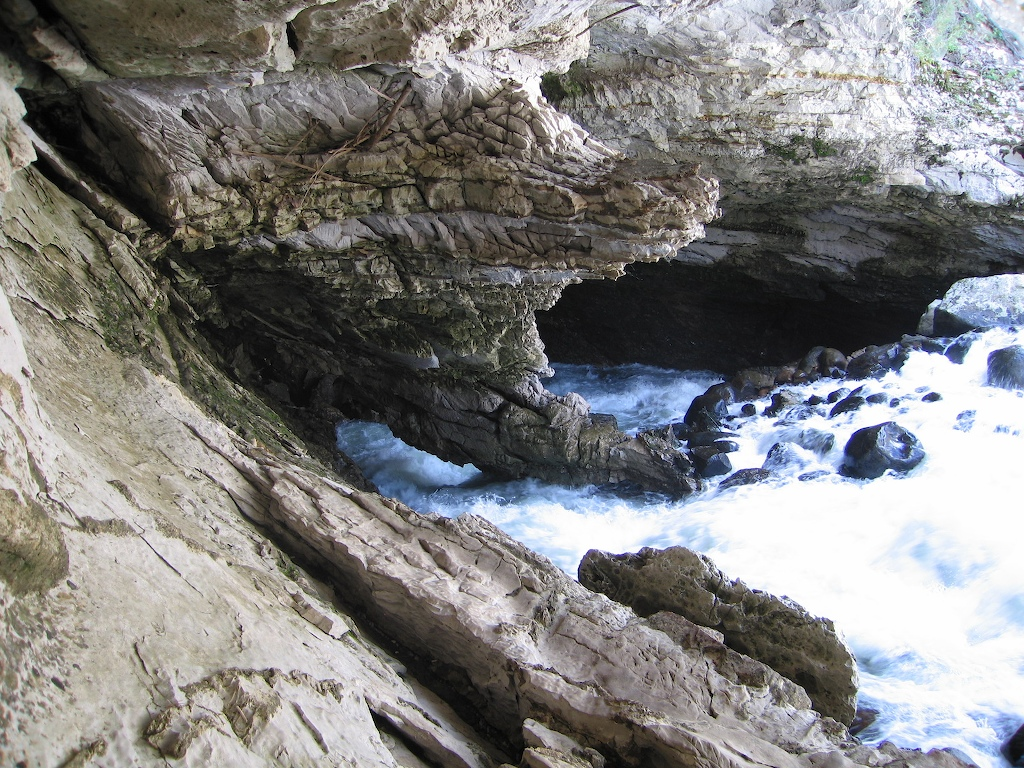
The Sinks

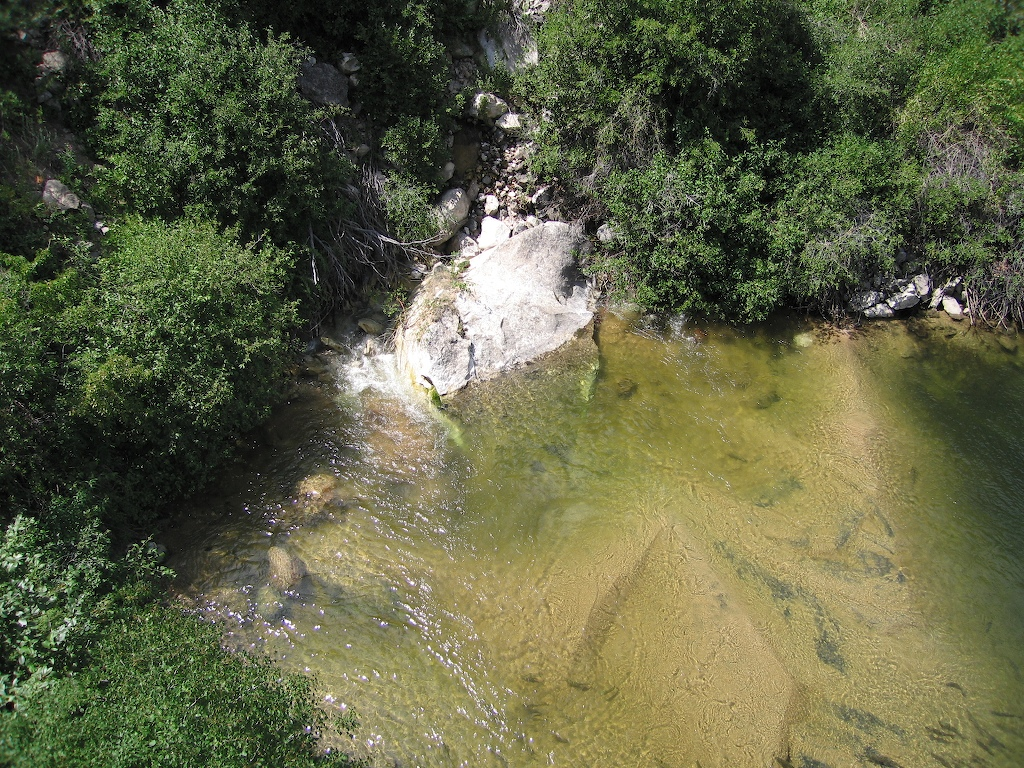
The Rise

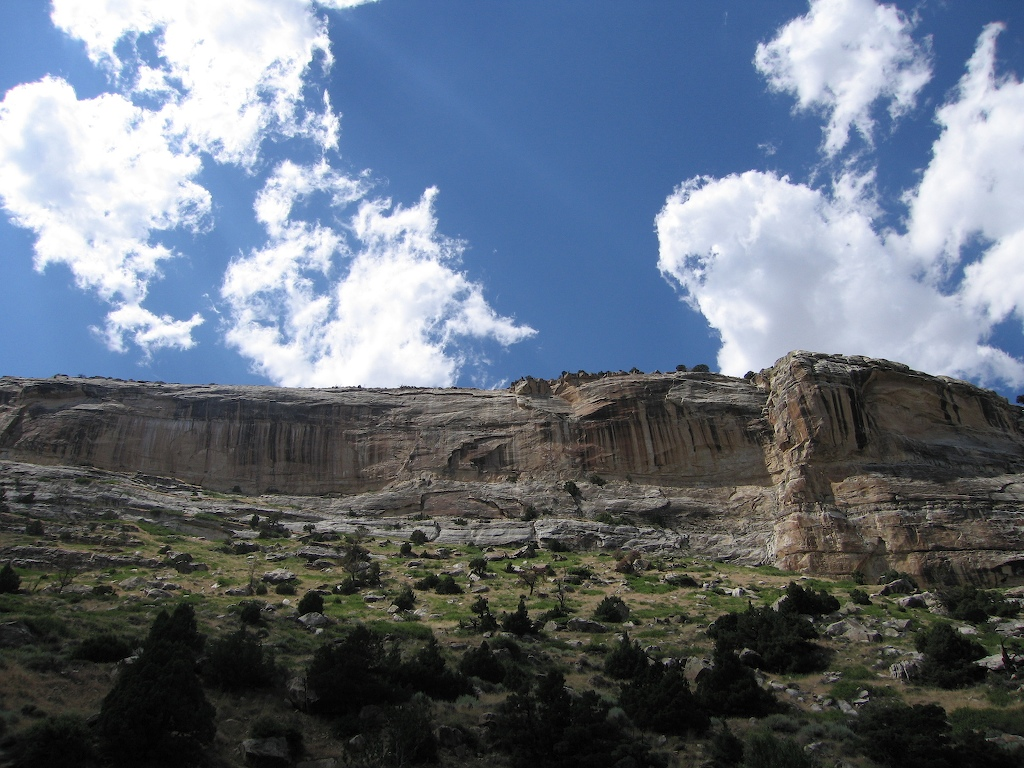
Canyon walls

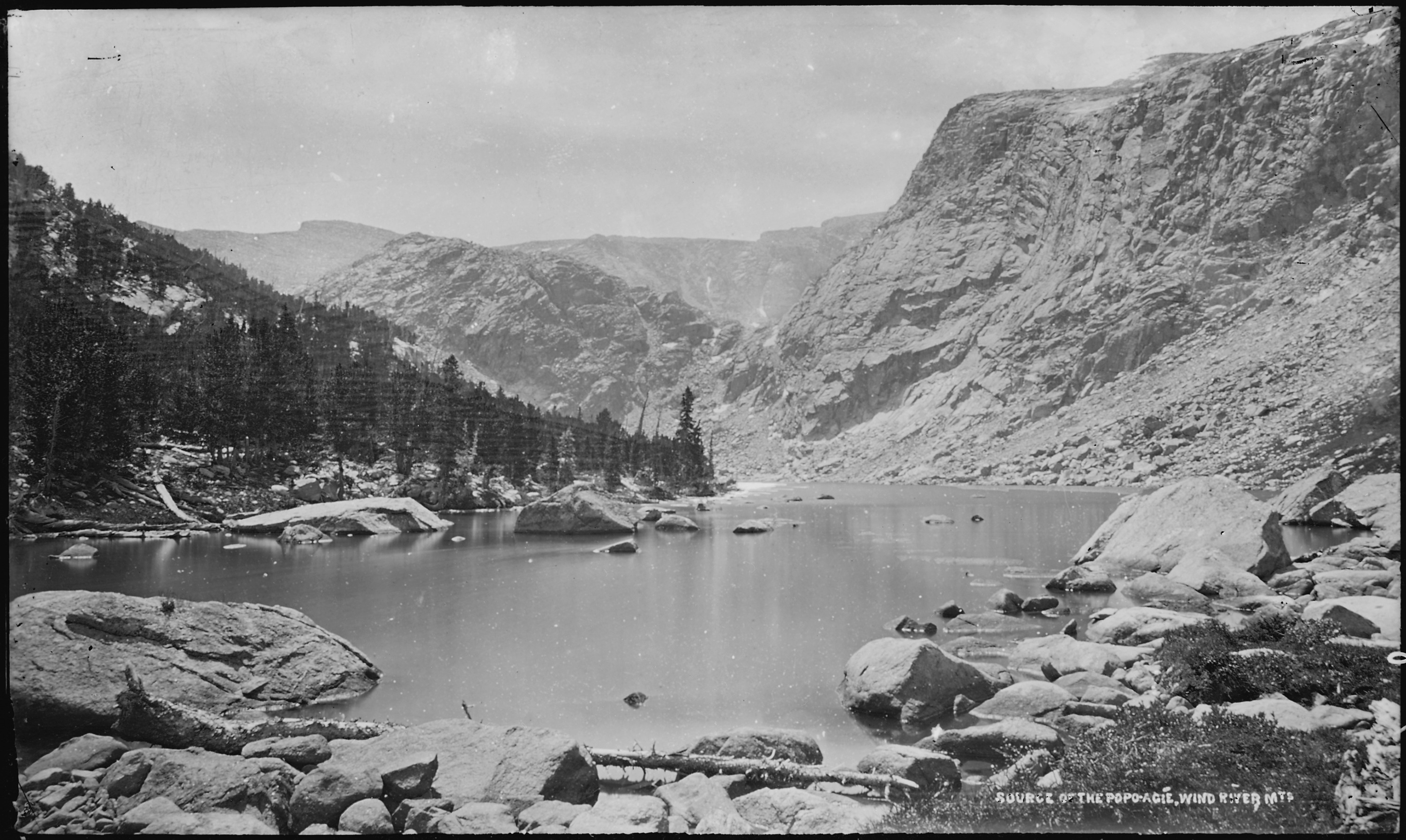
Source of the Popo Agie
