= Wyoming Highway 138 =

Former state highway in Wyoming, United States

Wyoming Highway 138
- Rendezvous Road
- WYO 138 highlighted in red

Route information
- Maintained by Wind River Indian Reservation
- Length: 8.14 mi (13.10 km)
- Existed: ?–2010

Major junctions
- West end: WYO 789 east of Hudson
- East end: WYO 137 in St. Stephens

Location
- Country: United States
- State: Wyoming
- Counties: Fremont

Highway system
- Wyoming State Highway System; Interstate; US; State
← WYO 137	→ WYO 139

Wyoming Highway 138 (WYO 138) was a 8.14-mile-long (13.10 km) east-west (southwest-northeast) Wyoming State Road in central Fremont County.

== Route description ==
Wyoming Highway 138 began on its western end at Wyoming Highway 789 east of Hudson. WYO 138 proceeded in a northeasterly direction, and traveled through the community (CDP) of Arapahoe. Just northeast of Arapahoe, WYO 138 reached Wyoming Highway 137 in the unincorporated community of St. Stephens where it ended. Together with WYO 137, Highway 138 provided an alternate to WYO 789 by staying closer to the Popo Agie River.

== History ==
A resolution to relinquish the highway to the Bureau of Indian Affairs was approved by the Transportation Commission of Wyoming at a meeting on December 9, 2010.

== Major intersections ==
The entire route was in Fremont County.

Location	mi	km	Destinations	Notes
	0.00	0.00	WYO 789	
Arapahoe	8.14	13.10	WYO 137	
1.000 mi = 1.609 km; 1.000 km = 0.621 mi
