= Wyoming Highway 134 =

State highway in Wyoming, United States

Wyoming Highway 134
- Missouri Valley Road
- WYO 134 highlighted in red

Route information
- Maintained by WYDOT
- Length: 24.17 mi (38.90 km)

Major junctions
- West end: WYO 133 near Pavillion
- East end: US 26 / WYO 789

Location
- Country: United States
- State: Wyoming
- Counties: Fremont

Highway system
- Wyoming State Highway System; Interstate; US; State
← WYO 133	→ WYO 135

Wyoming Highway 134 (WYO 134) is a 24.17-mile-long (38.90 km) east–west Wyoming State Road in northern Fremont County.

== Route description ==
Wyoming Highway 134 begins at Wyoming Highway 133 (Pavillion Road) just south of Pavillion. WYO 134, named Missouri Valley Road, travels eastward through the northern part of the county, passing north of Ocean Lake and the Ocean Lake Wildlife Habitat Management Area At just over 24 miles, Highway 134 reaches its eastern end at US Route 26/Wyoming Highway 789 southwest of Shoshoni and the Boysen Reservoir.

Wyoming Highway 133 and Highway 134 provide a shorter alternate around US 26 and Riverton saving approximately six miles.

== Major intersections ==
The entire route is in Fremont County.

Location	mi	km	Destinations	Notes
	0.00	0.00	WYO 133 – Kinnear, Pavillion	
	6.07	9.77	US 26 / WYO 789 – Riverton, Shoshoni	
1.000 mi = 1.609 km; 1.000 km = 0.621 mi
