= Wyoming Highway 133 =

State highway in Fremont County, Wyoming, United States

Wyoming Highway 133
- Pavillion Road
- WYO 133 highlighted in red

Route information
- Maintained by WYDOT
- Length: 6.07 mi (9.77 km)

Major junctions
- South end: US 26 / WYO 132 in Johnstown
- WYO 134 south of Pavillion
- North end: W Pavillion Rd / W Center Ave in Pavillion

Location
- Country: United States
- State: Wyoming
- Counties: Fremont

Highway system
- Wyoming State Highway System; Interstate; US; State
← WYO 132	→ WYO 134

Wyoming Highway 133 (WYO 133) is a 6.07-mile (9.77 km) north–south state highway in north-central Fremont County, Wyoming, United States, that connects U.S. Route 26 (US 26) in Johnstonw with Pavillion.

== Route description ==
WYO 132, known locally as the Pavillion Road, begins at US 26 and the northern end of Wyoming Highway 132 (Blue Sky Highway) in on the norther edge of the census-designated place of Johnstown. Highway 133 proceeds due north toward Pavillion. At almost 4.1 miles (6.6 km), the western terminus of Wyoming Highway 134 (WYO 134) is intersected which heads east towards US 26 / WY 789 and Shoshoni.

Past WYO 134, Pavillion is reached where the highway has its northern terminus at 6.07 miles (9.77 km) and the intersection of West Pavillion Road, North Pavillion Road, and West Center Ave.

WYO 133 and WYO 134 provide a shorter alternate to US 26 for traffic traveling between Jackson and Casper by bypassing Riverton.

== Major intersections ==
The entire route is in Fremont County.

Location	mi	km	Destinations	Notes
Johnstown	0.00	0.00	WYO 132 (Blue Sky Hwy)	Continuation south beyond terminus northern end of WYO 132
Johnstown	0.00	0.00	US 26 east – Kinnear, Riverton US 26 west – Dubois, Yellowstone National Park	Southern terminus
	4.06	6.53	WYO 134 east (Missouri Valley Rd) – US 26, Shoshoni	Western end of WYO 134
Pavillion	6.07	9.77	West Center Ave east West Pavillion Rd west – US 26	Northern terminus
Pavillion	6.07	9.77	North Pavillion Rd north	Continuation north beyond northern terminus
1.000 mi = 1.609 km; 1.000 km = 0.621 mi

== See also ==
- List of state highways in Wyoming
