= Middle Popo Agie River =

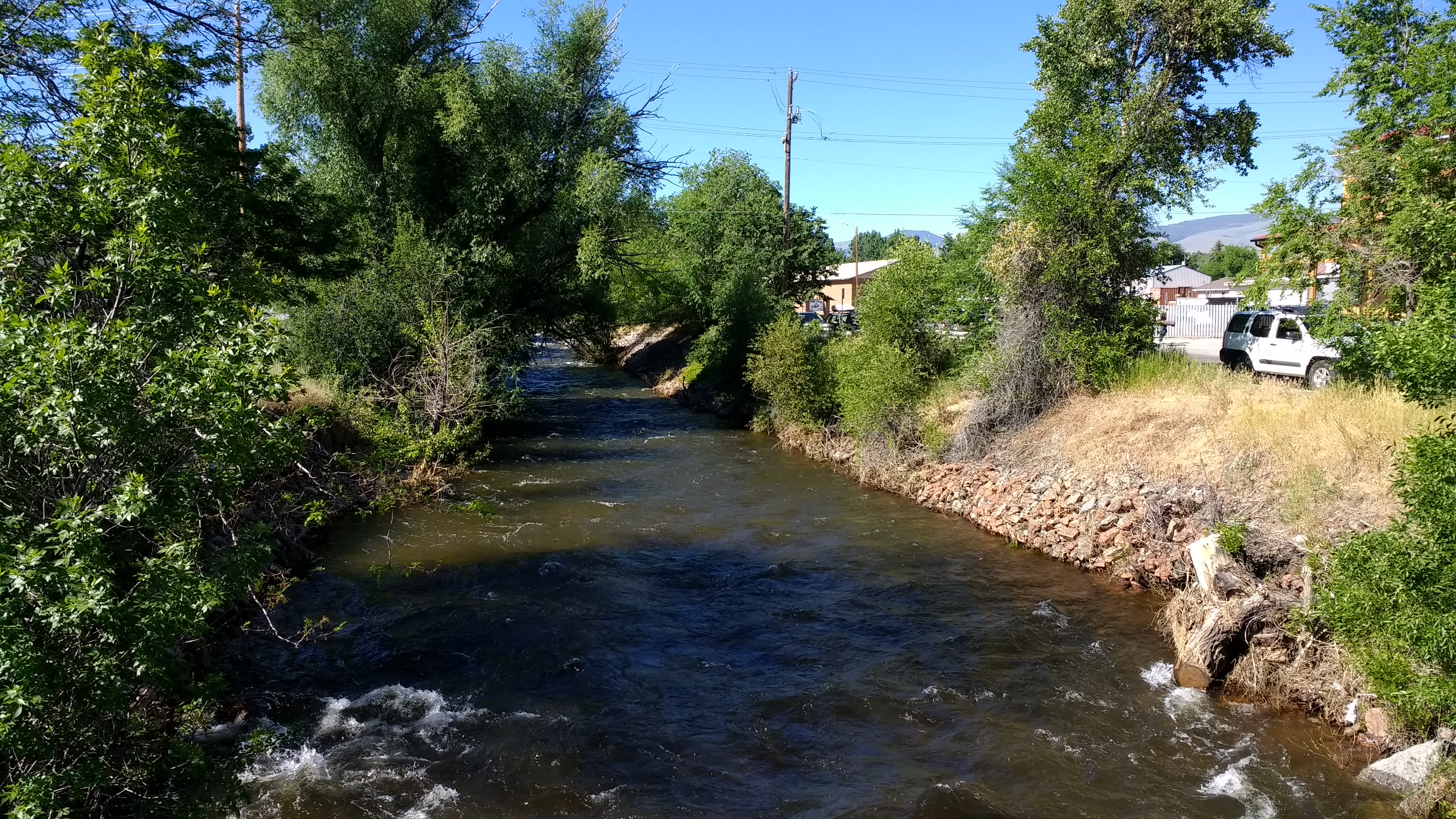
- The Middle Popo Agie River seen from Main Street in Lander, Wyoming

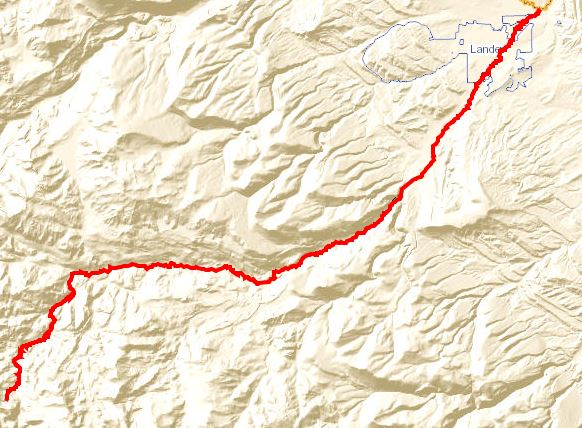
- The Flow of the Middle Popo Agie from source to confluence.
- Etymology: word po-PO-shuh, meaning "Head River" or possibly "Gurgling River"

Location
- Country: United States
- State: Wyoming
- City: Lander, Wyoming

Physical characteristics
- Source: Sweetwater Gap
  - location: Wind River Range, Fremont County
  - elevation: 12,000 ft (3,700 m)
- Mouth: Popo Agie River
  - location: Fort McGraw
  - coordinates: 42°51′14″N 108°42′00″W
  - elevation: 5,000 ft (1,500 m)
- Length: 54 mi (87 km)

Basin features
- Tributaries
  - left: Baldwin Creek, Beason Creek
  - right: Sawmill Creek, Red Canyon Creek,Roaring Fork Creek

The Middle Popo Agie River (also known as the Middle Fork Popo Agie River) is a river in Fremont County, Wyoming, United States. The river is 54 miles (87 km) long. It is sometimes referred to as simply the "Middle Fork". The river is part of the Popo Agie Watershed. From its headwaters in the Wind River Range until it joins with the North Popo Agie River to form the Popo Agie River in the Wind River Basin, the river and its tributaries irrigate roughly 11,503 acres.

The river is notable for passing underground through a sinkhole in Sinks Canyon State Park, only to emerge several hundred yards downstream at "the rise." The ground distance is not far, but tests with dye have shown it takes the water many hours to flow through the underground passage.

== Course ==
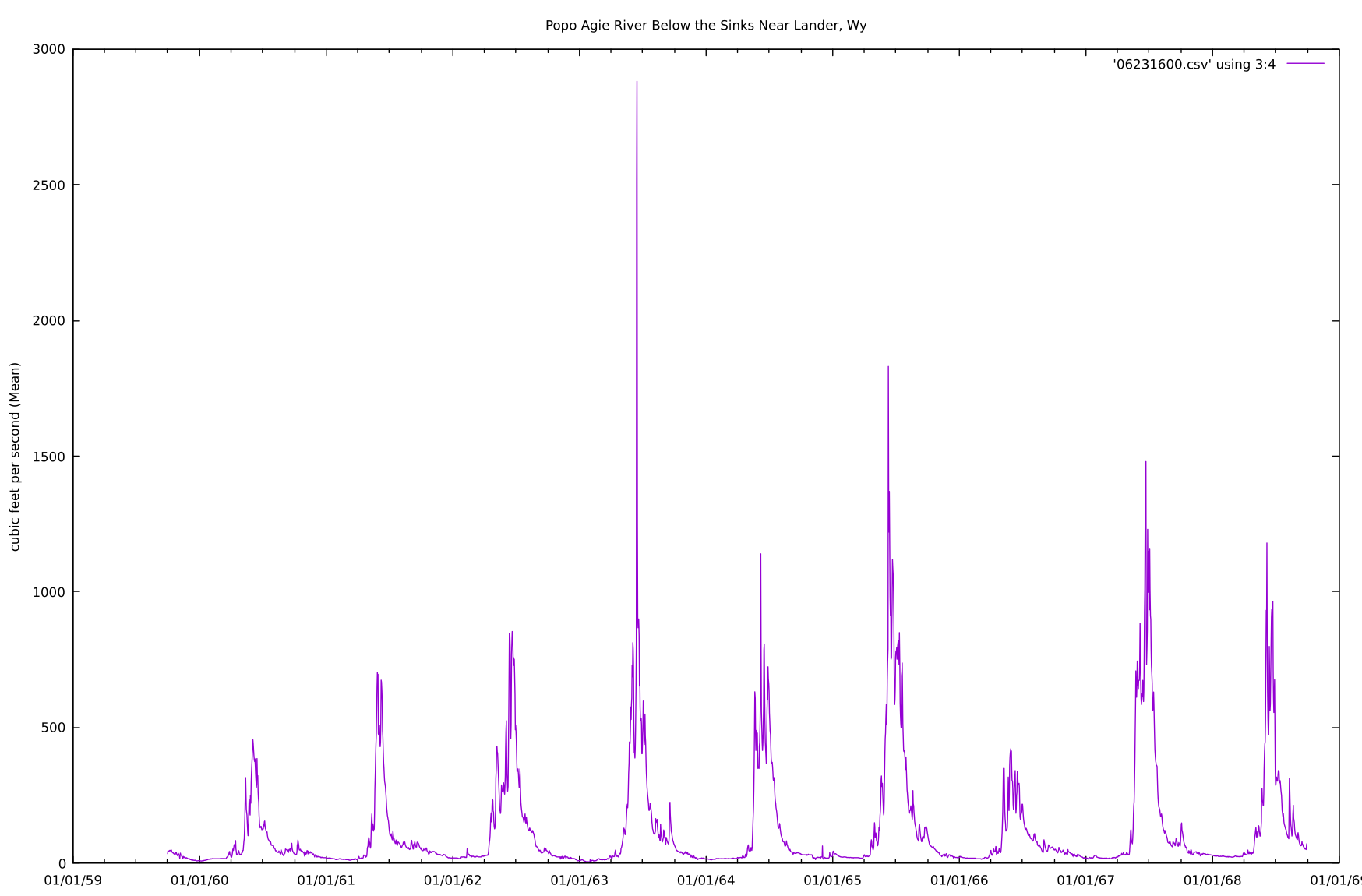
1959-1968 cubic feet per second of the Middle Popo Agie River below the Sinks near Lander, WY

The Middle Fork is fed from spring sources; seasonal precipitation and annual snow melt; irrigation return flows; several tributaries including the Sawmill, Hornecker, and Baldwin Creeks; and the North Popo Agie River. A significant tributary comes from Roaring Fork Creek downstream of Worthen Meadow Reservoir. The river's head is near Sweetwater Gap in the southern Wind River Range and it flows through the mountains, reaching Sinks Canyon and eventually Lander before joining the North Popo Agie River to form the Popo Agie River, or Big Popo Agie River. The river then joins the Little Popo Agie River before its confluence at the Little Wind River.

== History ==
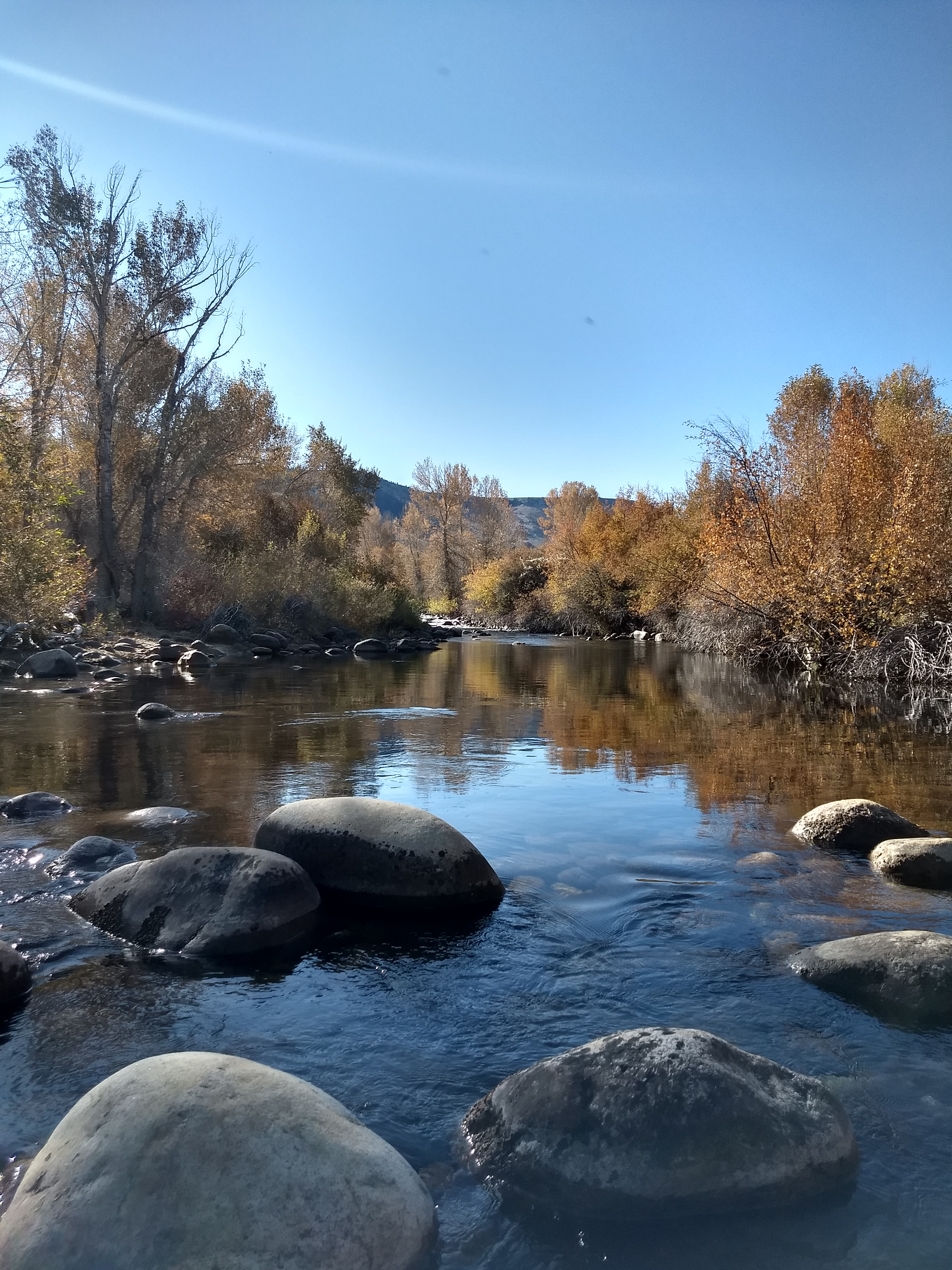
The Middle Popo Agie near Sinks Canyon in fall

The river has likely been known to native peoples for thousands of years. One of the first written accounts comes from Benjamin Bonneville around 1833, when his expedition explored the Wind River region. Bonneville describes finding a tar spring "at the foot of a sandbluff, a little to the east of the Wind River Mountains," while Osborne Russell describes it as an oil spring.

The word "popo" in the Crow language means "head", and "agie" means "river". However, the name has also been translated as "Gurgling River". The name Popo Agie is pronounced "puh - po shuh".

The Crow Tribe's Apsalooke Place Names Database at Little Bighorn College, which was created by Crow linguists and historians, records the name of the river as "Poppootcháashe", an onomatopoeia meaning "plopping river" which describes the sound the river makes when it passes into the sinkhole in Sinks Canyon.

Areas along the river were more extensively explored and documented during the Jones Expedition of 1873. The expedition's report describes geology along the river, with detailed documentation of everything from Native American petroglyphs to early white settlements. The report describes the area near the river as having rich soil with good potential for irrigation and a mild climate.

=== Modern history ===
The river's flow and surrounding geological makeup have been studied for decades. By the early 20th century, numerous minerals and other potential resources had been identified to possibly be developed. Everything from limestone and marble mining to hydroelectric power potential had been studied along the river.

=== Pollution ===
In April 2019, the Wyoming Department of Environmental Quality filed a notice of violation with Maverick Inc due to a gasoline leak on the river. The department conducted tests and reviewed documents after it received reports of gasoline leaking into the river near a Maverick gas station on Main Street in Lander. The department concluded the leak was from an overfilled underground gasoline storage tank.

== Popular culture ==
The Sinks of the Popo Agie figure into the climax of James Galvin's 2000 novel Fencing the Sky.

== See also ==
- List of rivers of Wyoming
