= Fremont County School District Number 6 =

School district in Wyoming, United States

Fremont County School District #6 is a public school district based in Pavillion, Wyoming, United States.

== Geography ==
Fremont County School District #6 serves northwestern and north central Fremont County, including the following communities:

- Incorporated places
  - Town of Pavillion
- Census-designated places (Note: All census-designated places are unincorporated.)
  - Crowheart
  - Johnstown (partial)
- Unincorporated places
  - Kinnear
  - Morton

== Schools ==
- Wind River Middle/High School (Grades 6–12)
- Crowheart Elementary School (Grades K-3)
- Wind River Elementary School (Grades K-5)

== Student demographics ==
The following figures are as of October 1, 2009.

- Total District Enrollment: 396
- Student enrollment by gender
  - Male: 201 (50.76%)
  - Female: 195 (49.24%)
- Student enrollment by ethnicity
  - American Indian or Alaska Native: 79 (19.95%)
  - Hispanic or Latino: 11 (2.78%)
  - Native Hawaiian or Other Pacific Islander: 4 (1.01%)
  - Two or More Races: 22 (5.56%)
  - White: 280 (70.71%)

== See also ==
- List of school districts in Wyoming
