= Roaring Fork Creek =

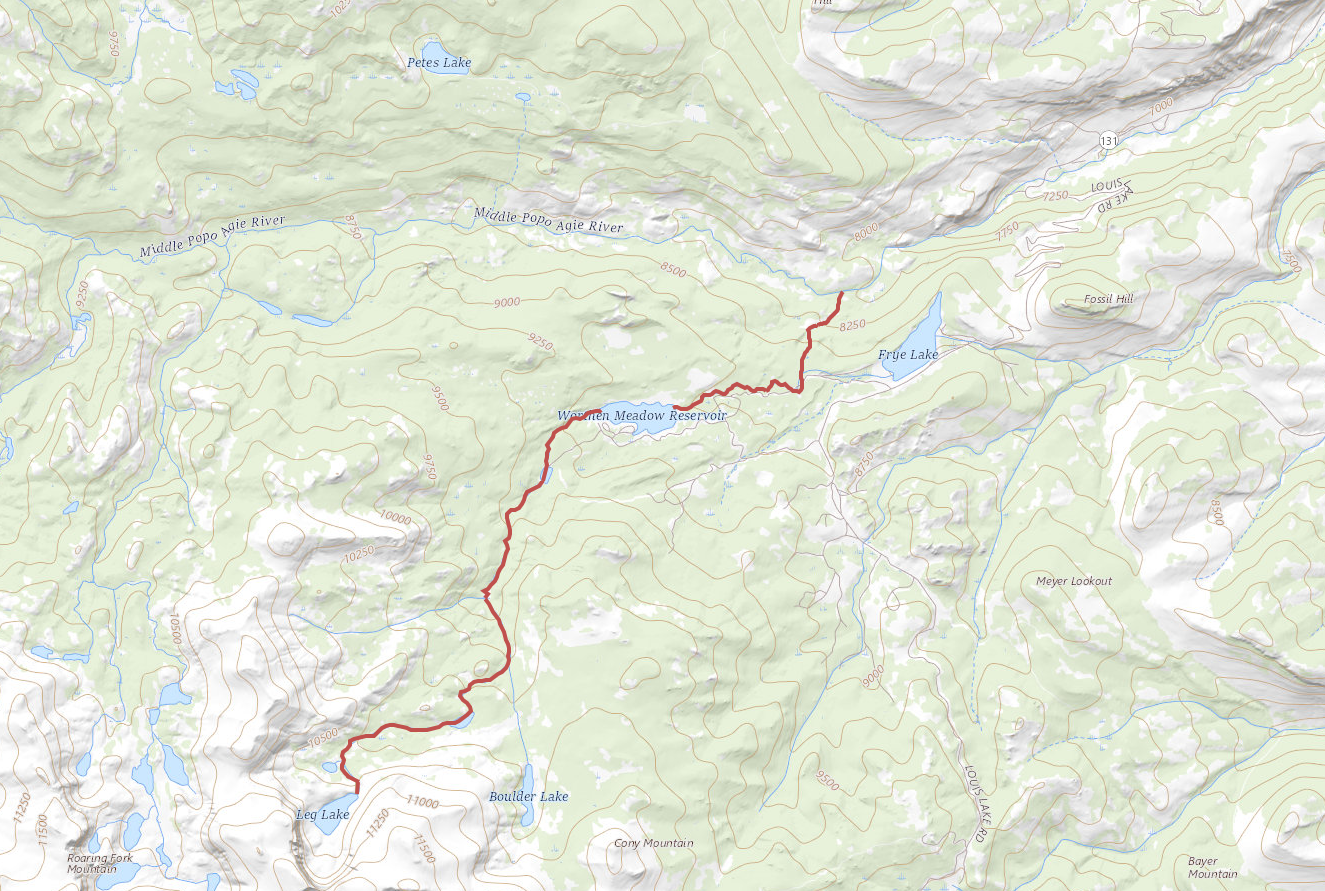
- The Flow of the Roaring Fork Creek from source to confluence.

Location
- Country: United States
- State: Wyoming
- County: Fremont County, Wyoming

Physical characteristics
- Source: Leg Lake
  - location: Wind River Range, Fremont County
  - elevation: 10,600 ft (3,200 m)
- Mouth: Middle Fork Popo Agie River
  - coordinates: 42°42′59″N 108°53′15″W
  - elevation: 8,250 ft (2,510 m)
- Length: 15 mi (24 km)

Roaring Fork Creek is a creek in Wyoming in the United States. The creek is 15 miles (24 km) long and flows through the Wind River Range. The creek feeds several lakes and reservoirs and is a source of water for Lander, Wyoming.

== Course ==
The creek's headwaters are at Leg Lake in the Wind River Range near Roaring Fork Mountain. The creek flows easterly and eventually empties into Roaring Fork Lake. The creek then continues for a short time until it reaches Worthen Meadows Reservoir. It then flows east until its end at the Middle Fork Popo Agie River.

== See also ==
- List of rivers of Wyoming
