= Wyoming Highway 139 =

State highway in Wyoming, United States

Wyoming Highway 139
- Sand Draw Road
- WYO 139 highlighted in red

Route information
- Maintained by WYDOT
- Length: 1.45 mi (2.33 km)

Major junctions
- West end: WYO 135
- East end: local roads in Sand Draw

Location
- Country: United States
- State: Wyoming
- Counties: Fremont

Highway system
- Wyoming State Highway System; Interstate; US; State
← WYO 138	→ WYO 150

Wyoming Highway 139 (WYO 139) is a short 1.45-mile-long (2.33 km) spur route of Wyoming Highway 135 in south-central Fremont County.

== Route description ==
Wyoming Highway 139 begins at Wyoming Highway 135 and travels into the small oil community of Sand Draw. Highway 139 ends at an unmarked 3-way intersection in Sand Draw 1.45 miles later.

== Major intersections ==
The entire route is in Sand Draw, Fremont County.

mi	km	Destinations	Notes
0.00	0.00	WYO 135	Western terminus of Route 139
1.45	2.33	local roads	Eastern terminus of WYO 139
1.000 mi = 1.609 km; 1.000 km = 0.621 mi
