= Fremont County School District Number 38 =

School district in Wyoming, United States

Address
- 445 Little Wind River Bottom Road Arapahoe, Wyoming, 82510; United States

District information
- Type: Public
- Grades: PreK–12
- NCES District ID: 5600960

Students and staff
- Students: 442
- Teachers: 42.17 (FTE)
- Staff: 83.82 (FTE)
- Student–teacher ratio: 10.48

Other information
- Website: www.arapahoeschools.com

Fremont County School District #38 is a public school district based in Arapahoe, Wyoming, United States.

== Geography ==
Fremont County School District #38 is located in central Fremont County and serves the following communities:

- Census-designated places (Note: All census-designated places are unincorporated.)
  - Arapahoe (most)
  - Johnstown (part)
- Unincorporated places
  - St Stephens

== Schools ==
- Arapaho Charter High School (Grades 9–12)
- Arapahoe School (Grades PK-8)

== Student demographics ==
The following figures are as of October 1, 2009.

- Total District Enrollment: 320
- Student enrollment by gender
  - Male: 178 (55.63%)
  - Female: 142 (44.38%)
- Student enrollment by ethnicity
  - American Indian or Alaska Native: 313 (97.81%)
  - Two or More Races: 3 (0.94%)
  - White: 4 (1.25%)

== See also ==
- List of school districts in Wyoming
