= Wyoming Highway 135 =

State highway in Wyoming, United States

Wyoming Highway 135
- Sand Draw Road
- WYO 135 highlighted in red

Route information
- Maintained by WYDOT
- Length: 35.62 mi (57.32 km)

Major junctions
- South end: US 287 / WYO 789 at Sweetwater Station
- North end: WYO 789 south of Riverton

Location
- Country: United States
- State: Wyoming
- Counties: Fremont

Highway system
- Wyoming State Highway System; Interstate; US; State
| ← WYO 134 | → WYO 136 |

Wyoming Highway 135 (WYO 135) is a 35.62-mile-long (57.32 km) north–south Wyoming State Road in Fremont County.

== Route description ==
Wyoming Highway 135 begins its southern end at US Route 287/Wyoming Highway 789 at Sweetwater Station northwest of Jeffrey City. Highway 135, named Sand Draw Road, travels north from Sweetwater Station towards the small oil community of Sand Draw. At 17 miles, approximately half-way through its route, Wyoming Highway 139 is intersected which acts as a spur into the community of Sand Draw. Past Sand Draw, WYO 135 heads now more north-northwest toward Riverton as it passes through the Wind River Basin. Nearing 34.5 miles, the western terminus of Wyoming Highway 136 (Gas Hills Road) is intersected which travels east towards the Gas Hills Mining District. Just after meeting WYO 136, Highway 135 crosses the Little Wind River and reaches its northern terminus at Wyoming Highway 789 just south of Riverton.

Wyoming Highway 135 provides an alternate to Wyoming Highway 789 through Lander.

== Major intersections ==
The entire route is in Fremont County.

| Location | mi | km | Destinations | Notes |
|---|---|---|---|---|
| | 0.00 | 0.00 | US 287 / WYO 789 | |
| | 17.00 | 27.36 | WYO 139 | Western terminus of Route 139 |
| | 34.58 | 55.65 | WYO 136 | Western terminus of Route 136 |
| Arapahoe | 35.62 | 57.32 | WYO 789 | |
1.000 mi = 1.609 km; 1.000 km = 0.621 mi
