= Little Popo Agie River =

River in Fremont County, Wyoming, United States

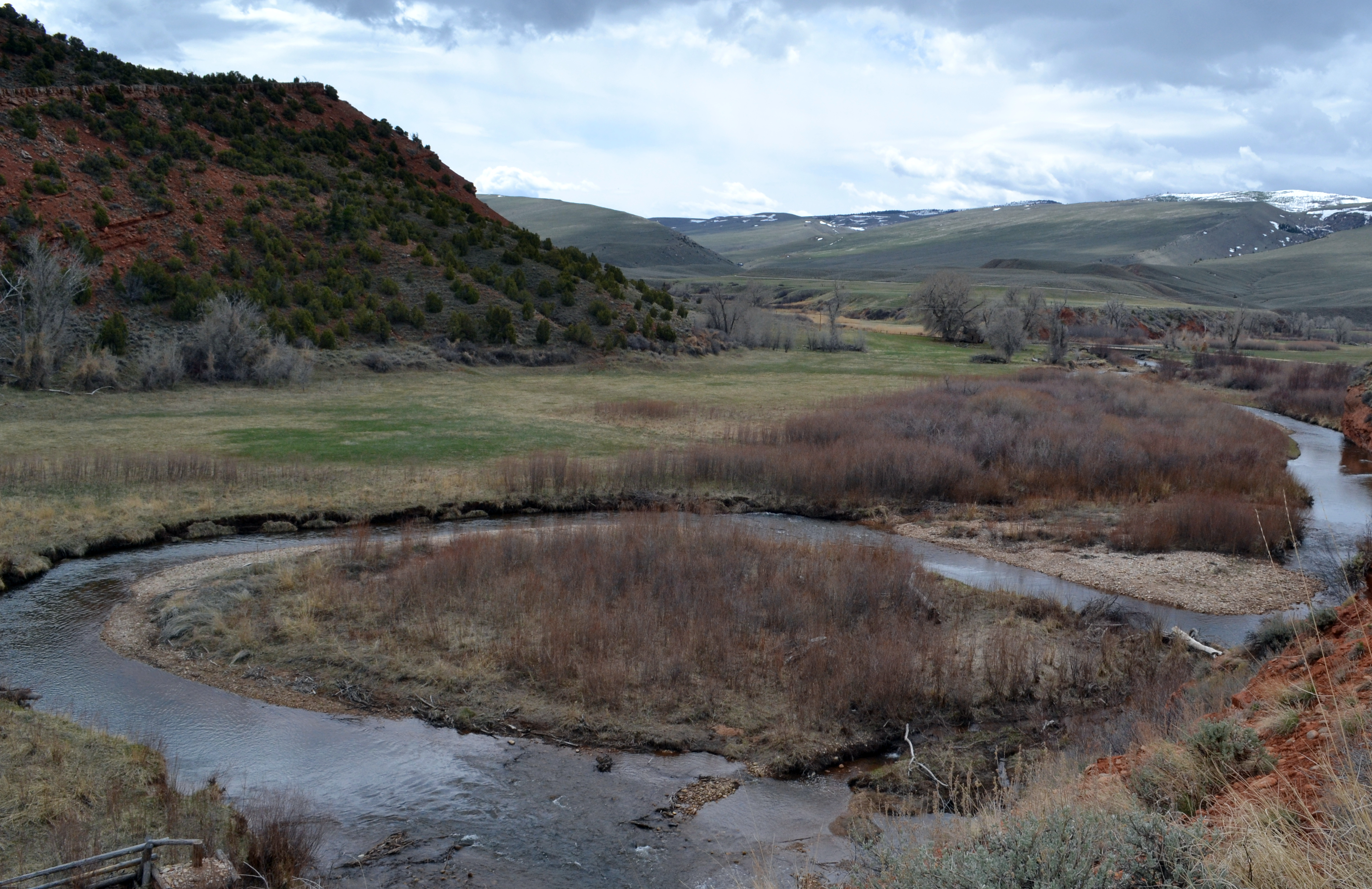
- The Little Popo Agie River near Red Canyon

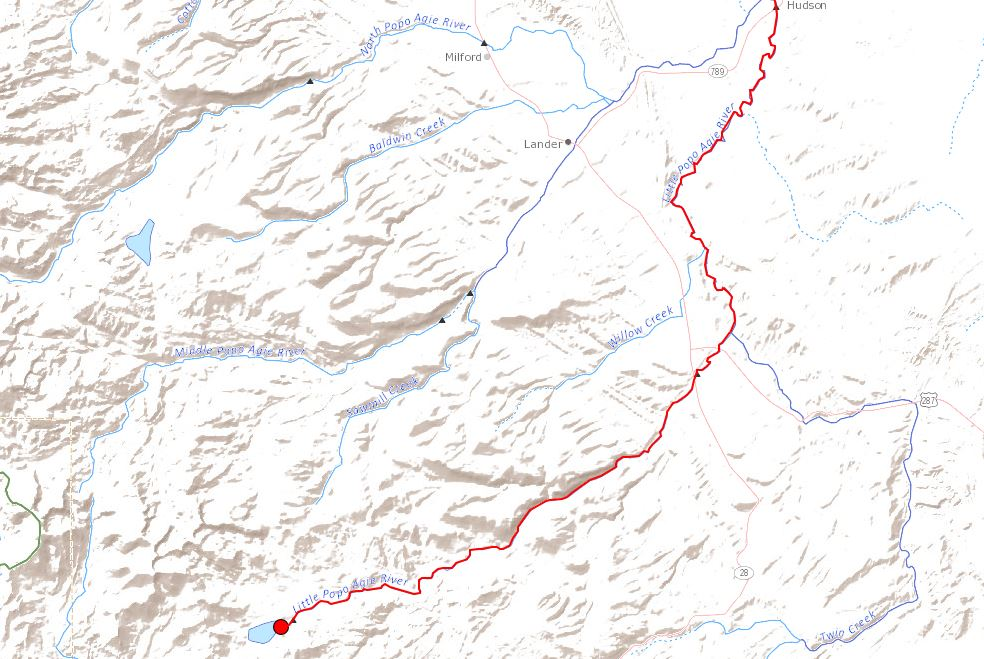
- The course of the Little Popo Agie River
- Etymology: word po-PO-shuh, meaning "Head River" or possibly "Gurgling River"

Location
- Country: United States
- State: Wyoming

Physical characteristics
- Source: Christina Lake
  - location: Wind River Range, Fremont County
  - elevation: 10,000 ft (3,000 m)
- Mouth: North Fork Popo Agie River
  - location: Hudson, Wyoming
  - coordinates: 42°54′16″N 108°35′21″W
  - elevation: 5,000 ft (1,500 m)
- Length: 58 mi (93 km)

Basin features
- Tributaries
  - left: Beason Creek, Willow Creek
  - right: Twin Creek, Red Canyon Creek

The Little Popo Agie River runs through unincorporated portions of Fremont County, Wyoming, United States. Its headwaters are at Christina Lake in the Wind River Range, and it flows a total of 58 miles (93 km) until its end near Hudson, Wyoming. The river is one of three sharing the name "Popo Agie", along with the Middle Fork Popo Agie and the North Fork Popo Agie River.

== Course ==
The river's head is about 10,000 feet (3,050 m) above sea level, and its end is at around 5,000 feet (1,520 m) above sea level.

== History ==
During the 19th century, areas along the river were the site of violent encounters between the U.S. Army and Native Americans. On July 1, 1875, a cavalry detachment documented killing two Native Americans near the river.

== Pollution ==
Since at least the early 20th century, some sections of the river have had problems with pollution thought to have come from industrial operations at nearby oil extraction sites. Around 1907, sufficient oil waste was reportedly being dumped into the Little Popo Agie River. This led to several lawsuits being filed for damages by locals using the river's water for irrigation against oil companies operating in the area. Pollution from oil waste was linked to decreased fish habitat on the river in the 1950s.

== See also ==
- List of rivers in Wyoming

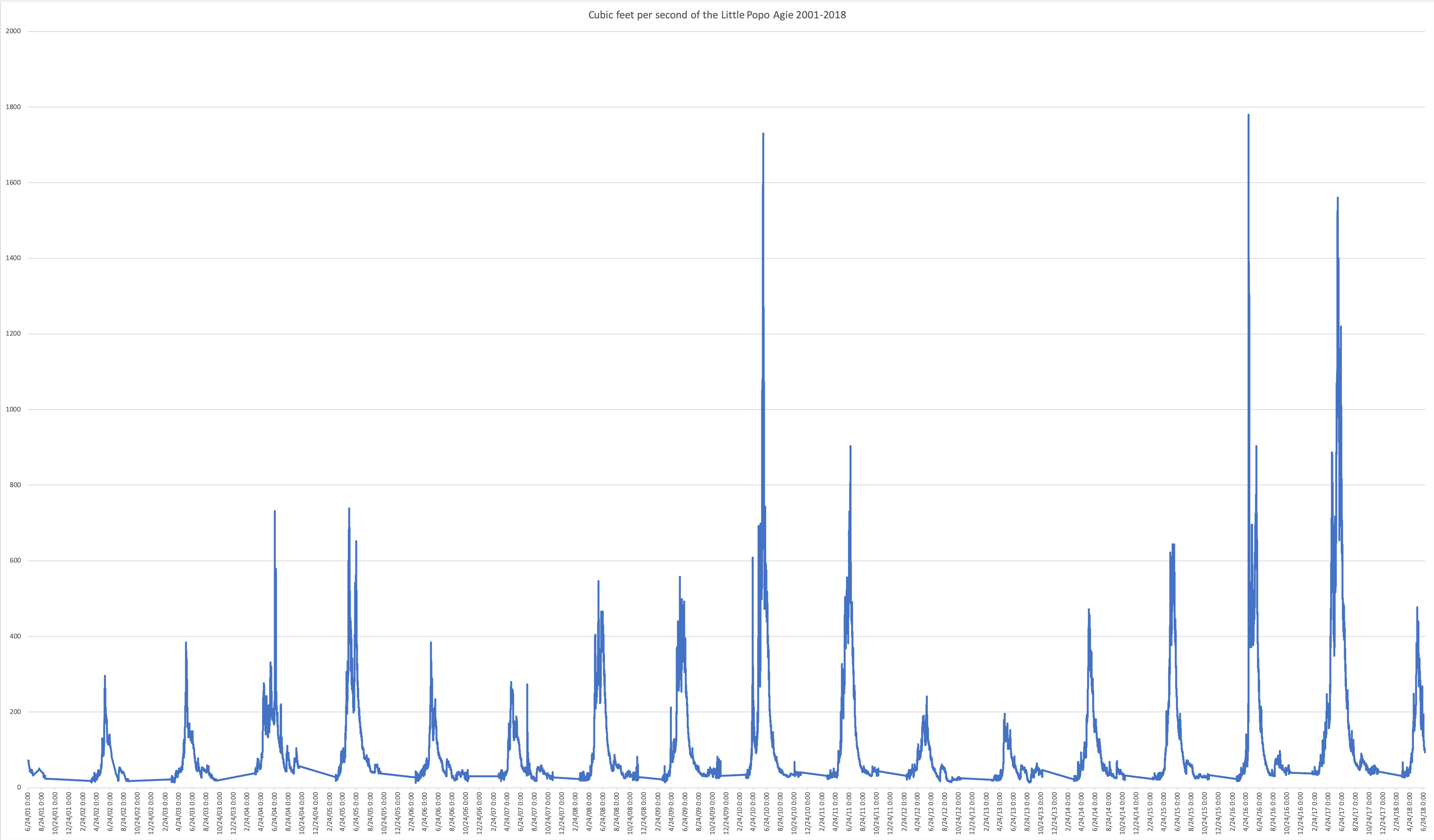
Cubic feet per second flow of the Little Popo Agie River near Dickinson Avenue bridge from 2001 to 2018
