= School District 38 =

School District 38 can refer to:

Canada

- Richmond School District or District #38 (British Columbia)

United States

- Big Hollow School District 38 (Illinois)
- Bigfork School District 38 (Montana)
- Fremont County School District 38 (Wyoming)
- Lewis Palmer School District 38 (Colorado)
- Kenilworth District No. 38 (Illinois)
