= Wyoming Highway 131 =

Highway in Wyoming

Wyoming Highway 131
- Sinks Canyon Road
- WYO 131 highlighted in red

Route information
- Maintained by WYDOT, City of Lander
- Length: 9.00 mi (14.48 km)

Major junctions
- South end: Sinks Canyon Road in Sinks Canyon State Park
- North end: US 287 in Lander

Location
- Country: United States
- State: Wyoming
- Counties: Fremont

Highway system
- Wyoming State Highway System; Interstate; US; State
← WYO 130	→ WYO 132

Wyoming Highway 131 (WYO 131) is a 9-mile-long (14 km) north–south Wyoming State Road in Fremont County that travels from U.S. Route 287 (US 287) in Lander, south to Sinks Canyon State Park.

== Route description ==
Wyoming Highway 131 begins its southern end at the northern boundary of the Shoshone National Forest at Sinks Canyon State Park, hence its name Sinks Canyon Road. WYO 131 travels northeast to Lander, entering from the southwest. Upon entering, WYO 131 turns east and becomes Fremont Street before turning north onto South 5th Street. According to the WYDOT 1997 route log, the last 1.68 miles of Highway 131 are maintained by the City of Lander rather than WYDOT. WYO 131 meets its north end when it reaches U.S. Route 287 (Main Street) in Lander. This road was first paved in 1959.

== Major intersections ==
The entire route is in Fremont County.

Location	mi	km	Destinations	Notes
Sinks Canyon State Park	0.00	0.00	Sinks Canyon Road	Southern terminus of Route 131
Lander	9.00	14.48	US 287	Northern terminus of Route 131
1.000 mi = 1.609 km; 1.000 km = 0.621 mi
