= Wyoming Highway 136 =

State highway in Wyoming, United States

Wyoming Highway 136
- Gas Hills Road
- WYO 136 highlighted in red

Route information
- Maintained by WYDOT
- Length: 42.70 mi (68.72 km)

Major junctions
- West end: WYO 135 south of Riverton
- East end: CR 5 in the Gas Hills Mining District

Location
- Country: United States
- State: Wyoming
- Counties: Fremont

Highway system
- Wyoming State Highway System; Interstate; US; State
← WYO 135	→ WYO 137

Wyoming Highway 136 (WYO 136) is a 42.70-mile-long (68.72 km) long east–west Wyoming State Road in Fremont County.

== Route description ==
Wyoming Highway 136, named Gas Hills Road, begins at Wyoming Highway 135 south of Riverton. From there, Highway 136 travels east, crosses into the Wind River Indian Reservation and on into the Gas Hills Uranium Mining District. WYO 136 reaches its eastern end at a T-intersection with Fremont CR 5 (Dry Creek Road). Highway 136 provides access to Castle Gardens Prehistoric Site where hundreds of prehistoric carvings can be viewed on the sandstone rock.

== Major intersections ==
The entire route is in Fremont County.

Location	mi	km	Destinations	Notes
	0.00	0.00	WYO 135	
	42.70	68.72	CR 5 (Dry Creek Road)	
1.000 mi = 1.609 km; 1.000 km = 0.621 mi
