= St. Stephens Indian School =

Native American School

Coordinates: 42.9845°N 108.4225°W

Information
- Established: 1884; 142 years ago
- Grades: K-12
- Affiliation: Bureau of Indian Education

St. Stephens Indian School is a tribal K-12 school in St. Stephens, a settlement in Arapahoe, Wyoming. The school is affiliated with the Bureau of Indian Education (BIE).

A priest in a Jesuit order of the Catholic church established the school in 1884.

In 1985 there was a proposal to merge the school, then the St. Stephens Indian High School, with the Arapahoe School.

In 2015 the school created a documentary, "Listening For A New Day: the making of an Arapaho buffalo hide tipi," about its students creating tipis the traditional way. The documentary won the Red Nation Film Festival Oyate award.
