= North Popo Agie River =

River in Fremont County, Wyoming, United States

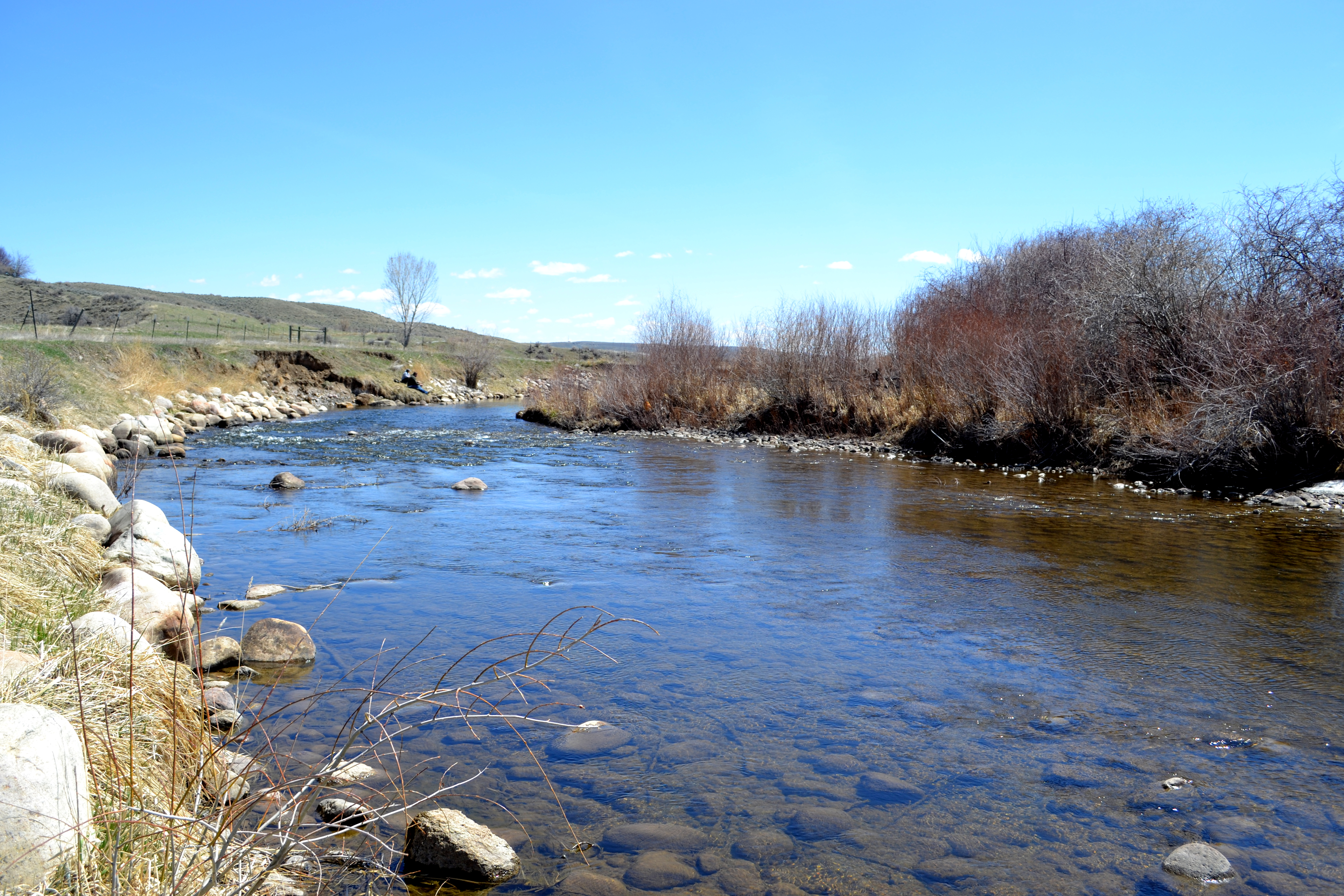
- The North Fork Popo Agie River looking east near Lander, Wyoming in April 2020

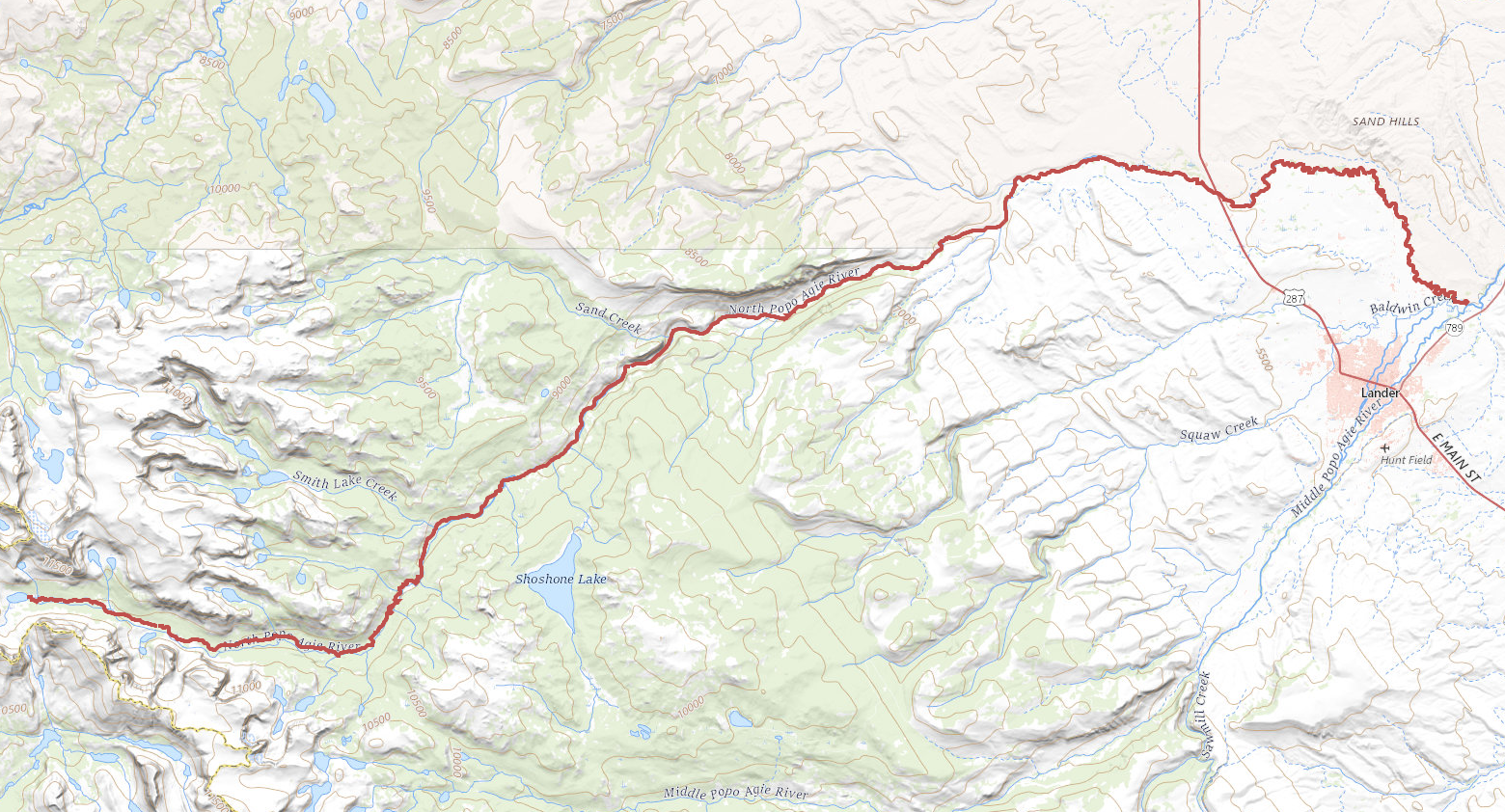
- The course of the North Popo Agie River
- Etymology: word po-PO-shuh, meaning "Head River" or possibly "Gurgling River"

Location
- Country: United States
- State: Wyoming

Physical characteristics
- Source: Lonesome Lake
  - location: Wind River Range, Fremont County
  - elevation: 10,200 ft (3,100 m)
- Mouth
  - location: near Lander, Wyoming
  - coordinates: 42°51′15″N 108°41′59″W
  - elevation: 5,000 ft (1,500 m)
- Length: 43 mi (69 km)

Basin features
- Tributaries
  - left: Surrell Creek
  - right: Shoshone Lake, Paradise Creek, Mexican Creek

The North Popo Agie River (also known as the North Fork Popo Agie River) is a river in Fremont County, Wyoming, United States, that serves as part of the boundary of the Wind River Indian Reservation. Its headwaters are at Lonesome Lake in the Wind River Range, and it flows eastward until its end near Lander when it joins the Middle Popo Agie River to form the Popo Agie River.

== Fishing ==
The river is considered a Class 2 fishery by the Wyoming Game and Fish Department, meaning it has very good trout waters of statewide importance. Species found here include rainbow trout, brook trout, cutthroat trout and mountain whitefish.

== See also ==
- List of rivers in Wyoming
