= Worthen Meadow Reservoir =

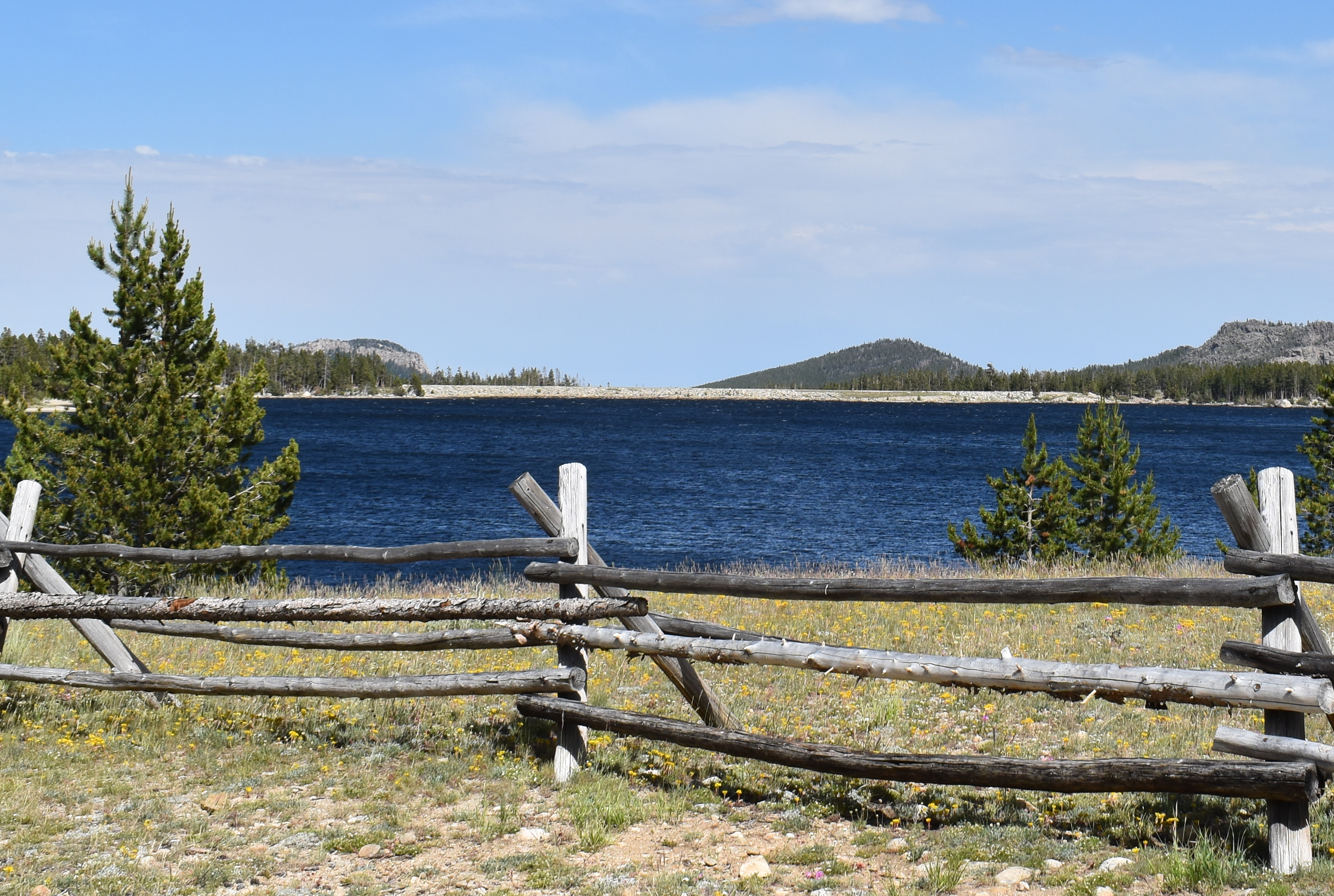

- Location within Wyoming Location within the United States
- Location: Fremont County, Wyoming
- Coordinates: 42°42′00″N 108°55′20″W
- Type: reservoir
- Primary inflows: Roaring Fork Creek
- Primary outflows: Enterprise Ditch
- Basin countries: United States
- Water volume: 1,500 acre-feet (1,900,000 m^{3})
- Surface elevation: 8,819 ft (2,688 m)
- Islands: 0

Worthen Meadow Reservoir is a reservoir located in the Shoshone National Forest. The reservoir is fed by Roaring Fork Creek, and it holds around 1,500 acre feet of water with a surface elevation of 8,819 ft (2,688 m) (crest of the service spillway). The reservoir's two section earth-fill dam was constructed in 1958, and the reservoir acts as a supplemental supply of water for the City of Lander, Wyoming. The total length of the dam is 917 ft (280 m) with a maximum height of 43 ft (13 m) above the stream bed of Roaring Fork Creek.

== Recreation ==
Numerous trails and campsites are located near the reservoir including Worthen Meadow Campground and trail-heads leading into the Wind River Range.

== Wildlife ==
The reservoir contains different species of fish including rainbow trout, brook trout and arctic grayling.

== Safety Concerns ==
The reservoir's upstream location 17 mi (27 km) from Lander creates a significant hazard to the city in the event of dam failure. However, the dam has been reinforced and maintained to avoid failure.

== Climate ==
Townsend Creek is a SNOTEL weather station located roughly halfway between Worthen Meadow Reservoir and Frye Lake at an altitude of 8700 feet (2652 m). Townsend Creek has a subalpine climate (Köppen Dfc), with long, cold winters and short, mild summers.

Climate data for Townsend Creek, Wyoming, 1991–2020 normals, 2010-2020 snowfall: 8700ft (2652m)
Month	Jan	Feb	Mar	Apr	May	Jun	Jul	Aug	Sep	Oct	Nov	Dec	Year
Record high °F (°C)	59 (15)	57 (14)	62 (17)	70 (21)	80 (27)	84 (29)	91 (33)	88 (31)	83 (28)	72 (22)	64 (18)	53 (12)	91 (33)
Mean maximum °F (°C)	49.9 (9.9)	49.3 (9.6)	55.8 (13.2)	61.7 (16.5)	69.6 (20.9)	77.6 (25.3)	82.8 (28.2)	81.4 (27.4)	76.1 (24.5)	66.2 (19.0)	54.6 (12.6)	47.2 (8.4)	83.5 (28.6)
Mean daily maximum °F (°C)	34.1 (1.2)	34.7 (1.5)	41.5 (5.3)	46.1 (7.8)	54.4 (12.4)	65.0 (18.3)	73.9 (23.3)	72.1 (22.3)	62.3 (16.8)	49.5 (9.7)	39.0 (3.9)	32.0 (0.0)	50.4 (10.2)
Daily mean °F (°C)	20.2 (−6.6)	20.2 (−6.6)	27.2 (−2.7)	32.9 (0.5)	41.5 (5.3)	50.1 (10.1)	57.4 (14.1)	56.0 (13.3)	47.7 (8.7)	36.7 (2.6)	26.2 (−3.2)	19.1 (−7.2)	36.3 (2.4)
Mean daily minimum °F (°C)	6.3 (−14.3)	5.6 (−14.7)	12.7 (−10.7)	19.5 (−6.9)	28.4 (−2.0)	35.1 (1.7)	40.9 (4.9)	39.9 (4.4)	33.0 (0.6)	23.8 (−4.6)	13.4 (−10.3)	6.2 (−14.3)	22.1 (−5.5)
Mean minimum °F (°C)	−17.0 (−27.2)	−18.2 (−27.9)	−11.2 (−24.0)	−0.6 (−18.1)	12.6 (−10.8)	25.9 (−3.4)	32.2 (0.1)	29.9 (−1.2)	19.8 (−6.8)	3.1 (−16.1)	−11.6 (−24.2)	−18.5 (−28.1)	−24.7 (−31.5)
Record low °F (°C)	−29 (−34)	−32 (−36)	−27 (−33)	−15 (−26)	−2 (−19)	19 (−7)	23 (−5)	20 (−7)	3 (−16)	−16 (−27)	−26 (−32)	−40 (−40)	−40 (−40)
Average precipitation inches (mm)	1.25 (32)	1.60 (41)	2.51 (64)	3.67 (93)	3.90 (99)	1.86 (47)	1.00 (25)	1.11 (28)	1.90 (48)	2.37 (60)	1.72 (44)	1.40 (36)	24.29 (617)
Average snowfall inches (cm)	11.1 (28)	18.3 (46)	17.4 (44)	24.4 (62)	12.9 (33)	0.0 (0.0)	0.0 (0.0)	0.0 (0.0)	2.0 (5.1)	7.3 (19)	11.1 (28)	14.0 (36)	118.5 (301.1)
Source 1: XMACIS2 (records, monthly max/mins & Lander 5.7SW snowfall)
Source 2: NOAA (Precipitation)
