= Kinnear, Wyoming =

Unincorporated community in Fremont County, Wyoming, United States

- Unincorporated community
- Location within the state of Wyoming Kinnear (the United States)
- Coordinates: 43°09′07″N 108°40′39″W
- Country: United States
- State: Wyoming
- County: Fremont
- Elevation: 5,400 ft (1,600 m)
- Time zone: UTC-7 (Mountain (MST))
  - Summer (DST): UTC-6 (MDT)
- ZIP codes: 82516
- GNIS feature ID: 1590366

Kinnear is an unincorporated community in central Fremont County, Wyoming, United States.

== Description ==
The community lies along U.S. Route 26 near its junction with Wyoming Highway 133, northwest of the city of Riverton and north of the city of Lander, the county seat of Fremont County. Its elevation is 5,400 feet (1,600 m). Kinnear has a post office, with the ZIP code of 82516.

Public education in the community of Kinnear is provided by Fremont County School District #6.
