= Johnstown, Wyoming =

Census-designated place in Fremont County, Wyoming, United States

- Census-designated place
- Location within the state of Wyoming
- Coordinates: 43°06′45″N 108°42′52″W
- Country: United States
- State: Wyoming
- County: Fremont

Area
  - Total: 32.1 sq mi (83.2 km^{2})
  - Land: 31.5 sq mi (81.5 km^{2})
  - Water: 0.69 sq mi (1.8 km^{2})
- Elevation: 5,259 ft (1,603 m)

Population (2010)
  - Total: 242
  - Density: 7.69/sq mi (2.97/km^{2})
- Time zone: UTC-7 (Mountain (MST))
  - Summer (DST): UTC-6 (MDT)
- Zipcode: 82516
- Area code: 307
- FIPS code: 56-40945
- GNIS feature ID: 2408449

Johnstown is a census-designated place (CDP) in Fremont County, Wyoming, United States. The population was 242 at the 2010 census.

== Geography ==
According to the United States Census Bureau, the CDP has a total area of 32.1 square miles (83.2 km^{2}), of which 31.5 square miles (81.5 km^{2}) is land and 0.7 square mile (1.8 km^{2}) (2.12%) is water.

== Demographics ==
As of the census of 2000, there were 236 people, 83 households, and 60 families residing in the CDP. The population density was 7.5 people per square mile (2.9/km^{2}). There were 100 housing units at an average density of 3.2/sq mi (1.2/km^{2}). The racial makeup of the CDP was 43.64% White, 53.39% Native American, and 2.97% from two or more races. Hispanic or Latino of any race were 8.05% of the population.

There were 83 households, out of which 28.9% had children under the age of 18 living with them, 56.6% were married couples living together, 12.0% had a female householder with no husband present, and 27.7% were non-families. 21.7% of all households were made up of individuals, and 4.8% had someone living alone who was 65 years of age or older. The average household size was 2.84 and the average family size was 3.28.

In the CDP, the population was spread out, with 31.4% under the age of 18, 6.8% from 18 to 24, 27.5% from 25 to 44, 25.0% from 45 to 64, and 9.3% who were 65 years of age or older. The median age was 33 years. For every 100 females, there were 100.0 males. For every 100 females age 18 and over, there were 107.7 males.

The median income for a household in the CDP was $27,500, and the median income for a family was $27,188. Males had a median income of $29,286 versus $18,000 for females. The per capita income for the CDP was $10,521. About 11.3% of families and 17.8% of the population were below the poverty line, including 22.8% of those under the age of eighteen and 11.1% of those 65 or over.

== Education ==
Three public school districts – Fremont County School District #6, Fremont County School District #21, and Fremont County School District #38 – each serve portions of Johnstown.

== See also ==
- List of census-designated places in Wyoming
