= St. Stephens, Wyoming =

- Unincorporated community
- Location within Wyoming Location within the United States
- Coordinates: 42°59′02″N 108°24′59″W
- Country: United States
- State: Wyoming
- County: Fremont
- Time zone: UTC-7 (Mountain (MST))
  - Summer (DST): UTC-6 (MDT)
- Area code: 307
- GNIS feature ID: 1609148

St. Stephens oe Saint Stephens is an unincorporated community in Fremont County, Wyoming, United States. It is home to the St. Stephens Indian Mission.

In Summer 2015, St. Stephens hosted an Arapaho language camp.

== Education ==
St. Stephens Indian School, a K-12 tribal school affiliated with the Bureau of Indian Education, is in St. Stephens.

== Notable person ==
- Constantine Scollen, the famous missionary, was a priest here amongst the Arapaho from 1890 to 1892.
