= Pavillion, Wyoming =

Town in Fremont County, Wyoming, United States

Pavillion, Wyoming Heecesei' Howoh'oowu' (Arapaho)
- Town
- Location of Pavillion in Fremont County, Wyoming
- Coordinates: 43°14′38″N 108°41′20″W
- Country: United States
- State: Wyoming
- County: Fremont

Area
  - Total: 0.20 sq mi (0.52 km^{2})
  - Land: 0.20 sq mi (0.52 km^{2})
  - Water: 0 sq mi (0.00 km^{2})
- Elevation: 5,463 ft (1,665 m)

Population (2020)
  - Total: 230
  - Density: 1,142.6/sq mi (441.16/km^{2})
- Time zone: UTC-7 (Mountain (MST))
  - Summer (DST): UTC-6 (MDT)
- ZIP code: 82523
- Area code: 307
- FIPS code: 56-60130
- GNIS feature ID: 2413119

Pavillion (Arapaho: Heecesei' Howoh'oowu') is a town in Fremont County, Wyoming, United States. As of the 2020 census, Pavillion had a population of 230.

== History ==
In 2008, rural residents five miles east-northeast of Pavillion complained of discolored water, foul smells and illness that they suspected was due to fracking, and the EPA opened an investigation. In 2010, the EPA investigators warned the affected rural residents not to drink their water after finding benzene, naphthalene, phenols, and metals in the water and recommended that the affected rural residents use fans while bathing or washing clothes to avoid the risk of explosion. As of September 2012 testing and discussion about the results was still ongoing. Eventually, in 2016, a study confirmed that chemicals used in fracking impact drinking water that is generated from wells. Pavillion was a subject in the 2010 documentary film Gasland, directed by Josh Fox.

It important to note that natural gas in the water has always been an issue in the area. Kids where lighting water on fire decades before the first well was ever drilled.

== Demographics ==
Historical population
Census	Pop.	Note	%±
1940	176		—
1950	241		36.9%
1960	190		−21.2%
1970	181		−4.7%
1980	287		58.6%
1990	126		−56.1%
2000	165		31.0%
2010	231		40.0%
2020	230		−0.4%
U.S. Decennial Census

=== 2020 census ===
As of the census of 2020, there were 230 people and 92 households in the town. The population density was 1,150.0 inhabitants per square mile (444.0/km^{2}). There were 110 housing units at an average density of 550 per square mile (212.4/km^{2}). The racial makeup of the town was 90.4% White, 1.3% Native American, 0.9% from other races, and 9.6% from two or more races. Hispanic or Latino of any race were 7.8% of the population.

There were 92 households, of which 20.7% had children under the age of 18 living with them, 49.5% were married couples living together, 20.7% had a female householder with no husband present, and 13% had a male householder with no wife present. 13% of all households were made up of individuals, and 10.9% had someone living alone who was 65 years of age or older. The average household size was 3.09 and the average family size was 3.58.

The median age in the town was 47.2 years. 28.3% of residents were under the age of 18; 67% were 21 years or older; and 19.6% were 65 years of age or older. The gender makeup of the town was 50% male and 50% female.

The median income for a household in the town was $50,000, and the median income for a family was $58,333. 18.9% of the population were below the poverty line, including 38% of those under the age of eighteen and 3.6% of those 65 or over. The employment rate was 43.9%.

38.6% of the population aged 25 and older held a high school diploma. 25.9% had some college but no degree, while 10.7% held an associate's degree, 13.7% held a bachelor's degree, and 3% held a graduate or professional degree.

=== 2010 census ===
As of the census of 2010, there were 231 people, 95 households, and 64 families residing in the town. The population density was 1,100.0 inhabitants per square mile (424.7/km^{2}). There were 108 housing units at an average density of 514.3 per square mile (198.6/km^{2}). The racial makeup of the town was 93.1% White, 3.0% Native American, 0.4% Asian, 0.4% from other races, and 3.0% from two or more races. Hispanic or Latino of any race were 5.6% of the population.

There were 95 households, of which 30.5% had children under the age of 18 living with them, 49.5% were married couples living together, 11.6% had a female householder with no husband present, 6.3% had a male householder with no wife present, and 32.6% were non-families. 29.5% of all households were made up of individuals, and 16.8% had someone living alone who was 65 years of age or older. The average household size was 2.43 and the average family size was 3.02.

The median age in the town was 42.3 years. 23.8% of residents were under the age of 18; 6.5% were between the ages of 18 and 24; 23% were from 25 to 44; 28.2% were from 45 to 64; and 18.6% were 65 years of age or older. The gender makeup of the town was 48.9% male and 51.1% female.

=== 2000 census ===
As of the census of 2000, there were 165 people, 77 households, and 50 families residing in the town. The population density was 861.2 people per square mile (335.3/km^{2}). There were 89 housing units at an average density of 464.5 per square mile (180.9/km^{2}). The racial makeup of the town was 93.94% White, 1.82% Native American, 0.61% from other races, and 3.64% from two or more races. Hispanic or Latino of any race were 2.42% of the population.

There were 77 households, out of which 23.4% had children under the age of 18 living with them, 54.5% were married couples living together, 9.1% had a female householder with no husband present, and 33.8% were non-families. 31.2% of all households were made up of individuals, and 15.6% had someone living alone who was 65 years of age or older. The average household size was 2.14 and the average family size was 2.69.

In the town, the population was spread out, with 21.8% under the age of 18, 9.1% from 18 to 24, 20.6% from 25 to 44, 32.7% from 45 to 64, and 15.8% who were 65 years of age or older. The median age was 44 years. For every 100 females, there were 96.4 males. For every 100 females age 18 and over, there were 84.3 males.

The median income for a household in the town was $33,125, and the median income for a family was $41,250. Males had a median income of $30,833 versus $19,167 for females. The per capita income for the town was $17,790. About 3.3% of families and 3.5% of the population were below the poverty line, including none of those under the age of eighteen and 7.1% of those 65 or over.

== Geography ==
According to the United States Census Bureau, the town has a total area of 0.21 square miles (0.54 km^{2}), all land.

=== Climate ===
According to the Köppen Climate Classification system, Pavillion has a cold semi-arid climate, abbreviated "BSk" on climate maps. The hottest temperature recorded in Pavillion was 102 °F (39 °C) on June 29, 1919, while the coldest temperature recorded was −42 °F (−41 °C) on December 19, 1924.

Climate data for Pavillion, Wyoming, 1991–2020 normals, extremes 1919–present
Month	Jan	Feb	Mar	Apr	May	Jun	Jul	Aug	Sep	Oct	Nov	Dec	Year
Record high °F (°C)	63 (17)	70 (21)	76 (24)	84 (29)	96 (36)	102 (39)	101 (38)	100 (38)	97 (36)	84 (29)	72 (22)	65 (18)	102 (39)
Mean maximum °F (°C)	51.1 (10.6)	54.7 (12.6)	65.4 (18.6)	74.7 (23.7)	82.3 (27.9)	89.9 (32.2)	94.1 (34.5)	92.2 (33.4)	87.0 (30.6)	75.9 (24.4)	61.1 (16.2)	52.5 (11.4)	94.7 (34.8)
Mean daily maximum °F (°C)	33.5 (0.8)	37.8 (3.2)	50.2 (10.1)	57.9 (14.4)	67.0 (19.4)	77.6 (25.3)	85.8 (29.9)	83.2 (28.4)	73.7 (23.2)	59.0 (15.0)	43.8 (6.6)	32.6 (0.3)	58.5 (14.7)
Daily mean °F (°C)	21.7 (−5.7)	25.6 (−3.6)	36.8 (2.7)	44.4 (6.9)	53.5 (11.9)	62.4 (16.9)	70.3 (21.3)	68.1 (20.1)	58.8 (14.9)	45.5 (7.5)	31.4 (−0.3)	21.0 (−6.1)	45.0 (7.2)
Mean daily minimum °F (°C)	9.9 (−12.3)	13.5 (−10.3)	23.4 (−4.8)	30.8 (−0.7)	40.0 (4.4)	47.7 (8.7)	54.7 (12.6)	52.9 (11.6)	44.0 (6.7)	32.0 (0.0)	19.1 (−7.2)	9.4 (−12.6)	31.5 (−0.3)
Mean minimum °F (°C)	−11.0 (−23.9)	−6.3 (−21.3)	−5.9 (−21.1)	17.1 (−8.3)	26.3 (−3.2)	36.4 (2.4)	46.2 (7.9)	42.9 (6.1)	31.4 (−0.3)	15.8 (−9.0)	0.2 (−17.7)	−10.5 (−23.6)	−16.7 (−27.1)
Record low °F (°C)	−38 (−39)	−39 (−39)	−20 (−29)	−13 (−25)	17 (−8)	25 (−4)	35 (2)	34 (1)	15 (−9)	−10 (−23)	−22 (−30)	−42 (−41)	−42 (−41)
Average precipitation inches (mm)	0.27 (6.9)	0.28 (7.1)	0.43 (11)	1.07 (27)	2.09 (53)	1.14 (29)	0.73 (19)	0.56 (14)	0.87 (22)	0.74 (19)	0.35 (8.9)	0.28 (7.1)	8.81 (224)
Average snowfall inches (cm)	4.1 (10)	4.7 (12)	3.6 (9.1)	4.9 (12)	0.4 (1.0)	0.2 (0.51)	0.0 (0.0)	0.0 (0.0)	0.3 (0.76)	1.9 (4.8)	3.4 (8.6)	4.9 (12)	28.4 (70.77)
Average precipitation days (≥ 0.01 in)	2.0	1.9	2.4	4.3	5.8	3.9	3.2	3.4	3.1	2.8	2.1	2.4	37.3
Average snowy days (≥ 0.1 in)	1.8	1.8	1.7	1.3	0.3	0.0	0.0	0.0	0.1	0.6	1.6	2.0	11.2
Source 1: NOAA
Source 2: National Weather Service

== Education ==
Public education in the town of Pavillion is administered by Fremont County School District #6. Zoned campuses include Wind River Elementary School (grades K–5) and Wind River Middle/High School (grades 6–12).

== Notable people ==
- Matthew Fox, actor

== See also ==
- List of municipalities in Wyoming

== External link ==
Media related to Pavillion, Wyoming at Wikimedia Commons
