= Fremont County, Wyoming =

County in Wyoming, United States

- County
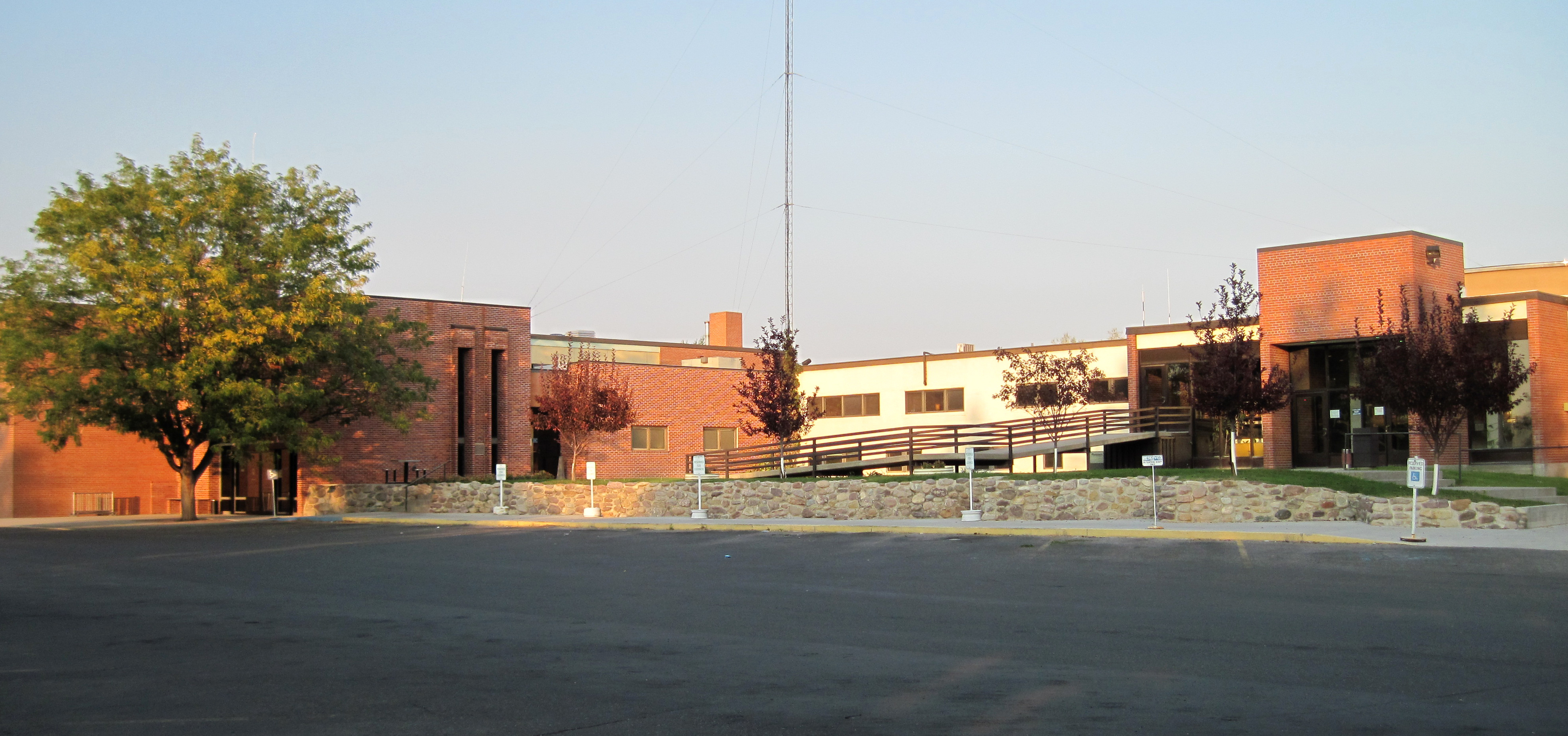
- Fremont County Courthouse in Lander

- Location within the U.S. state of Wyoming
- Coordinates: 43°02′N 108°38′W
- Country: United States
- State: Wyoming
- Founded: March 5, 1884
- Named for: John C. Frémont
- Seat: Lander
- Largest city: Riverton

Area
  - Total: 9,266 sq mi (24,000 km^{2})
  - Land: 9,184 sq mi (23,790 km^{2})
  - Water: 82 sq mi (210 km^{2}) 0.9%

Population (2020)
  - Total: 39,234
  - Estimate (2025): 39,464 ▲
  - Density: 4.272/sq mi (1.649/km^{2})
- Time zone: UTC−7 (Mountain)
  - Summer (DST): UTC−6 (MDT)
- Congressional district: At-large
- Website: www.fremontcountywy.org

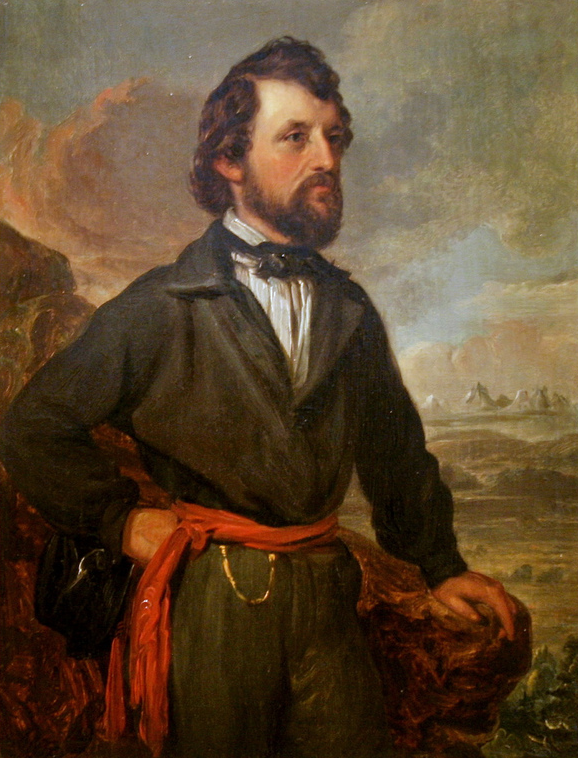
John C. Frémont

Fremont County is a county in the U.S. state of Wyoming. As of the 2020 United States census, the population was 39,234, making it the fifth-most populous county in Wyoming. Its county seat is Lander. The county was founded in 1884 and is named for John C. Frémont, a general, explorer, and politician. It is roughly the size of the state of Vermont. Fremont County comprises the Riverton, WY Micropolitan Statistical Area.

== History ==
Fremont County was created on March 5, 1884, by the legislature of the Wyoming Territory. The county was created with land ceded by Sweetwater County. In 1890, Big Horn County was carved out of Fremont, Johnson, and Sheridan Counties. Hot Springs County was created in 1911 from parts of Fremont, Big Horn, and Park counties. In 1921, Sublette County was created from parts of Fremont and Lincoln counties, leaving Fremont County's boundary at its present configuration.

Fremont County was named for John Charles Frémont, an explorer of the American West, United States Senator from California, and 1856 Republican presidential candidate. Fremont County is the site of the Wind River Indian Reservation, home of the Eastern Shoshone and Northern Arapaho tribes of Native Americans.

== Geography ==
According to the U.S. Census Bureau, the county has a total area of 9,266 square miles (24,000 km^{2}), of which 9,184 square miles (23,790 km^{2}) is land and 82 square miles (210 km^{2}) (0.9%) is water. It is the second-largest county by area in Wyoming, as well as in the six Rocky Mountain States. Elevations and climate range from desert at Boysen State Park to glaciers at 13,804-foot (4,207 m) Gannett Peak, the highest point not only in Wyoming but in the three Central Rockies states of Wyoming, Idaho and Montana. The southern end of the county is traversed by the Oregon Trail and in the northwest corner lies Dubois, a gateway town for Yellowstone National Park and Grand Teton National Park. Although the county seat is Lander, the largest community is Riverton, home of Central Wyoming College and the economic hub of the region. A large portion of the western edge of the county follows the Continental Divide at the crest of the Wind River Range of the Rocky Mountains, known for its wilderness areas and home of the largest glaciers in the American Rocky Mountains.

=== Adjacent counties ===
- Hot Springs County – north
- Washakie County – northeast
- Natrona County – east
- Carbon County – southeast
- Sweetwater County – south
- Sublette County – west
- Teton County – northwest
- Park County – northwest

=== Major highways ===
- U.S. Highway 20
- U.S. Highway 26
- U.S. Highway 287
- Wyoming Highway 28
- Wyoming Highway 131
- Wyoming Highway 132
- Wyoming Highway 133
- Wyoming Highway 134
- Wyoming Highway 135
- Wyoming Highway 136
- Wyoming Highway 138
- Wyoming Highway 789

=== Transit ===
- Express Arrow
- Wind River Transportation Authority

=== National protected areas ===
- Bridger National Forest (part)
- Shoshone National Forest (part)
- Teton National Forest (part)

The Bridger National Forest and the Teton National Forest have been administratively combined into the Bridger–Teton National Forest. Fremont County contains portions of both originally-designated forests.

== Demographics ==
Historical population
Census	Pop.	Note	%±
1890	2,463		—
1900	5,357		117.5%
1910	11,822		120.7%
1920	11,820		0.0%
1930	10,490		−11.3%
1940	16,095		53.4%
1950	19,580		21.7%
1960	26,168		33.6%
1970	28,352		8.3%
1980	38,992		37.5%
1990	33,662		−13.7%
2000	35,804		6.4%
2010	40,123		12.1%
2020	39,234		−2.2%
2025 (est.)	39,464	▲	0.6%
US Decennial Census; 1870–2000 2010–2020

=== 2020 census ===
As of the 2020 census, the county had a population of 39,234. Of the residents, 24.6% were under the age of 18 and 20.1% were 65 years of age or older; the median age was 40.0 years. For every 100 females there were 101.0 males, and for every 100 females age 18 and over there were 98.2 males.

Fremont County, Wyoming – Racial and ethnic composition Note: the US Census treats Hispanic/Latino as an ethnic category. This table excludes Latinos from the racial categories and assigns them to a separate category. Hispanics/Latinos may be of any race.
Race / Ethnicity (NH = Non-Hispanic)	Pop 2000	Pop 2010	Pop 2020	% 2000	% 2010	% 2020
White alone (NH)	26,693	28,677	26,586	74.55%	71.47%	67.76%
Black or African American alone (NH)	43	86	166	0.12%	0.21%	0.42%
Native American or Alaska Native alone (NH)	6,743	8,025	7,798	18.83%	20.00%	19.88%
Asian alone (NH)	100	151	205	0.28%	0.38%	0.52%
Pacific Islander alone (NH)	8	7	7	0.02%	0.02%	0.02%
Other race alone (NH)	25	24	136	0.07%	0.06%	0.35%
Mixed race or Multiracial (NH)	626	889	1,915	1.75%	2.22%	4.88%
Hispanic or Latino (any race)	1,566	2,264	2,421	4.37%	5.64%	6.17%
Total	35,804	40,123	39,234	100.00%	100.00%	100.00%

The racial makeup of the county was 69.4% White, 0.5% Black or African American, 20.9% American Indian and Alaska Native, 0.6% Asian, 1.8% from some other race, and 6.9% from two or more races. Hispanic or Latino residents of any race comprised 6.2% of the population.

There were 15,146 households in the county, of which 30.9% had children under the age of 18 living with them and 25.9% had a female householder with no spouse or partner present. About 28.9% of all households were made up of individuals and 13.7% had someone living alone who was 65 years of age or older.

There were 17,407 housing units, of which 13.0% were vacant. Among occupied housing units, 71.6% were owner-occupied and 28.4% were renter-occupied. The homeowner vacancy rate was 1.6% and the rental vacancy rate was 8.7%.

=== 2010 census ===
As of the 2010 United States census, there were 40,123 people, 15,455 households, and 10,360 families residing in the county. The population density was 4.4 people per square mile (1.7 people/km^{2}). There were 17,796 housing units at an average density of 1.9 units per square mile (0.73 units/km^{2}). The racial makeup of the county was 74.3% white, 21.2% American Indian, 0.4% Asian, 0.3% black or African American, 1.0% from other races, and 2.8% from two or more races. Those of Hispanic or Latino origin made up 5.6% of the population. In terms of ancestry, 21.7% were German, 13.5% were English, 12.2% were Irish, and 7.7% were American.

Of the 15,455 households, 32.3% had children under the age of 18 living with them, 49.3% were married couples living together, 12.2% had a female householder with no husband present, 33.0% were non-families, and 27.0% of all households were made up of individuals. The average household size was 2.54 and the average family size was 3.07. The median age was 38.5 years.

The median income for a household in the county was $46,397 and the median income for a family was $55,531. Males had a median income of $44,087 versus $27,751 for females. The per capita income for the county was $24,173. About 10.3% of families and 14.0% of the population were below the poverty line, including 20.7% of those under age 18 and 6.4% of those age 65 or over.

=== 2000 census ===
As of the 2000 United States census, there were 35,804 people, 13,545 households, and 9,481 families in Fremont County. The population density was 4 people per square mile (1.5 people/km^{2}). There were 15,541 housing units at an average density of 2 units per square mile (0.77 units/km^{2}). The racial makeup was 76.49% White, 0.12% Black or African American, 19.68% Native American, 0.30% Asian, 0.03% Pacific Islander, 1.16% from other races, and 2.21% from two or more races. 4.37% of the population were Hispanic or Latino of any race. 22.1% were of German, 9.9% English, 8.2% Irish and 6.3% American ancestry.

There were 13,545 households, out of which 32.20% had children under the age of 18 living with them, 54.30% were married couples living together, 10.90% had a female householder with no husband present, and 30.00% were non-families. 25.50% of all households were made up of individuals, and 10.00% had someone living alone who was 65 years of age or older. The average household size was 2.58 and the average family size was 3.10.

The county population contained 27.40% under the age of 18, 8.30% from 18 to 24, 25.90% from 25 to 44, 25.00% from 45 to 64, and 13.30% who were 65 years of age or older. The median age was 38 years. For every 100 females there were 98.20 males. For every 100 females age 18 and over, there were 95.40 males.

The median income for a household in the county was $32,503, and the median income for a family was $37,983. Males had a median income of $30,620 versus $19,802 for females. The per capita income for the county was $16,519. About 13.30% of families and 17.60% of the population were below the poverty line, including 23.70% of those under age 18 and 12.50% of those age 65 or over.

== Government and infrastructure ==
The Wyoming Department of Corrections Wyoming Honor Farm is located in Riverton. The Wyoming Department of Health Wyoming Life Resource Center (WLRC), originally the Wyoming State Training School (WSTS), a residential facility for physically and mentally disabled people, is located in Lander. Both facilities were operated by the Wyoming Board of Charities and Reform until that agency was dissolved as a result of a state constitutional amendment passed in November 1990.

Fremont County voters have been reliably Republican for decades. Since 1936, in only one national election did the county voters select the Democratic Party candidate (as of 2024).

Despite the county's strong Republican lean, a few Democratic-leaning precincts exist west of the county seat of Riverton, in the Wind River Indian Reservation. The county’s state legislative delegation also includes one Democrat within the House of Representatives.

United States presidential election results for Fremont County, Wyoming
Year	Republican		Democratic		Third party(ies)	
Year	No.	%	No.	%	No.	%
1892	648	54.45%	0	0.00%	542	45.55%
1896	535	50.28%	523	49.15%	6	0.56%
1900	919	63.03%	539	36.97%	0	0.00%
1904	1,009	63.06%	563	35.19%	28	1.75%
1908	1,838	58.74%	1,190	38.03%	101	3.23%
1912	811	33.03%	993	40.45%	651	26.52%
1916	1,407	43.28%	1,752	53.89%	92	2.83%
1920	2,194	67.61%	994	30.63%	57	1.76%
1924	1,986	51.73%	561	14.61%	1,292	33.65%
1928	2,267	60.65%	1,449	38.76%	22	0.59%
1932	1,696	38.77%	2,612	59.72%	66	1.51%
1936	2,357	42.60%	3,050	55.12%	126	2.28%
1940	3,788	58.70%	2,644	40.97%	21	0.33%
1944	3,193	59.46%	2,177	40.54%	0	0.00%
1948	3,357	52.45%	3,019	47.17%	24	0.38%
1952	5,881	72.94%	2,161	26.80%	21	0.26%
1956	4,887	65.54%	2,569	34.46%	0	0.00%
1960	5,738	57.46%	4,248	42.54%	0	0.00%
1964	4,809	44.55%	5,985	55.45%	0	0.00%
1968	5,417	57.64%	3,093	32.91%	888	9.45%
1972	7,359	69.12%	3,248	30.51%	40	0.38%
1976	6,584	59.51%	4,423	39.98%	56	0.51%
1980	9,077	67.72%	3,307	24.67%	1,019	7.60%
1984	9,885	70.61%	3,969	28.35%	145	1.04%
1988	7,681	59.59%	5,020	38.95%	188	1.46%
1992	5,387	38.77%	4,765	34.29%	3,744	26.94%
1996	7,554	50.28%	5,445	36.24%	2,025	13.48%
2000	10,560	68.38%	4,172	27.01%	712	4.61%
2004	11,429	66.85%	5,338	31.22%	329	1.92%
2008	11,083	63.00%	6,016	34.20%	493	2.80%
2012	11,075	65.38%	5,333	31.48%	531	3.13%
2016	11,167	65.60%	4,200	24.67%	1,656	9.73%
2020	12,007	66.30%	5,519	30.47%	585	3.23%
2024	11,552	66.94%	5,179	30.01%	525	3.04%

== Communities ==
=== Cities ===
- Lander (county seat)
- Riverton

=== Towns ===
- Dubois
- Hudson
- Pavillion
- Shoshoni

=== Census-designated places ===
- Arapahoe
- Atlantic City
- Boulder Flats
- Crowheart
- Ethete
- Fort Washakie
- Jeffrey City
- Johnstown

=== Unincorporated communities ===
- Dunoir
- Kinnear
- Lost Cabin
- Lysite
- Midval
- Moneta
- St. Stephens
- Sand Draw
- South Pass City
- Sweetwater Crossing (Sweetwater Station)
- Willow Creek

=== Former communities ===
- Miner's Delight (Hamilton City)

== See also ==
- National Register of Historic Places listings in Fremont County, Wyoming
- Wyoming
  - List of municipalities in Wyoming
  - List of counties in Wyoming
  - Wyoming statistical areas

== In popular culture ==
In his poem The Ballad of Jesus Ortiz, Dana Gioia describes how his great-grandfather, a Mexican immigrant from Sonora, worked as a Wild West cow-puncher and was later murdered by a disgruntled and racist patron while working as a saloon keeper in the Fremont County town of Lost Cabin, Wyoming in 1910.

The movie Wind River is set on the Wind River Indian Reservation, which is inside Fremont County.

Scenes from the movie Taking Chance were set in Dubois, a town within Fremont County. The real-life Chance Phelps from the film was born in Riverton and is buried in Dubois, both in Fremont County.
