= Breccia Peak =

Breccia Peak may refer to mountains/peaks:

- Breccia Peak (Wyoming)
- Breccia Peak (British Columbia)
- Breccia Peak (Washington)
