= Wyoming Highway 13 =

State highway in Carbon and Albany counties in Wyoming, United States

Wyoming Highway 13
- Arlington Road
- WYO 13 highlighted in red

Route information
- Maintained by WYDOT
- Length: 17.325 mi (27.882 km)

Major junctions
- West end: I-80 in Arlington
- East end: US 30 / US 287 north of Rock River

Location
- Country: United States
- State: Wyoming
- Counties: Carbon, Albany

Highway system
- Wyoming State Highway System; Interstate; US; State
← WYO 12	→ US 14

Wyoming Highway 13 (WYO 13), also known as Arlington Road, is a 17.325-mile (27.882 km) state highway in Carbon and Albany counties in Wyoming, United States, that connects Interstate 80 (I-80) in Arlington with U.S. Route 30 / U.S. Route 287 (US 30 / US 287), north of Rock River.

== Route description ==
WYO 13 begins at a folded diamond interchange on I-80 and the west end of Elk Mountain Arlington Road in the census-designated place of Arlington in eastern Carbon County. (I-80 heads east towards Laramie and Cheyenne and west towards Elk Mountain and Rawlins. Elk Mountain Arlington Road heads west toward another interchange with I-80 and on to Elk Mountain.)

From its western terminus WYO 13 proceeds northeasterly as a two-lane road (for its entire length) to pass through Arlington. About 3.3 miles (5.3 km) along its course, WYO 13 crosses over Rock Creek and then passes through the unincorporated community of McFadden, roughly three miles (4.8 km) later. Approximately 9.3 miles (15.0 km) along its route, WYO 13 leaves Carbon County and enters Albany County.

About 14 miles (23 km) from its western terminus, WYO 13 has a second bridge over Rock Creek. Northeast of the creek, WYO 12 has a bridge over two sets of Union Pacific Railroad tracks before reaching its eastern terminus at a T intersection with US 30 / US 287, just north of the town of Rock River. (US 30 / US 287 heads east to pass through Rock River and then on towards Bosler and Laramie. US 30 / US 287 heads west towards Medicine Bow and Rawlins.)

Interstate 80 is frequently closed during the winter months, and a sign posted near the highway's northern terminus at US 30 / US 287 indicates whether the road is currently closed.

== History ==
Maps as early as 1927 showed an unimproved road between the communities of Arlington and Rock River. (At that time the section of US 30 through Rock River was commonly known as part of the Lincoln Highway.) A 1940 Rand McNally map and a 1956 Gousha map both show an unnumbered state highway running southwest from Rock River to McFadden and an unimproved road continuing southwest to connect with another unimproved road (at a point southeast of Arlington) that ran between Millbrook (a community roughly 20 miles [32 km] west of Laramie) and Elk Mountain, via Arlington.

By 1955 a United States Geological Survey (USGS) map showed Wyoming Highway 137 (WYO 137) heading westerly along Avenue C from US 30 / US 287 in Rock River to connect with the current routing of WYO 13. The 1958 and 1976 versions of a USGS map of a different quadrangle show this highway continuing southwest to end at McFadden, but do not indicate a highway number. A 1981 USGS map still labeled this highway as WYO 137.

A 1983 USGS map finally labels the highway as WYO 13. The same map also indicates that WYO 13 had been rerouted along a section northeast of McFadden to more closely parallel the southwest bank of Threemile Creek. The former routing is now known as Old State Hwy 13. A 1988 USGS map shows the routing of WYO 13 from MaFadden southeast to end at I-80 in Arlington. The section of highway that ran south from near McFadden to end southeast of Arlington is now also known as Old State Hwy 13.

While a 2012 USGS map still indicated that WYO 13's eastern end was still along Avenue C in Rock River, by 2015 the map of the same quadrangle showed the eastern end having been rerouted to is current course to end north of Rock River. The same map indicated the former routing (now also known as Old State Hwy 13) no longer crossed the railway tracks along Avenue C. Only about 1.8 miles (2.9 km) of the current WYO 13 runs along the original routing of the highway.

== Major intersections ==
Actual mile markers increase from east to west.

County	Location	mi	km	Destinations	Notes
Carbon	Arlington	0.000	0.000	CR 402 south	Continuation south from western terminus
Carbon	Arlington	0.000	0.000	I-80 east (Dwight D. Eisenhower Hwy) – Laramie, Cheyenne I-80 west (Dwight D. Eisenhower Hwy) – Elk Mountain, Rawlins; Elk Mountain Arlington Rd west – I-80, Elk Mountain	Western terminus; folded diamond interchange exit 272 on I-80; Elk Mountain Rd connects with WYO 13 opposite the eastbound ramps
Carbon		3.274	5.269	Bridge over Rock Creek	
Carbon	McFadden	6.085	9.793	Baysinger Rd west	T intersection
Carbon	McFadden	8.3	13.4	Old State Hwy 13 east – WYO 13, Rock River	T intersection; former routing of WYO 13
Albany		14.9	24.0	Old State Hwy 13 west – WYO 13, McFadden	T intersection; former routing of WYO 13
Albany		14.965	24.084	Bridge over Rock Creek	
Albany		16.1	25.9	Old State Hwy 13 east – Rock River	T intersection; former routing of WYO 13; road still enters Rock River, but no longer continues east over the railway tracks
Albany		17.004	27.365	Bridge over Union Pacific Railroad tracks	
Albany		17.325	27.882	US 30 east / US 287 south – Rock River, Bosler, Laramie US 30 west / US 287 north – Medicine Bow, Rawlins	Eastern terminus; T intersection
1.000 mi = 1.609 km; 1.000 km = 0.621 mi

== See also ==
- List of state highways in Wyoming
