= McFadden, Wyoming =

Unincorporated community in Carbon County, Wyoming, United States

- Unincorporated community
- Location within the state of Wyoming McFadden (the United States)
- Coordinates: 41°39′16″N 106°7′50″W
- Country: United States
- State: Wyoming
- County: Carbon
- Elevation: 7,627 ft (2,325 m)
- Time zone: UTC-7 (Mountain (MST))
  - Summer (DST): UTC-6 (MDT)
- ZIP codes: 82083
- GNIS feature ID: 1609123

McFadden is an unincorporated community along Rock Creek near the eastern edge of Carbon County, Wyoming, United States. The community was originally known as Ohio City.

== Description ==
The community lies along Wyoming Highway 13 (which connects Interstate 80 in Arlington on the southwest with the concurrency U.S. Route 30 and U.S. Route 287 on the northeast, just north Rock River). Its elevation is 7,267 feet (2,215 m).

While the community had a post office from 1921 to 1996, it still retains its own ZIP Code of 82083.
