= U.S. Route 287 in Wyoming =

Segment of American highway

U.S. Highway 287
- US 287 highlighted in red

Route information
- Maintained by WYDOT
- Length: 462.723 mi (744.680 km)

Major junctions
- South end: US 287 at the Colorado state line near Tie Siding
- I-80 (numerous times); US 30 from Laramie to Rawlins; US 26 from Morton to Moran; US 89 / US 191 from Moran to Yellowstone National Park
- North end: Southern entrance of Yellowstone National Park

Location
- Country: United States
- State: Wyoming
- Counties: Albany, Carbon, Natrona, Fremont, Teton

Highway system
- United States Numbered Highway System; List; Special; Divided; Wyoming State Highway System; Interstate; US; State
← WYO 273	→ WYO 290

U.S. Route 287 (US 287) is a part of the U.S. Highway System that travels from Port Arthur, Texas northwest to Choteau, Montana; broken into two segments by Yellowstone National Park where unnumbered park roads serve as a connector. In the state of Wyoming, it extends approximately 463 miles (745 km) from the Colorado state line near Tie Siding to the southern entrance of Yellowstone National Park.

== Route description ==
US 287 enters Wyoming about eight miles (13 km) south of Tie Siding; about a mile north of the state line it crosses Pumpkin Vine Hill (elevation 8,106 ft or 2,471 m), a pass between the Laramie Mountains to the east and the Medicine Bow Mountains to the west. US 287 reaches Laramie where it crosses I-80 and begins a 113-mile (182 km) concurrency with US 30. The two highways head north for 57 miles (92 km) to Medicine Bow, then turn west-southwest for 36 miles (58 km) and return to I-80 near Walcott, where they merge with the interstate west for 20 miles (32 km) to Rawlins. US 287 branches off from I-80 and US 30 and heads into Rawlins concurrent with I-80 Business and US 30 Business. In downtown Rawlins, US 287 departs the Business Route and merges with WYO 789 to form a 123-mile (198 km) concurrency to Lander. US 287 heads northwest from Lander for 32 miles (51 km) to Diversion Dam Junction, about 10 miles (16 km) west of Morton, and merges with US 26 were they continue 43 miles (69 km) west to Dubois.

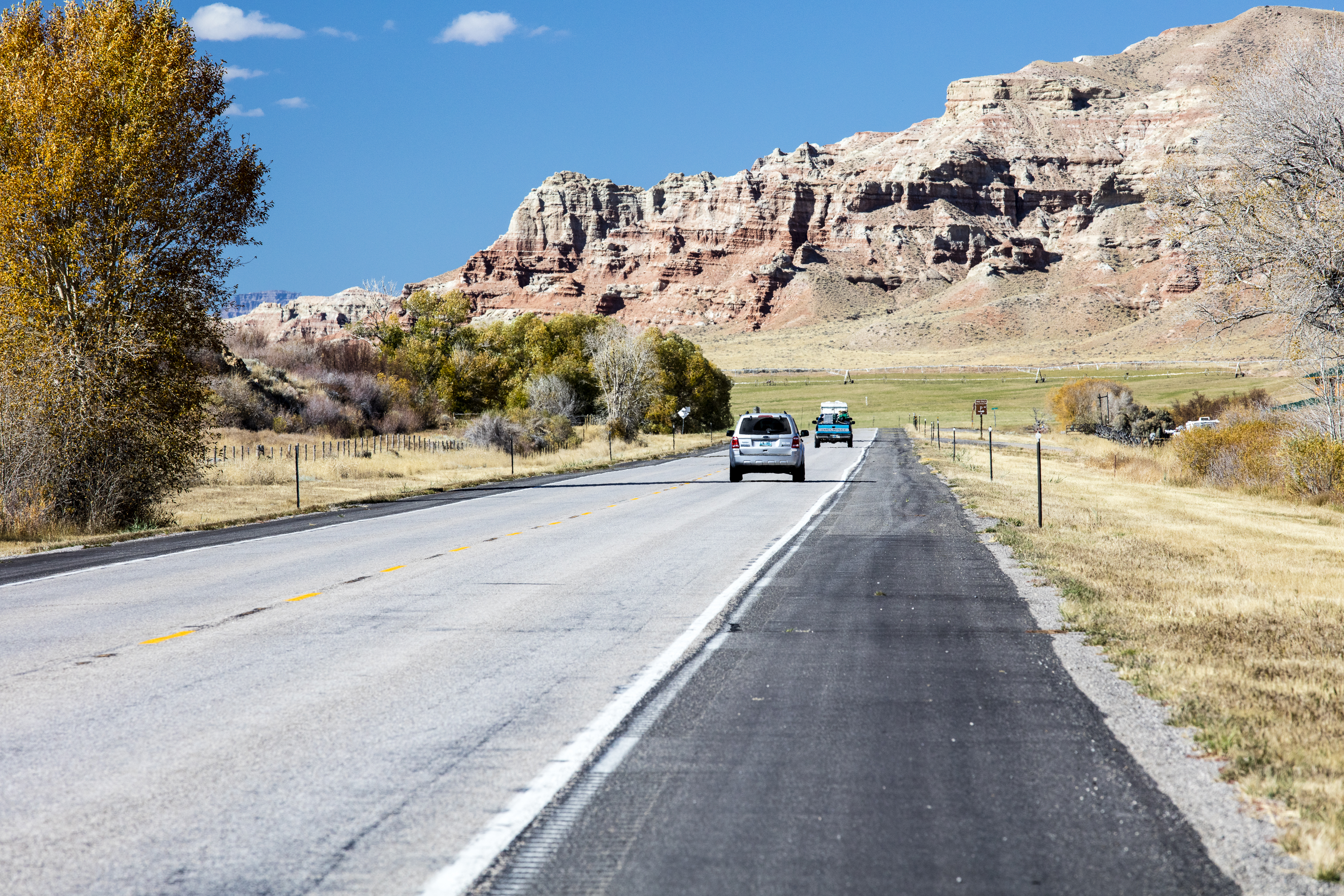
US 26/US 287 near Dubois

West of Dubois, the routes become part of the Wyoming Centennial Scenic Byway, and they enter the very mountainous terrain of West Central Wyoming, crossing the Continental Divide at Togwotee Pass and enter Grand Teton National Park. At Moran, US 287 concludes its a 142-mile (229 km) concurrency with US 26 and becomes concurrent US 191 and US 89. The three routes travel 20 miles (32 km) north unsigned along side Jackson Lake. Leaving Grand Teton National Park, they travel seven miles (11 km) through John D. Rockefeller Jr. Memorial Parkway before reaching the South Entrance of Yellowstone National Park. Officially US 287 and other U.S. Routes are officially discontinuous through the park, though some commercially produced maps show these highways running inside Yellowstone National Park itself along its unnumbered roads. US 287 along with US 191 resume at the West Entrance at West Yellowstone, Montana.

== History ==
U.S. Route 285
- Location: Colorado state line–Laramie
- Length: 24 mi (39 km)
- Existed: 1926–1936

The section of US 287 between Laramie and the Colorado state line was originally commissioned as US 285 in 1926, with it to continue to Denver. It was renumbered to US 287 in 1936.

== Major intersections ==
County	Location	mi	km	Exit	Destinations	Notes
Albany		0.000	0.000		US 287 south – Fort Collins	Continuation into Colorado
Albany	Laramie	24.430	39.316		I-80 – Rock Springs, Cheyenne	I-80 exit 313
Albany	Laramie	24.366	39.213		I-80 BL east / US 30 east (Grand Avenue)	Southern end of I-80 BL / US 30 concurrency
Albany	Laramie	24.628	39.635		WYO 130 west / WYO 230 west (Snowy Range Road) / Harney Street – Centennial	
Albany	Laramie	25.475	40.998		I-80 BL west (Curtis Street) to I-80 / Reynold Street	Northern end of I-80 BL concurrency
Albany	Bosler	42.000	67.592		WYO 34 east – Wheatland	
Albany	Rock River	63.873	102.794		WYO 13 west – McFadden, Arlington	
Carbon	Medicine Bow	81.207	130.690		WYO 487 north – Casper	
Carbon	Hanna	100.133	161.148		WYO 72 – Hanna, Elk Mountain	
Carbon	Walcott Junction	117.617	189.286	235	WYO 130 east / WYO 230 east – Saratoga I-80 east – Laramie	Southern end of I-80 concurrency; exit numbers follow I-80
Carbon		124.504	200.370	228	Fort Steele	
Carbon		124.504	200.370	Fort Steele Rest Area		
Carbon	Sinclair	130.919	210.694	221	WYO 76 west – Sinclair	
Carbon	Sinclair	133.231	214.415	219	Lincoln Avenue – Sinclair	
Carbon	Rawlins	137.255	220.891	215	I-80 west / US 30 west – Rock Springs I-80 BL begins / US 30 Bus. begins	Northern end of I-80 / US 30 concurrency; southern end of I-80 BL / US 30 Bus. concurrency
Carbon	Rawlins	137.255	220.891		WYO 76 east	No northbound exit
Carbon	Rawlins	138.023	222.126		US 287 Byp. north (Hingley Boulevard)	
Carbon	Rawlins	139.506	224.513		I-80 BL west / US 30 Bus. west / WYO 789 south (Spruce Street) – Rock Springs	Northern end of I-80 BL / US 30 Bus. concurrency; southern end of WYO 789 concurrency
Carbon	Rawlins	141.228	227.284		US 287 Byp. south (Hingley Boulevard)	Southern end of Chief Washakie Trail
Carbon		170.322	274.107		WYO 73 west – Bairoil	
Carbon		181.369	291.885		WYO 220 east / California National Historic Trail / Mormon Pioneer National Historic Trail / Oregon National Historic Trail / Pony Express National Historic Trail – Casper	
Natrona	No major junctions					
Fremont		223.475	359.648		WYO 135 north – Riverton	
Fremont		223.475	359.648		Sweetwater Station Rest Area	
Fremont		253.662	408.229		WYO 28 west / California National Historic Trail / Mormon Pioneer National Historic Trail / Oregon National Historic Trail / Pony Express National Historic Trail – Rock Springs	
Fremont	Lander	262.076	421.770		WYO 789 north / Buena Vista Drive – Riverton	Southern end of WYO 789 concurrency
Fremont	Lander	262.688	422.755		WYO 131 south (Snakes Canyon Road) / 5th Street	
Fremont		271.405	436.784		WYO 132 north (Blue Sky Highway)	
Fremont	Diversion Dam Junction	293.722	472.700		US 26 east – Riverton	Northern end of Chief Washakie Trail; southern end of US 26 concurrency
Fremont		296.074	476.485		Diversion Dam Rest Area	
Fremont	Dubois	336.683	541.839		Wyoming Centennial Scenic Byway begins	Southern end of Wyoming Centennial Scenic Byway concurrency; Wyoming Centennial Scenic Byway northern terminus
Teton		410.106	660.002		Togwotee Pass (Continental Divide)	
Teton	Grand Teton National Park	433.539	697.713		Grand Teton National Park boundary	
Teton	Grand Teton National Park	435.743	701.260		US 26 west / US 89 south / US 191 south / Wyoming Centennial Scenic Byway south – Jackson	Northern end of US 26 / Wyoming Centennial Scenic Byway concurrency; southern end of US 89 / US 191 concurrency
Teton	Grand Teton National Park	439.755	707.717		Moran Entrance Station	
Teton	Grand Teton National Park	455.951	733.782		Grand Teton National Park boundary	
Teton	John D. Rockefeller Jr. Memorial Parkway	No major junctions				
Teton	Yellowstone National Park	462.723	744.680		US 89 ends / US 191 ends	US 89 / US 191 / US 287 northern terminus; north end of US 89 / US 191 concurrency
Teton	Yellowstone National Park	462.723	744.680	Yellowstone National Park boundary (South Entrance)		
Teton	Yellowstone National Park	462.723	744.680		South Entrance Road (to US 89 north / US 191 north / US 287 north)	Continuation into Yellowstone National Park; US 89 resumes in Montana at the park's north entrance; US 191 / US 287 resume in Montana at the park's west entrance
1.000 mi = 1.609 km; 1.000 km = 0.621 mi: Closed/former; Concurrency terminus; Tolled

== Rawlins bypass route ==
U.S. Highway 287 Bypass
- Location: Rawlins
- Length: 1.518 mi (2.443 km)

U.S. Highway 287 Bypass (US 287 Byp.) serves as a 1.5-mile (2.4 km) bypass for Rawlins.

Major intersections

The entire route is in Rawlins, Carbon County.

mi	km	Destinations	Notes
0.000	0.000	US 287 / I-80 BL / US 30 Bus. to I-80 / US 30 – Laramie	Southern terminus
1.518	2.443	US 287 / WYO 789 – Casper, Lander	Northern terminus
1.000 mi = 1.609 km; 1.000 km = 0.621 mi

== See also ==
U.S. Route 287
Previous state: Colorado	Wyoming	Next state: Montana
