= Wyoming Highway 130 =

State highway in Wyoming, United States

Wyoming Highway 130
- Snowy Range Road
- WYO 130 highlighted in red

Route information
- Auxiliary route of US 30
- Maintained by WYDOT
- Length: 98.52 mi (158.55 km)

Major junctions
- West end: I-80 / US 30 / US 287 in Walcott
- I-80 in Laramie
- East end: I-80 BL / US 30 / US 287 in Laramie

Location
- Country: United States
- State: Wyoming
- Counties: Albany, Carbon

Highway system
- Wyoming State Highway System; Interstate; US; State
← WYO 120	→ WYO 131

Wyoming Highway 130 (WYO 130) is a 98.52-mile-long (158.55 km) state highway in the U.S. State of Wyoming. It is known locally as the Snowy Range Road. It makes its way west from Laramie across the plains, and rises over the Medicine Bow Mountains. The road then turns north through the town of Saratoga, and ends at Interstate 80 (I-80). The stretch of road over the mountains is a National Forest Byway. WYO 130 over Snowy Range Pass is closed during winter (November–May).

== Route description ==
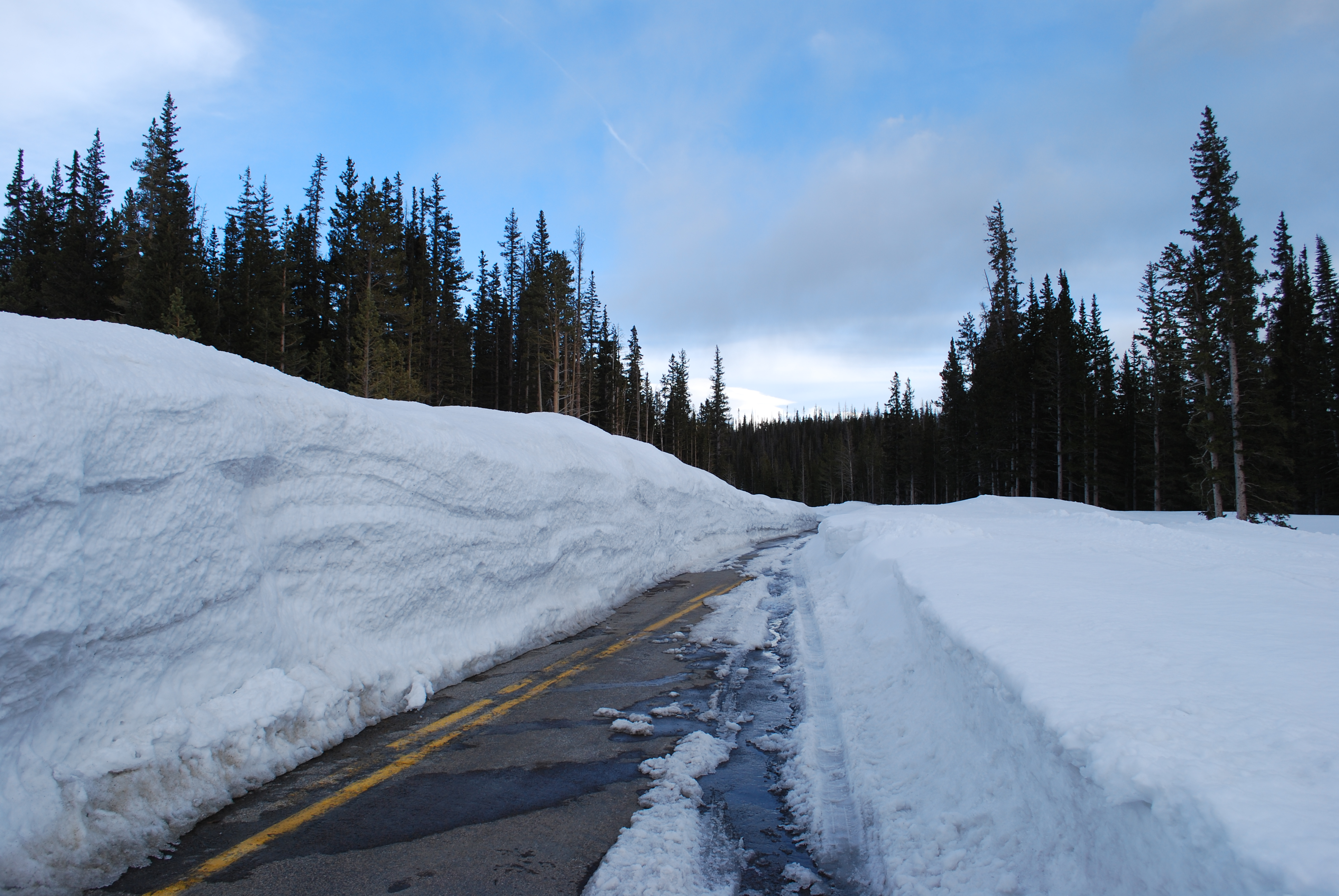
Closed section of Highway 130 (April 2014).

Wyoming Highway 130 travels from Interstate 80 (Exit 235) and US 30/US 287 at Walcott south through Saratoga, intersecting unsigned Wyoming Highway 74 at 20.3 miles (32.7 km), and continuing further south to a junction with Wyoming Highway 230 at 28.2 miles (45.4 km), where WYO 130 turns east to head to Laramie. WYO 130 heads east across the Medicine Bow Mountains (or Snowy Range Mountains) and through part of the Medicine Bow National Forest, and passes through Centennial at around 69 miles (111 km). Six miles east of Centennial, 130 intersects Wyoming Highway 11 which provides a route to Albany. From there Highway 130 travels 17 miles (27 km) in a relatively due east direction over rolling hills. At 91.7 miles (147.6 km) Wyoming Highway 12 is intersected, and at 96.2 miles (154.8 km) Highway 130 meets Highway 230 once again just west of Laramie. From here the routes 130 and 230 run together (or concurrent) into Laramie as Snowy Range Road. This is the only instance in Wyoming where two state routes are merged. Shortly after, Snowy Range Road (WYO 130/WYO 230) has an interchange with I-80 (Exit 311). Almost 2 miles (3.2 km) after that interchange Wyoming Highway 130, as well as Wyoming Highway 230, ends at I-80 BUS/US 30/US 287.

== History ==
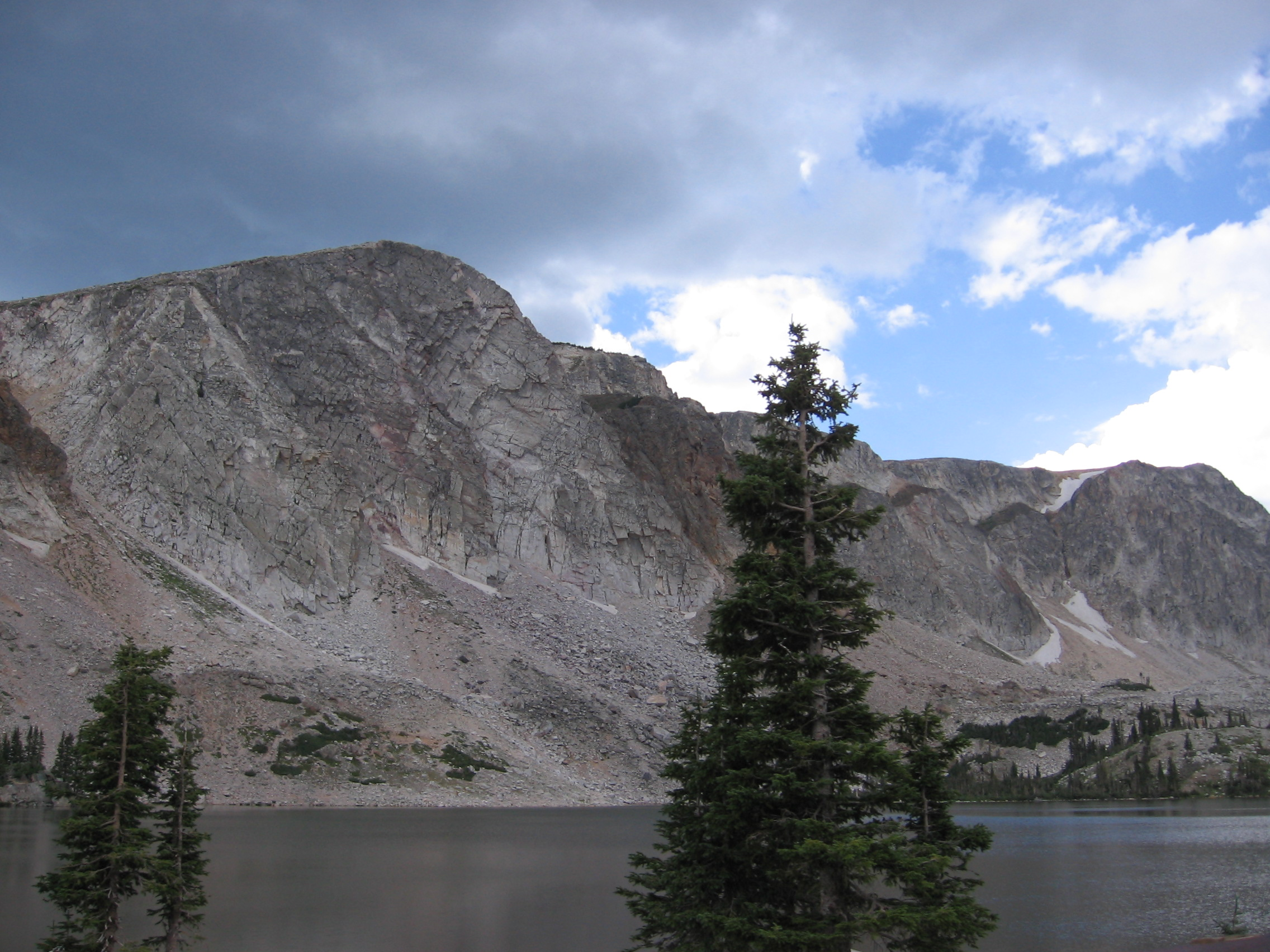
Lake Marie and the Medicine Bow Range from Highway 130

Highway 130 used to begin in downtown Saratoga at the current unmarked junction with Wyoming Highway 74 (the corner of First and Bridge Streets). The current routing of Wyoming 130 from the Highway 74 junction south to the Highway 230 junction was once part of Wyoming Highway 70. Originally Highway 130 traveled southeast along the Carbon County Route 504 (Ryan Park Road) path to Ryan Park. The roadway from Ryan Park to the WYO 130/WYO 230 junction was not built at that time. Then 130 resumes its current course east to Centennial and Laramie.

== Major intersections ==
County	Location	mi	km	Destinations	Notes
Carbon		0.00	0.00	US 30 east / US 287 south – Medicine Bow	Continuation beyond I-80
Carbon		0.00	0.00	I-80 / US 30 west / US 287 north – Laramie, Rawlins	Western terminus; exit 235 on I-80
Carbon	Saratoga	20.3	32.7	Bridge Street (WYO 74) – Pennock Mountain Wildlife Habitat Management Area	
Carbon		28.2	45.4	WYO 230 east – Riverside	Western terminus of WYO 230
Carbon		50.62	81.46	Parking area	
Stretch of road closed winters
Albany		61.25	98.57	Brooklyn Lake Road	
Albany		74.6	120.1	WYO 11 – Rob Roy Reservoir, Lake Owen	
Albany		91.4	147.1	WYO 12 – Herrick Lake	
Albany		93.5	150.5	General Brees Road (WYO 14)	Access to Laramie Regional Airport
Albany	Laramie	96.2	154.8	WYO 230 west (Jackson Street) – Woods Landing, Walden Colo.	West end of concurrency with WYO 230
Albany	Laramie	97.0	156.1	I-80 – Rawlins, Cheyenne	Exit 311 on I-80
Albany	Laramie	98.52	158.55	WYO 230 ends US 287 / US 30 / I-80 BL (3rd Street)	Eastern termini of WYO 130 and WYO 230; east end of concurrency with WYO 230
1.000 mi = 1.609 km; 1.000 km = 0.621 mi: Concurrency terminus
