= Wyoming Highway 14 =

State highway in Wyoming, United States

Wyoming Highway 14
- WYO 14 highlighted in red

Route information
- Maintained by WYDOT
- Length: 0.36 mi (580 m)

Major junctions
- South end: Laramie Regional Airport near Laramie
- North end: WYO 130 near Laramie

Location
- Country: United States
- State: Wyoming
- Counties: Albany

Highway system
- Wyoming State Highway System; Interstate; US; State
← US 14A	→ US 16

Wyoming Highway 14 (WYO 14) is a 0.36-mile-long (0.58 km) unsigned Wyoming state highway connecting Wyoming Highway 130 with Laramie Regional Airport, just west of Laramie.

== Route description ==
Highway 14 is one of the shortest state-maintained routes in the state, at just 0.36 miles (0.58 km) in length. It connects WYO 130 (Snowy Range Road) with Laramie Regional Airport.

== History ==
Wyoming Highway 14 was the old designation for the current ALT US 14 between Cody and Burgess Junction located in Park and Big Horn Counties in northwestern Wyoming. That routing existed between 1940 and approximately 1965. Confusion between WYO 14 and US 14 caused the Wyoming Highway Department to recommission Wyoming Highway 14 as Alternate US 14.

== Major intersections ==
The entire route is in Albany County.

Location	mi	km	Destinations	Notes
	0.00	0.00	Laramie Regional Airport	Southern terminus
	0.36	0.58	WYO 130	Northern terminus
1.000 mi = 1.609 km; 1.000 km = 0.621 mi
