= Wyoming Highway 12 =

Highway in Wyoming

Wyoming Highway 12
- Herrick Lane
- WYO 12 highlighted in red

Route information
- Maintained by WYDOT
- Length: 12.18 mi (19.60 km)

Major junctions
- West end: CR 57 near Laramie
- I-80 near Laramie
- East end: WYO 130 near Laramie

Location
- Country: United States
- State: Wyoming
- Counties: Albany

Highway system
- Wyoming State Highway System; Interstate; US; State
← US 12	→ WYO 13

Wyoming Highway 12 (WYO 12) is a 12.18-mile-long (19.60 km) Wyoming state highway known as Herrick Lane in Albany County west of Laramie.

== Route description ==
Wyoming Highway 12 travels from Wyoming Highway 130, five miles (8 km) west of Laramie near the Laramie Regional Airport west to an intersection with Albany County Route 57 (Mandel Lane) just past the junction with Interstate 80 (Exit 297). From there WYO 12 becomes Albany County Route 57 (Dutton Creek Road). Further west, CR 57 connects with I-80 again at Exit 290 (Quealy Dome) by the way of Albany CR 59 (Hunt Road), and at Exit 279 at the end of Dutton Creek Road. Mileposts along Highway 12 increase from east to west.

== Major intersections ==
The entire route is in Albany County.

Location	mi	km	Destinations	Notes
	0.00	0.00	CR 57 (Mandel Lane)	Western terminus
	4.02	6.47	I-80 – Laramie, Rawlins	Exit 297 on I-80
	12.18	19.60	WYO 130	Eastern terminus
1.000 mi = 1.609 km; 1.000 km = 0.621 mi
