= Great Divide Basin =

Endorheic basin adjoining the Continental Divide in Wyoming, United States

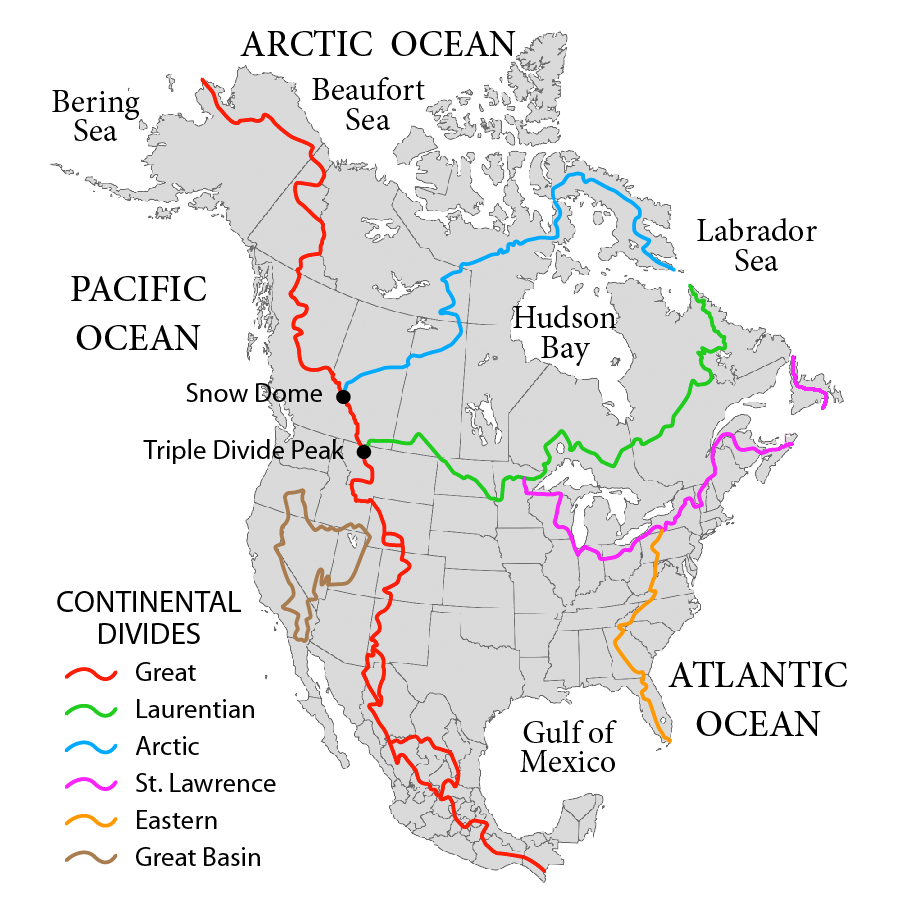
- The Great Divide Basin (the red loop in southern Wyoming on the map above) is an endorheic drainage basin on the Continental Divide (red line) in the United States.
- Floor elevation: 6,500 ft (2,000 m)
- Area: 3,959 sq mi (10,250 km^{2})

Geography
- Country: United States
- State: Wyoming
- Region: Red Desert
- Coordinates: 42°00′01″N 107°59′02″W
- Interactive map of Great Divide Basin

The Great Divide Basin or Great Divide Closed Basin is an area of land in the Red Desert of Wyoming where none of the water falling as rain to the ground drains into any ocean, directly or indirectly. It is thus an endorheic basin, one of several in North America that adjoin the Continental Divide. To the south and west of the basin is the Green River watershed, draining into the Pacific Ocean by way of the Gulf of California; to the north and east is the North Platte watershed, draining to the Gulf of Mexico. The basin is very roughly rectangular in shape; the northwest corner is at Oregon Buttes near South Pass, about 40 miles (64 km) southwest of Lander, and the southeast corner is in the Sierra Madre Range near Bridger Pass, about 20 miles (32 km) southwest of Rawlins.

== History ==
Although the Great Divide Basin provides a relatively low and easy crossing of the Continental Divide, its aridity and endorheic nature were an obstacle to pioneers during the westward expansion of the United States; it was known as the Saline Plain around the 1870s. Consequently, the Oregon Trail detoured north over South Pass, and the Overland Trail detoured south over Bridger Pass. In contrast, during the construction of the first transcontinental railroad, the Union Pacific was laid directly across the southern part of the basin. (The original railroad map labeled one point along this route as Bridgers Pass, giving rise to the still-common misconception that the railroad followed the Overland Trail.) Roughly the same route across the basin was later taken by the transcontinental highways traversing the region, namely the Lincoln Highway, U.S. 30, and Interstate 80. The basin is also traversed in a north–south direction by U.S. 287 and Wyoming 789. Even today the basin is very sparsely populated, the only incorporated town being Wamsutter, with a population of 203 at the 2020 census.

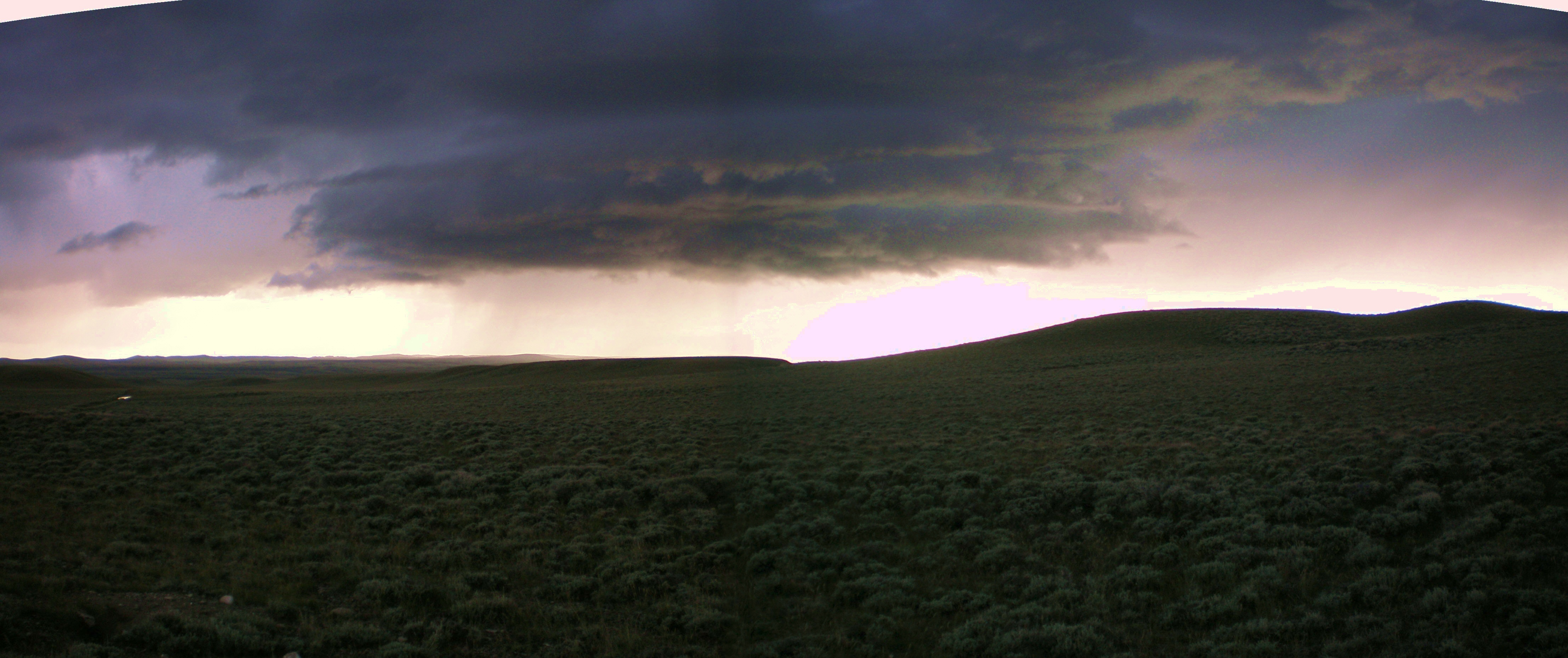
Thunderstorm over the Great Divide Basin

A westward traveler on Interstate 80 crosses from the Gulf of Mexico drainage to the Great Divide Basin at about 41.788°N 107.376°W, roughly 7 miles west of Rawlins. A highway sign marks this as a crossing of the Continental Divide, although that is a matter of interpretation. At about 41.716°N 107.782°W is the exit for Continental Divide Road, the highest point on I-80 within the Great Divide Basin, at an elevation of 7,130 ft (2,170 m). While this is no longer recognized as a crossing of the Divide, it was evidently considered to be just that during the days of the Lincoln Highway and U.S. 30, and a monument to Henry B. Joy, the first president of the Lincoln Highway Association, was placed just south of this point along the old highway. (It was relocated to Sherman Summit in 2001 to protect it from increasing vandalism.) Further west, I-80 crosses to the Colorado River drainage at about 41.631°N 108.311°W. This is now recognized as the true location of the Continental Divide; however, the corresponding highway sign is located at the Tipton interchange, about 2.6 miles to the east at 41.634°N 108.261°W, but with a posted elevation appropriate to the correct location. In any case, the placement of the Divide on the west rim of the basin signifies that this otherwise endorheic region would drain to the east if it were to overflow. After leaving the Great Divide Basin behind, I-80 continues west and at 41.275°N 110.802°W, around 10 miles (16 km) east of Evanston, enters the vastly larger Great Basin, staying within it until the crest of the Sierra Nevada at Donner Summit.

== Geology ==
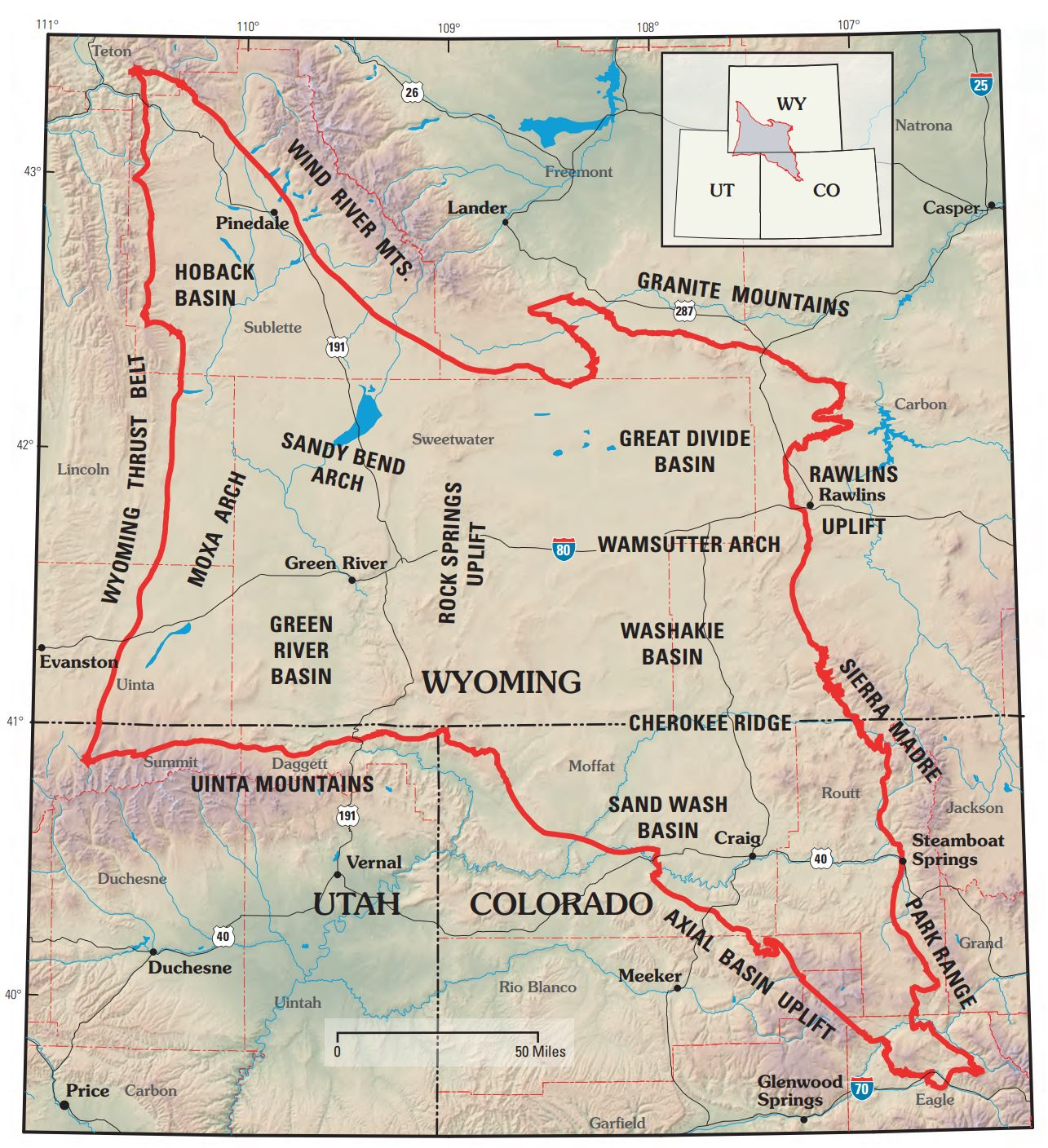
Greater Green River Basin, comprising Great Divide Basin, Green River Basin, Washakie Basin and Sand Wash Basin.

The Great Divide Basin is part of the Greater Green River Basin, separated from the Green River Basin by the Rock Springs Uplift during Late Cretaceous into the Early Eocene.

== Geography ==
While usually thought of as a single basin, the Great Divide Basin actually consists of several contiguous sub-basins, most notably those centered on Circle Bar Lake, Frewen Lake, Lost Creek Lake, Red Lake, and Separation Lake. The interior ridges separating these sub-basins have led to disagreement about the correct path of the Continental Divide across or around the basin.

The Lucite Hills form part of the western boundary of the basin, featuring Black Rock Butte and Emmons Cone. Alkali Flat and Greasewood Flat are directly to their northeast. Sand dunes lie in the central western part of the basin. In the southern part of the western basin, Red Desert Flat and Red Desert Basin are the major features. These are about 25 miles (40 km) northwest of the town of Wamsutter. In the northeast part of the Great Divide Basin is Chain Lakes Flat, southwest and downslope from Bairoil and Lamont.

The basin is a high desert dominated by sand dunes, bluffs and alkali flats. Flora and fauna include small trees in some ravines and the occasional shrub, along with many birds and pronghorn, mule deer, feral horses, and a desert elk herd. The basin includes uranium ore deposits and many oil and natural gas wells. There has been debate between those who wish to exploit the resources within the basin and those who wish to see at least parts of it officially designated as wilderness.

== In popular culture ==
The British author Arthur Conan Doyle described a romanticized version of the Great Divide Basin, which the novel called the Great Alkali Plain, in his Sherlock Holmes work A Study in Scarlet (1887).

In Jules Verne’s Around the World in Eighty Days (1873), Phileas Fogg and his companions ride the new transcontinental railroad across the American West and thus presumably across the Great Divide Basin. However, the book has them crossing the Continental Divide at Bridger Pass, 7524 feet above sea level, which was actually on the Overland Trail and not the railroad. This is a prominent example of the confusion mentioned above.
