= Togwotee Pass =

Mountain pass in Absaroka Range, in Teton County, Wyoming, United States

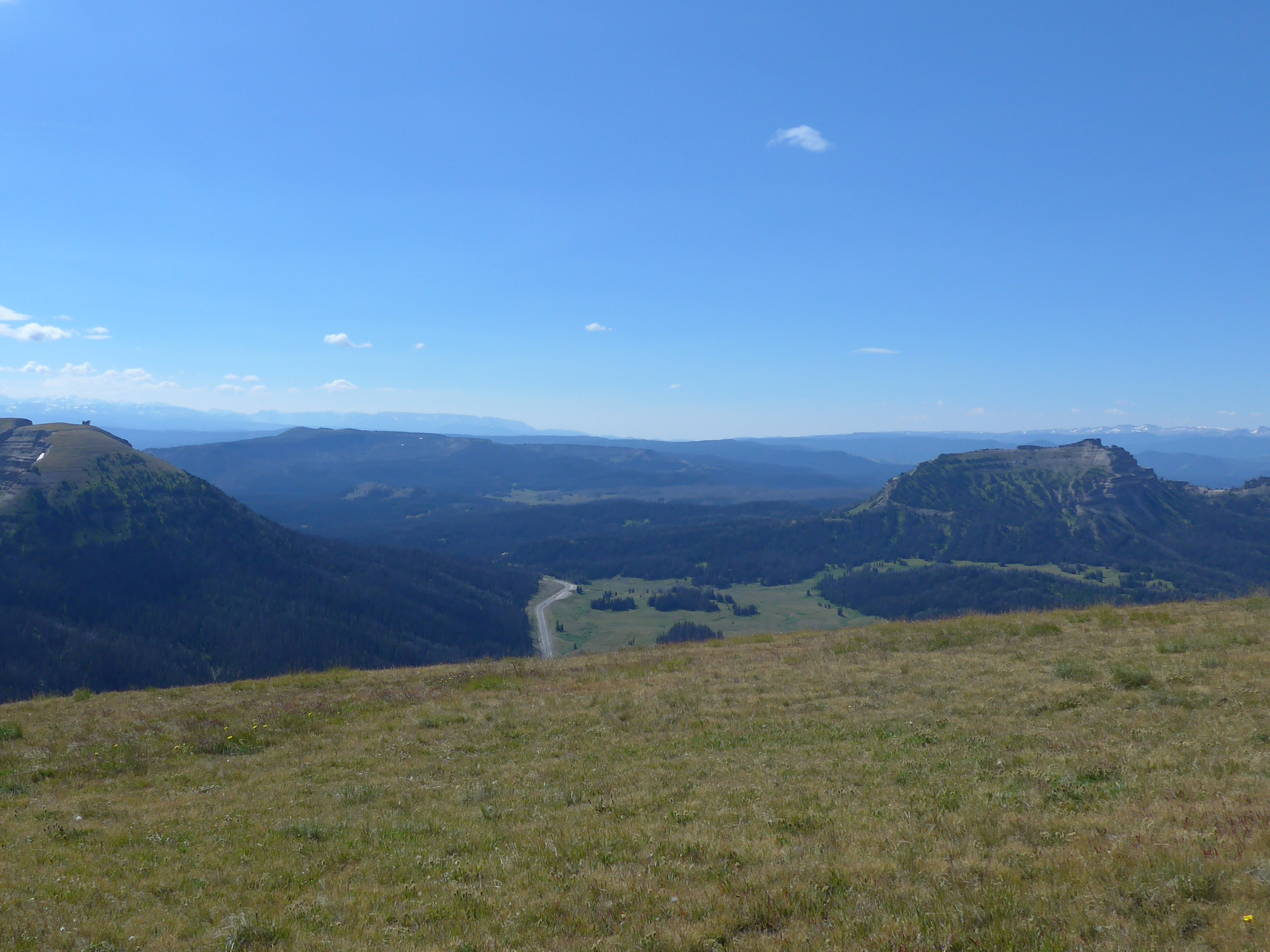
- Togwotee Pass from north, from Breccia Peak, Two Oceans Mountain on the right

- Location within the United States Location within Wyoming
- Elevation: 9,658 ft (2,944 m)
- Traversed by: US 287 / US 26

Location
- Location: Teton County, Wyoming, U.S.
- Range: Absaroka Range
- Coordinates: 43°45′00″N 110°04′48″W

Togwotee Pass (pronounced TOH-guh-tee) is a high mountain pass in the western United States, at an elevation of 9,655 feet (2,943 m) above sea level. On the Continental Divide in the Absaroka Range of northwestern Wyoming in Teton County, it is between Dubois and Moran Junction in the Jackson Hole valley.

== Description ==
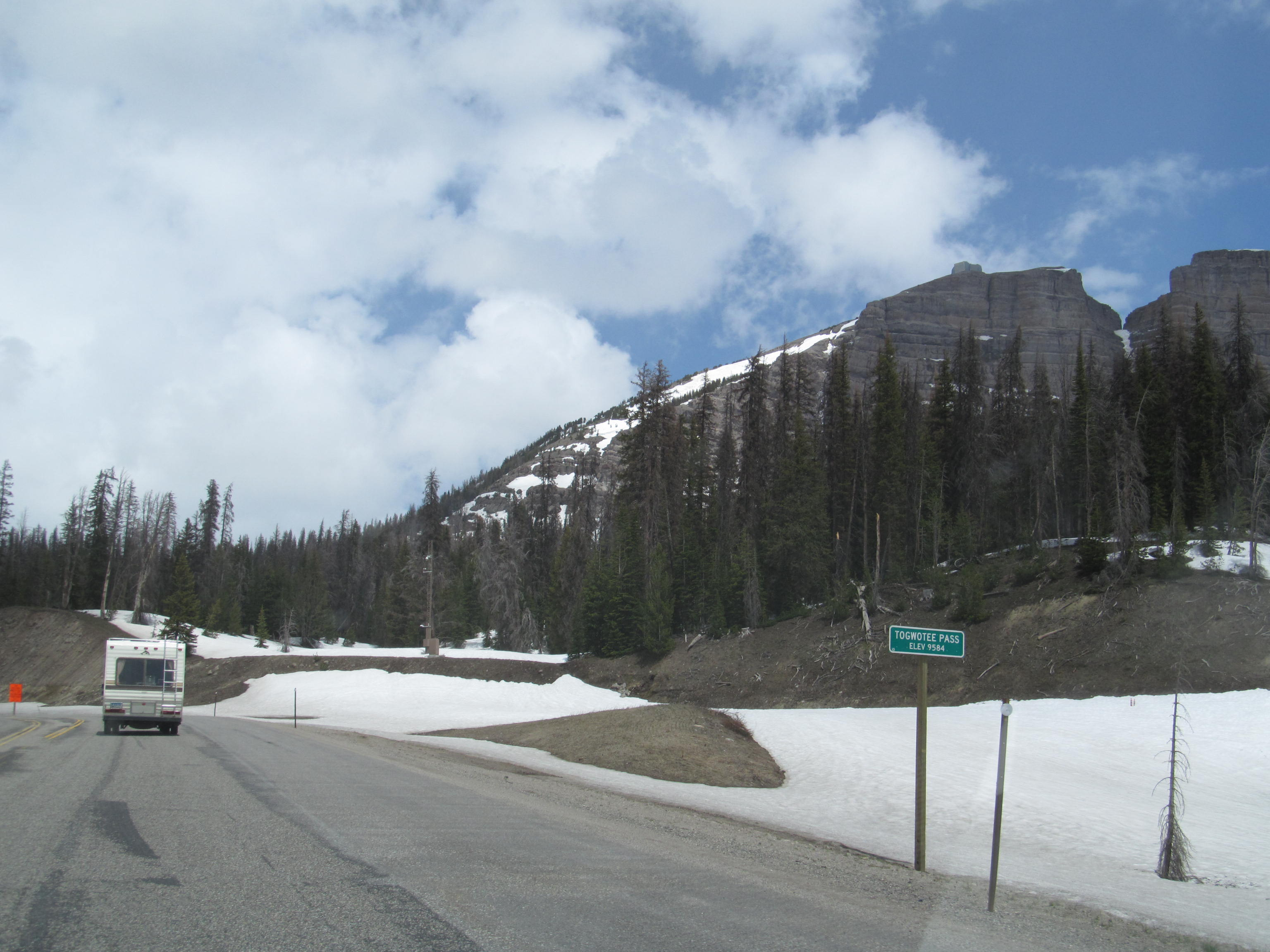
Elevation sign along westbound US 26 / US 287, June 2014

U.S. Route 287 and U.S Route 26 traverse the pass, which is approximately 25 miles (40 km) east of Moran Junction. The pass provides the most direct access to Grand Teton National Park from eastern Wyoming. Located between Two Ocean Mountain and Breccia Peak, sweeping vistas of the Teton Range are visible from the western slopes of the pass. A ski run (mainly a traverse) at the Jackson Hole ski resort is also named Togwotee Pass.

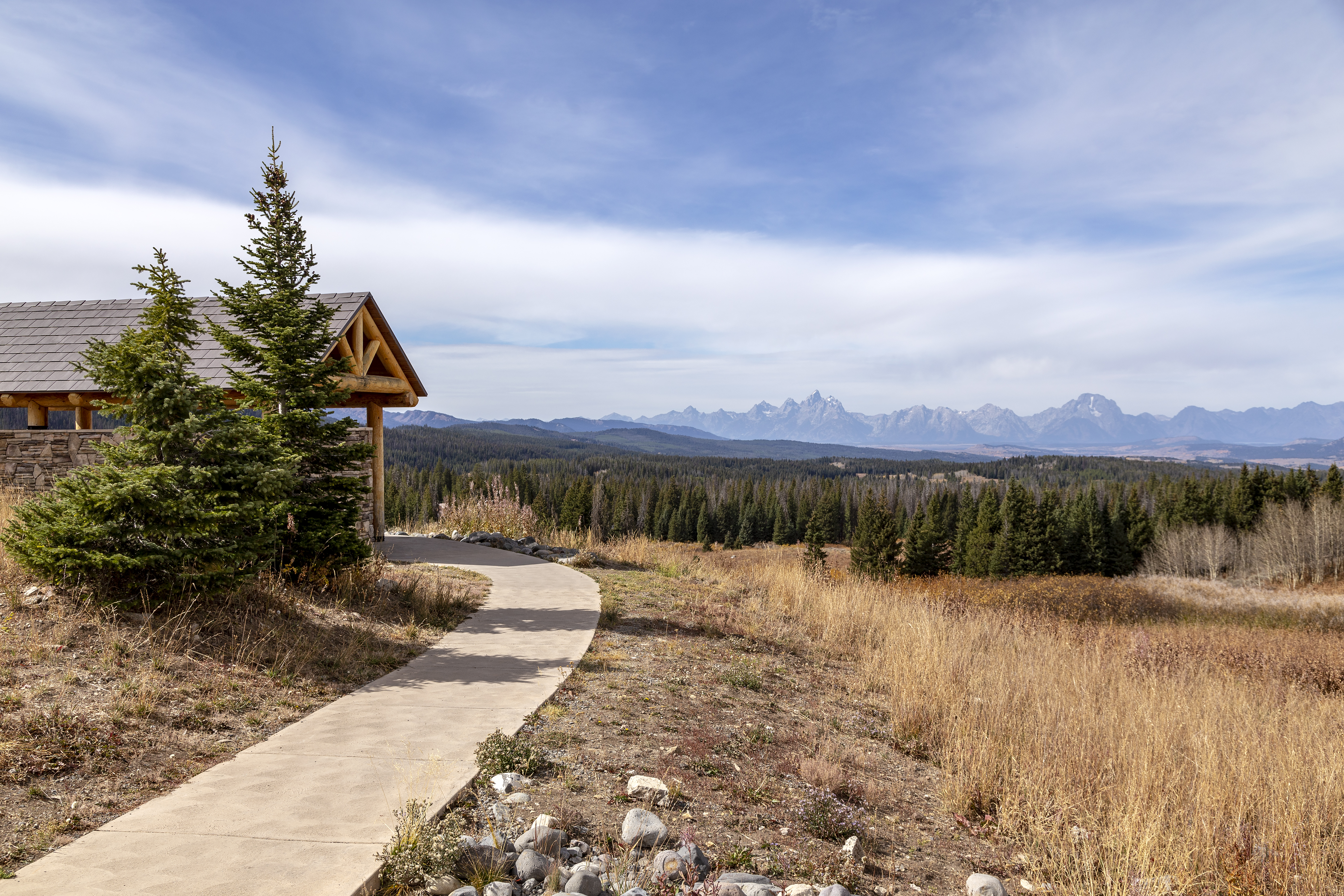
The view of the Teton Range, looking west from Togwotee Pass

Located in the Bridger-Teton National Forest and adjacent to Shoshone National Forest, the pass receives heavy winter snowfall and is a top destination for snowmobiling, backcountry skiing and cross-country skiing. Annual snowfall at the pass often exceeds 25 feet (7.6 m) (reports of over fifty feet (15 m) of snow are also known) in any given winter and the road can be shut down for days at a time during blizzards. The Continental Divide Snowmobile Trail passes through the immediate area.

== History ==
The pass is named for Togwotee, a subchief under Chief Washakie of the Sheepeater tribe, a branch of the Shoshones. Togwotee led The Jones Expedition over this pass in 1873. Before the expedition, the pass was reported to be an important trade route for native tribes.

== Climate ==
According to the Köppen Climate Classification system, Togwotee Pass has a dry-summer subarctic climate, abbreviated "Dsc" on climate maps. The hottest temperature recorded at Togwotee Pass was 81 °F (27.2 °C) on June 24, 1988, and July 13, 2002, while the coldest temperature recorded was −39 °F (−39.4 °C) on December 23, 1983.

Climate data for Togwotee Pass, Wyoming, 1991–2020 normals, extremes 1981–present
Month	Jan	Feb	Mar	Apr	May	Jun	Jul	Aug	Sep	Oct	Nov	Dec	Year
Record high °F (°C)	53 (12)	50 (10)	57 (14)	66 (19)	72 (22)	81 (27)	81 (27)	79 (26)	76 (24)	67 (19)	56 (13)	46 (8)	81 (27)
Mean maximum °F (°C)	39.4 (4.1)	39.8 (4.3)	47.4 (8.6)	55.9 (13.3)	63.4 (17.4)	70.7 (21.5)	74.8 (23.8)	73.5 (23.1)	68.1 (20.1)	58.6 (14.8)	46.6 (8.1)	37.8 (3.2)	75.5 (24.2)
Mean daily maximum °F (°C)	24.0 (−4.4)	25.9 (−3.4)	33.5 (0.8)	39.8 (4.3)	49.0 (9.4)	57.4 (14.1)	66.1 (18.9)	64.7 (18.2)	55.0 (12.8)	41.8 (5.4)	29.9 (−1.2)	22.7 (−5.2)	42.5 (5.8)
Daily mean °F (°C)	16.3 (−8.7)	17.0 (−8.3)	23.4 (−4.8)	29.0 (−1.7)	38.1 (3.4)	45.9 (7.7)	54.0 (12.2)	52.9 (11.6)	44.6 (7.0)	32.9 (0.5)	21.9 (−5.6)	15.3 (−9.3)	32.6 (0.3)
Mean daily minimum °F (°C)	8.6 (−13.0)	8.1 (−13.3)	13.2 (−10.4)	18.1 (−7.7)	27.1 (−2.7)	34.4 (1.3)	41.9 (5.5)	41.0 (5.0)	34.1 (1.2)	24.0 (−4.4)	13.9 (−10.1)	7.8 (−13.4)	22.7 (−5.2)
Mean minimum °F (°C)	−10.8 (−23.8)	−10.5 (−23.6)	−4.3 (−20.2)	2.3 (−16.5)	12.0 (−11.1)	23.9 (−4.5)	33.7 (0.9)	31.8 (−0.1)	20.8 (−6.2)	6.1 (−14.4)	−5.0 (−20.6)	−11.9 (−24.4)	−18.6 (−28.1)
Record low °F (°C)	−33 (−36)	−33 (−36)	−23 (−31)	−19 (−28)	−10 (−23)	11 (−12)	13 (−11)	12 (−11)	0 (−18)	−16 (−27)	−22 (−30)	−39 (−39)	−39 (−39)
Average precipitation inches (mm)	4.39 (112)	4.07 (103)	4.02 (102)	4.20 (107)	3.54 (90)	2.42 (61)	1.32 (34)	1.29 (33)	2.32 (59)	3.09 (78)	4.34 (110)	4.55 (116)	39.55 (1,005)
Average extreme snow depth inches (cm)	62.2 (158)	73.7 (187)	81.2 (206)	83.0 (211)	74.2 (188)	43.0 (109)	4.4 (11)	0.0 (0.0)	2.5 (6.4)	14.4 (37)	32.7 (83)	49.6 (126)	85.9 (218)
Average precipitation days (≥ 0.01 in)	16.9	16.0	17.4	17.6	13.9	8.7	5.9	6.3	8.6	12.4	16.2	16.5	156.4
Source 1: NOAA
Source 2: National Weather Service
