= Lamont, Wyoming =

Unincorporated Community in Wyoming, United States

- Location within Wyoming
- Coordinates: 42.2205125°N 107.4770106°W
- Country: United States
- State: Wyoming
- County: Carbon
- Elevation: 6,624 ft (2,019 m)

Population (2000)
  - Total: 3
- Time zone: UTC-7 (Mountain (MST))
  - Summer (DST): UTC-6 (MDT)
- GNIS feature ID: 1590497

Lamont is a very small populated place in the northwest corner of Carbon County, Wyoming, United States. It lies on the northeast edge of the Great Divide Basin. Lamont is about 33 miles (53 km) north of Rawlins, Wyoming, along U.S. Route 287 (cosigned with Wyoming Highway 789). Lamont is also the eastern terminus of Wyoming Highway 73, which leads about 5 miles (8.0 km) west to the town of Bairoil.
