= Breccia Peak (Wyoming) =

Mountain in Wyoming, United States

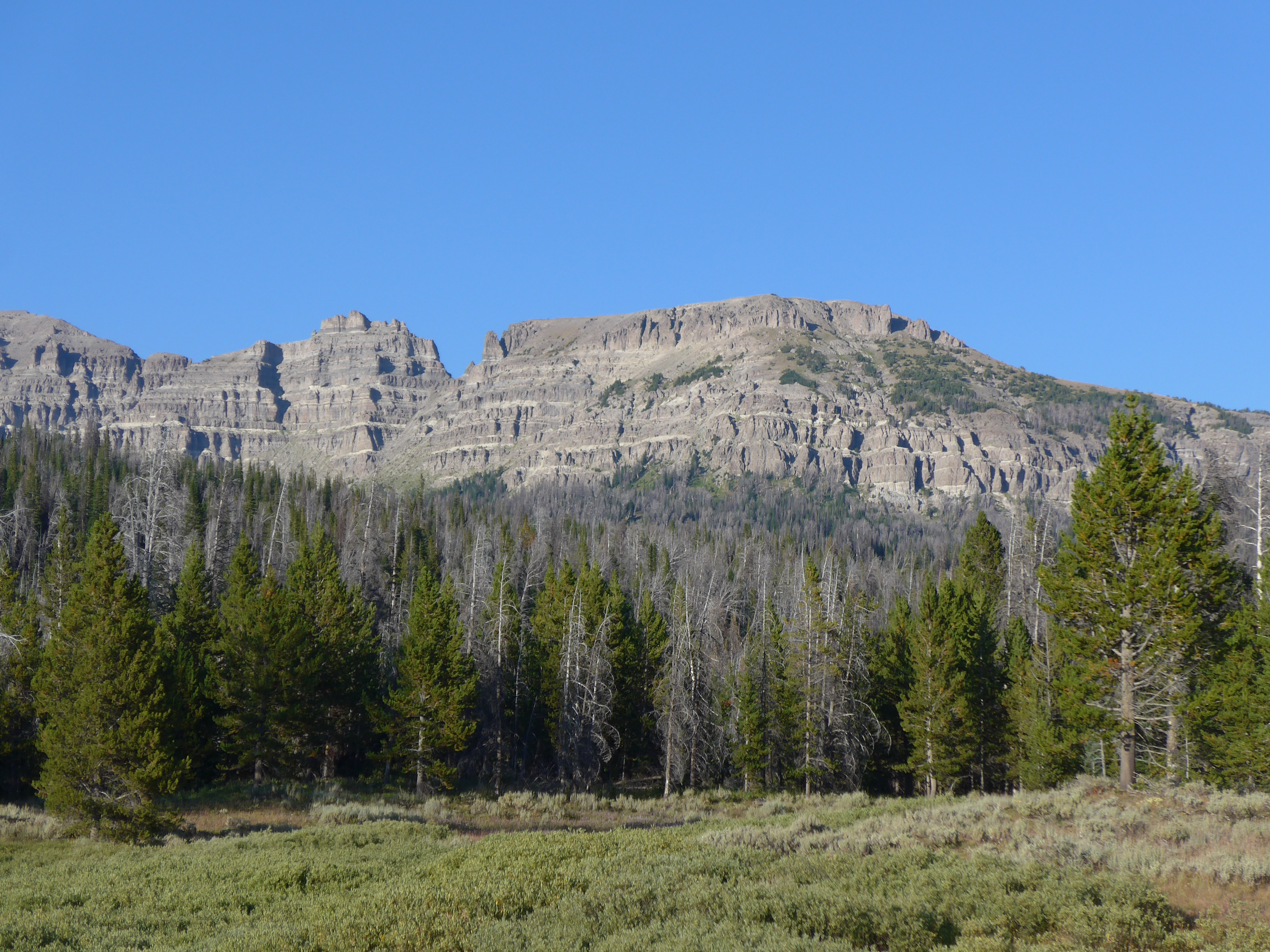
- Breccia Peak (middle) from southwest, from US 26/US 287

Highest point
- Elevation: 11,007 ft (3,355 m)
- Prominence: 200 ft (61 m)
- Parent peak: Buffalo Fork Peak
- Coordinates: 43°47′16″N 110°04′29″W

Geography
- Location within Wyoming
- Location: Teton County, Wyoming, United States
- Parent range: Absaroka Range, Rocky Mountains

Climbing
- Easiest route: Hike (YDS Class 2)

Breccia Peak is a mountain in the southern Absaroka Range of the Rocky Mountains. It is located in Teton County in the U.S. state of Wyoming, close to the southwest border of the Teton Wilderness within the Bridger-Teton National Forest.

== Geography ==
Breccia Peak is located about 2.5 miles (4.0 km) north of Togwotee Pass, part of the Great Continental Divide which connects Jackson Hole from the west to the Wind River valley in the east. The plateau-like summit contains the steep and rocky Breccia Cliffs on its west and north faces, while a mainly grassy face exists to the east and south.

Breccia Peak is the most prominent mountain in the immediate area, topping Buffalo Fork Peak to its north by about 200 feet (61 m). Higher peaks can be found along the Teton Range, located more than 30 miles (48 km) to the west.

About 1.25 miles (2.01 km) southwest of Breccia Peak lies Lost Lake, located at an elevation of about 9,500 feet (2,900 m). This is a small but very scenic lake where the Breccia Cliffs reflect off the water during certain times of day.

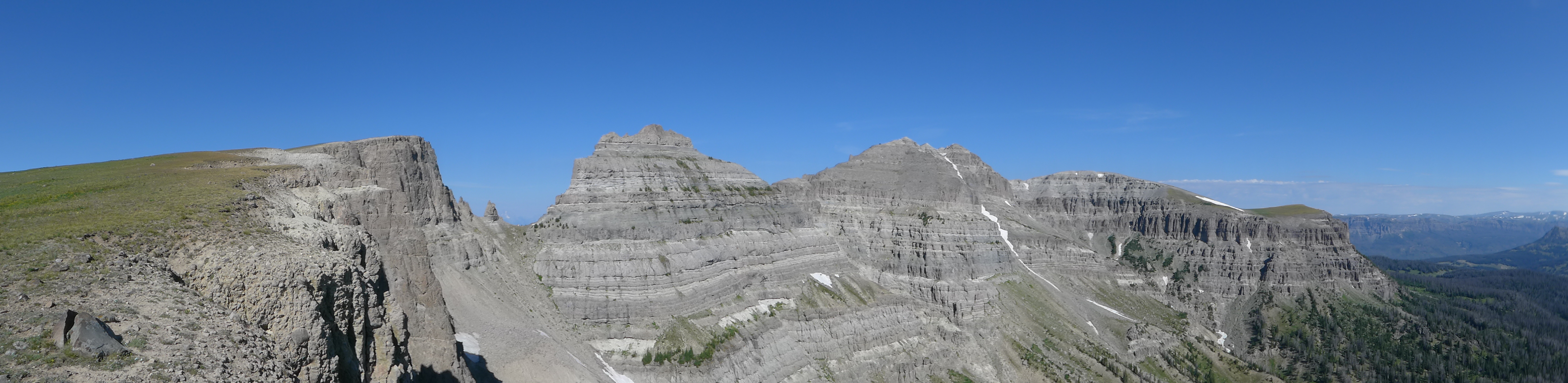
Breccia Peak (left) and Buffalo Fork Peak (right) from east ridge of Breccia Peak.

== Geology ==
Breccia Peak is made of volcanic Absaroka breccia, a form of rock composed of broken fragments of minerals cemented together, and from which the mountain takes its name. The rocks in the section of the summit belonging to the Wiggins Formation originated in the Upper Eocene epoch. The saddle between Breccia Peak and Angle Mountain contains an elongate irregular intrusive body of glassy flow-banded rhyodacite porphyry showing minor wall-rock alteration.

== Climbing ==
Breccia Peak is a popular and accessible summit for hikers and climbers in the Yellowstone Region, as it is typically reachable within two hours from the trailhead near U.S. Highway 26/U.S. Highway 287, approximately 0.6 miles (0.97 km) north of Togwotee Pass. Visitors will encounter a challenging but minimally dangerous path (YDS Class 2, Swiss Alpine Club hiking grade T3). A well-established but unofficial trail leads from the trailhead to the treeline, and early on there is a fork that leads to Breccia Peak (left) or Sublette Peak (right).

At an elevation of 10,000 feet (3,000 m), climbers will find a vast meadow southeast of Breccia Peak where they can see the southeast face of the mountain entirely. To climb, the easiest route involves traversing the southeast face to reach the east ridge, avoiding a steep rocky cliff in the middle. From there, climbers can follow the east ridge to the summit. An alternative is to traverse the southwest face to the south ridge of Breccia Peak, and then follow this ridge to the summit.

The southeast face of the mountain above the treeline is particularly suitable for backcountry skiing. The runs are short but quite varied.

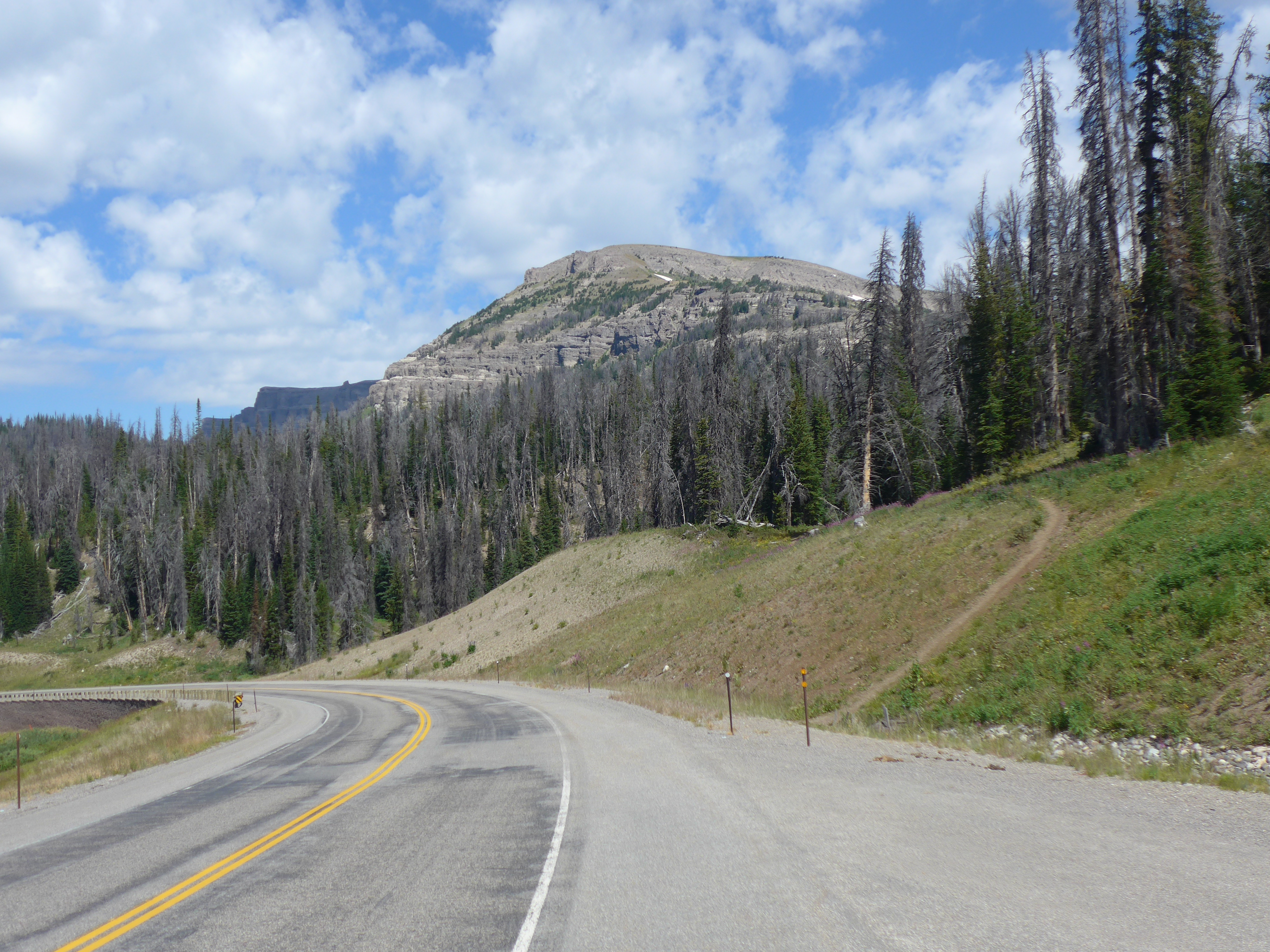
Breccia Peak from the pullout 0.6 miles north of Togwotee Pass, in the front the start of the track.

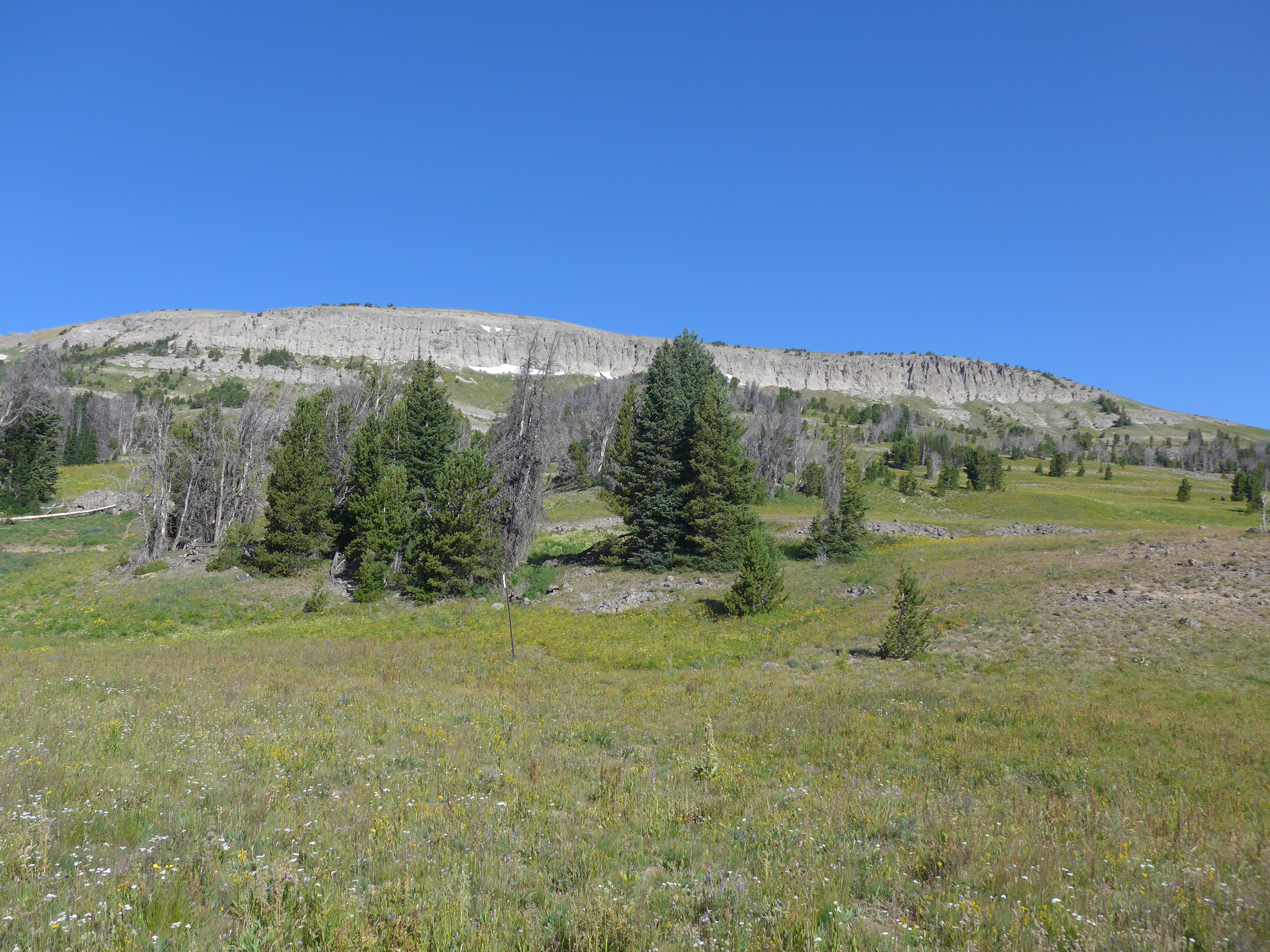
Breccia Peak from southeast while ascending on normal route. The steep cliff in the middle can be passed on the left or on the right.

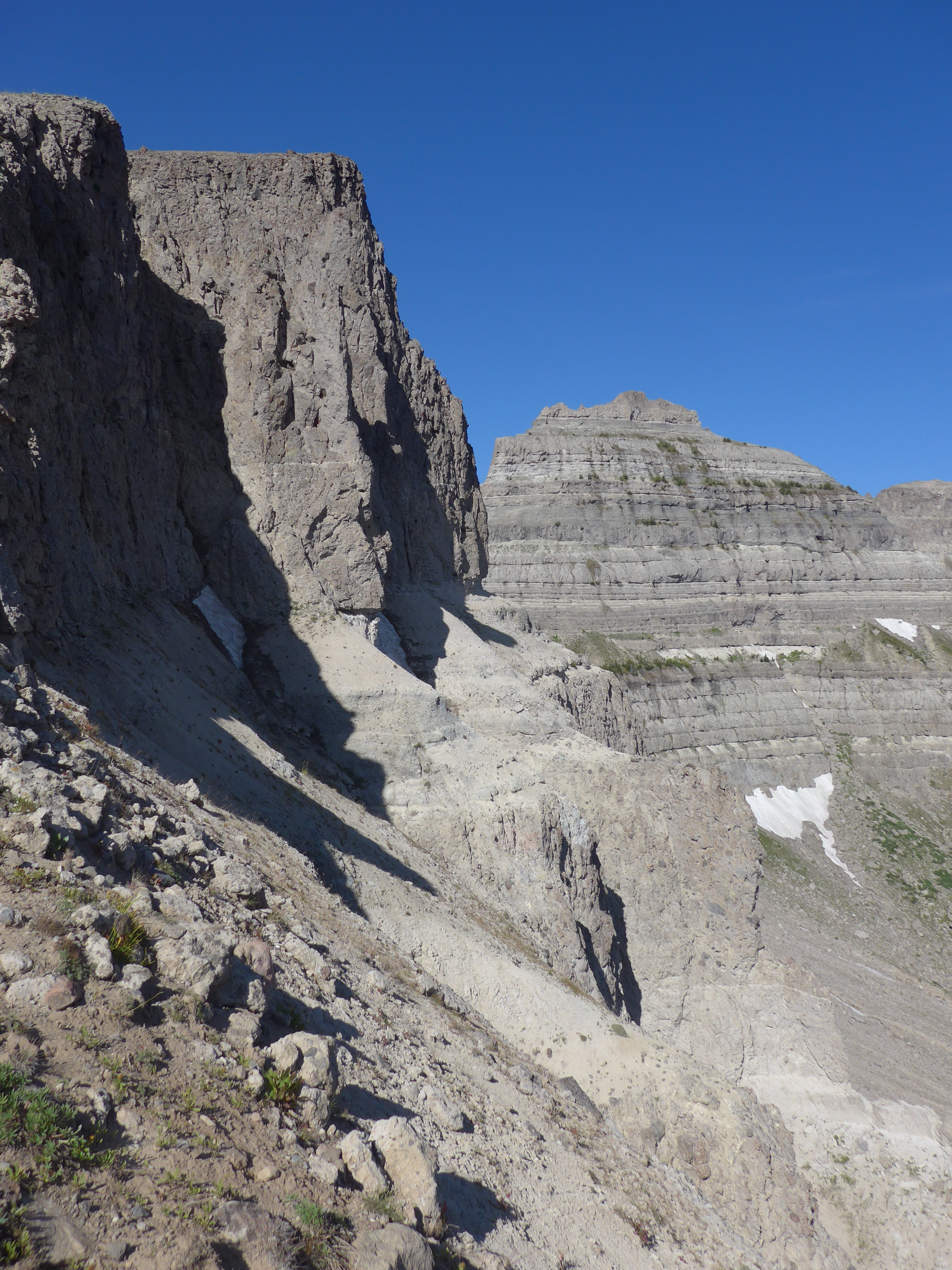
Northern cliffs of Breccia Peak.

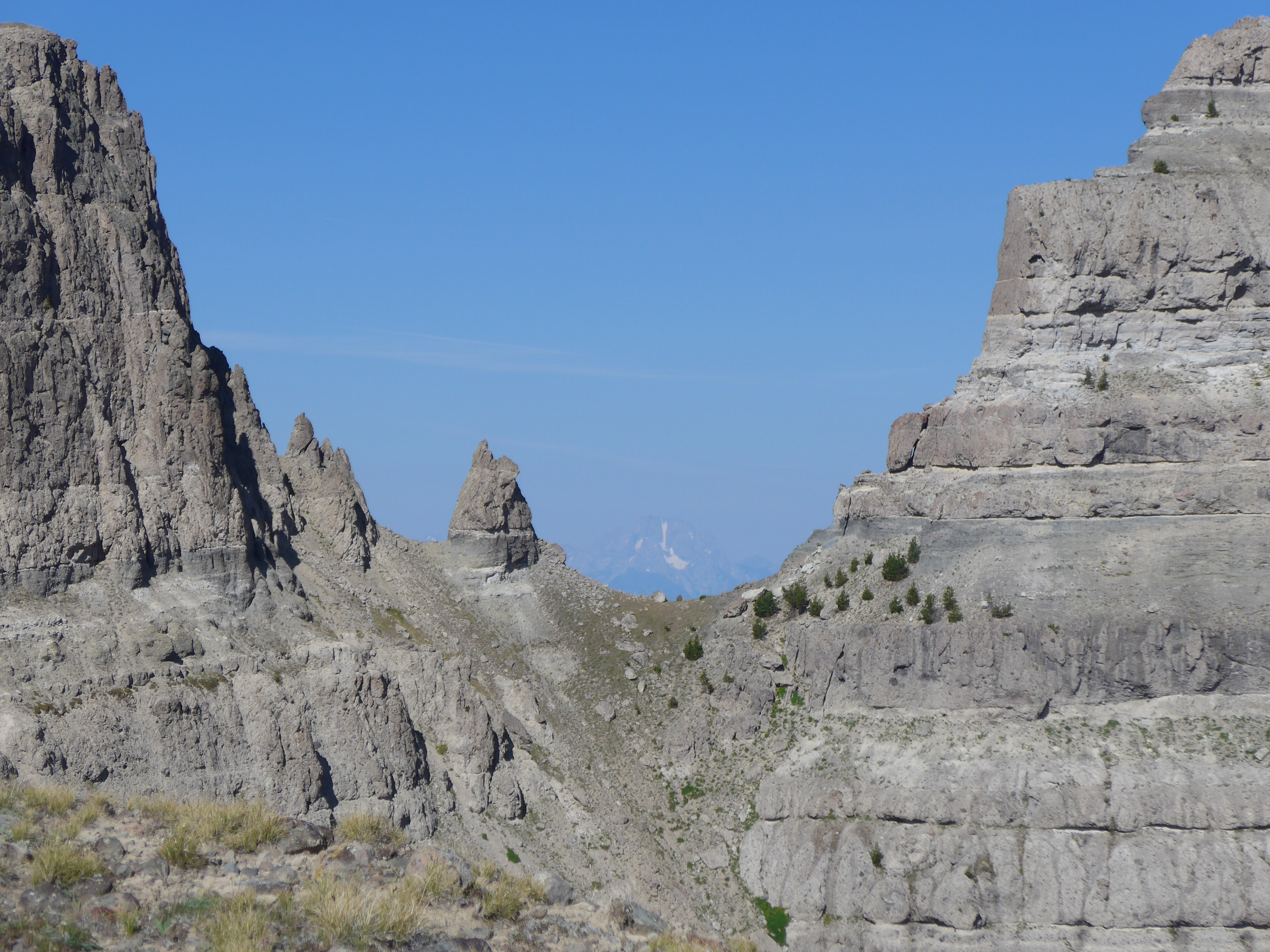
First col between Breccia Peak (left) and Buffalo Fork Peak, Mount Moran in background.

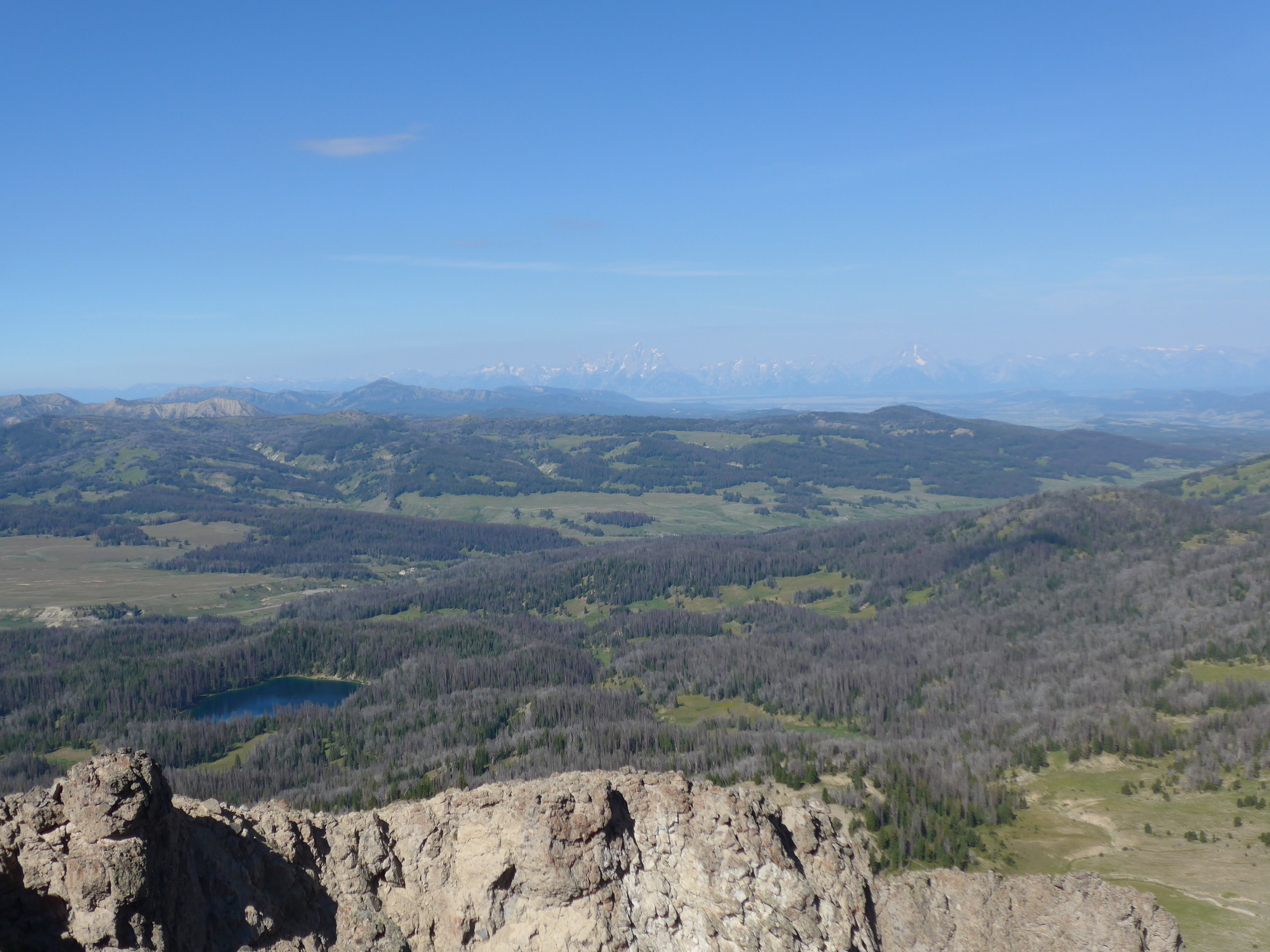
View from Breccia Peak to west, to Teton Range, Lost Lake in the foreground.

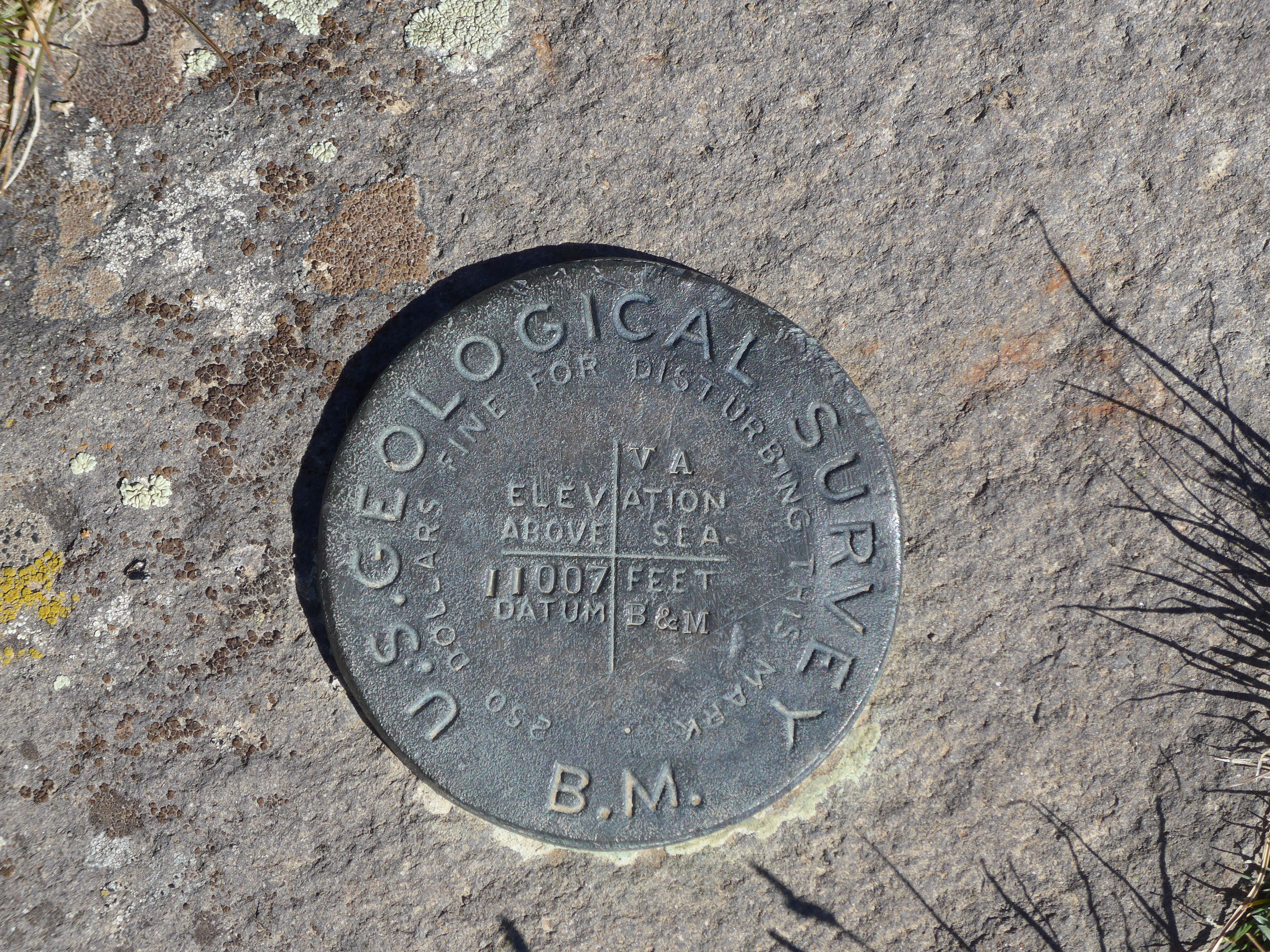
Survey marker at the summit of Breccia Peak.
