= Wyoming Highway 74 =

State highway in Wyoming, United States

- Bridge Avenue
- WYO 74 highlighted in red

Route information
- Maintained by WYDOT
- Length: 0.218 mi (351 m) 0.128 miles (206 m) maintained by WYDOT

Major junctions
- West end: WYO 130 in Saratoga
- East end: East River Street in Saratoga

Location
- Country: United States
- State: Wyoming
- Counties: Carbon

Highway system
- Wyoming State Highway System; Interstate; US; State
← WYO 73	→ WYO 76

Wyoming Highway 74 (WYO 74) is a short unsigned Wyoming state highway known as Bridge Avenue in the town of Saratoga. It is 0.13 miles (0.21 km) in length.

== Route description ==
WYO 74 begins at Highway 130, locally known as 1st Street. It proceeds east as Bridge Avenue, with the first block not maintained by WYDOT, but locally. However, the approaches and the bridge over the North Platte River are maintained by WYDOT. Highway 74 then terminates at East River Street.

== History ==
Wyoming Highway 74 was once part of Wyoming Highway 130 between Saratoga and Ryan Park, before that designation was moved south to its present-day routing.

== Major intersections ==
The entire route is in Saratoga, Carbon County.

mi	km	Destinations	Notes
0.000	0.000	First Street (WYO 130)	Western terminus; road continues as Bridge Avenue
0.09	0.14	River Street	Begin state maintenance
0.15	0.24	Bridge over North Platte River	
0.218	0.351	East River Street	Eastern terminus; road continues as Bridge Avenue
1.000 mi = 1.609 km; 1.000 km = 0.621 mi
