= Jones Expedition of 1873 =

Exploration of Yellowstone Northwestern Wyoming

A map showing the route of the Jones Expedition published with the report in 1875.

The Jones Expedition of 1873 was a survey completed during the summer of 1873 with the official purpose of finding a wagon route between the Union Pacific Railroad in the southern part of the Wyoming Territory and Yellowstone National Park.

Captain William A. Jones led the expedition which included prominent scientists of the era, botanist Charles Parry and geologist Theodore Comstock as well chemists, topographers, astronomers, army infantry, eight wagons and 66 mules. The expedition was successful in discovering and documenting many features of western Wyoming including Togwotee Pass

== Overview ==
The expedition began on June 12, 1873 at Fort Bridger.
