= Wyoming Highway 73 =

State highway in Wyoming, United States

Wyoming Highway 73
- Bairoil Road
- WYO 73 highlighted in red

Route information
- Maintained by WYDOT
- Length: 4.64 mi (7.47 km)

Major junctions
- West end: Antelope Drive in Bairoil
- East end: US 287 / WYO 789 in Lamont

Location
- Country: United States
- State: Wyoming
- Counties: Carbon, Sweetwater

Highway system
- Wyoming State Highway System; Interstate; US; State
| ← WYO 72 | → WYO 74 |

Wyoming Highway 73 (WYO 73) is a 4.64-mile (7.47 km) long east–west Wyoming state highway that runs from northwestern Carbon County to northeastern Sweetwater County. Highway 73 provides access to the town of Bairoil.

== Route description ==
Wyoming Highway 73 begins its west end at the city limits for Bairoil, in Sweetwater County, just east of an intersection with Bairoil Dr. From there Highway 73 travels east into Carbon County and terminates at U.S. Route 287 and Highway 789 in Lamont.

== Major intersections ==
| County | Location | mi | km | Destinations | Notes |
|---|---|---|---|---|---|
| Sweetwater | Bairoil | 0.00 | 0.00 | Antelope Drive | Western terminus |
| Carbon | Lamont | 4.64 | 7.47 | US 287 / WYO 789 | Eastern terminus |
1.000 mi = 1.609 km; 1.000 km = 0.621 mi
