= Rock Creek (Medicine Bow River tributary) =

River in Carbon and Albany counties in Wyoming, United States

Location
- Country: United States
- State: Wyoming
- Counties: Carbon and Albany
- Communities: Arlington, McFadden, Rock River

Physical characteristics
- Source
  - location: Snowy Range, Carbon County
  - coordinates: 41°24′15″N 106°12′9″W
- Mouth: Medicine Bow River
  - location: Carbon County
  - coordinates: 41°54′17″N 106°8′38″W
  - elevation: 6,535 ft (1,992 m)
- Length: 125 mi (201 km)
- Discharge
  - average: 80 cu ft/s (2.3 m^{3}/s)
  - minimum: 9.8 cu ft/s (0.28 m^{3}/s)
  - maximum: 469 cu ft/s (13.3 m^{3}/s)

Basin features
- Progression: Medicine Bow River, North Platte River, Platte River, Missouri River, Mississippi River

Rock Creek is a 125-mile-long (201 km) river in Carbon and Albany counties in Wyoming, United States, that is a tributary of the Medicine Bow River.

== Description ==
The drainage basin of Rock Creek starts high on the north side of the Snowy Range. At the northern base of the range, Rock Creek runs through the census-designated place of Arlington and continues on through the unincorporated community of McFadden and the town of Rock River. From there, Rock Creek runs primarily northeasterly before turning to the northwest and meeting with the Medicine Bow River just north of the town of Medicine Bow.

== See also ==
- List of rivers of Wyoming
