= Wyoming Highway 11 =

Highway in Wyoming

Wyoming Highway 11
- Albany Road
- WYO 11 highlighted in red

Route information
- Maintained by WYDOT
- Length: 10.94 mi (17.61 km)

Major junctions
- South end: Forest Route 500 in Albany
- North end: WYO 130 near Centennial

Location
- Country: United States
- State: Wyoming
- Counties: Albany

Highway system
- Wyoming State Highway System; Interstate; US; State
← WYO 10	→ US 12

Wyoming Highway 11 (WYO 11) is 10.94-mile-long (17.61 km) Wyoming state highway known as Albany Road in southwestern Albany County that provides access to Albany from Wyoming Highway 130.

== Route description ==
Wyoming Highway 11 begins its northern end at Wyoming Highway 130, 6 miles (9.7 km) east of Centennial, and travels southwest to Albany. Mileposts along Highway 11 increase from north to south, with the highway ending at 10.49 miles (16.88 km) and becoming National Forest Route 500 past Albany.

== Major intersections ==
The entire route is in Albany County.

Location	mi	km	Destinations	Notes
Albany	0.00	0.00	Forest Route 500 west	Southern terminus
	10.49	16.88	WYO 130 – Centennial, Laramie	Northern terminus
1.000 mi = 1.609 km; 1.000 km = 0.621 mi
