= Bairoil, Wyoming =

Town in Sweetwater County, Wyoming, United States

- Town
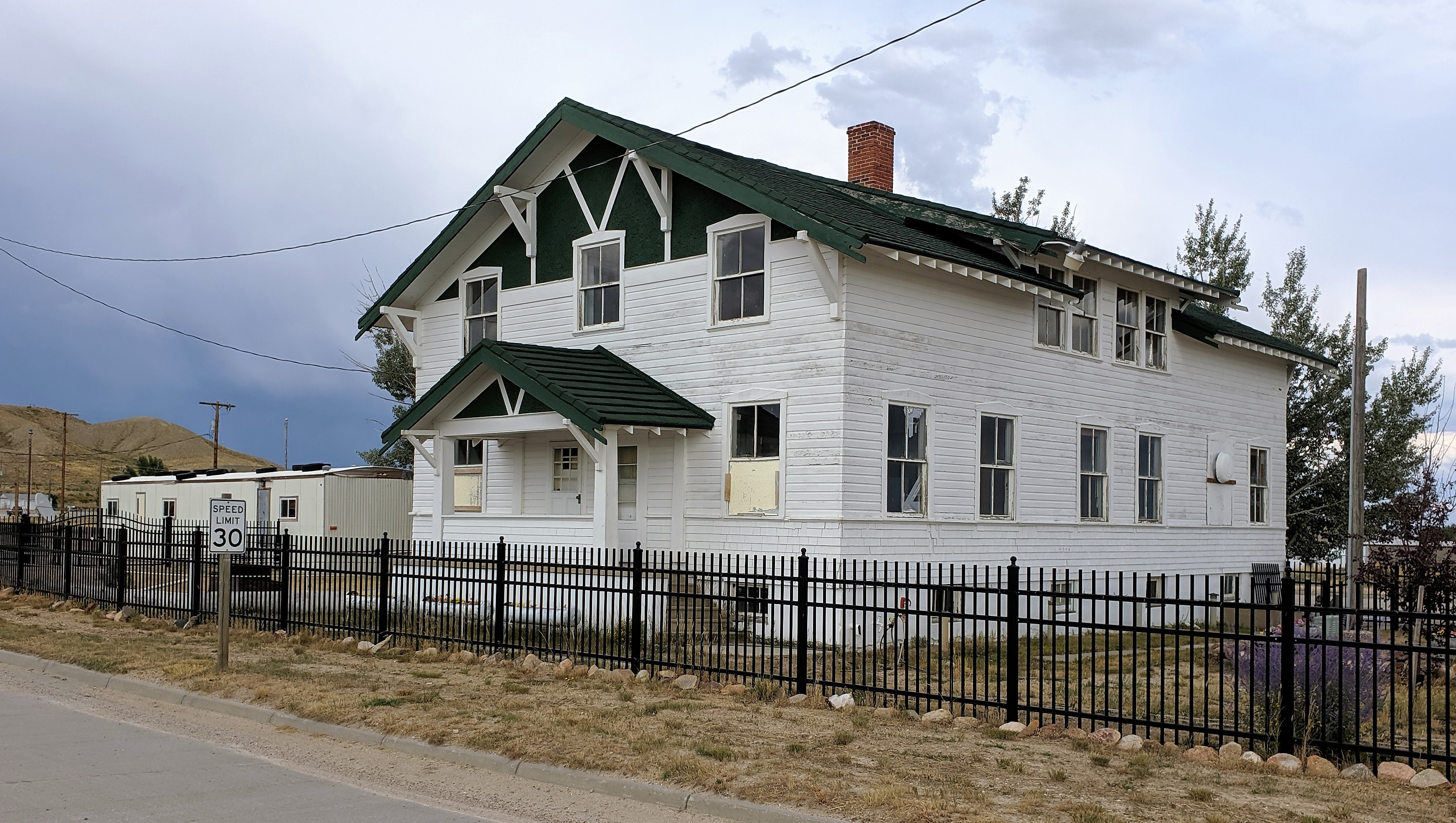
- Bairoil Town Hall

- Location of Bairoil in Sweetwater County, Wyoming
- Coordinates: 42°14′14″N 107°33′40″W
- Country: United States
- State: Wyoming
- County: Sweetwater

Area
  - Total: 1.41 sq mi (3.66 km^{2})
  - Land: 1.41 sq mi (3.66 km^{2})
  - Water: 0 sq mi (0.00 km^{2})
- Elevation: 6,857 ft (2,090 m)

Population (2020)
  - Total: 68
  - Density: 68.6/sq mi (26.49/km^{2})
- Time zone: UTC-7 (Mountain (MST))
  - Summer (DST): UTC-6 (MDT)
- ZIP code: 82322
- Area code: 307
- FIPS code: 56-04885
- GNIS feature ID: 2411661
- Website: www.townofbairoil.com

Bairoil is a town in northeastern Sweetwater County, Wyoming, United States. The population was 68 at the 2020 census.

It was incorporated in 1980.

== History ==
Bairoil was formed by former sheep rancher Charles M. Bair around 1916. Bair was the first to drill oil in this area and started the Bair Oil Company for which the town was named. The post office was established in 1924. A school was constructed in 1936. The town did not receive electricity until 1951 and phone service until 1970.

A hang-gliding world record was set in 1989 by Kevin Christopherson, who rode an updraft 287 miles (462 km) from Bairoil to North Dakota.

== Geography ==
According to the United States Census Bureau, the town has a total area of 1.41 square miles (3.65 km^{2}), all land.

Bairoil is located on the northeast edge of the Great Divide Basin.

Wyoming Highway 73 leads approximately 5 miles (8.0 km) east to Lamont.

=== Climate ===
According to the Köppen Climate Classification system, Bairoil has a semi-arid climate, abbreviated "BSk" on climate maps.

== Demographics ==
Historical population
Census	Pop.	Note	%±
1990	228		—
2000	97		−57.5%
2010	106		9.3%
2020	68		−35.8%
U.S. Decennial Census

=== 2010 census ===
As of the census of 2010, there were 106 people, 49 households, and 27 families residing in the town. The population density was 75.2 inhabitants per square mile (29.0/km^{2}). There were 68 housing units at an average density of 48.2 per square mile (18.6/km^{2}). The racial makeup of the town was 84.0% White, 1.9% Native American, 2.8% Asian, 7.5% from other races, and 3.8% from two or more races. Hispanic or Latino of any race were 21.7% of the population.

There were 49 households, of which 16.3% had children under the age of 18 living with them, 46.9% were married couples living together, 6.1% had a female householder with no husband present, 2.0% had a male householder with no wife present, and 44.9% were non-families. 36.7% of all households were made up of individuals, and 10.2% had someone living alone who was 65 years of age or older. The average household size was 2.16 and the average family size was 2.81.

The median age in the town was 49 years. 17% of residents were under the age of 18; 6.6% were between the ages of 18 and 24; 20.8% were from 25 to 44; 41.5% were from 45 to 64; and 14.2% were 65 years of age or older. The gender makeup of the town was 54.7% male and 45.3% female.

=== 2000 census ===
As of the census of 2000, there were 97 people, 42 households, and 30 families residing in the town. The population density was 109.0 people per square mile (42.1/km^{2}). There were 78 housing units at an average density of 87.7 per square mile (33.8/km^{2}). The racial makeup of the town was 100.00% White. Hispanic or Latino of any race were 4.12% of the population.

There were 42 households, out of which 23.8% had children under the age of 18 living with them, 64.3% were married couples living together, 7.1% had a female householder with no husband present, and 26.2% were non-families. 26.2% of all households were made up of individuals, and none had someone living alone who was 65 years of age or older. The average household size was 2.31 and the average family size was 2.74.

In the town, the population was spread out, with 19.6% under the age of 18, 8.2% from 18 to 24, 30.9% from 25 to 44, 33.0% from 45 to 64, and 8.2% who were 65 years of age or older. The median age was 41 years. For every 100 females there were 86.5 males. For every 100 females age 18 and over, there were 100.0 males.

The median income for a household in the town was $37,917, and the median income for a family was $31,875. Males had a median income of $38,125 versus $26,667 for females. The per capita income for the town was $20,030. There were 8.0% of families and 4.6% of the population living below the poverty line, including 11.1% of under eighteens and none of those over 64.

== Government ==
Bairoil has a mayor and town council. There are four council members. In 2026 Lowell Clawson was mayor.

== Education ==
Public education in the town of Bairoil is provided by Carbon County School District #1. Zoned campuses include Rawlins Elementary School (grades K-5), Rawlins Middle School (grades 6-8), and Rawlins High School (grades 9-12). In 2013 Bairoil Elementary was shut down by Carbon County School District Number 1 due to low enrollment.

Bairoil has a public library, a branch of the Sweetwater County Library System.

== See also ==
- List of municipalities in Wyoming
