= Breccia Peak (British Columbia) =

Mountain in British Columbia, Canada

Coordinates: 57°32′07″N 127°08′58″W

Breccia Peak is a mountain in north-central British Columbia, Canada.
