= Arlington, Wyoming =

Census-designated place in Carbon County, Wyoming, United States

- Census-designated place
- Location in Carbon County and the state of Wyoming.
- Coordinates: 41°35′41″N 106°12′30″W
- Country: United States
- State: Wyoming
- County: Carbon

Area
  - Total: 4.1 sq mi (10.5 km^{2})
  - Land: 4.1 sq mi (10.5 km^{2})
  - Water: 0 sq mi (0.0 km^{2})
- Elevation: 7,707 ft (2,349 m)

Population (2010)
  - Total: 25
  - Density: 6.2/sq mi (2.4/km^{2})
- Time zone: UTC-7 (Mountain (MST))
  - Summer (DST): UTC-6 (MDT)
- Area code: 307
- FIPS code: 56-03245
- GNIS feature ID: 1609063
- Arlington
- U.S. National Register of Historic Places
- U.S. Historic district
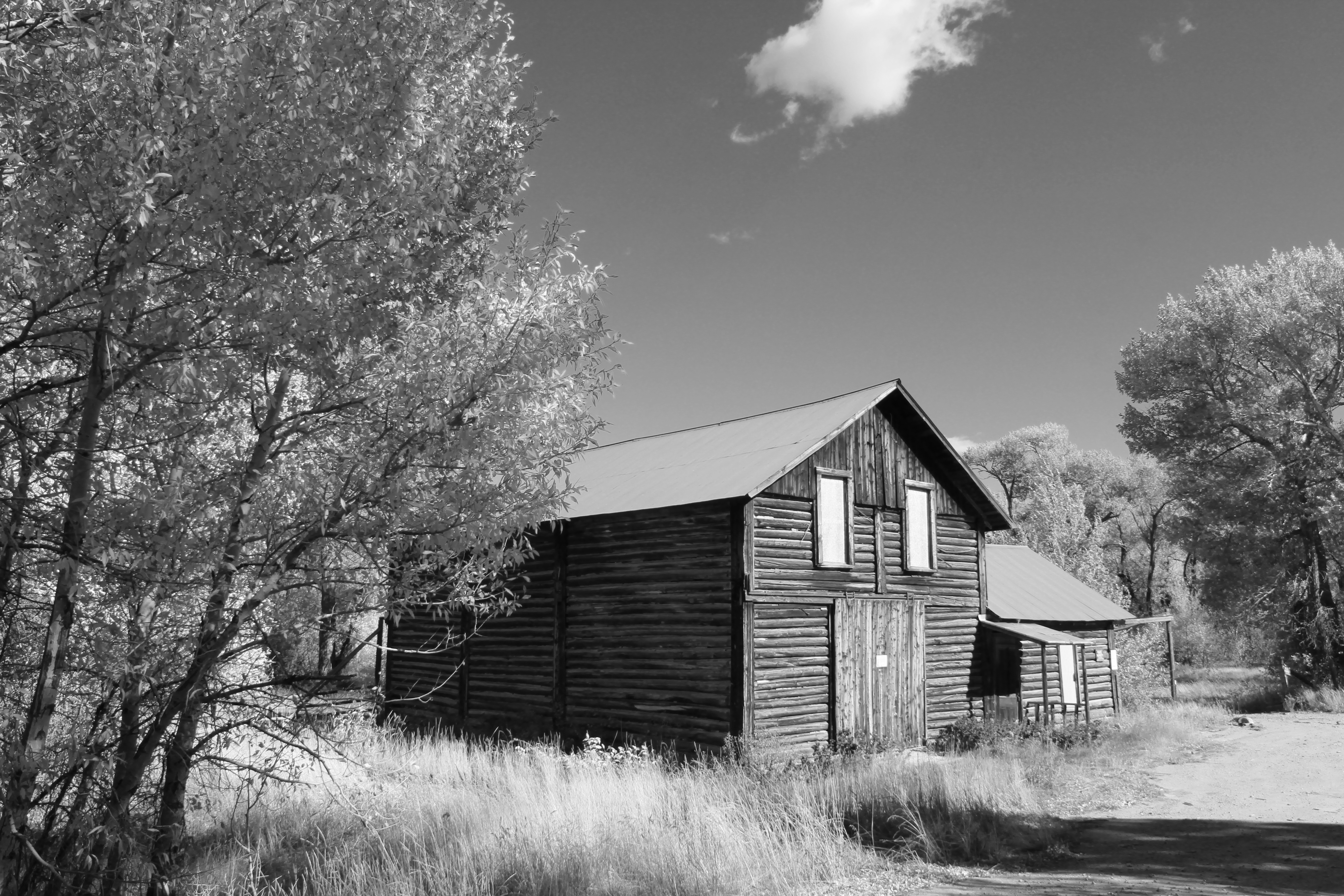

- Location within Wyoming Location within the United States
- Location: South of Interstate 80
- Coordinates: 41°35′41″N 106°12′30″W
- Built: 1860
- NRHP reference No.: 83004268
- Added to NRHP: November 25, 1983

Arlington (also Rockdale and Rock Creek) is a census-designated place (CDP) in southeastern Carbon County, Wyoming, United States. The population was 25 at the 2010 census.

== History ==
In its earliest years, Arlington, called Rock Creek Overland Stage Station, was a commercial stop along the Overland Trail. Founded circa 1860, it began with the establishment of a bridge and stage stop at the crossing of Rock Creek, after which it was named until the early twentieth century. Wagons had to pay $0.75 to cross the log toll bridge. In 1983, the community was listed on the National Register of Historic Places as a historic district for its nineteenth-century significance.

In 1882, a post office was established at Rock Creek under the name of "Rock Dale." Except for a gap in 1924 and 1925, a post office with the name of Arlington was operated in the community from 1902 to 1943.

== Geography ==
Arlington lies at the intersection of Interstate 80 and WYO 13, northwest of Laramie and east of the city of Rawlins, the county seat of Carbon County.

According to the United States Census Bureau, the CDP has a total area of 4.1 square miles (10.5 km^{2}), all land.

== See also ==
- List of census-designated places in Wyoming
