= Laramie Regional Airport =

- IATA: LAR; ICAO: KLAR; FAA LID: LAR

Summary
- Airport type: Public
- Owner: Laramie Regional Airport Board
- Serves: Laramie, Wyoming
- Elevation AMSL: 7,284 ft (2,220 m)
- Coordinates: 41°18′43″N 105°40′30″W
- Website: flylaramie.com

Map
- Location of airport in Wyoming LAR (the United States)

Runways
Direction	Length		Surface
Direction	ft	m	Surface
03/21	8,502	2,591	Asphalt
12/30	6,300	1,920	Asphalt

Statistics (2018)
- Aircraft operations: 10,486
- Based aircraft: 38
- Source: Federal Aviation Administration

Laramie Regional Airport (IATA: LAR, ICAO: KLAR, FAA LID: LAR) is three miles west of Laramie, in Albany County, Wyoming. It is owned by the Laramie Regional Airport Board. Airline service is subsidized by the Essential Air Service program.

According to the Bureau of Transportation Statistics, the airport had 17,850 passenger boardings (enplanements) in calendar year 2025, and 17,580 passenger boardings (enplanements) in calendar year 2024.

The National Plan of Integrated Airport Systems for 2011–2015 categorized it as a primary commercial service airport based on enplanements in 2008 (more than 10,000 per year).

The area has many businesses and the University of Wyoming and the Wyoming Technical Institute. The airport has airline flights to Denver, Colorado, but these are less than one percent of all flights. The airport has an important fire fighting role.

== History ==
Built in 1934, the airport was Brees Field until 1992, after United States Army general Herbert J. Brees. To allow B-24 Bombers the runways were paved in 1944. Airline flights started in 1945; in 1959 the terminal building was built.

== Facilities ==
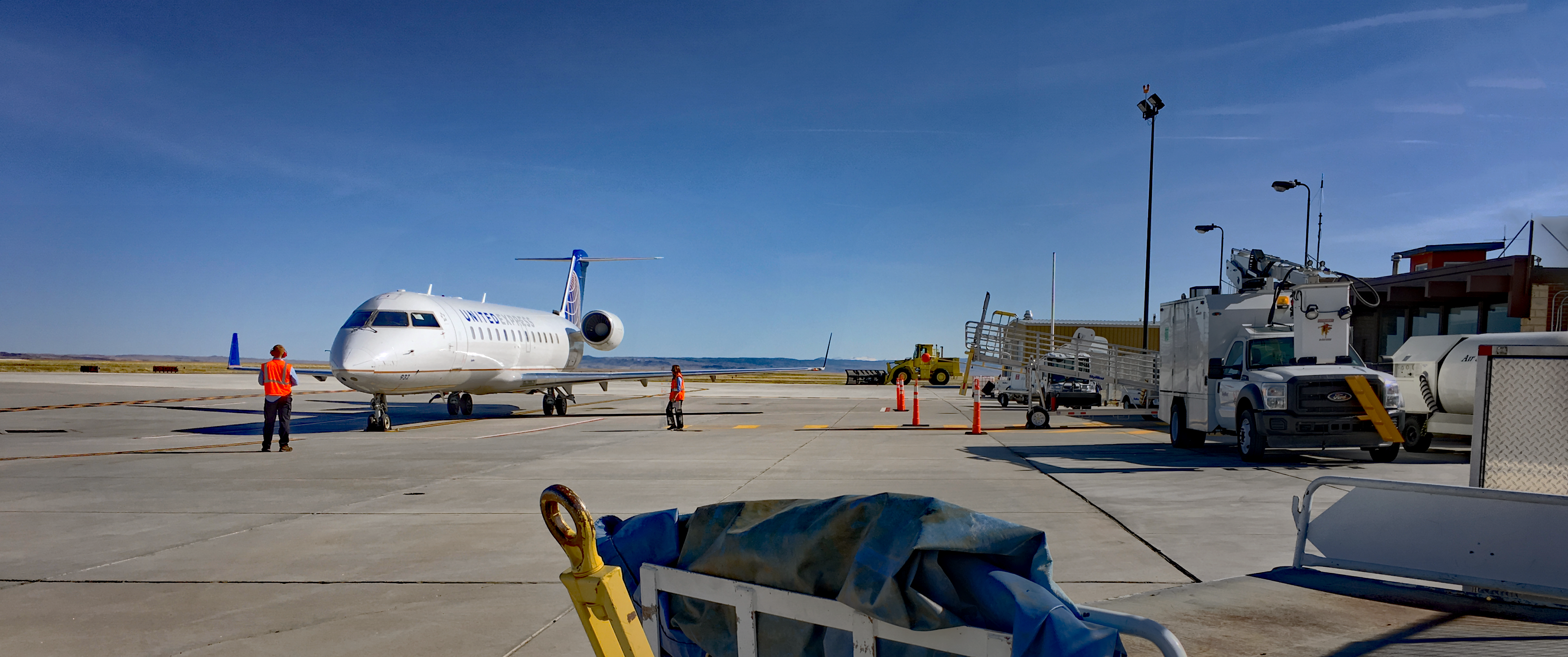
United Express flight ready to depart from Laramie Regional Airport

The airport covers 1,580 acres (639 ha) at an elevation of 7,284 feet (2,220 m). It has two asphalt runways: 3/21 is 8,502 by 150 feet (2,591 x 46 m) and 12/30 is 6,300 by 100 feet (1,920 x 30 m).

In 2018, the airport had 10,486 aircraft operations, an average of 29 per day: 81% general aviation, 14% air taxi, <1% airline, and 5% military. 38 aircraft were then based at this airport: 76% single-engine and 24% multi-engine.

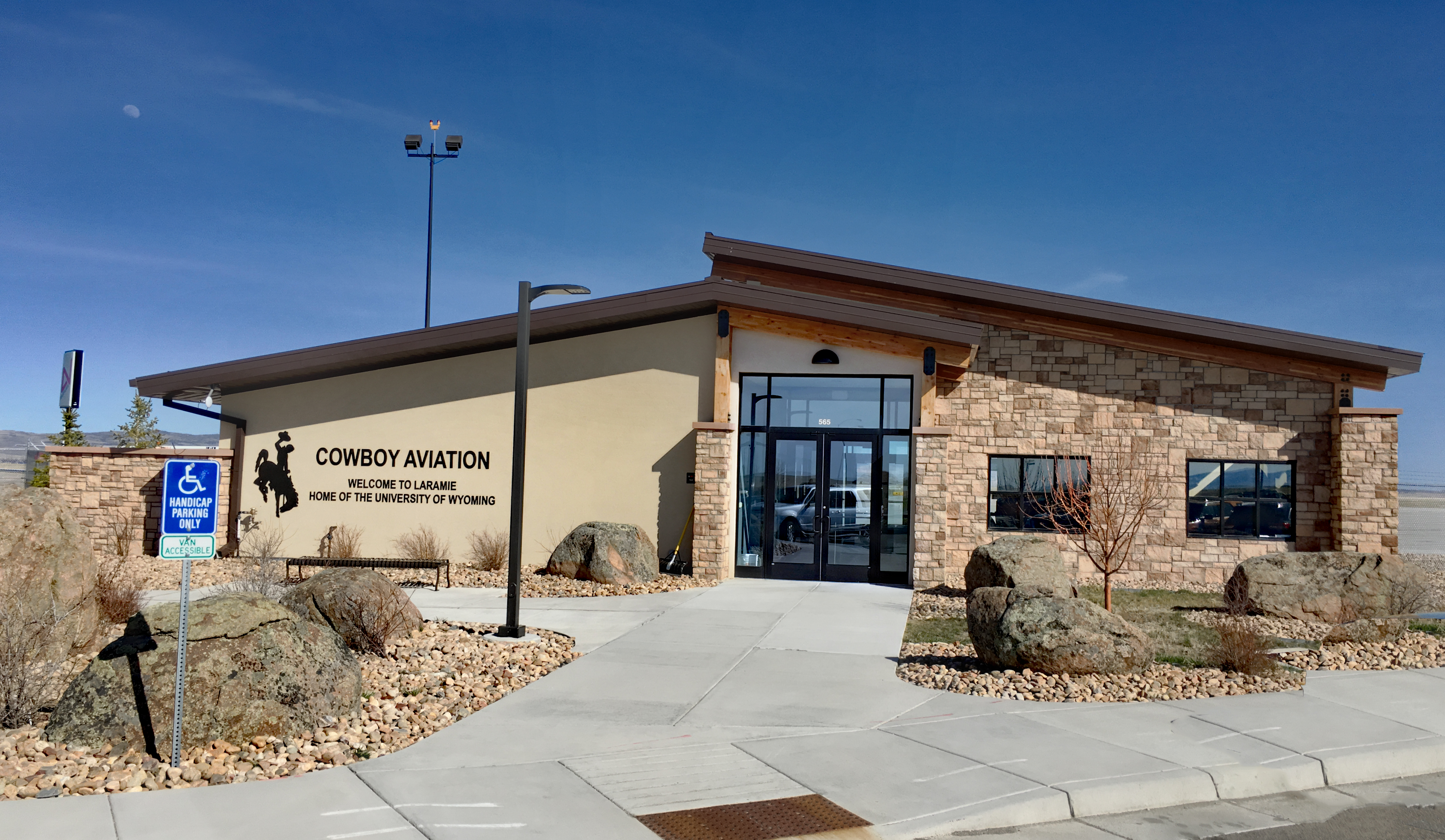
Cowboy Aviation is the fixed-base operation at Laramie Regional Airport serving private aviation. It offers refueling, concierge, a comfortable pilot's lounge and a large conference room.

== Airline and destination ==
Airlines	Destinations
United Express	Denver

== Statistics ==
=== Top destinations ===
Busiest domestic routes from LAR (June 2025 - May 2026)
Rank	Airport	Passengers	Carrier
1	Denver, Colorado	18,630	United

== See also ==
- List of airports in Wyoming

== Other sources ==
- Essential Air Service documents (Docket OST-1997-2958) from the U.S. Department of Transportation:
  - Order 2000-5-14 (May 11, 2000): tentatively reselecting Great Lakes Aviation to provide essential air service at Laramie, Rock Springs and Worland, Wyoming, for the two-year period from May 1, 2000 – April 30, 2002, at an annual subsidies of $297,633, for Laramie, $465,023, for Rock Springs, and $353,345 for Worland.
  - Order 2002-7-20 (July 11, 2002): extends the interim subsidy rates of Great Lakes Aviation, Ltd. at each of the communities listed (Page, AZ; Alamosa, CO; Pueblo, CO; Ironwood, MI/Ashland, WI; McCook, NE; Laramie, WY; Rock Springs, WY; Worland, WY; Moab, UT; Vernal, UT).
  - Order 2004-7-16 (July 20, 2004): selects Great Lakes Aviation, Ltd., to provide essential air service with 19-passenger B1900D aircraft at Laramie, Riverton, Rock Springs, and Worland, Wyoming, for two years for annual subsidy rates of $397,400, $394,046, $390,488, and $797,844, respectively.
  - Order 2006-9-9 (September 11, 2006): re-selecting Great Lakes Aviation, Ltd., operating as both a United Airlines and Frontier code-share partner, to provide subsidized essential air service (EAS) at Laramie and Worland, Wyoming, at an annual subsidy rate of $487,516 for Laramie and $972,757 for Worland, for the two-year period of October 1, 2006, through September 30, 2008.
  - Order 2008-7-3 (July 1, 2008): re-selecting Great Lakes Aviation, Ltd., operating as both a United Airlines and Frontier Airlines code-share partner, to provide subsidized essential air service (EAS) at Laramie and Worland, Wyoming, at an annual subsidy rate of $1,215,603 for Laramie and $1,735,814 for Worland, for the two-year period of October 1, 2008, through September 30, 2010.
  - Order 2010-8-10 (August 18, 2010): selecting Great Lakes Aviation, Ltd., operating as both a United Airlines and Frontier Airlines code share partner, to provide essential air service (EAS) at Laramie and Worland, for a combined annual subsidy of $2,951,908, for the two-year period from October 1, 2010, to September 30, 2012.
