= Rock River, Wyoming =

- Town
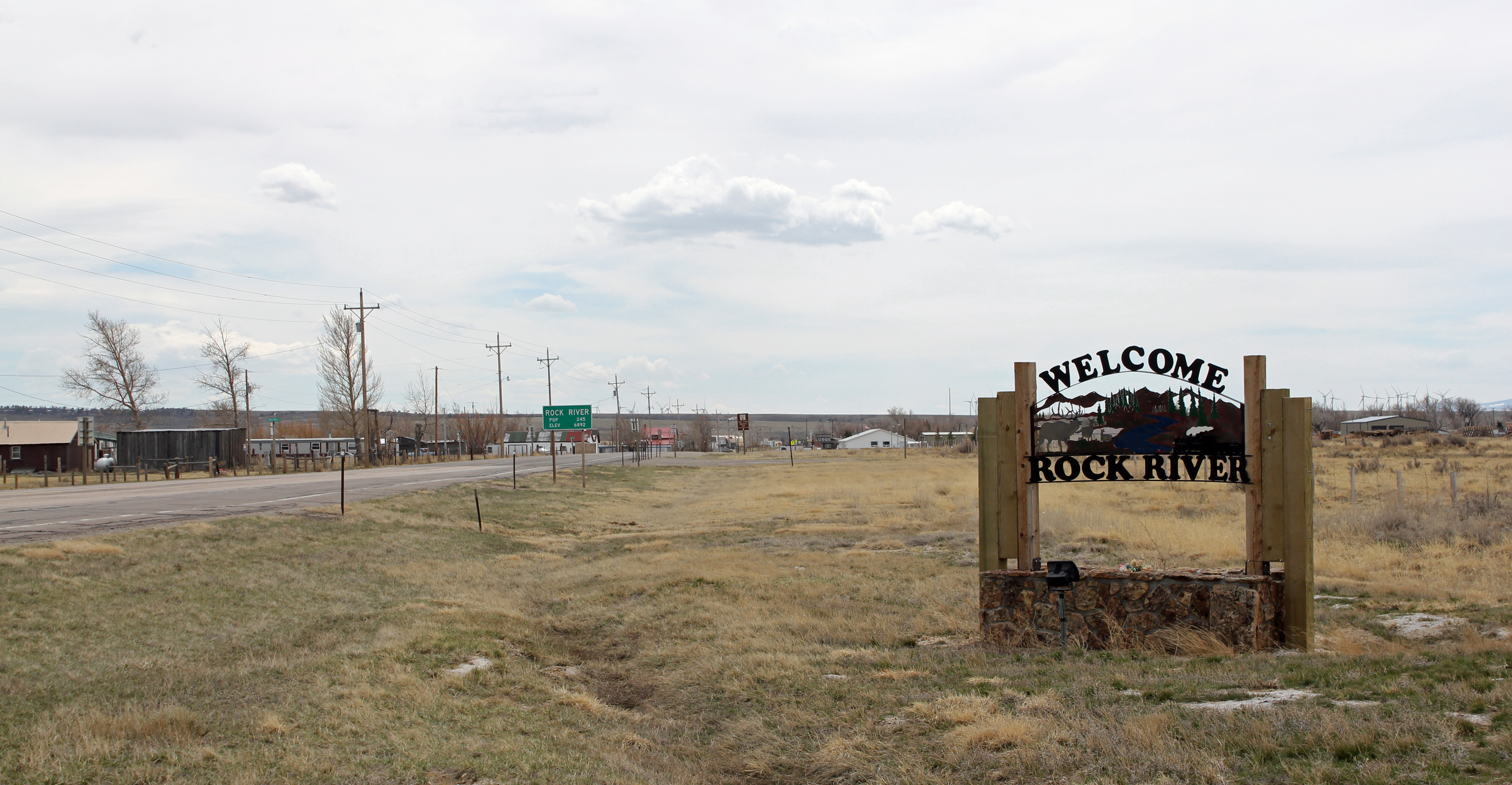
- Entering Rock River from the West on U.S. Route 30.

- Location of Rock River in Albany County, Wyoming.
- Coordinates: 41°44′27″N 105°58′29″W
- Country: United States
- State: Wyoming
- County: Albany
- Founded: 1898

Area
  - Total: 2.33 sq mi (6.03 km^{2})
  - Land: 2.33 sq mi (6.03 km^{2})
  - Water: 0 sq mi (0.00 km^{2})
- Elevation: 6,896 ft (2,102 m)

Population (2020)
  - Total: 211
  - Density: 109.2/sq mi (42.15/km^{2})
- Time zone: UTC-7 (Mountain (MST))
  - Summer (DST): UTC-6 (MDT)
- ZIP Codes: 82058, 82083
- Area code: 307
- FIPS code: 56-67090
- GNIS feature ID: 2412561
- Website: www.townofrockriver.org

Rock River is a town in Albany County, Wyoming, United States. As of the 2020 census, Rock River had a population of 211.

== History ==
Rock River was founded in 1898 along the Union Pacific Railroad line.

== Geography ==
According to the United States Census Bureau, the town has a total area of 2.33 square miles (6.03 km^{2}), all land.

== Demographics ==
Historical population
Census	Pop.	Note	%±
1910	123		—
1920	281		128.5%
1930	260		−7.5%
1940	349		34.2%
1950	424		21.5%
1960	497		17.2%
1970	344		−30.8%
1980	415		20.6%
1990	190		−54.2%
2000	235		23.7%
2010	245		4.3%
2020	211		−13.9%
U.S. Decennial Census

=== 2010 census ===
As of the census of 2010, there were 245 people, 94 households, and 72 families living in the town. The population density was 105.2 inhabitants per square mile (40.6/km^{2}). There were 126 housing units at an average density of 54.1 per square mile (20.9/km^{2}). The racial makeup of the town was 91.4% White, 0.8% Native American, 2.4% from other races, and 5.3% from two or more races. Hispanic or Latino of any race were 9.0% of the population.

There were 94 households, of which 29.8% had children under the age of 18 living with them, 62.8% were married couples living together, 9.6% had a female householder with no husband present, 4.3% had a male householder with no wife present, and 23.4% were non-families. 21.3% of all households were made up of individuals, and 8.5% had someone living alone who was 65 years of age or older. The average household size was 2.61 and the average family size was 2.97.

The median age in the town was 47.5 years. 24.9% of residents were under the age of 18; 3.6% were between the ages of 18 and 24; 18.8% were from 25 to 44; 37% were from 45 to 64; and 15.5% were 65 years of age or older. The gender makeup of the town was 52.2% male and 47.8% female.

=== 2000 census ===
As of the census of 2000, there were 235 people, 94 households, and 67 families living in the town. The population density was 100.1 people per square mile (38.6/km^{2}). There were 123 housing units at an average density of 52.4 per square mile (20.2/km^{2}). The racial makeup of the town was 96.17% White, 3.40% Native American and 0.43% Asian. Hispanic or Latino of any race were 5.53% of the population.

There were 94 households, out of which 29.8% had children under the age of 18 living with them, 61.7% were married couples living together, 5.3% had a female householder with no husband present, and 27.7% were non-families. 24.5% of all households were made up of individuals, and 12.8% had someone living alone who was 65 years of age or older. The average household size was 2.50 and the average family size was 2.99.

In the town, the population was spread out, with 26.8% under the age of 18, 5.1% from 18 to 24, 26.4% from 25 to 44, 26.0% from 45 to 64, and 15.7% who were 65 years of age or older. The median age was 41 years. For every 100 females, there were 117.6 males. For every 100 females age 18 and over, there were 104.8 males.

The median income for a household in the town was $24,306, and the median income for a family was $31,250. Males had a median income of $25,250 versus $18,125 for females. The per capita income for the town was $11,602. About 14.1% of families and 24.2% of the population were below the poverty line, including 39.5% of those under the age of eighteen and 26.3% of those 65 or over.

== Education ==
Public education in the town of Rock River is provided by Rock River school, which is a part of Albany County School District #1. Grades 9 through 12 are expected to contain about 8 total students per grade through the 2010–2011 school year.

Rock River has a public library, a branch of the Albany County Public Library.

== Recreation ==
The town has one restaurant, Shawna's Roadside Café.
