= National Register of Historic Places listings in Niobrara County, Wyoming =

Location of Niobrara County in Wyoming

This is intended to be a complete list of the properties and districts on the National Register of Historic Places in Niobrara County, Wyoming, United States. The locations of National Register properties and districts for which the latitude and longitude coordinates are included below, may be seen in a map.

There are six properties and districts listed on the National Register in the county.

This National Park Service list is complete through NPS recent listings posted September 26, 2025.

Contents: Counties in Wyoming
Albany - Big Horn - Campbell - Carbon - Converse - Crook - Fremont - Goshen - Hot Springs - Johnson - Laramie - Lincoln - Natrona - Niobrara - Park - Platte - Sheridan - Sublette - Sweetwater - Teton - Uinta - Washakie - Weston

== Current listings ==
	Name on the Register	Image	Date listed	Location	City or town	Description
1	Agate Basin Site	Agate Basin Site	February 15, 1974 (#74002029)	Address restricted	Mule Creek Junction vicinity	Paleo-Indian bison kill site yielding fine stone blades.
2	C and H Refinery Historic District	C and H Refinery Historic District	January 16, 2001 (#00001672)	402 W. 8th St. 42°45′14″N 104°27′27″W	Lusk	Remarkably preserved early-20th-century independent oil refinery with 27 contributing properties, symbolizing the impact of the petroleum industry on small western towns.
3	Cheyenne-Black Hills Stage Route and Rawhide Buttes and Running Water Stage Stations	Cheyenne-Black Hills Stage Route and Rawhide Buttes and Running Water Stage Stations	April 16, 1969 (#69000190)	1 mi (1.6 km) west to about 15 mi (24 km) southwest of Lusk; 42°46′12″N 104°28′30″W	Lusk	Segment of a critical stagecoach route in use 1876–1887 between Cheyenne and Deadwood, South Dakota, on account of the Black Hills gold rush, with the sites of two stage stations, one of which was a major mail distribution center. Extends into Goshen County.
4	DSD Bridge over Cheyenne River	DSD Bridge over Cheyenne River	February 22, 1985 (#85000429)	County Road CN14-46; 43°25′17″N 104°07′55″W	Riverview	One of two surviving rigid-connected Pennsylvania truss bridges in Wyoming, built circa 1915.
5	Lusk Water Tower	Lusk Water Tower	August 12, 1991 (#91000997)	Along Chicago and North Western railroad tracks across from U.S. Route 20; 42°45′46″N 104°26′34″W	Lusk	Wyoming's only remaining water stop tower, built in 1886, symbolizing the profound impact of the Chicago and North Western Railway on the state's transportation and settlement during the age of steam.
6	Site of Ferdinand Branstetter Post No. 1, American Legion	Site of Ferdinand Branstetter Post No. 1, American Legion	September 30, 1969 (#69000194)	U.S. Route 20; 42°39′47″N 104°05′25″W	Van Tassell	Site of one of the initial four American Legion posts, organized in 1919 and razed sometime prior to 1969.

== See also ==
- List of National Historic Landmarks in Wyoming
- National Register of Historic Places listings in Wyoming
