= National Register of Historic Places listings in Goshen County, Wyoming =

Location of Goshen County in Wyoming

This is a list of the National Register of Historic Places listings in Goshen County, Wyoming. It is intended to be a complete list of the properties and districts on the National Register of Historic Places in Goshen County, Wyoming, United States. The locations of National Register properties and districts for which the latitude and longitude coordinates are included below, may be seen in a map.

There are 7 properties and districts listed on the National Register in the county.

This National Park Service list is complete through NPS recent listings posted March 21, 2025.

Contents: Counties in Wyoming
Albany - Big Horn - Campbell - Carbon - Converse - Crook - Fremont - Goshen - Hot Springs - Johnson - Laramie - Lincoln - Natrona - Niobrara - Park - Platte - Sheridan - Sublette - Sweetwater - Teton - Uinta - Washakie - Weston

== Current listings ==
	Name on the Register	Image	Date listed	Location	City or town	Description
1	Cheyenne-Black Hills Stage Route and Rawhide Buttes and Running Water Stage Stations	Cheyenne-Black Hills Stage Route and Rawhide Buttes and Running Water Stage Stations	April 16, 1969 (#69000190)	1 mi (1.6 km) west to about 15 mi (24 km) southwest of Lusk; 42°46′12″N 104°28′30″W	Lusk	
2	Fort Laramie National Historic Site	Fort Laramie National Historic Site	October 15, 1966 (#66000755)	3 mi (4.8 km) southwest of Fort Laramie; 42°12′20″N 104°33′02″W	Fort Laramie	
3	Fort Laramie Three-Mile Hog Ranch		April 23, 1975 (#75001901)	5.5 mi (8.9 km) west of Fort Laramie along the Laramie River; 42°11′49″N 104°37′20″W	Fort Laramie	
4	Hell Gap Paleoindian Site (48GO305)		December 23, 2016 (#100000877)	Address restricted 42°24′30″N 104°38′22″W	Guernsey	
5	Jay Em Historic District	Jay Em Historic District	April 12, 1984 (#84003665)	Main St. 42°27′40″N 104°22′11″W	Jay Em	
6	South Torrington Union Pacific Depot	South Torrington Union Pacific Depot	December 31, 1974 (#74002025)	U.S. Route 85; 42°02′53″N 104°11′01″W	Torrington	
7	US Post Office-Torrington Main	US Post Office-Torrington Main	May 19, 1987 (#87000783)	2145 Main St. 42°03′57″N 104°11′03″W	Torrington	

== See also ==
- List of National Historic Landmarks in Wyoming
- National Register of Historic Places listings in Wyoming
