= Union Pacific Depot =

Union Pacific Depot or variations such as Union Pacific Station or Union Pacific Railroad Depot may refer to:

== Train stations ==
=== Colorado ===
- Greeley Union Pacific Railroad Depot, Greeley, listed on the NRHP in Weld County, Colorado
- Union Pacific Railroad Julesburg Depot, Julesburg, listed on the NRHP in Sedgwick County, Colorado
- Sterling Union Pacific Railroad Depot, Sterling, listed on the NRHP in Logan County, Colorado

=== Idaho ===
- Boise Union Pacific Depot, Boise, Idaho

=== Kansas ===
- Abilene Union Pacific Railroad Freight Depot, on Cedar Street in Abilene, listed on the NRHP in Dickinson County, Kansas
- Union Pacific Railroad Depot (Concordia, Kansas), listed on the NRHP
- Union Pacific Railroad Depot (Solomon, Kansas), listed on the National Register of Historic Places in Dickinson County, Kansas
- Union Pacific Railroad Passenger Depot, Topeka, Shawnee County, Kansas

=== Utah ===
- Union Pacific Railroad Depot (Eureka, Utah), listed on the National Register of Historic Places in Juab County, Utah
- Union Pacific Railroad Depot (Milford, Utah); see Desert Wind
- Morgan Union Pacific Depot, Morgan, Utah
- Salt Lake City Union Pacific Depot or Salt Lake Union Pacific Railroad Station, Salt Lake City, listed on the NRHP in Salt Lake County, Utah

=== Wyoming ===
- Union Pacific Railroad Depot (Cheyenne, Wyoming), listed on the National Register of Historic Places in Laramie County, Wyoming
- Union Pacific Railroad Complex (Evanston, Wyoming), listed on the NRHP
- Union Pacific Railroad Depot (Green River, Wyoming), Green River, Wyoming
- Medicine Bow Union Pacific Depot, Medicine Bow, Wyoming, listed on the NRHP
- Union Pacific Railroad Depot (Rawlins, Wyoming), listed on the NRHP
- South Torrington Union Pacific Depot, South Torrington, Wyoming, listed on the NRHP
- South Torrington Union Pacific Depot, Torrington, Wyoming
- Medicine Bow Union Pacific Depot, Medicine Bow, Wyoming

== See also ==
- Union Station (disambiguation)
- Central Station (disambiguation)
