= National Register of Historic Places listings in Dickinson County, Kansas =

Location of Dickinson County in Kansas

This is a list of the National Register of Historic Places listings in Dickinson County, Kansas.

This is intended to be a complete list of the properties and districts on the National Register of Historic Places in Dickinson County, Kansas, United States. Latitude and longitude coordinates are provided for many National Register properties and districts; these locations may be seen together in a map.

There are 47 properties and districts listed on the National Register in the county, including 1 National Historic Landmark. Another 4 properties were once listed but have been removed.

This National Park Service list is complete through NPS recent listings posted April 17, 2026.

== Current listings ==
	Name on the Register	Image	Date listed	Location	City or town	Description
1	Abilene City Park Historic District	Abilene City Park Historic District	June 6, 2002 (#02000608)	4th St. at Poplar St. and Pine St. 38°55′10″N 97°13′38″W	Abilene	
2	Abilene Downtown Historic District	Abilene Downtown Historic District	September 1, 2009 (#09000673)	Roughly bounded by Northeast 4th, West 1st, South Walnut, and North Olive Street; 38°55′02″N 97°12′51″W	Abilene	
3	Abilene Historic District No. 1	Abilene Historic District No. 1	January 11, 2006 (#05001514)	301, 303, 305, 307, and 309 N. Buckeye; 38°55′02″N 97°12′48″W	Abilene	
4	Abilene Union Pacific Railroad Freight Depot	Abilene Union Pacific Railroad Freight Depot	September 2, 1993 (#93000894)	110 N. Cedar St. 38°54′58″N 97°13′01″W	Abilene	
5	Abilene Union Pacific Railroad Passenger Depot	Abilene Union Pacific Railroad Passenger Depot	September 8, 1992 (#92001175)	Junction of N. 2nd St. and Broadway; 38°54′59″N 97°12′54″W	Abilene	
6	ATSF Steam Locomotive No. 3415	ATSF Steam Locomotive No. 3415	April 16, 2012 (#12000203)	411 S. Elm St. 38°54′49″N 97°13′18″W	Abilene	
7	Berger House	Berger House	June 27, 2007 (#07000606)	208 NE 12th St. 38°55′37″N 97°12′40″W	Abilene	
8	John W. Birchmore House	John W. Birchmore House	April 7, 2014 (#14000116)	1204 N. Buckeye Ave. 38°55′39″N 97°12′53″W	Abilene	
9	Brewer Scout Cabin	Brewer Scout Cabin	July 18, 2000 (#00000770)	Solomon City Park, 100 E. 4th St. 38°55′03″N 97°22′13″W	Solomon	
10	Chapman Creek Pratt Truss Bridge	Chapman Creek Pratt Truss Bridge	May 9, 2003 (#03000375)	Quail Rd., 1.7 miles (2.7 km) south of intersection with Highway 18, 2.5 miles (4.0 km) north of Chapman; 39°00′31″N 97°02′12″W	Chapman	
11	Emerson Coulson House	Emerson Coulson House	April 14, 1995 (#95000444)	813 N. Olive St. 38°55′24″N 97°12′35″W	Abilene	
12	Eisenhower Home	Eisenhower Home	January 25, 1971 (#71000306)	201 SE 4th St. 38°54′45″N 97°12′42″W	Abilene	
13	Eliason Barn	Eliason Barn	April 8, 2009 (#09000189)	174 Highway 4; 38°41′00″N 97°21′46″W	Holland Township	Agriculture-Related Resources of Kansas MPS
14	Elms Hotel	Elms Hotel	July 10, 2008 (#08000644)	201 W. 1st St. 38°54′55″N 97°12′53″W	Abilene	
15	Jacob S. Engle House	Jacob S. Engle House	January 11, 2017 (#100000506)	102 Highland Dr. 38°55′45″N 97°12′52″W	Abilene	
16	Freeman-Zumbrunn House	Freeman-Zumbrunn House	November 14, 2002 (#02001266)	3052 Quail Rd. 39°02′04″N 97°02′09″W	Chapman	
17	Garfield Elementary School	Garfield Elementary School	November 4, 2009 (#09000874)	300 NW 7th St. 38°55′18″N 97°12′56″W	Abilene	
18	David R. Gorden House	David R. Gorden House	July 3, 2012 (#12000384)	400 N. Cedar St. 38°55′07″N 97°13′01″W	Abilene	
19	Herington Carnegie Public Library	Herington Carnegie Public Library	June 25, 1987 (#87000953)	102 S. Broadway; 38°40′05″N 96°56′30″W	Herington	
20	Hoffman and Lamb Buildings	Hoffman and Lamb Buildings	January 11, 2017 (#100000510)	102-104 S. Factory St. 38°54′18″N 97°07′02″W	Enterprise	
21	J.S. Hollinger Farmstead	J.S. Hollinger Farmstead	July 8, 2010 (#10000448)	2250 2100 Ave. 38°53′46″N 96°58′23″W	Chapman	
22	Hotel Sunflower	Hotel Sunflower	May 25, 2001 (#01000539)	409 NW 3rd St. 38°54′59″N 97°13′01″W	Abilene	
23	John Johntz House	John Johntz House	September 20, 1991 (#91001437)	214 N. Walnut; 38°55′05″N 97°13′10″W	Abilene	
24	Gustave A. Kubach House	Gustave A. Kubach House	October 9, 2013 (#13000815)	101 S. Buckeye Ave. 38°54′54″N 97°12′51″W	Abilene	
25	Lander Park Carousel	Lander Park Carousel	February 27, 1987 (#87000813)	412 S. Campbell St. 38°54′41″N 97°12′31″W	Abilene	
26	C.H. Lebold House	C.H. Lebold House	May 8, 1973 (#73000751)	106 N. Vine St. 38°54′56″N 97°13′24″W	Abilene	
27	William and Minnie Liggett House	William and Minnie Liggett House	March 27, 2023 (#100008787)	519 North D St. 38°40′31″N 96°56′23″W	Herington	
28	Litts-Dieter House	Litts-Dieter House	July 14, 2000 (#00000789)	702 North Cedar; 38°55′19″N 97°12′59″W	Abilene	
29	Mead-Rogers House	Mead-Rogers House	July 14, 2000 (#00000790)	813 NW 3rd St. 38°55′01″N 97°13′28″W	Abilene	
30	Naroma Court Historic District	Naroma Court Historic District	November 28, 2007 (#07001224)	800 N. Buckeye; 801, 803, 805 Spruceway; 106 Naroma Ct. 38°55′21″N 97°12′52″W	Abilene	
31	Perring Building	Perring Building	December 31, 1998 (#98001561)	115 NW 3rd and 118 NW 2nd Sts. 38°55′05″N 97°12′52″W	Abilene	
32	Pray Farmstead(s)	Pray Farmstead(s)	April 18, 2025 (#100011740)	178 Hawk Road; 38°37′15″N 97°12′22″W	Hope	
33	Prospect Park Farm	Prospect Park Farm	February 19, 1982 (#82002654)	Southeast of Chapman; 38°52′52″N 96°59′09″W	Chapman	
34	Rock Island Depot	Rock Island Depot	April 12, 2010 (#10000177)	200 SE Fifth St. 38°54′38″N 97°12′43″W	Abilene	
35	St. John's Episcopal Church	St. John's Episcopal Church	May 25, 2001 (#01000537)	519 N. Buckeye Ave. 38°55′12″N 97°12′47″W	Abilene	
36	A. B. Seelye House	A. B. Seelye House	April 25, 1986 (#86000859)	1105 N. Buckeye; 38°55′36″N 97°12′45″W	Abilene	
37	D.G. Smith Building	D.G. Smith Building	August 31, 1995 (#95001053)	217 W. 1st St. 38°54′53″N 97°13′04″W	Abilene	
38	Smoky Hill Trail and Butterfield Overland Despatch Segment	Smoky Hill Trail and Butterfield Overland Despatch Segment	July 7, 2015 (#15000381)	522 Golf Course Rd. 38°58′16″N 97°02′08″W	Chapman	
39	Staatz House	Staatz House	February 4, 2005 (#04001426)	1824 Wolf Rd. 38°51′41″N 96°55′34″W	Junction City	
40	Trinity Evangelical Lutheran Church	Trinity Evangelical Lutheran Church	November 1, 2006 (#06000965)	320 N. Cedar St. 38°55′05″N 97°13′00″W	Abilene	
41	Union Electric Warehouse	Union Electric Warehouse	September 20, 2021 (#100007020)	205 South Cedar St. 38°54′50″N 97°13′00″W	Abilene	
42	United Building	United Building	May 25, 2001 (#01000538)	300 N. Cedar St. 38°55′03″N 97°13′00″W	Abilene	
43	US Post Office-Herington	US Post Office-Herington	October 17, 1989 (#89001641)	17 E. Main St. 38°40′11″N 96°56′29″W	Herington	
44	Versteeg-Swisher House	Versteeg-Swisher House	March 23, 2005 (#05000201)	506 S. Campbell; 38°54′36″N 97°12′14″W	Abilene	
45	Vine Street Historic District	Vine Street Historic District	July 2, 2018 (#100002622)	301 to 415 N Vine & 808-810 NW 3rd Sts. 38°55′03″N 97°13′24″W	Abilene	
46	Wheatland Farm Historic District	Wheatland Farm Historic District	January 28, 2004 (#03001494)	2291 2100 Ave. 38°53′36″N 96°57′55″W	Chapman	
47	Wilson Pratt Truss Bridge	Wilson Pratt Truss Bridge	January 22, 2009 (#08001349)	2.9 miles (4.7 km) west of Rain Rd. on 3200 Ave. 39°03′38″N 97°04′21″W	Chapman	

== Former listings ==
	Name on the Register	Image	Date listed	Date removed	Location	City or town	Description
1	First Presbyterian Church of Abilene		May 25, 2001 (#01000540)	January 7, 2015	300 N. Mulberry St. 38°55′04″N 97°13′05″W	Abilene	Destroyed by fire on July 23, 2014.
2	Old Belle Springs Creamery and Produce Building		April 12, 1982 (#82002653)	February 5, 1999	Court and Cottage Sts.	Abilene	Demolished in April, 1998
3	St. Patrick's Mission Church and School		June 26, 1987 (#87000983)	May 6, 2009	Northeast of Chapman; 38°58′51″N 97°00′26″W	Chapman	Destroyed by a tornado June 11, 2008.
4	Union Pacific Railroad Depot		April 26, 1972 (#72000491)	August 27, 1977	3rd St. between Walnut and Pine Sts.	Solomon	Demolished in 1977.

== See also ==
- List of National Historic Landmarks in Kansas
- National Register of Historic Places listings in Kansas
