= Rawhide =

Rawhide may refer to:

- Rawhide (material), a hide or animal skin that has not been tanned
- Whip made from rawhide

== Entertainment ==
- Rawhide (1926 film), a Western directed by Richard Thorpe
- Rawhide (1938 film), a Western starring baseball player Lou Gehrig
- Rawhide (1951 film), a Western starring Tyrone Power and Susan Hayward
- Rawhide (TV series), a Western television series featuring Eric Fleming and Clint Eastwood, which ran 1959–1965
  - "Rawhide" (song), a 1958 Western song originally recorded by Frankie Laine, theme to the TV series
- Rawhide, was a popular daily satirical CBC Radio program that ran from 1946 to 1962, hosted by broadcaster Max Ferguson, as well as the name of a character played by Ferguson on the show
- "Raw Hide", a song by Ol' Dirty Bastard from his 1995 album Return to the 36 Chambers

== Fictional characters ==
- Rawhide Clyde, a character from the animated cartoon Crazy Claws from the 1981 series The Kwicky Koala Show
- Rawhide Kid, a fictional cowboy in the Marvel Comics universe introduced in 1955

== People ==
- Secret Service codename of President Ronald Reagan
- James Douglas, Jr. (1867–1949), known as "Rawhide Jimmy", Canadian-American businessman and mining executive
- Jim Tabor (1916-1953), American Major League Baseball player nicknamed "Rawhide"

== Places in the United States ==
- Rawhide, Nevada, a former town
- Rawhide, Virginia, an unincorporated community
- Rawhide Mountains, Arizona
- Rawhide Buttes, Wyoming
- Rawhide Creek, Nebraska
- Rawhide Mine, a coal mine in Wyoming

== Other ==
- Rawhide (computing), a development version of the Fedora computer operating system
- VRC-40, a United States Navy fleet logistics support squadron also known as "the Rawhides"
- Walla Walla and Columbia River Railroad, also known as the Rawhide Railroad, a defunct railroad in the state of Washington
- Visalia Rawhide, an American minor league baseball team
