= Mule Creek Junction, Wyoming =

Former community in Wyoming

Coordinates: 43°22′43.67″N 104°13′21″W

Mule Creek Junction is a former community in Niobrara County, Wyoming at the junction of US 18 and US 85.

Direction	via	Destination	Distance from Mule Creek Junction
North	US 85	Newcastle, Wyoming	33 miles (53 km)
East	US 18	Edgemont, South Dakota	22 miles (35 km)
South	US 18/US 85	Lusk, Wyoming	46 miles (74 km)

== Geography ==
The Junction is located on the southwest corner of the Black Hills proper.

A Wyoming Department of Transportation rest area, reconstructed in 2007–08, is located on the northeast corner of the Junction. The southeast corner of the site has been occupied by various service stations and truck stops, the last of which was demolished (after suffering a fire - see below) in the late 1990s. The junction is located a short distance south of the Cheyenne River, and is in a typical Wyoming High Plains setting. Several historical and scenic markers at the rest area describe the setting.

== History ==
The routes have been in use since the discovery of gold in the Northern Black Hills (at Deadwood) in 1875. The original Cheyenne-Deadwood Stage Route alignment is located about six miles to the east, and was used as the original alignment of US 85, until 1957–58, when the present alignment was constructed. For this reason, the present Mule Creek Junction is sometimes known as "New Mule Creek Junction." A former route, Alternate US 85, used to begin at the original Mule Creek Junction and followed today's US 18 alignment into South Dakota. US 85A (shown on some early maps US 85E) followed US 18 east to Hot Springs, then headed due north via the current US 385 to Custer and Lead through the Black Hills. U.S. 85A was deleted when U.S. 385 was commissioned in the 1940s. US 18 is one of the original 1926 U.S. routes. It began at US 85 in the original Mule Creek Junction, about four miles west of the South Dakota state line. In 1938, US 18 was paired with the then-new Alternate U.S. 85, which was commissioned to provide an alternate route for US 85 travelers into the Black Hills.

In 1964, Mule Creek Junction had a population of about 30. A solar-powered rest stop was constructed here in 1985. Because there was no local source of potable water, 5,000 gallons were trucked to Mule Creek Junction twice a month. In 1999, a fire destroyed the convenience store, gas station, restaurant and bar in Mule Creek Junction, as well as a house. Several customers were in the store at the time but were easily able to exit the building.
