= Thomas M. Fagan =

American politician (1882–1931)

Member of the Wyoming House of Representatives from the Niobrara County district
- In office 1925–1927 Serving with William Jack

Personal details
- Born: March 1882 Monroe County, Iowa, U.S.
- Died: November 1931 (aged 49) Lusk, Wyoming, U.S.
- Party: Democratic
- Spouse: Josephine Fagan
- Profession: Politician

Thomas M. Fagan (March 1882 – November 1931) was an American politician from Lusk, Wyoming, who served a single term in the Wyoming House of Representatives, representing Niobrara County from 1925 to 1927 (Note: According to the Wyoming Legislature, Thomas M. Fagan only served in 1925.) as a Democrat in the 18th Wyoming Legislature.

== Early life ==
Fagan was born in Monroe County, Iowa, in March 1882.

== Career ==
Fagan was elected to the Wyoming House of Representatives to represent Niobrara County from 1925 to 1927 as a Democrat in the 18th Wyoming Legislature. Fagan represented Niobrara County alongside William Jack.

Fagan was a delegate to the Democratic National Convention from Wyoming in 1928.

== Personal life and death ==
Fagan was married to Josephine Fagan, who also served in the Wyoming House of Representatives. She was elected in 1932, and represented Niobrara County from 1933 to 1935 (Note: According to the Wyoming Legislature, Josephine Fagan only served in 1933.) as a Democrat in the 22nd Wyoming Legislature.

Fagan died at the age of 49 at his home in Lusk, Wyoming, in November 1931.

== See also ==
- Josephine Fagan, Fagan's wife, who also represented Niobrara County as a Democrat in the Wyoming House of Representatives

== Notes ==
Wyoming House of Representatives
Preceded by —	Member of the Wyoming House of Representatives from the Niobrara County district 1925–1927; Served alongside: William Jack	Succeeded by —
