= Jay Em Historic District =

Historic district in Wyoming, United States

- U.S. National Register of Historic Places
- U.S. Historic district
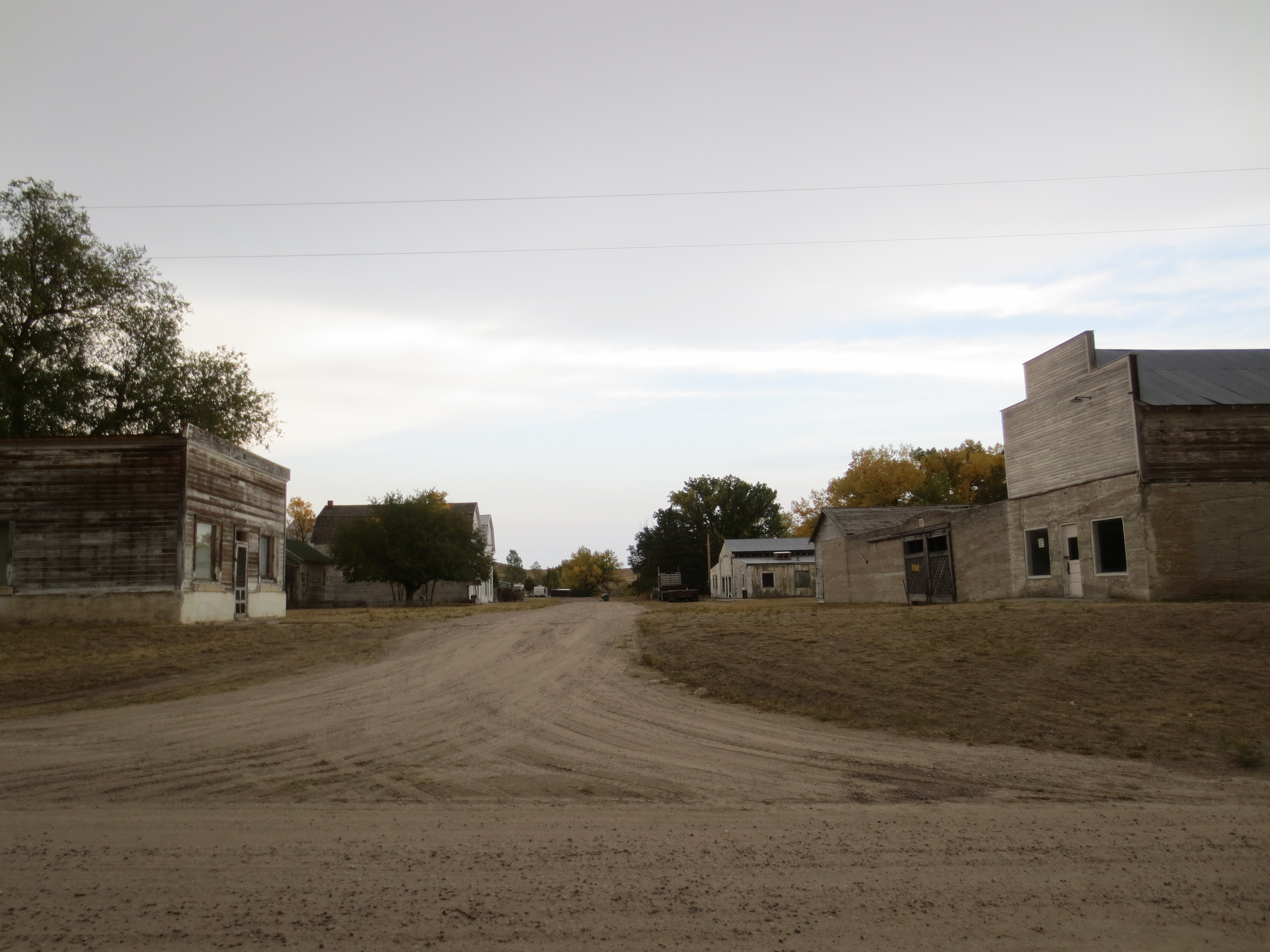

- Location within Wyoming Location within the United States
- Location: Main St., Jay Em, Wyoming
- Coordinates: 42°27′40″N 104°22′11″W
- Built: 1915
- Architects: Harris, Lake
- NRHP reference No.: 84003665
- Added to NRHP: April 12, 1984

The Jay Em Historic District comprises the abandoned center of the village of Jay Em, Wyoming. The town was planned and established by Lake Harris between 1912 and 1915 as a service town supporting ranchers in the surrounding area. The place was recognized as a town in 1915 when a post office was established. Tours of the site are available by appointment.

== History ==
Jay Em is located on the old Texas Trail, running north–south through Goshen County, and featured the last watering hole before reaching Lusk. The land around the watering hole was claimed by Jim Moore in the 1860s. By 1869, Moore had the second largest cattle ranch in the Wyoming Territory, under the brand "J Rolling M", leading to the naming of a small drainage "Jay Em Creek". Moore died in 1875, but his brand outlived him. In 1905, Silas Harris and his three sons took over the Jay Em Cattle Company. One of his sons, Lake Harris, established a post office in the Jay Em Ranch's bunkhouse, bringing the mail from Rawhide Buttes. The Harris family also established a general store on the ranch.

Lake Harris filed a homestead claim in 1912 on Rawhide Creek, where he planned and built a small town. He first built his own house, then a feed store, which housed the post office from 1915. The Harris general store moved into Jay Em in 1918, and Harris built a lumber and general supply store shortly after. A newspaper, the weekly Jay Em Sentinel and Fort Laramie News (circulation 300), inevitably edited by Lake Harris, ran from 1917 to 1921. The Farmers State Bank was built in Jay Em in 1920. The town continued through the 1920s and 1930s as a regional center for commerce in northern Goshen County. In 1935, Lake Harris established the Jay Em Stone Company, making tombstones and building products from stone quarried around the Rawhide Buttes. After the 1930s, Jay Em declined as the automobile made it easier for local residents to travel to larger towns. The general store lasted until the late 1970s. Lake Harris died in 1983 at the age of 96. The few remaining residents of Jay Em have moved to more modern accommodations scattered around the edge of town, leaving the center vacant.

== Contributing structures ==
- Restaurant-Feed Store-Post Office-General Store: The multi-purpose building consists of two 2½ story gambrel-roofed frame buildings connected by a single story flat-roofed link.
- Lumber Yard: The lumber yard building features a 2½ story false fronted building backed by a warehouse with a courtyard between. The sales building is of concrete block, while the warehouse is mostly wood frame.
- Stone company: A brick gabled building with shed roofed wings to either side. The front is distinguished by fifteen windows with concrete surrounds and ornamented lintels.
- Bank: A small one story frame building with a low corniced facade.
- Gas Station: A one-story wood-frame building with the front gable overhanging to create a sheltered drive-through.
- Repair garage: A one-story building with a stepped false front, ornamented by globe finials.
- House: A one-story frame house on a concrete block foundation.
- Water tower: A deteriorated structure now 60 feet (18 m) tall, its tank missing.
- Lake Harris House: An irregularly massed one and two story frame house. The house was built over the original dugout, with an "owl wall" still in evidence.

The Jay Em Historic District was listed on the National Register of Historic Places in 1984.
