= Jay Em, Wyoming =

- Unincorporated community
- Location within the state of Wyoming Jay Em (the United States)
- Coordinates: 42°27′41″N 104°22′11″W
- Country: United States
- State: Wyoming
- County: Goshen
- Established: 1915
- Elevation: 4,590 ft (1,400 m)
- Time zone: UTC-7 (Mountain (MST))
  - Summer (DST): UTC-6 (MDT)
- ZIP codes: 82219
- GNIS feature ID: 1590066

Jay Em is an unincorporated community in northern Goshen County, Wyoming, United States, just below the headwaters of the Rawhide Creek, on the old Texas Trail. It lies along U.S. Route 85, 35 miles north of the city of Torrington, the county seat of Goshen County. Its elevation is 4,590 feet (1,399 m). Although unincorporated, Jay Em has a post office, with ZIP code 82219.

== History ==
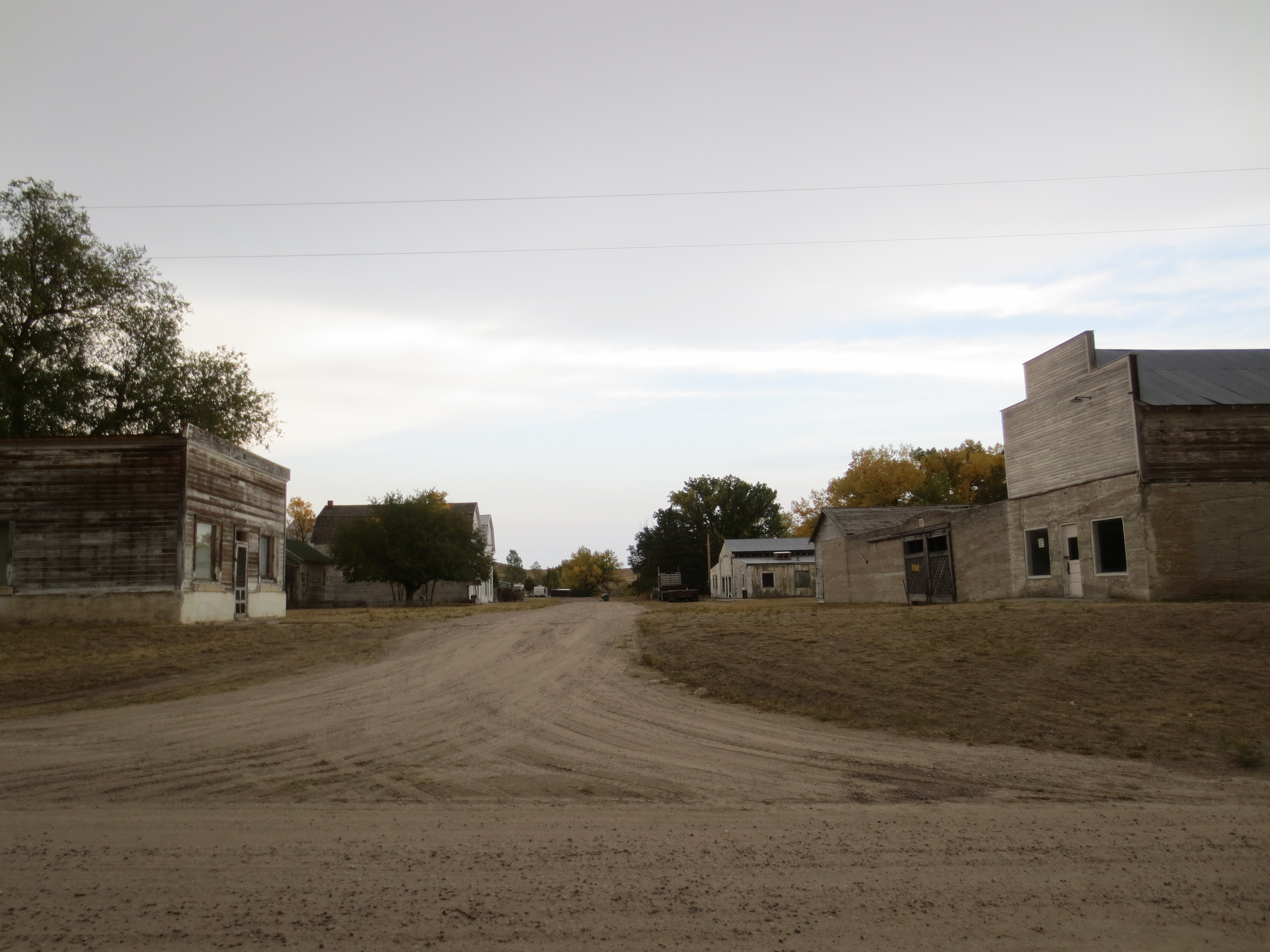
Jay Em Historic District Nat'l Register of Historic Places

The site of the town was a watering hole on old Texas Trail. The land around the watering hole was claimed by Jim Moore in the 1860s. By 1869, Moore had the second largest cattle ranch in the Wyoming Territory, under the brand "J Rolling M", from which the community and "Jay Em Creek" would take later their names.

The town was established to support ranchers in the surrounding area by Lake Harris between 1912 and 1915, and by 1915 a post office was established. A newspaper, the weekly Jay Em Sentinel and Fort Laramie News (circulation 300) ran from 1917 to 1921. The town thrived with a number of businesses growing up, including a lumber yard and general store, and the Jay Em Stone Company, which made gravestones and building products from stone quarried in the Rawhide Buttes area. In the 1930s, a gem cutting workshop was established.

By the 1930s and the advent of the automobile, the town began declining somewhat, and beginning in the 1980s, most of the few remaining residents gradually moved to more modern accommodations scattered around the edges of town, eventually leaving the old, historic center of town for the most part abandoned. One of the remaining buildings is the old Shoults Garage, which operated from 1928 to 1945; and then as the Wolfe Garage from 1946 until 1960. Also still standing are a gas station, a lumber mill, the general and hardware stores, the stone cutting business, and a bank.

The town hosted thousands of visitors who came to view the solar eclipse of August 21, 2017

== Historic district ==
The center of the original community is included in the Jay Em Historic District, and listed on the National Register of Historic Places.

== Education ==
Public education for the community of Jay Em is provided by Goshen County School District #1.

== Main highway ==
- U.S. Highway 85
