= Abilene station (Union Pacific Railroad) =

Former railroad station in Abilene, Kansas

- Abilene Union Pacific Railroad Passenger Depot
- U.S. National Register of Historic Places
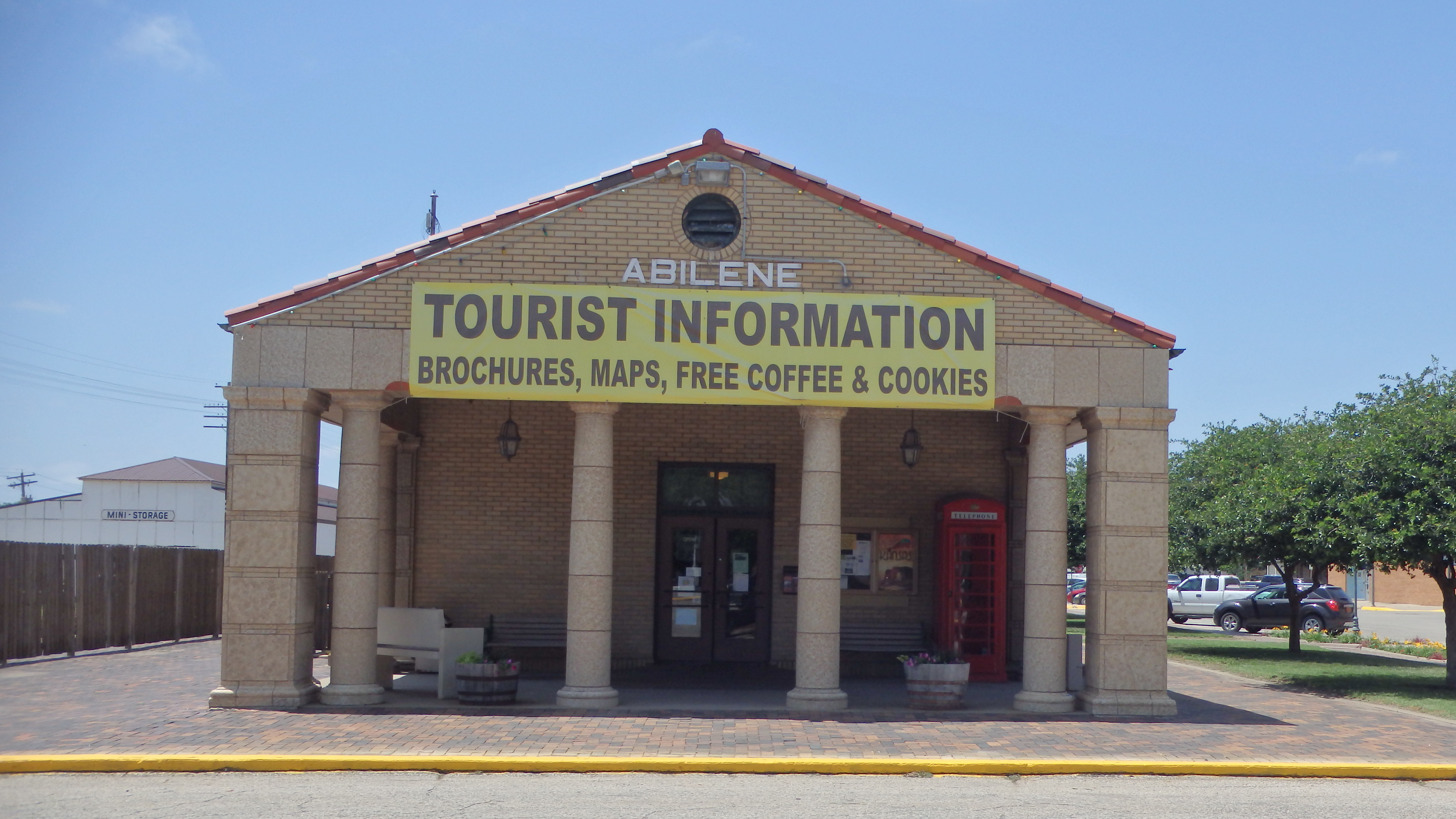
- The former Union Pacific Depot as seen from the parking lot across from Spruce Street and North 2nd Street

- Location within Kansas
- Location: Jct. of N. Second St. and Broadway, Abilene, Kansas
- Coordinates: 38°54′59″N 97°12′54″W
- Area: less than one acre
- Built: 1928
- Built by: Johnson, G.A., & Sons
- Architect: Gilbert Stanley Underwood
- Architectural style: Mission/Spanish Revival, Spanish Colonial Revival
- NRHP reference No.: 92001175
- Added to NRHP: September 8, 1992

The Abilene Union Pacific Railroad Passenger Depot is a former railroad station that serves as the headquarters of the Abilene Convention and Visitors Bureau in Abilene, Kansas. The station was built in 1928 (though not opened until 1929) as a replacement for a three-story depot combined with a railroad hotel, originally built by the Kansas Pacific Railway. It was designed by Gilbert Stanley Underwood and was constructed by G.A. Johnson & Sons company in Chicago. It was designed in the Mission/Spanish Revival and Spanish Colonial Revival, as many Union Pacific stations were at the time. It is across from the junction of Northwest Second Street and Broadway

Though the address is given as being on Northwest Second Street and Broadway, it actually spans one block to the east to Spruce Street. The east parking lot reaches as far as K-15 (Buckeye Street), and the west parking lot reaches as far as Cedar Street across from the Union Pacific Freight Depot.

Former President Dwight David Eisenhower was said to have left the previous version of the station to get to West Point in 1911. His funeral train arrived at the existing station in 1969. Union Pacific terminated passenger service on May 1, 1971, surrendering most stations to Amtrak. Abilene was not one of those stations, yet they continued to own the station until 1986.

The depot was listed on the National Register of Historic Places on September 8, 1992.

== See also ==
- National Register of Historic Places listings in Dickinson County, Kansas
- Abilene Downtown Historic District

Preceding station	Union Pacific Railroad	Following station
Solomon toward Denver	Kansas Pacific Railway	Detroit toward Kansas City
