= Josephine Fagan =

American politician

Member of the Wyoming House of Representatives from the Niobrara County district
- In office 1933–1935 Serving with Dan Hanson

Personal details
- Party: Democratic
- Spouse: Thomas M. Fagan
- Profession: Politician

Josephine Fagan was an American politician from Lusk, Wyoming who served a single term in the Wyoming House of Representatives. She was elected in 1932, and represented Niobrara County from 1933 to 1935 (Note: According to the Wyoming Legislature, Josephine Fagan only served in 1933.) as a Democrat in the 22nd Wyoming Legislature. Fagan represented Niobrara County alongside Dan Hanson.

Fagan was married to Thomas M. Fagan, who previously represented Niobrara County in the Wyoming House of Representatives from 1925 to 1927 (Note: According to the Wyoming Legislature, Thomas M. Fagan only served in 1925.) as a Democrat in the 18th legislature.

== See also ==
- Thomas M. Fagan, Fagan's husband, who also represented Niobrara County as a Democrat in the Wyoming House of Representatives

== Notes ==
Wyoming House of Representatives
Preceded by —	Member of the Wyoming House of Representatives from the Niobrara County district 1933–1935; Served alongside: Dan Hanson	Succeeded by —
