= C and H Refinery Historic District =

Historic district in Wyoming, United States

- U.S. National Register of Historic Places
- U.S. Historic district
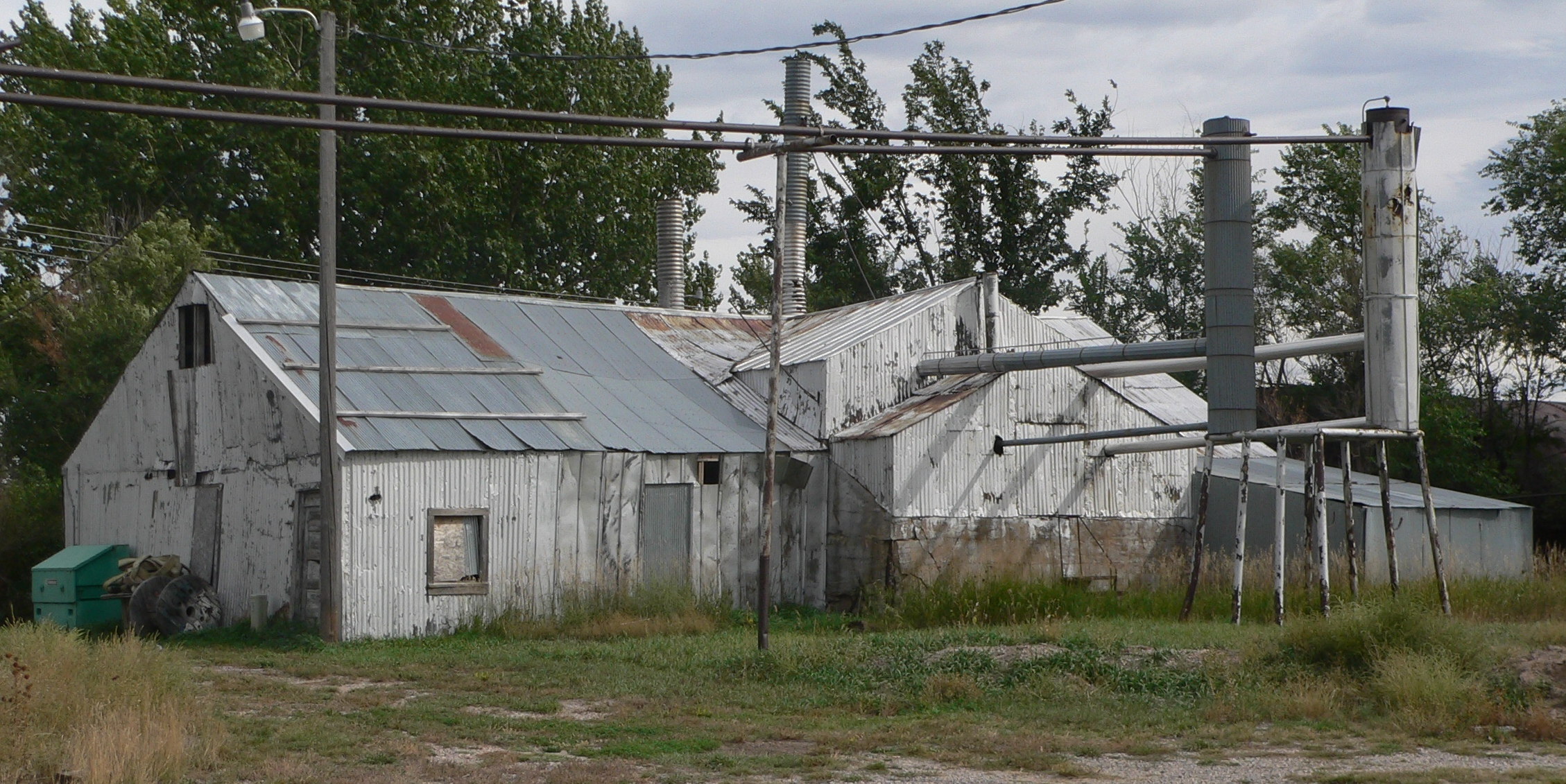
- Operations building at the refinery

- Location within Wyoming Location within the United States
- Location: 402 W. 8th St., Lusk, Wyoming
- Coordinates: 42°45′14″N 104°27′27.5″W
- Built: 1933
- Architectural style: Early Commercial, Bungalow/Craftsman
- NRHP reference No.: 00001672
- Added to NRHP: January 16, 2001

The C & H Refinery Historic District comprises an intact industrial complex in Lusk, Wyoming that documents an early 20th-century refinery. The C & H Refinery is noted as the smallest functioning oil refinery in the world, and may be the only remaining thermal distillation refinery, all other refineries having modernized to the catalytic cracking method.

The refinery processed oil produced at the Lance Creek Oil Field, which produced a paraffin-based high gravity "sweet" (low-sulfur) oil that could easily be processed through simple means. The Ohio Oil Company controlled the field and piped its product to markets in the U.S. Midwest. A part-time Ohio Oil employee, Roy Chamberlain, obtained permission to use oil from the Lance Creek pipeline and refine it. Using salvaged equipment from the defunct Pennsylvanian Belgo-American Refinery in Casper, Chamberlain and his partner James Hoblit built their refinery in 1933 in Lusk on a 1.5 acres (0.61 ha) site. Some of the equipment used by the C & H had been made as early as 1886.

Chamberlain sold his interest to Hoblit in 1935 and used the proceeds to buy the Ranger Hotel in Lusk. He went on to be elected state senator and founded the Ranger Oil Company. Hoblitt and his family retained the refinery until 1974.

The property was listed on the National Register of Historic Places in 2001.
