= Lusk Water Tower =

- U.S. National Register of Historic Places
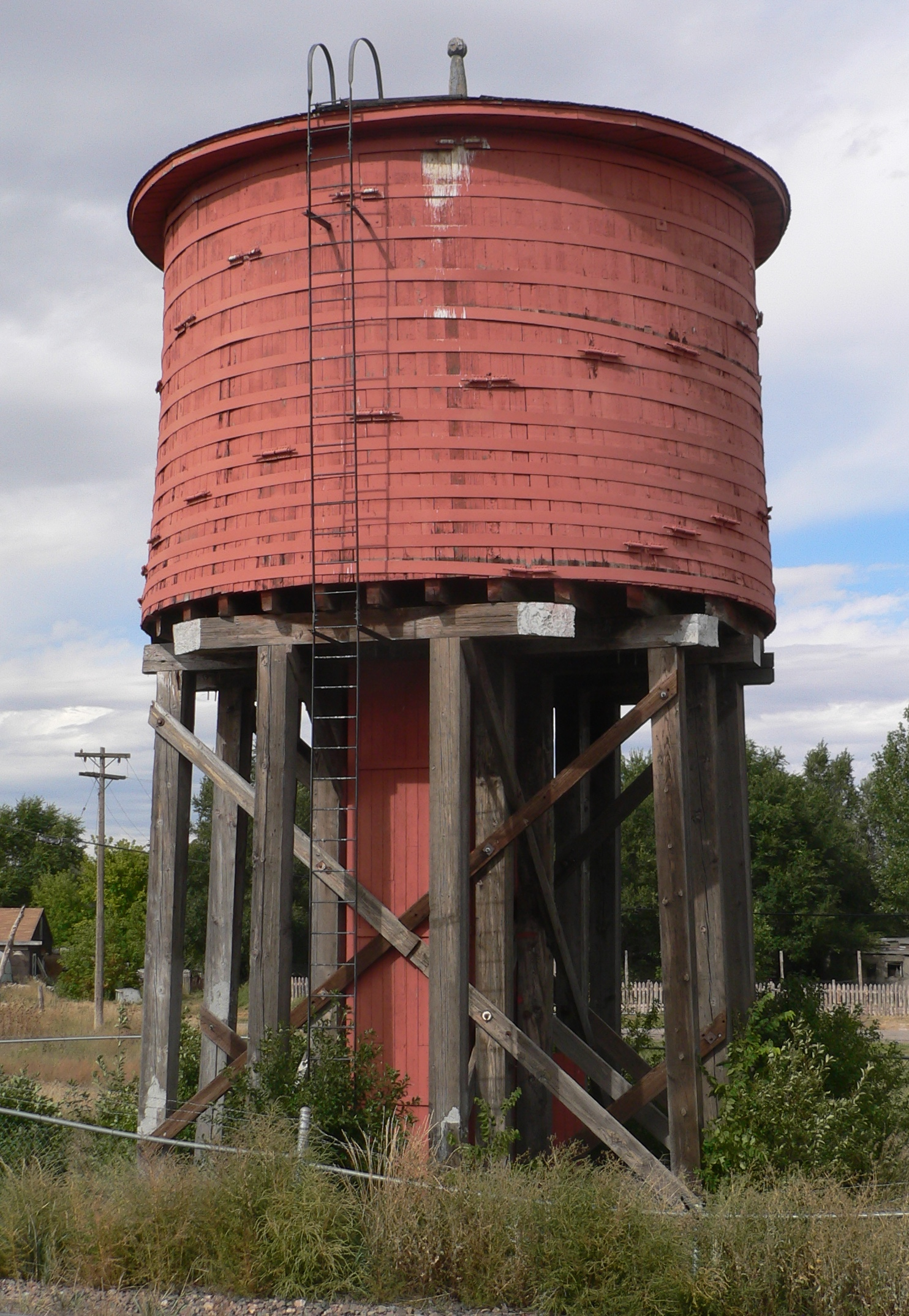

- Location within Wyoming Location within the United States
- Location: Along C & NW RR tracks across from US 20, Lusk, Wyoming
- Coordinates: 42°45′46.25″N 104°26′34.0″W
- Built: 1886, moved 1919
- Architect: Fremont, Elkhorn & Missouri Valley Ra
- NRHP reference No.: 91000997
- Added to NRHP: August 12, 1991

The Lusk Water Tower was built in 1886 to provide water for steam locomotives on the former Fremont, Elkhorn and Missouri Valley Railroad, at Lusk, Wyoming. Lusk itself was built by the railroad at the same time. The tank was originally located in the middle of Lusk near the railroad depot and was moved in 1919 to the present site on the east edge of town, adjacent to what became the Chicago and North Western Transportation Company line now owned by Union Pacific.

The wooden tower is round, with a diameter of about 25 feet (7.6 m). The tank is about 25 feet (7.6 m) high on a 25-foot (7.6 m) base. The structure is believed to be composed of Douglas fir, while the tank itself is redwood. It is the only surviving structure of its kind in Wyoming.

The water tower was placed on the National Register of Historic Places in 1991.
