= Abilene Union Pacific Railroad Freight Depot =

- U.S. National Register of Historic Places
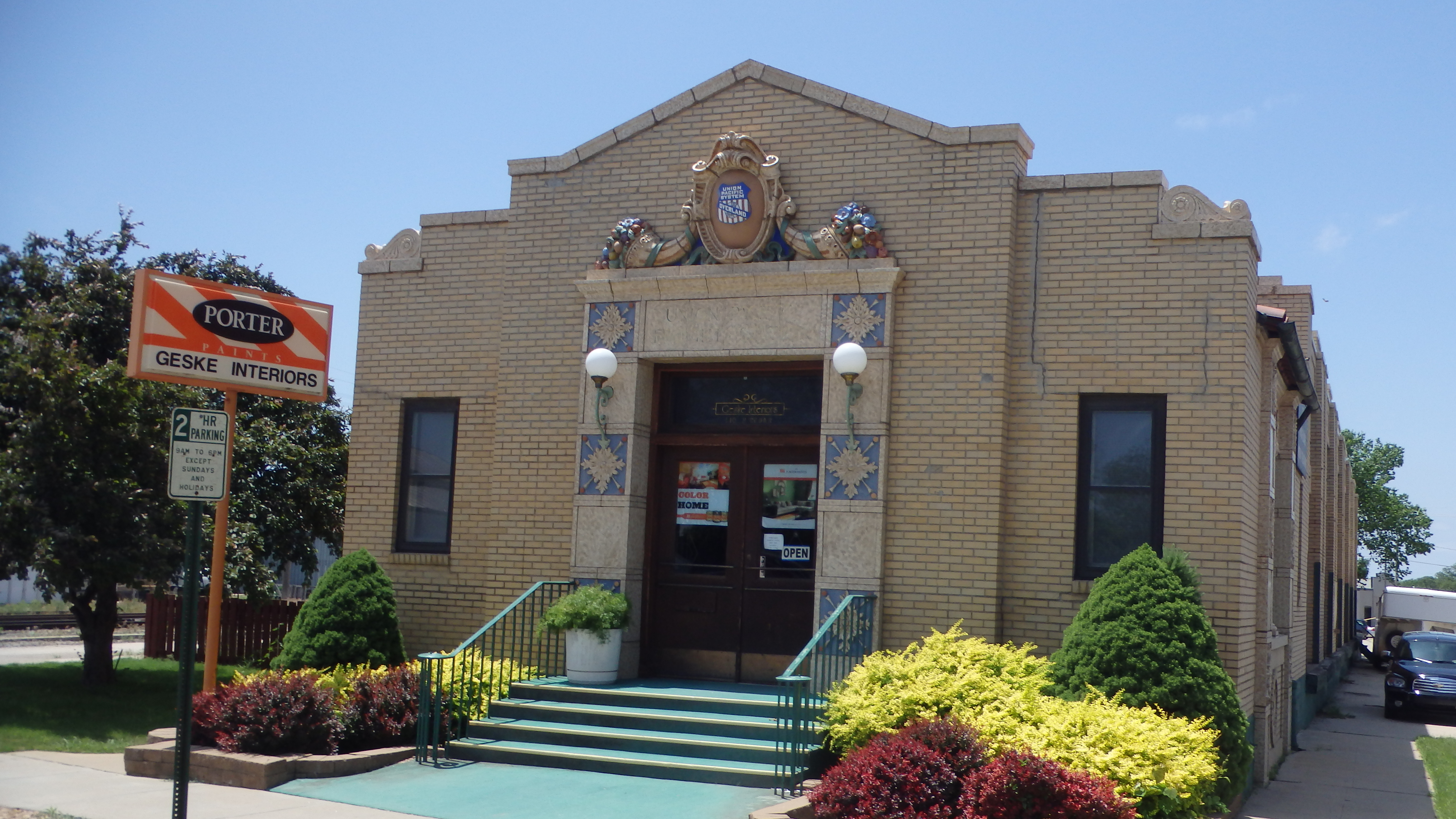
- The station as seen in 2014

- Location within Kansas
- Location: 110 N. Cedar St., Abilene, Kansas
- Coordinates: 38°54′58″N 97°13′01″W
- Area: less than one acre
- Built: 1928
- Built by: Johnson, G.A., & Sons
- Architect: Gilbert Stanley Underwood
- Architectural style: Mission/Spanish Revival
- NRHP reference No.: 93000894-*
- Added to NRHP: September 2, 1993

The Abilene Union Pacific Railroad Freight Depot is a historic railroad freight depot located at 110 North Cedar Street on the southwest corner of Northwest Second Street in Abilene, Kansas. Like the passenger depot nearby, it was originally built in 1928 (though not opened until 1929), designed by Gilbert Stanley Underwood and was constructed by G.A. Johnson & Sons company in Chicago. The depot was in the Mission/Spanish Revival architectural style, though it also contains some Greek revival elements.

The station began to decline in the post-World War 2 era, when railroads were focusing on receiving more of their freight through yards and industrial sidings. Union Pacific sold the freight house to Abilene Iron and Metal in 1974. In 1980 it was sold to a man named Gordon Davis Jr., who himself sold the building to painting contractor Tim Geske in 1987. It was listed on the National Register of Historic Places on September 2, 1993. Today, the station serves as a paint and hardware store.

== See also ==
- National Register of Historic Places listings in Dickinson County, Kansas
- Abilene Downtown Historic District
