= Wyoming Central Railway =

American railroad

Wyoming Central Railway was a railroad in the U.S. state of Wyoming. The railroad was incorporated in October 1885 and built a line from Chadron, Nebraska through Douglas to Casper. The line was initially leased to the Fremont, Elkhorn and Missouri Valley Railroad and the two railroads consolidated in 1891. The FE&MV was merged into Chicago and North Western Transportation Company in 1903 and the line was extended to Lander.

== History ==
In 1885 the laws of the Wyoming Territory required railroads building or operating in the territory to be incorporated in the territory. In order to extend the line west from Nebraska, the Fremont, Elkhorn and Missouri Valley Railroad incorporated Wyoming Central Railway as a dummy firm based in the town of Lusk which was laid out by the railroad in July 1886. Local landowner Frank S. Lusk was named as a director and only resident stockholder of the Wyoming Central company. The line was rapidly extended to the new town of Douglas near the former location of Fort Fetterman. In 1887 the line was constructed to Glenrock. In June 1888 the railroad reached the future site of the town of Casper which was platted out by the railroad at the end of 1888. The town was named for nearby Fort Caspar which was an important stop on the Oregon Trail.

The primary commodity on the line was coal, but other goods such as livestock were also transported. In his arguments to convince Union Pacific to build a line north out of Cheyenne, territorial Governor Francis E. Warren estimated that Wyoming Central was shipping $300,000 worth of cattle east through Nebraska instead of Cheyenne. Eventually, the threat of Wyoming Central dominating northeastern Wyoming prompted Union Pacific to establish the Cheyenne and Northern Railway which attempted to reach Douglas first, but failed. The C&N eventually only extended as far as Wendover on the North Platte River. When Union Pacific took over the C&N in 1887 they extended it to tie into the Wyoming Central line at Orin.

From its inception the line was leased to the FE&MV and in 1891 the two railroads were consolidated under the FE&MV name. In 1903 the FE&MV merged with the Chicago and Northwestern railway. The C&NW eventually extended the line to Shoshoni and Riverton in 1905 and Lander in 1906. In 1943 the line west of Casper was abandoned and salvaged. When Union Pacific merged with the C&NW in 1995, UP announced its intention to abandon the portion of the line from Orin to Casper.
