= John W. Birchmore House =

Historic house in Kansas, United States

- U.S. National Register of Historic Places
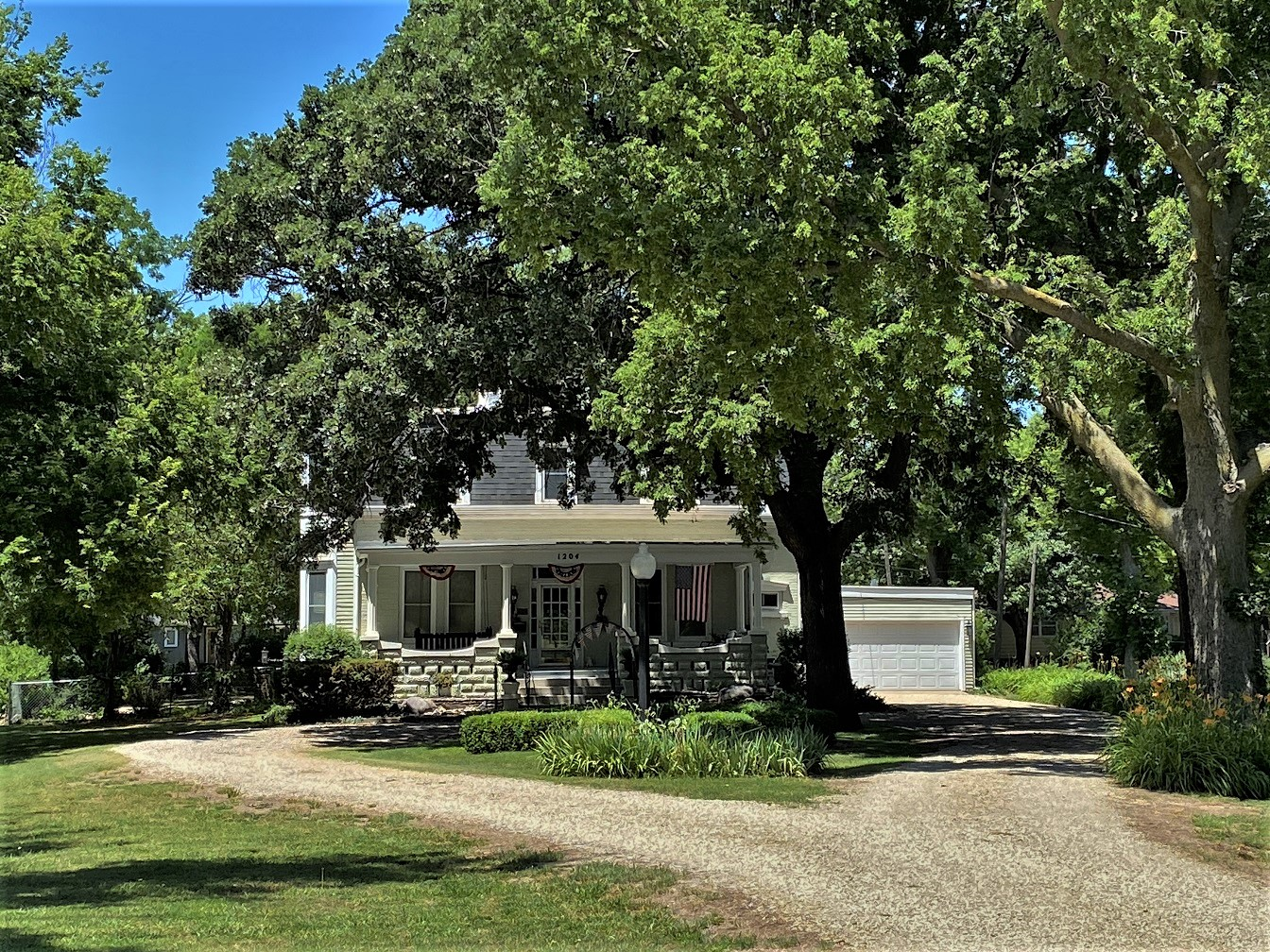

- Location within Kansas Location within the United States
- Location: 1204 N. Buckeye Ave. Abilene, Kansas
- Coordinates: 38°55′39″N 97°12′53″W
- Area: less than one acre
- Architectural style: Second Empire
- NRHP reference No.: 14000116
- Added to NRHP: April 7, 2014

The John W. Birchmore House in Abilene, Kansas was built in 1878. It was listed on the National Register of Historic Places in 2014.

It is a two-story brick Second Empire-style house. It was deemed notable as "a good example of the Second Empire style executed on a single-family residence in Abilene."
