= Trinity Lutheran Church (Abilene, Kansas) =

Historic church in Kansas, United States

- U.S. National Register of Historic Places
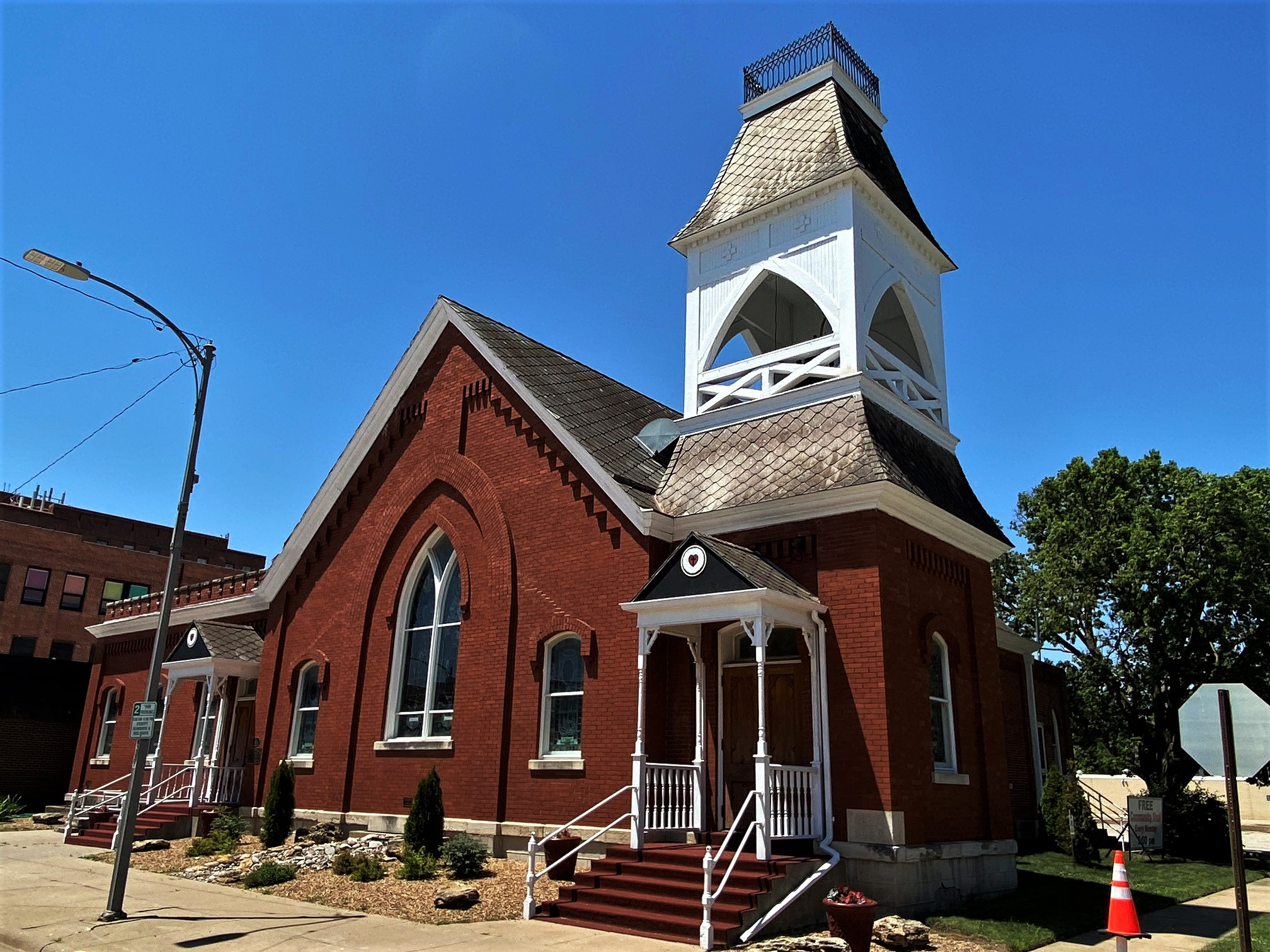
- Trinity Lutheran Church in 2021

- Location within Kansas Location within the United States
- Location: 320 N. Cedar St. Abilene, Kansas
- Coordinates: 38°55′5″N 97°13′0″W
- Area: less than one acre
- Built: 1878
- Architects: Hallock & Presney; Harris, W.E.
- Architectural style: Late Gothic Revival
- NRHP reference No.: 06000965
- Added to NRHP: November 1, 2006

Trinity Lutheran Church, formerly known as Trinity Evangelical Lutheran Church, is a church in Abilene, Kansas. The church was previously under the jurisdiction of the Evangelical Lutheran Church in America, until it switched its affiliation in 2017 to the North American Lutheran Church. It is listed on the National Register of Historic Places.

Its sanctuary is a 40 by 60 feet (12 m × 18 m) red brick building upon a limestone foundation which was completed in 1878. Additions in 1907 and 1932 expanded the building. A 1973 one-story building is connected by a walkway.
