= Staatz House =

Historic house in Kansas, United States

- U.S. National Register of Historic Places
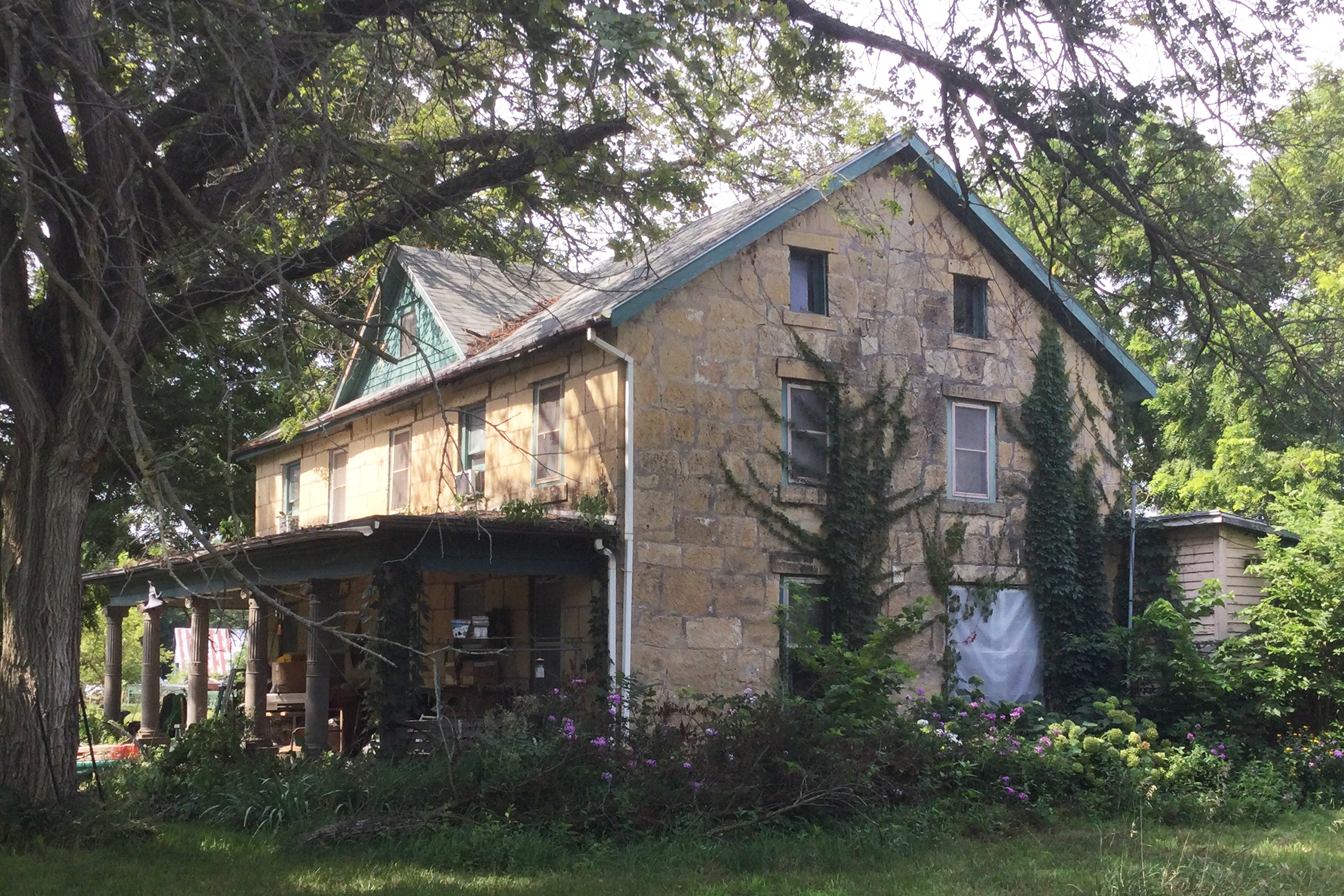

- Location within Kansas Location within the United States
- Location: 1824 Wolf Rd. Junction City, Kansas
- Coordinates: 38°51′41″N 96°55′34″W
- Area: less than one acre
- Built: 1867
- Architectural style: Massed form plan
- NRHP reference No.: 04001426
- Added to NRHP: February 4, 2005

The Staatz House, at 1824 Wolf Rd. in Junction City, Kansas, was built in about 1867. It was listed on the National Register of Historic Places in 2005.

The house is a two-story limestone side-gabled structure.

It was the home of Charles W. and Friederika Staatz, who migrated along with many other German Lutheran immigrants from Watertown, Wisconsin, to Kansas's Lyon Creek valley. Charles W. Staatz immigrated to the U.S. from East Prussia in 1851.
