= Versteeg-Swisher House =

Historic house in Kansas, United States

- Versteeg--Swisher House
- U.S. National Register of Historic Places
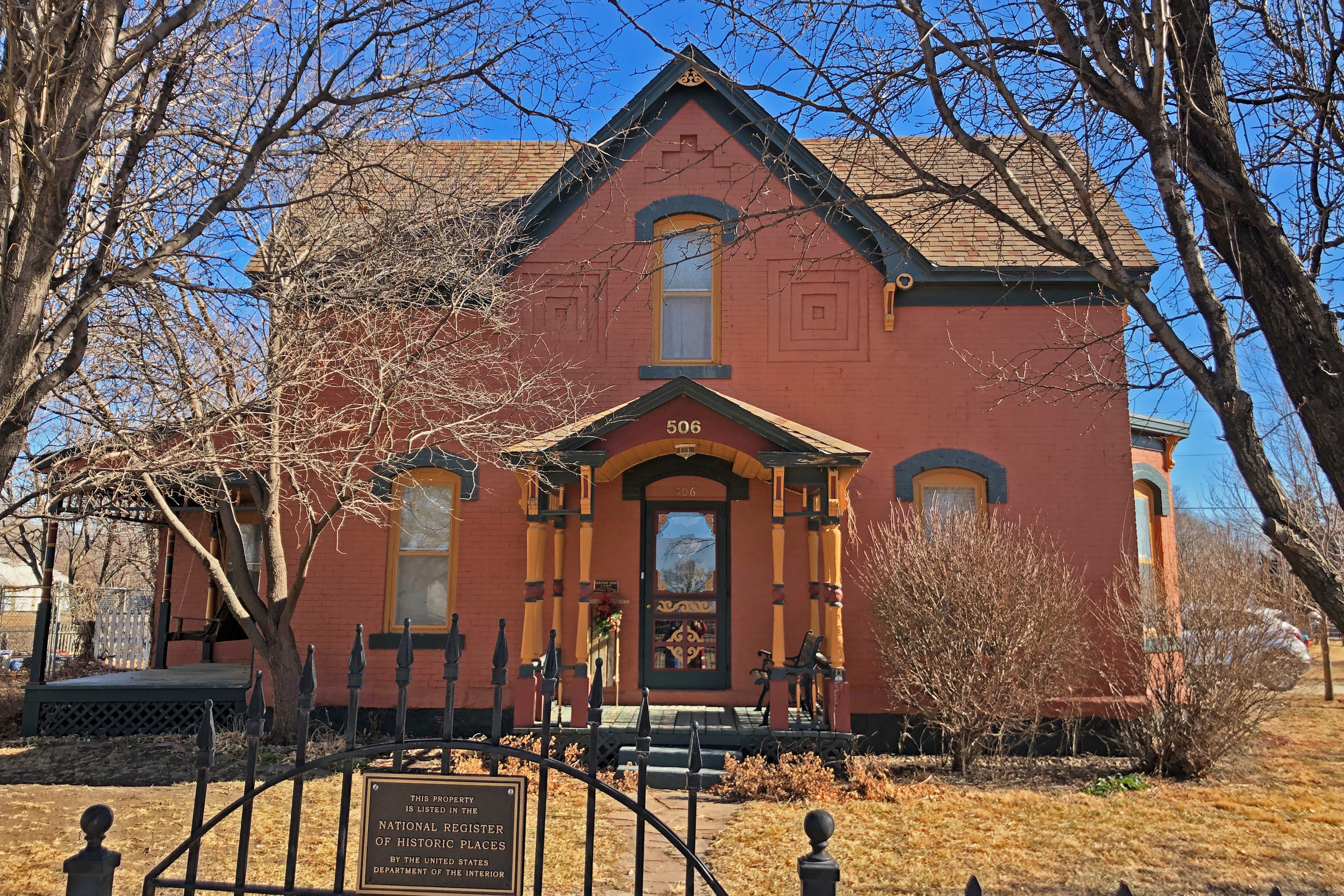

- Location within Kansas Location within the United States
- Location: 506 S. Campbell; Abilene, Kansas
- Coordinates: 38°54′36″N 97°12′14″W
- Area: less than one acre
- Built: c.1888; 138 years ago
- Architectural style: Gothic Revival
- NRHP reference No.: 05000201
- Added to NRHP: March 23, 2005

The Versteeg-Swisher House is a two-story brick Gothic Revival house on a limestone foundation located at 506 S. Campbell in Abilene, Kansas. It was built about 1888 by Dutch brickmaker Nicholas Versteeg and was listed on the National Register of Historic Places in 2005.
