= Medicine Bow station =

- Medicine Bow Union Pacific Depot
- U.S. National Register of Historic Places
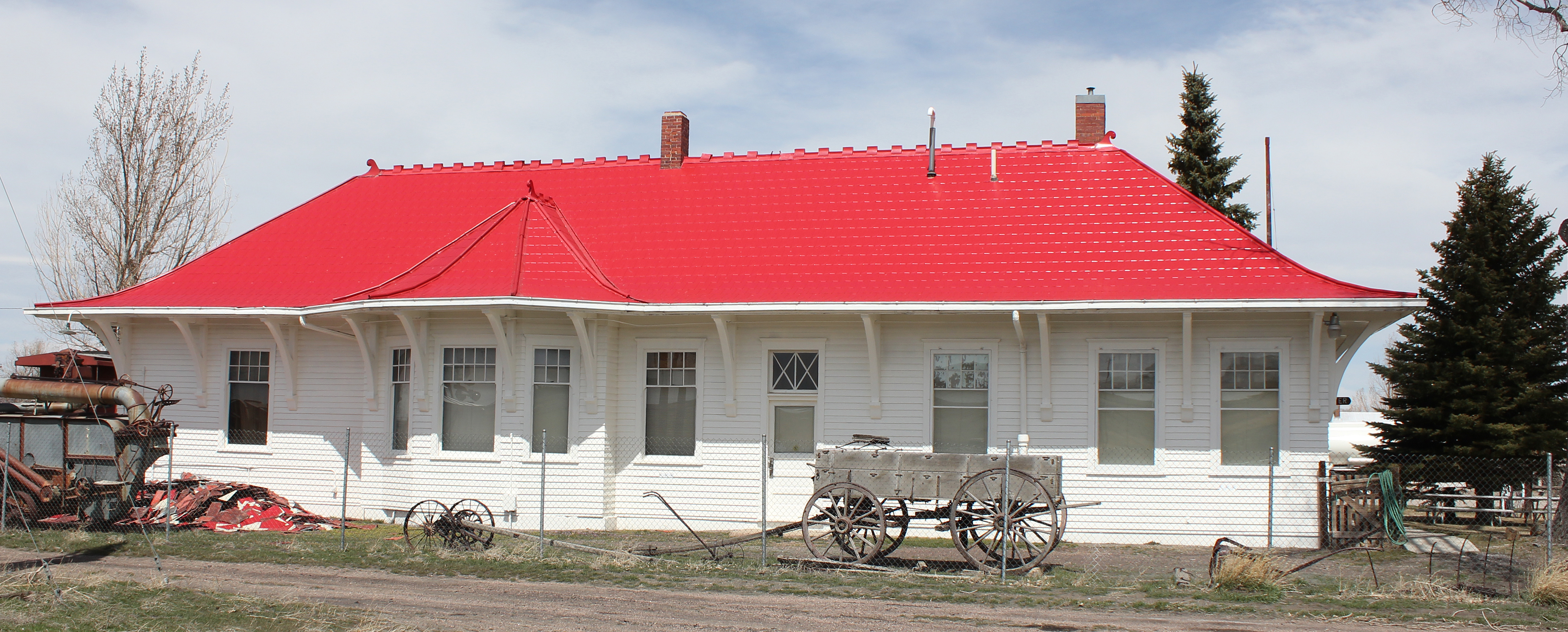
- The Medicine Bow Depot in 2014

- Location within Wyoming
- Location: 405 Lincoln Hwy., Medicine Bow, Wyoming
- Coordinates: 41°53′43″N 106°11′59″W
- Area: less than one acre
- Built: 1912
- NRHP reference No.: 82001832
- Added to NRHP: November 1, 1982

The Medicine Bow Union Pacific Depot was built 1912–1919 in Medicine Bow, Wyoming for the Union Pacific Railway. It is a typical example of Union Pacific railway architecture with a hipped clay shingle roof with broad overhangs supported by brackets over a one-story wood-frame station structure. The depot features a projecting bay designed to allow the station master to see incoming trains. The western section of the building contained the waiting room, the station office and a baggage room, while the eastern section contained living quarters for the stationmaster and his family. The station functioned in its original purpose until May 1981.

The Medicine Bow Depot was placed on the National Register of Historic Places on November 1, 1982. The building is occupied by the Medicine Bow Museum.

Preceding station	Union Pacific Railroad	Following station
Calvin toward Ogden	Overland Route	Ridge toward Council Bluffs Transfer
