= South Torrington station =

- South Torrington Union Pacific Depot
- U.S. National Register of Historic Places
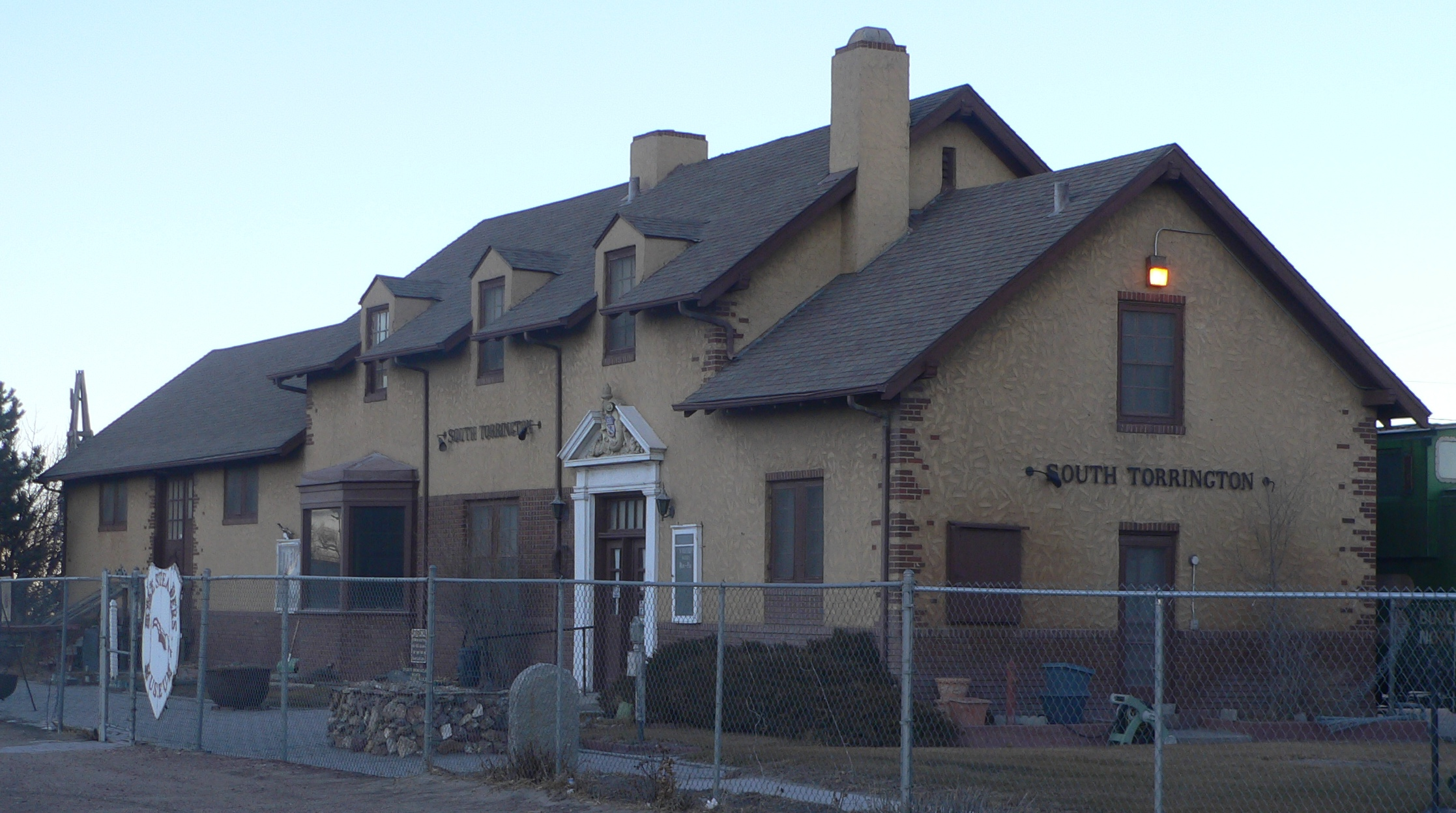
- South Torrington Union Pacific depot, now part of the Homesteaders Museum

- Location within Wyoming Location within the United States
- Location: U.S. 85, Torrington, Wyoming
- Coordinates: 42°2′53″N 104°11′1.3″W
- Built: 1926
- Architect: Underwood, Gilbert Stanley, & Co.
- Architectural style: Mission Revival-Spanish Colonial Revival
- NRHP reference No.: 74002025
- Added to NRHP: December 31, 1974

The South Torrington Union Pacific Depot was built in 1926 just to the south of Torrington, Wyoming. It was designed by Gilbert Stanley Underwood in the Mission Revival and Spanish Colonial Revival as a combined passenger and freight depot.

The line was principally intended to serve a sugar refinery in the vicinity. By 1928 it was extended to serve as a cutoff from the Union Pacific branch along the North Platte River to the main transcontinental line and was known as the North Platte Cutoff.

The ground level comprises a freight and baggage room, a holdover room and record room, agent's office, passenger waiting room, toilets and a hallway leading to the upstairs apartment. A basement includes a storage room and a furnace room. The upstairs portion contains living quarters for the station agent, including a living room, two bedrooms, a kitchen and a bathroom.

== Homesteaders Museum ==
The Homesteaders Museum is a museum of county and area railroad history located in the depot and adjacent buildings. The depot features a display of homesteading items and local memorabilia from the first settlement in 1834 up to 1976, when Homesteading ended. Also on display are a Lincoln Land Company house with artifacts from an early ranch family, an original homestead shack, a one-room schoolhouse, a Union Pacific Caboose with railroad items from the Union Pacific Railroad and Burlington Northern Railroad, a transportation building with vehicles, and railroad cars.

Preceding station	Union Pacific Railroad	Following station
Terminus	South Torrington - North Platte	Cottier toward North Platte
