= Rawhide Buttes =

Mountain range in Wyoming, USA

Coordinates: 42°35′11.66″N 104°29′32.12″W

Rawhide Buttes [el. 5,243 ft (1,598 m)] is a mountain range in Wyoming.

According to tradition, Rawhide Buttes was so named on account of a pioneer being skinned by Native Americans (Indians) there.
