= Rawhide Creek =

Stream in Nebraska, U.S.

Coordinates: 41.3424984°N 96.2994675°W

Rawhide Creek is a stream in Douglas, Washington, Dodge, and Colfax counties, Nebraska, in the United States.

According to legend, Rawhide Creek was named in about 1849 on account of a man who was skinned to death there by Indians, his hide was left as a warning to other settlers.

The “Legend” Rawhide is from Niobrara County Wyoming. Rawhide Creek's headwaters are located on Denny Ranch, Southwest of Lusk, Wyoming. The Legend of the Rawhide is re-enacted every July in Lusk.

== See also ==
- List of rivers of Nebraska
