= Fremont, Elkhorn and Missouri Valley Railroad =

The Fremont, Elkhorn and Missouri Valley Railroad (FE&MV), sometimes called "the Elkhorn," was a railroad established in 1869 in the state of Nebraska in the Midwestern United States.

== About ==
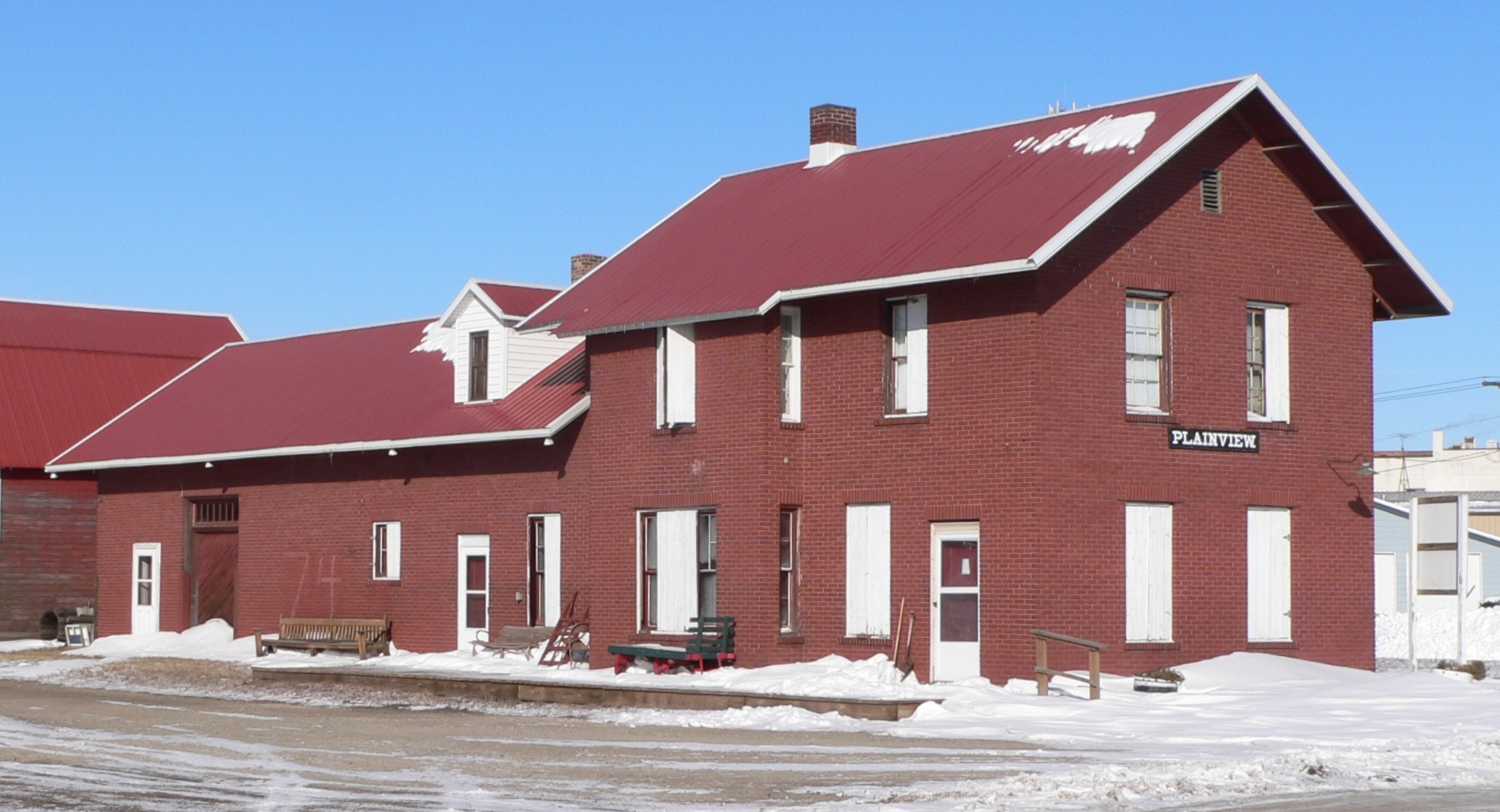
The FE&MV depot in Plainview, Nebraska is now part of the Plainview Historical Museum

The company constructed several lines in Nebraska, including a long east–west route from Omaha across northern Nebraska to Chadron, trackage that later became known as the "Cowboy Line."

Beginning in the 1880s the FE&MV expanded north and west from Chadron, building a line along the eastern edge of the Black Hills to Rapid City and Belle Fourche, South Dakota, as well as a line westward to Casper, Wyoming.

Charles Henry King, grandfather of President Gerald Ford, was to make his fortune establishing banks and freighting services in towns he helped found along the line including Chadron and Casper. Ford's father Leslie Lynch King, Sr. was born in Chadron during this time.

The larger Chicago and North Western Railway (C&NW) acquired control of the FE&MV in the late 19th century, and in 1903, the FE&MV was formally absorbed into the C&NW. The FE&MV's passenger depot in Douglas, Wyoming is listed in the National Register of Historic Places. Today, much of the FE&MV trackage has been abandoned.

The trackage through Rapid City is operated by the Rapid City, Pierre and Eastern Railroad.

== Track segment abandonments and sales ==
- Fremont, Nebraska-Norfolk, Nebraska; Abandoned 1982. Fremont to West Point sold to Fremont and Elkhorn Valley Railroad 1985. Hooper to West Point dismantled 1988.
- Norfolk-Chadron, Nebraska; Sold: Chadron-Merriman; Abandoned: Norfolk-Merriman 1992
- Chadron-northeastern Wyoming (Rapid City Branchline); Sold: Dakota, Minnesota and Eastern Railroad in 1996; to Canadian Pacific Railway in 2008; to Rapid City, Pierre and Eastern in 2014.
- Norfolk, Nebraska to Winner, South Dakota—Abandoned—1978
- Chadron-Lander, Wyoming; Abandoned: Chadron-Lander 1992

== See also ==
- Fremont and Elkhorn Valley Railroad (FEVR), a 17-mile tourist railroad running between Fremont and Hooper, a segment of former FE&MV line abandoned by the C&NW in 1982.
- Sorenson Parkway, a modern roadway located along 5-miles of former FE&MV line in North Omaha.
- Canadian Pacific Railway, successor to the Dakota, Minnesota & Eastern From Chadron, Nebraska to Northeastern Wyoming.
