= Abilene Downtown Historic District =

Historic district in Kansas, United States

- U.S. National Register of Historic Places
- U.S. Historic district
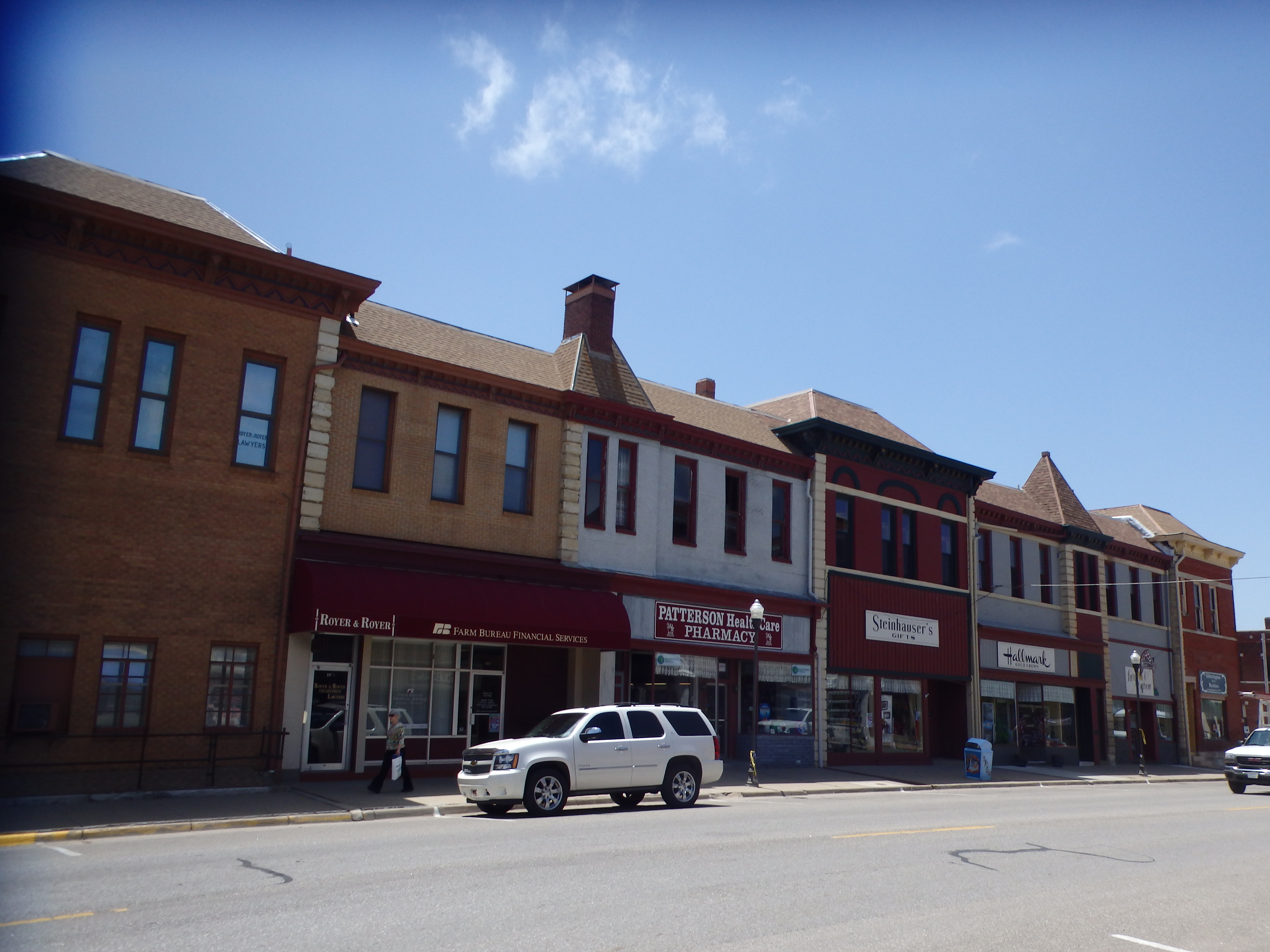

- Location within Kansas Location within the United States
- Location: Roughly bounded by Northeast 4th, West 1st, South Walnut, and North Olive Street, Abilene, Kansas
- Coordinates: 38°55′02″N 97°12′51″W
- Area: 45 acres (18 ha)
- Architect: Gilbert Stanley Underwood; Cayton & Murray
- Architectural style: Italianate, Classical Revival
- NRHP reference No.: 09000673
- Added to NRHP: September 1, 2009

The Abilene Downtown Historic District is a historic district in Abilene, Kansas which was listed on the National Register of Historic Places in 2009. The district is roughly bounded by Northeast 4th, West 1st, South Walnut, and North Olive Street.

The 45 acres (18 ha) listed area included 75 contributing buildings and four contributing structures, as well as 35 non-contributing buildings.

It includes Italianate and Classical Revival architecture, including works by Gilbert Stanley Underwood and Cayton & Murcay.

It includes a city hall, a courthouse, a post office, and commercial buildings for specialty stores, banks and other businesses. Nine buildings in the district were already separately listed on the National Register.
