= Cheyenne–Black Hills Stage Route and Rawhide Buttes and Running Water Stage Stations =

- U.S. National Register of Historic Places
- U.S. Historic district
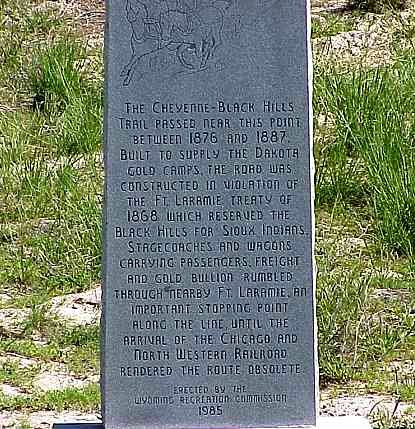
- Marker along the trail near Fort Laramie

- Location within Wyoming Location within the United States
- Nearest city: Lusk, Wyoming
- Coordinates: 42°46′12″N 104°28′30″W
- Built: 1876
- NRHP reference No.: 69000190
- Added to NRHP: April 16, 1969

The Rawhide Buttes Stage Station, the Running Water Stage Station and the Cheyenne–Black Hills Stage Route comprise a historic district that commemorates the stagecoach route between Cheyenne, Wyoming, and Deadwood, South Dakota, United States. The route operated beginning in 1876, during the height of the Black Hills Gold Rush, and was replaced in 1887 by a railroad.

The Rawhide Buttes station was demolished in 1973 after having functioned as a ranch headquarters. The ruin of the stage station barn is the only remnant of the Running Water Station, which stood about 15 miles (24 km) north of Rawhide Butte near the stage route's intersection with the Texas Trail. Running Water saw a minor mining boom during the 1880s, but was superseded by Lusk.

The district was listed on the National Register of Historic Places in 1969.
