= Lusk, Wyoming =

- Town
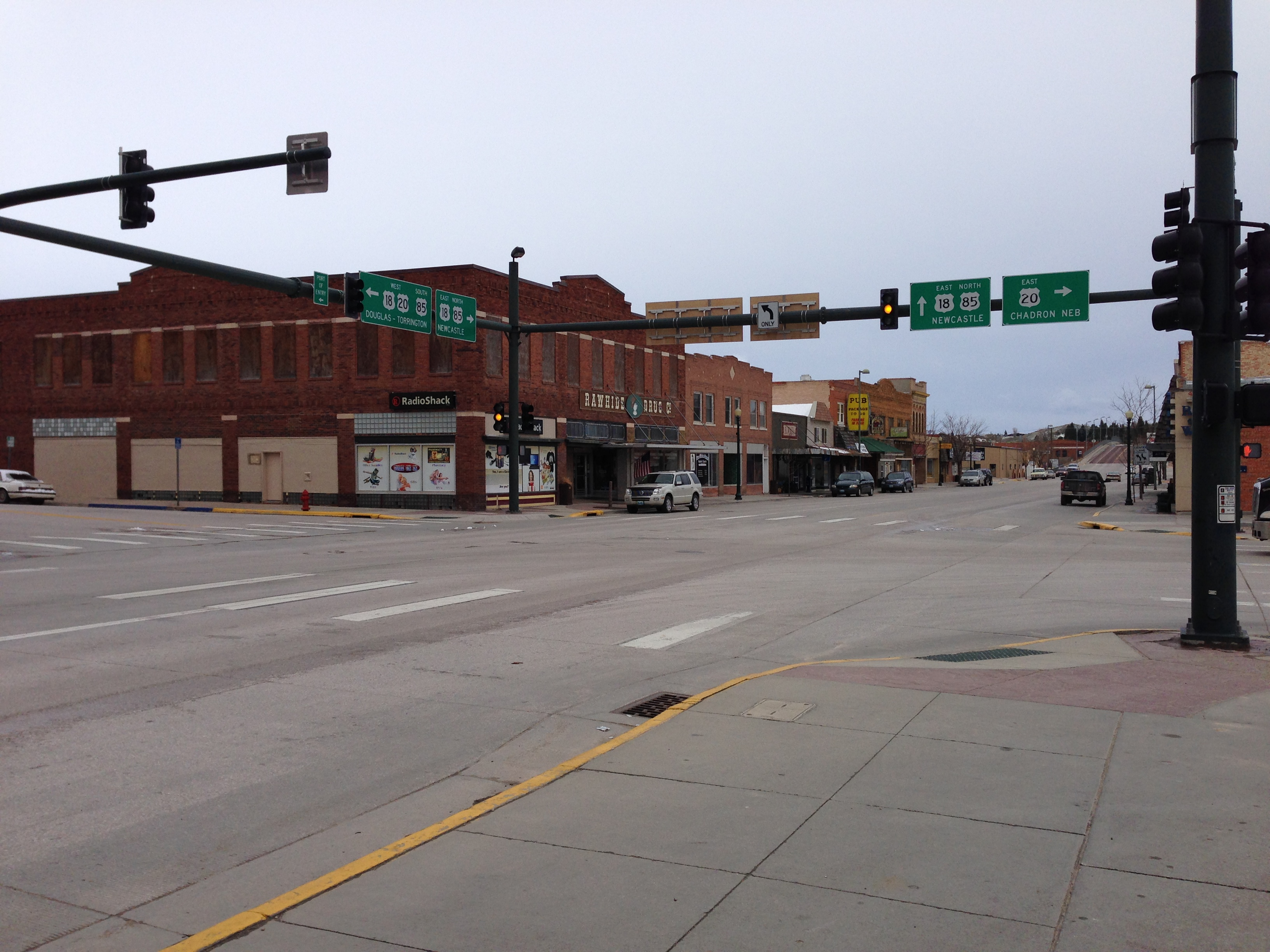
- Downtown. Intersection of US Highways 18, 20, and 85
- Motto: "The Little Town With Big Possibilities"
- Location of Lusk in Niobrara County, Wyoming
- Coordinates: 42°45′21″N 104°27′20″W
- Country: United States
- State: Wyoming
- County: Niobrara
- Incorporated: 1886

Government
  - Type: City Council
  - Mayor: Doug Lytle

Area
  - Total: 2.07 sq mi (5.36 km^{2})
  - Land: 2.07 sq mi (5.36 km^{2})
  - Water: 0 sq mi (0.00 km^{2})
- Elevation: 5,020 ft (1,530 m)

Population (2020)
  - Total: 1,541
  - Density: 745/sq mi (287.7/km^{2})
- Time zone: UTC-7 (Mountain (MST))
  - Summer (DST): UTC-6 (MDT)
- ZIP code: 82225
- Area code: 307
- FIPS code: 56-48530
- GNIS feature ID: 2412924
- Website: Town of Lusk, Wyoming

Lusk is a town in and the county seat of Niobrara County, Wyoming. It is located in the High Plains. The town was founded in July 1886, by Frank S. Lusk, a renowned Wyoming rancher, partner in the Western Live Stock Company, and stockholder in the Wyoming Central Railway. Cattle ranching remains the primary industry in the town of Lusk.

The population was 1,541 at the 2020 census. The town of Lusk is known for being the county seat of the least populated county in the least populated state in the US.

== History ==
The Black Hills Gold Rush brought fortune seekers to the Wyoming Territory. Within two years, the stage coach route between Cheyenne, Wyoming, and Deadwood, South Dakota, delivered freight, including salt pork and whiskey. The boom also brought armored stage coaches and gold bricks, along with Indians and thieves. The Cheyenne–Deadwood route operated from 1876 to 1887, when it was replaced by the Wyoming Central Railway.

=== Frank S. Lusk ===
Frank S. Lusk (1857–1930) was a Wyoming rancher and stockholder in the Wyoming Central Railway. Initially residing in Cleveland, Ohio, he moved to Denver, Colorado in 1876 and built the Western Live Stock Company under a partnership agreement and established a ranch east of Greeley. In 1877, Lusk traveled to the Wyoming Territory for the first time on personal business and left highly impressed with the people and the area. In 1879, eastern Colorado had grown to the point that Lusk, along with his partners began exploring options outside of the area. His thoughts were recorded in the 1923 Annals of Wyoming: Quarterly Bulletin:

My partners were favorable to moving into eastern Colorado near the Nebraska state line but I remembered the people I had met earlier in Wyoming and those I had subsequently met were a fine class of people and I decided we would go to Wyoming.

—Frank S. Lusk

Lusk and the Western Live Stock Company arrived in the Wyoming Territory in 1880 via Denver, establishing the Node Ranch, about 15 miles (24 km) east of present-day Lusk. A year later, he bought some land about 3 miles (5 km) outside of Lusk, which included the Running Water Stage Station. Buildings on the land included a stone barn and shelters that had been used by the Cheyenne–Deadwood stage route. Lusk established a hay ranch on the property. He organized his horse ranch at the site of what would later become the town of Lusk.

=== Lusk Post Office ===
After establishing his three ranch properties, it became clear that the nearest post office was located in Rawhide Buttes, 15 miles (24 km) southeast of the hay ranch, actually Route 20. Collecting the mail required a ride of 40 miles (64 km) round trip. In response, one of the partners in the Gilmer and Salisbury Express Stage told Lusk that he should set up a post office at the ranch, which would provide for delivery of the mail, rather than requiring him to make the ride to Rawhide Buttes. When Lusk sent in the application to the Post Office Department, everything was complete, but he didn't indicate a name for the post office. When asked about it later, Lusk told the star route representative that he was "busy and told him to do whatever he thought would, without a doubt, establish a post office for us. He told me he had suggested that it be called 'Lusk' and in due course of time it was so established".

=== Wyoming Central Railway ===
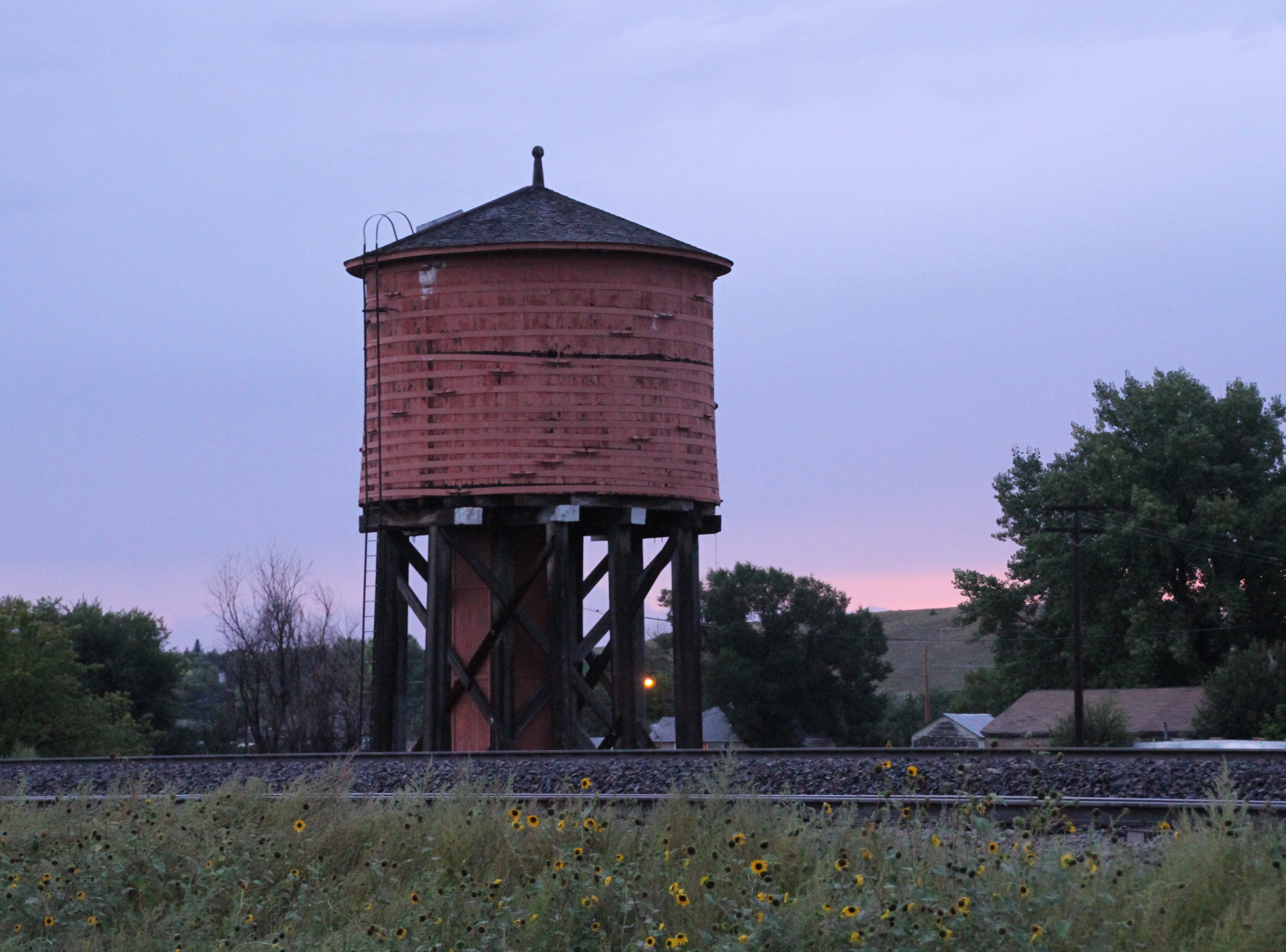
Lusk Water Tower, built in 1886 to provide water for steam locomotives

In 1886, the Fremont, Elkhorn and Missouri Valley Railroad wanted to extend their line west from Nebraska toward Casper, Wyoming, in order to transport coal. The territorial laws at that time required railroad companies to incorporate within the territory, before they were allowed to build or operate lines in the area. In order to meet the requirements allow construction and ownership, the Wyoming Central Railway was established as a dummy corporation. While Frank Lusk had been a successful cattleman, he was named as a director and only resident stockholder of the company. Letters of incorporation listed the base of operations as Lusk, Wyoming.

While Lusk was the only post office in Wyoming on the entire (proposed) line and was named as the place of business of the company in its incorporation papers, it wasn't officially established until July of that year, when railroad engineers laid the first plat for the town. That same year, the towns of Douglas and Casper were officially established in the same manner by Lusk on behalf of the Wyoming Central Railway.

After the turn of the century, there was another mining boom. Silver was discovered in the hills surrounding Lusk, which brought a steady stream of miners to the area. By the 1950s, growth in the area stabilized when cattle ranching usurped mining as the primary industry of the town.

In 1952, the Lusk Baptist Church sent letters to Representative William Henry Harrison III and Senators Joseph C. O'Mahoney and Lester C. Hunt protesting the creation of diplomatic relations with Vatican City through the appointment of Mark W. Clark.

== Geography ==
According to the United States Census Bureau, the town has a total area of 2.07 square miles (5.36 km^{2}), all land. The town is 20 miles (32 km) west of the Nebraska border and sits at 5,000 feet (1,500 m) above sea level, surrounded by the southeastern extension of the Black Hills National Forest.

=== Climate ===
Lusk experiences a dry humid continental climate (Köppen climate classification Dfb) with cold, dry winters and hot, humid summers.

Climate data for Lusk, Wyoming
Month	Jan	Feb	Mar	Apr	May	Jun	Jul	Aug	Sep	Oct	Nov	Dec	Year
Record high °F (°C)	69 (21)	69 (21)	79 (26)	87 (31)	94 (34)	105 (41)	105 (41)	102 (39)	100 (38)	87 (31)	76 (24)	70 (21)	105 (41)
Mean daily maximum °F (°C)	33.6 (0.9)	38.3 (3.5)	45.7 (7.6)	54.7 (12.6)	64.6 (18.1)	75.7 (24.3)	83.3 (28.5)	82.5 (28.1)	72.6 (22.6)	59.9 (15.5)	43.3 (6.3)	35.7 (2.1)	57.5 (14.2)
Daily mean °F (°C)	21.9 (−5.6)	26.3 (−3.2)	33.2 (0.7)	41.7 (5.4)	51.3 (10.7)	61.3 (16.3)	68.0 (20.0)	66.7 (19.3)	56.8 (13.8)	45.0 (7.2)	31.0 (−0.6)	23.4 (−4.8)	43.9 (6.6)
Mean daily minimum °F (°C)	10.1 (−12.2)	14.3 (−9.8)	20.7 (−6.3)	28.6 (−1.9)	38.0 (3.3)	46.9 (8.3)	52.7 (11.5)	50.9 (10.5)	40.9 (4.9)	30.0 (−1.1)	18.6 (−7.4)	11.0 (−11.7)	30.2 (−1.0)
Record low °F (°C)	−38 (−39)	−33 (−36)	−20 (−29)	−9 (−23)	8 (−13)	24 (−4)	33 (1)	31 (−1)	6 (−14)	−8 (−22)	−24 (−31)	−36 (−38)	−38 (−39)
Average precipitation inches (mm)	0.59 (15)	0.62 (16)	1.23 (31)	2.25 (57)	2.74 (70)	2.13 (54)	1.96 (50)	1.00 (25)	1.29 (33)	1.28 (33)	0.77 (20)	0.65 (17)	16.51 (421)
Source 1: NOAA (normals, 1971–2000)
Source 2: The Weather Channel (Records)

== Demographics ==
Historical population
Census	Pop.	Note	%±
1890	253		—
1900	180		−28.9%
1910	414		130.0%
1920	2,092		405.3%
1930	1,218		−41.8%
1940	1,814		48.9%
1950	2,089		15.2%
1960	1,890		−9.5%
1970	1,495		−20.9%
1980	1,650		10.4%
1990	1,504		−8.8%
2000	1,447		−3.8%
2010	1,567		8.3%
2020	1,541		−1.7%
U.S. Decennial Census; 1870-2000 census

=== 2010 census ===
As of the census of 2010, there were 1,567 people, 658 households, and 373 families residing in the town. The population density was 757.0 inhabitants per square mile (292.3/km^{2}). There were 790 housing units at an average density of 381.6 units per square mile (147.3 units/km^{2}). The racial makeup of the town was 95.7% White, 0.3% African American, 1.1% Native American, 0.6% Asian, 0.6% from other races, and 1.9% from two or more races. Hispanic or Latino of any race were 2.5% of the population.

There were 658 households, of which 22.6% had children under the age of 18 living with them, 44.2% were married couples living together, 9.3% had a female householder with no husband present, 3.2% had a male householder with no wife present, and 43.3% were non-families. 39.5% of all households were made up of individuals, and 18.1% had someone living alone who was 65 years of age or older. The average household size was 2.06 and the average family size was 2.75.

The median age in the town was 43.5 years. 18.3% of residents were under the age of 18; 6.9% were between the ages of 18 and 24; 27% were from 25 to 44; 29.1% were from 45 to 64; and 18.7% were 65 years of age or older. The gender makeup of the town was 42.2% male and 57.8% female.

=== 2000 census ===
As of the census of 2000, there were 1,447 people, 611 households, and 381 families residing in the town. The population density was 721.7 people per square mile (278.6 people/km^{2}). There were 782 housing units at an average density of 390 units per square mile (150 units/km^{2}). The racial makeup of the town was 97.86% White, 0.21% African American, .62% Native American, .14% Asian, .41% from other races, and .76% from two or more races. Hispanic or Latino of any race were 1.59% of the population.

There were 611 households, out of which 27 percent had children under the age of 18 living with them, 50.7% were married couples living together, 8% had a female householder with no husband present, and 37.5% were non-families. Individuals living alone accounted for 35% of all households, and 17% of those living alone were over the age of 65 years. The average household size was 2.2 and the average family size was 2.84.

Within the town limits, the population was spread out, with 22.4% under the age of 18, 7.7% between 18 and 24, 26.5% between 25 and 44, 24.1% between 45 and 64, and 19.2% who were over the age of 65 years. The median age was 42 years. For every 100 females, there were 82.5 males. For every 100 females age 18 and over, there were 74.7 males.

The median income for a household in the town was $29,760, and the median income for a family was $37,583. Males had a median income of $28,333 versus $17,188 for females. The per capita income for the town was $15,847. About 9.2% of families and 14.2% of the population were below the poverty line, including 22.7% of those under age 18 and 13.1% of those age 65 or over.

== Arts and culture ==
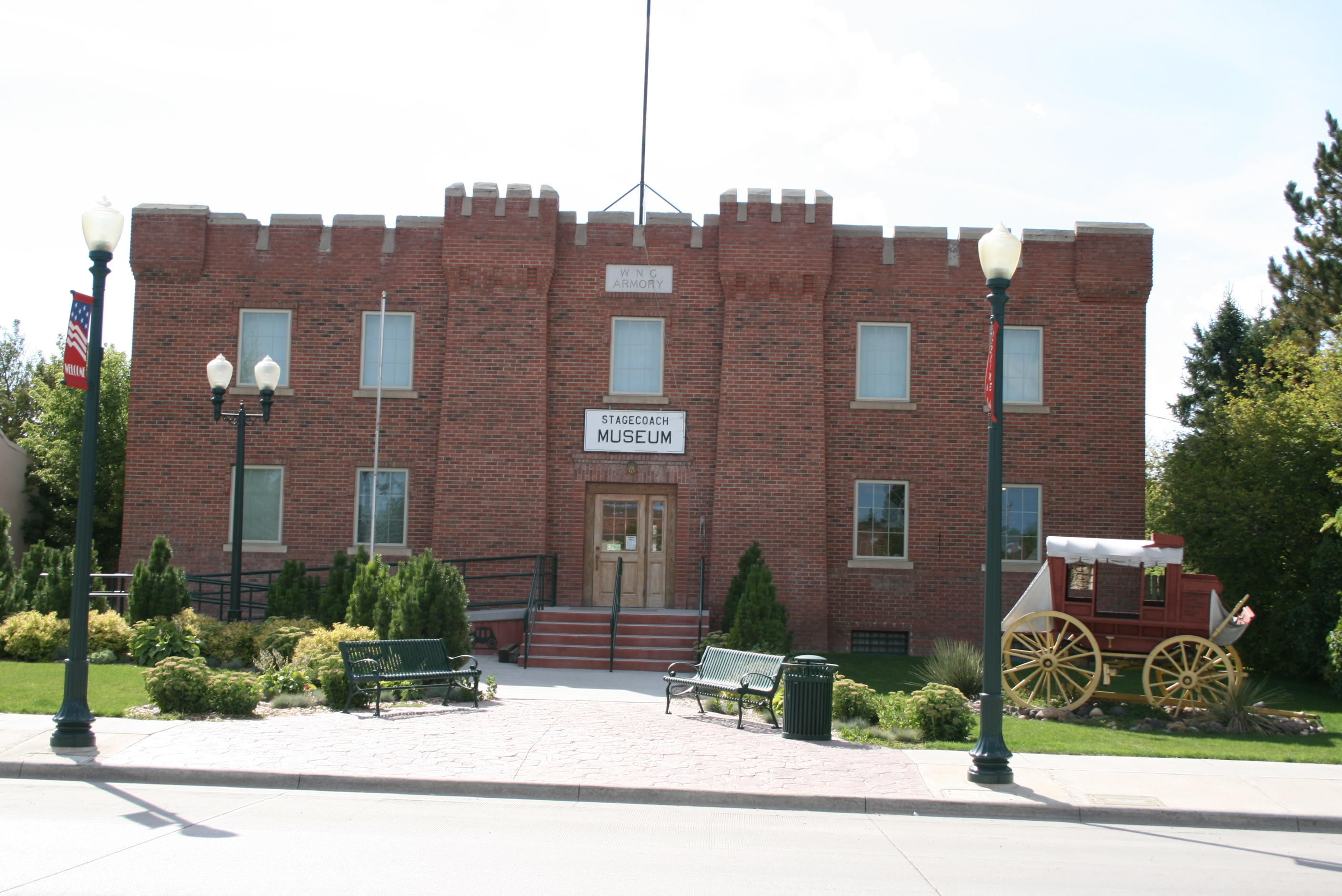
The Stagecoach Museum in a former Wyoming National Guard armory

Annual cultural events

- Legend of Rawhide

Museums and points of interest

- The Stagecoach Museum
- Silver Sage Bison Ranch
- Paleo Dinosaur Park
- The grave of Mother Featherlegs, located about ten miles south of the town of Lusk

== Parks and recreation ==
While the Parks Department offers recreational opportunities through the golf course and swimming pool, the Lusk Recreation Department offers competitive and noncompetitive sports programming for both youth and adults. Summer leagues include adult coed softball, and youth baseball and soccer. The department also presents a summer Art in the Park program.

The Parks and Recreation Department maintains the town swimming pool and three parks, including Washington Park, Northside Park, and Audrey Park. Open May through October, all the parks offer playground equipment. The swimming pool, known as "Lusk Plunge", is located at Northside Park. The department also maintains the nine-hole Lusk Municipal Golf Course. Opened in 1942, the course is located west of the town on Highway 273 and offers several tournaments a year.

== Municipal government ==
The municipal government of Lusk encompass a mayor and four council members, representing some citizens area wide. City officials are elected to four-year terms. Open public meetings are held on a monthly basis to receive feedback from citizens, address concerns, express collective decisions, and vote on motions, proposals, resolutions, and orders.

The Women's Center of the Wyoming Department of Corrections is located in Lusk. The center was initially operated by the Wyoming Board of Charities and Reform, until it was dissolved as a result of a State Constitutional Amendment passed in November 1990.

== Education ==
Public education in the town of Lusk, along with the rest of Niobrara County, is provided by Niobrara County School District #1. Local schools include Lusk Elementary/Middle School (grades K–8) and Niobrara County High School (grades 9–12). The Wyoming Virtual Academy, an online K-12 public school, is also based in Lusk.

Lusk has a public library, the Niobrara County Library.

== Media ==
The major daily newspaper in the town of Lusk is the Lusk Herald, owned by the News Media Corporation, which offers both print and online editions. Television broadcasting is offered through Comcast Cable, Dish Network, and DIRECTV service providers. While the town does not have local network affiliate stations, local and statewide news programming is offered through the ABC affiliate, KTWO-TV (Casper); FOX affiliate KLWY (Cheyenne); and CBS affiliate KGWN (Cheyenne).

== In popular culture ==
- Lusk is the hometown of the characters in the 2000 comedy Ready to Rumble.
- The town is mentioned in passing in S1E12 of Dead Like Me.

== Infrastructure ==
=== Highways ===
- U.S. Hwy 18 - concurrent with U.S. 20 West and U.S. 85 North.
- U.S. Hwy 20 - east–west route through Lusk.
- U.S. Hwy 85 - north–south route through Lusk.
- WYO 273 - runs through western edge of Lusk, from U.S. Hwy 20 to Niobrara Country Club.

A Tesla Supercharger with four stalls located on Main Street was opened in early 2014.

=== Local roads ===
- Beer Can Road – locally maintained road running east and north from the north end of Lusk.
- Twentyeight Road – locally maintained road running northwest from north end of Lusk.

=== Airport ===
The Department of Public Works operates and maintains the Lusk Municipal Airport, 3 miles (5 km) east of town.

=== Rail ===
Lusk is served by the Union Pacific line between Omaha and Casper.

=== Public transit ===
Niobrara Senior Center provides basic paratransit services for both Lusk and Niobrara County.

=== Utilities ===
The Department of Public Works maintains and delivers utility services within the town including water, electricity, streets, sewer, sanitation, landfill, and recycling.

=== Safety and healthcare ===
Safety and healthcare infrastructure include law enforcement, medical emergency transport, and fire protection, which is maintained through the Lusk Volunteer Fire Department. As of 2012, the department includes 21 fully trained and certified volunteer firefighters. Senior department officers provide training classes and certification through accreditation with the State of Wyoming, National Fire Protection Association, National Wildfire Coordinating Group, and National Fire Academy.

== Notable people ==
- Thomas Wilson Brown (born 1972), actor
- Dick Ellsworth (1940–2022), Major League Baseball pitcher
- Douglas W. Owsley (born 1951), forensic anthropologist
- James G. Watt (1938–2023), United States Secretary of the Interior for much of Ronald Reagan's first term
- Mother Featherlegs (?–1879), sex worker who lived near Lusk and was murdered during a robbery in 1879.
