= List of radio stations in Wyoming =

The following is a list of FCC-licensed radio stations in the U.S. state of Wyoming, which can be sorted by their call signs, frequencies, cities of license, licensees, and programming formats.

== List of radio stations ==
Call sign	Frequency	City of license	Licensee	Format
KADQ-FM	98.3 FM	Evanston	Frandsen Media Company, LLC	Classic rock
KAIW	88.9 FM	Saratoga	University of Wyoming	Public radio (NPR)
KAIX	88.3 FM	Casper	Educational Media Foundation	Worship music (Air1)
KAML-FM	97.3 FM	Gillette	Legend Communications of Wyoming, LLC	Top 40 (CHR)
KANT	104.1 FM	Guernsey	Peak Radio LLC	Adult hits
KARS-FM	102.9 FM	Laramie	The Fort Collins/Lafayette Divestiture Trust	Sports radio
KAPK	102.7 FM	Cora	Wind River Broadcasting Inc.	Country
KASL	1240 AM	Newcastle	Val Rasmuson Cook	Country
KASS	106.9 FM	Casper	Mt. Rushmore Broadcasting, Inc.	Classic rock
KAWR	98.7 FM	Reliance	Educational Media Foundation	Worship music (Air1)
KAXG	89.7 FM	Gillette	Hi-Line Radio Fellowship, Inc.	Christian
KAZY	93.7 FM	Cheyenne	Freisland Broadcasting Corp.	Active rock
KBBS	1450 AM	Buffalo	Legend Communications of Wyoming, LLC	Classic country
KBDY	102.1 FM	Hanna	Toga Radio LLC	Country
KBEN-FM	103.3 FM	Cowley	White Park Broadcasting, Inc.	Classic country
KBMG	106.3 FM	Evanston	Alpha Media Licensee LLC	Hispanic CHR
KBTG	88.3 FM	Buffalo	Buffalo Baptist Church	Religious
KBUW	90.5 FM	Buffalo	University of Wyoming	Public radio (NPR) HD
KBYA	89.9 FM	Afton	Brigham Young University – Idaho	Public radio
KCGL	104.1 FM	Powell	Legend Communications of Wyoming, LLC	Classic hits
KCGY	95.1 FM	Laramie	Townsquare License, LLC	Country
KCOV-LP	95.7 FM	Gillette	First Presbyterian Church	Religious
KCSP-FM	90.3 FM	Casper	Western Inspirational Broadcasters, Inc.	Contemporary Christian (Pilgrim Radio)
KCWB	92.1 FM	Byron	Legend Communications of Wyoming, LLC	Classic country
KCWC-FM	88.1 FM	Riverton	Central Wyoming College	College
KCYA	97.7 FM	Rolling Hills	Cochise Media Licenses LLC	Adult standards
KDDV-FM	101.5 FM	Wright	Legend Communications of Wyoming, LLC	Classic rock
KDJY	88.7 FM	Douglas	Hi-Line Radio Fellowship	Christian (Your Network of Praise)
KDLY	97.5 FM	Lander	Kairos Broadcasting, LLC	Country
KDNO	101.7 FM	Thermopolis	Edwards Communications LC	Classic country
KDNR	88.7 FM	South Greeley	Western Inspirational Broadcasters, Inc.	Contemporary Christian (Pilgrim Radio)
KDUW	91.7 FM	Douglas	University of Wyoming	Public radio (NPR) HD
KDWY	105.3 FM	Diamondville	SVI Media, LLC	Country
KERM	98.3 FM	Torrington	Kath Broadcasting Co, LLC	Country
KEUW	89.9 FM	Torrington	University of Wyoming	Public radio (NPR)
KFBC	1240 AM	Cheyenne	Montgomery Broadcasting L.L.C.	Sports (ISN)
KFBU	1630 AM	Fox Farm	Hi-Line Radio Fellowship, Inc.	Regional Mexican
KFCB-LP	105.1 FM	Douglas	Douglas Baptist Church, Inc.	Christian
KFCW	93.1 FM	Riverton	Edwards Communications LC	Classic rock
KFGR	88.1 FM	Powell	Trinity Bible Church	Religious
KFRZ	92.1 FM	Green River	Wagonwheel Communications Corp	Country
KFZE	104.3 FM	Daniel	Wagonwheel Communications Corporation	Country
KGAB	650 AM	Orchard Valley	Townsquare License, LLC	News Talk Information
KGCC	99.9 FM	Gillette	Keyhole Broadcasting, LLC	Classic rock
KGLL	88.1 FM	Gillette	Real Presence Radio	Religious
KGOS	1490 AM	Torrington	Kath Broadcasting Co, LLC	Country
KGRK	98.5 FM	Glenrock	Cochise Broadcasting LLC	Adult hits
KGWY	100.7 FM	Gillette	Legend Communications of Wyoming, LLC	Country
KHAT	1210 AM	Laramie	Appaloosa Broadcasting Company, Inc.	Country
KHNA-LP	94.3 FM	Sheridan	Aperio Radio, Inc.	Catholic
KHOC	102.5 FM	Casper	Mt. Rushmore Broadcasting, Inc.	Adult contemporary
KHOL	89.1 FM	Jackson	Jackson Hole Community Radio, Incorporated	Public radio
KHRW	92.7 FM	Ranchester	Legend Communications of Wyoming, LLC	Adult contemporary
KIGN	101.9 FM	Burns	Townsquare License, LLC	Classic rock
KIML	1270 AM	Gillette	Legend Communications of Wyoming, LLC	News Talk Information
KIMX	96.7 FM	Laramie	Appaloosa Broadcasting Company, Inc.	Top 40 (CHR)
KIQZ	92.7 FM	Rawlins	Mt. Rushmore Broadcasting, Inc.	Silent
KJAX	93.5 FM	Jackson	Jackson Hole Radio, LLC	Country
KJCV	1450 AM	Jackson	Community Broadcasting, Inc.	Religious
KJHB-LP	104.3 FM	Jackson	Teton County School District #1	Album-oriented rock
KJHR-LP	100.1 FM	Teton Village	Teton Village Association	Variety
KJNT	1490 AM	Jackson	Ted W. Austin, Jr.	Unknown
KJXN	105.1 FM	South Park	Cochise Media Licenses, LLC	Adult contemporary
KKLX	96.1 FM	Worland	Legend Communications of Wyoming, LLC	Hot adult contemporary
KKPL	99.9 FM	Cheyenne	Townsquare Media of Ft. Collins, Inc.	Hot adult contemporary
KKSG-LP	103.7 FM	Worland	Sovereign Grace Bible Church	Religious Teaching
KKTL	1400 AM	Casper	Townsquare License, LLC	Classic country
KKTS	1580 AM	Evansville	Douglas Broadcasting, Inc.	Hot adult contemporary
KKTS-FM	99.3 FM	Douglas	Douglas Broadcasting	Hot adult contemporary
KKTY	1470 AM	Douglas	Douglas Broadcasting, Inc.	Classic hits
KKTY-FM	100.1 FM	Glendo	Douglas Broadcasting, Inc.	Country
KKWY	88.1 FM	Wheatland	Cedar Cove Broadcasting, Inc.	Religious
KLED	93.3 FM	Antelope Valley-Crestview	Legend Communications of Wyoming, LLC	Classic country
KLEN	106.3 FM	Cheyenne	Townsquare License, LLC	Top 40 (CHR)
KLGT	96.5 FM	Buffalo	Legend Communications of Wyoming, LLC	Country
KLLM (FM)KLLM	96.5 FM	Wheatland	Mitchell Radio Company, LLC	Religious
KLMI	106.1 FM	Rock River	Wolf Creek Radio Broadcasting, LLC	Hits of the 80s, 90's and Now
KLOF	88.9 FM	Gillette	Educational Media Foundation	Contemporary Christian (K-Love)
KLQQ	104.9 FM	Clearmont	Lovcom, Inc.	Top 40 (CHR)
KLWC	89.1 FM	Casper	Educational Media Foundation	Contemporary Christian (K-Love)
KLWD	91.9 FM	Gillette	CSN International	Religious
KLWR	101.9 FM	North Rock Springs	Educational Media Foundation	Contemporary Christian (K-Love)
KLWV	90.9 FM	Chugwater	Educational Media Foundation	Contemporary Christian (K-Love)
KLZL-LP	90.7 FM	Ten Sleep	Paint Rock Radio	Religious Teaching
KMER	940 AM	Kemmerer	Star Valley Media LLC dba SVI Media LLC	Country
KMJB	89.1 FM	Hudson	Western Inspirational Broadcasters, Inc.	Contemporary Christian (Pilgrim Radio)
KMLD	94.5 FM	Casper	Mt. Rushmore Broadcasting, Inc.	Oldies
KMLT	88.3 FM	Jackson	Educational Media Foundation	Contemporary Christian (K-Love)
KMRZ-FM	106.7 FM	Superior	Big Thicket Broadcasting Company of Wyoming, Inc.	Top 40 (CHR)
KMTN	96.9 FM	Jackson	Jackson Hole Radio, LLC	Adult album alternative
KMWY	91.1 FM	Jackson	The Moody Bible Institute of Chicago	Christian
KMXW	92.5 FM	Bar Nunn	Breck Media Group Wyoming, Inc.	Silent
KNIV	104.7 FM	Lyman	Aerostar Communications, LLC	Regional Mexican
KNPJ	88.5 FM	Greybull	Hi-Line Radio Fellowship, Inc.	Christian
KNWT	89.1 FM	Cody	University of Wyoming	Adult album alternative (Wyoming Sounds)
KNYN	99.1 FM	Fort Bridger	M. Kent Frandsen	Country
KOCA-LP	93.5 FM	Laramie	La Radio Montanesa: Voz de la Gente	Spanish
KODI	1400 AM	Cody	Legend Communications of Wyoming, LLC	News Talk Information
KOFG	91.1 FM	Cody	Gospel Messengers	Religious
KOFR-LP	107.1 FM	Lander	Church of the Holy Rosary	Catholic
KOHR	88.9 FM	Sheridan	Hi-Line Radio Fellowship, Inc	Christian
KOLT-FM	100.7 FM	Cheyenne	iHM Licenses, LLC	Country
KOVE	1330 AM	Lander	Kairos Broadcasting, LLC	News/Talk
KOWB	1290 AM	Laramie	Townsquare License, LLC	News Talk Information
KOWY	102.3 FM	Dayton	Lovcom, Inc.	Adult contemporary
KPAW	92.9 FM	Warren AFB	iHM Licenses, LLC	Classic rock
KPIN	101.1 FM	Pinedale	Robert R. Rule	Country
KPMD	91.9 FM	Evanston	Western Inspirational Broadcasters, Inc.	Contemporary Christian (Pilgrim Radio)
KPOW	1260 AM	Powell	MGR Media, LLC	News/Talk & Country Music
KPRQ	88.1 FM	Sheridan	Montana State University – Billings	Public radio
KPUW	91.9 FM	Alpine	University of Wyoming	Public radio
KQLT	103.7 FM	Casper	Mt. Rushmore Broadcasting, Inc.	Country
KQOL	105.3 FM	Sleepy Hollow	Keyhole Broadcasting, LLC	Classic hits
KQSW	96.5 FM	Rock Springs	Big Thicket Broadcasting Company of Wyoming, Inc.	Country
KRAE	1480 AM	Cheyenne	Proshop Radio Broadcasting, LLC	Oldies
KRAL	1240 AM	Rawlins	Mt. Rushmore Broadcasting, Inc.	Silent
KRAN	103.3 FM	Warren AFB	Freisland Broadcasting Corp.	Classic country
KREO	93.5 FM	James Town	Pilot Butte Broadcasting LLC	Country
KRKK	1360 AM	Rock Springs	Big Thicket Broadcasting Company of Wyoming, Inc.	Oldies
KRKM	91.7 FM	Fort Washakie	Educational Media Foundation	Contemporary Christian (K-Love)
KRNK	96.7 FM	Casper	Townsquare License, LLC	Mainstream rock
KROE	930 AM	Sheridan	Lovcom, Inc.	News Talk Information
KROW	101.1 FM	Cody	White Park Broadcasting, Inc.	Contemporary Christian
KRQU	98.7 FM	Laramie	Appaloosa Broadcasting Company, Inc.	Classic rock
KRRR	104.9 FM	Cheyenne	Brahmin Broadcasting Corporation	Classic hits
KRSV	1210 AM	Afton	SVI Media, LLC	Country
KRSV-FM	98.7 FM	Afton	SVI Media, LLC	Adult contemporary
KRVK	107.9 FM	Vista West	Townsquare License, LLC	Adult hits
KSGT	1340 AM	Jackson	Jackson Hole Radio, LLC	Spanish CHR
KSIT	99.7 FM	Rock Springs	Big Thicket Broadcasting Company of Wyoming, Inc.	Adult hits
KSUW	91.3 FM	Sheridan	University of Wyoming	Public radio (NPR) HD
KTAG	97.9 FM	Cody	Legend Communications of Wyoming, LLC	Adult contemporary
KTAK	93.9 FM	Riverton	Edwards Communications LC	Country
KTDX	89.3 FM	Laramie	Educational Communications of Colorado Springs, Inc.	Contemporary Inspirational
KTED	100.5 FM	Evansville	Breck Media Group Wyoming, Inc.	Silent
KTGA	99.3 FM	Saratoga	Toga Radio LLC	Classic rock
KTME	89.5 FM	Vista West	Western Inspirational Broadcasters, Inc.	Contemporary Christian (Pilgrim Radio)
KTRS-FM	104.7 FM	Casper	Townsquare License, LLC	Top 40 (CHR)
KTUG	105.1 FM	Hudson	Morcom Broadcasting, LLC	Adult hits
KTWO	1030 AM	Casper	Townsquare License, LLC	News Talk Information
KTWY	97.1 FM	Shoshoni	University of Wyoming	Adult album alternative (Wyoming Sounds)
KUDA	89.9 FM	Bonneville	Cedar Cove Broadcasting, Inc.	
KUGR	1490 AM	Green River	Wagonwheel Communications Corporation	Soft adult contemporary/Talk
KUWA	91.3 FM	Afton	University of Wyoming	Public radio (NPR)
KUWC	91.3 FM	Casper	University of Wyoming	Public radio (NPR) HD
KUWD	91.5 FM	Sundance	University of Wyoming	Public radio (NPR) HD
KUWE	89.7 FM	Evanston	University of Wyoming	Public radio (NPR)
KUWG	90.9 FM	Gillette	University of Wyoming	Public radio (NPR) HD
KUWI	89.9 FM	Rawlins	University of Wyoming	Public radio (NPR)
KUWJ	90.3 FM	Jackson	University of Wyoming	Public radio (NPR) HD
KUWK	88.7 FM	Kaycee	University of Wyoming	Public radio (NPR)
KUWL	90.1 FM	Laramie	University of Wyoming	Jazz (Jazz Wyoming)
KUWN	90.5 FM	Newcastle	University of Wyoming	Public radio (NPR)
KUWP	90.1 FM	Powell	University of Wyoming	Public radio (NPR) HD
KUWR	91.9 FM	Laramie	University of Wyoming	Public radio (NPR) HD
KUWT	91.3 FM	Thermopolis	University of Wyoming	Public radio (NPR)
KUWV	90.7 FM	Lingle	University of Wyoming	Public radio (NPR)
KUWW	90.9 FM	Fort Washakie	University of Wyoming	Public radio (NPR) HD
KUWX	90.9 FM	Pinedale	University of Wyoming	Public radio (NPR)
KUWY	88.5 FM	Laramie	University of Wyoming	Classical (Classical Wyoming)
KUWZ	90.5 FM	Rock Springs	University of Wyoming	Public radio (NPR) HD
KUYO	830 AM	Evansville	Wyoming Christian Broadcasting Company	Christian
KVAM	88.1 FM	Cheyenne	Cedar Cove Broadcasting, Inc.	Variety
KVGL	105.7 FM	Manderson	Legend Communications of Wyoming, LLC	Classic hits
KVOC	1230 AM	Casper	Mt. Rushmore Broadcasting, Inc.	Talk
KVOW	1450 AM	Riverton	Edwards Communications LC	Talk/Personality
KWBB	104.5 FM	Upton	Breck Media Group Wyoming, Inc.	Adult hits
KWCF	89.3 FM	Sheridan	CSN International	Religious
KWCN	89.9 FM	Pinedale	WCN, Inc.	Variety
KWHO	107.1 FM	Lovell	White Park Broadcasting, Inc.	Classic rock
KWOR	1340 AM	Worland	Legend Communications of Wyoming, LLC	Talk
KWWM	91.3 FM	Rock Springs	Western Wyoming Community College	College radio
KWWY	106.3 FM	Shoshoni	University of Wyoming	Classical (Classical Wyoming)
KWYC	90.3 FM	Orchard Valley	CSN International	Christian
KWYG-LP	98.5 FM	Cheyenne	Faith Baptist Church	Southern Gospel
KWYO	1410 AM	Sheridan	Lovcom, Inc.	Classic country
KWYW	99.1 FM	Lost Cabin	Edwards Communications LC	Adult contemporary
KWYX	93.5 FM	Casper	Cochise Broadcasting LLC	Country
KWYY	95.5 FM	Midwest	Townsquare License, LLC	Country
KXBG	97.9 FM	Cheyenne	iHM Licenses, LLC	Country
KXDM-LP	95.3 FM	Worland	Divine Mercy Radio	Catholic
KXJN	97.7 FM	Moose Wilson Road	Cochise Media Licenses LLC	Unknown
KXUW	89.9 FM	Alta	University of Wyoming	Public radio
KXWY	103.1 FM	Hudson	University of Wyoming	Adult Album Alternative (Wyoming Sounds)
KXXL	106.1 FM	Moorcroft	Keyhole Broadcasting, LLC	Classic rock
KYCN	1340 AM	Wheatland	Smith Broadcasting, Incorporated	Country
KYCS	95.1 FM	Rock Springs	Wagonwheel Communications Corporation	Hot adult contemporary
KYDT	103.1 FM	Pine Haven	Tri State Communications, LLC	News Talk Information
KYOY	92.3 FM	Hillsdale	Proshop Radio Broadcasting, LLC	Classic hits
KYTI	93.7 FM	Sheridan	Lovcom, Inc.	Country
KYWY	95.5 FM	Pine Bluffs	E Media USA LLC	Religious
KZEW	101.7 FM	Wheatland	Smith Broadcasting, Incorporated	Adult contemporary
KZJH	95.3 FM	Jackson	Jackson Hole Radio, LLC	Classic rock
KZMQ	1140 AM	Greybull	Legend Communications of Wyoming, LLC	Oldies
KZMQ-FM	100.3 FM	Greybull	Legend Communications of Wyoming, LLC	Country
KZQL	105.5 FM	Mills	Breck Media Group Wyoming, Inc.	Silent
KZUW	88.5 FM	Reliance	University of Wyoming	Classical (Classical Wyoming)
KZWB	97.9 FM	Green River	Wagonwheel Communications Corporation	Classic hits
KZWY	94.9 FM	Sheridan	Lovcom, Inc.	Classic rock
KZZS	98.3 FM	Story	Legend Communications of Wyoming, LLC	Soft adult contemporary

== Defunct ==
- KATI
- KBTG-LP
- KEVA
- KFBU/KWYO
- KHAN (FM)
- KIML
- KING-LP
- KJUA
- KKAW
- KLWR-LP
- KMGQ
- KNIE
- KQCO
- KRBR (FM)
- KRKU
- KRTR
- KTDM
- KTHE
- KTYN
- KUDA
- KWRR
- KYDZ
