= KKWY =

KKWY may refer to:

- KKWY (FM), a radio station (88.1 FM) licensed to serve Wheatland, Wyoming, United States
- KDJY, a radio station (88.7 FM) licensed to serve Douglas, Wyoming, United States, which held the call sign KKWY from 2011 to 2013
- KFBU, a radio station (1630 AM) licensed to serve Fox Farm, Wyoming, United States, which held the call sign KKWY from 1997 to 2005
- KKWY (Colorado), a defunct radio station (88.7 FM) formerly licensed to serve Estes Park, Colorado, United States
