= KKTY =

KKTY may refer to:

- KKTY (AM), a radio station (1470 AM) licensed to Douglas, Wyoming, United States
- KKTY-FM, a radio station (100.1 FM) licensed to Glendo, Wyoming, United States
- KKTS-FM, a radio station (99.3 FM) licensed to Douglas, Wyoming, which held the call sign KKTY-FM in 1992 and from 1993 to 2011
- KKTY-FM was the call sign used by the student-run radio station in the TV sitcom Saved by the Bell.
