= KEZF =

KEZF may refer to:

- KEZF (FM), a radio station (88.7 FM) licensed to serve Grants, New Mexico, United States
- KVAM (FM), a radio station (88.1 FM) licensed to serve Cheyenne, Wyoming, United States, which held the call sign KEZF from February to June 2020
- KAIX, a radio station (88.3 FM) licensed to serve Casper, Wyoming, United States, which held the call sign KEZF from 2019 to 2020
- KJJC (AM), a radio station (1230 AM) licensed to serve Murray, Utah, United States, which held the call sign KEZF from 2018 to 2019
- KYWY (FM), a radio station (95.5 FM) licensed to serve Pine Bluffs, Wyoming, which held the call sign KEZF from 2014 to 2018
- KVXO, a radio station (88.3 FM) licensed to serve Fort Collins, Colorado, United States, which held the call sign KEZF in 2014
- the ICAO code for Shannon Airport near Fredericksburg, Virginia
