= KKRR =

KKRR may refer to:

- KKRR-LP, a defunct low-power television station (channel 45) formerly licensed to serve Cheyenne, Wyoming, United States
- KAIX, a radio station (88.3 FM) licensed to serve Casper, Wyoming, which held the call sign KKRR from 2008 to 2019
- KIMX, a radio station (96.7 FM) licensed to serve Laramie, Wyoming, which held the call sign KKRR from 1999 to 2001
- KHOC, a radio station (102.5 FM) licensed to serve Casper, Wyoming, which held the call sign KKRR from 1997 to 1998
