= KFMH =

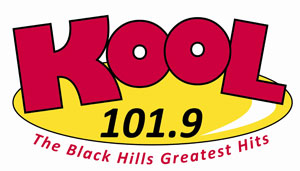
- Belle Fourche, South Dakota; United States
- Broadcast area: Rapid City, South Dakota
- Frequency: 101.9 MHz
- Branding: Kool 101.9

Programming
- Format: Classic hits
- Affiliations: ABC News Radio

Ownership
- Owner: Mid-Century Radio
- Sister stations: KRKI; KXZT

History
- First air date: September 10, 2003 (at 102.1)
- Former frequencies: 102.1 MHz (2003–2006)

Technical information
- Licensing authority: FCC
- Facility ID: 40636
- Class: C
- ERP: 100,000 watts
- HAAT: 454 meters (1490 feet)
- Repeater: 101.9 KFMH-FM1 (Rapid City)

Links
- Public license information: Public file; LMS
- Webcast: Listen Live
- Website: kool1019fm.com

KFMH (101.9 FM, "Kool 101.9") is a radio station licensed to serve Belle Fourche, South Dakota. The station serves Rapid City, South Dakota, with an on-channel broadcast booster licensed as KFMH-FM1. The station is owned by Mid-Century Radio. KFMH broadcasts a classic hits music format.

== History ==
This station received its original construction permit for a new FM station broadcasting with 25,000 watts of effective radiated power at 102.1 MHz from the Federal Communications Commission on March 28, 2000—nearly six years after the application had been first filed. The new station was assigned the call letters KFMH by the FCC on May 7, 2002. KFMH received its license to cover from the FCC on September 10, 2003.

In April 2004, MAS Communications, Inc. (Mark A. Swendsen, president) agreed to sell this station to Laramie Mountain Broadcasting, LLC (Victor A. Michael, president) for a reported sale price of $250,000. The deal was approved by the FCC on June 4, 2004, and the transaction was consummated on June 25, 2004.

B102 logo

The station previously operated under the branding "B102" with a similar oldies music format.

In July 2004, the station received a new construction permit to change broadcast frequencies from 102.1 MHz to the current 101.9 MHz.

In June 2005, Laramie Mountain Broadcasting, LLC, had reached an agreement to sell this station to Bad Lands Broadcasting Company, Inc., for a reported sale price of $915,000. The deal was approved by the FCC on September 6, 2005.

However, the sale of KFMH was contingent upon Bad Lands Broadcasting Company acquiring KRKI from Michaels Radio Group and ongoing technical issues have forced Laramie Mountain Broadcasting to file for a series of 90-day "extension of consummation" approvals with the FCC. The latest such filing was made on December 21, 2009, and as such the sale was still pending at that point. As part of this filing, Laramie Mountain Broadcasting and Bad Lands Broadcasting Company state that they have "resolved the interference issues that were delaying closing" and that both companies are "currently finalizing resolution of other outstanding issues".

The sale to Bad Lands Broadcasting was eventually consummated on May 17, 2013; the transaction involved Laramie Mountain Broadcasting acquiring KKAW and KREO from Bad Lands Broadcasting, in exchange for Bad Lands receiving KFMH and $100,000 from Laramie.

== Booster ==
Call sign	Frequency	City of license	FID	ERP (W)	Class	FCC info
KFMH-FM1	101.9 FM	Rapid City, South Dakota	164913	1,000	D	LMS

== Previous logo ==
(KFMH's logo under previous "Oldies 101.9" branding)
