= KKTS =

KKTS may refer to:

- KKTS (AM), a radio station (1580 AM) licensed to serve Evansville, Wyoming, United States
- KKTS-FM, a radio station (99.3 FM) licensed to serve Douglas, Wyoming
