= KRND =

KRND may refer to:

- Randolph Air Force Base (ICAO code KRND)
- KFBU, a radio station (1630 AM) licensed to serve Fox Farm, Wyoming, United States, which held the call sign KRND from 2005 to 2021
