= KLMT =

KLMT may refer to:

- The ICAO code for Klamath Falls Airport
- KLMT (FM), a radio station (89.3 FM) licensed to Billings, Montana, United States
