= KYOD =

KYOD may refer to:

- KYOD-LP, a low-power radio station (93.7 FM) licensed to serve Odessa, Texas, United States
- KKTY-FM, a radio station (100.1 FM) licensed to serve Glendo, Wyoming, United States, which held the call sign KYOD from 1999 to 2011
