= KLWR =

KLWR may refer to:

- KLWR (FM), a radio station (101.9 FM) licensed to serve North Rock Springs, Wyoming, United States
- KLWR-LP, a defunct low-power radio station (105.3 FM) formerly licensed to serve Powell, Wyoming
