= KDCO =

KDCO may refer to:

- KDCO (AM), a radio station (1340 AM) licensed to serve Denver, Colorado, United States
- KKWY (Colorado), a radio station (88.7 FM) licensed to serve Estes Park, Colorado, which held the call sign KDCO in 2015
- KKCL (AM), a radio station (1550 AM) licensed to serve Golden, Colorado, which held the call sign KDCO from 2012 to 2015
