= KPUW =

KPUW may refer to:

- KPUW (FM), a radio station (91.9 FM) licensed to serve Alpine, Wyoming, United States; see List of radio stations in Wyoming
- Pullman–Moscow Regional Airport
