= KQOL =

KQOL may refer to:

- KQOL (FM), a radio station (105.3 FM) licensed to Sleepy Hollow, Wyoming, United States
- KFBW, a radio station (105.9 FM) licensed to Vancouver, Washington, United States, which held the call sign KQOL from September 2007 to June 2009
- KVGK, a radio station (93.1 FM) licensed to Las Vegas, Nevada, United States, which held the call sign KQOL-FM from September 1998 to October 2006
