= KFCY =

KFCY may refer to:

- Forrest City Municipal Airport (ICAO code KFCY)
- KVAM (FM), a radio station (88.1 FM) licensed to serve Cheyenne, Wyoming, United States, which held the call sign KFCY from 2020 to 2022
- KEZF (FM), a radio station (88.7 FM) licensed to serve Grants, New Mexico, United States, which held the call sign KFCY from 2018 to 2020
- KKHG, a defunct radio station (92.3 FM) formerly licensed to serve Hugo, Colorado, United States, which held the call sign KFCY from 2012 to 2013
