= KXZS =

Radio station in Wall, South Dakota (2011–2015)

- Wall, South Dakota; United States
- Broadcast area: Rapid City, South Dakota
- Frequency: 107.5 MHz

Programming
- Format: Defunct

Ownership
- Owner: JER Licenses
- Sister stations: KXZT

Technical information
- Licensing authority: FCC
- Facility ID: 170965
- Class: C3
- ERP: 8,400 watts
- HAAT: 75 meters
- Transmitter coordinates: 43°56′9″N 102°8′29″W

Links
- Public license information: Public file; LMS

KXZS was an American radio station licensed by the Federal Communications Commission (FCC) to broadcast at 107.5 MHz from Wall, South Dakota, covering the Rapid City and Black Hills area from the east. Owned by JER Licenses, it was to become a simulcast with KXZT, which would broadcast on 107.9 from Newell, South Dakota when that station signed on.

The station's license was cancelled by the FCC on August 24, 2016, due to KXZS having been silent for more than twelve months (since March 17, 2015).
