= KAML =

KAML may refer to:

- KAML (AM), a radio station (990 AM) licensed to Kenedy-Karnes City, Texas, United States
- KAML-FM, a radio station (97.3 FM) licensed to Gillette, Wyoming, United States
