= KRFD =

KRFD may refer to:

- Chicago Rockford International Airport (ICAO code KRFD)
- KRFD (FM), a radio station (100.1 FM) licensed to serve Fleming, Colorado, United States
- KCGC (FM), a radio station (94.5 FM) licensed to serve Merino, Colorado, which held the call sign KRFD from 2009 to 2015
- KJXN, a radio station (105.1 FM) licensed to serve South Park, Wyoming, United States, which held the call sign KRFD from April 2008 to April 2009
