= KRKI =

- Keystone, South Dakota; United States
- Broadcast area: Rapid City, South Dakota
- Frequency: 99.5 MHz
- Branding: 99.5 The Mine

Programming
- Format: Classic country
- Affiliations: ABC News Radio

Ownership
- Owner: Mid-Century Radio
- Sister stations: KFMH; KXZT

History
- First air date: 2000
- Former call signs: KVAM (2000)

Technical information
- Licensing authority: FCC
- Facility ID: 89114
- Class: C1
- ERP: 100,000 watts
- HAAT: 224 meters (735 ft)
- Repeaters: 99.5 KRKI-FM1 (Rapid City); 107.9 KXZT (Newell)

Links
- Public license information: Public file; LMS
- Website: www.995themine.com

KRKI (99.5 FM, "99.5 The Mine") is a radio station licensed to serve Keystone, South Dakota. The station serves Rapid City, South Dakota, with an on-channel broadcast booster licensed as KRKI-FM1. The station is owned by Mid-Century Radio. KRKI airs a classic country format.

== History ==
The station signed on in 2000 as KVAM (changing its call letters to KRKI later that year) with a rhythmic format as Hip Hop Radio serving Newcastle, Wyoming. In 2007, the station upgraded to 100,000 watts and moved to Rapid City, South Dakota, with a format flip to the Real Country satellite network as US 99.5. On January 5, 2009, KRKI switched to a 24-hour simulcast of ESPN Radio becoming the first full-time sports talk station in the Rapid City market.

On April 1, 2012, KRKI changed affiliations from ESPN Radio to Fox Sports Radio, while KTOQ switched to ESPN Radio the same day.

On October 8, 2012, it branded itself "99-5 The Range" and adopted the Classic Country format.

On November 29, 2012, KRKI's city of license was changed from Newcastle, Wyoming to Keystone, South Dakota.

As of February 17, 2017 KRKI updated its music format and rebranded as "True Country 99.5" adopting a Country format featuring top-10 Country hits from 1988 to 2012.

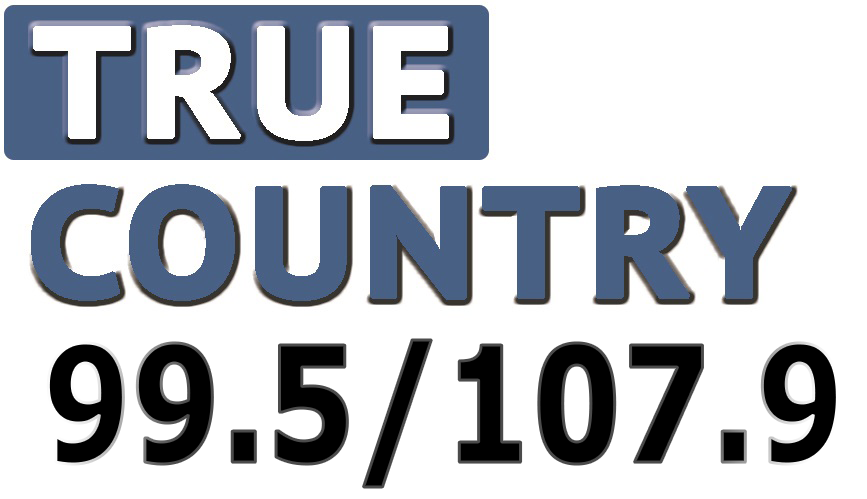
Previous logo

On April 14, 2017, KRKI added KXZT 107.9 as a simulcast. KXZT's transmitter is located on top of Terry Peak to allow True Country 99.5/107.9 to broadcast the same signal north of Belle Fourche to down south of Chadron, Nebraska as well as all of northeastern Wyoming making it the largest FM signal in the Rapid City/Black Hills area.

On December 19, 2024, KRKI and KXZT shifted to classic country, branded as "99.5 The Mine".
