= KANT (FM) =

- Guernsey, Wyoming; United States
- Frequency: 104.1 MHz
- Branding: 104.1 The Drive

Programming
- Format: Adult hits

Ownership
- Owner: Kent Smith and Grant Kath; (Peak Radio LLC)
- Sister stations: KRRR

History
- First air date: April 21, 2005

Technical information
- Licensing authority: FCC
- Facility ID: 164287
- Class: C2
- ERP: 36,000 watts
- HAAT: 171.9 meters (564 ft)
- Transmitter coordinates: 42°20′46.6″N 105°2′3.9″W

Links
- Public license information: Public file; LMS

KANT (104.1 FM) is a radio station licensed to Guernsey, Wyoming, United States. The station, established in 2008, is currently owned by Kent Smith and Grant Kath through Peak Radio LLC. KANT broadcasts an adult hits format.

== History ==
This station received its original construction permit from the Federal Communications Commission on April 21, 2005. The new station was assigned the KANT call sign by the FCC on May 1, 2005. KANT received its license to cover from the FCC on March 28, 2008.

In January 2009, White Park Broadcasting, Inc., reached an agreement to sell this station to the Brahmin Broadcasting Corporation. The deal was approved by the FCC on February 18, 2009, and the transaction was consummated on February 24, 2009.

Effective August 17, 2012, KANT was sold to Karl Lieber's Chisholm Trail Broadcasting LLC in exchange for Chisholm's KKAW. On August 20, 2012, KANT shifted its format from classic hits to adult hits.

Effective March 28, 2013 KANT was sold to Peak Radio LLC at a purchase price of $80,000.
