= KIML-FM =

KIML
- Antelope Valley-Crestview, Wyoming; United States
- Broadcast area: Gillette
- Frequency: 93.3 MHz (HD Radio)
- Branding: News Talk 93.3

Programming
- Format: Talk radio
- Affiliations: Fox News Radio; NBC News Radio; Fox Sports Radio; Premiere Networks; Radio America; Westwood One

Ownership
- Owner: Legend Communications of Wyoming, LLC
- Sister stations: KDDV, KGWY, KAML-FM, KIML

History
- First air date: March 28, 2012
- Former call signs: KWDU (2007–2012)

Technical information
- Licensing authority: FCC
- Facility ID: 166061
- Class: C3
- ERP: 13,500 watts
- HAAT: 136.2 meters (447 ft)
- Transmitter coordinates: 44°14′35″N 105°32′19″W
- Translator: HD2: 106.7 K294BD (Gillette)

Links
- Public license information: Public file; LMS
- Website: basinsradio.com

KIML (93.3 FM) is a radio station licensed to Gillette, Wyoming, United States, airing a talk format. The station runs 24 hours a day, 7 days a week.

== History ==
The station started with the call letters KWDU as a construction permit and was first authorized to broadcast on March 28, 2012.

It was initially a Classic Country station, briefly using the call sign KLED and branded as "The Legend." The Classic Country format was later moved to a translator station on 106.7 FM The news/talk format came from former sister KIML. That station signed off the air on April 12, 2024, and its owner subsequently had the FCC cancel the license on April 26, 2024, permanently deleting the AM facility.

The station was planned by owner Legend Communications of Wyoming, LLC, as part of its Basin Radio Network, and serves the Gillette area. They started the station under a construction permit to serve Antelope Valley-Crestview, Wyoming, United States.

In 2024, the ownership of Legend Communications underwent a major restructuring. Co-owner Susan K. Patrick was sentenced to prison for tax fraud, which included evading taxes on millions of dollars in income. She was ordered to pay restitution exceeding $3.8 million. Following this, her ex-husband and co-founder, W. Lawrence Patrick, filed an application with the FCC to become the sole owner of Legend Communications, taking over Susan Patrick's 50% stake.

The station is broadcasting in HD. It carries a classic country (KIML-FM's format as KLED) subchannel on KIML-FM HD2. This station is also heard on translator K294BD 106.7 FM.

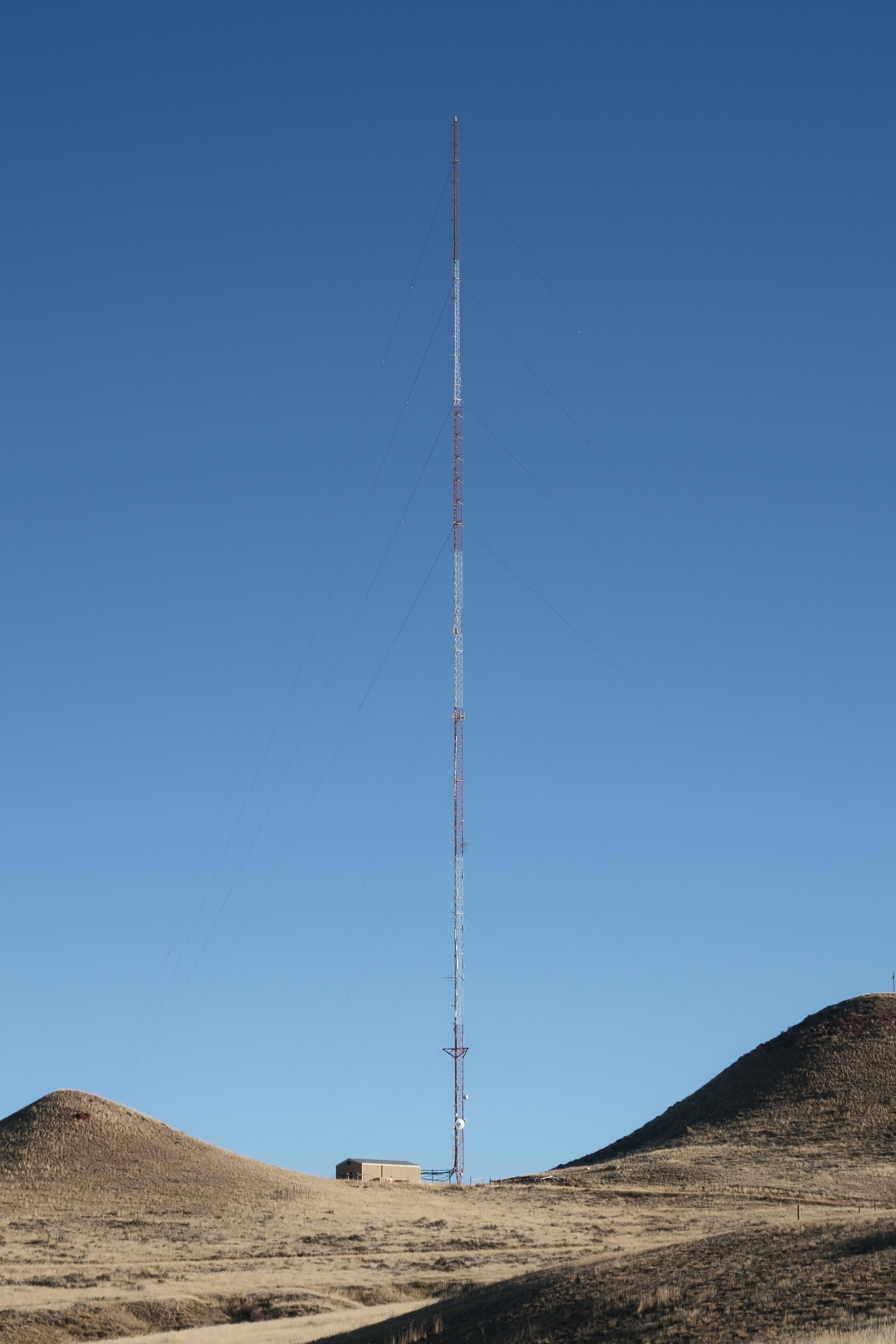
Transmitter used by KLED located at 44°14′35″N 105°32′19″W in Gillette, Wyoming

Logo as "93.3 The Legend"
