= KRQU =

- Laramie, Wyoming; United States
- Frequency: 98.7 MHz
- Branding: 98.7 Vintage Vinyl

Programming
- Format: Classic rock

Ownership
- Owner: Wolf Creek Radio Broadcasting, Inc
- Sister stations: KHAT; KIMX; KLMI

History
- First air date: 2006
- Former call signs: KHIH (2005); KUSZ (2005–2008); KRQU (2008–2011); KAAZ (2011–2012)

Technical information
- Licensing authority: FCC
- Facility ID: 82198
- Class: A
- ERP: 110 watts
- HAAT: 327 meters (1,073 ft)
- Transmitter coordinates: 41°18′39″N 105°27′12″W

Links
- Public license information: Public file; LMS
- Webcast: Listen live
- Website: www.987krqu.com

KRQU (98.7 MHz, 98.7 Vintage Vinyl) is a radio station licensed to Laramie, Wyoming, owned by Wolf Creek Radio Broadcasting, Inc. The station serves the Laramie area.

== History ==
Prior to switching frequencies, KRQU was located at 104.5 FM. The station was assigned the call sign KHIH on May 2, 2005. On December 29, 2005, the station changed its call sign to KUSZ, and on March 5, 2008, to KRQU. On April 6, 2011, changed its call sign to KAAZ. On November 26, 2012, changed its call sign to the current KRQU.
