= KHAT =

- Laramie, Wyoming; United States
- Broadcast area: Laramie, Wyoming
- Frequency: 1210 kHz
- Branding: True Country 96.7

Programming
- Format: Country music

Ownership
- Owner: Wolf Creek Radio Broadcasting, Inc
- Sister stations: KLMI, KIMX, KRQU

History
- First air date: 1927 (as KBBZ at 1490)
- Former call signs: KBBZ (1927–1962); KLME (1962–1971); KOJO (1971–1985); KLDI (1985–2002); KRRR (2002–2002); KKHI (2002–2003)
- Former frequencies: 1490 kHz (1927-1985)
- Call sign meaning: Cowboy hat

Technical information
- Licensing authority: FCC
- Facility ID: 10333
- Class: B
- Power: 10,000 watts (day); 1,000 watts (night)
- Transmitter coordinates: 41°15′19″N 105°33′1″W
- Translator: 96.7 K244FN (Laramie)

Links
- Public license information: Public file; LMS
- Webcast: Listen live
- Website: laramieradio.com

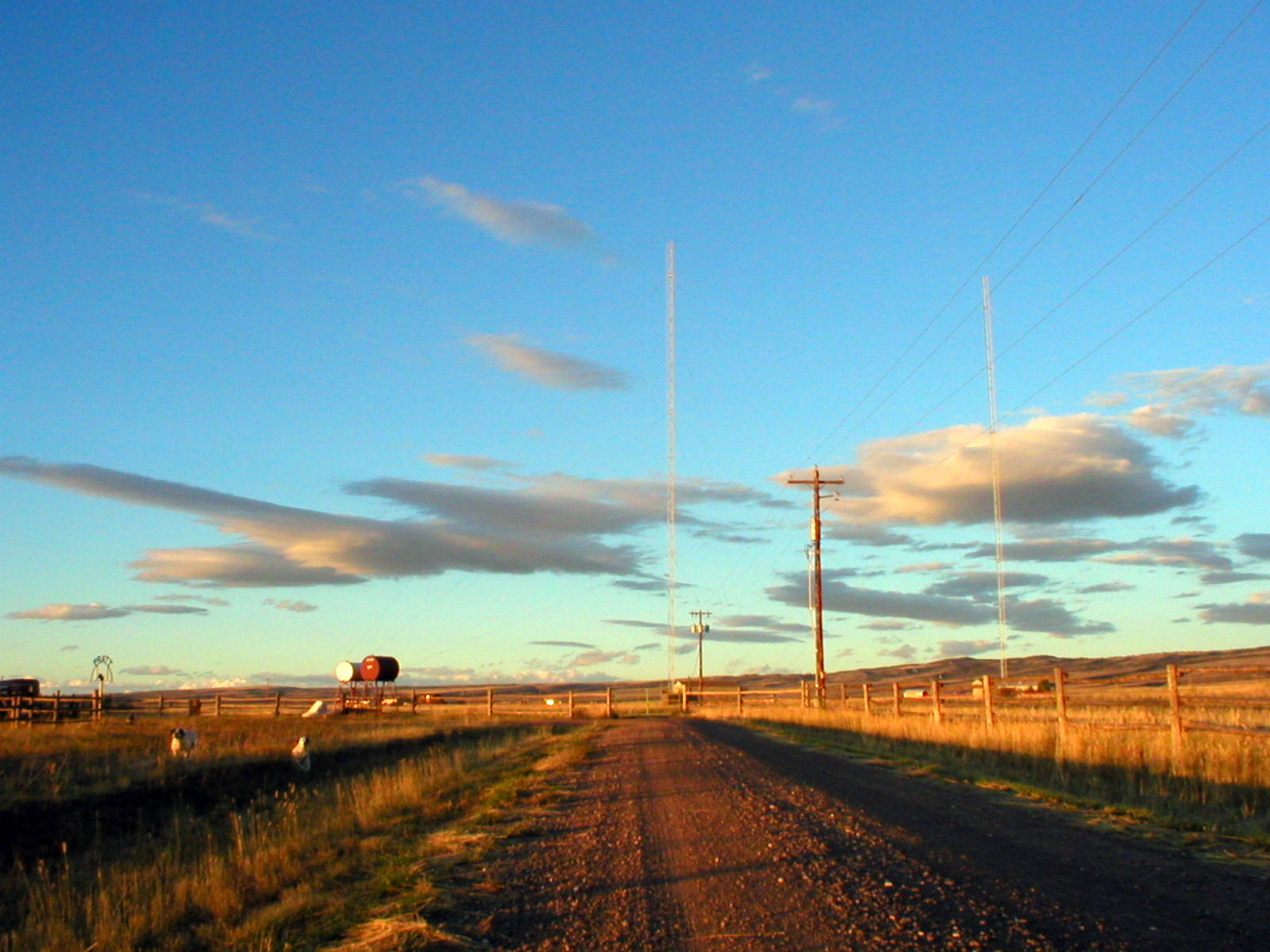
The radio towers for KHAT, located south of Laramie, Wyoming.

KHAT (1210 AM) is a radio station broadcasting a country music format. Licensed to Laramie, Wyoming, United States, the station is currently owned by Wolf Creek Radio Broadcasting inc. The station is branded as "True Country 96.7" due to it having an additional FM translator, K244FN, which also serves Laramie.

== History ==
The station operated as KOJO on 1490 from 1971 until 1985. During this time, the station was located in downtown Laramie in 1971 and moved to a new building in 1972. On July 10, 1975, at 6:30 in the morning, an explosion occurred at the new KOJO studios in Laramie. The explosion was caused by natural gas escaping from a four-inch line under the parking lot and seeping up through the slab floor. A DJ and a newsman were inside the building at the time, confirming it as an on-air studio incident. The news reporter, Alan Harris, went on to create The Radio Network group of stations in southwestern Wyoming.. The station later moved from the 1490 kHz frequency to the current 1210 kHz to increase its transmitting power.

The station was assigned the call letters KLDI on November 1, 1985. On March 25, 2002, the station changed its call sign to KRRR. On April 1, 2002, the station became KKHI. Finally, on December 1, 2003, it became the current call letters KHAT. Prior to obtaining its current format (and call letters), the station carried an oldies format, followed by sports radio from ESPN Radio, before switching to country in early 2012 upon the translator launch.

On May 1, 2026, KHAT rebranded as "True Country 96.7".
