= KFGR =

- Powell, Wyoming; United States
- Broadcast area: Cody, Wyoming; Park County, Wyoming; Big Horn County, Wyoming
- Frequency: 88.1 MHz
- Branding: Free Grace Radio

Programming
- Format: Christian radio

Ownership
- Owner: Trinity Bible Church

History
- Call sign meaning: Free Grace Radio

Technical information
- Licensing authority: FCC
- Facility ID: 174192
- Class: C3
- ERP: 600 watts
- HAAT: 481 meters (1,578 ft)
- Transmitter coordinates: 44°35′7″N 108°51′1″W

Links
- Public license information: Public file; LMS
- Webcast: Listen live
- Website: tbcwyoming.com/kfgr-radio

KFGR (88.1 FM) is a Christian radio station licensed to Powell, Wyoming, United States. The station serves eastern Park County, Wyoming and western Big Horn County, Wyoming, and is owned by Trinity Bible Church.

KFGR first came on the air in 2003, and originally broadcast on 105.3 in Powell, Wyoming as a low power station. KFGR moved to 88.1 in December 2009, with 105.3 becoming KLWR-LP.
