= KMTN =

- Jackson, Wyoming; United States
- Frequency: 96.9 MHz
- Branding: 96.9 The Mountain

Programming
- Format: Adult album alternative
- Affiliations: ABC News Radio

Ownership
- Owner: Scott Anderson; (Jackson Hole Radio, LLC)
- Sister stations: KJAX, KSGT, KZJH

History
- Call sign meaning: Mountain

Technical information
- Licensing authority: FCC
- Facility ID: 10339
- Class: C1
- ERP: 48,000 watts
- HAAT: 323.0 meters (1,059.7 ft)
- Transmitter coordinates: 43°27′42″N 110°45′10″W

Links
- Public license information: Public file; LMS
- Website: kmtn.live

KMTN (96.9 FM, " 96.9 The Mountain") is a radio station broadcasting an adult album alternative format. Licensed to Jackson, Wyoming, United States, the station is owned by Scott Anderson, through licensee Jackson Hole Radio, LLC. Anderson has managed the station for over 25 years. He also served as a Jackson, Wyoming Town councilman for 12 years.

== History ==
KMTN was founded by "Captain" Bob Morris in 1974 and officially licensed on January 28, 1975. In 2012, the studios for the station were located at the corner of Wyoming Highway 22, and U.S. Route 89. Chaparral Broadcasting sold KMTN and seven other stations to Rich Broadcasting for $3.7 million; the transaction was consummated on April 1, 2013. Under Rich Broadcasting, KMTN and its sister FM stations were threatened to be shut off for a period of time due to a tower dispute with American Tower. The station was renting space on a tower, and was behind $500,000. Rich Broadcasting's issues with American Tower began to involve United States Senators Orrin Hatch of Utah, and John Barrasso of Wyoming.

A U.S. bankruptcy court judge in Utah ruled that American Tower could not turn off the radio stations unless a deal was reached.

Rich Broadcasting sold KMTN, three other stations, and four translators to Scott Anderson's Jackson Hold Radio, LLC effective March 16, 2020.
