= Antelope Valley-Crestview, Wyoming =

- Census-designated place
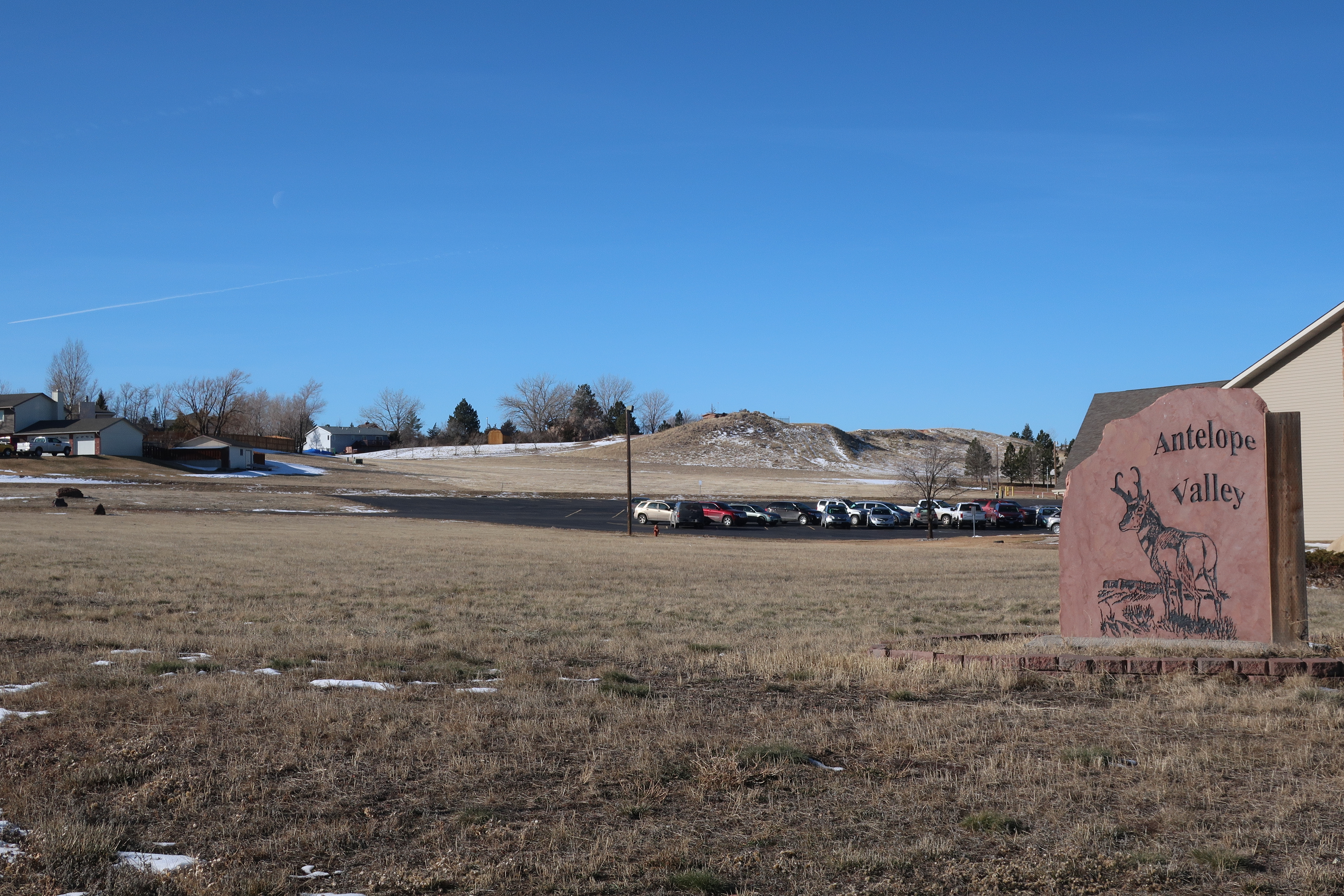
- Antelope Valley welcome sign

- Location in Campbell County, Wyoming and the state of Wyoming
- Coordinates: 44°13′49″N 105°28′27″W
- Country: United States
- State: Wyoming
- County: Campbell

Area
  - Total: 4.9 sq mi (12.7 km^{2})
  - Land: 4.9 sq mi (12.7 km^{2})
  - Water: 0 sq mi (0.0 km^{2})
- Elevation: 4,715 ft (1,437 m)

Population (2010)
  - Total: 1,658
  - Density: 338/sq mi (131/km^{2})
- Time zone: UTC-7 (Mountain (MST))
  - Summer (DST): UTC-6 (MDT)
- Area code: 307
- FIPS code: 56-02900
- GNIS feature ID: 2407747

Antelope Valley-Crestview was a census-designated place (CDP) in Campbell County, Wyoming, United States. The population was 1,658 at the 2010 census. Antelope Valley-Crestview was annexed by the nearby city of Gillette at the beginning of 2018.

== History ==
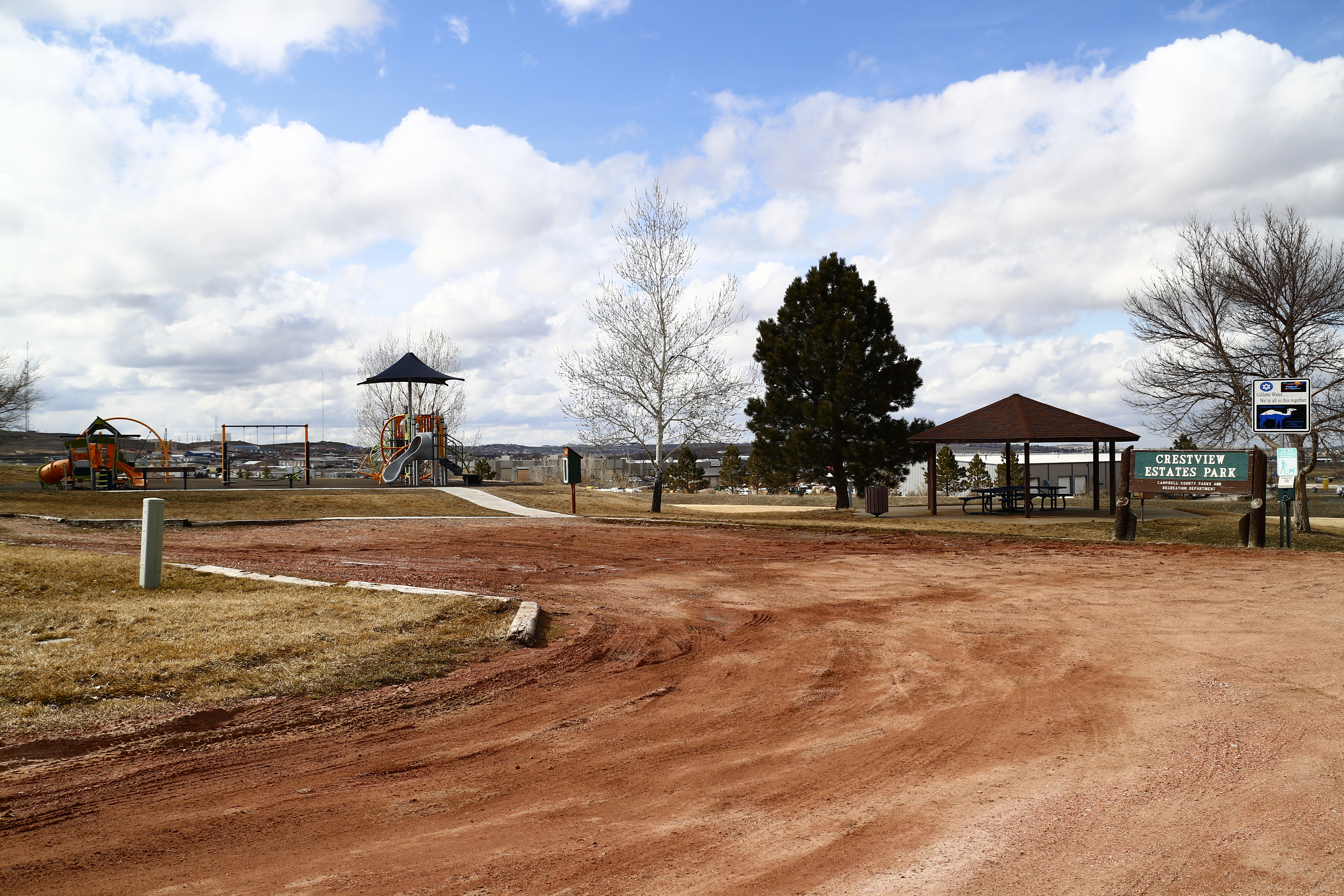
Crestview Estates Park in the Crestview Estates part of Antelope Valley-Crestview

Antelope Valley-Crestview was annexed by the city of Gillette on January 1, 2018.

== Geography ==
According to the United States Census Bureau, the CDP had a total area of 4.9 square miles (12.7 km^{2}), all land.

== Demographics ==
As of the census of 2000, there were 1,642 people, 545 households, and 459 families residing in the CDP. The population density was 333.8 people per square mile (128.9/km^{2}). There were 567 housing units at an average density of 115.2/sq mi (44.5/km^{2}). The racial makeup of the CDP was 96.65% White, 0.06% African American, 1.10% Native American, 0.18% Asian, 0.24% from other races, and 1.77% from two or more races. Hispanic or Latino of any race were 2.98% of the population.

There were 545 households, out of which 50.8% had children under the age of 18 living with them, 75.0% were married couples living together, 5.7% had a female householder with no husband present, and 15.6% were non-families. 11.2% of all households were made up of individuals, and 0.9% had someone living alone who was 65 years of age or older. The average household size was 3.01 and the average family size was 3.27.

In the CDP, the population was spread out, with 33.4% under the age of 18, 8.0% from 18 to 24, 34.2% from 25 to 44, 22.9% from 45 to 64, and 1.5% who were 65 years of age or older. The median age was 32 years. For every 100 females, there were 112.1 males. For every 100 females age 18 and over, there were 109.2 males.

The median income for a household in the CDP was $70,833, and the median income for a family was $72,031. Males had a median income of $49,063 versus $26,905 for females. The per capita income for the CDP was $24,628. About 1.5% of families and 1.6% of the population were below the poverty line, including 1.9% of those under age 18 and none of those age 65 or over.

== Education ==
Public education in the community of Antelope Valley-Crestview was provided by Campbell County School District #1.
