= KGCC =

- Gillette, Wyoming; United States
- Frequency: 99.9 MHz

Programming
- Format: Classic rock

Ownership
- Owner: Keyhole Broadcasting, LLC
- Sister stations: KXXL, KQOL

History
- Former call signs: KXXL (2002–2008)

Technical information
- Licensing authority: FCC
- Facility ID: 88381
- Class: C1
- ERP: 51,000 watts
- HAAT: 114 meters (374 ft)
- Transmitter coordinates: 44°17′33″N 105°26′10″W

Links
- Public license information: Public file; LMS

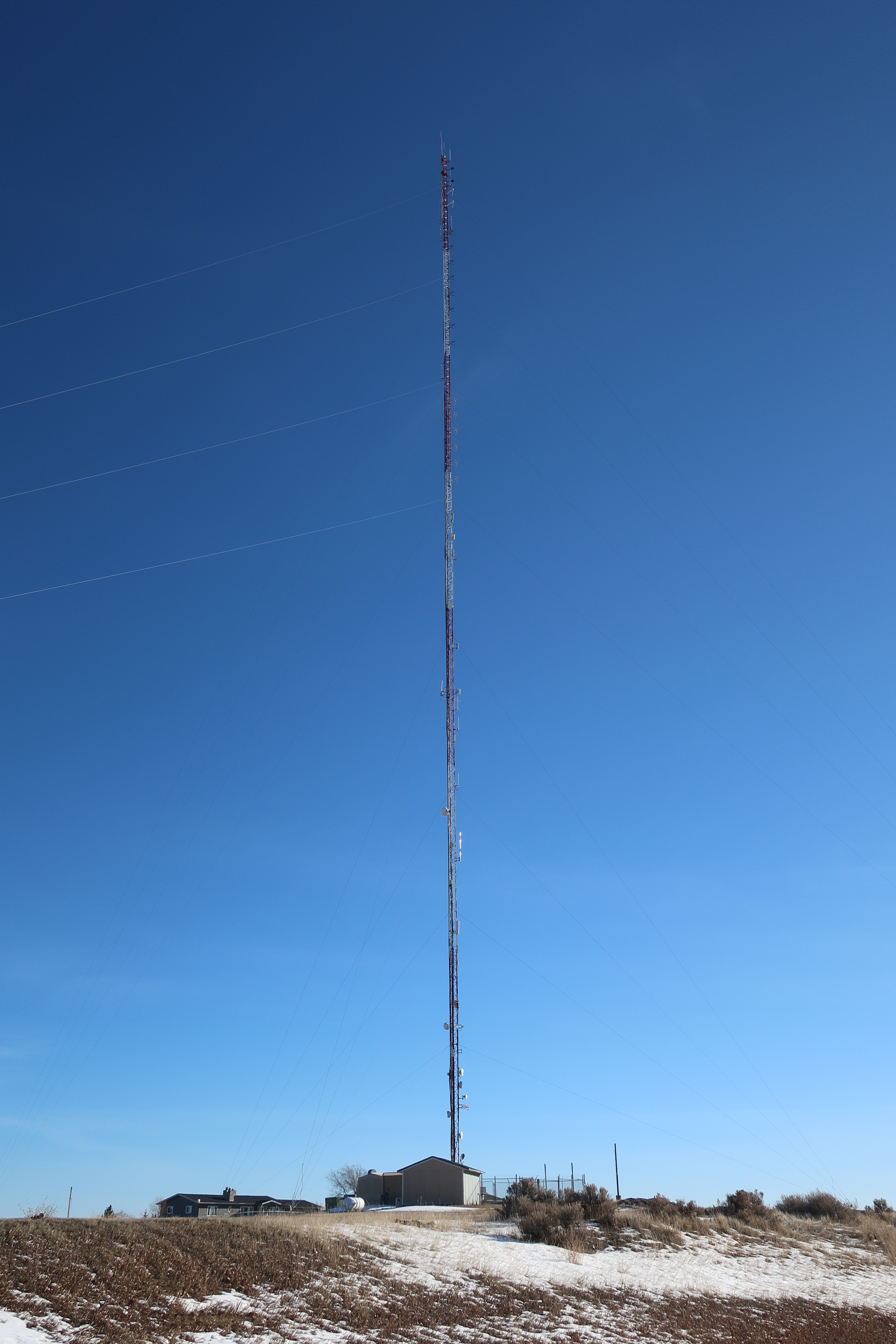
The station's transmitter, shared with sister station KQOL.

KGCC (99.9 FM) is a radio station licensed to Gillette, Wyoming, United States. The station is currently owned by Keyhole Broadcasting, LLC. The station's transmitter is sited on the east side of Gillette near Interstate 90.

Keyhole operates sister stations KXXL, and KQOL in the Gillette area as well.

The station began operating with the call sign KXXL on October 25, 2002. The station changed its call sign to its current KGCC on June 11, 2008. It is owned and operated by Keyhole Broadcasting, LLC, and serves the Gillette area from its main studio.
