= KXJN =

- Moose Wilson Road, Wyoming; United States
- Broadcast area: Jackson, Wyoming
- Frequency: 97.7 MHz

Ownership
- Owner: Cochise Media Licenses LLC
- Sister stations: KJXN

History
- Former call signs: KLEP (2008–2010)
- Former frequencies: 98.5 MHz (2009–2016)

Technical information
- Licensing authority: FCC
- Facility ID: 166043
- Class: A
- ERP: 470 watts
- HAAT: 345 meters (1,132 ft)
- Transmitter coordinates: 43°27′42″N 110°45′12″W

Links
- Public license information: Public file; LMS

KXJN (97.7 FM) is a radio station licensed to Moose Wilson Road, Wyoming, United States. The station is currently owned by Cochise Media Licenses LLC.

The station has a history of technical maneuvering. It originally signed on in 2008 under the call sign KLEP, but transitioned to the KXJN call letters on April 2, 2010.

Originally broadcasting on 98.5 MHz, the station applied for a frequency shift to 97.7 MHz in 2016. This move was part of a strategic realignment by Cochise Broadcasting to better position its signals within the mountainous Teton County terrain.

KXJN was a primary subject in the same series of FCC enforcement actions that affected its sister station, KJXN.

The station's parent company was issued a $7,000 fine by the FCC for failing to maintain a "meaningful management and staff presence" at its local studio. The FCC's investigation found that the station was essentially operating without the required local personnel, a violation of the rules intended to ensure stations serve their community of license.

KXJN was included in the landmark 2017 Consent Decree between Cochise Media Licenses and the FCC. The decree addressed "long-term, chronic failures to operate" across Cochise's portfolio. The FCC found that the station frequently went silent for long periods, only resuming broadcast for brief intervals to prevent the automatic cancellation of its license under Section 312(g).

As a result of this decree, KXJN was designated a "Retained Station," but was placed under a strict Compliance Plan. For a period following the order, the station was legally prohibited from being silent for more than 120 cumulative hours in a single year to ensure it provided consistent service to Jackson Hole.
