= KWYX =

- Casper, Wyoming; United States
- Frequency: 93.5 MHz
- Branding: Country 93.5

Programming
- Format: Country

Ownership
- Owner: Cochise Broadcasting LLC
- Sister stations: KGRK, KCYA

History
- First air date: 2009

Technical information
- Licensing authority: FCC
- Facility ID: 166051
- Class: C1
- ERP: 3,800 watts
- HAAT: 530 meters (1,740 ft)
- Transmitter coordinates: 42°44′28″N 106°18′31″W

Links
- Public license information: Public file; LMS
- Website: kwyx.com

KWYX (93.5 FM) is a radio station licensed to Casper, Wyoming, United States. The station is currently owned by Cochise Broadcasting LLC.

The station began as a construction permit in 2006. The station received its license to cover on June 5, 2009. It has been a country station its entire life.

In 2017, the FCC found that several stations owned by Cochise Broadcasting were silent, including KWYX. KWYX along with several others were agreed upon to be divested and converted to non-commercial status. Several of the stations in the decision were donated to the University of Wyoming. Cochise was able to keep its Casper stations.

The station transmitter is located on Casper Mountain, south of the city of Casper.
