= KGRK =

- Glenrock, Wyoming; United States
- Broadcast area: Casper, Wyoming
- Frequency: 98.5 MHz
- Branding: Mix 98.5 FM

Programming
- Format: Classic and contemporary hits

Ownership
- Owner: Cochise Broadcasting LLC
- Sister stations: KWYX, KCYA

History
- First air date: June 7, 2007
- Former frequencies: 98.3 MHz (2007–2010)

Technical information
- Licensing authority: FCC
- Facility ID: 88725
- Class: C1
- ERP: 3,500 watts
- HAAT: 518 meters (1,699 ft)
- Transmitter coordinates: 42°44′28″N 106°18′31″W

Links
- Public license information: Public file; LMS
- Website: casperradio.com

KGRK (98.5 FM) is a radio station broadcasting a classic hits format. Licensed to Glenrock, Wyoming, United States, the station serves the Casper area. The station is currently owned by Cochise Broadcasting LLC. Along with broadcasting classic hits, the station also has more variety in its formatting. It carries some contemporary hits, along with songs from the 70s through the 2000s. The station features no commercials, but has radio personalities. The station's transmitter is located on Casper Mountain.

KGRK started as a construction permit in 2004. The station received its license to cover on June 7, 2007. It was originally owned by Michael Radio Group, and was on 98.3 FM.

The station was sold to Cochise Broadcasting in 2010, and moved to 98.5 FM. The station was part of a decision by the FCC to divest stations owned by Cochise to non-commercial entities. The reason for this divestiture was because the stations were off air or broadcasting silence for long periods of time. Several of the stations in the decision were donated to the University of Wyoming. Cochise was able to keep its Casper stations.
