= KXXL =

Radio station in Moorcroft, Wyoming

- Moorcroft, Wyoming; United States
- Broadcast area: Gillette, Wyoming
- Frequency: 106.1 MHz
- Branding: KOAL 106.1

Programming
- Format: Classic rock

Ownership
- Owner: Keyhole Broadcasting, LLC
- Sister stations: KGCC, KQOL

History
- Former call signs: KPKL (2007–2008)

Technical information
- Licensing authority: FCC
- Facility ID: 164171
- Class: C1
- ERP: 100,000 watts
- HAAT: 119.6 meters (392 ft)
- Transmitter coordinates: 44°13′50″N 105°27′45″W

Links
- Public license information: Public file; LMS

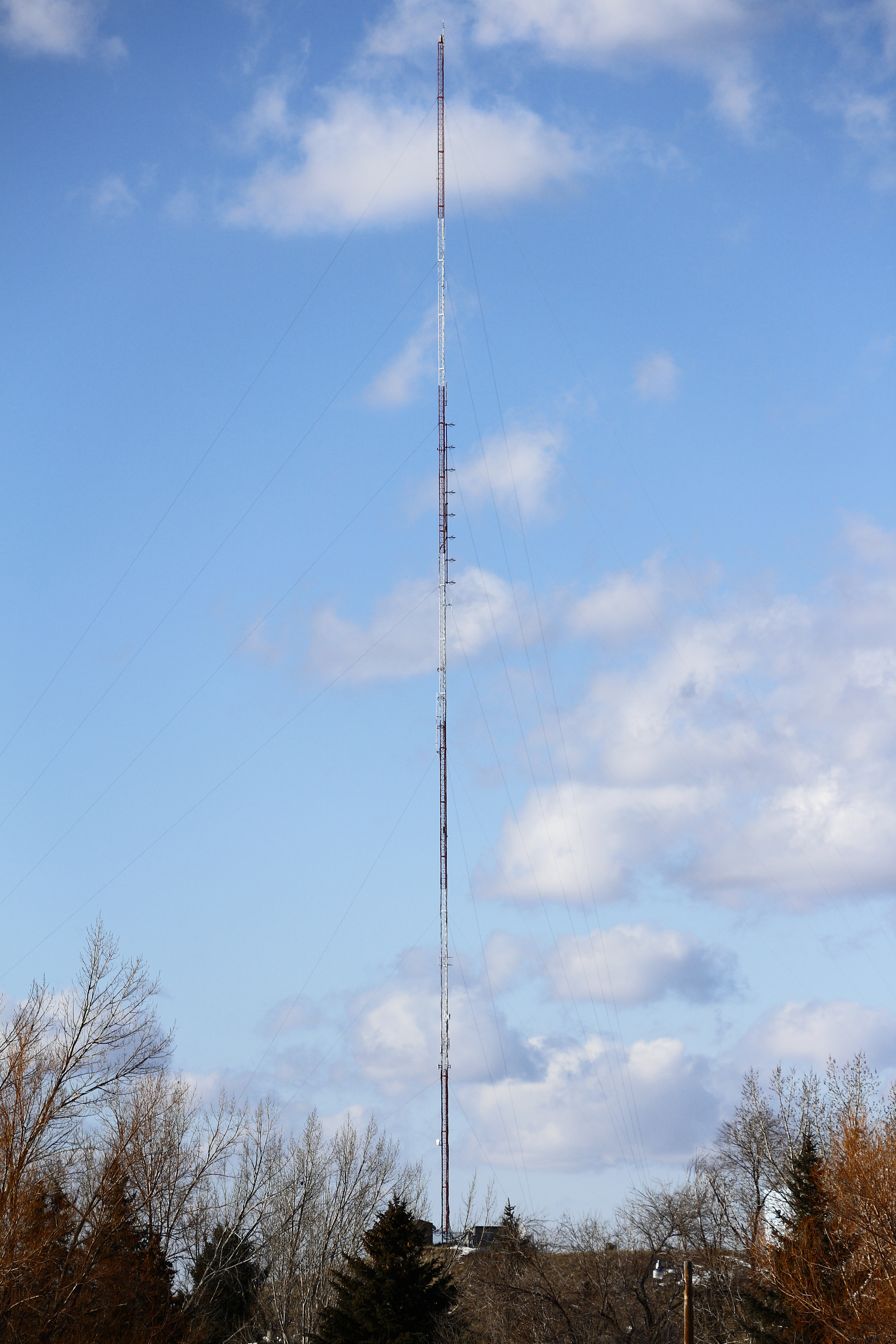
Transmitter located at 44°13′50″N 105°27′45″W in Gillette, Wyoming used by KXXL

KXXL (106.1 FM) is a radio station licensed to Moorcroft, Wyoming, United States. The station has a Classic rock format, and is currently owned by Keyhole Broadcasting, LLC.

Although the station is licensed to Moorcroft, the transmitter is in Gillette. Moorcroft was simply an allotment by the Federal Communications Commission.

== History ==
The station's history under the current ownership began when it was assigned the call letters KPKL on September 7, 2007. The call sign was officially changed to its current KXXL on June 11, 2008. KXXL is owned by Keyhole Broadcasting, LLC, and operates as part of a three-station cluster serving the local market.
