= KRKU =

- Wheatland, Wyoming; United States
- Frequency: 106.5 MHz

Programming
- Format: Defunct

Ownership
- Owner: Lorenz E. Proietti

History
- Former call signs: KKHI (2008); KQMS (2008–2012)

Technical information
- Licensing authority: FCC
- Facility ID: 166044
- Class: A
- ERP: 100 watts
- HAAT: 6 meters
- Transmitter coordinates: 41°56′09.8″N 104°55′48.8″W

Links
- Public license information: Public file; LMS

KRKU (106.5 FM) was a radio station with an FCC-issued license to cover to serve Wheatland, Wyoming, United States. The station was owned by Lorenz E. Proietti.

== History ==
This station received its original construction permit from the Federal Communications Commission on December 29, 2006. The new station was assigned the call sign KKHI by the FCC on February 7, 2008. On July 3, 2008, the station changed its call sign to KMQS. The station's revised construction permit was scheduled to expire on December 29, 2009. The station's license to cover was issued on December 30, 2009.

On June 21, 2012, the station changed its call sign to the current KRKU.

On February 24, 2014, KRKU's owner surrendered the station's license to the FCC, who subsequently cancelled the license on February 26, 2014.
