= KZJH =

- Jackson, Wyoming; United States
- Broadcast area: Jackson, Wyoming
- Frequency: 95.3 MHz
- Branding: KZ 953

Programming
- Format: Classic rock
- Affiliations: ABC News Radio; United Stations Radio Networks

Ownership
- Owner: Scott Anderson; (Jackson Hole Radio, LLC)
- Sister stations: KJAX, KMTN, KSGT

History
- First air date: July 13, 1989
- Call sign meaning: Jackson

Technical information
- Licensing authority: FCC
- Facility ID: 65279
- Class: C
- ERP: 100,000 watts
- HAAT: 322 meters (1,056 ft)
- Transmitter coordinates: 43°27′40″N 110°45′9″W
- Translators: 95.7 K239AU (Driggs, Idaho); 100.7 K264DC (Teton Village, etc.)

Links
- Public license information: Public file; LMS
- Webcast: Listen live
- Website: kz95.live

KZJH (95.3 FM) is a radio station broadcasting a classic rock format. Licensed to Jackson, Wyoming, United States, the station is owned by Scott Anderson, through licensee Jackson Hole Radio, LLC.

Anderson had managed the stations since 1990 and hosted on air shifts on KMTN while also covering local news. Anderson, who also has served as the chairperson of the Jackson Hole Chamber of Commerce, was an elected Jackson, Wyoming town councilperson between 1992 and 2006. The studios for the station were located at the corner of Wyoming Highway 22, and U.S. Route 89.

== History ==
In 2012, Chaparral Broadcasting sold KZJH and seven other stations to Rich Broadcasting for $3.7 million; the transaction was consummated on April 1, 2013. Under Rich Broadcasting, KZJH and its sister FM stations were threatened to be shut off for a period of time due to a tower dispute with American Tower. The station was renting space on a tower, and was behind $500,000. Rich Broadcasting's issues with American Tower began to involve United States Senators Orrin Hatch of Utah, and John Barrasso of Wyoming.

A U.S. bankruptcy court judge in Utah ruled that American Tower could not turn off the radio stations unless a deal was reached.

Rich Broadcasting sold KZJH, three other stations, and four translators to Scott Anderson's Jackson Hold Radio, LLC effective March 16, 2020.
