= KIML =

- Gillette, Wyoming; United States
- Frequency: 1270 kHz

Ownership
- Owner: Legend Communications of Wyoming, LLC
- Sister stations: KAML-FM, KDDV-FM, KGWY, KLED

History
- First air date: September 1957
- Last air date: April 12, 2024

Technical information
- Licensing authority: FCC
- Facility ID: 24212
- Class: D
- Power: 1,000 watts (day); 40 watts (night)
- Transmitter coordinates: 44°18′9.2″N 105°29′52.8″W
- Translators: 106.7 K294BD (Gillette); 107.5 K298CT (Gillette)

Links
- Public license information: Public file; LMS

KIML (1270 AM) was a radio station licensed to Gillette, Wyoming, United States. Last owned by the Basin Radio Network, a division of Legend Communications of Wyoming, LLC., it carried a talk radio format at closure and featured programming from Fox News Radio and Wyoming Cowboys sports.

KIML and its four sister stations, KAML-FM, KGWY, KLED and KDDV, are located at 2810 Southern Drive, Gillette. KIML's transmitter site was north of town, on Hannum Road. The translator for KIML shared a tower with KGWY and KLED near the station's studios.

== History ==
The station went on the air as KIML at 1490 kHz in September 1957, initially owned by Gillette Broadcasting Company. The transmitter was located at 405 Lakeside Avenue, along with the studio. The area has since been redeveloped and the transmitter was relocated north to its final location, near the Gillette Gun Club. The station stayed on 1490 for the next nine years, before switching to 1270 kHz in 1966, and increasing power from 250 watts to 1,000 watts day, and 5,000 watts night with a directional pattern.

In the late 1970s, the station carried a country music format. The station was at one time involved in the decision by the Federal Communications Commission (FCC) to implement AM stereo. Then-owner Roy A. Napel wrote to the FCC expressing disappointment that a system had not been chosen yet. AM Stereo had its roots as far back as the 1920s, but the FCC let the marketplace decide the system to approve, which resulted in stations broadcasting stereo using different standards. It would not be until the 1980s before Motorola's C-QUAM system began taking hold. The standard was short-lived, and it is unknown whether KIML ever broadcast in AM stereo.

KIML once carried the program "Sound of 77", provided by Billboard Broadcasting Company.

Legend Communications acquired KIML and sister KAML-FM in 2006.

In April 2015, KIML began broadcasting using an FM translator on 106.7 FM. The translator previously carried programming from KQFR in Rapid City, South Dakota. It then began broadcasting on a translator on 107.5 FM.

In 2019, the Basin Radio Group, including KIML, named Ted Peiffer as their general manager. Peiffer had experience working in radio in the Rapid City market.

In 2024, the ownership of Legend Communications underwent a major restructuring. Co-owner Susan K. Patrick was sentenced to prison for tax fraud, which included evading taxes on millions of dollars in income. She was ordered to pay restitution exceeding $3.8 million. Following this, her ex-husband and co-founder, W. Lawrence Patrick, filed an application with the FCC to become the sole owner of Legend Communications, taking over Susan Patrick's 50% stake.

On April 12, 2024, the license for KIML and its translator were cancelled by Legend Communications. The station ceased on air operations the same day. The FCC cancelled the station’s license on April 26, 2024. The station had a pending application to move the tower closer to its studios, which Legend chose not to follow through with.
