= KTED =

Currently silent
- Evansville, Wyoming; United States
- Broadcast area: Casper, Wyoming
- Frequency: 100.5 MHz
- Branding: 100.5 KTED

Programming
- Format: Active rock
- Affiliations: Compass Media Networks; United Stations Radio Networks

Ownership
- Owner: Robert D. Breck, Jr.; (Breck Media Group Wyoming, Inc.)
- Sister stations: KZQL, KMXW, KWBB

History
- First air date: May 2008
- Former frequencies: 100.9 MHz (2005–2007)

Technical information
- Licensing authority: FCC
- Facility ID: 164285
- Class: C1
- ERP: 10,000 watts
- HAAT: 437 meters (1,434 ft)
- Transmitter coordinates: 42°45′30″N 106°19′23″W

Links
- Public license information: Public file; LMS
- Webcast: Listen live
- Website: wyomingrocks.com

KTED (100.5 FM) is a radio station licensed to Evansville, Wyoming, United States, the station serves the Casper area. It broadcasts an active rock format. The station is owned by Robert D. Breck Jr., through licensee Breck Media Group Wyoming, Inc.

== History ==
KTED began as a construction permit on 100.9 in 2005, owned by White Park Broadcasting. At the time, the station was licensed to Douglas, Wyoming. As a construction permit, the city of license was changed to Evansville, and the frequency was changed to 100.5. The station received its license to cover on March 28, 2006. The station was sold to the Casper Radio Group in 2009. It was sold to the current owners in April 2016.

The station was also heard on KHAD in Upton, covering the northeastern corner of Wyoming. As of August 24, 2021, KHAD was no longer simulcasting KTED, but was instead running an automated, commercial-free selection of classic hits with a station ID twice an hour. That station changed call letters to KWBB.

The station has maintained the same format since its sign on. In 2023, the station was granted a modification to move its transmitter to Tower Hill, on Casper Mountain, where its sister stations broadcast from. Previously, the station was broadcasting from a transmitter closer to the face of Casper Mountain.

On July 10, 2026, KTED went silent due to equipment and financial issues.
