= KSGT =

- Jackson, Wyoming; United States
- Frequency: 1340 kHz
- Branding: La Nueva Live

Programming
- Language: Spanish
- Format: Contemporary hit radio

Ownership
- Owner: Scott Anderson; (Jackson Hole Radio, LLC)
- Sister stations: KJAX, KMTN, KZJH

History
- First air date: 1962
- Call sign meaning: Shadow of the Grand Teton

Technical information
- Licensing authority: FCC
- Facility ID: 10338
- Class: C
- Power: 1,000 watts
- Transmitter coordinates: 43°27′45″N 110°47′37″W
- Translator: 96.3 K242BU (Jackson)

Links
- Public license information: Public file; LMS
- Website: jacksonholeradio.com

KSGT (1340 AM) is a radio station licensed to Jackson, Wyoming, United States. The station is owned by Scott Anderson through licensee Jackson Hole Radio, LLC. KSGT's current transmitter is located on Martin Lane west of U.S. Route 191.

== History ==
KSGT signed on the air on November 21, 1962. Its transmitter was located north of the city limits, near U.S. Route 89. The studios at the time were located upstairs on the second floor of the Wort Hotel.. The station was limited to 250 watts. In July 1969, the station increased power to 1,000 watts. The station carried "popular music". In 1975, the studios moved to the base of Snow King Mountain on Cache Street. Paul Knowles was General Manager.

Prior to 2012, the station was owned by Chaparral Broadcasting. The studios for the station were located at the corner of Wyoming Highway 22, and U.S. Route 89.

In 2012, the station was sold to Rich Broadcasting, becoming a sister station to KID in Idaho. Following the sale, the station aired a talk radio format, simulcast with KID. It also carried Country music.

Under Rich Broadcasting, KSGT's sister FM stations were threatened to be shut off for a period of time due to a tower dispute with American Tower. The station was renting space on a tower, and was behind $500,000. Rich Broadcasting's issues with American Tower began to involve United States Senators Orrin Hatch of Utah, and John Barrasso of Wyoming.

KSGT was sold again in 2019 to Scott Anderson, who received four full-power stations and four translators in the sale, KSGT being one of them.

Also, in 2019, the station changed formats. KSGT was the first station in Jackson to carry a Spanish language format. This includes local programming.
