= KWBB =

- Upton, Wyoming; United States
- Frequency: 104.5 MHz
- Branding: 104.5 Bob FM

Programming
- Format: Adult hits

Ownership
- Owner: Robert D. Breck, Jr.; (Breck Media Group Wyoming, Inc.)
- Sister stations: KMXW; KTED; KZQL

History
- First air date: 2009
- Former call signs: KRUG (2006–2009); KHAD (2009–2023)
- Call sign meaning: Wyoming Bob

Technical information
- Licensing authority: FCC
- Facility ID: 166003
- Class: C
- ERP: 85,000 watts
- HAAT: 479 meters (1,572 ft)
- Transmitter coordinates: 44°28′29″N 104°26′27″W

Links
- Public license information: Public file; LMS

KWBB (104.5 FM, "Bob FM") is an radio station licensed to Upton, Wyoming, United States. The station, established in 2009, is currently owned by Robert D. Breck, Jr., through licensee Breck Media Group Wyoming, Inc., and carries an adult hits format.

== History ==
The station received its original construction permit from the Federal Communications Commission on June 28, 2006, and was assigned the call sign KRUG by the FCC on October 30, 2006. The station, still under construction, flipped its call sign to KHAD on April 2, 2009, in a swap with a sister station in Mills, Wyoming, now known as KZQL.

In May 2009, White Park Broadcasting, Inc., reached an agreement to sell KHAD to The Casper Radio Group, Inc. The deal was approved by the FCC on June 5, 2009, and the transaction was consummated the same day. KHAD received its license to cover from the FCC on June 8, 2009.

Originally, the call sign KHAD had been assigned to an AM station in De Soto, Missouri, in 1968. This station closed in the late 1990s.

On January 13, 2023, the station fell silent due to icing on the antenna array damaging parts of the transmitter. The station requested additional time to remain silent while parts were ordered for the transmitter. On August 14, 2023, the station flipped its call sign to the present KWBB, and began a stunt of jockless classic hits music, interrupted only by a legal ID twice per hour.

Effective September 22, 2023, Casper Radio Group sold KWBB to Breck Media Group Wyoming, Inc. for $85,000. The classic hits stunt lasted until the start of October, when the station launched an adult hits format under the Bob FM brand.
