= KQCO =

- Esterbrook, Wyoming; United States
- Frequency: 89.5 MHz

Programming
- Format: Defunct

Ownership
- Owner: Cedar Cove Broadcasting

History
- First air date: 2011
- Former call signs: KEZG (2008); KGCY (2008–2010)

Technical information
- Licensing authority: FCC
- Facility ID: 175367
- Class: C1
- ERP: 900 watts
- HAAT: 0 meters (0 ft)
- Transmitter coordinates: 42°16′6″N 105°26′31″W

Links
- Public license information: Public file; LMS

KQCO (89.5 FM) was a radio station licensed to serve Esterbrook, Wyoming, United States. The station was owned by Cedar Cove Broadcasting.

== History ==
The station was assigned the call letters KEZG on February 6, 2008. On July 3, 2008, the station changed its call sign to KGCY; on November 15, 2010, it took its present KQCO call sign. The station filed for a license to cover its construction permit on January 5, 2011; however, on March 23, the station left the air due to problems with its programming source. KQCO returned to the air on March 20, 2012; two days later, it again signed off citing snow and ice damage to the solar power array at its Laramie Peak transmitter site. It again returned on March 20, 2013, but shut down again five days later due to continued repairs to the solar power array.

KQCO's owners surrendered the station's license to the Federal Communications Commission (FCC) on March 31, 2014; the FCC cancelled the license on April 1, 2014.
