= KZQL =

Currently silent
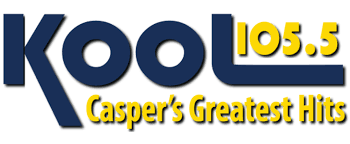
- Mills, Wyoming; United States
- Broadcast area: Casper, Wyoming
- Frequency: 105.5 MHz
- Branding: KOOL 105.5

Programming
- Format: Classic hits
- Affiliations: Compass Media Networks; Premiere Networks

Ownership
- Owner: Robert D. Breck, Jr.; (Breck Media Group Wyoming, Inc.)
- Sister stations: KMXW, KTED, KWBB

History
- First air date: 2008; 18 years ago
- Former call signs: KHAD (2005–2009)

Technical information
- Licensing authority: FCC
- Facility ID: 164289
- Class: C1
- ERP: 5,000 watts
- HAAT: 518 meters (1,699 ft)
- Transmitter coordinates: 42°44′30″N 106°18′23″W

Links
- Public license information: Public file; LMS
- Webcast: Listen Live
- Website: caspersgreatesthits.com

KZQL (105.5 FM, "KOOL 105.5") is a radio station licensed to serve Mills, Wyoming, United States. The station, which began licensed broadcasting in 2008, is owned by Robert D. Breck, Jr., through licensee Breck Media Group Wyoming, Inc.

KZQL broadcasts a classic hits format to the Casper, Wyoming, area.

On Sundays the station airs Casey Kasem's American Top 40: The '70s. The station also features WeatherBug weather forecasts, as well as ABC Radio newscasts throughout the day.

== History ==
This station received its original construction permit from the Federal Communications Commission on March 9, 2005. The new station was assigned the call letters KHAD by the FCC on April 7, 2005. KHAD received its license to cover from the FCC on April 18, 2008.

The station was assigned the current KZQL call sign by the Federal Communications Commission on April 2, 2009.

The station previously broadcast an adult hits format under the name "The Vibe", until recently switching to the classic hits format under its new name "KOOL 105.5".

On July 10, 2026, KZQL went silent due to equipment and financial issues.

== Construction permit ==
On February 23, 2009, KZQL was granted a new construction permit to increase its effective radiated power to 17,000 watts, lower the broadcast antenna's height above average terrain to 506 meters (1660 feet), and move the transmitter site slightly northeast to 42°44'30"N, 106°18'29"W. This permit expired on February 23, 2012.
