= KMXW =

Currently silent
- Bar Nunn, Wyoming; United States
- Broadcast area: Casper metropolitan area
- Frequency: 92.5 MHz
- Branding: 92.5 Hank FM

Programming
- Format: Classic country
- Affiliations: Compass Media Networks; Westwood One

Ownership
- Owner: Robert D. Breck, Jr.; (Breck Media Group Wyoming, Inc.)
- Sister stations: KTED, KWBB, KZQL

History
- First air date: 2007
- Former call signs: KBOG (2005–2006, CP); KDAD (2006–2016)
- Call sign meaning: Max Wyoming (former branding)

Technical information
- Licensing authority: FCC
- Facility ID: 164286
- Class: C2
- ERP: 3,100 watts
- HAAT: 521 meters (1,709 ft)
- Transmitter coordinates: 42°44′30″N 106°18′23″W

Links
- Public license information: Public file; LMS
- Webcast: Listen live
- Website: breckmediagroup.com/hankfm/

KMXW (92.5 FM), also known as "92.5 Hank FM" is a radio station broadcasting a classic country radio format. The station previously broadcast a country music format, and was known as "New Country 92.5" under the call letters KDAD. Before that, it was known as "Buckin' Country". Licensed to Bar Nunn, Wyoming, the station is owned by Robert D. Breck Jr, through licensee Breck Media Group Wyoming, Inc. It was formerly licensed to Douglas, Wyoming.

== History ==
The station was assigned the call letters KBOG on April 7, 2005. On February 13, 2006, the station changed its call sign to KDAD. In 2016 it changed its call sign to KMXW, as it flipped to a CHR format under the name Max 925. On November 9, 2006, the station was sold to White Park Broadcasting, and on June 19, 2009, it was sold to the Casper Radio Group. Effective May 13, 2016, KDAD and sister stations KTED and KZQL were sold to Breck Media Group Wyoming, Inc. for $963,000.

On July 10, 2026, KMXW went silent due to equipment and financial issues.
