= KDDV-FM =

- Wright, Wyoming; United States
- Broadcast area: Gillette, Wyoming
- Frequency: 101.5 MHz
- Branding: The Drive

Programming
- Format: Classic rock
- Affiliations: Compass Media Networks

Ownership
- Owner: Legend Communications of Wyoming, LLC
- Sister stations: KAML-FM, KGWY, KLED

History
- First air date: 2008

Technical information
- Licensing authority: FCC
- Facility ID: 165980
- Class: C0
- ERP: 100,000 watts
- HAAT: 334.7 meters (1,098 ft)
- Transmitter coordinates: 43°59′57″N 105°15′15″W

Links
- Public license information: Public file; LMS
- Webcast: Listen live
- Website: basinsradio.com

KDDV-FM (101.5 FM) is a radio station licensed to Wright, Wyoming, United States. It airs a classic rock format. The station is currently owned by Legend Communications of Wyoming, LLC.

KDDV-FM and its three sister stations, KIML, KAML-FM, and KGWY, are located at 2810 Southern Drive, Gillette. KAML-FM and KDDV-FM share a transmitter site south of Gillette, on a tower that is the tallest man-made structure in the state.

== Previous logo ==
(KDDV's logo under previous classic hits format)
