= KTDM =

Radio station in Wheatland, Wyoming

- Wheatland, Wyoming; United States
- Frequency: 107.5 MHz

Programming
- Format: Defunct

Ownership
- Owner: Victor and Van Michael; (Michael Radio Group)

History
- First air date: June 25, 2009
- Former call signs: KPAD (2006–2013); KLLM (2013–2014)

Technical information
- Licensing authority: FCC
- Facility ID: 166006
- Class: A
- ERP: 530 watts
- HAAT: 333 meters
- Transmitter coordinates: 41°49′0″N 105°3′48″W

Links
- Public license information: Public file; LMS

KTDM (107.5 FM) was a radio station licensed to Wheatland, Wyoming, United States. The station was owned by Victor and Van Michael, through licensee Michael Radio Group.

On August 27, 2014, the station's owners notified the Federal Communications Commission that KTDM had been silent since June 13, 2013, and requested cancellation of the station's license.
