= KGWY =

- Gillette, Wyoming; United States
- Frequency: 100.7 MHz
- Branding: Fox Country 100.7

Programming
- Format: Country music
- Affiliations: Premiere Networks

Ownership
- Owner: Legend Communications of Wyoming, Inc.; (Basin Radio Network)
- Sister stations: KAML-FM, KDDV-FM, KIML-FM

History
- First air date: January 18, 1983
- Call sign meaning: Gillette, Wyoming

Technical information
- Licensing authority: FCC
- Facility ID: 54044
- Class: C1
- ERP: 100,000 watts
- HAAT: 189 meters (620 ft)
- Transmitter coordinates: 44°14′35″N 105°32′19″W

Links
- Public license information: Public file; LMS
- Website: basinsradio.com

KGWY (100.7 FM) is a radio station broadcasting a country music format. Licensed to Gillette, Wyoming, United States, the station is currently owned by Basin Radio Network, a division of Legend Communications of Wyoming, LLC.

KGWY and its three sister stations, KIML, KAML-FM, and KDDV are located at 2810 Southern Drive, Gillette. The KGWY transmitter site is on Rain Dancer Court, close to the radio studios.

The station, along with its sister stations, has been publicly recognized for its community efforts, raising over $100,000 during its annual St. Jude Radiothons.

== History ==
The station was assigned the call sign KGWY on January 18, 1983, as Y-100, a Top-40 station.

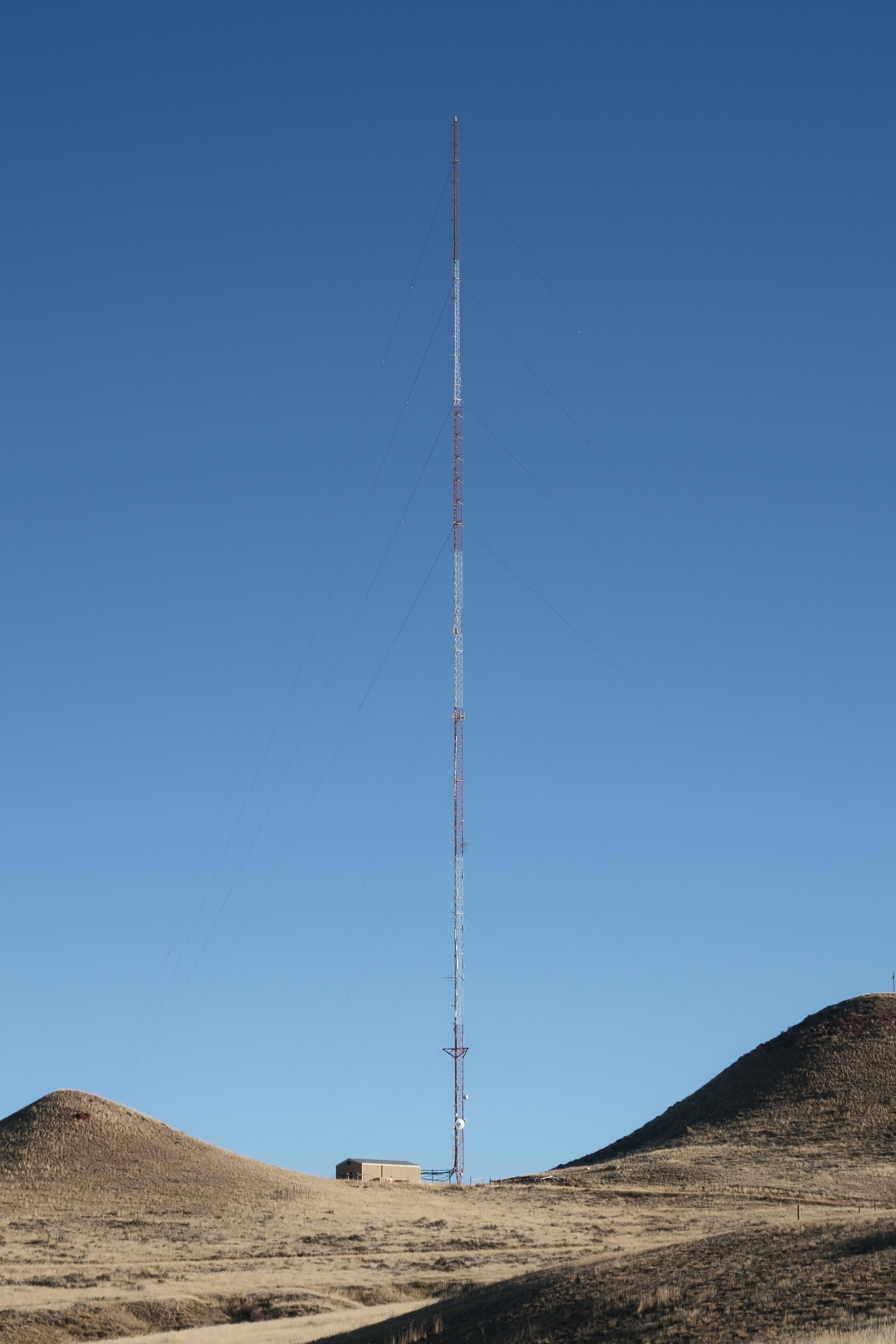
Transmitter used by KGWY located at 44°14′35″N 105°32′19″W in Gillette, Wyoming. Sister station KIML-FM also broadcasts from this tower.

In 2024, the ownership of Legend Communications underwent a major restructuring. Co-owner Susan K. Patrick was sentenced to prison for tax fraud, which included evading taxes on millions of dollars in income. She was ordered to pay restitution exceeding $3.8 million. Following this, her ex-husband and co-founder, W. Lawrence Patrick, filed an application with the FCC to become the sole owner of Legend Communications, taking over Susan Patrick's 50% stake.
