= KIMX =

- Centennial, Wyoming; United States
- Broadcast area: Laramie-Cheyenne, Wyoming
- Frequency: 104.5 MHz
- Branding: iMix 104.5

Programming
- Format: Contemporary hit radio

Ownership
- Owner: Wolf Creek Radio Bradcasting, Inc
- Sister stations: KHAT, KLMI, KRQU,

History
- First air date: 2013
- Former call signs: KYAP (2012–2016)
- Call sign meaning: "iMix"

Technical information
- Licensing authority: FCC
- Facility ID: 190378
- Class: C2
- ERP: 13,500 watts
- HAAT: 284 meters (932 ft)
- Transmitter coordinates: 41°17′49″N 106°08′23″W

Links
- Public license information: Public file; LMS
- Webcast: Listen live
- Website: imixwyoming.com

KIMX (104.5 FM, "iMix 104.5") is a contemporary hit radio station licensed to Centennial, Wyoming, United States. The station is currently owned by White Park Broadcasting.

== History ==
The station's lineage dates back to 2013, when it first went on air under the call sign KYAP.

The current "iMix" branding and Top 40 (CHR) format originated on a separate frequency, 96.7 MHz, where the station was also known as KIMX. The format was known to be operational in the Laramie area as far back as 2001 under the KIMX call sign.

In November 2016, the Top 40 programming branded as "iMix" was moved from the weaker 96.7 MHz signal to the new 104.5 MHz facility.

The call letters were subsequently swapped, with KIMX moving to 104.5 FM (formerly KYAP).

This swap allowed the 96.7 MHz frequency to complete a separate move to 96.9 MHz in Nunn, Colorado. Originally broadcasting from Centennial, the station has pursued construction permits to relocate its transmitter site to a higher elevation location near its sister stations on Pilot Hill east of Laramie, significantly increasing its reach into Laramie, and Cheyenne.
