= KJXN =

- South Park, Wyoming; United States
- Broadcast area: Jackson, Wyoming
- Frequency: 105.1 MHz

Programming
- Format: Adult contemporary

Ownership
- Owner: Cochise Media Licenses, LLC
- Sister stations: KXJN

History
- First air date: 2005
- Former call signs: KTYN (2005–2008); KRFD (2008–2009)

Technical information
- Licensing authority: FCC
- Facility ID: 164154
- Class: C3
- ERP: 900 watts
- HAAT: 327 meters (1,073 ft)
- Transmitter coordinates: 43°27′42″N 110°45′12″W

Links
- Public license information: Public file; LMS

KJXN (105.1 FM) is a radio station licensed to South Park, Wyoming, United States. The station is currently owned by Cochise Media Licenses, LLC.

== History ==
The station’s construction permit was first granted in early 2005. It officially signed on the air on April 21, 2005, utilizing the call sign KTYN. During its early years, the station experimented with various adult-oriented music formats as it sought to establish a foothold in the competitive Jackson radio market.

In April 2008, the station briefly changed its call letters to KRFD, but this was short-lived. On April 17, 2009, the station adopted its current KJXN call sign.

KJXN is part of the Cochise Media Licenses cluster, a group known for operating regional signals across the Western United States. Its primary sister station in the Jackson market is KXJN (97.7 FM), which is licensed to Moose Wilson Road.

In December 2014, the FCC issued a $7,000 fine (monetary forfeiture) to Cochise Broadcasting for violations related to the maintenance of a main studio. An FCC inspection revealed that KJXN (along with its sister stations) failed to maintain a meaningful management and staff presence at its local studio, a requirement at the time intended to ensure stations remained responsive to their local community of license.

The most significant action occurred in May 2017, when the FCC's Media Bureau entered into a comprehensive Consent Decree with Cochise Media Licenses to resolve "long-term, chronic failures to operate."

KJXN was designated as a "Retained Station," meaning Cochise was allowed to keep the license only if the station resumed full-time operation within 90 days of the order. The station was granted only a short-term license renewal to allow the FCC to monitor its compliance with local service obligations.

While KJXN was retained by Cochise, the same 2017 order forced the company to surrender or donate several other Wyoming licenses that had remained silent for years. This included KTWY (Shoshoni), KWWY (Shoshoni), and KXWY (Hudson).
