= KCYA =

- Rolling Hills, Wyoming; United States
- Broadcast area: Casper, Wyoming
- Frequency: 97.7 MHz
- Branding: Magic 97.7

Programming
- Format: Adult standards

Ownership
- Owner: Cochise Media Licenses LLC
- Sister stations: KWYX, KGRK

History
- First air date: 2010
- Call sign meaning: Casper, Wyoming

Technical information
- Licensing authority: FCC
- Facility ID: 166055
- Class: C2
- ERP: 3,600 watts
- HAAT: 506 meters (1,660 ft)
- Transmitter coordinates: 42°44′28″N 106°18′31″W

Links
- Public license information: Public file; LMS
- Website: kcyafm.com

KCYA (97.7 FM) is a radio station licensed to Rolling Hills, Wyoming, United States. The station is currently owned by Cochise Media Licenses LLC. The station broadcasts from atop Casper Mountain.

== History ==
KCYA started as a construction permit in June 2006. It was originally licensed to Kaycee, Wyoming, north of Casper, and was owned by Skywest Media, LLC. It received a license to cover in 2009, and was initially broadcasting to Kaycee and the immediate area. In October 2009, the station changed its city of license to Rolling Hills, Wyoming, a small community east of Casper. The station broadcast with 50,000 watts, and covered eastern Casper to Douglas, Wyoming. The station was moved again in 2010 to Casper Mountain, retaining the city of license. Like its sister stations, KCYA experienced long periods of silence. The FCC took notice of this, and forced owner Cochise Broadcasting to divest some of its stations, turning them into non-commercial entities. Several of the stations in the decision were donated to the University of Wyoming. Cochise was able to keep its Casper stations.
