= KXZT =

Simulcasts KRKI, Keystone
- Newell, South Dakota; United States
- Broadcast area: Deadwood, South Dakota
- Frequency: 107.9 MHz
- Branding: 99.5 The Mine

Programming
- Format: Classic country
- Affiliations: ABC News Radio

Ownership
- Owner: Mid-Century Radio
- Sister stations: KFMH; KRKI

Technical information
- Licensing authority: FCC
- Facility ID: 164201
- Class: C2
- ERP: 4,800 watts
- HAAT: 455 meters (1,493 ft)
- Transmitter coordinates: 44°19′40″N 103°50′6″W

Links
- Public license information: Public file; LMS
- Website: www.995themine.com

KXZT (107.9 FM) is an American radio station licensed by the Federal Communications Commission (FCC) to broadcast from Newell, South Dakota, covering the Rapid City and Black Hills area. On April 14, 2017, it went on air as a simulcast tower for KRKI. The tower is owned and operated by Mid-Century Radio. KXZT serves the Northern Black Hills including Lead, Deadwood, Spearfish, Belle Fourche, and Sundance, WY.

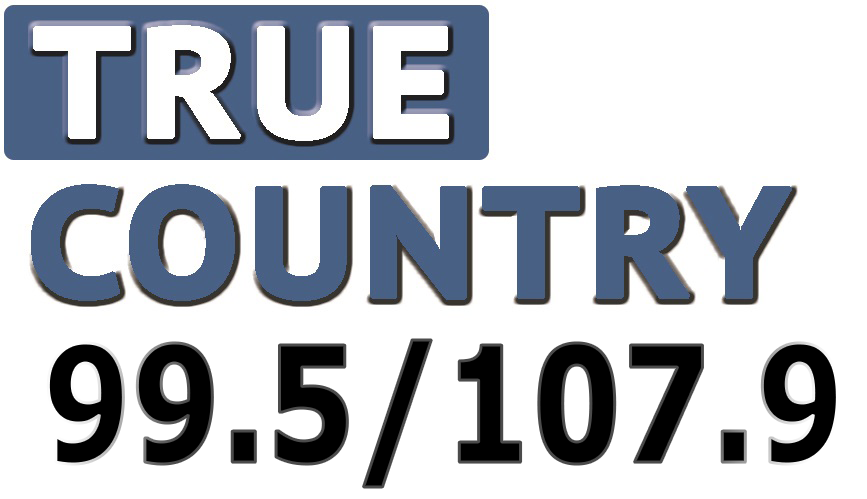
Previous logo
