= KJUA =

Radio station in Cheyenne, Wyoming (1952–2018)

- Cheyenne, Wyoming; United States
- Broadcast area: Cheyenne area
- Frequency: 1380 kHz

Programming
- Format: Defunct (formerly classic hip-hop)

Ownership
- Owner: La Familia Broadcasting, LLC
- Sister stations: KFBU

History
- First air date: 1952
- Last air date: January 2, 2018
- Former call signs: KVWO (1952–1978); KSHY (1978–1996); KJJL (1996–2005)

Technical information
- Facility ID: 54740
- Class: D
- Power: 1,000 watts (day); 8 watts (night)
- Transmitter coordinates: 41°7′22″N 104°48′7″W

KJUA (1380 AM) was a radio station broadcasting a Classic Hip-Hop format. Licensed to Cheyenne, Wyoming, United States, the station was owned by La Familia Broadcasting, LLC.

== History ==
The station signed on in 1952 as KVWO on the slightly different frequency of 1370 kHz.

The station was assigned the KSHY call sign on June 9, 1978.

In 1988, while operating as KSHY, the station received a construction permit to change its frequency from 1370 kHz to 1530 kHz. This move also included a change in the station's community of license to Fox Farm, Wyoming. On September 16, 1996, KSHY changed its call sign to KJJL.

=== Expanded Band assignment ===
On March 17, 1997, the Federal Communications Commission (FCC) announced that eighty-eight stations had been given permission to move to newly available "Expanded Band" transmitting frequencies, ranging from 1610 to 1700 kHz. This authorization allowed KJJL (operating as KSHY at the time) to modify its construction permit for 1530 kHz to instead create a new station on 1630 kHz.

A construction permit for the expanded band station on 1630 kHz was assigned the call letters KKWY (now KFBU) on November 21, 1997. The FCC's initial policy was that both the original station and its expanded band counterpart could operate simultaneously for up to five years, after which owners would have to turn in one of the two licenses, depending on whether they preferred the new assignment or elected to remain on the original frequency, although this deadline was extended multiple times.

=== Later history ===
In 2002, the station made a technical arrangement to move its operating frequency from 1370 kHz to 1380 kHz. This adjustment was made to allow a nearby station, KHNC on 1360 kHz in Johnstown, Colorado, to increase its transmission power. On April 10, 2005, KJJL changed its call sign to KJUA.

KJUA permanently discontinued operations and submitted its license for cancellation on January 2, 2018. The FCC formally cancelled the license and deleted the call sign from its database on March 18, 2019. The cancellation was reported in industry newsletters like the International Radio Club of America's DX Monitor.
