= KJAX =

- Jackson, Wyoming; United States
- Broadcast area: Jackson Hole
- Frequency: 93.5 MHz
- Branding: KJAX Country 93.5

Programming
- Format: Country music
- Affiliations: ABC News Radio

Ownership
- Owner: Scott Anderson; (Jackson Hole Radio, LLC)
- Sister stations: KMTN, KSGT, KZJH

History
- First air date: 2000
- Former call signs: KBHJ (1998–2000)
- Former frequencies: 93.3 MHz (2000–2013)
- Call sign meaning: Jackson, Wyoming

Technical information
- Licensing authority: FCC
- Facility ID: 82088
- Class: C1
- ERP: 90,000 watts
- HAAT: 315 meters (1,033 ft)
- Transmitter coordinates: 43°27′40″N 110°45′9″W
- Translator: 104.1 K281BH (Driggs, Idaho)

Links
- Public license information: Public file; LMS
- Webcast: Listen live
- Website: kjax.live

KJAX (93.5 FM, "KJAX Country 93.5") is a radio station broadcasting a country music format. Licensed to Jackson, Wyoming, United States, the station is currently owned by longtime manager Scott Anderson, through licensee Jackson Hole Radio, LLC, and features local news programming and national news from ABC News Radio.

== History ==
The station was assigned the KBHJ call letters on July 17, 1998. On May 26, 2000, the station changed its call sign to the current KJAX. The studios for the station were located at the corner of Wyoming Highway 22, and U.S. Route 89.

On January 31, 2013, KJAX moved from 93.3 FM to 93.5 FM.

== Ownership ==
Chaparral Broadcasting sold KJAX and seven other stations to Rich Broadcasting for $3.7 million; the transaction was consummated on April 1, 2013. Under Rich Broadcasting, KJAX and its sister FM stations were threatened to be shut off for a period of time due to a tower dispute with American Tower. The station was renting space on a tower, and was behind $500,000. Rich Broadcasting's issues with American Tower began to involve United States Senators Orrin Hatch of Utah, and John Barrasso of Wyoming.

A U.S. bankruptcy court judge in Utah ruled that American Tower could not turn off the radio stations unless a deal was reached.

Rich Broadcasting sold KJAX, three other stations, and four translators to Scott Anderson's Jackson Hold Radio, LLC effective March 16, 2020.

Anderson had managed the stations since 1990 and hosted on air shifts on KMTN while also covering local news.

Anderson, who also has served as the chairperson of the Jackson Hole Chamber of Commerce, was an elected Jackson, Wyoming town councilperson between 1992 and 2006.
