= KMGQ =

Radio station in Pine Bluffs, Wyoming (2001–2014)

- Pine Bluffs, Wyoming; United States
- Frequency: 105.3 MHz

Ownership
- Owner: Chisholm Trail Broadcasting LLC

History
- First air date: 2001
- Last air date: March 31, 2014
- Former call signs: KASX (1997–2001); KREO (2001–2014)

Technical information
- Facility ID: 79134
- Class: A
- ERP: 6,000 watts
- HAAT: 76 meters (249 ft)
- Transmitter coordinates: 41°17′17″N 104°0′21″W

KMGQ (105.3 FM) was a radio station broadcasting an oldies music format. Formerly licensed to Pine Bluffs, Wyoming, United States, the station was owned by Chisholm Trail Broadcasting LLC.

KMGQ's license was surrendered by its owners to the Federal Communications Commission (FCC) on March 31, 2014; the FCC cancelled the license on April 1, 2014.
