= KKTS (AM) =

- Evansville, Wyoming; United States
- Broadcast area: Casper, Wyoming
- Frequency: 1580 kHz
- Branding: Hit Radio KKTS

Programming
- Format: Hot AC
- Affiliations: Westwood One

Ownership
- Owner: Douglas Broadcasting, Inc.
- Sister stations: KKTS-FM, KKTY, KKTY-FM

History
- First air date: October 2, 2012 (as KLNQ)
- Former call signs: KLNQ (2011–2013)

Technical information
- Licensing authority: FCC
- Facility ID: 161152
- Class: B
- Power: 1,000 watts day 220 watts night
- Transmitter coordinates: 42°52′54″N 106°17′13″W
- Translator: 107.3 K297AV (Casper)
- Repeater: 99.3 MHz (KKTS-FM)

Links
- Public license information: Public file; LMS
- Website: kktsonline.com

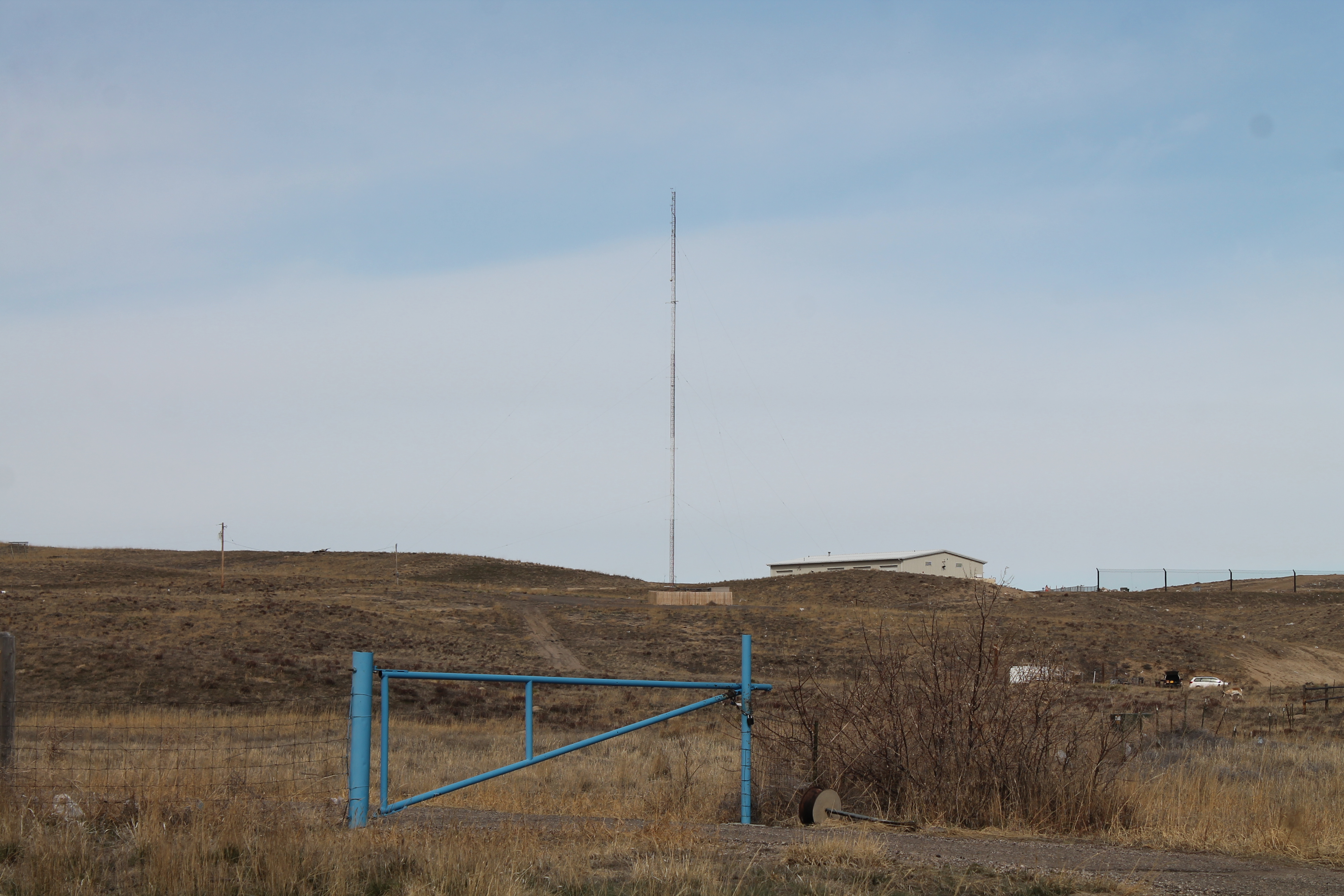
The broadcast tower for KKTS 1580 AM north of Casper.

KKTS (1580 AM) is a radio station licensed to Evansville, Wyoming, United States, and serving the Casper, Wyoming area. The station airs a Hot AC format, and is locally owned and operated by Douglas Broadcasting, Inc. HitRadio KKTS also broadcasts on KKTS-FM 99.3 FM in Douglas, Wyoming.

KKTS's license was granted on October 2, 2012. Its original call sign was KLNQ.

The station's broadcast tower is located on the north side of Casper, near the licensed city of Evansville. The transmitter site is notably situated in close proximity to the Rocky Mountain Gun Club, a local trap shooting facility in Evansville
