= KAML-FM =

United States radio station

- Gillette, Wyoming; United States
- Frequency: 97.3 MHz

Programming
- Format: Top 40
- Affiliations: Premiere Networks

Ownership
- Owner: Legend Communications of Wyoming; (Basin Radio Network)
- Sister stations: KDDV-FM, KGWY, KLED

History
- First air date: June 2, 1980; 45 years ago
- Former call signs: KOLL-FM (1980–1988)
- Call sign meaning: Camel

Technical information
- Licensing authority: FCC
- Facility ID: 24211
- Class: C0
- ERP: 100,000 watts
- HAAT: 334.7 meters
- Transmitter coordinates: 43°59′57″N 105°15′15″W

Links
- Public license information: Public file; LMS
- Webcast: Listen Live
- Website: KAML website

KAML-FM (97.3 MHz) is a radio station broadcasting a Top 40 format, licensed to Gillette, Wyoming, United States. The station is currently owned by the Basin Radio Network, a division of Legend Communications of Wyoming, LLC, and features programming from Premiere Networks.

KAML-FM and its three sister stations, KIML, KGWY, and KDDV, are located at 2810 Southern Drive, Gillette. KAML-FM and KDDV share a transmitter site south of Gillette on a tower that is the tallest man-made structure in the state.

== History ==
The station's history began when it was assigned the call sign KOLL-FM and went on the air on June 2, 1980. The call sign was officially changed to KAML-FM on December 26, 1988.

In 2024, the ownership of Legend Communications underwent a major restructuring. Co-owner Susan K. Patrick was sentenced to prison for tax fraud, which included evading taxes on millions of dollars in income. She was ordered to pay restitution exceeding $3.8 million. Following this, her ex-husband and co-founder, W. Lawrence Patrick, filed an application with the FCC to become the sole owner of Legend Communications, taking over Susan Patrick's 50% stake.
