= KFBU =

- Fox Farm, Wyoming; United States
- Broadcast area: Fox Farm, Wyoming; Cheyenne, Wyoming
- Frequency: 1630 kHz

Programming
- Format: Religious
- Network: Your Network of Praise

Ownership
- Owner: Hi-Line Radio Fellowship, Inc.

History
- First air date: November 21, 1997
- Former call signs: KKWY (1997–2005); KRND (2005–2021); KVAM (2021–2022)

Technical information
- Licensing authority: FCC
- Facility ID: 87155
- Class: B
- Power: 10,000 watts (day); 1,000 watts (night)
- Transmitter coordinates: 41°7′21.9″N 104°48′8.9″W
- Translator: 94.7 K234AH (Cheyenne)

Links
- Public license information: Public file; LMS
- Webcast: Listen live
- Website: ynop.org

KFBU (1630 AM) is a non-commercial radio station licensed to Fox Farm, Wyoming, United States, and serving the Cheyenne region. It is owned by Hi-Line Radio Fellowship, Inc. as part of Your Network of Praise (YNOP), carrying the entire network schedule.

KFBU's transmitter tower site is in the South Side Historic District, between 2nd and 3rd street and Evans and Van Lennen Avenue, sharing the lot with St. Joseph's food pantry. The station operates with a daytime power of 10,000 watts, offering local coverage to Cheyenne and Burns. The coverage is enhanced by good ground conductivity in most of the metro, and a non-noisy environment. At night, in common with most Expanded Band stations, the power decreases to 1,000 watts, which still covers Cheyenne locally, along with skywave coverage to Salt Lake City and Albuquerque.

KFBU programming is also broadcast by a translator on FM 94.7, K234AH, located 11 miles (18 km) west of Cheyenne, which broadcasts a city grade signal to the area.

== History ==
KFBU began as the "Expanded Band" twin to an existing station on the standard AM band. On March 17, 1997, the Federal Communications Commission (FCC) announced that eighty-eight stations had been given permission to move to newly available transmitting frequencies, which ranged from 1610 to 1700 kHz. This authorized then-KJJL in Cheyenne to modify its not-yet-built Construction Permit for a relocation to Fox Farm on 1530 kHz to instead change to 1630 kHz.

A construction permit for the expanded band station on 1630 kHz was assigned the call letters KKWY on November 21, 1997. The FCC's initial policy was that both the original station and its expanded band counterpart could operate simultaneously for up to five years, after which owners would have to turn in one of the two licenses, depending on whether they preferred the new assignment or elected to remain on the original frequency. However, this deadline was extended multiple times, and the originating standard AM band station, by then KJUA on 1380 kHz, was not deleted until March 18, 2019.

KKWY had a classic country format. On April 10, 2005, the call sign was changed to KRND, and the station would eventually be switched to 24/7 Spanish-language programming under La Familia Broadcasting. In 2013, an application was submitted for 1.7 kW by KRND, and effective February 19, 2020, the license was switched over from La Familia to Spanish Media Consulting Corporation, amongst numerous attempts to make antenna adjustments.

In March 2021, the station fell silent, as a result of a sale from La Familia Broadcasting to media conglomerate Cedar Cove Broadcasting, and on the 20th, the station signed on as a re-broadcaster of the KRKY-FM brand of country music and classic hits. Both KRND and its translator were involved in the sale, allowing a tri-plex of Vic Michael's stations in the Cheyenne market. On March 29, 2021, the call sign was changed to KVAM, after it was transferred from a station on 1570 AM in Loveland, Colorado. The sale by La Familia Broadcasting was consummated on May 13, 2021, at a price of $40,000.

In July 2021, after just a two and a half month run with Michael's K-rocky, the station, along with the 94.7 translator, switched affiliates to the religious Your Network of Praise, and begin broadcasting the network's programming effective immediately. The KRKY format is now limited to KFCY in Altvan, and Michael also acquired a construction-permit in Kimball. It is unknown whether Cedar Cove continues to own the property, leasing it out to YNOP, or if a sale had occurred.

On October 31, 2022, the station changed its call sign to the historically significant KFBU, which were the call letters assigned to the first Wyoming broadcasting station. The original KFBU operated from 1922 to 1929, before being transferred to the University of Wyoming in Laramie, which changed the call sign to KWYO and deleted the station later that year.

Effective February 17, 2023, Michael Radio Company sold KFBU and its translator K234AH to Hi-Line Radio Fellowship, Inc., the operator of YNOP, for $40,000.
