= KKTY (AM) =

- Douglas, Wyoming; United States
- Broadcast area: Eastern Wyoming
- Frequency: 1470 kHz
- Branding: Classics 1470

Programming
- Format: Classic hits
- Affiliations: Westwood One

Ownership
- Owner: Douglas Broadcasting, Inc.
- Sister stations: KKTY-FM, KKTS-FM, KKTS (AM)

History
- First air date: October 10, 1957
- Former call signs: KWOG (1992–1992)

Technical information
- Licensing authority: FCC
- Facility ID: 38387
- Class: B
- Power: 1,000 watts (day); 500 watts (night)
- Transmitter coordinates: 42°45′48″N 105°23′32″W
- Translator: 93.3 K227BU (Douglas)

Links
- Public license information: Public file; LMS
- Webcast: Listen live
- Website: kktyonline.com

KKTY (1470 AM) is a radio station broadcasting a classic hits format. Licensed to Douglas, Wyoming, United States. The station is owned by Douglas Broadcasting, Inc., and its programming is simulcast on an FM translator at 93.3 MHz. KKTY serves Douglas, and Converse County, Niobrara County, and parts of Eastern Wyoming.

KKTY is branded as "Classic Hits 93.3 FM / AM 1470" and primarily airs music from the late 1960s through the early 1980s.

KKTY broadcasts Douglas Bearcats High School games (basketball/football), University of Wyoming Cowboys football and Cowboys and Cowgirls basketball, Denver Broncos football and Colorado Rockies baseball.

== History ==
The station first signed on in June 1957 with the call sign KWIV. It originally operated as a 250-watt daytimer on 1050 kHz. In the 1970s, KWIV moved from 1050 to 1470, allowing Casper's KTWO to move from 1470 to 1030. The move to 1470 allowed KWIV to raise its daytime power to 1,000 watts, and for the first time, broadcast at night with 500 watts.

The station has held the KKTY call sign twice, sandwiching a brief change to KWOG in 1992.

In 1995, the station was purchased by Dennis Switzer under the entity Douglas Broadcasting, Inc. Switzer, a veteran broadcaster who began his career in Sheridan, Wyoming.
