= KQOL (FM) =

- Sleepy Hollow, Wyoming; United States
- Broadcast area: Gillette, Wyoming
- Frequency: 105.3 MHz
- Branding: Kool 105.3

Programming
- Format: Classic hits

Ownership
- Owner: Keyhole Broadcasting, LLC
- Sister stations: KXXL, KGCC

History
- First air date: 2009

Technical information
- Licensing authority: FCC
- Facility ID: 166086
- Class: C1
- ERP: 51,000 watts
- HAAT: 114 meters (374 ft)
- Transmitter coordinates: 44°17′33″N 105°26′10″W

Links
- Public license information: Public file; LMS

KQOL (105.3 FM, "Kool 105.3") is a radio station broadcasting a classic hits format. Licensed to Sleepy Hollow, Wyoming, United States, the station is currently owned by Keyhole Broadcasting, LLC. It is owned by Keyhole Broadcasting, LLC, and began broadcasting in 2009. KQOL operates as part of a three-station cluster serving the market, which includes sister stations KGCC (99.9 FM) and KXXL (106.1 FM).

KQOL joined the Keyhole cluster in early 2009, after being sold as a construction permit by Robert Rule. Rule owned TV stations in Cheyenne and Laramie at the time.

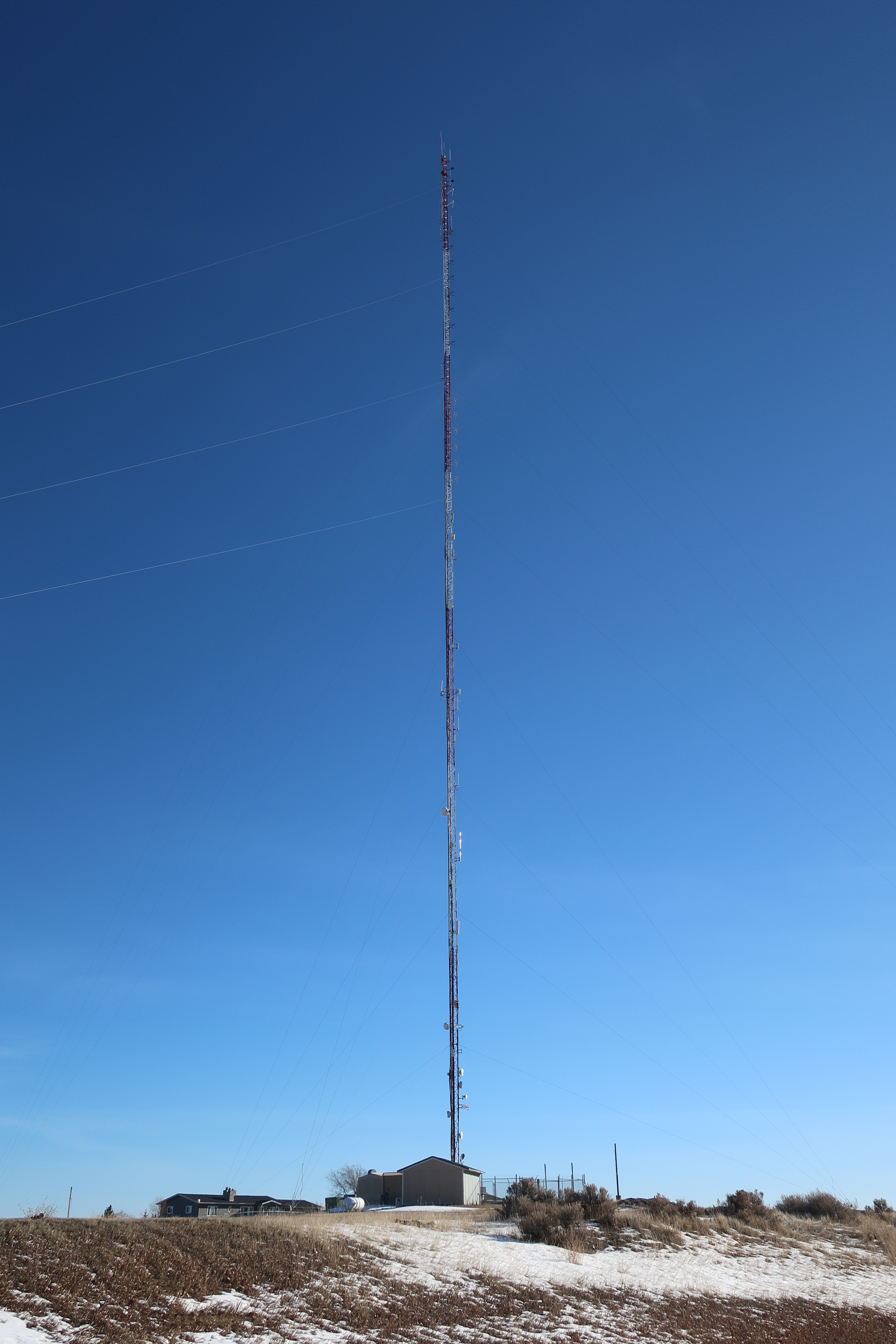
Transmitter used by KQOL located at 44°17′33″N 105°26′10″W in Gillette, Wyoming. The station's sister station KGCC also broadcasts from this tower.
