= Pilgrim Radio =

Christian radio network in Nevada, Wyoming, Montana, and California

- Type: Radio network
- Country: United States
- Broadcast area: Nevada, Wyoming, Montana, California
- Headquarters: Carson City, Nevada
- Branding: Pilgrim Radio

Ownership
- Owner: Western Inspirational Broadcasters, Inc.

Links
- Webcast: Listen live
- Website: www.pilgrimradio.com

Pilgrim Radio is a network of radio stations broadcasting a Christian radio format. Pilgrim Radio's programming includes interviews with Christian leaders, discussion of current events/issues, news, a book-reading program, and teaching messages, along with Christian contemporary music. Pilgrim Radio is listener-supported and commercial-free.

The network is owned and operated by Western Inspirational Broadcasters, Inc., a 501(c)3 tax-exempt non-profit organization.

== History ==
Western Inspirational Broadcasters was incorporated in 1962 to construct a new religious radio station. In 1969, land was acquired on McClelland Peak near Virginia City, Nevada, for the construction of a tower. KNIS—"Nevada's Inspirational Station"—made its first broadcast on 94.7 MHz on November 25, 1970. The original studios were in a trailer.

In 1988, Western Inspirational obtained a construction permit for the non-commercial 91.3 MHz frequency in Carson City. It sold the existing 94.7 facility, which could be converted to commercial authorization, to Sapphire Broadcasting of Washington, D.C., The KNIS call letters moved to 91.3 when the frequency change occurred in October 1989; the 94.7 frequency returned as a commercial station, KRWR, in June 1990. (Note: This frequency is no longer in the Reno market. In 1990, its new owner filed to move it into Sacramento, California, a process completed on January 1, 1998.)

After previously growing with the installation of translators, the network added a new high-power station with KCSP-FM 106.9 in Casper, Wyoming, in 1990. Like in Carson City, Western Inspirational sold the commercial station and moved to a non-commercial frequency at 90.3 MHz in order to feed more translators.

== Stations ==
In addition to streaming its programming at pilgrimradio.com, the signal is broadcast over-the-air on KNIS in Carson City, Nevada; KNVQ in Elko, Nevada; KDOX in Big Pine, California; KCSP-FM in Casper, Wyoming; KDNR in Cheyenne, Wyoming; KTME in Reliance, Wyoming; KPMD in Evanston, Wyoming; KMJB in Lander–Riverton, Wyoming; and KLMT in Billings, Montana. Its signal is also extended by a network of 28 FM translators in Nevada, California, and Wyoming.

Full-power stations
Call sign	Frequency	City of license	State	First air date	Facility ID	Class	ERP (W)	Height (m (ft))	Transmitter coordinates	FCC info
KDOX	91.3 FM	Big Pine	California	2012	173521	B	660 V 165 H	925.7 m (3,037 ft)	37°24′41.7″N 118°11′10.3″W	FCC (KDOX)
KLMT	89.3 FM	Billings	Montana	December 18, 2002	89849	A	980 V 350 H	161 m (528 ft)	45°45′49.3″N 108°27′20.4″W	FCC (KLMT)
KNIS (Note: Flagship station)	91.3 FM	Carson City	Nevada	October 15, 1989	71818	C0	67,000	660 m (2,170 ft)	39°15′30.9″N 119°42′37.1″W	FCC (KNIS)
KNVQ	90.7 FM	Spring Creek	Nevada	2010	173285	A	500	287 m (942 ft)	40°48′47.4″N 115°41′59.6″W	FCC (KNVQ)
KCSP-FM	90.3 FM	Casper	Wyoming	1992	71810	C	100,000	593 m (1,946 ft)	42°44′25.9″N 106°18′26″W	FCC (KCSP-FM)
KPMD (Note: Previously KCWW and rebroadcast KPCW of Park City, Utah.)	91.9 FM	Evanston	Wyoming	2005	94097	A	215	457 m (1,499 ft)	41°21′9.8″N 110°54′31.6″W	FCC (KPMD)
KMJB	89.1 FM	Hudson	Wyoming	2011	173291	C2	3,000	406 m (1,332 ft)	42°34′41.8″N 108°42′48.4″W	FCC (KMJB)
KTME	89.5 FM	Reliance	Wyoming	2010	176985	A	350	342.4 m (1,123 ft)	41°29′46.9″N 109°20′43.9″W	FCC (KTME)
KDNR	88.7 FM	South Greeley	Wyoming	December 23, 2003	84104	A	500	129 m (423 ft)	41°6′2″N 105°1′30″W	FCC (KDNR)

Notes:

Call sign	Frequency	City of license	FID	ERP (W)	HAAT	Class	Transmitter coordinates	FCC info
K259CE	89.9 FM	Chester, California	71809	10	751.1 m (2,464 ft)	D	40°14′20.6″N 121°1′58.2″W	LMS
K210BC	89.9 FM	Johnstonville, California	71805	98	697 m (2,287 ft)	D	40°26′48.6″N 120°21′28.7″W	LMS
K220CO	91.9 FM	South Lake Tahoe, California	71797	149	28.4 m (93 ft)	D	38°54′36.8″N 120°2′9.1″W	LMS
K209AU	89.7 FM	Portola, California	71825	8	596 m (1,955 ft)	D	39°46′8.6″N 120°26′11.7″W	LMS
K213BF	90.5 FM	Quincy, California	71821	74	−199 m (−653 ft)	D	39°56′24.6″N 120°55′41.8″W	LMS
K211FG	90.1 FM	Battle Mountain, Nevada	71822	94	679.8 m (2,230 ft)	D	40°37′16.6″N 116°41′19.3″W	LMS
K220DT	91.9 FM	Ely, Nevada	71826	11	258 m (846 ft)	D	39°15′52.8″N 114°53′37.1″W	LMS
K208BR	89.5 FM	Eureka, Nevada	71801	50	−77.9 m (−256 ft)	D	39°30′40″N 115°57′55.9″W	LMS
K214FA	90.7 FM	Hawthorne, Nevada	71812	40	980.5 m (3,217 ft)	D	38°27′24.6″N 118°45′52.1″W	LMS
K266AO	101.1 FM	Lovelock, Nevada	71804	73	635.9 m (2,086 ft)	D	40°7′4.6″N 118°43′42.5″W	LMS
K219BT	91.7 FM	Orovada, Nevada	50707	462	185 m (607 ft)	D	41°38′58.6″N 117°43′17.4″W	LMS
K214EV	90.7 FM	Winnemucca, Nevada	71824	17	561.8 m (1,843 ft)	D	41°0′38.5″N 117°46′3″W	LMS
K246CZ	97.1 FM	Big Piney, Wyoming	141766	10	0 m (0 ft)	D	42°19′29.5″N 110°19′11.8″W	LMS
K269DE	101.7 FM	Buffalo, Wyoming	71831	10	0 m (0 ft)	D	44°20′28″N 106°48′25″W	LMS
K236BN	95.1 FM	Cody, Wyoming	71807	10	0 m (0 ft)	D	44°29′45.8″N 109°9′11.5″W	LMS
K210EL	89.9 FM	Diamondville, Wyoming	122019	23	270.1 m (886 ft)	D	41°50′12.8″N 110°30′7.6″W	LMS
K237FD	95.3 FM	Evanston, Wyoming	122019	11	472.2 m (1,549 ft)	D	41°21′12″N 110°54′31.6″W	LMS
K232CT	94.3 FM	Gillette, Wyoming	71830	14	133 m (436 ft)	D	44°12′33.9″N 105°28′3.9″W	LMS
K244DP	96.7 FM	Lander, Wyoming	71820	135	134 m (440 ft)	D	42°54′23.8″N 108°42′21.4″W	LMS
K201HM	88.1 FM	Laramie, Wyoming	12349	135	134 m (440 ft)	D	41°18′27.8″N 105°32′35.6″W	LMS
K226BN	93.1 FM	Lyman, Wyoming	71837	135	134 m (440 ft)	D	41°6′22.8″N 110°12′32.5″W	LMS
K257DP	99.3 FM	Pinedale, Wyoming	71838	14	137 m (449 ft)	D	42°50′38.7″N 109°55′31.5″W	LMS
K245BH	96.9 FM	Powell, Wyoming	71803	250	763.8 m (2,506 ft)	D	44°48′57.8″N 107°54′14.3″W	LMS
K269EG	101.7 FM	Rawlins, Wyoming	71827	207	46 m (151 ft)	D	41°46′14.8″N 107°14′19.1″W	LMS
K273BY	102.5 FM	Riverton, Wyoming	71802	115	79.7 m (261 ft)	D	43°2′37″N 108°26′25.3″W	LMS
K257EO	99.3 FM	Sheridan, Wyoming	71799	200	−26.7 m (−88 ft)	D	44°47′45.8″N 106°56′26.2″W	LMS
K208GF	89.9 FM	Thermopolis, Wyoming	71819	250	0 m (0 ft)	D	43°39′6.5″N 108°15′9.3″W	LMS
K219KZ	91.7 FM	Worland, Wyoming	71813	170	126 m (413 ft)	D	43°3′55.8″N 107°51′54.3″W	LMS
K208BS	89.6 FM	Bishop, California	71806	26	899 m (2,949 ft)	D	37°24′42″N 118°11′10″W	LMS
