= KKTY-FM =

- Glendo, Wyoming; United States
- Broadcast area: Douglas, Casper, Wheatland, Lusk & East-Central Wyoming
- Frequency: 100.1 MHz

Programming
- Format: Country
- Affiliations: CBS News Radio; Westwood One

Ownership
- Owner: Douglas Broadcasting, Inc
- Sister stations: KKTY (AM), KKTS-FM, KKTS (AM)

History
- First air date: August 21, 1998
- Former call signs: KUUY (1998–1999); KYOD (1999–2011)

Technical information
- Licensing authority: FCC
- Facility ID: 88501
- Class: C1
- ERP: 100,000 watts
- HAAT: 139.0 meters (456.0 ft)
- Transmitter coordinates: 42°46′13″N 105°13′21″W

Links
- Public license information: Public file; LMS
- Webcast: Listen live
- Website: kktyonline.com

KKTY-FM (100.1 FM) is a radio station broadcasting a Country format. Licensed to Glendo, Wyoming, United States, the station is locally owned and operated by Douglas Broadcasting, Inc. and features programming from CBS News Radio and Westwood One. In addition to country music and national and international news from CBS, KKTY-FM features news and sports from the Cowboy State News Network, weather from Don Day's DayWeather, and local news updates hourly. Ag news comes from the Northern Ag Network, and Bob Kingsley counts down the Country Top 40 Sunday afternoons at 1pm.

== History ==
The 100.1 MHz license signed on the air on August 21, 1998, under the original call sign KUUY.

The KKTY-FM call sign was previously held by the 99.3 MHz license in Douglas, which is now KKTS-FM.

== Fictional counterpart station ==
KKTY was also the call letters Bayside High School's radio station on the comedy series Saved by the Bell episode "Save the Max." That station had frequency 98.6 FM with the slogan Tiger Beat. In the episode, characters discover old equipment in a studio and restart the station. They use the airwaves to promote their favorite restaurant to prevent its closure.
