= KKAW =

- Albin, Wyoming; United States
- Frequency: 107.3 MHz

Programming
- Format: Defunct

Ownership
- Owner: Victor A. Michael, Jr.; (Laramie Mountain Broadcasting, LLC)

History
- First air date: 1998-06-26
- Former call signs: KKAW (1998–2013); KKWY (2013–2014)

Technical information
- Licensing authority: FCC
- Facility ID: 83584
- Class: C3
- ERP: 9,300 watts
- HAAT: 162 meters
- Transmitter coordinates: 41°29′31″N 104°5′7″W

Links
- Public license information: Public file; LMS

KKAW (107.3 FM) was a radio station licensed to Albin, Wyoming, United States. The station was owned by Victor A. Michael Jr., through licensee Laramie Mountain Broadcasting, LLC.

== History ==
The station went on the air as KKAW on 1998-06-26.

On February 19, 2008, KKAW changed its format from country to oldies, simulcasting KRRR 104.9 FM Cheyenne, Wyoming. It changed its format back to country in 2012. On June 13, 2013, KKAW went silent. The station changed its call sign to KKWY on July 15, 2013, and back to the current KKAW on February 24, 2014.

On August 27, 2014, the station's owners notified the Federal Communications Commission that KKAW had been silent for more than twelve months, and requested cancellation of KKAW's license.
