= KKWY (Colorado) =

Radio station in Estes Park, Colorado (2012–2016)

- Estes Park, Colorado; United States
- Frequency: 88.7 MHz

Ownership
- Owner: Cedar Cove Broadcasting, Inc.

History
- First air date: 2010
- Last air date: 2016
- Former call signs: KFCY (2010–2012); KHIH (2012–2015); KDCO (2015); KRKY-FM (2015); KKWY (2015–2016)

Technical information
- Facility ID: 173750
- Class: A
- ERP: 100 watts
- HAAT: −49 meters (−161 ft)
- Transmitter coordinates: 40°21′44″N 105°31′4″W

KKWY (88.7 FM) was a radio station licensed to Estes Park, Colorado, United States. The station was owned by Cedar Cove Broadcasting, Inc.

Cedar Cove Broadcasting surrendered the station's license to the Federal Communications Commission (FCC) on April 7, 2016; the FCC cancelled KKWY's license on April 12, 2016.
