= KAIX =

- Casper, Wyoming; United States
- Frequency: 88.3 MHz
- Branding: Air1

Programming
- Format: Christian worship music
- Network: Air1

Ownership
- Owner: Educational Media Foundation

History
- First air date: 2008
- Former call signs: KKRR (2008–2019); KEZF (2019–2020)

Technical information
- Licensing authority: FCC
- Facility ID: 92997
- Class: C3
- ERP: 500 watts (vert.)
- HAAT: 526 meters (1,726 ft)
- Transmitter coordinates: 42°44′26″N 106°21′34″W

Links
- Public license information: Public file; LMS

KAIX (88.3 FM) is a non-commercial radio station licensed to Casper, Wyoming, United States. The station is owned by the Educational Media Foundation and airs its Air1 Christian worship music network.

The station broadcast an oldies music format until August 12, 2010. Subsequently, operating a religious format, the station was taken silent on November 8, 2019, and sold to the Educational Media Foundation.

== History ==
This station received its original construction permit from the Federal Communications Commission on August 22, 2005. The new station was assigned call letters KKRR by the FCC on September 9, 2008. KKRR received its license to cover from the FCC on August 27, 2008.

Cedar Cove Broadcasting acquired KKRR's license from original licensee WCN, Inc. effective September 11, 2019, at a purchase price of $50,000. The station changed its call sign to KEZF on October 5, 2019, and then to KAIX on February 8, 2020. Cedar Cove then traded the station to EMF in exchange for translator K214DI (90.7 FM), which had been Air1's transmitter in Casper, and $50,000. The exchange was consummated on May 11, 2020.
