= KKTS-FM =

- Douglas, Wyoming; United States
- Frequency: 99.3 MHz

Programming
- Format: Hot adult contemporary
- Affiliations: Westwood One

Ownership
- Owner: Douglas Broadcasting, Inc.
- Sister stations: KKTY, KKTY-FM, KKTS-AM

History
- First air date: May 1, 1992
- Former call signs: KKTY-FM (1992, CP); KWOG-FM (1992–1993, CP); KKTY-FM (1993–2011)

Technical information
- Licensing authority: FCC
- Facility ID: 17411
- Class: A
- ERP: 2,350 watts
- HAAT: 162 meters (531 ft)
- Transmitter coordinates: 42°43′42″N 105°31′46″W
- Repeaters: 1580 KKTS (Evansville); 107.3 K297AV (Casper)

Links
- Public license information: Public file; LMS
- Webcast: Listen live
- Website: kktsonline.com

KKTS-FM (99.3 FM) is a radio station broadcasting a Hot Adult Contemporary format. Licensed to Douglas, Wyoming, United States, the station is locally owned and operated by Douglas Broadcasting and features programming from Westwood One. HitRadio KKTS also broadcasts on KKTS-AM 1580 and 107.3FM in Casper, Wyoming.

== History ==
The station first signed on the air in May 1992 on its current frequency of 99.3 FM. On September 1, 1992, the station changed its call sign to KWOG-FM. On December 2, 1993, it changed again to KKTY-FM, and on May 2, 2011, to the current KKTS-FM. The KKTS format expanded its service to the larger Casper, Wyoming, market starting in 2013. This coverage is accomplished via an affiliated AM station at 1580 kHz and an FM translator at 107.3 MHz.
