= KLMI =

- Rock River, Wyoming; United States
- Broadcast area: Laramie, Wyoming
- Frequency: 106.1 MHz
- Branding: Hits 106

Programming
- Format: Adult hits
- Affiliations: ABC News Radio; Compass Media Networks

Ownership
- Owner: Shawn Faxon; (Wolf Creek Radio Broadcasting, LLC)

History
- First air date: May 19, 2011; 14 years ago
- Former call signs: KVAN (March–October 2005); KKHI (2005–2008)

Technical information
- Licensing authority: FCC
- Facility ID: 164207
- Class: C2
- ERP: 50,000 watts
- HAAT: 52 meters
- Transmitter coordinates: 41°29′5″N 106°3′6″W

Links
- Public license information: Public file; LMS
- Webcast: Listen live
- Website: myhits106.com

KLMI (106.1 FM, "Hits 106") is a radio station licensed to Rock River, Wyoming. It carries a broad adult hits mix from the last forty years. The station was leased by Townsquare Media when it went silent in 2010 due to the recession and decreased revenue. Shawn Faxon's Wolf Creek Radio Broadcasting, LLC resurrected the Hits 106 brand, turning it into a mix of pop, rock and country music titles from the 1970s to the present. The station serves Laramie and Albany County and is locally programmed. Its transmitter is located west of Laramie near Interstate 80. The station also has an on-channel booster, broadcasting from east of Laramie.

KLMI changed frequencies from 106.5 to 106.1 on September 8, 2009.

== History ==
The station was assigned the call letters KVAN on May 2, 2005. On October 13, 2005, the station changed its call sign to KKHI and then on January 31, 2008, to the current KLMI.
