= KDJY =

Radio station in Douglas, Wyoming

- Douglas, Wyoming; United States
- Frequency: 88.7 MHz
- Branding: Your Network of Praise

Programming
- Format: Christian
- Network: Your Network of Praise

Ownership
- Owner: Hi-Line Radio Fellowship

History
- Former call signs: KKWY (2008–2013); KKAW (2013–2014); KRKY-FM (2015–2024)

Technical information
- Licensing authority: FCC
- Facility ID: 176144
- Class: C3
- ERP: 23,000 watts
- HAAT: 73 meters (240 ft)
- Transmitter coordinates: 42°51′29″N 105°14′3″W

Links
- Public license information: Public file; LMS
- Webcast: Listen live
- Website: ynop.org

KDJY (88.7 FM) is a noncommercial radio station licensed to Douglas, Wyoming, United States. The station is owned by Hi-Line Radio Fellowship and airs a Christian format as an affiliate of Your Network of Praise.

== History ==
In 2008, the Federal Communications Commission granted Wren Communications a construction permit for a station on 88.7 MHz in Douglas. KKWY went on the air in 2011 and then went silent in October, citing the unreliability of its internet programming feed. After emerging in June 2012, the main transmitter failed that August, leaving the station dark again for 11 months. In July 2013, the station returned to the air as KKAW.

In January 2014, KKAW asked to go silent yet again for another main transmitter failure. While silent, the station reverted to the KKWY call letters in February. Wren sold the station to Cedar Cove for $2,000. KKWY returned to the air in January 2015 and became KRKY-FM in December, the fourth station in 2015 alone to hold the call letters (the other three are now KVXO and the defunct KKHG and KKWY (Colorado)). After at first reducing KRKY-FM's power to 850 watts, in 2019, Michael raised it to 23,000 watts on a new frequency, 88.1 MHz. In 2024, the station was sold to Hi-Line Radio Fellowship, along with two construction permits, for $50,000.
