= KCWB (FM) =

- Byron, Wyoming; United States
- Broadcast area: Big Horn Basin
- Frequency: 92.1 MHz

Programming
- Format: Classic Country

Ownership
- Owner: Legend Communications of Wyoming, Inc.; (Big Horn Radio Network)
- Sister stations: KZMQ-FM, KTAG, KCGL, KODI, KZMQ, KWOR, KVGL, KKLX

History
- First air date: June 2014
- Call sign meaning: "Cowboy"

Technical information
- Licensing authority: FCC
- Facility ID: 190415
- Class: C
- ERP: 100,000 watts
- HAAT: 574 metres (1,883 ft)
- Transmitter coordinates: 44°29′52″N 109°09′12″W

Links
- Public license information: Public file; LMS
- Website: Official website

KCWB (92.1 FM) is a radio station broadcasting a classic country music format. It is licensed to Byron, Wyoming. The station is currently owned by the Big Horn Radio Network, a division of Legend Communications of Wyoming, LLC.

All Big Horn Radio Network stations have their offices and studios located at 1949 Mountain View Drive in Cody. KCWB, KCGL and KTAG all share a transmitter site on Cedar Mountain off Highway 14, west of Cody.

The station signed on in June 2014. The station was established during a period of expansion for Legend Communications in the state, which is one of Wyoming's largest media ownership groups, operating more than 20 radio stations across several cities.

The station's owner, Legend Communications, has since been the subject of regional media coverage regarding ownership changes and legal issues related to the company's principals, Larry and Susan Patrick, which occurred in the years following KCWB's launch.
