= KYDZ =

Radio station in Cody, Wyoming (1976–1996)

- Cody, Wyoming; United States
- Frequency: 90.1 MHz
- Branding: Kids 90

Programming
- Format: High school radio

Ownership
- Owner: Cody High School; (Park County School District Number 6)

History
- First air date: 1976
- Last air date: 1996
- Call sign meaning: Similar to "KIDS"

Technical information
- Facility ID: 51604
- Class: C2
- ERP: 10,000 watts
- HAAT: −140 m
- Transmitter coordinates: 44°31′29″N 109°4′6″W

KYDZ "Kids 90" was a high school radio station at Cody High School in Cody, Wyoming. The station's license was held by Park County School District Number 6, and it operated on 90.1 MHz from 1976 to 1996.

== History ==
After being granted a construction permit in January 1975, KYDZ signed on the air in the summer of 1976. Broadcasting with 10 watts, KYDZ was the first FM radio station to sign on the air in the Bighorn Basin; the first commercial FM outlet in the region was KENB-FM, which took to the air in December 1980. Like many high school stations, KYDZ operated during the day only; in 1984, its regular broadcast hours were 8:30 a.m. to 5 p.m. Programming was eclectic, with pop and rock music, public service announcements, news of school activities, and story programs for elementary school and preschool students. The station was relocated to a new transmitter site in 1981, with its effective radiated power increased to 150 watts; a second increase approved in 1986 boosted KYDZ's power to 10,000 watts.

In 1976, the station planned on organizing a 77-hour radio marathon in late December to help the students gain work experience. However, the marathon took on a life of its own when Rob Russell, a football player who had been key in leading Cody to a state football title that fall and a member of the radio class, came down with a staph infection and was flown to the Mayo Clinic in Rochester, Minnesota. The students turned the marathon into a benefit to raise money for his medical treatment, raising more than $1,200. The KYDZ radiothon soon became an annual tradition, raising money for local causes such as a local Meals on Wheels program. The 84-hour 1984 edition raised $3,417 for an 8-year-old Cody boy who had been accidentally shot months prior and sent messages to Marines stationed in Lebanon; their efforts earned them a thank-you letter from President Ronald Reagan. The next year, the radiothon raised funds for a football player from Rock Springs High School who collapsed on the field during a football practice and was in a coma for four weeks.

In 1996, however, KYDZ's broadcast time on air would come to an end when the school district could not afford to hire a faculty advisor to run the radio program. The license was cancelled in 1998 for failure to transmit over a 12-month period. The channel is now used by Wyoming Public Radio transmitter KUWP (licensed to Powell).
