= KWOR =

- Worland, Wyoming; United States
- Frequency: 1340 kHz
- Branding: AM 1340 K-WOR

Programming
- Format: Talk
- Affiliations: FOX News Radio, Citadel Media, Premiere Radio Networks, Westwood One

Ownership
- Owner: Legend Communications of Wyoming, LLC; (Big Horn Radio Network)
- Sister stations: KKLX, KVGL, KZMQ-FM, KZMQ (AM), KTAG, KCGL, KODI

History
- First air date: 1946

Technical information
- Licensing authority: FCC
- Facility ID: 35897
- Class: C
- Power: 1,000 watts unlimited
- Transmitter coordinates: 44°1′2″N 107°58′14″W
- Translator: K284CJ 104.7 (Worland)

Links
- Public license information: Public file; LMS
- Website: www.mybighornbasin.com

KWOR (1340 AM) is a radio station broadcasting a talk radio format. It is licensed to Worland, Wyoming, United States. The station is currently owned by the Big Horn Radio Network, a division of Legend Communications of Wyoming, LLC, and features programming from FOX News Radio, Westwood One and CBS Radio.

KWOR, KKLX and KVGL studios are located at 1340 Radio Drive, Worland. The KWOR transmitter and tower are at the studios.

== History ==
KWOR first signed on the air in 1946. By the early 1950s, the station was an affiliate of the American Broadcasting Company (ABC) network. It was also a key member of the regional Wyoming Cowboy Network, a group of stations organized to provide comprehensive news coverage across the state. The station programs a talk radio format. The station is owned by Legend Communications of Wyoming, LLC. It also operates an FM translator on 104.7 MHz.

During the 1970s their format was a blend of country/western and soft rock. KWOR was an ABC News and Intermountain Radio Network (IMN) affiliate.

For many years, KWOR was paired with a local FM station. The station that currently broadcasts on 98.3 FM in Worland, known as KKLX-FM ("Kix 98.3"), operated as KWOR's sister station for decades.

The FM counterpart operated under the call sign KWOR-FM from 1987 to 1989. It also previously broadcast a Country music format and was branded as "The Big Country" during the 1990s.

=== Legend Communications ===
The station is part of a larger group of Wyoming radio stations collectively branded as the Big Horn Radio Network, which is operated by Legend Communications of Wyoming, LLC. Legend Communications acquired KWOR and its sister station KKLX-FM in a single transaction in 2007 from their previous owner, KWOR Inc.

Legend Communications of Wyoming is one of the largest chains of radio stations in the state, operating over 20 stations and three FM translators across Wyoming communities including Cody, Worland, Sheridan, Buffalo, and Gillette. The group operates under three primary regional brands: the Big Horn Radio Network, the Big Horn Mountain Radio Network, and the Basin Radio Network.

The company was co-founded by W. Lawrence Patrick and Susan K. Patrick. In 2024, an FCC filing was made to transfer Susan Patrick's 50% stake in Legend Communications to Larry Patrick, making him the sole equity holder of the company.
