= Powell, Wyoming =

City in Park County, Wyoming, United States

- City
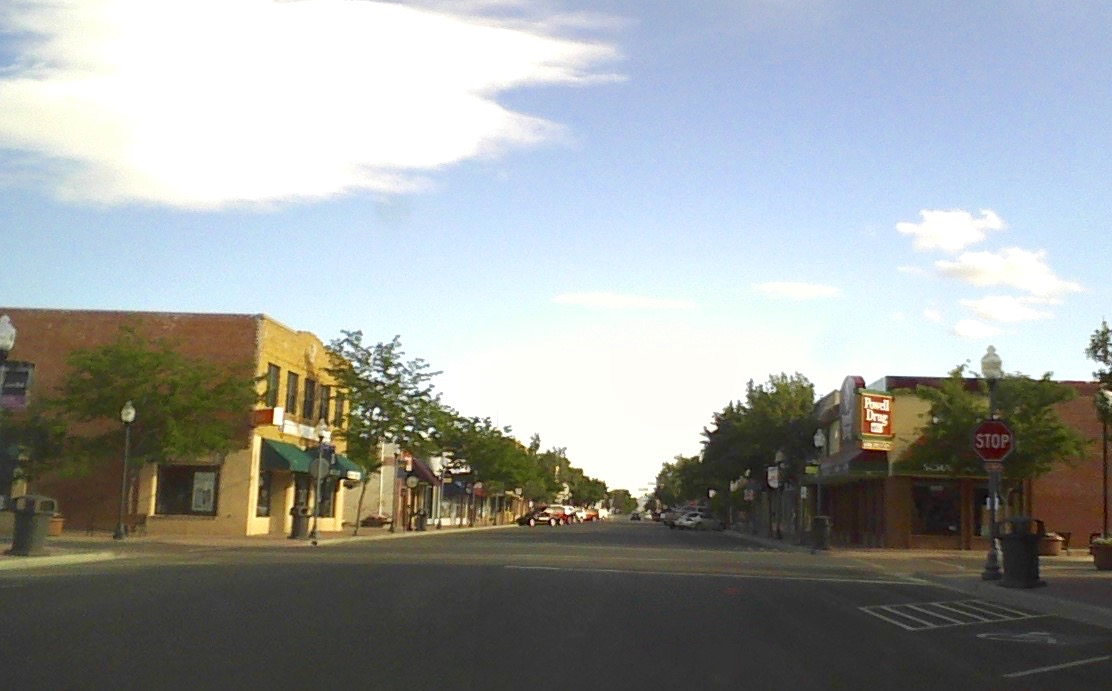
- Downtown Powell, Wyoming, July 2015

- Flag

- Location of Powell in Park County, Wyoming.
- Coordinates: 44°45′32″N 108°45′30″W
- Country: United States
- State: Wyoming
- County: Park

Area
  - Total: 4.29 sq mi (11.11 km^{2})
  - Land: 4.29 sq mi (11.11 km^{2})
  - Water: 0 sq mi (0.00 km^{2})
- Elevation: 4,393 ft (1,339 m)

Population (2020)
  - Total: 6,419
  - Density: 1,440.7/sq mi (556.27/km^{2})
- Time zone: UTC−7 (Mountain (MST))
  - Summer (DST): UTC−6 (MDT)
- ZIP code: 82435
- Area code: 307
- FIPS code: 56-62450
- GNIS feature ID: 2411481
- Website: www.cityofpowell.com

Powell (/pæl/) is a city in Park County, Wyoming, United States. The population was 6,419 at the 2020 census. Powell is an All-America City and home to Northwest College.

== History ==
Powell was incorporated in 1909. Powell was named for John Wesley Powell, U.S. soldier, geologist and explorer. Powell post office was established January 23, 1908.

In 2013, the area was the subject of a piece of national legislation. The Powell Shooting Range Land Conveyance Act (S. 130; 113th Congress), which was passed by both the United States Senate and the United States House of Representatives, would transfer a piece of land from the Bureau of Land Management to the Powell Recreation District for continued use as a shooting range.

== Geography ==
According to the United States Census Bureau, the city has a total area of 4.25 square miles (11.01 km^{2}), all land.

=== Climate ===
According to the Köppen Climate Classification system, Powell has a cold desert climate, abbreviated "BWk" on climate maps. The hottest temperature recorded in Powell was 104 °F (40 °C) on June 10, 1988, and July 16, 2002, while the coldest temperature recorded was −34 °F (−37 °C) on December 22, 1990.

Climate data for Powell, Wyoming, 1991–2020 normals, extremes 1907–present
Month	Jan	Feb	Mar	Apr	May	Jun	Jul	Aug	Sep	Oct	Nov	Dec	Year
Record high °F (°C)	64 (18)	69 (21)	78 (26)	87 (31)	95 (35)	104 (40)	104 (40)	102 (39)	98 (37)	88 (31)	76 (24)	69 (21)	104 (40)
Mean maximum °F (°C)	52.4 (11.3)	55.5 (13.1)	68.5 (20.3)	78.5 (25.8)	84.8 (29.3)	92.4 (33.6)	96.5 (35.8)	95.6 (35.3)	90.9 (32.7)	79.4 (26.3)	64.4 (18.0)	54.6 (12.6)	97.5 (36.4)
Mean daily maximum °F (°C)	31.5 (−0.3)	35.9 (2.2)	48.3 (9.1)	56.9 (13.8)	65.9 (18.8)	76.0 (24.4)	85.2 (29.6)	83.7 (28.7)	73.0 (22.8)	57.6 (14.2)	43.1 (6.2)	32.6 (0.3)	57.5 (14.2)
Daily mean °F (°C)	18.8 (−7.3)	23.0 (−5.0)	33.9 (1.1)	42.6 (5.9)	52.8 (11.6)	61.6 (16.4)	68.8 (20.4)	66.7 (19.3)	56.9 (13.8)	43.4 (6.3)	30.0 (−1.1)	20.4 (−6.4)	43.2 (6.2)
Mean daily minimum °F (°C)	6.1 (−14.4)	10.1 (−12.2)	19.6 (−6.9)	28.4 (−2.0)	39.6 (4.2)	47.1 (8.4)	52.4 (11.3)	49.7 (9.8)	40.8 (4.9)	29.2 (−1.6)	17.0 (−8.3)	8.2 (−13.2)	29.0 (−1.7)
Mean minimum °F (°C)	−12.4 (−24.7)	−7.1 (−21.7)	3.4 (−15.9)	15.4 (−9.2)	26.8 (−2.9)	37.5 (3.1)	44.0 (6.7)	40.4 (4.7)	29.3 (−1.5)	14.4 (−9.8)	0.2 (−17.7)	−7.8 (−22.1)	−17.4 (−27.4)
Record low °F (°C)	−32 (−36)	−36 (−38)	−22 (−30)	−14 (−26)	14 (−10)	28 (−2)	30 (−1)	26 (−3)	12 (−11)	−5 (−21)	−21 (−29)	−34 (−37)	−36 (−38)
Average precipitation inches (mm)	0.18 (4.6)	0.18 (4.6)	0.26 (6.6)	0.57 (14)	1.22 (31)	1.33 (34)	0.77 (20)	0.42 (11)	0.76 (19)	0.70 (18)	0.21 (5.3)	0.10 (2.5)	6.70 (170)
Average snowfall inches (cm)	2.6 (6.6)	1.8 (4.6)	1.7 (4.3)	0.8 (2.0)	0.1 (0.25)	0.0 (0.0)	0.0 (0.0)	0.0 (0.0)	0.0 (0.0)	1.1 (2.8)	1.6 (4.1)	1.5 (3.8)	11.2 (28.45)
Average precipitation days (≥ 0.01 in)	3.0	2.9	3.1	5.9	8.6	8.0	5.7	4.8	5.1	4.5	3.0	2.8	57.4
Average snowy days (≥ 0.1 in)	2.3	2.4	1.1	1.0	0.2	0.0	0.0	0.0	0.0	0.9	1.5	1.5	10.9
Source 1: NOAA
Source 2: National Weather Service

== Demographics ==
Historical population
Census	Pop.	Note	%±
1920	2,463		—
1930	1,156		−53.1%
1940	1,948		68.5%
1950	3,804		95.3%
1960	4,740		24.6%
1970	4,807		1.4%
1980	5,310		10.5%
1990	5,292		−0.3%
2000	5,373		1.5%
2010	6,314		17.5%
2020	6,419		1.7%
2023 (est.)	6,488		1.1%
U.S. Decennial Census

=== 2020 census ===
As of the 2020 census, Powell had a population of 6,419. The median age was 36.1 years. 22.4% of residents were under the age of 18 and 19.8% of residents were 65 years of age or older. For every 100 females there were 93.6 males, and for every 100 females age 18 and over there were 91.4 males age 18 and over.

99.8% of residents lived in urban areas, while 0.2% lived in rural areas.

There were 2,609 households in Powell, of which 27.5% had children under the age of 18 living in them. Of all households, 43.1% were married-couple households, 19.9% were households with a male householder and no spouse or partner present, and 30.1% were households with a female householder and no spouse or partner present. About 35.1% of all households were made up of individuals and 15.7% had someone living alone who was 65 years of age or older.

There were 2,859 housing units, of which 8.7% were vacant. The homeowner vacancy rate was 1.6% and the rental vacancy rate was 11.2%.

Racial composition as of the 2020 census
Race	Number	Percent
White	5,582	87.0%
Black or African American	23	0.4%
American Indian and Alaska Native	47	0.7%
Asian	64	1.0%
Native Hawaiian and Other Pacific Islander	10	0.2%
Some other race	230	3.6%
Two or more races	463	7.2%
Hispanic or Latino (of any race)	642	10.0%

=== 2010 census ===
As of the census of 2010, there were 6,314 people, 2,463 households, and 1,449 families living in the city. The population density was 1,485.6 inhabitants per square mile (573.6/km^{2}). There were 2,627 housing units at an average density of 618.1 units per square mile (238.6 units/km^{2}). The racial makeup of the city was 93.7% White, 0.4% African American, 0.6% Native American, 1.2% Asian, 2.4% from other races, and 1.7% from two or more races. Hispanic or Latino of any race were 9.4% of the population.

There were 2,463 households, of which 28.4% had children under the age of 18 living with them, 45.5% were married couples living together, 9.4% had a female householder with no husband present, 3.9% had a male householder with no wife present, and 41.2% were non-families. 33.5% of all households were made up of individuals, and 13.7% had someone living alone who was 65 years of age or older. The average household size was 2.27 and the average family size was 2.93.

The median age in the city was 31.9 years. 21.2% of residents were under the age of 18; 19% were between the ages of 18 and 24; 22.8% were from 25 to 44; 20.3% were from 45 to 64; and 16.6% were 65 years of age or older. The gender makeup of the city was 48.5% male and 51.5% female.

=== 2000 census ===
As of the census of 2000, there were 5,373 people, 2,083 households, and 1,272 families living in the city. The population density was 1,442.3 people per square mile (556.9 people/km^{2}). There were 2,249 housing units at an average density of 603.7 units per square mile (233.1 units/km^{2}). The racial makeup of the city was 95.44% White, 0.13% African American, 0.47% Native American, 0.39% Asian, 0.04% Pacific Islander, 2.53% from other races, and 1.01% from two or more races. Hispanic or Latino of any race were 6.81% of the population.

There were 2,083 households, out of which 26.8% had children under the age of 18 living with them, 49.1% were married couples living together, 9.1% had a female householder with no husband present, and 38.9% were non-families. 31.4% of all households were made up of individuals, and 14.5% had someone living alone who was 65 years of age or older. The average household size was 2.28 and the average family size was 2.89.

In the city, the population was spread out, with 21.0% under the age of 18, 18.6% from 18 to 24, 22.4% from 25 to 44, 19.5% from 45 to 64, and 18.4% who were 65 years of age or older. The median age was 35 years. For every 100 females, there were 85.4 males. For every 100 females age 18 and over, there were 83.5 males.

The median income for a household in the city was $27,364, and the median income for a family was $34,877. Males had a median income of $36,175 versus $21,000 for females. The per capita income for the city was $14,518. About 13.5% of families and 20.3% of the population were below the poverty line, including 24.9% of those under age 18 and 4.8% of those age 65 or over.

== Economy ==
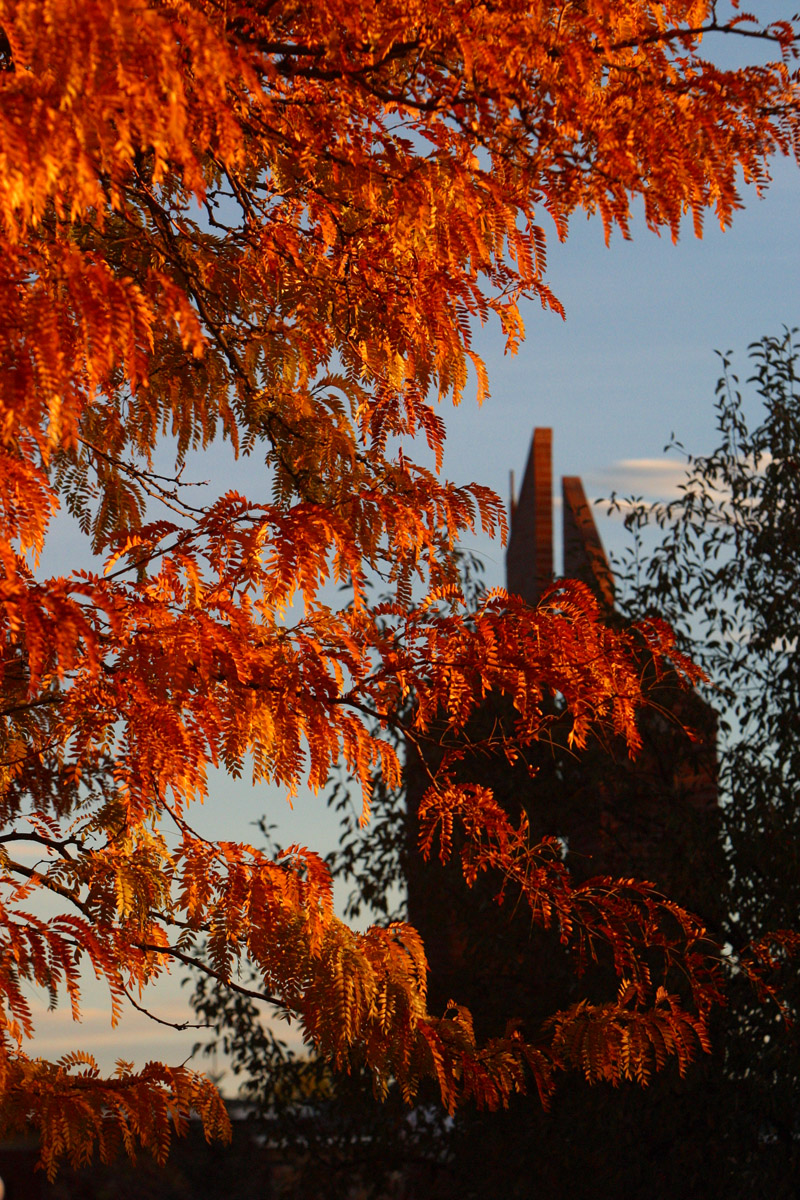
Carillon with fall foliage, October 2003

Powell was originally established as a cattle ranching community. Oil reserves were found in the late-19th century, prompting the CB&Q Railroad (later BNSF), to extend a line into Powell. In the early 20th century, the Homestead Acts and the Shoshone Project contributed greatly to agricultural development in the Bighorn Basin. Mineral extraction and agriculture are still the key industries of Powell, with sugar beets, barley, and pinto beans being the most commonly grown cash crops. Beef production remains an important facet of the Powell economy, as well. When the local department store in Powell closed, the community raised $400,000 and established the Powell Mercantile, a community-owned store.

== Government ==
Powell has a Mayor-Council form of government with a City Administrator. The mayor and council are non-partisan and elected to four-year terms. The Administrator is appointed by the mayor-council.

There are two council members for each of the three wards. Elections are held in even years for three council members.

Mayor John F. Wetzel's term expires in 2028. He first became mayor in 2017 following the death of Don Hillman. He ran for election in 2018 to fill the remainder of Hillman's term. He then ran for re-election in 2020 and 2024.

== Education ==
Powell has a public library, a branch of the Park County Library System.

Public K–12 education is administered by Park County School District No. 1, and includes 4 K–5 elementary schools (one of which is located in Clark, WY), Powell Middle School, Powell High School, and the Shoshone Learning Center, an alternative high school. Northwest College, a public two-year residential college, is located in the Northern portion of Powell. Several 4-year degrees are available at Northwest through the University of Wyoming's extended campus.

== Media ==
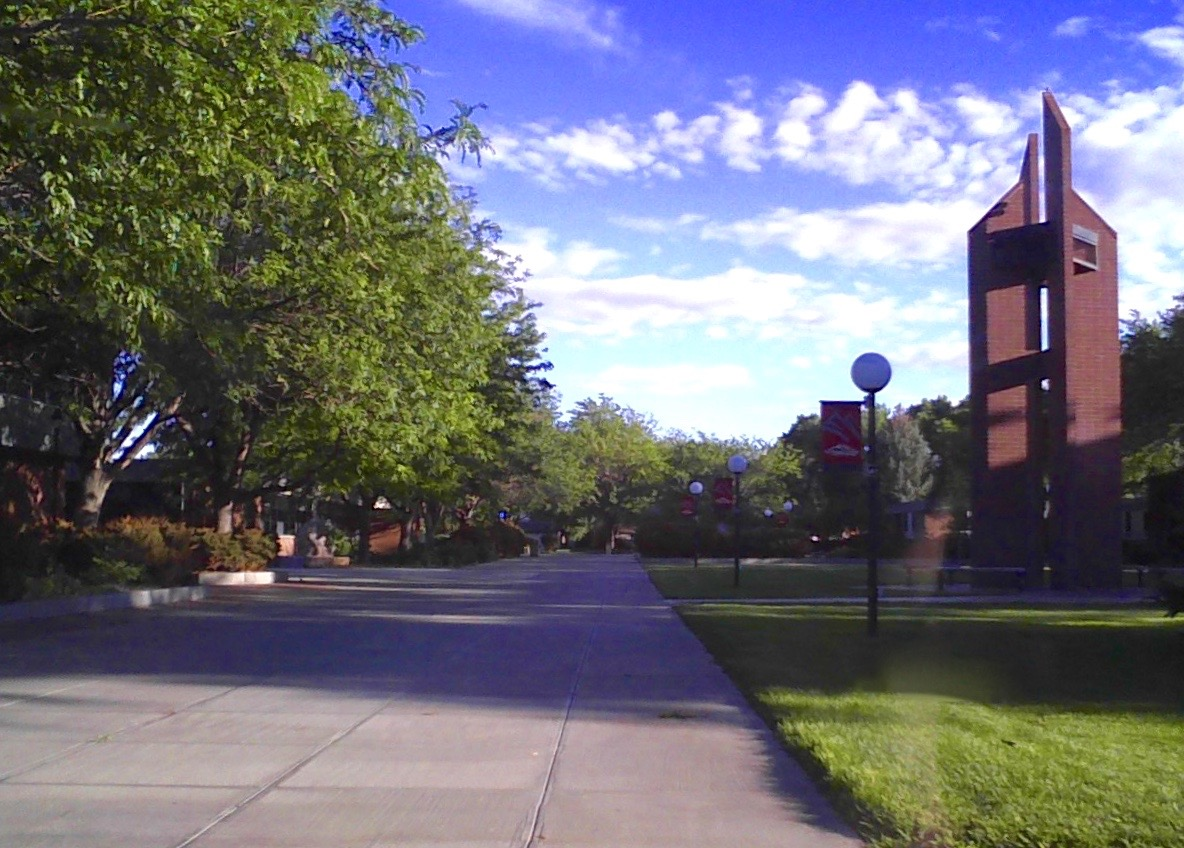
Northwest College, July 2015

=== Newspapers ===
The Powell Tribune is the local twice-weekly paper, founded in 1909. The Cody Enterprise and Billings Gazette are also available in Powell.

=== AM radio ===
- KZMQ (AM) 1140 country
- KPOW 1260 country
- KODI 1400 news/talk

=== FM radio ===
- KFGR 88.1 Christian
- KUWP 90.1 Wyoming Public Radio and NPR, University of Wyoming
- KTAG 97.9 adult contemporary
- KROW 101.1 active rock
- KZMQ-FM 100.3 country
- KBEN-FM 103.3 classic country
- KCGL 104.1 classic rock
- KWHO 107.1 80s, 90s & current

== Notable people ==
- Chris Cooley (born 1982), American football player
- Darren Dalton (born 1965), film actor (The Outsiders)
- W. Edwards Deming (1900–1993), worked to reconstruct the Japanese economy after World War II
- Dennis Havig (born 1949), American football player
- Dick Jones (1910–2008), politician who served in the state house and senate
- John Wetzel, mayor and state representative.

== See also ==
- List of municipalities in Wyoming
