= KVGL =

Simulcasting KCGL Powell
- Manderson, Wyoming; United States
- Frequency: 105.7 MHz
- Branding: 105.7 The Eagle

Programming
- Format: Classic hits

Ownership
- Owner: Legend Communications of Wyoming, LLC
- Sister stations: KWOR; KKLX; KZMQ; KZMQ-FM; KTAG; KCGL; KODI

History
- First air date: 2011
- Former call signs: KGCL (2006–2008); KYTS (2008–2018)
- Former frequencies: 105.1 MHz (2006–2010); 102.1 MHz (4/2010–6/2010)

Technical information
- Licensing authority: FCC
- Facility ID: 165979
- Class: C1
- ERP: 75,000 watts
- HAAT: 150 meters (490 ft)
- Transmitter coordinates: 44°3′34″N 107°51′13″W

Links
- Public license information: Public file; LMS
- Webcast: Listen live
- Website: mybighornbasin.com/kvgl-fm/

KVGL (105.7 FM) is a radio station licensed to cover Manderson, Wyoming, United States. The station is owned by Legend Communications of Wyoming, LLC.

== History ==
The station was assigned the call letters KGCL on July 20, 2006. On June 10, 2008, the station changed its call sign to KYTS.

The station was issued its license to cover on October 19, 2011. On November 19, 2014, it was announced that the station would be acquired by Legend Communications, sold by former owner Global News Consultants for $262,000, along with sister station KHRW 92.7 FM from Ranchester, Wyoming. The purchase was consummated on February 9, 2015.

The station changed its call sign to the current KVGL on May 15, 2018. It began simulcasting KCGL.

KVGL is owned by Legend Communications of Wyoming, LLC, which is the state's largest chain of radio stations. The station is managed under the company's regional umbrella, the Big Horn Radio Network. Legend Communications operates over 20 stations and three FM translators across Wyoming communities including Cody, Worland, Sheridan, and Gillette.

The company was co-founded by W. Lawrence "Larry" Patrick, a media industry veteran with a long career spanning five decades, including roles as a broadcaster, consultant, and media broker. Patrick holds a Ph.D. degree in communications and management and a J.D. degree in law and has been involved in over $8 billion worth of media transactions throughout his career.
