= Cody High School =

Cody High School can refer to:

- Frank Cody High School in Detroit, Michigan
- Cody High School in Cody, Wyoming
