= KZMQ =

KZMQ may refer to:

- KZMQ (AM), a radio station (1140 AM) licensed to Greybull, Wyoming, United States
- KZMQ-FM, a radio station (100.3 FM) licensed to Greybull, Wyoming, United States
