= Krow =

Krow may refer to:

- Alias of American open-source programmer Brian Aker
- Boss in the list of Donkey Kong characters
- King Krow, stage name of wrestler Dan Kroffat
- Roswell International Air Center (ICAO abbreviation)

As a radio sign, KROW may refer to:

- Former call sign of Dallas, Oregon radio station KWIP
- Former call sign of Dallas, Texas radio station KSPF
- Former call sign of Lovell, Wyoming radio station KWHO
- Former call sign of Oakland, California radio station KNEW (AM)
- KROW, Cody, Wyoming radio station
