= Jim Crawford (American football) =

American football player (1935–2018)

No. 30
- Positions: Halfback, fullback

Personal information
- Born: August 26, 1935; Greybull, Wyoming, U.S.
- Died: June 10, 2018 (aged 82); Coleman, Oklahoma, U.S.
- Listed height: 6 ft 1 in (1.85 m)
- Listed weight: 205 lb (93 kg)

Career information
- High school: Greybull
- College: Wyoming
- NFL draft: 1957: 14th round, 163rd overall pick

Career history
- Boston Patriots (1960-1964)

Awards and highlights
- First-team All-American (1956)

Career AFL statistics
- Rushing yards: 1,078
- Rushing average: 3.6
- Receptions: 52
- Receiving yards: 501
- Total touchdowns: 7
- Stats at Pro Football Reference

James Lee Crawford (August 26, 1935 – June 10, 2018) was an American professional football player who was a running back for five seasons with the Boston Patriots of the American Football League (AFL). He played college football for the Wyoming Cowboys. He ran for 1078 yards and caught for 501 in five years with Boston. He was nicknamed "Cowboy".

== See also ==
- List of college football yearly rushing leaders
