= Dennis Havig =

American football player (born 1949)

No. 56, 62
- Position: Guard

Personal information
- Born: May 6, 1949 (age 77); Powell, Wyoming, U.S.
- Listed height: 6 ft 2 in (1.88 m)
- Listed weight: 253 lb (115 kg)

Career information
- High school: Powell
- College: Colorado (1967–1970)
- NFL draft: 1971: 8th round, 189th overall pick

Career history
- Atlanta Falcons (1971–1975); Houston Oilers (1976); Green Bay Packers (1977)

Awards and highlights
- NFL All-Rookie Team (1972); Second-team All-American (1970); First-team All-Big Eight (1970)

Career NFL statistics
- Games played: 76
- Games started: 58 or 59 (Note: Sources conflict.)
- Fumble recoveries: 3
- Stats at Pro Football Reference

Dennis Eugene Havig (born May 6, 1949) is an American former professional football player who was a guard in the National Football League (NFL). After playing college football for the Colorado Buffaloes, he was selected by the Atlanta Falcons in the eighth round of the 1971 NFL draft. He later played for the Houston Oilers and Green Bay Packers.

== Early life ==
Havig was born on May 6, 1949, in Powell, Wyoming. He attended Powell High School and is their only alumnus to play in the NFL. He played three sports – football, basketball and track and field – and earned 10 varsity letters. In football, he was a fullback and linebacker; he was named all-state at both positions and was given the honor by Associated Press in consecutive years. He also twice was selected all-state as a center in basketball and served as co-captain in both sports as a senior. He earned the Wilford Mower Award as top student athlete in Western Wyoming and was named to the high school All-American team by the magazine Coach and Athletics. Havig was extensively recruited to play college football and ultimately chose to play for the Colorado Buffaloes.

== College career ==
Havig played for the Colorado freshman team in 1967. He lettered and became a starter at guard for the Buffaloes mid-season in 1968, helping them have a record of 4–6 that year. He retained his starting role as a junior in 1969 and helped them have a record of 8–3 while winning the Liberty Bowl over the Alabama Crimson Tide. Colorado reached the Liberty Bowl again in the 1970 season, Havig's senior year, with a 6–5 record. He was chosen first-team All-Big Eight Conference that year, second-team All-American, and was also invited to the Senior Bowl and to the East–West Shrine Bowl. Havig finished his collegiate career having been a three-year starter while earning three varsity letters.

== Professional career ==
Havig was chosen in the eighth round (189th overall) of the 1971 NFL draft by the Atlanta Falcons. He did not make the team's final roster that year but stayed on their taxi squad. He was named the Falcons' full-time starter in 1972 before even having seen any playing time. He ended up starting all 14 games that year and helped Atlanta finish with a record of 7–7, being named to the NFL's All-Rookie team and being chosen the team's rookie of the year. He then appeared in 14 games, 13 starts, in the 1973 season, repeated those totals in the 1974 season, and started all 13 games in which he appeared for the Falcons in 1975.

Havig was traded by the Falcons to the Houston Oilers in September 1976 in exchange for linebacker Guy Roberts. He played all 14 games for the Oilers that year, none as a starter. He was released by the team in August 1977. The following month, he was signed by the Green Bay Packers. He appeared in seven games for the team that year, between six and seven as a starter. He was released by the Packers in August 1978, ending his professional career. Havig finished his eight-season NFL career with 76 games played, 58 or 59 as a starter.

== Later life ==
Havig had five children. He earned a real estate license during his NFL career and later went into the insurance business at the suggestion of Falcons quarterback Pat Sullivan.
