= Cody, Wyoming =

City in Wyoming, US

- City
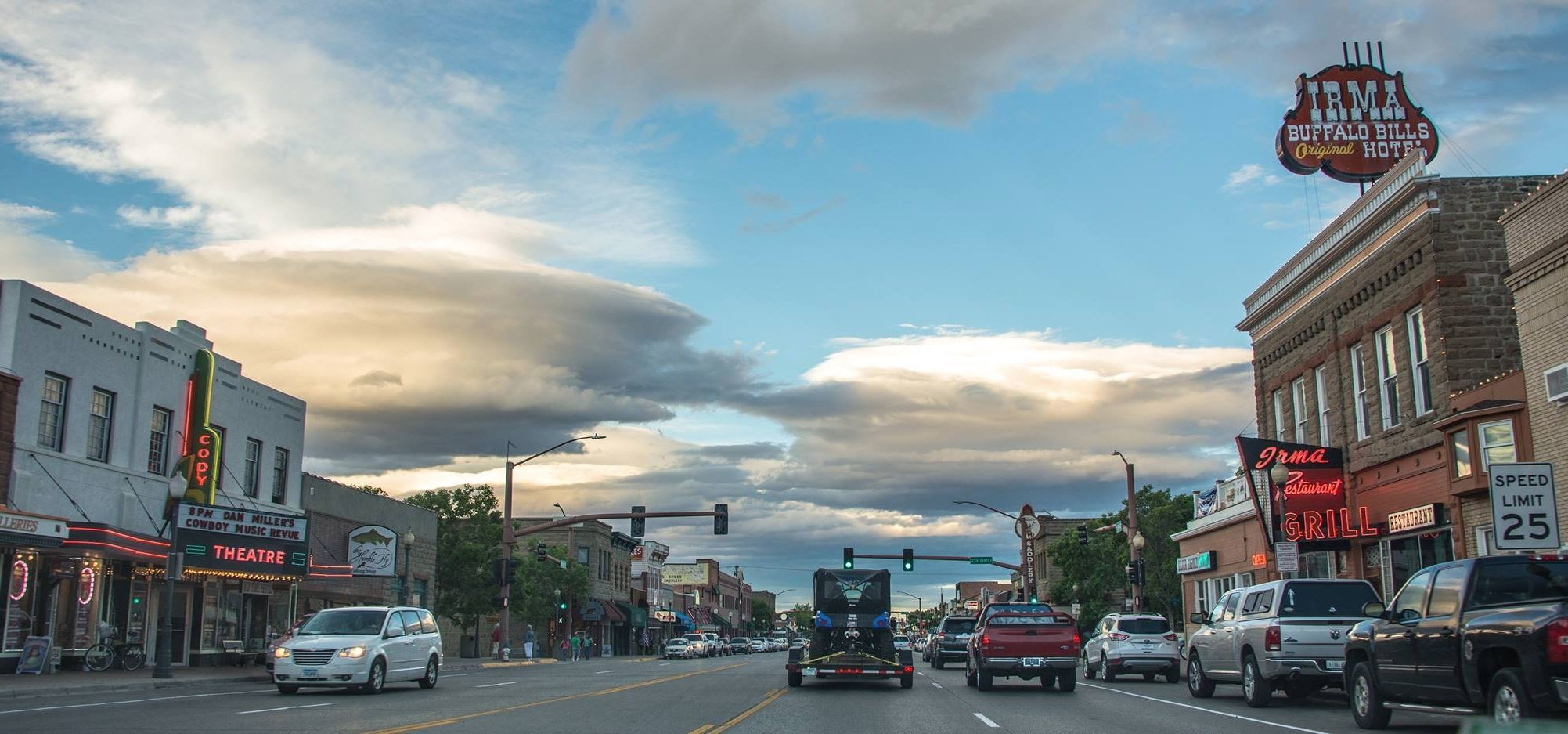
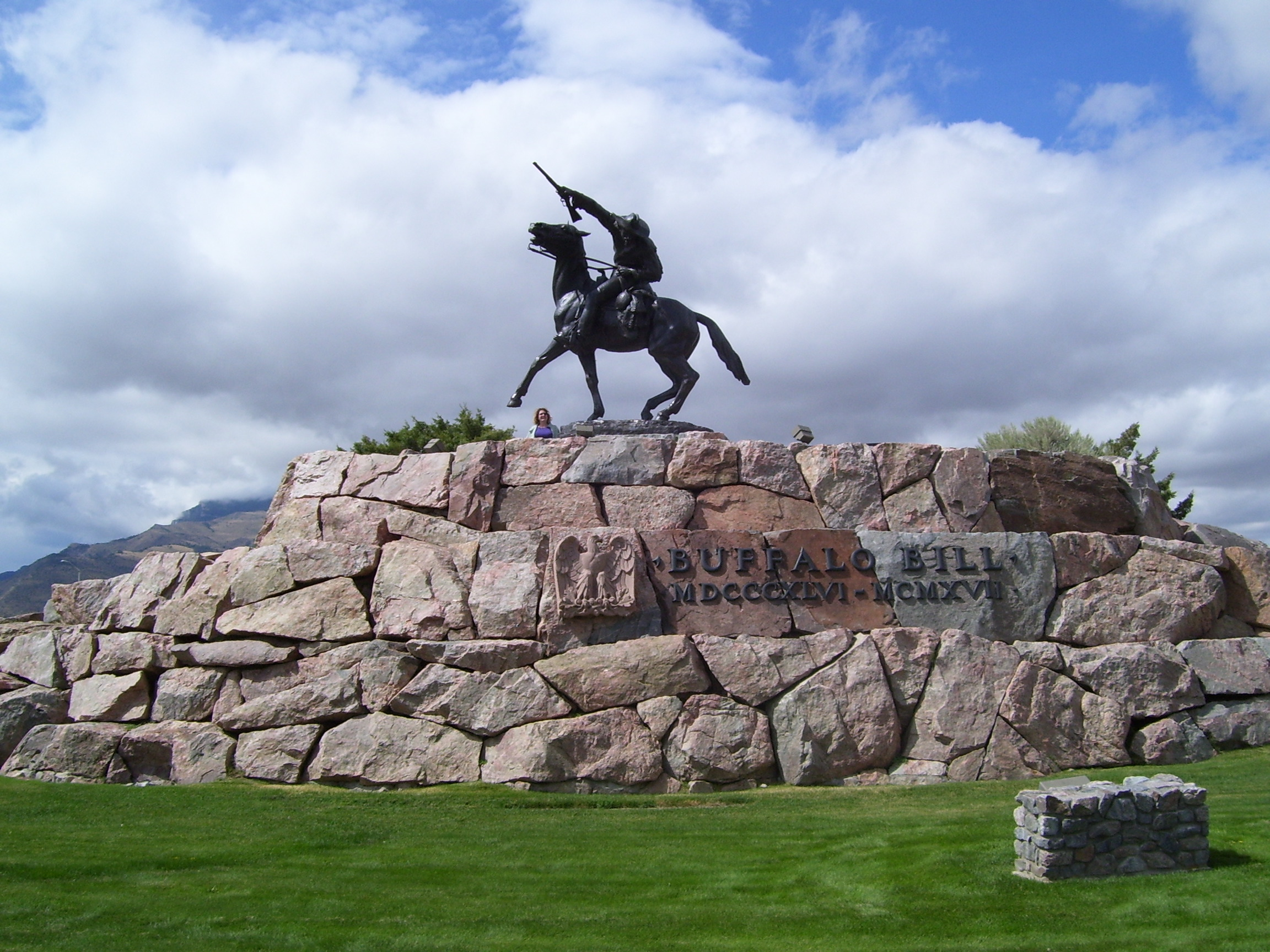
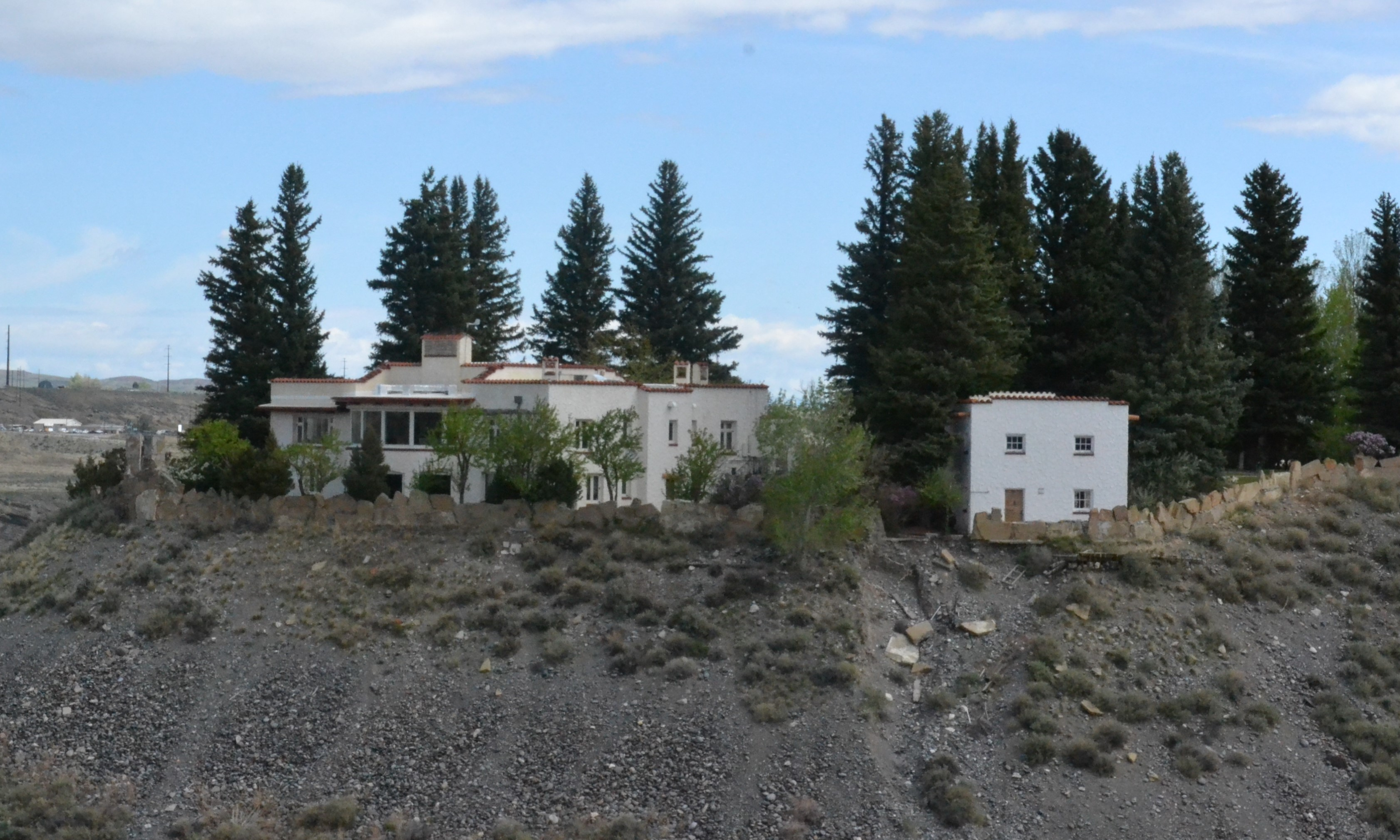
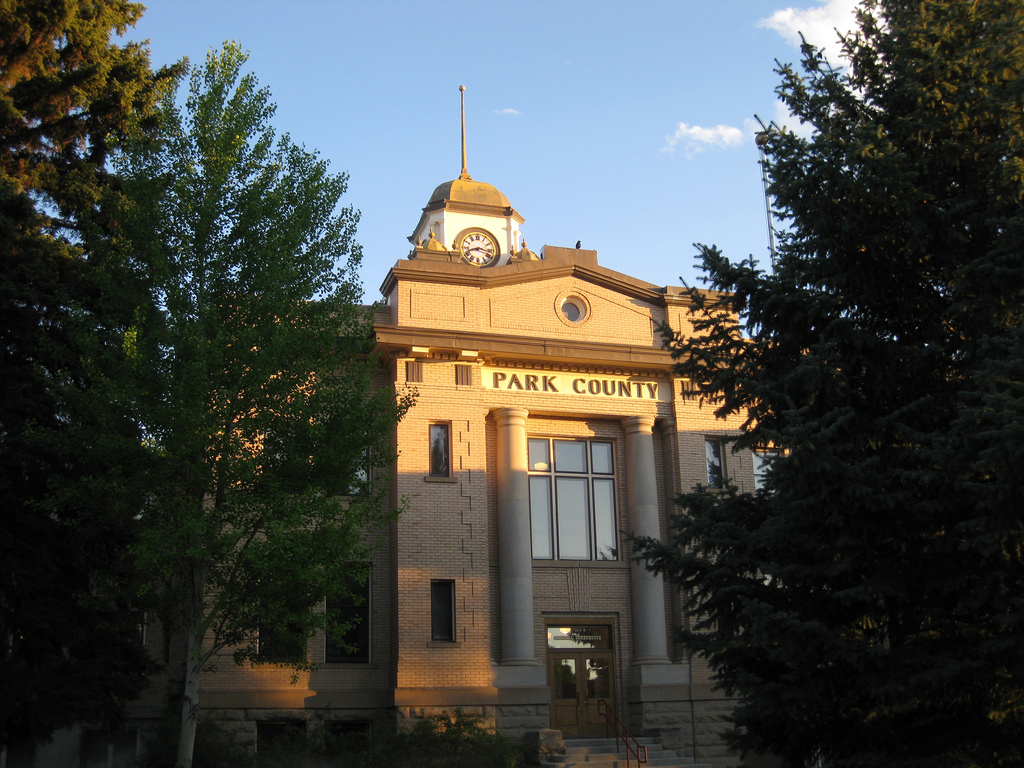
- Downtown Cody Buffalo Bill Statue Paul Stock House Park County Courthouse

- Flag

- Location of Cody in Park County, Wyoming
- Coordinates: 44°30′28″N 109°02′46″W
- Country: United States
- State: Wyoming
- County: Park
- Settled: 1896
- Incorporated: 1901
- Named for: Buffalo Bill Cody

Government
  - Type: Mayor–council
  - Mayor: Lee Ann Reiter

Area
  - Total: 10.46 sq mi (27.08 km^{2})
  - Land: 10.22 sq mi (26.47 km^{2})
  - Water: 0.24 sq mi (0.61 km^{2})
- Elevation: 5,066 ft (1,544 m)

Population (2020)
  - Total: 10,028
  - Density: 957.8/sq mi (369.79/km^{2})
- Time zone: UTC−7 (Mountain (MST))
  - Summer (DST): UTC−6 (MDT)
- ZIP code: 82414
- Area code: 307
- FIPS code: 56-15760
- GNIS feature ID: 2409499
- Website: codywy.gov

Cody is a city in and the county seat of Park County, Wyoming, United States. The population was 10,028 at the 2020 census, making Cody the eleventh-largest city in Wyoming by population. Cody is served by Yellowstone Regional Airport.

== History ==
The Shoshone and Crow people lived in the area before European settlers came. John Colter, a member of the Lewis and Clark Expedition, was likely the first to travel through the land that would become Cody. The 1851 Fort Laramie Treaty set this area in Crow territory. The 1868 Treaty placed the Crow Reservation to the north and Wind River Reservation to the South.

Cody is named after Buffalo Bill Cody for his part in the founding of Cody in 1896. His Shoshone Irrigation Company, through George T. Beck, laid out the town. He was personally involved in developing the town doing things like making sure the streets were wide and recommending liquor license fees were high enough to keep away rough trade. He owned the livery stable, blacksmith shop, and newspaper. He also had several nearby ranches, a company to mine coal and to drill oil wells.

The Cody Townsite Company was formed to sell lots.

The Chicago, Burlington and Quincy Railroad completed its spur line to Cody in 1901. Cody was incorporated that same year.

Named for his daughter, Cody built the Irma Hotel in 1902. Still open as a hotel and restaurant, it was listed on the National Register of Historic Places in 1972. He wanted a fine hotel to appeal to tourists traveling to Yellowstone National Park. He and Beck marked the route for a wagon road to the park. Tourism continues to have a major economic impact.

When Park County was separated from Big Horn County in 1909, Cody became the county seat. In 1911 voters elected three county commissioners. In 1963 a group in Powell, Wyoming, attempted to create a new county out of Park County as they felt Cody was overrepresented. It was not successful.

In 1983 a new courthouse was built. Originally the county intended to demolish the old courthouse but heeded community protests to keep the structure.

In 2024 the Caleco Foundry burned down. It was one of only two foundries in Wyoming. Multiple artists had molds at the foundry and all were destroyed. One artist estimated his loss at five million dollars. In 2025 the nearby town of Meeteetse began plans to build a new foundry.

== Geography ==
According to the United States Census Bureau, the city has a total area of 10.43 square miles (27.01 km^{2}), of which 10.20 square miles (26.42 km^{2}) is land and 0.23 square miles (0.60 km^{2}) is water.

The Shoshone River flows through Cody in a canyon. There are four bridges over this river in the Cody vicinity, one at the north edge of town that allows travel to the north, and one about 5 miles (8.0 km) east of Cody that allows passage to Powell and the areas to the north and east. The other two are west of town; one allows access to the East Gate of Yellowstone National Park, and the other is used by fishermen in Shoshone Canyon and as access to the Buffalo Bill Dam.

Cody is located at the western edge of the Bighorn Basin, a depression surrounded by the Big Horn, Owl Creek, Bridger, and Absaroka ranges. At the western edge of Cody, a deep canyon formed by the Shoshone River provides the only passage to Yellowstone's Eastern Entrance. At its mouth and rising above Cody are Rattlesnake Mountain on the north side and Cedar Mountain on the south side. Much of Cody has views of Heart Mountain, whose 8,123 ft (2,500 m) peak is 9 miles (14 km) directly north of Cody, and the Carter Mountain massif, which forms a line with peaks above 12,000 ft (3,700 m), some 15 miles (24 km) to the south.

=== Climate ===
Cody has a typical Western US cool semi-arid climate (Köppen BSk), chatacterized by warm summers and freezing, dry winters. The settlement enjoys about 300 days of sunshine per year, and is in USDA plant hardiness zone 5a (−20 to −15 °F; −29 to −26 °C).

The Buffalo Bill Dam between Rattlesnake and Cedar mountains forms a large reservoir about 10 miles (16 km) to the west of Cody. This reservoir (among others) feeds the Shoshone Project, a large irrigation water distribution system.

The wettest calendar year has been 2014 with 16.59 inches (421.4 mm) and the driest 1956 with 3.58 inches (90.9 mm). The most precipitation in one month was 5.76 in (146 mm) in June 1992, and the most in 24 hours 2.51 inches or 64 millimeters on July 22, 1973. There are an average of 72.3 days with measurable precipitation. The most snow in one year was 73.4 inches (1.9 m) between July 1916 and June 1917. The most snow in one month was 29.0 inches (0.74 m) in February 2014.

Climate data for Cody, Wyoming, 1991–2020 normals, extremes 1915–present
| Month | Jan | Feb | Mar | Apr | May | Jun | Jul | Aug | Sep | Oct | Nov | Dec | Year |
|---|---|---|---|---|---|---|---|---|---|---|---|---|---|
| Record high °F (°C) | 68 (20) | 75 (24) | 79 (26) | 87 (31) | 94 (34) | 103 (39) | 106 (41) | 103 (39) | 100 (38) | 87 (31) | 74 (23) | 67 (19) | 106 (41) |
| Mean maximum °F (°C) | 56.2 (13.4) | 56.5 (13.6) | 66.4 (19.1) | 75.3 (24.1) | 81.6 (27.6) | 89.8 (32.1) | 94.9 (34.9) | 93.2 (34.0) | 88.4 (31.3) | 78.0 (25.6) | 64.3 (17.9) | 55.4 (13.0) | 95.6 (35.3) |
| Mean daily maximum °F (°C) | 37.5 (3.1) | 38.7 (3.7) | 48.7 (9.3) | 55.3 (12.9) | 64.4 (18.0) | 74.8 (23.8) | 84.0 (28.9) | 82.2 (27.9) | 72.3 (22.4) | 58.0 (14.4) | 44.8 (7.1) | 36.5 (2.5) | 58.1 (14.5) |
| Daily mean °F (°C) | 27.5 (−2.5) | 28.6 (−1.9) | 37.7 (3.2) | 44.2 (6.8) | 53.1 (11.7) | 62.4 (16.9) | 70.6 (21.4) | 68.9 (20.5) | 59.7 (15.4) | 46.9 (8.3) | 35.2 (1.8) | 27.3 (−2.6) | 46.8 (8.3) |
| Mean daily minimum °F (°C) | 17.5 (−8.1) | 18.5 (−7.5) | 26.8 (−2.9) | 33.0 (0.6) | 41.9 (5.5) | 50.0 (10.0) | 57.3 (14.1) | 55.6 (13.1) | 47.2 (8.4) | 35.9 (2.2) | 25.5 (−3.6) | 18.0 (−7.8) | 35.6 (2.0) |
| Mean minimum °F (°C) | −8.6 (−22.6) | −3.2 (−19.6) | 5.6 (−14.7) | 17.6 (−8.0) | 28.0 (−2.2) | 38.1 (3.4) | 47.5 (8.6) | 43.3 (6.3) | 31.8 (−0.1) | 16.5 (−8.6) | 2.1 (−16.6) | −5.7 (−20.9) | −16.0 (−26.7) |
| Record low °F (°C) | −40 (−40) | −46 (−43) | −23 (−31) | −18 (−28) | 15 (−9) | 25 (−4) | 33 (1) | 29 (−2) | 9 (−13) | −11 (−24) | −24 (−31) | −35 (−37) | −46 (−43) |
| Average precipitation inches (mm) | 0.37 (9.4) | 0.46 (12) | 0.55 (14) | 1.35 (34) | 2.18 (55) | 1.62 (41) | 0.89 (23) | 0.90 (23) | 1.15 (29) | 0.99 (25) | 0.59 (15) | 0.46 (12) | 11.51 (292.4) |
| Average snowfall inches (cm) | 7.3 (19) | 7.5 (19) | 5.8 (15) | 5.9 (15) | 0.8 (2.0) | 0.0 (0.0) | 0.0 (0.0) | 0.0 (0.0) | 0.4 (1.0) | 3.4 (8.6) | 6.4 (16) | 7.5 (19) | 45.0 (114) |
| Average precipitation days (≥ 0.01 in) | 3.2 | 4.0 | 4.8 | 7.7 | 10.4 | 9.1 | 6.8 | 7.1 | 5.8 | 5.7 | 4.0 | 3.7 | 72.3 |
| Average snowy days (≥ 0.1 in) | 2.7 | 3.3 | 2.7 | 2.3 | 0.2 | 0.0 | 0.0 | 0.0 | 0.2 | 1.3 | 2.6 | 3.2 | 18.5 |
Source 1: NOAAall-time extreme temperature
Source 2: National Weather Service

== Demographics ==
Historical population
| Census | Pop. | Note | %± |
|---|---|---|---|
| 1910 | 1,132 | | — |
| 1920 | 1,242 | | 9.7% |
| 1930 | 1,800 | | 44.9% |
| 1940 | 2,536 | | 40.9% |
| 1950 | 3,872 | | 52.7% |
| 1960 | 4,838 | | 24.9% |
| 1970 | 5,161 | | 6.7% |
| 1980 | 6,599 | | 27.9% |
| 1990 | 7,897 | | 19.7% |
| 2000 | 8,835 | | 11.9% |
| 2010 | 9,520 | | 7.8% |
| 2020 | 10,028 | | 5.3% |
| 2023 (est.) | 10,240 | | 2.1% |

=== 2020 census ===
As of the 2020 census, Cody had a population of 10,028 and 4,596 households. The population density was 981.7 people per square mile. 98.3% of residents lived in urban areas, while 1.7% lived in rural areas.

The median age was 42.8 years. 21.6% of residents were under the age of 18, 6.6% were under 5, and 23.5% were 65 years of age or older. For every 100 females there were 92.4 males, and for every 100 females age 18 and over there were 90.3 males age 18 and over.

Of all households, 23.9% had children under the age of 18 living in them. 44.7% were married-couple households, 19.3% were households with a male householder and no spouse or partner present, and 29.5% were households with a female householder and no spouse or partner present. About 35.8% of all households were made up of individuals and 15.9% had someone living alone who was 65 years of age or older.

There were 5,068 housing units, of which 9.3% were vacant. The homeowner vacancy rate was 1.9% and the rental vacancy rate was 8.4%.

Racial composition as of the 2020 census
| Race | Number | Percent |
|---|---|---|
| White | 9,145 | 91.2% |
| Black or African American | 24 | 0.2% |
| American Indian and Alaska Native | 48 | 0.5% |
| Asian | 85 | 0.8% |
| Native Hawaiian and Other Pacific Islander | 6 | 0.1% |
| Some other race | 130 | 1.3% |
| Two or more races | 590 | 5.9% |
| Hispanic or Latino (of any race) | 489 | 4.9% |

=== 2010 census ===
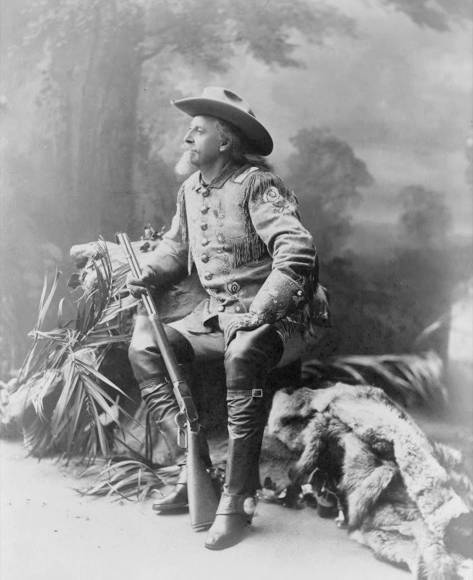
Buffalo Bill Cody, 1903

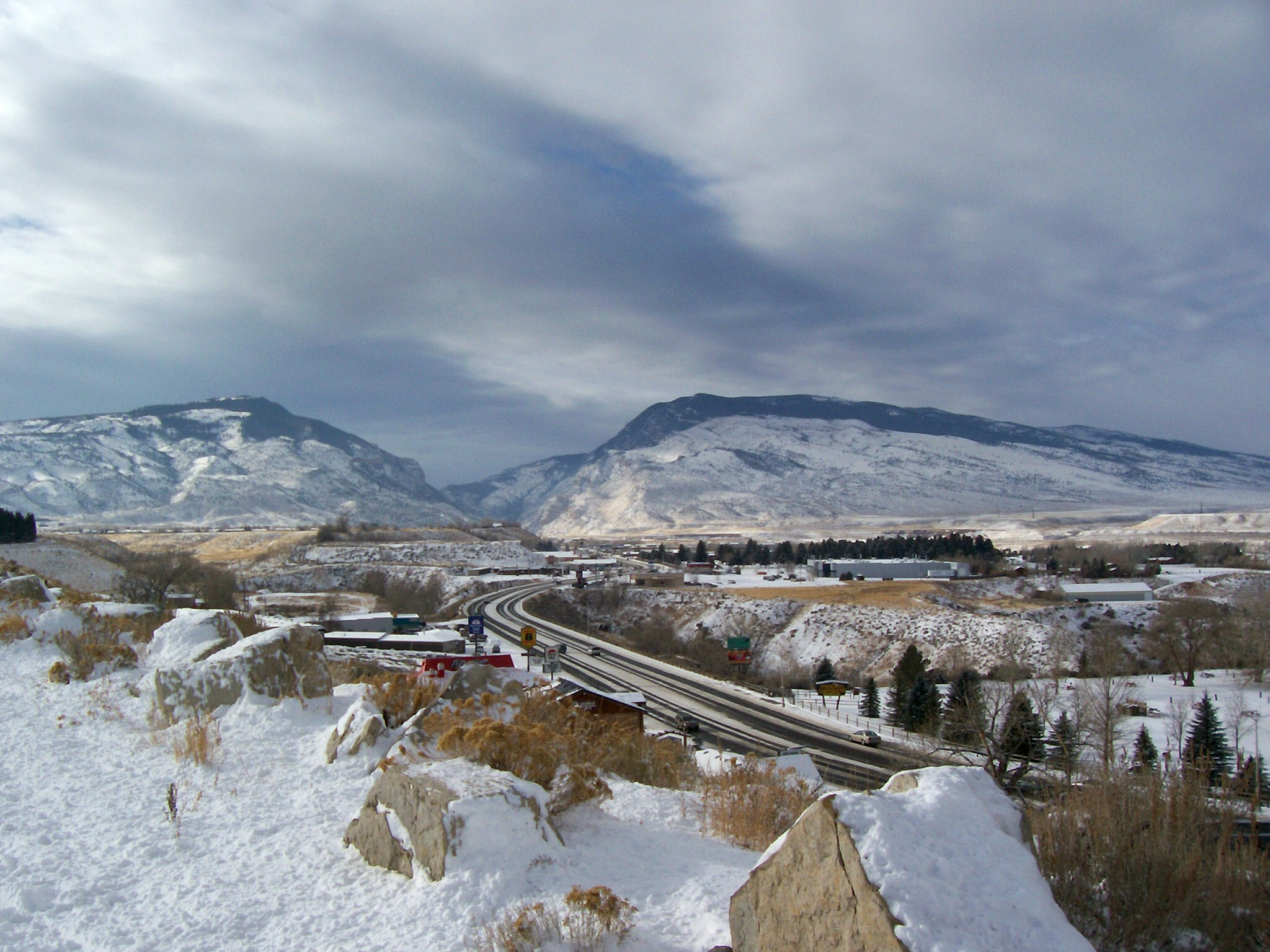
West end of Cody

As of the census of 2010, there were 9,520 people, 4,278 households, and 2,502 families living in the city. The population density was 933.3 inhabitants per square mile (360.3/km^{2}). There were 4,650 housing units at an average density of 455.9 per square mile (176.0/km^{2}). The racial makeup of the city was 95.9% White, 0.2% African American, 0.7% Native American, 0.4% Asian, 0.1% Pacific Islander, 1.0% from other races, and 1.8% from two or more races. Hispanic or Latino residents of any race were 3.1% of the population.

There were 4,278 households, of which 26.5% had children under the age of 18 living with them, 45.0% were married couples living together, 9.5% had a female householder with no husband present, 4.0% had a male householder with no wife present, and 41.5% were non-families. 34.8% of all households were made up of individuals, and 13.2% had someone living alone who was 65 years of age or older. The average household size was 2.19 and the average family size was 2.82.

The median age in the city was 42.4 years. 21.8% of residents were under the age of 18; 7.1% were between the ages of 18 and 24; 24.1% were from 25 to 44; 28.9% were from 45 to 64; and 18.2% were 65 years of age or older. The gender makeup of the city was 48.2% male and 51.8% female.

=== 2000 census ===
As of the census of 2000, there were 8,835 people, 3,791 households, and 2,403 families living in the city. The population density was 952.3 people per square mile (367.6/km^{2}). There were 4,113 housing units at an average density of 443.3 per square mile (171.1/km^{2}). The racial makeup of the city was 96.90% White, 0.10% African American, 0.42% Native American, 0.58% Asian, 0.05% Pacific Islander, 0.85% from other races, and 1.11% from two or more races. Hispanic or Latino people of any race were 2.22% of the population.

There were 3,791 households, out of which 29.0% had children under the age of 18 living with them, 50.7% were married couples living together, 9.5% had a female householder with no husband present, and 36.6% were non-families. 32.2% of all households were made up of individuals, and 12.4% had someone living alone who was 65 years of age or older. The average household size was 2.27 and the average family size was 2.86.

In the city, the population was spread out, with 24.8% under the age of 18, 7.2% from 18 to 24, 26.4% from 25 to 44, 24.9% from 45 to 64, and 16.6% who were 65 years of age or older. The median age was 40 years. For every 100 females, there were 90.9 males. For every 100 females age 18 and over, there were 88.1 males.

The median income for a household in the city was $34,450, and the median income for a family was $40,554. Males had a median income of $31,395 versus $19,947 for females. The per capita income for the city was $17,813. About 9.4% of families and 13.9% of the population were below the poverty line, including 19.3% of those under age 18 and 11.0% of those age 65 or over.

=== Income ===
The median household income was $59,682, and the per capita income was $34,127. People under the poverty line made up 8.9% of the population.

== Economy ==
In 1938 Glenn Nielsen, along with investors, purchased the assets of Park Refining Company, started four years earlier by area oil developer Valentine M. Kirk. By 1952 it was publicly traded as Husky Oil Company headquartered in Cody. Husky operated as refinery until the 1980s, the facility being demolished in the 1990s.

Being the closest town to the east entrance of Yellowstone National Park draws tourists through town. The town has needed infrastructure to support the 300,000 to 400,000 people who visit the town of only around 10,000 residents. The town relies on the J-1 visa to bring in additional employees for their hotels and restaurants.

The largest employers in Cody are health care and social assistance (972 people), retail trade (845 people), and educational services (501 people).

Cattle and sheep operations are near town.

== Government ==
Cody has a mayor and town council. There is also a City Administrator. The Administrator is appointed by the Council. The mayor is non-partisan, elected at-large, and has a four year term. The city council consists of six members who represent three wards. They serve four year terms.

In the 2024 elections Lee Ann Reiter was elected mayor. She replaced Matt Hall who chose not to run for a third term.

== Arts and culture ==
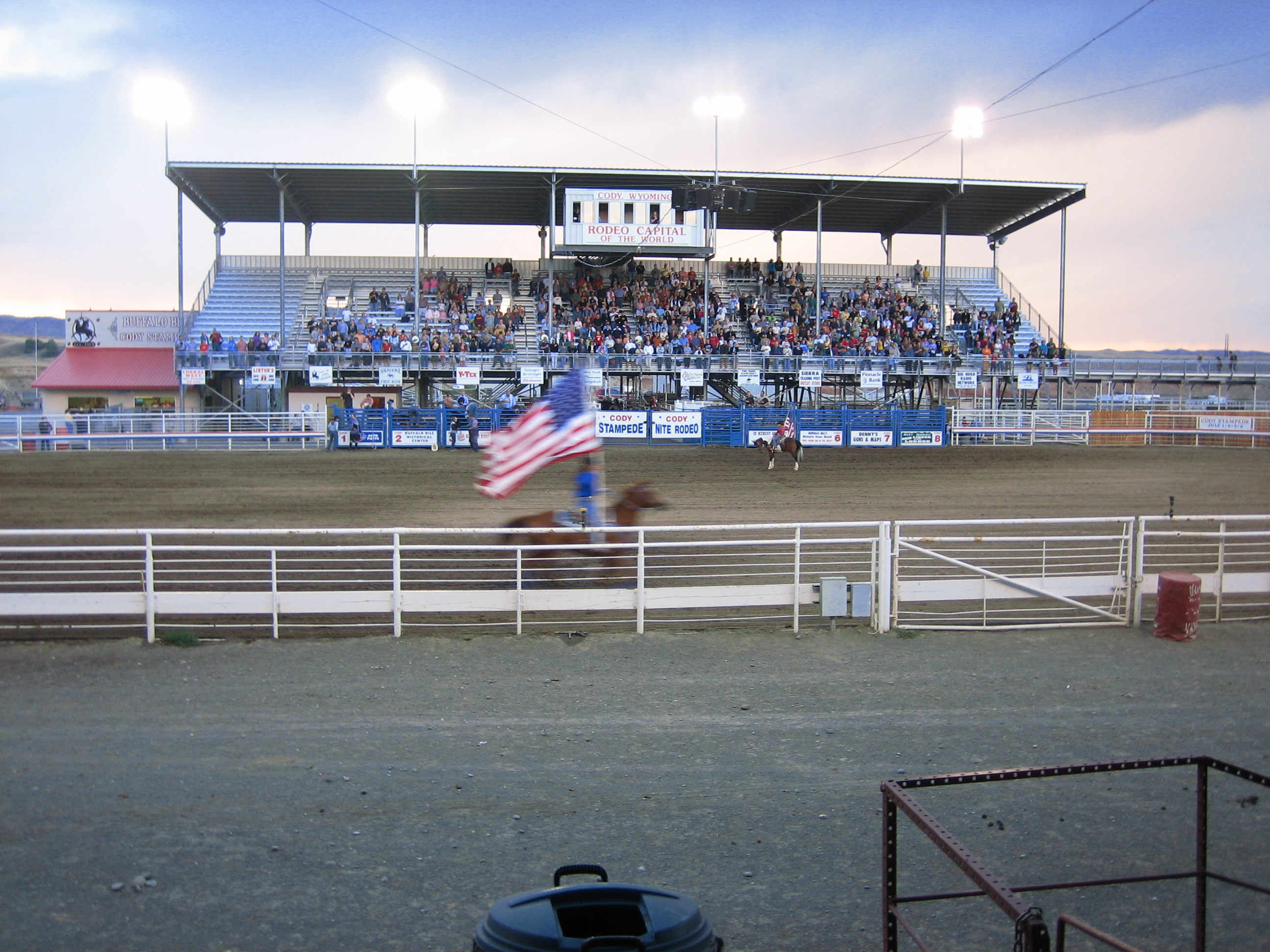
Cody Nite Rodeo

The Buffalo Bill Center of the West features the Draper Natural History Museum, the Plains Indian Museum, the Cody Firearms Museum, the Whitney Western Art Museum and the Buffalo Bill Museum, which chronicles the life of William F. Cody, for whom the center is named. Old Trail Town is a restoration of more than 25 historic Western buildings and artifacts.

Cody calls itself the "Rodeo Capital of the World", and the Cody Nite Rodeo is an annual amateur rodeo event. The Cody Stampede Rodeo is a Professional Rodeo Cowboys Association rodeo, one of the largest rodeos in the United States. It features a stampede, parades, rodeos, and fireworks.

Cody has a public library, a branch of the Park County Library System.

The Whitney Western Arts Museum, and the Cody Country Art League are local galleries.

Rendezvous Royale art festival features the Buffalo Bill Art Show and Sale. The Concert in the Park series features the Cody Cattle Company. The Rocky Mountain Dance Theatre is a local dance company.

The town has more than twenty developed parks. There are also developed pathways throughout the town.

== Education ==
Public education in the city of Cody is provided by Park County School District #6. Three elementary schools – Eastside, Glenn Livingston, and Sunset - serve students in grades kindergarten through five. The district's three secondary campuses are Cody Middle School (grades 6–8), Cody High School (grades 9–12), and Heart Mountain Academy (grades 9–12).

== Media ==
AM Radio:

- KZMQ (AM) 1140 (country)
- KPOW 1260 (country)
- KODI 1400 (news talk)

FM Radio:

- KOFG 91.1 (religious)
- KUWP 90.1 (Wyoming Public Radio and NPR), University of Wyoming
- KTAG 97.9 (adult contemporary)
- KZMQ-FM 100.3 (country)
- KROW 101.1 (contemporary Christian)
- KBEN-FM 103.3 (classic country)
- KCGL 104.1 (classic hits)
- KWHO 107.1 (classic rock)

Television:

- KTVQ (CBS) from Billings
- KULR (NBC) from Billings
- K19LM-D (PBS) (translator for KCWC-DT in Lander)

=== Newspaper ===
The twice-weekly Cody Enterprise was founded by "Buffalo Bill" Cody and Col. John Peake in August 1899. The paper has a paid circulation of 7,050, and is owned by SAGE Publishing of Cody.

== Infrastructure ==
=== Transportation ===
==== Highways ====
- U.S. 14
- U.S. 16
- U.S. 20
- U.S.14A - Powell Highway
- 120
- 291 - South Fork Road

==== Airport ====
The Yellowstone Regional Airport offers passenger service.

==== Railroad ====
Cody is served by the Cody Branch of the BNSF Railway, which runs south-west from Frannie for about 46 miles (74 km). The branch terminates in Cody.

== Notable people ==
- Laura Bell, author, currently residing in Cody
- Luke Bell (1990–2022), country musician, raised in Cody
- Eric Bischoff (born 1955), former President of World Championship Wrestling
- Quin Blair, businessman and member of the Wyoming House of Representatives
- William Frederick Cody a.k.a. "Buffalo Bill", namesake of city
- Larry Echo Hawk, former attorney general of Idaho
- Frank Tenney Johnson (1874–1939), western artist
- Mike Leach (1961–2022), football coach
- John Linebaugh, gunsmith; cartridge inventor
- Jackson Pollock (1912–1956), abstract expressionist painter
- Colin M. Simpson (born 1959), former Wyoming State Representative
- Milward Simpson (1897–1993), former governor of Wyoming and U.S. senator
- Pete Simpson (born 1930), historian; former administrator at the University of Wyoming
- Mark Spragg (born 1952), author, born in Cody
- Craig L. Thomas (1933–2007), former United States Senator from Wyoming

== Sister cities ==
- (Georgia (country)) Lanchkhuti, Georgia

== See also ==
- List of municipalities in Wyoming
- Angling in Yellowstone National Park
