= KCWB =

KCWB may refer to:

- KCWB (FM), a radio station (92.1 FM) licensed to serve Byron, Wyoming, United States
- KCWE, a television station (channel 29 analog/31 digital) licensed to Kansas City, Missouri, United States, which used the call sign KCWB from March 1996 to August 1998
- KCWQ-LP, a defunct low-power television station (channel 2) formerly licensed to Palm Springs, California, which formerly used the call sign KCWB
