= Brett Keisel =

American football player (born 1978)

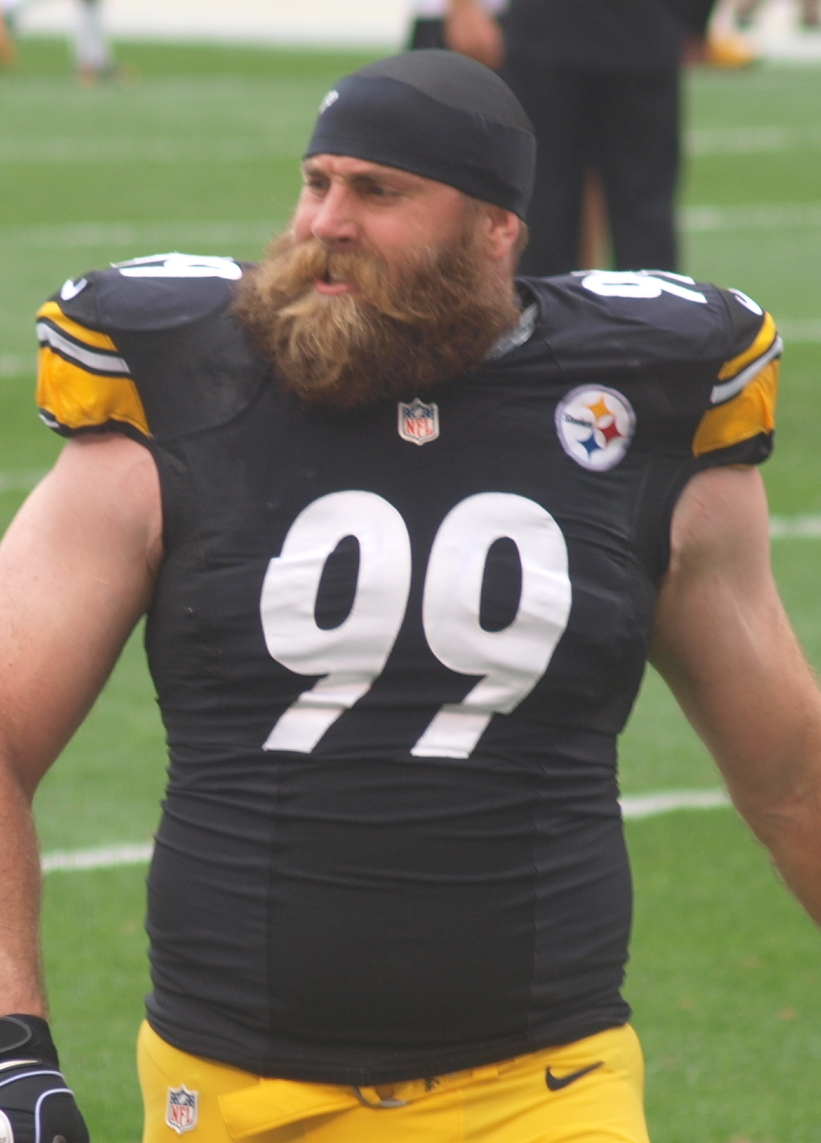
- Keisel with the Pittsburgh Steelers in 2013

No. 99
- Position: Defensive end

Personal information
- Born: September 19, 1978 (age 48); Provo, Utah, U.S.
- Listed height: 6 ft 5 in (1.96 m)
- Listed weight: 285 lb (129 kg)

Career information
- High school: Greybull (Greybull, Wyoming)
- College: BYU
- NFL draft: 2002: 7th round, 242nd overall pick

Career history
- Pittsburgh Steelers (2002–2014)

Awards and highlights
- 2× Super Bowl champion (XL, XLIII); Pro Bowl (2010)

Career NFL statistics
- Total tackles: 408
- Sacks: 30.0
- Forced fumbles: 7
- Fumble recoveries: 9
- Interceptions: 2
- Defensive touchdowns: 1
- Stats at Pro Football Reference

Brett Keisel (born September 19, 1978) is an American former professional football player who was a defensive end for 13 seasons with the Pittsburgh Steelers of the National Football League (NFL). He played college football for the BYU Cougars. He was selected by the Steelers in the seventh round of the 2002 NFL draft.

== College career ==
Keisel was redshirted his freshman year at BYU. He played defensive end his sophomore year and then the following year transferred to Snow College. He then returned to BYU to finish his college football career. Keisel had a total of 66 tackles, with 39 being solo tackles, 9 quarterback sacks, and 19 stops behind the line of scrimmage.

== Professional career ==
Pre-draft measurables
Height	Weight	Arm length	Hand span	40-yard dash	10-yard split	20-yard split	20-yard shuttle	Three-cone drill	Vertical jump	Broad jump	Bench press
6 ft 5 in (1.96 m)	279 lb (127 kg)	33 1/2 in (0.85 m)	9 3/4 in (0.25 m)	4.93 s	1.77 s	2.91 s	4.51 s	7.28 s	33.5 in (0.85 m)	8 ft 11 in (2.72 m)	26 reps
All values from NFL Combine

=== Pittsburgh Steelers ===
The Pittsburgh Steelers selected Keisel in the seventh round (242nd overall) of the 2002 NFL draft. Keisel was the 21st defensive end drafted in 2002.

On July 23, 2002, the Pittsburgh Steelers signed Keisel to a three-year, $932,000 contract.

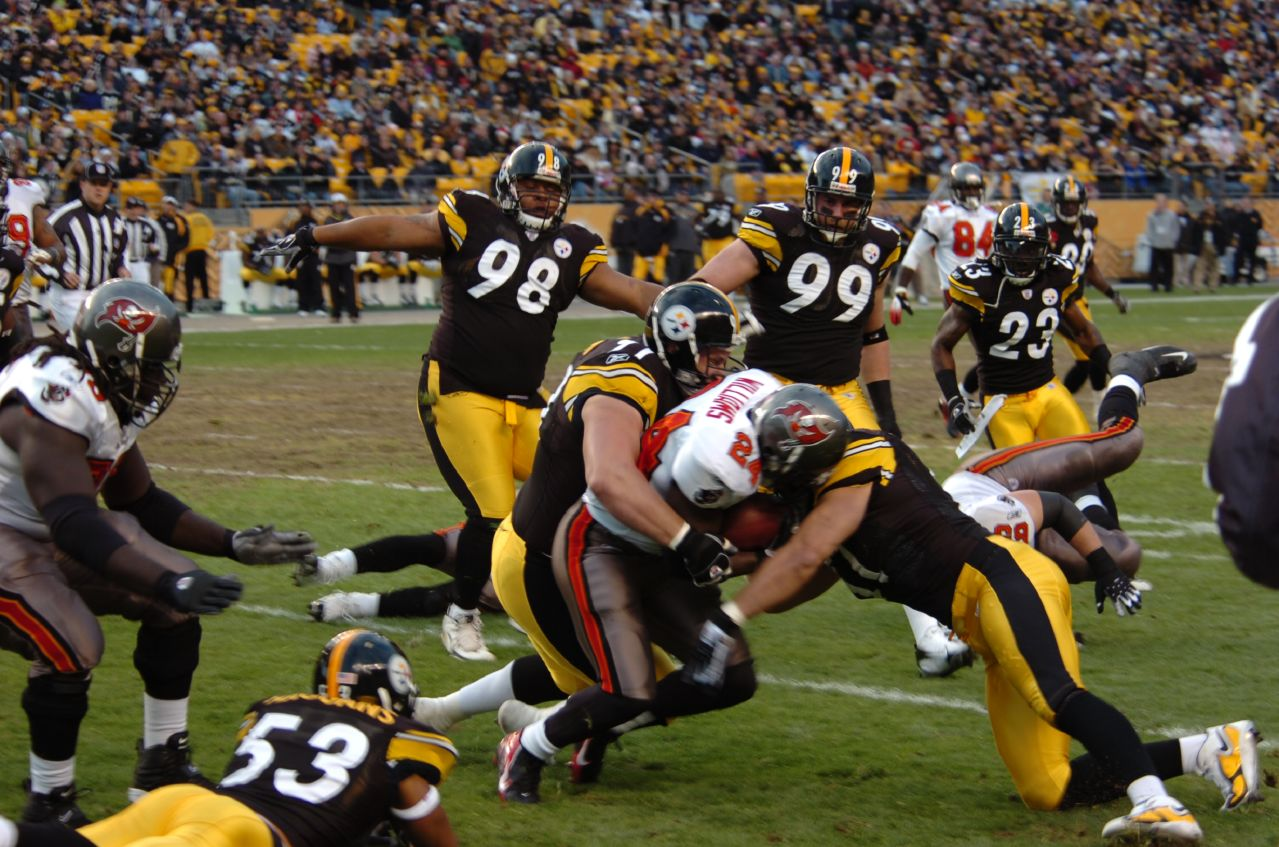
Keisel (99) during a game in 2006

As a rookie, he made five appearances, making four tackles.

In 2003, he was on the injured reserve list for the entire season after undergoing surgery on a shoulder injury. He returned in the 2004 season with 13 appearances and nine tackles. The following year, he appeared in all 16 games recording 33 tackles and three sacks, the first of his NFL career. After the departure of Kimo von Oelhoffen via free agency for the New York Jets in March 2006, Keisel signed a new four-year contract with the Steelers, worth a reported 14 million dollars. That season, he won the starting position at right defensive end and played in all 16 games making 55 tackles and 5.5 sacks, a career-high. The 2005 season would mark Keisel's first Super Bowl win with Super Bowl XL in which the Steelers defeated the Seattle Seahawks 21-10. He recorded three tackles, all on Shaun Alexander.

In 2007, he made 16 appearances recording 39 tackles and two sacks. He followed up the 2007 season by making 22 tackles, and a sack. Keisel won his second Super Bowl this season when the Steelers defeated the Arizona Cardinals 27-23. Keisel recovered a game sealing fumble by Kurt Warner during the final seconds of the game.

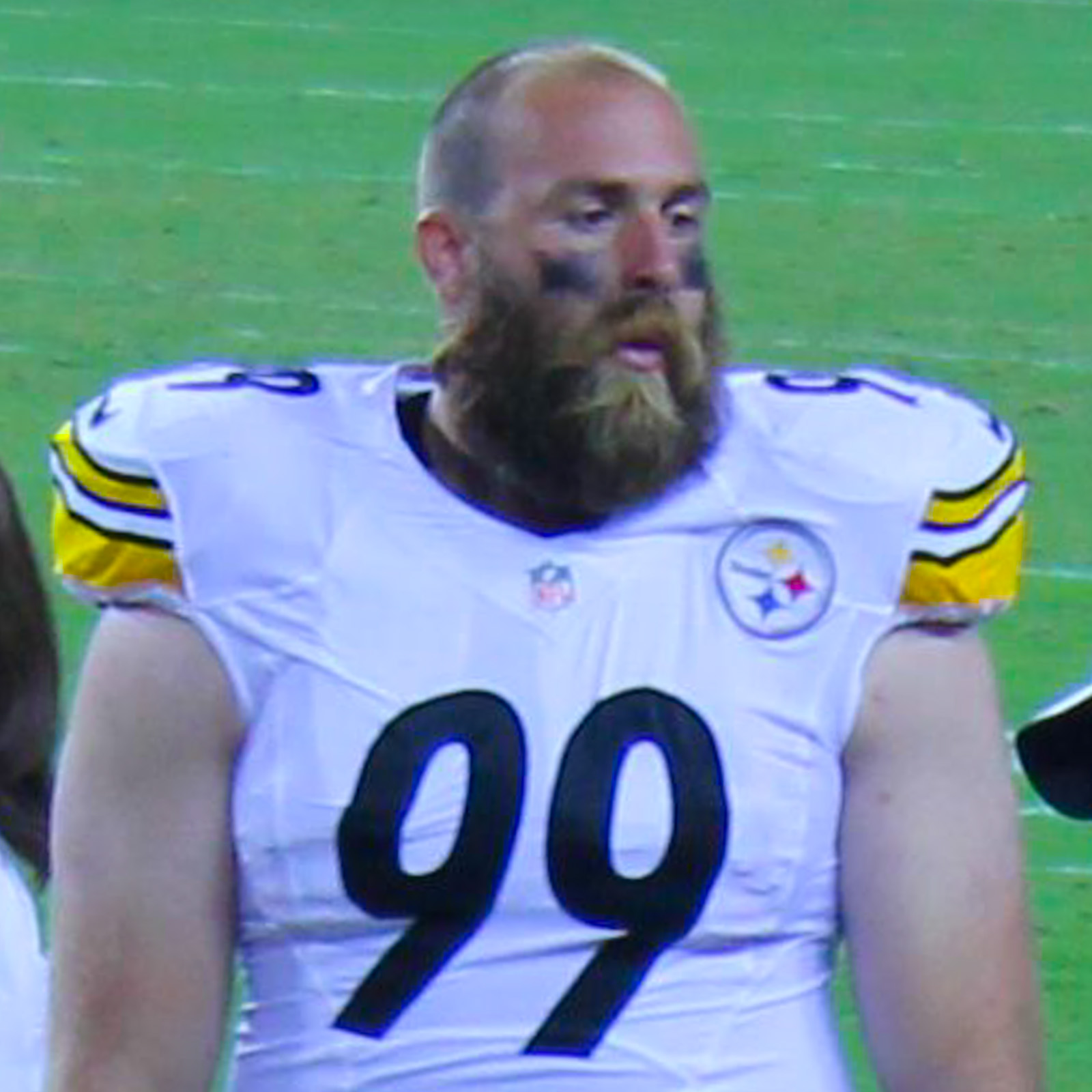
Keisel before a preseason game in August 2013

On August 31, 2009, the Steelers signed Keisel to a new five-year contract worth $18.885 million, including a $5 million signing bonus.

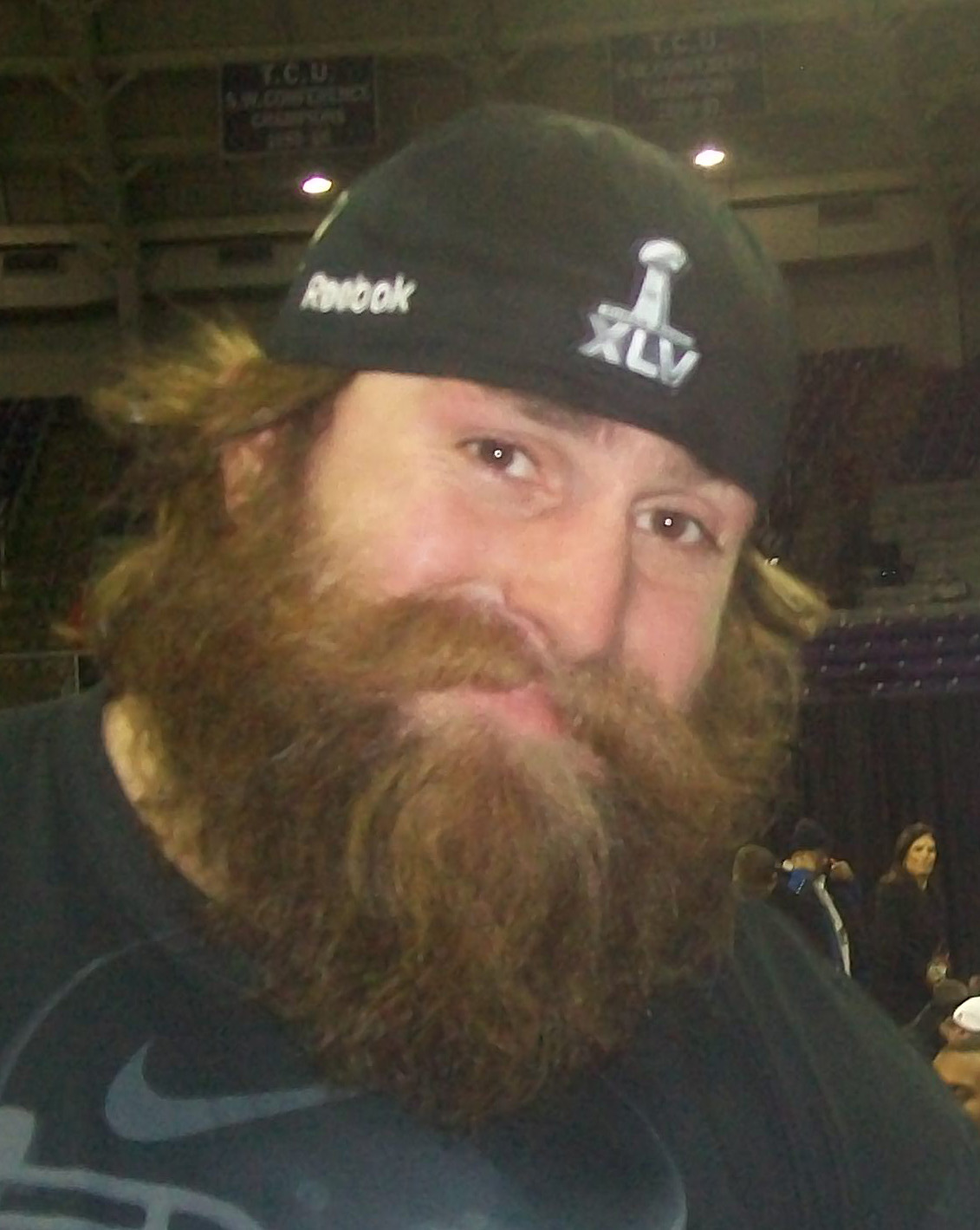
Keisel before Super Bowl XLV

In 2010, Keisel had his first career interception and first career touchdown in week 3 against the Tampa Bay Buccaneers, when he intercepted a pass thrown by Josh Freeman and returned it 79 yards for a touchdown. At the end of the 2010 season, Keisel and the Steelers appeared in Super Bowl XLV against the Green Bay Packers. He was a starter in the game and recorded three total tackles in the 31–25 loss. Keisel was also added to the AFC Pro Bowl roster for the first time in his career.

During the 2012 season, Keisel made 4.5 sacks and recovered a fumble. In addition, he had two forced fumbles in games against the New England Patriots and division opponents Cleveland Browns. In 2013, he recorded 20 solo tackles, nine assisted, 4.0 sacks and two fumble recoveries in 12 appearances. The team went 8-8, missing the playoffs.

In 2014, following the expiration of his 2009 contract, Keisel entered free agency. While agent Eric Metz stated that Keisel "has every intention to continue to play football," no contract had yet been offered by the Steelers organization. On August 19, 2014, Keisel agreed to re-sign with the Steelers, signing a 2-year contract worth $3 million, including a $500,000 signing bonus. In 2014, Keisel finished the season appearing in 12 games and recording eight solo tackles, nine assists, a single sack and an interception. This would prove to be Keisel's final season with the Steelers as he was released by the team on March 9, 2015.

In June 2015, Keisel announced his retirement.

== NFL career statistics ==
Legend
	Won the Super Bowl
**Bold**	Career high

=== Regular season ===
Year	Team	Games		Tackles					Interceptions					Fumbles			
Year	Team	GP	GS	Cmb	Solo	Ast	Sck	TFL	Int	Yds	TD	Lng	PD	FF	FR	Yds	TD
2002	PIT	5	0	4	3	1	0.0	0	0	0	0	0	0	0	1	0	0
2004	PIT	13	0	9	5	4	0.0	0	0	0	0	0	0	0	0	0	0
2005	PIT	16	0	33	23	10	3.0	2	0	0	0	0	2	1	1	0	0
2006	PIT	16	16	**56**	**38**	18	**5.5**	**6**	0	0	0	0	4	0	1	**1**	0
2007	PIT	16	16	38	22	16	2.0	2	0	0	0	0	6	0	0	0	0
2008	PIT	10	10	41	22	19	1.0	5	0	0	0	0	2	0	0	0	0
2009	PIT	15	15	54	36	18	3.0	4	0	0	0	0	2	1	**2**	0	0
2010	PIT	11	11	33	17	16	3.0	1	**1**	**79**	**1**	**79**	**7**	**2**	0	0	0
2011	PIT	14	14	48	33	15	3.0	5	0	0	0	0	6	**2**	1	0	0
2012	PIT	16	16	46	26	**20**	4.5	4	0	0	0	0	1	0	1	0	0
2013	PIT	12	12	29	20	9	4.0	3	0	0	0	0	1	1	**2**	**1**	0
2014	PIT	12	4	17	8	9	1.0	1	**1**	16	0	16	5	0	0	0	0
		156	114	408	253	155	30.0	33	2	95	1	79	36	7	9	2	0

=== Playoffs ===
Year	Team	Games		Tackles					Interceptions					Fumbles			
Year	Team	GP	GS	Cmb	Solo	Ast	Sck	TFL	Int	Yds	TD	Lng	PD	FF	FR	Yds	TD
2002	PIT	2	0	1	0	1	0.0	0	0	0	0	0	0	0	0	0	0
2004	PIT	2	0	1	1	0	0.0	0	0	0	0	0	0	0	0	0	0
2005	PIT	4	0	9	**8**	1	**2.0**	**2**	0	0	0	0	0	**1**	0	0	0
2007	PIT	1	1	7	2	5	0.0	1	0	0	0	0	**1**	0	0	0	0
2008	PIT	3	3	9	7	2	1.0	**2**	0	0	0	0	**1**	0	**1**	0	0
2010	PIT	3	3	**14**	6	**8**	0.0	1	0	0	0	0	**1**	0	**1**	0	0
2011	PIT	1	1	0	0	0	0.0	0	0	0	0	0	0	0	0	0	0
		16	8	41	24	17	3.0	6	0	0	0	0	3	1	2	0	0

== Personal life ==
Keisel lettered four times in football and basketball and twice in track at Greybull High School in Greybull, Wyoming. He was a four-time All-Conference selection and earned All-State honors as a tight end and linebacker (1995–96), was the USA Today Wyoming Player of the Year in his final season, and earned Sportslink Player of the Year and Conference Player of the Year honors in 1996.

Keisel excelled at both football and basketball and initially wanted to go to college for basketball. He researched the statistics of players that were in the NBA at the time and found that his size wouldn't compare to those playing basketball at the professional level. He then turned his attention and athletic ability to football.

He is the son of Connie and Lane Keisel. He has three sisters: Peggy, Kalli, and Codi; and four brothers: Tom, Lance, Chris, and Chad. He is married to his high school sweetheart, Sarah. The couple have three children.

Since retirement from football, Brett and his wife Sarah have been involved with numerous charitable organizations, including the Cystic Fibrosis Foundation.

In 2018, Keisel was a pallbearer at the funeral of brothers Cecil and David Rosenthal, who were killed in the Pittsburgh synagogue shooting. Their sister, Michele Rosenthal, was the former head of public relations for the Pittsburgh Steelers.

=== "Da Beard" ===
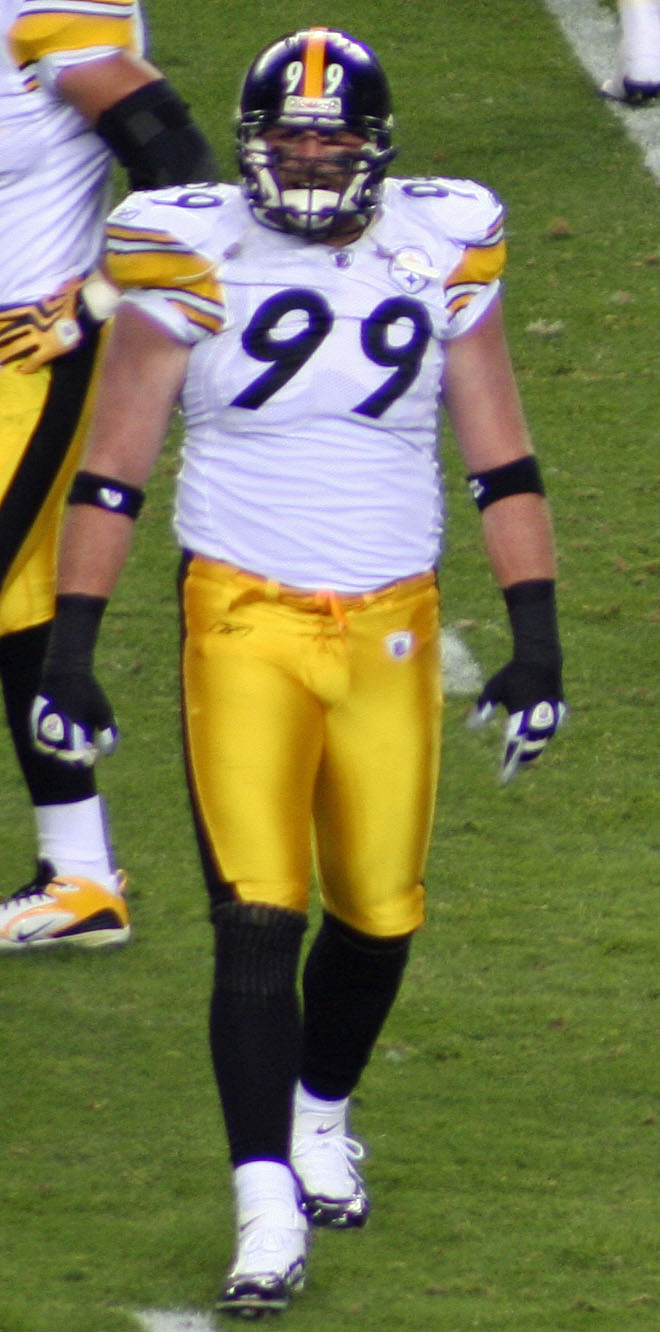
Keisel in 2009

Keisel began growing "Da Beard" while on a summertime hunting trip with his father. Keisel's facial hair gained fame during the end of the 2010 NFL season. Many NFL players grow "rally beards" during the playoffs to bring them good luck. His beard has its own Facebook page and Twitter account and was mentioned repeatedly in the media during the Steelers' playoff run.

In an interview on Steelers.com, Keisel explained that he had decided to grow out his beard after having a discussion about the lack of characters in the NFL. In another interview, though, to the Pittsburgh Post-Gazette, he said he wanted to change the team's luck, because it missed the playoffs the previous season. On July 27, 2022, as a guest on Steelers' Defensive Linemen Cam Hewyard's "Not Just Football" Podcast, Keisel said that he started growing it partly due to superstition. He followed up saying that the Pittsburgh Penguins had just recently won the Stanley Cup, and that he saw the playoff beards the players grew, and was a fan of them, and wanted to try it out.

Keisel refers to his beard as a "beautiful thing" and "the greatest beard of all time" and has, encouraged other Steelers to grow beards as well. After the Super Bowl several videos were made about Keisel's beard, including one that portrayed him as a Hasidic Jew.

On February 24, 2011, "Da Beard" was removed during a ceremony titled "Shear the Beard" in downtown Pittsburgh. The event raised over $40,000 for the Children's Hospital of Pittsburgh of UPMC. Keisel stated that "Da Beard" would most likely return for the upcoming season. "Da Beard will decide when the time is right to come back," he said, "and it will all of a sudden appear." Keisel dubbed the 2011 season "Da Beard Revenge Tour". On February 9, 2012, Keisel held "The Second Annual Shear the Beard Event." Just as in the previous year, proceeds raised went to the Children's Hospital of Pittsburgh. It was announced on January 8, 2013, that "The Third Annual Shear the Beard Event" would be held on February 7, 2013, at Jergel's Rhythm Grille in Warrendale, PA, with all proceeds benefiting the cancer program at Children's Hospital. It was announced on January 14, 2014, that "The Fourth Annual Shear the Beard Event" would be held on February 5, 2014, at Jergel's Rhythm Grille in Warrendale, PA, with all proceeds benefiting the cancer program at Children's Hospital. Shear Da Beard recently celebrated its tenth and final year. Shavers such as Ben Roethlisberger, James Harrison, Cameron Heyward, and Arthur Moats have taken part in the shaving of Keisel's beard. Cancer survivor Sean Nolan has even joined in on the festivities.
