= Big Horn County School District Number 3 =

School district in Wyoming, United States

Big Horn County School District #3

Location
- Big Horn County

District information
- Type: Public
- Grades: K-12
- Superintendent: Dr. Barry R. Bryant

Students and staff
- Students: 545

Other information
- Website: www.greybullschools.com

Big Horn County School District #3 is a public school district based in Greybull, Wyoming, United States.

== Geography ==
Big Horn County School District #3 serves central and east central portions of Big Horn County, including the following communities:

- Incorporated places
  - Town of Greybull
- Unincorporated places
  - Emblem
  - Shell

== Schools ==
- Greybull High School (Grades 9–12)
- Greybull Middle School (Grades 6–8)
- Greybull Elementary School (Grades K-5)

== Student demographics ==
The following figures are as of October 1, 2009.

- Total District Enrollment: 498
- Student enrollment by gender
  - Male: 252 (50.60%)
  - Female: 246 (49.40%)
- Student enrollment by ethnicity
  - American Indian or Alaska Native: 1 (0.20%)
  - Asian: 1 (0.20%)
  - Black or African American: 1 (0.20%)
  - Hispanic or Latino: 100 (20.08%)
  - Two or More Races: 3 (0.60%)
  - White: 392 (78.71%)

== See also ==
- List of school districts in Wyoming
