= Greybull, Wyoming =

- Town
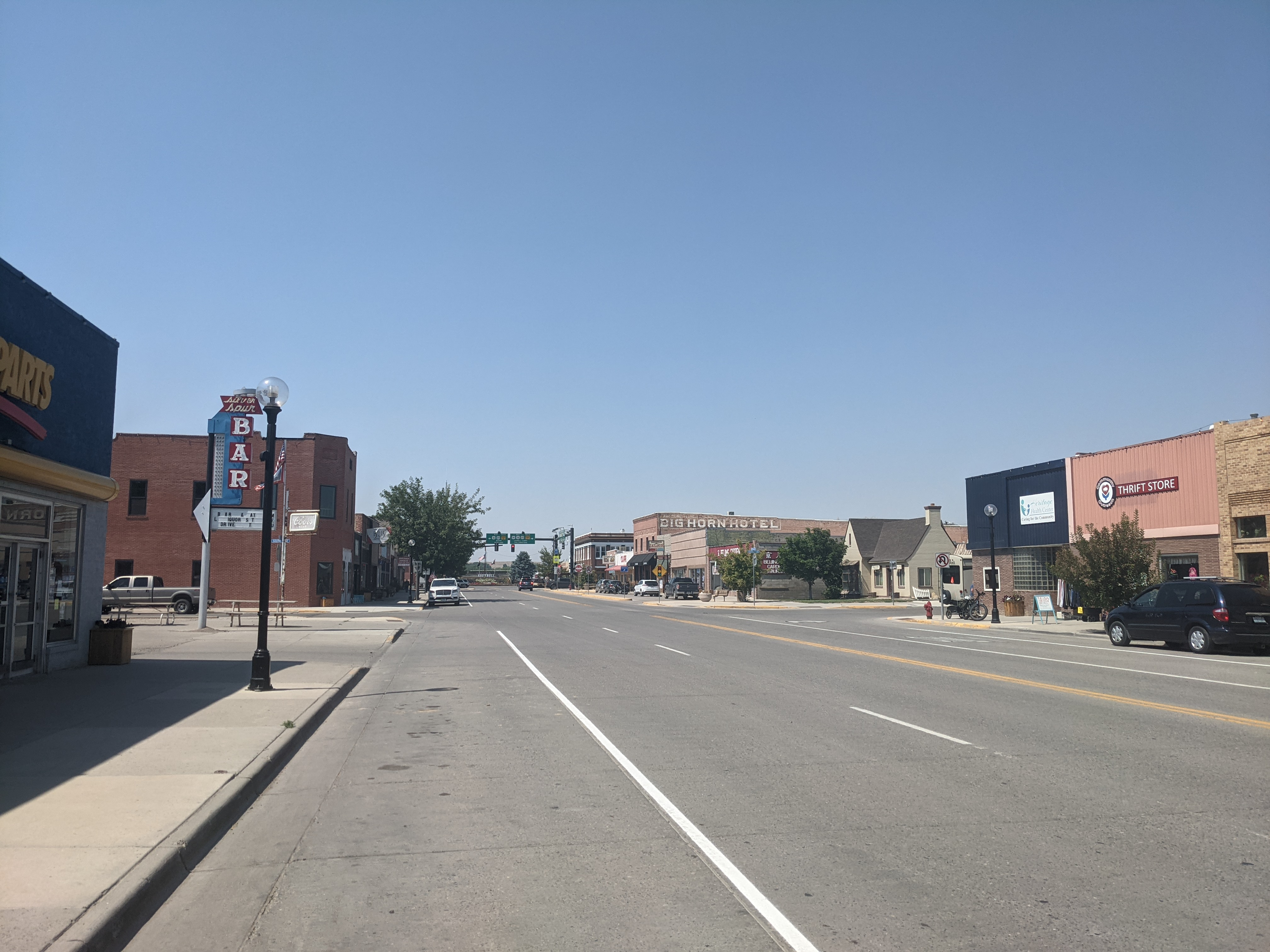
- Greybull Avenue in Greybull, Wyoming

- Location of Greybull in Big Horn County, Wyoming
- Coordinates: 44°29′42″N 108°03′24″W
- Country: United States
- State: Wyoming
- County: Big Horn

Government
  - Type: Mayor-Council government

Area
  - Total: 1.90 sq mi (4.91 km^{2})
  - Land: 1.89 sq mi (4.89 km^{2})
  - Water: 0.0077 sq mi (0.02 km^{2})
- Elevation: 3,796 ft (1,157 m)

Population (2020)
  - Total: 1,651
  - Density: 973.2/sq mi (375.74/km^{2})
- Time zone: UTC-7 (Mountain (MST))
  - Summer (DST): UTC-6 (MDT)
- ZIP code: 82426
- Area code: 307
- FIPS code: 56-33885
- GNIS feature ID: 2412710
- Website: townofgreybull.com

Greybull is a town in central Big Horn County, Wyoming, United States. The population was 1,651 at the 2020 census.

The town takes its name from the Greybull River which was named for a gray buffalo seen along its banks.

== Geography ==
According to the United States Census Bureau, the town has a total area of 1.83 square miles (4.74 km^{2}), of which 1.82 square miles (4.71 km^{2}) is land and 0.01 square miles (0.03 km^{2}) is water.

== Climate ==
According to the Köppen Climate Classification system, Greybull has a cold semi-arid climate, abbreviated "BSk" on climate maps. The hottest temperature recorded in Greybull was 109 °F (43 °C) on June 30, 2010, and July 17, 2010, while the coldest temperature recorded was −39 °F (−39 °C) on February 2, 1996.

Climate data for Greybull, Wyoming, 1991–2020 normals, extremes 1976–2019
Month	Jan	Feb	Mar	Apr	May	Jun	Jul	Aug	Sep	Oct	Nov	Dec	Year
Record high °F (°C)	55 (13)	66 (19)	81 (27)	90 (32)	96 (36)	109 (43)	109 (43)	107 (42)	99 (37)	92 (33)	74 (23)	69 (21)	109 (43)
Mean maximum °F (°C)	48.6 (9.2)	55.2 (12.9)	70.6 (21.4)	81.1 (27.3)	87.1 (30.6)	95.2 (35.1)	101.0 (38.3)	98.4 (36.9)	93.2 (34.0)	81.7 (27.6)	60.9 (16.1)	51.3 (10.7)	101.3 (38.5)
Mean daily maximum °F (°C)	29.9 (−1.2)	36.8 (2.7)	51.8 (11.0)	60.9 (16.1)	70.8 (21.6)	81.3 (27.4)	90.6 (32.6)	88.3 (31.3)	76.9 (24.9)	61.1 (16.2)	44.9 (7.2)	31.6 (−0.2)	60.4 (15.8)
Daily mean °F (°C)	16.2 (−8.8)	22.8 (−5.1)	36.6 (2.6)	46.0 (7.8)	56.1 (13.4)	65.5 (18.6)	72.9 (22.7)	70.2 (21.2)	59.5 (15.3)	45.5 (7.5)	30.6 (−0.8)	18.6 (−7.4)	45.0 (7.3)
Mean daily minimum °F (°C)	2.4 (−16.4)	8.9 (−12.8)	21.4 (−5.9)	31.2 (−0.4)	41.3 (5.2)	49.8 (9.9)	55.2 (12.9)	52.2 (11.2)	42.1 (5.6)	29.9 (−1.2)	16.2 (−8.8)	5.5 (−14.7)	29.7 (−1.3)
Mean minimum °F (°C)	−18.2 (−27.9)	−10.6 (−23.7)	3.6 (−15.8)	18.8 (−7.3)	28.7 (−1.8)	38.8 (3.8)	47.6 (8.7)	42.6 (5.9)	29.4 (−1.4)	14.1 (−9.9)	−3.0 (−19.4)	−8.1 (−22.3)	−22.3 (−30.2)
Record low °F (°C)	−36 (−38)	−39 (−39)	−23 (−31)	6 (−14)	19 (−7)	33 (1)	39 (4)	33 (1)	4 (−16)	−4 (−20)	−23 (−31)	−37 (−38)	−39 (−39)
Average precipitation inches (mm)	0.30 (7.6)	0.41 (10)	0.19 (4.8)	0.58 (15)	1.37 (35)	1.16 (29)	0.47 (12)	0.33 (8.4)	0.99 (25)	0.75 (19)	0.43 (11)	0.20 (5.1)	7.18 (181.9)
Average snowfall inches (cm)	3.3 (8.4)	6.2 (16)	1.6 (4.1)	0.6 (1.5)	0.2 (0.51)	0.0 (0.0)	0.0 (0.0)	0.0 (0.0)	0.2 (0.51)	0.7 (1.8)	2.2 (5.6)	4.2 (11)	19.2 (49.42)
Average precipitation days (≥ 0.01 in)	3.1	3.0	2.6	4.4	6.7	6.4	4.2	3.4	4.1	3.1	3.2	2.5	46.7
Average snowy days (≥ 0.1 in)	3.4	2.8	1.4	0.4	0.1	0.0	0.0	0.0	0.0	0.5	1.9	2.5	13.0
Source 1: NOAA
Source 2: National Weather Service (mean maxima and minima 1991–2005)

== Demographics ==
Historical population
Census	Pop.	Note	%±
1910	258		—
1920	2,692		943.4%
1930	1,806		−32.9%
1940	1,828		1.2%
1950	2,262		23.7%
1960	2,286		1.1%
1970	1,953		−14.6%
1980	2,277		16.6%
1990	1,789		−21.4%
2000	1,815		1.5%
2010	1,847		1.8%
2020	1,651		−10.6%
2023 (est.)	1,709	▲	3.5%
U.S. Decennial Census

=== 2010 census ===
As of the census of 2010, there were 1,847 people, 778 households, and 488 families living in the town. The population density was 1,014.8 inhabitants per square mile (391.8/km^{2}). There were 879 housing units at an average density of 483.0 units per square mile (186.5 units/km^{2}). The racial makeup of the town was 92.9% White, 0.4% African American, 1.1% Native American, 0.2% Asian, 0.1% Pacific Islander, 4.5% from other races, and 0.9% from two or more races. Hispanic or Latino people of any race were 10.7% of the population.

There were 778 households, of which 31.5% had children under the age of 18 living with them, 50.5% were married couples living together, 7.5% had a female householder with no husband present, 4.8% had a male householder with no wife present, and 37.3% were non-families. 31.9% of all households were made up of individuals, and 12.6% had someone living alone who was 65 years of age or older. The average household size was 2.37 and the average family size was 3.02.

The median age in the town was 40.1 years. 25.5% of residents were under the age of 18; 7% were between the ages of 18 and 24; 23.3% were from 25 to 44; 28.9% were from 45 to 64; and 15.3% were 65 years of age or older. The gender makeup of the town was 50.9% male and 49.1% female.

=== 2000 census ===
As of the census of 2000, there were 1,815 people, 781 households, and 500 families living in the town. The population density was 1,018.4 people per square mile (393.2 people/km^{2}). There were 923 housing units at an average density of 517.9 units per square mile (200.0 units/km^{2}). The racial makeup of the town was 96.20% White, 0.11% African American, 0.83% Native American, 0.39% Asian, 1.32% from other races, and 1.16% from two or more races. Hispanic or Latino people of any race were 4.74% of the population.

There were 781 households, out of which 28.6% had children under the age of 18 living with them, 51.7% were married couples living together, 7.6% had a female householder with no husband present, and 35.9% were non-families. 32.0% of all households were made up of individuals, and 14.5% had someone living alone who was 65 years of age or older. The average household size was 2.32 and the average family size was 2.92.

In the town, the population was spread out, with 26.6% under the age of 18, 7.3% from 18 to 24, 23.5% from 25 to 44, 25.6% from 45 to 64, and 17.1% who were 65 years of age or older. The median age was 40 years. For every 100 females, there were 96.2 males. For every 100 females age 18 and over, there were 95.5 males.

The median income for a household in the town was $29,674, and the median income for a family was $36,964. Males had a median income of $29,063 versus $17,500 for females. The per capita income for the town was $15,383. About 12.0% of families and 14.7% of the population were below the poverty line, including 22.1% of those under age 18 and 12.5% of those age 65 or over.

== Government ==
Greybull has a mayor and town council. In 2026, the mayor was Myles Foley.

== Arts and culture ==
The town celebrates the Days of '49 the second week of June from Thursday through Sunday. The first event was in 1945. It features a rodeo, parade, car show, and other activities. The name comes from the 1849 gold rush.

The Museum of Flight and Aerial Firefighting located at the local South Big Horn County Airport showcases several different kinds of aircraft used for aerial firefighting. The Greybull Museum features exhibits related to local history and local archaeology and paleontology.

There is a town owned swimming pool. A disk golf course is located at East Bridge Landing Park.

Greybull has a public library, a branch of the Big Horn County Library System.

== Education ==
Public education in the town of Greybull is provided by Big Horn County School District #3. The district has three campuses – Greybull Elementary School (grades K-5), Greybull Middle School (grades 6–8), and Greybull High School (grades 9–12).

== Transportation ==
=== Transit ===
Intercity bus service to the town is provided by Express Arrow.

=== Airport ===
South Big Horn County Airport
- IATA: GEY; ICAO: KGEY; FAA LID: GEY

Summary
- Airport type: Private
- Owner: Big Horn County
- Location: Greybull, Wyoming
- Elevation AMSL: 3,941 ft (1,201 m)
- Coordinates: 44°31′05″N 108°04′59″W
- Interactive map of South Big Horn County Airport

Runways
Direction	Length		Surface
Direction	ft	m	Surface
16/34	7,003	2,135	Asphalt
8/26	3,953	1,205	Asphalt

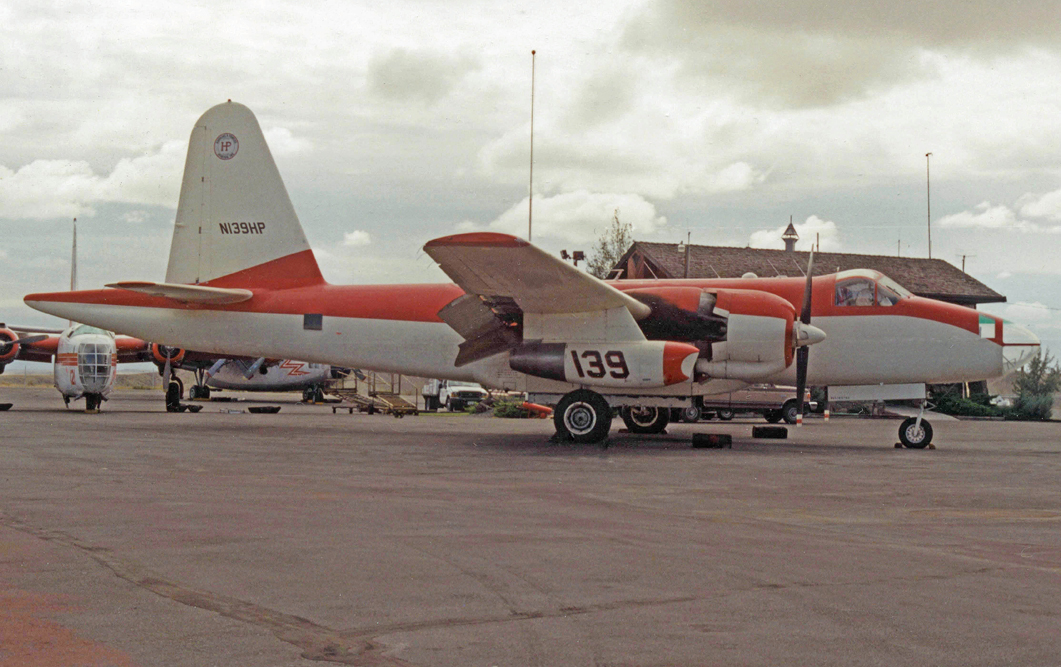
Fire-fighting Lockheed Neptune aircraft of Hawkins & Powers based at South Big Horn County Airport

The town is served by the nearby South Big Horn County Airport (IATA: GEY, ICAO: KGEY, FAA LID: GEY) used for General Aviation operations but which was the base for air tankers operating in the forest firefighting role, for many years flown by a local firm, Hawkins & Powers Aviation.

Christler-Avery Aviation was founded by Mel Christler and Morris Avery in 1951 offering aerial spraying operating Douglas B-18 Bolo, North American B-25 Mitchell, Northrop Delta aircraft. Mel Christler transferred to Thermopolis in 1961 and sold his share in the company to Avery.

Avery Aviation was founded by Morris Avery in 1961 building a hangar and developing the airport facilities. The company operated Bell 47, Cessna 195, Consolidated PB4Y-2 Privateer and at Avery's death was sold to the pilots.

Hawkins and Powers Aviation was founded by Dan Hawkins and Gene Powers in 1969 (57 years ago), after acquiring the assets of Avery Aviation. The company operated: Boeing C-97 Stratofreighter, Consolidated PB4Y-2 Privateer, Fairchild C-82 Packet, Fairchild C-119 Flying Boxcar, Lockheed C-130 Hercules and Lockheed P-2 Neptune all in the aerial firefighting role. The company declared bankruptcy in 2005 (21 years ago) after a series of fatal accidents.

Sixteen of the former firefighting aircraft were put up for auction in 2025.

== Media ==
The local newspaper is the Greybull Standard.

KZMQ-FM and KZMQ (AM) are radio stations licensed to Greybull.

== Notable people ==
- Wilford Brimley (1934–2020), actor
- Jim Crawford (1935–2018), football player for the New England Patriots
- Brett Keisel (born 1978), former defensive end for the Pittsburgh Steelers
- Bill Wilkinson (born 1964), former pitcher for the Seattle Mariners
- Tom Wilkinson (born 1943), quarterback for teams in the Canadian Football League

== See also ==
- List of municipalities in Wyoming
