= KPOW (AM) =

- Powell, Wyoming; United States
- Frequency: 1260 kHz

Programming
- Format: Talk and country music
- Affiliations: Compass Media Networks; Premiere Networks; USA Radio News; Westwood One

Ownership
- Owner: MGR Media, LLC

History
- First air date: May 1, 1941
- Call sign meaning: Powell

Technical information
- Licensing authority: FCC
- Facility ID: 10337
- Class: B
- Power: 5,000 watts (day); 1,000 watts (night)
- Transmitter coordinates: 44°42′0″N 108°46′0″W

Links
- Public license information: Public file; LMS
- Website: www.kpow1260.com

KPOW (1260 AM) is a commercial radio station licensed to Powell, Wyoming, United States. The station is owned by MGR Media LLC, and carries a local program in the morning, syndicated programming during the midday and country music in the evenings and weekends.

The studios and offices are located south of town at 912 Lane 11 1/2. The two tower transmitter site is on Lane 13.

According to FCC Ownership reports, MGR Media is part of Chaparral Broadcasting, which is 100% owned by Jerrold T. Lundquist of Westport, Connecticut.
