= Greybull High School =

Coordinates: 44°29′47″N 108°03′21″W

Location
- 600 North 6th Street; Greybull, Wyoming 82426; United States

Information
- Type: Public high school
- School district: Big Horn County School District #3
- Teaching staff: 14.95 (FTE)
- Grades: 9-12
- Enrollment: 136 (2024–2025)
- Student to teacher ratio: 9.10
- Colors: Blue and gold
- Mascot: Buffalo
- Website: www.greybullschools.com

Greybull High School is a public high school in Greybull, Wyoming, United States. It is part of Big Horn County School District #3 and serves students in grades 9–12. The school's mascot is the Buffalos, or "Buffs."

== Notable alumni ==
- Brett Keisel, former Pittsburgh Steelers defensive end
