= Cody High School (Wyoming) =

High school in Cody, Wyoming

Coordinates: 44°31′26″N 109°04′08″W

Location
- 1225 10th Cody, Park County, Wyoming 82414; United States

Information
- School district: Park County School District #6
- Principal: Mitchell Espeland
- Grades: 9–12
- Colors: Blue and gold
- Mascot: Broncs and Fillies
- Rival: Powell High School Panthers
- Website: chs.park6.org/o/chs

Cody High School is a secondary school in Cody, Wyoming, United States. It is part of Park County School District #6. Cody has a student population of approximately 600 students. The school's mascots are the broncs and fillies, and the colors are blue and gold. The school is the long-time rival of Powell High School.
