= KBEN-FM =

- Cowley, Wyoming; United States
- Broadcast area: Bighorn Basin
- Frequency: 103.3 MHz
- Branding: 103.3 The Range

Programming
- Format: Classic country

Ownership
- Owner: Heart Mountain Broadcasting, LLC.
- Sister stations: KROW, KWHO

Technical information
- Licensing authority: FCC
- Facility ID: 165998
- Class: C0
- ERP: 100,000 watts
- HAAT: 427 meters (1,401 ft)
- Transmitter coordinates: 44°34′13″N 108°49′9″W

Links
- Public license information: Public file; LMS
- Website: myheartmountainradio.com/the-range

KBEN-FM (103.3 FM) is a radio station broadcasting a classic country format. Licensed to Cowley, Wyoming, United States, and serving the Big Horn Basin, the station is owned by Heart Mountain Broadcasting, LLC. The cluster includes sister stations KROW (Cody) and KWHO (Lovell).

Under its current ownership, the station provides a high-power FM signal to rural communities that were historically underserved by regional broadcasts. In 2024, Heart Mountain Broadcasting completed a transaction to acquire the station from Northeast Digital & Wireless.

Heart Mountain Broadcasting is an independent media company based in Powell, Wyoming, primarily serving the Bighorn Basin region. It is owned and operated by April Rodriguez, who has been a prominent figure in the local radio landscape since 2000.
