= Park County School District Number 6 =

School district in Wyoming, United States

Park County School District #6 is a public school district based in Cody, Wyoming, United States.

== Geography ==
Park County School District #6 serves central and southwestern portions of Park County, including the following communities:

- Incorporated places
  - City of Cody
- Unincorporated places
  - Wapiti

== Schools ==
Secondary schools

- Cody High School (Grades 9-12)
- Cody Middle School (Grades 6-8)

Elementary schools (Grades K-5)

- Eastside Elementary School
- Glenn Livingston Elementary School
- Sunset Elementary School
- Valley Elementary School
- Wapiti Elementary School

== Student demographics ==
The following figures are as of October 1, 2009.

- Total District Enrollment: 2,156
- Student enrollment by gender
  - Male: 1,065 (49.40%)
  - Female: 1,091 (50.60%)
- Student enrollment by ethnicity
  - American Indian or Alaska Native: 9 (0.42%)
  - Asian: 13 (0.60%)
  - Black or African American: 8 (0.37%)
  - Hispanic or Latino: 85 (3.94%)
  - Two or More Races: 12 (0.56%)
  - White: 2,029 (94.11%)

== See also ==
- List of school districts in Wyoming
