= KCGL =

Classic hits radio station in Powell, Wyoming

- Powell, Wyoming; United States
- Broadcast area: Cody, Wyoming
- Frequency: 104.1 MHz
- Branding: 104.1 The Eagle

Programming
- Format: Classic hits
- Affiliations: Westwood One

Ownership
- Owner: Legend Communications of Wyoming; (Big Horn Radio Network)
- Sister stations: KODI; KTAG; KZMQ; KZMQ-FM

History
- First air date: April 16, 2001
- Former call signs: KRYV (2001)
- Call sign meaning: Cody/Eagle

Technical information
- Licensing authority: FCC
- Facility ID: 43918
- Class: C
- ERP: 100,000 watts
- HAAT: 547 meters (1,795 ft)
- Transmitter coordinates: 44°29′42″N 109°9′10″W
- Repeater: 105.7 KVGL (Manderson)

Links
- Public license information: Public file; LMS
- Webcast: Listen live
- Website: mybighornbasin.com/kcgl-fm/

KCGL (104.1 FM, "The Eagle") is a radio station broadcasting a classic hits format. It is licensed to Powell, Wyoming, and serves the Cody area. The station is owned by the Big Horn Radio Network, a division of Legend Communications of Wyoming, and features programming from Westwood One. The Eagle changed its format from classic rock to classic hits on July 15, 2016, at 3 pm. The station is simulcast in the Worland area on 105.7 KVGL.

All five stations of the Big Horn Radio Network have their offices and studios located on Mountain View Drive in Cody. KCGL and KTAG share a transmitter site on Cedar Mountain off Highway 14, west of Cody.

== History ==
The station first signed on the air on April 16, 2001, under the call sign KRYV. The station changed its call sign shortly after launch, adopting KCGL on May 21, 2001. The call sign is interpreted as standing for "Cody Eagle", reflecting its popular branding, "104.1 The Eagle". The station initially aired a classic rock format upon its launch. It transitioned to a classic hits format on July 15, 2016, at 3:00 p.m. KCGL features syndicated programming from Westwood One.

KCGL is owned by Legend Communications of Wyoming, LLC, which is the state's largest chain of radio stations. The station is managed under the company's regional umbrella, the Big Horn Radio Network. Legend Communications operates over 20 stations and three FM translators across Wyoming communities including Cody, Worland, Sheridan, and Gillette.

The company was co-founded by W. Lawrence "Larry" Patrick, a media industry veteran with a long career spanning five decades, including roles as a broadcaster, consultant, and media broker. Patrick holds a Ph.D. degree in communications and management and a J.D. degree and has been involved in over $8 billion worth of media transactions throughout his career.
