= KWHO =

Radio station in Lovell, Wyoming

- Lovell, Wyoming; United States
- Broadcast area: Cody, Wyoming
- Frequency: 107.1 MHz
- Branding: 107.1 The Adventure

Programming
- Format: Classic rock
- Affiliations: Fox News Radio

Ownership
- Owner: White Park Broadcasting, Inc.
- Sister stations: KAZY, KROW, KTED, KWBB, KZQL

History
- First air date: 2008
- Former call signs: KROW (2005–2010)

Technical information
- Licensing authority: FCC
- Facility ID: 164288
- Class: C1
- ERP: 18,000 watts
- HAAT: 419 meters
- Transmitter coordinates: 44°34′13″N 108°49′9″W

Links
- Public license information: Public file; LMS
- Website: KWHO Online

KWHO (107.1 FM) is a radio station licensed to serve Lovell, Wyoming, United States. The station is owned by White Park Broadcasting, Inc., a subsidiary of Oregon Trail Broadcasting.

KWHO broadcasts a classic rock music format, and features programming from ABC Radio.

== History ==
This station received its original construction permit from the Federal Communications Commission on March 9, 2005. Initially assigned the call sign KROW by the FCC on April 8, 2005, the station underwent one modification and successfully addressed an informal objection during its construction phase. Subsequently, KROW received its license to cover from the FCC on March 21, 2008.

On January 28, 2010, KROW changed their call letters to KWHO. The former KWHO call letters were previously used by a radio station in Salt Lake City, Utah, now known as KKAT.

In May 2024, KWHO changed their format from adult hits to classic rock, still under the "107.1 The Adventure" branding.

== Construction permit ==
On March 23, 2009, KROW was granted a new construction permit authorizing the station to upgrade from class C3 to class C0, increase effective radiated power to 100,000 watts, increase the broadcast antenna's height above average terrain to 427 meters (1401 feet), and relocate its transmitter to the southwest at 44°34'13"N, 108°49'09"W, to better serve the larger market of Cody, Wyoming. The new transmitter and tower site is east of Highway 14A, between Cody and Powell. This permit expired on March 23, 2012.
