= Powell High School (Wyoming) =

Location
- 1151 East 7th Street; Powell, Wyoming 82435; United States
- Coordinates: 44°45′43″N 108°44′34″W

Information
- Type: Public high school
- School district: Park County School District Number 1
- Principal: Tim Wormald
- Teaching staff: 36.43 (FTE)
- Grades: 9-12
- Enrollment: 594 (2023-2024)
- Student to teacher ratio: 16.31
- Campus: Rural
- Colors: Orange and black
- Athletics conference: 3A West
- Nickname: Panthers
- Website: www.pcsd1.org/o/phs

Powell High School is a high school in Powell, in the northwest part of the U.S. state of Wyoming. The district is bordered by Montana on the north and Yellowstone Park on the west.

The school's mascot is the Panther. The school is in the 3A classification for Wyoming sports.

In the fall of 2008, after a $20 million reconstruction project, mice invaded the high school building and infested its classrooms.
