= KROW =

- Cody, Wyoming; United States
- Frequency: 101.1 MHz
- Branding: 101.1 The One

Programming
- Format: Contemporary Christian music

Ownership
- Owner: Heart Mountain Broadcasting, LLC.
- Sister stations: KHMN, KBEN-FM

History
- First air date: 2010; 16 years ago
- Former call signs: KWHO (2006–2010)
- Call sign meaning: "The KROW" (previous format)

Technical information
- Licensing authority: FCC
- Facility ID: 165999
- Class: C2
- ERP: 5,400 watts
- HAAT: 427 meters (1,401 ft)
- Transmitter coordinates: 44°34′13″N 108°49′9″W

Links
- Public license information: Public file; LMS
- Website: myheartmountainradio.com/the-one

KROW (101.1 FM, "The One") is an American radio station licensed to serve Cody, Wyoming. The station, established in 2010, is owned and operated by Heart Mountain Broadcasting, LLC. KROW broadcasts a contemporary Christian music radio format.

== History ==
In March 2006, White Park Broadcasting, Inc., applied to the Federal Communications Commission (FCC) for a construction permit for a new broadcast radio station. The FCC granted this permit on June 28, 2006, with a scheduled expiration date of June 28, 2009. The new station was assigned call sign "KWHO" on September 20, 2006.

The station's call sign was changed to "KROW" on January 28, 2010. These call letters were swapped with the sister station now known as "KWHO" (107.1 FM) in Lovell, Wyoming.

After overcoming filed objections and construction and testing were completed, the station was granted its broadcast license by the FCC on August 17, 2011.

In May 2024 KROW changed their format from active rock to contemporary Christian, branded as "101.1 The One".

=== Call letters ===
The call letters KROW were previously assigned to AM stations in Oakland, California (960 - White's Radio Log), Reno Nevada, Modesto, California and Dallas, Oregon.
