= KKLX =

Radio station in Worland, Wyoming

- Worland, Wyoming; United States
- Frequency: 96.1 MHz
- Branding: Klicks 96

Programming
- Format: Hot adult contemporary
- Affiliations: NBC Radio, Westwood One

Ownership
- Owner: Legend Communications of Wyoming, LLC; (Big Horn Radio Network)
- Sister stations: KVGL, KWOR

History
- First air date: December 1, 1980 (as KENB-FM)
- Former call signs: KENB-FM (1980–1987); KWOR-FM (1987–1989)
- Call sign meaning: "Clicks"

Technical information
- Licensing authority: FCC
- Facility ID: 35896
- Class: C1
- ERP: 63,000 watts
- HAAT: 175.6 meters
- Transmitter coordinates: 44°3′33.6″N 107°51′12.7″W

Links
- Public license information: Public file; LMS
- Website: KKLX Online

KKLX (96.1 FM) is a radio station broadcasting a hot adult contemporary format. Licensed to Worland, Wyoming, United States, the station is currently owned by the Big Horn Radio Network, a division of Legend Communications of Wyoming, LLC, and features programming from NBC News Radio, and Westwood One.

KWOR, KVGL and KKLX studios are located at 1340 Radio Drive, Worland. KKLX's transmitter site is on Rattlesnake Ridge Road, northeast of Worland.

== History ==
KENB-FM signed on December 1, 1980. It was owned by and named for Ken Brown, the original owner. The station operated under the call sign KWOR-FM for a time, specifically from 1987 to 1989. During the 1990s, the station broadcast a Country music format and was branded as "The Big Country".

KKLX-FM is owned by Legend Communications of Wyoming, LLC, which is the state's largest chain of radio stations. The station is managed under the company's regional umbrella, the Big Horn Radio Network. Legend Communications operates over 20 stations and three FM translators across Wyoming communities including Cody, Worland, Sheridan, and Gillette.

The company was co-founded by W. Lawrence "Larry" Patrick, a media industry veteran with a long career spanning five decades, including roles as a broadcaster, consultant, and media broker. Patrick holds a Ph.D. in communications and management and a J.D. in law and has been involved in over $8 billion worth of media transactions throughout his career.
