= KODI =

- Cody, Wyoming; United States
- Frequency: 1400 kHz

Programming
- Format: News/talk/sports
- Affiliations: AP Radio; Westwood One News; Fox Sports Radio

Ownership
- Owner: Legend Communications of Wyoming, LLC; (Big Horn Radio Network)
- Sister stations: KCGL, KTAG, KZMQ (AM), KZMQ-FM

History
- First air date: April 8, 1947
- Call sign meaning: CODY

Technical information
- Licensing authority: FCC
- Facility ID: 74351
- Class: C
- Power: 1,000 watts
- Transmitter coordinates: 44°30′46″N 109°03′20″W
- Translator: K244CG 96.7 (Cody)

Links
- Public license information: Public file; LMS
- Website: http://www.mybighornbasin.com

KODI (1400 AM) is a radio station broadcasting a news/talk format. Licensed to Cody, Wyoming, United States, the station is currently owned by the Big Horn Radio Network, a division of Legend Communications of Wyoming, LLC, and features programming from AP Radio, Fox Sports Radio and Westwood One News.

All five stations of the Big Horn Radio Network have their offices and studios located on Mountain View Drive in Cody. The KODI transmitter site is on Reservoir Drive, just west of the studios.

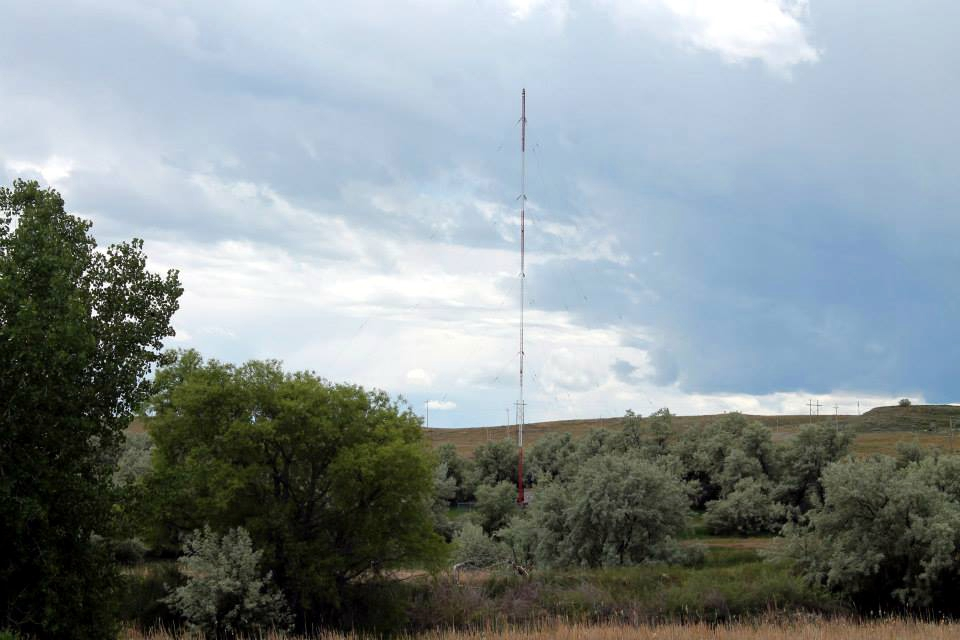
The tower of KODI near the studio.

== History ==
KODI signed on with an unofficial first air date of April 8, 1947, and its call sign stands for C-O-D-Y.

KODI is owned by Legend Communications of Wyoming, LLC, as part of the Big Horn Radio Network (also known as Big Horn Basin Media). The station is a key outlet for local and regional news, and hosts the long-running, local talk program, "Speak Your Piece."

In 2016, the station added of an FM translator on 96.7 MHz (K244CG), which broadcasts to Cody and the immediate surrounding area.

The station joined the Buffalo Bills Radio Network in 2024, after previous affiliate KGAB dropped the Bills. The Bills have a strong following in Wyoming due in part to Wyoming Cowboys football alumnus Josh Allen being the Bills' starting quarterback.

In 2023, and 2024, there was a restructure of Legend Communications from co-owner Susan Patrick to Larry Patrick, which was necessitated by legal proceedings involving tax fraud.
