= KTAG =

Radio station in Cody, Wyoming

- Cody, Wyoming; United States
- Broadcast area: Big Horn Basin
- Frequency: 97.9 MHz

Programming
- Format: Hot adult contemporary
- Affiliations: Westwood One

Ownership
- Owner: Legend Communications of Wyoming, LLC
- Sister stations: KCGL; KODI; KZMQ; KZMQ-FM

History
- First air date: November 30, 1981

Technical information
- Licensing authority: FCC
- Facility ID: 74354
- Class: C
- ERP: 100,000 watts
- HAAT: 576 meters
- Transmitter coordinates: 44°29′41.8″N 109°9′12.5″W

Links
- Public license information: Public file; LMS
- Website: mybighornbasin.com

KTAG (97.9 FM) is a radio station broadcasting a hot adult contemporary music format. It is licensed to Cody, Wyoming. The station is owned by the Big Horn Radio Network, a division of Legend Communications of Wyoming, LLC. It features local programming.

All five stations of the Big Horn Radio Network have their offices and studios located on Mountain View Drive in Cody. KCGL and KTAG use a transmitter site on Cedar Mountain off Highway 14, west of Cody.

KTAG first signed on the air on November 30, 1981.

The station features local programming and is also affiliated with the national syndicator Westwood One for some of its programming. KTAG serves the Big Horn Basin area of Wyoming.
