= KZMQ-FM =

- Greybull, Wyoming; United States
- Broadcast area: Cody, Wyoming
- Frequency: 100.3 MHz

Programming
- Format: Country
- Affiliations: Westwood One

Ownership
- Owner: Legend Communications of Wyoming, LLC; (Big Horn Radio Network)
- Sister stations: KCGL, KODI, KTAG, KZMQ (AM)

History
- First air date: February 21, 1986

Technical information
- Licensing authority: FCC
- Facility ID: 5248
- Class: C
- ERP: 56,000 watts
- HAAT: 745 meters
- Transmitter coordinates: 44°48′41″N 107°55′6″W

Links
- Public license information: Public file; LMS
- Website: mybighornbasin.com/kzmq-fm

KZMQ-FM (100.3 MHz) is a radio station broadcasting a country music format. Licensed to Greybull, Wyoming, United States, the station is currently owned by the Big Horn Radio Network, a division of Legend Communications of Wyoming, LLC. It features programming from Westwood One.

All five stations of the Big Horn Radio Network have their offices and studios located on Mountain View Drive in Cody. The KZMQ-FM transmitter site is on a mountain near US Highway 14A, east of Lovell, Wyoming.

Former logo

== Format and network ==
KZMQ-FM broadcasts a country music format. The station is affiliated with national syndicator Westwood One for some of its programming.

In April 2023, the parent company, formerly known as the Big Horn Radio Network, rebranded itself as Big Horn Basin Media to reflect an expanded emphasis on digital advertising and media services in the region. KZMQ-FM continues to be the flagship country station for the network.

== Technical information ==
The station is regulated by the Federal Communications Commission (FCC) and is listed under facility ID 5248. KZMQ-FM is classified as a Class C FM station, with its high power and height above average terrain (HAAT) of 745 metres (2,444 ft) allowing it to serve the Big Horn Basin area, including Cody.
