= KZMQ (AM) =

- Greybull, Wyoming; United States
- Broadcast area: Cody, Wyoming
- Frequency: 1140 kHz
- Branding: Good Time Oldies

Programming
- Format: Oldies
- Affiliations: Westwood One

Ownership
- Owner: Legend Communications of Wyoming, LLC; (Big Horn Radio Network)
- Sister stations: KCGL, KODI, KTAG, KZMQ-FM

History
- First air date: 1980

Technical information
- Licensing authority: FCC
- Facility ID: 5245
- Class: D
- Power: 10,000 watts (day)
- Transmitter coordinates: 44°27′01″N 108°02′56″W
- Translator: 92.9 K225CO (Greybull)

Links
- Public license information: Public file; LMS
- Website: www.mybighornbasin.com

KZMQ (1140 AM) is a radio station broadcasting an oldies music format to the Greybull, Wyoming, United States, area. The station is owned by the Big Horn Radio Network, a division of Legend Communications of Wyoming, LLC. It features programming from Westwood One.

All five stations of the Big Horn Radio Network have their offices and studios located on Mountain View Drive in Cody. The KZMQ transmitter site is on Highway 20, just south of Greybull.

== History ==
The station first broadcast from Greybull, Wyoming, under the call sign KMMZ in 1980. The original KMMZ facilities, which included both the studio and transmitter tower, were located on the junction of Highway 20 and Highway 16, serving the nearby communities of Greybull and Basin.

The station later adopted the KZMQ call sign and became part of the Big Horn Radio Network, which is owned by Legend Communications of Wyoming, LLC. Legend Communications, co-owned by Larry and Susan Patrick, is one of the largest media ownership groups in the state, operating more than 20 radio stations across Wyoming. Although the original tower site remains active in the Greybull area, KZMQ's primary studio operations have since relocated to Cody, Wyoming, where it shares facilities with its sister stations in the Big Horn Basin Media group. In April 2023, Legend Communications conducted a major corporate rebranding of the regional cluster. The "Big Horn Radio Network" name was officially retired and replaced with Big Horn Basin Media to signify the group's expanded focus on digital advertising and multi-platform media content. As part of this refresh, KZMQ-AM and its sister stations received updated branding and logos.

In February 2024, Susan Patrick, Larry's then-wife, was sentenced to 15 months in prison for willfully making and subscribing a false tax return by a Maryland federal judge. She was also ordered to pay approximately $3.84 million in restitution to the United States. This situation necessitated an urgent filing with the FCC to transfer her entire 50% stake in Legend Communications to her now ex-husband, Larry Patrick, for a token price of $1.00. This makes Larry Patrick the 100% equity holder, pending FCC approval.

KZMQ broadcasts an oldies music format, branded as "Good Time Oldies," and is part of the extensive network serving the Big Horn Basin region. In the spring of 2014, the format changed from classic country to oldies.

As of November, 2025, the station was silent.
