= National Register of Historic Places listings in Converse County, Wyoming =

Location of Converse County in Wyoming

This is a list of the National Register of Historic Places listings in Converse County, Wyoming.

This is intended to be a complete list of the properties and districts on the National Register of Historic Places in Converse County, Wyoming, United States. The locations of National Register properties and districts for which the latitude and longitude coordinates are included below, may be seen in a map.

There are 25 properties and districts listed on the National Register in the county.

This National Park Service list is complete through NPS recent listings posted August 7, 2026.

Contents: Counties in Wyoming
Albany - Big Horn - Campbell - Carbon - Converse - Crook - Fremont - Goshen - Hot Springs - Johnson - Laramie - Lincoln - Natrona - Niobrara - Park - Platte - Sheridan - Sublette - Sweetwater - Teton - Uinta - Washakie - Weston

== Current listings ==
	Name on the Register	Image	Date listed	Location	City or town	Description
1	Antelope Creek Crossing (48CO171 and 48CO165)		July 23, 1989 (#89000816)	Confluence of Antelope Creek and Spring Draw, east of Ross; 43°25′45″N 105°48′28″W	Ross	
2	Braehead Ranch		September 7, 1995 (#95001074)	69 Moss Agate Road; 42°39′59″N 105°39′34″W	Douglas	
3	Christ Episcopal Church and Rectory	Christ Episcopal Church and Rectory	November 17, 1980 (#80004046)	4th and Center Streets; 42°45′35″N 105°22′54″W	Douglas	
4	College Inn Bar	College Inn Bar	July 10, 1979 (#79002608)	103 North Second Street; 42°45′36″N 105°23′00″W	Douglas	
5	Commerce Block	Commerce Block	January 21, 2005 (#04001548)	4th and Birch Streets; 42°51′40″N 105°52′17″W	Glenrock	
6	Dorr Ranch		December 22, 2014 (#14001080)	Approximately 5 miles N.E. of Woody Creek & Steinle Roads; 43°23′15″N 105°10′56″W	Bill vicinity	
7	Douglas City Hall	Douglas City Hall	March 17, 1994 (#94000167)	130 South Third Street; 42°45′29″N 105°23′02″W	Douglas	
8	Fort Fetterman	Fort Fetterman	April 16, 1969 (#69000187)	7 miles north of Interstate 25 on Orpha Road; 42°50′36″N 105°29′07″W	Orpha	
9	Fremont, Elkhorn & Missouri Valley Railroad Passenger Depot	Fremont, Elkhorn & Missouri Valley Railroad Passenger Depot	August 3, 1994 (#94000741)	121 Brownfield Rd. 42°45′32″N 105°23′15″W	Douglas	
10	Glenrock Buffalo Jump		April 16, 1969 (#69000186)	Near the center of Section 11, Township 33 North, Range 76 West; 42°50′38″N 105°56′00″W	Glenrock	
11	Holdup Hollow Segment, Bozeman Trail (48CO165)		July 23, 1989 (#89000818)	In Holdup Hollow, north of Glenrock; 43°05′39″N 105°42′50″W	Glenrock	
12	Hotel Higgins	Hotel Higgins	November 25, 1983 (#83004280)	416 West Birch; 42°51′40″N 105°52′23″W	Glenrock	
13	Hotel LaBonte	Hotel LaBonte	October 10, 2008 (#08001003)	206 Walnut Street; 42°45′40″N 105°23′06″W	Douglas	
14	Huxtable Ranch Headquarters District		April 7, 2011 (#10001172)	1351 Boxelder Road; 42°40′06″N 105°48′15″W	Glenrock	Ranches, Farms, and Homesteads in Wyoming, 1860-1960 MPS
15	Jenne Block	Jenne Block	January 6, 1998 (#97001600)	301 Center Street; 42°45′33″N 105°22′59″W	Douglas	
16	La Prele Work Center		April 11, 1994 (#94000272)	Southwest of Douglas, Medicine Bow National Forest; 42°27′29″N 105°50′02″W	Douglas	
17	Morton Mansion	Morton Mansion	January 11, 2001 (#00001644)	425 Center Street; 42°45′33″N 105°22′51″W	Douglas	
18	North Douglas Historic District	North Douglas Historic District	November 25, 2002 (#00001470)	Roughly bounded by 2nd St., Clay St., 6th St., and Center St. 42°45′45″N 105°22′54″W	Douglas	
19	Officer's Club, Douglas Prisoner of War Camp	Officer's Club, Douglas Prisoner of War Camp	September 8, 2001 (#01000965)	115 South Riverbend Drive; 42°45′31″N 105°24′22″W	Douglas	
20	Old Douglas Armory		March 28, 2022 (#100007532)	400 West Center St. 42°45′35″N 105°23′25″W	Douglas	
21	Ross Flat Segment, Bozeman Trail (48CO165)		July 23, 1989 (#89000811)	Ends at Ross Flat, northwest of Ross; 43°29′26″N 105°49′49″W	Ross	
22	Sage Creek Station (48CO104)		July 23, 1989 (#89000812)	Address restricted	Glenrock	
23	South Douglas Residential Historic District		May 24, 2023 (#100008516)	Bounded by Elm, Erwin, west side of South 4th, and east side of South 6th Sts. 42°45′15″N 105°22′53″W	Douglas	
24	Stinking Water Gulch Segment, Bozeman Trail (48CO165)		July 23, 1989 (#89000817)	Along Stinking Water Gulch, southeast of Ross; 43°19′38″N 105°41′12″W	Ross	
25	US Post Office-Douglas Main	US Post Office-Douglas Main	May 19, 1987 (#87000781)	129 North Third Street; 42°45′38″N 105°22′59″W	Douglas	

== See also ==
- List of National Historic Landmarks in Wyoming
- National Register of Historic Places listings in Wyoming
