= Wyoming Highway 90 =

State highway in Wyoming, United States

Wyoming Highway 90
- Boxelder Road
- WYO 90 highlighted in red

Route information
- Maintained by WYDOT
- Length: 3 mi (4.8 km)

Major junctions
- South end: CR 17 near Glenrock
- North end: I-25 BL / US 20 / US 26 / US 87 near Glenrock

Location
- Country: United States
- State: Wyoming
- Counties: Converse

Highway system
- Wyoming State Highway System; Interstate; US; State
← I-90	→ WYO 91

Wyoming Highway 90 (WYO 90) is a 3-mile (4.8 km) long north–south Wyoming state highway located in western Converse County southeast of Glenrock. The highway is locally known as Boxelder Road.

== Route description ==
Wyoming Highway 90 is a fairly short state highway located south-southeast of Glenrock named Boxelder Road. Highway 90 begins southeast of Glenrock and north of the community of Boxelder, for which the roadway is named and provides travel to. Highway 90 picks up where Converse County Route 17 leaves off as the roadway begins south-southeast of Glenrock (Converse CR 17 continues south to Boxelder). Highway 90 heads north passing under Interstate 25, but with no interchange between the two highways. A mile after crossing I-25, Highway 90 reaches its northern terminus at I-25 Business / U.S. Routes 20, 26, and 87 in Glenrock.

== Major intersections ==
The entire route is in Converse County.

Location	mi	km	Destinations	Notes
	0	0.0	CR 17 south	Southern terminus
	3	4.8	I-25 BL / US 20 / US 26 / US 87 – Glenrock, Douglas	Northern terminus
1.000 mi = 1.609 km; 1.000 km = 0.621 mi
