= George Cross (disambiguation) =

The George Cross is a UK and commonwealth award for bravery.

George Cross may also refer to:

- George Cross (Malta), the award of the George Cross to the island of Malta
- Cross of St. George, a Russian gallantry award
- The Saint George's Cross, as a heraldic device and flag design
- Caroline Springs George Cross FC, association football club, Melbourne, Australia. Formerly known as George Cross and Sunshine George Cross.

== People named George Cross ==
- George Cross (actor) (c. 1873–1949), Australian actor and casting director
- George A. M. Cross (born 1942), British molecular parasitologist
- George Lynn Cross (1905–1998), American biologist and university president
- George W. Cross (1872–?), American politician, Missouri state representative
- W. George Cross (born 1932), politician in Newfoundland, Canada
- George H. Cross (1854–1946), member of the Wyoming Senate
