= Chicago and North Western Railway Passenger Depot =

Chicago and North Western Railway Passenger Depot may refer to:

- Chicago and North Western Railway Passenger Depot (Green Bay), listed on the National Register of Historic Places in Wisconsin
- Chicago and North Western Railway Passenger Depot in Douglas, Wyoming, listed on the NRHP in Wyoming
