= Wyoming Highway 95 =

State highway in Wyoming, United States

Wyoming Highway 95
- WYO 95 highlighted in red

Route information
- Maintained by WYDOT
- Length: 19.23 mi (30.95 km)

Western segment
- West end: I-25 / I-25 BL / CR 19 in Glenrock
- East end: I-25 BL / US 20 / US 26 / US 87 in Glenrock

Eastern segment
- West end: US 20 / US 26 / US 87 in Glenrock
- East end: WYO 93 near Carey

Location
- Country: United States
- State: Wyoming
- Counties: Converse

Highway system
- Wyoming State Highway System; Interstate; US; State
| ← WYO 94 | → WYO 96 |

Wyoming Highway 95 (WYO 95) is an overall east–west Wyoming State Road located in central Converse County and serves the towns of Glenrock, Rolling Hills, and areas northeast of those communities.

== Route description ==
Wyoming Highway 95 begins its western (or southwestern) end at exit 165 of Interstate 25 and the northern end of Converse County Route 19. WYO 95 travels from there northeasterly concurrent with I-25 BUS toward the town center of Glenrock as Deer Creek Road. WYO 95 passes the Glenrock Golf Course as it turns north and assumes the name S. 4th Street as it enters the town center. WYO 95 intersects US 20 / US 26 / US 87 (W. Birch Street) at 2.13-mile (3.4 km). I-25 Business heads south, following 20/26 east and 87 south. Wyoming 95 ends, not running concurrent with the US highways. WYO 95 resumes less than a mile west, just west of the Glenrock city limits. WYO 95 turns northeast and curves around the northern side of Glenrock, crossing the North Platte River, and continuing northeast as Monkey Mountain Road. The town of Rolling Hills is reached north-northeast of Glenrock. WYO 95 continues on its east-northeast track, named Glenrock-Ross Road east of Rolling Hills. WYO 95 turns north and back east again briefly near Carey before reaching its eastern terminus at Wyoming Highway 93 east of Carey.

== Major intersections ==
The entire route is in Converse County.

| Location | mi | km | Destinations | Notes |
|---|---|---|---|---|
| Glenrock | 0.00 | 0.00 | CR 19 (Deer Creek Road) I-25 / I-25 BL begins – Casper, Cheyenne | WYO 95 western terminus / I-25 BL northern terminus; west end of I-25 BL concurrency; I-25 exit 165 |
| Glenrock | 2.13 | 3.43 | I-25 BL east / US 20 / US 26 / US 87 – Douglas, Casper | East end of I-25 BL concurrency |
| Glenrock | Use US 20 / US 26 / US 87 to connect between segments | | | |
| Glenrock | 2.59 | 4.17 | US 20 / US 26 / US 87 – Glenrock, Casper | |
| | 19.23 | 30.95 | WYO 93 | WYO 95 eastern terminus |
1.000 mi = 1.609 km; 1.000 km = 0.621 mi: Concurrency terminus
