= Wyoming Pioneer Memorial Museum =

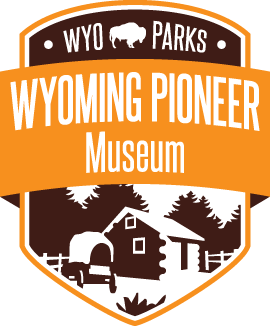

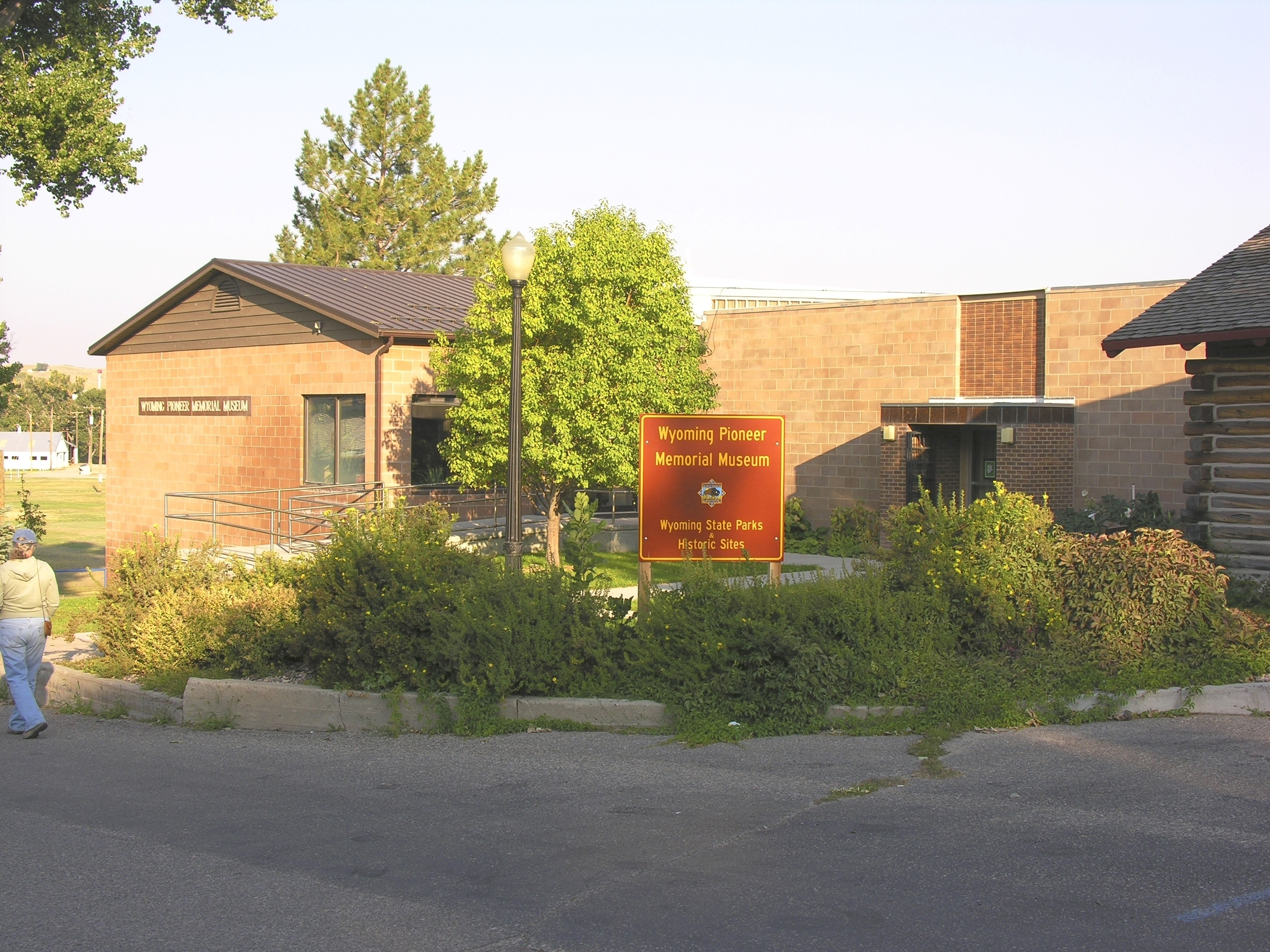
- A-21. Wyoming Pioneer Memorial Museum (400 W. Center, Douglas, WY) on the California, Mormon Pioneer, Oregon, and Pony Express National Historic Trails (2006)

- Location of the museum in Wyoming
- Established: 1956
- Location: 400 West Center Street; Douglas, Wyoming
- Coordinates: 42.7598°N 105.3904°W
- Type: Museum
- Owner: State of Wyoming
- Website: https://wyoparks.wyo.gov/index.php/places-to-go/wyoming-pioneer-museum

The Wyoming Pioneer Memorial Museum is a state-run museum established in 1956 in Douglas, Wyoming. It is located on the Wyoming State Fairgrounds.

== History ==
In 1926, the Wyoming Pioneer Association was incorporated. This organization's stated purpose was to preserve historical knowledge, artifacts and locations, as well as providing an outlet for long-time Wyoming residents or "pioneers" to share their experiences in bringing Wyoming into statehood A cabin was built to serve as a meeting place and museum on the Wyoming State Fairgrounds, but it was quickly outgrown by the increased attendance and number of artifact donations. By 1934, the Association reached out to the Wyoming state Legislature for funding for a "State Historical Exhibit."

In 1956, funds were approved for a permanent building to hold the Wyoming Pioneer Association's collection, with the facility being owned and operated by the Wyoming Department of Agriculture. In 1999, the Museum was transferred to the Wyoming Department of State Parks and Cultural Resources.

== Description ==
The museum focuses on the American frontier or "Old West" period, specifically the experiences of the pioneers who settled the area of what is now modern Wyoming. Exhibits relating to major events as the [Johnson County War] and the Lightning Creek and Heck Reel massacres are on display, as well as exhibits depicting the work, recreation, and domestic activities of early Wyoming settlers. Artifacts connected to the military service and wartime experiences of Wyomingites in the American Indian Wars, Spanish-American War, World War I and World War II are also on display, alongside a sizeable collection of weaponry. There is also an expansive collection of Native American artifacts.

The Museum is operated as a part of the Wyoming State Parks system.
