= Huxtable Ranch Headquarters District =

- U.S. National Register of Historic Places
- U.S. Historic district
- Location within Wyoming Location within the United States
- Nearest city: Glenrock, Wyoming
- Coordinates: 42°40′06″N 105°48′15″W
- MPS: Ranches, Farms and Homesteads in Wyoming, 1860-1960 MPS
- NRHP reference No.: 10001172
- Added to NRHP: April 17, 2011

The Huxtable Ranch Ranch Headquarters District, also known as White Creek Ranch, comprises a complex of ranch structures in Converse County, Wyoming. It was part of a dispersed community known as Boxelder, established by settlers in the 1880s. The ranch was established in 1893 by Charles Smith who built a one-room and later a three-room cabin on the property, as well as a barn. Three years later he sold the homestead to Willard Heber White. White and his wife lived on the ranch until 1928 when they moved to Douglas. On White's death in 1929, the ranch was purchased by Lloyd Huxtable and Charlie Olin. Lloyd and Olin built the present ranch house for Charlie and his wife Najima, Olin's sister, from 1933 to 1935. The Huxtables operated the ranch until his death at 86 in 1976. Huxtable served as a Converse County Commissioner from 1948 to 1956.

== Description ==
Structures on the ranch include the main ranch house, a garage, a house trailer, a stock shed, a laundry house/office, a shop and barns for chickens, horses and cows. The log house was built in 1933–35, measuring about 29 feet (8.8 m) by 24 feet (7.3 m), and is built in a rustic Craftsman style with a prominent rubble stone foundation. The stock shed was built in the early 1940s. The wood frame shop was built on a foundation dated to 1944. The horse and cow barns are frame structures dating to Willard White's ownership. The ranch is located along Boxelder Creek at an altitude of between 6,200 feet (1,900 m) and 6,300 feet (1,900 m). The historic district comprises the core of the ranch and is 2.3 acres (0.93 ha) in extent.

The Huxtable Ranch Headquarters District was listed on the National Register of Historic Places in on April 17, 2011.
