= Braehead Ranch =

- U.S. National Register of Historic Places
- U.S. Historic district
- Location within Wyoming Location within the United States
- Nearest city: Douglas, Wyoming
- Coordinates: 42°39′59″N 105°39′34″W
- Area: 81.3 acres (32.9 ha)
- Built: 1884
- Built by: Peter George
- Architectural style: Log, frame construction
- NRHP reference No.: 95001074
- Added to NRHP: September 7, 1995

The Braehead Ranch is a ranch complex in Converse County, Wyoming, about 17 miles (27 km) southwest of Douglas. The ranch is in a scenic landscape in the La Prele valley with a view of the red sandstone cliffs of Red Canyon. It was founded by George H. Cross in the 1880s. The original log homestead, built in 1883, has been preserved, together with contemporaneous ranch buildings. Contributing structures in the complex include a log barn (1887), a frame barn (1889), a granary (1900), a chicken house (1910), a windmill and a variety of smaller buildings. The main house dates to 1893-1897, of frame construction.

== History ==
Cross established the ranch in an undeveloped area of Converse County in the 1880s, which quickly became a social center for the area. By 1900 the complex included the Beaver post office, which operated for 15 years. The ranch was named for Cross's Scottish family's ancestral home. Cross himself was born in Montreal on September 15, 1854 and received an education through college. He came to Colorado in 1874 with the intention of becoming a cowboy, then moved to Wyoming in 1875. His 1884 homestead cabin was built by Peter George to accommodate Cross's new wife Lea Marie. Their first two children died in childhood, but nine lived to adulthood. Cross became a county commissioner and a state senator.

Braehead Ranch was listed on the National Register of Historic Places on September 7, 1995.
