= College Inn Bar =

Bar in Douglas, Wyoming established 1906

- U.S. National Register of Historic Places
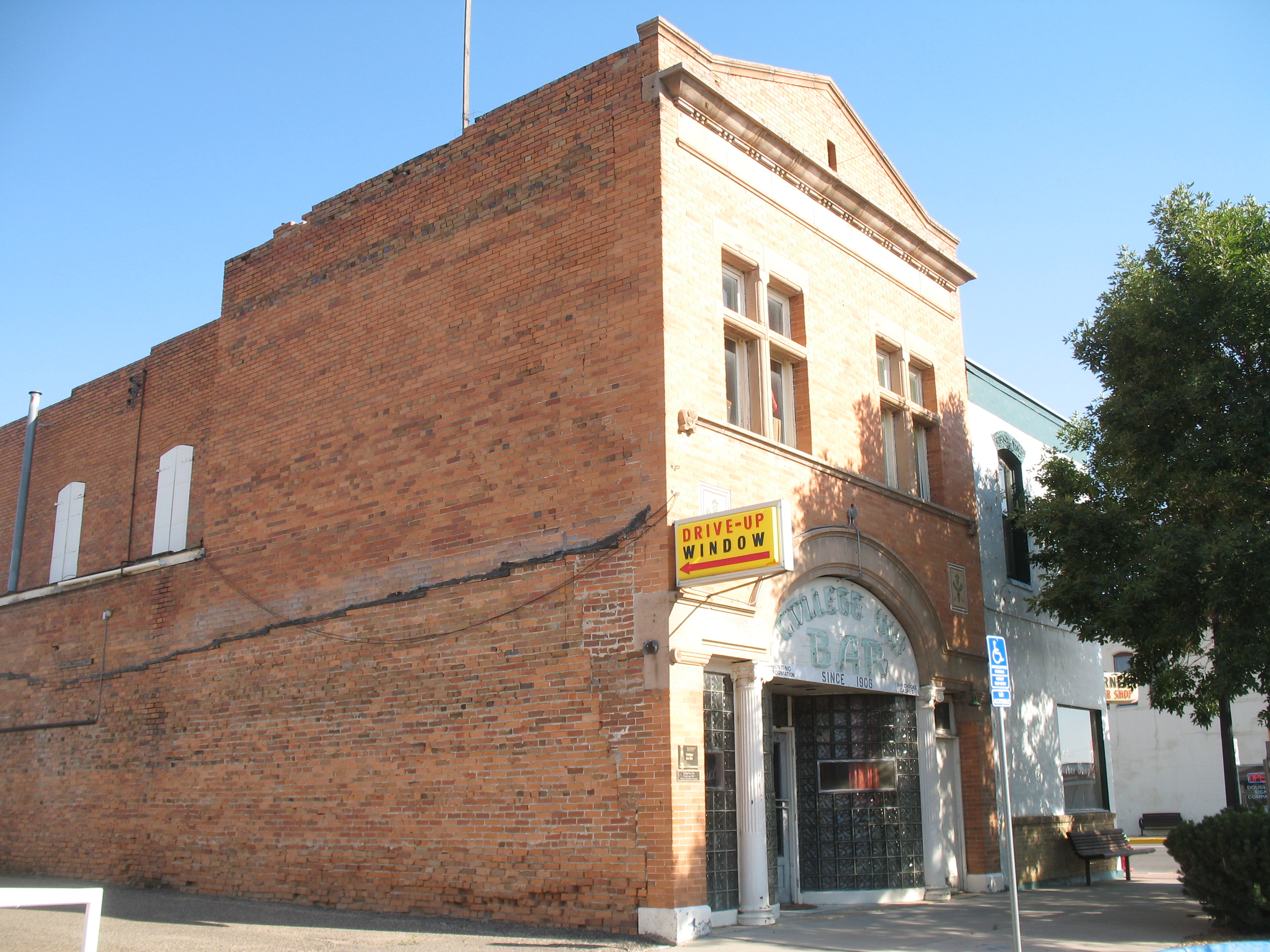

- Location within Wyoming Location within the United States
- Location: 103 N. 2nd St., Douglas, Wyoming
- Coordinates: 42°45′35″N 105°23′06″W
- Area: less than one acre
- Built: 1906
- NRHP reference No.: 79002608
- Added to NRHP: July 10, 1979

The College Inn Bar is the oldest continuously operating business in Douglas, Wyoming and Converse County to remain at its original location. It was established in 1906 by Theodore ("Llee") Pringle on the site of an earlier bar he had operated since 1887, known as "Lee Pringle's." The 1906 structure is a two-story masonry building constructed on the footprint of the original frame building, which was relocated two blocks away and still survives.

== Architecture and interior ==
The College Inn Bar is a rectangular two-story masonry building with 25 feet (7.6 m) of street frontage and 100 feet (30 m) of depth. The bar itself was manufactured by the Brunswick-Balke-Collender Company of Chicago and features elaborate woodwork, including a mirrored back bar of marble and wood. The mirrors were painted with Western scenes in 1953. The barroom is decorated with taxidermy mounts and an arched transom screen with stained glass inserts, surmounted by two mounted golden eagles. Adjacent to the barroom is a lounge that originally contained ten curtained private booths, which were removed during Prohibition; the lounge retains its call buttons and painted murals.

The second floor originally comprised nine elaborately furnished guest rooms and a tenth room designated for gambling. The building's construction incorporated railroad steel and steel cables in an early application of reinforced concrete techniques. The basement functioned as a storeroom for liquor and beer.

== Historic designation ==
The College Inn Bar was listed on the National Register of Historic Places on July 10, 1979.
