= Orpha, Wyoming =

- Unincorporated community
- Location within Wyoming Location within the United States
- Coordinates: 42°51′17″N 105°30′13″W
- Country: United States
- State: Wyoming
- County: Converse
- Elevation: 4,915 ft (1,498 m)
- Time zone: UTC-7 (Mountain (MST))
  - Summer (DST): UTC-6 (MDT)
- Area code: 307
- GNIS feature ID: 1592481

Orpha is an unincorporated community in Converse County, Wyoming, United States. Orpha is located near Wyoming Highway 93, 9 miles (14 km) northwest of Douglas. The town lies just north of the Burlington Northern Santa Fe Railway and the North Platte River.

Fort Fetterman lies across the river from Orpha, a few miles downstream.
