= Wyoming Highway 91 =

State highway in Wyoming, United States

Wyoming Highway 91
- Cold Springs Road
- WYO 91 highlighted in red

Route information
- Maintained by WYDOT
- Length: 23.10 mi (37.18 km)

Major junctions
- West end: CR 11 / CR 24 near La Prele
- WYO 96 near Douglas
- East end: WYO 94 in Douglas

Location
- Country: United States
- State: Wyoming
- Counties: Converse

Highway system
- Wyoming State Highway System; Interstate; US; State
← WYO 90	→ WYO 92

Wyoming Highway 91 (WYO 91) is a 23.10-mile-long (37.18 km) Wyoming state highway in south-central Converse County southwest of Douglas. The highway is locally known as Cold Springs Road.

== Route description ==
Wyoming Highway 91 begins its western end at Converse County Route 11 southwest of La Prele and near the Medicine Bow National Forest boundary. Highway 91 changes to Converse County Route 24 south of there. Highway 91 proceeds northeast as Cold Springs Road and through the community of La Prele. As Highway 91 nears Douglas, the road turns north and meets the eastern terminus of Highway 96 at 20.08 miles (32.32 km). Highway 96 heads west as Highway 91 turns east toward Douglas. Almost at the Douglas city limits, Interstate 25 comes into view to the north and is paralleled by Highway 91 to its end. Highway 91 reaches its eastern end at Highway 94 in Douglas, south of Interstate 25 exit 140.

== History ==
Wyoming Highway 91 was first designated to a stretch of present-day Highway 89 in Lincoln County.

According to the original map of Wyoming State Highways in 1924, present day Highway 89 was numbered Highway 65. With the introduction of U.S. routes in 1926; The routing between Cokeville and Star Valley was renamed Wyoming Highway 89, while the section south of Sage remained Wyoming Highway 65. Highway 89 was numbered in hopes that U.S. Route 89 (which had a northern terminus in central Utah at that time) would be extended north into Wyoming. In 1936, US 89 was extended into Wyoming along old Highway 287. Highway 89 was then renumbered to Highway 91 to avoid confusion between the two highways, while Highway 65 kept its original number. However, within a few years, US 89 was rerouted to its current route in Utah and Idaho, and U.S. Route 189 was created along the old portion of Highway 287. As a result, Highway 89 was redesignated over both Highways 65 and 91.

== Major intersections ==
The entire route is in Converse County.

Location	mi	km	Destinations	Notes
	0.00	0.00	CR 11 north / CR 24 south	Western terminus
	10.10	16.25	WYO 96 west – Casper	Eastern terminus of WYO 96
Douglas	23.10	37.18	WYO 94 – Esterbrook, Douglas	Eastern terminus
1.000 mi = 1.609 km; 1.000 km = 0.621 mi
