= Commerce Block =

- U.S. National Register of Historic Places
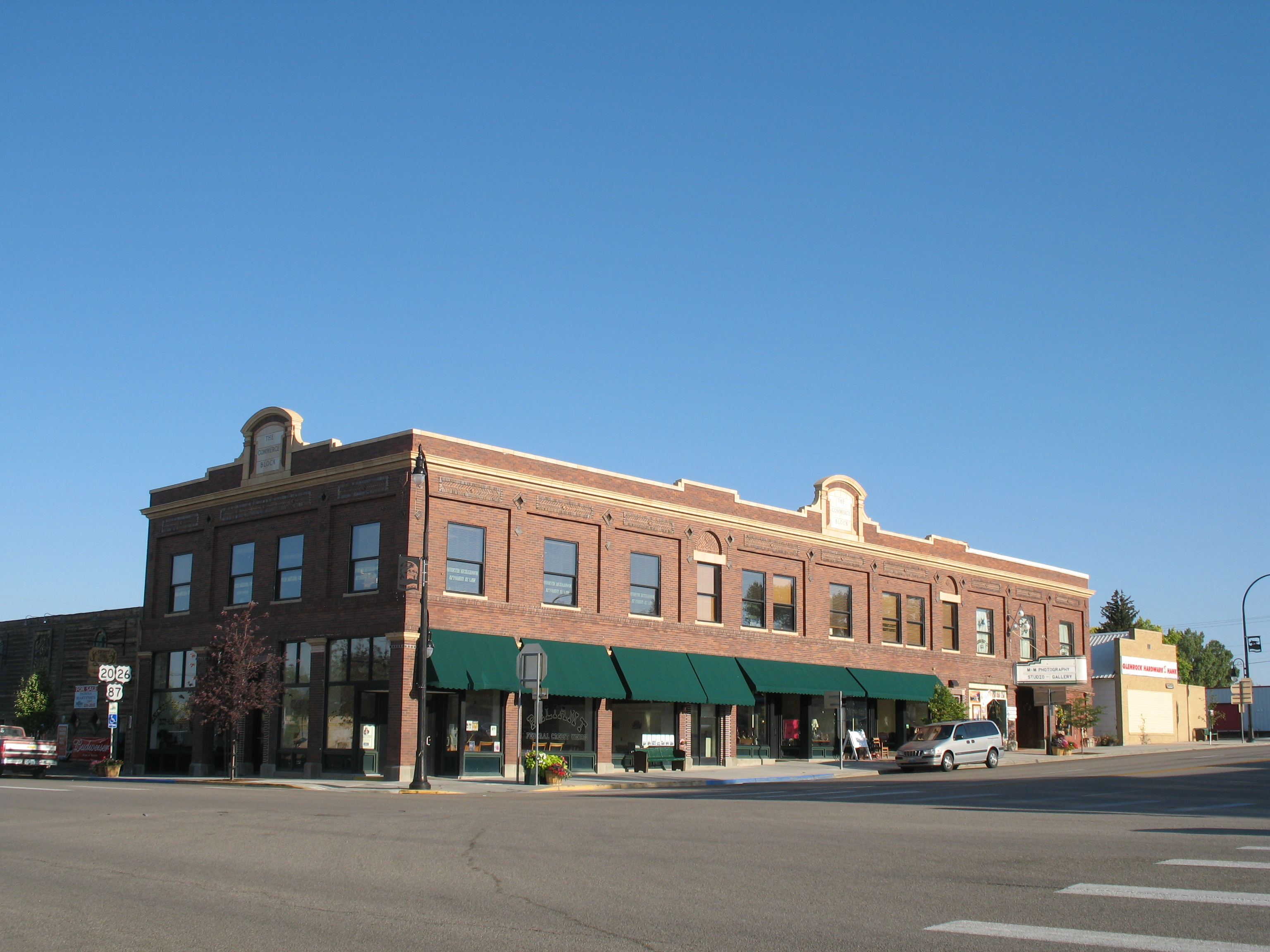
- The Commerce Block in 2012

- Location within Wyoming Location within the United States
- Nearest city: Glenrock, Wyoming
- Coordinates: 42°51′40″N 105°52′17″W
- Area: less than one acre
- Built: 1917
- Built by: Edward A. Reavill,
- Architectural style: 20th Century Commercial
- NRHP reference No.: 04001548
- Added to NRHP: January 21, 2005

Commerce Block is a commercial building in Glenrock, Wyoming, built in 1917 during the Wyoming oil boom of the early 20th century. The nearby Big Muddy oil field brought prosperity to Glenrock, stimulating the growth of the town's commercial district. The building was built for the Glenrock Investment Company, a consortium of local investors, by Edward R. Reavill. The building housed the Glenrock State Bank until 1934. Other businesses in the building included a bar, a billiard parlor and a drug store. The Empress Theater took a two-story space in the east wing of the block. By the late 1920s the oil boom had ended and the theater passed through several owners, closing intermittently. In 1939 it was renamed the Wyoma Theater and had a prominent marquee.

The second floor of the block was occupied by a variety of professional offices and Commerce Hall, a community meeting room. A fire in 1978 damaged the building, leaving it almost vacant into the early 21st century.

== Description ==
The two-story brick building is rectangular in plan, measuring about 50 feet (15 m) by 123 feet (37 m), facing Fourth Street. The block follows the slope of the Fourth Street grade. Prominent terra cotta medallions are placed at the center of the two main facades, both with "The Commerce Block" incised. The interior has been altered to various degrees. The former bank retains its mezzanine and woodwork. The drugstore has a pressed metal ceiling in the front portion with original light fixtures. The theater is intact, with seats removed, and its marquee remains. A basement underlies the building with utility spaces. Much of the second floor was gutted following the fire.

The Commerce Block was listed on the National Register of Historic Places on January 21, 2005. Following its listing it was purchased and renovated by the town of Glenrock.
