= Rolling Hills, Wyoming =

- Town
- Motto: Where the deer and the antelope really do play!
- Location of Rolling Hills in Converse County, Wyoming.

- Location of Rolling Hills, Wyoming
- Coordinates: 42°54′13″N 105°50′36″W
- Country: United States
- State: Wyoming
- County: Converse

Area
  - Total: 0.66 sq mi (1.70 km^{2})
  - Land: 0.66 sq mi (1.70 km^{2})
  - Water: 0 sq mi (0.00 km^{2})
- Elevation: 5,354 ft (1,632 m)

Population (2020)
  - Total: 427
  - Density: 645.4/sq mi (249.19/km^{2})
- Time zone: UTC-7 (Mountain (MST))
  - Summer (DST): UTC-6 (MDT)
- ZIP code: 82637
- Area code: 307
- FIPS code: 56-67440
- GNIS feature ID: 2412572
- Website: www.rollinghillswy.org

Rolling Hills is a town in Converse County, Wyoming, United States, four miles north of Glenrock. It is a planned community (Zip code: 82637) incorporated as a town in 1984. As of the 2020 census, Rolling Hills had a population of 427.

== Geography ==
According to the United States Census Bureau, the town has a total area of 0.66 square miles (1.71 km^{2}), all land.

== Demographics ==
Historical population
Census	Pop.	Note	%±
1990	330		—
2000	449		36.1%
2010	440		−2.0%
2020	427		−3.0%
U.S. Decennial Census

=== 2010 census ===
As of the census of 2010, there were 440 people, 147 households, and 117 families residing in the town. The population density was 666.7 inhabitants per square mile (257.4/km^{2}). There were 150 housing units at an average density of 227.3 per square mile (87.8/km^{2}). The racial makeup of the town was 97.5% White, 0.2% African American, 0.2% Asian, 0.7% from other races, and 1.4% from two or more races. Hispanic or Latino of any race were 3.2% of the population.

There were 147 households, of which 42.9% had children under the age of 18 living with them, 73.5% were married couples living together, 4.8% had a female householder with no husband present, 1.4% had a male householder with no wife present, and 20.4% were non-families. 12.2% of all households were made up of individuals, and 4.1% had someone living alone who was 65 years of age or older. The average household size was 2.99 and the average family size was 3.31.

The median age in the town was 35.3 years. 28.4% of residents were under the age of 18; 8.2% were between the ages of 18 and 24; 27.2% were from 25 to 44; 28.9% were from 45 to 64; and 7.3% were 65 years of age or older. The gender makeup of the town was 50.9% male and 49.1% female.

=== 2000 census ===
As of the census of 2000, there were 449 people, 135 households, and 115 families residing in the town. The population density was 633.9 people per square mile (244.2/km^{2}). There were 143 housing units at an average density of 201.9 per square mile (77.8/km^{2}). The racial makeup of the town was 96.66% White, 0.22% African American, 0.45% Native American, 0.67% Asian, 0.22% from other races, and 1.78% from two or more races. Hispanic or Latino of any race were 2.90% of the population.

There were 135 households, out of which 52.6% had children under the age of 18 living with them, 76.3% were married couples living together, 5.9% had a female householder with no husband present, and 14.8% were non-families. 6.7% of all households were made up of individuals, and 0.7% had someone living alone who was 65 years of age or older. The average household size was 3.33 and the average family size was 3.57.

In the town, the population was spread out, with 35.9% under the age of 18, 8.2% from 18 to 24, 30.3% from 25 to 44, 22.9% from 45 to 64, and 2.7% who were 65 years of age or older. The median age was 31 years. For every 100 females, there were 103.2 males. For every 100 females age 18 and over, there were 107.2 males.

The median income for a household in the town was $50,625, and the median income for a family was $47,917. Males had a median income of $39,250 versus $21,250 for females. The per capita income for the town was $21,767. About 1.6% of families and 3.5% of the population were below the poverty line, including 3.8% of those under age 18 and none of those age 65 or over.

== Education ==
Public education for the town of Rolling Hills is provided by Converse County School District #2. The district has four campuses – Grant Elementary School (grades K–4), Glenrock Intermediate School (grades 5–6), Glenrock Middle School (grades 7–8), and Glenrock High School (grades 9–12).

== Highways ==
- WYO 95 - runs north–south through Rolling Hills, and four miles south to Glenrock, where it intersects with I-25, US 26, and US 87.
