= Wyoming Highway 93 =

State highway in Wyoming, United States

Wyoming Highway 93
- WYO 93 highlighted in red

Route information
- Maintained by WYDOT
- Length: 26.02 mi. (41.88 km)

Major junctions
- South end: WYO 59 in Douglas
- WYO 95 near Carey
- North end: CR 32 / CR 33 near Carey

Location
- Country: United States
- State: Wyoming
- Counties: Converse

Highway system
- Wyoming State Highway System; Interstate; US; State
← WYO 92	→ WYO 94

Wyoming Highway 93 (WYO 93) is a 26.10-mile-long (42.00 km) north–south (northwest-southeast) Wyoming State Road located in central Converse County northwest of Douglas.

== Route description ==
Wyoming Highway 93 begins at Wyoming Highway 59 on the western edge of Douglas, just north of exit 140 of Interstate 25. Highway 93 heads west, and then turns northwest as briefly parallels I-25/US 20/US 26/US 87 before turning north. Highway 93 turns back northwest again as it now parallels railroad track through the community of Morton, and heads to head to the community of Orpha. WYO 93 continues traveling northwest, it reaches the northern terminus of Wyoming Highway 95 near the community of Carey at 18.09 miles (29.11 km). WYO 93 then turns due north, named Highland Loop Road, as Converse CR 31 (Ross Road) runs northwest. Approximately 8 miles later WYO 93 ends at an intersection with Converse CR 32 (Highland Loop Road) which continues the roadway and Converse CR 33 (Willow Creek Road).

== Major intersections ==
The entire route is in Converse County.

Location	mi	km	Destinations	Notes
Douglas	0.00	0.00	WYO 59	Southern terminus
	18.09	29.11	WYO 95 west	Eastern terminus of WYO 95
	26.02	41.88	CR 32 / CR 33	Northern terminus
1.000 mi = 1.609 km; 1.000 km = 0.621 mi
