= Wyoming Highway 96 =

State highway in Wyoming, United States

Wyoming Highway 96
- La Prele Road
- WYO 96 highlighted in red

Route information
- Maintained by WYDOT
- Length: 3.11 mi (5.01 km)

Major junctions
- West end: I-25 / US 20 / US 26 / US 87 / CR 30 near La Prele
- East end: WYO 91 west of Douglas

Location
- Country: United States
- State: Wyoming
- Counties: Converse

Highway system
- Wyoming State Highway System; Interstate; US; State
← WYO 95	→ WYO 110

Wyoming Highway 96 (WYO 96) is a 3.11-mile-long (5.01 km) east–west Wyoming State Road located in south-central Converse County west of Douglas.

== Route description ==
Wyoming Highway 96 begins its western end at exit 146 of Interstate 25 and Converse County Route 30 (Cherokee Trail). WYO 96 runs south 0.05-mile (0.1 km) and turns east and travels south of and parallel to Interstate 25. Wyoming Highway 96 is not signed for exit 146, although it is signed as La Prele Road. Highway 96 eventually veers south away from I-25 and heads southeasterly until it reaches Wyoming Highway 91 west of Douglas at 3.11 miles where the highway ends.

== Major intersections ==
The entire route is in Converse County.

Location	mi	km	Destinations	Notes
	0.00	0.00	I-25 / US 20 / US 26 / US 87 / CR 30	Exit 146 on I-25 / US 20 / US 26 / US 87
	3.11	5.01	WYO 91	Eastern terminus
1.000 mi = 1.609 km; 1.000 km = 0.621 mi
