= John C. Hunton =

- Born: January 18, 1839; Madison County, Virginia, U.S.
- Died: September 4, 1928 (aged 89); Torrington, Wyoming, U.S.
- Resting place: Lakeview Cemetery, Cheyenne, Wyoming, U.S.
- Occupation: Rancher
- Spouse: Blanche Taylor

Colonel John C. Hunton (January 18, 1839 — September 4, 1928) was an American Confederate veteran, pioneer and rancher. He was the founding president of the Wyoming Pioneer Association.

== Early life ==
John C. Hunton was born on January 18, 1839, in Madison County, Virginia. During the American Civil War of 1861–1865, he served in the 7th Virginia Infantry of the Confederate States Army. He was also in Pickett's Charge during the Battle of Gettysburg. Later in life, he became known as "Colonel" Hunton.

== Career ==
After the war, Hunton worked in freighting in Missouri and Nebraska until 1867, when he moved to the Wyoming Territory and became a clerk to the post-trader at Fort Laramie. From 1888 to 1890, he took over as the post-trader.

Hunton established a ranch along the Chugwater Creek in Bordeaux, Wyoming, where he raised cattle. He was the first president of the Wyoming Pioneer Association. He was also "an authority on Indian warfare," and a diarist.

== Personal life, death and legacy ==
Hunton married Blanche Taylor.

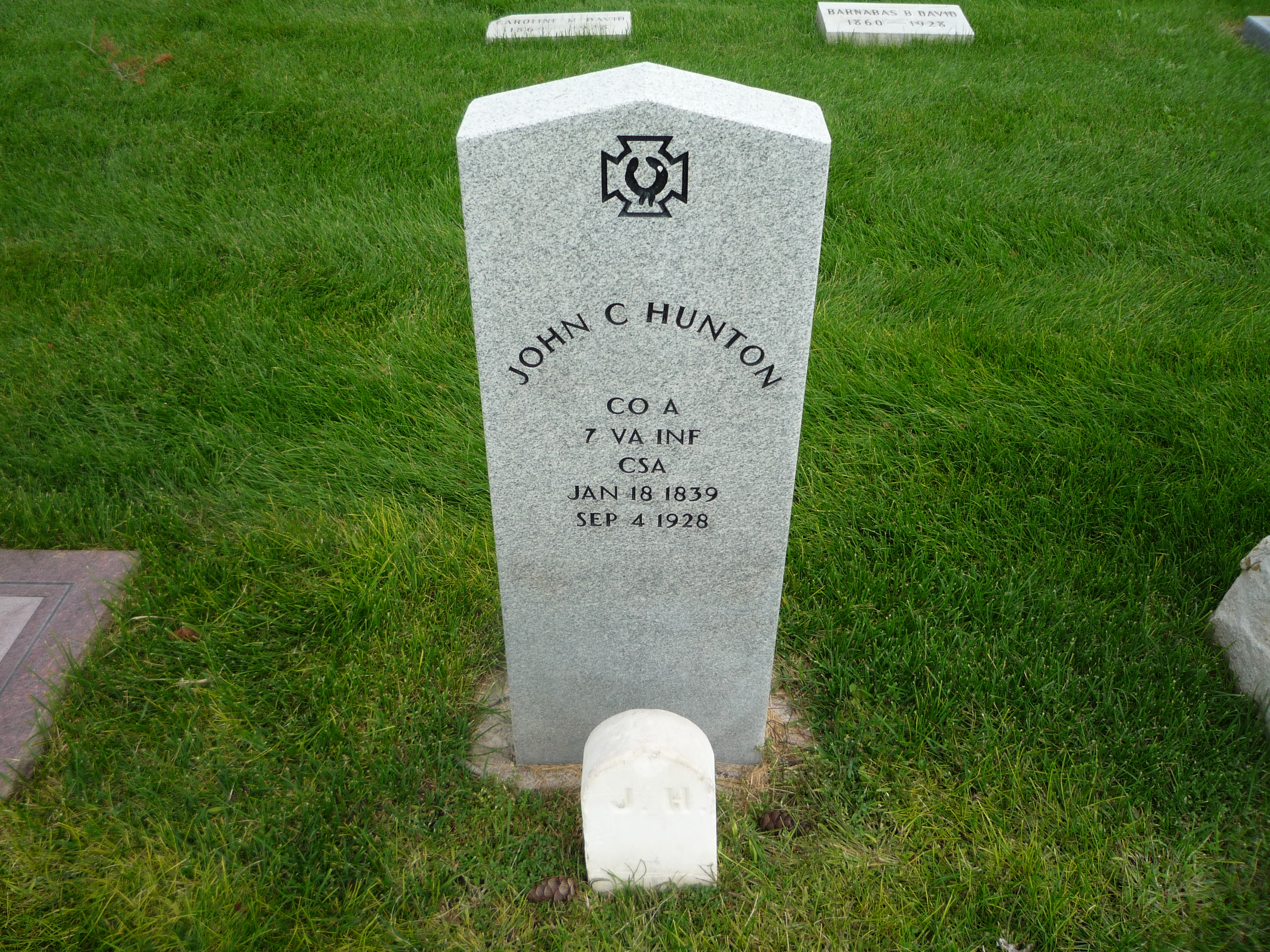
Hunton's grave.

Hunton died on September 4, 1928, in Torrington, Wyoming. He was buried in the Lakeview Cemetery in Cheyenne, Wyoming. In 2010, the United Daughters of the Confederacy added a Confederate marker to his grave.
