= Hotel Higgins =

- U.S. National Register of Historic Places
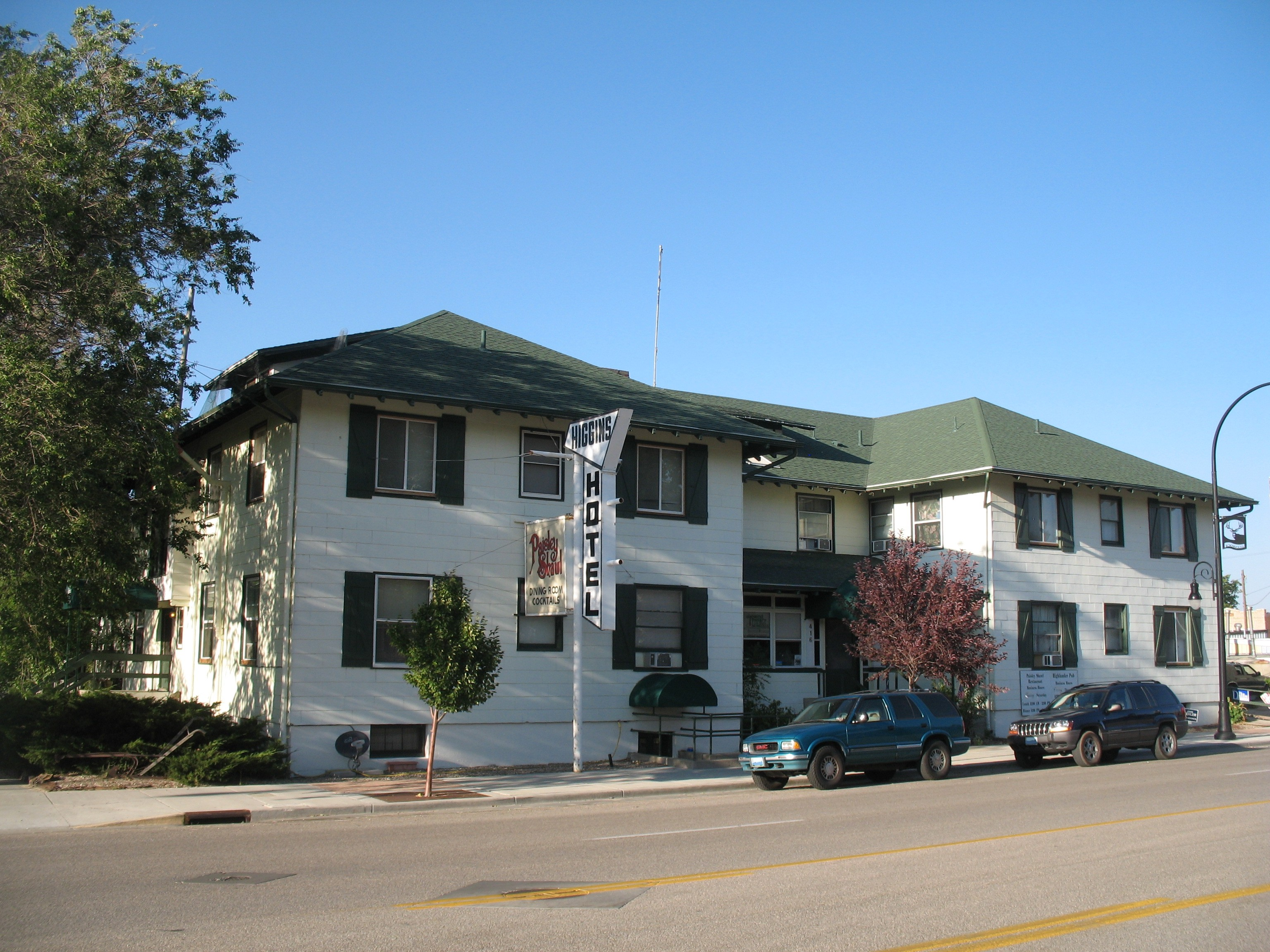
- Higgins Hotel in 2012

- Location within Wyoming Location within the United States
- Location: 416 W. Birch, Glenrock, Wyoming
- Coordinates: 42°51′40″N 105°52′23″W
- Area: less than one acre
- Built: 1916
- Architect: Edward Reavill
- NRHP reference No.: 83004280
- Added to NRHP: November 25, 1983

The Hotel Higgins, Tabor Hotel or Higgins Hotel was built in 1916-1917 during the oil boom in Glenrock, Wyoming. It was built for John E. Higgins, who was a local rancher, legislator and oil business investor, and his wife Josephine Amoretti Higgins. It was designed by architect Edward Reavill, and it opened on May 9, 1917. After the accidental death of Josephine in 1924 and the death of John in 1926 the property was disputed by their heirs. This was resolved in 1942 when the hotel was sold to Dr. and Mrs. Leonard Tabor at a tax sale, and the hotel became the Tabor Hotel. After several new owners the hotel became the Hotel Higgins again in 1978.

== Description ==
The Hotel Higgins is a 2 1/2-story wood-frame building with a U-shaped plan. Two major blocks face the street with deep hipped roofs, connected by a hipped block of the same height set back from the street and fronted by a one-story entrance porch. The side elevations feature small shed dormers that are almost as wide as the hip ridge. Rafter tails are exposed at the eaves. As built it had 38 rooms, with high ceilings and plaster ceiling trim. The original lap siding on the exterior has been covered by asbestos shingle siding.

The Hotel Higgins was listed on the National Register of Historic Places on November 25, 1983.
