= Converse County School District Number 2 =

Public school district in Wyoming, US

Converse County School District #2 is a public school district based in Glenrock, Wyoming, United States. The district's team colors are made up of purple and white, and a bighorn sheep represents their mascot.

== Geography ==
Converse County School District #2 serves the western portion of Converse County, including the following communities:

- Incorporated places
  - Town of Glenrock
  - Town of Rolling Hills

== Schools ==
- Glenrock Junior/Senior High School (Grades 7–12)
- Glenrock Intermediate School (Grades 4–6)
- Grant Elementary School (Grades PK–3)

== Student demographics ==
The following figures are as of October 1, 2009.

- Total district employees: 1,288
- Student enrollment by gender
  - Male: 369 (53.63%)
  - Female: 319 (46.37%)
- Student enrollment by ethnicity
  - American Indian or Alaska Native: 3 (0.44%)
  - Black or African American: 4 (0.58%)
  - Hispanic or Latino: 51 (7.41%)
  - Two or More Races: 12 (1.74%)
  - White: 618 (89.83%)

== Football field ==
In 2014, the high school football field was upgraded to fake turf. The project cost around $800,000, with about $500,000 from the Wyoming Schools Facility Department. The style is the "Field Turf Revolution Model", which is also used by nearby Casper Schools.

== Shootout incident ==
On March 22, 2018, Grant Elementary and the High School went into lock-down, and the Middle School was placed on high alert, due to a shootout around the time students were supposed to leave, just happening down the street of the high school. The lock-down went into effect around 2:10 pm. The house where the shootout was happening started on fire and eventually, they suspect was taken into custody. At about 4:40 pm, the lock-down was lifted and the kids could go home.

== See also ==
- List of school districts in Wyoming
