= Wyoming Highway 94 =

State highway in Wyoming, United States

Wyoming Highway 94
- Esterbrook Road
- WYO 94 highlighted in red

Route information
- Maintained by WYDOT
- Length: 16.61 mi (26.73 km)

Major junctions
- South end: CR 5 near Esterbrook
- WYO 91 in Douglas
- North end: / I-25 Bus. / US 20 Bus. / US 26 Bus. / US 87 Bus. WYO 59 in Douglas

Location
- Country: United States
- State: Wyoming
- Counties: Converse

Highway system
- Wyoming State Highway System; Interstate; US; State
← WYO 93	→ WYO 95

Wyoming Highway 94 (WYO 94) is a 16.61-mile-long (26.73 km) north–south Wyoming State Road located in southern Converse County south of Douglas.

== Route description ==
Wyoming Highway 94 begins its southern end south of Douglas, 10 miles (16 km) north of Esterbrook. Converse County Route 5 takes over the roadway to Esterbrook. WYO 94 heads north towards Douglas, and parallels the North Platte River for much of its length. Nearing the city, WYO 94 briefly parallels Interstate 25 and U.S. Routes 20/26/87 as Highway 94 meets the eastern terminus of Wyoming Highway 91 (Cold Springs Road). WYO 94 passes under the interstate as it enters the city limits, and shortly thereafter reaches its northern end at an intersection with I-25 BUS/US 20 BUS/US 26 BUS/US 87 BUS (W. Yellowstone Highway), and the southern terminus of Wyoming Highway 59 at approximately 16.6 miles.

== Major intersections ==
The entire route is in Converse County.

Location	mi	km	Destinations	Notes
	0.00	0.00	CR 5	Southern terminus
Douglas	16.14	25.97	WYO 91 west	Eastern terminus of WYO 91
Douglas	16.61	26.73	I-25 BL / US 20 Bus. / US 26 Bus. / US 87 Bus. WYO 59 north	Northern terminus Southern terminus of WYO 59
1.000 mi = 1.609 km; 1.000 km = 0.621 mi
