= Bordeaux, Wyoming =

- Unincorporated community
- Location within Wyoming
- Coordinates: 41°56′10″N 104°50′41″W
- Country: United States
- State: Wyoming
- County: Platte
- Elevation: 4,862 ft (1,482 m)
- Time zone: UTC-7 (Mountain (MST))
  - Summer (DST): UTC-6 (MDT)
- Area code: 307
- GNIS feature ID: 1597225

Bordeaux is an unincorporated community in Platte County, Wyoming, United States.

== Notable person ==
- John C. Hunton - Confederate veteran, pioneer and rancher.
