= North Douglas Historic District =

- U.S. National Register of Historic Places
- U.S. Historic district
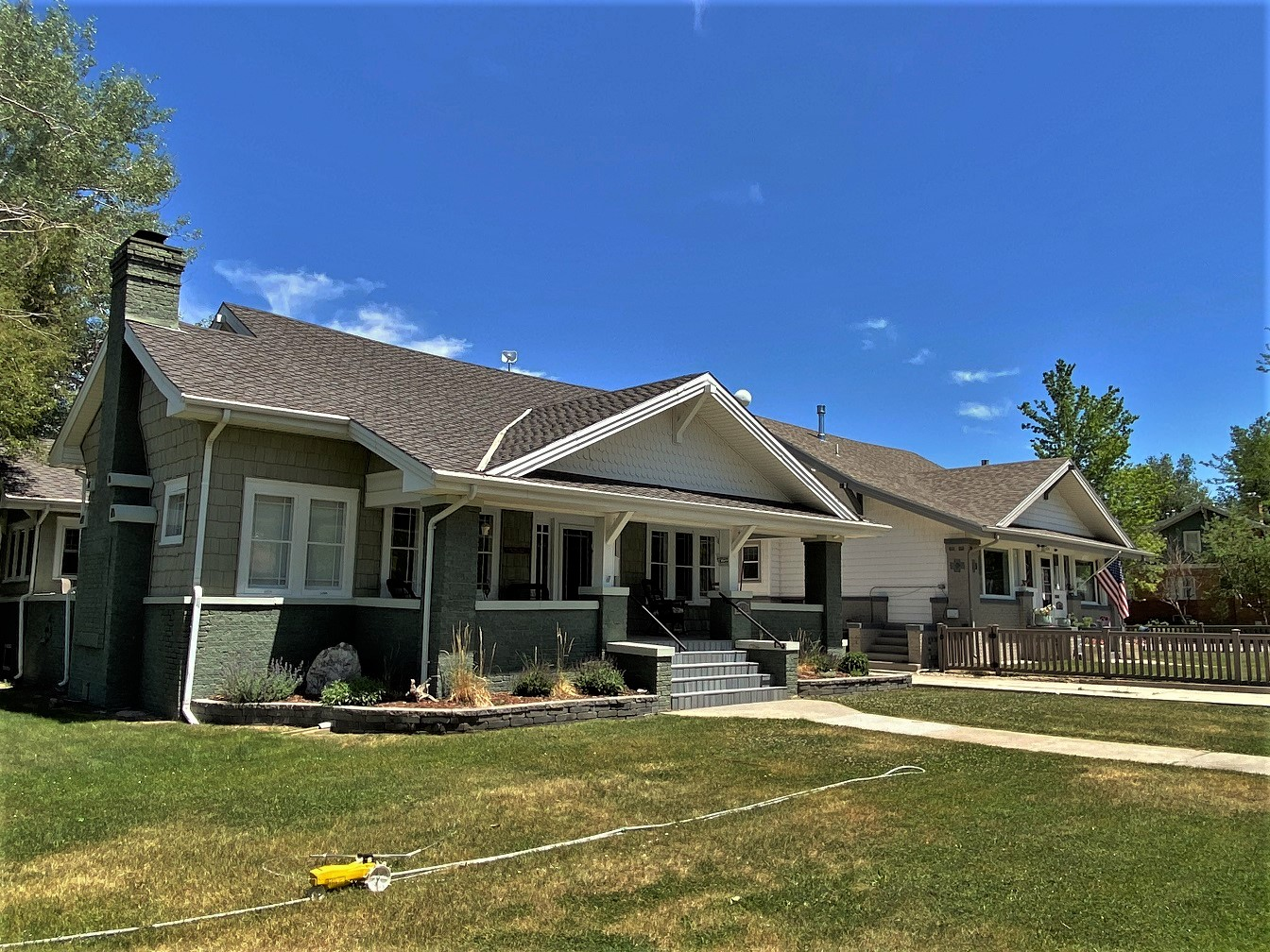
- Location: Roughly bounded by Second St., Clay St. Sixth St., and Center St., Douglas, Wyoming
- Coordinates: 42.76227°N 105.38126°W
- Area: 50 acres (20 ha)
- Built: 1886
- Architectural style: Queen Anne, Bungalow/craftsman, et al.
- NRHP reference No.: 00001470
- Added to NRHP: November 25, 2002

The North Douglas Historic District is a residential section of Douglas, Wyoming, adjoining the original commercial district of Douglas to the north and east. The district grew from about 1904 to about 1912, with a few infills up to the 1940s. The neighborhood is composed chiefly of frame houses on 50-foot (15 m) by 125 feet (38 m) lots, with a greater proportion of brick houses near the former brick plant at the edge of the district. About 100 houses are listed as contributing structures.

The North Douglas Historic District was placed on the National Register of Historic Places on November 25, 2002.
