= Wyoming Pioneer Association =

- Established: 1926
- Location: PO Box 1545, Douglas, Wyoming 82633
- Coordinates: 42.75979°N 105.39049°W
- Type: Association
- Website: Wyoming Pioneer Association

Wyoming Pioneer Association is an organization that aims to preserve Wyoming's pioneer history. The association was formed in 1884 and incorporated in 1926 in a small pioneer cabin located on the Wyoming State Fairgrounds in Douglas; the Wyoming legislature appropriated funds for construction of a museum at the same location in 1956, and the association expanded its facilities in 2013 to add the Ruthe James Williams Center.

== History ==
The group that would become the association began annual meetings at the Wyoming State Fair in 1905, following unofficial meetings dating back to 1884. The attendees at the original meeting site in the Wyoming Pioneer Cabin included soldiers, freighters, cowboys, and stockmen, many of whom had been instrumental in achieving statehood for Wyoming. The Wyoming's Old Timer's Association, created in 1914, is the precursor of the Wyoming Pioneer Association. Some members defined "Old Timers" as "including only those who personally had a part in bringing the Territory into Statehood." The first president of the association was John Hunton. The Wyoming Pioneer Association was incorporated on January 8, 1926. The association first met on September 15, 1926, in downtown Douglas, at the Princess Theater. Hunton called the first meeting to order that day. The association founded itself upon the Old Timers association.

By the 1950s, the cabin was insufficient to accommodate the increased membership when being used for meetings. In 1956 the Wyoming Legislature appropriated state funds to build the Wyoming Pioneer Museum. This allowed the Association to build a new structure to replace the cabin's functions for social gatherings and for housing the Association's possessions. The museum was approved and built on the Wyoming State Fairgrounds next door to the cabin. In 2013, the Association financed and constructed the Ruthe James Williams Center located adjacent to the museum.

=== Ruthe James Williams Center ===
"In 1927 the Wyoming Pioneer Association built the Pioneer Cabin to host their annual meetings. Just one year earlier, the group dating back to 1884, was incorporated," says President Mary Engebretsen. "In recent years, with a group too large for the cabin, we've been meeting in the Wyoming State Fair Cafeteria." Circa 2012 the association recognized a need to increase the size of their meeting facilities and display space for historical artifacts.

The new building was funded by a large contribution from Jack and Ruthe James Williams and named in Ruthe's honor. James Williams' parents were pioneers who made their home in the Douglas, Wyoming, area in 1917, and gave birth to her in 1919. James Williams grew up mostly in Douglas. She received formal education in Douglas, but also in Idaho, where her parents had immigrated from. In Douglas, she and Jack courted.

Williams was a member of the Wyoming National Guard, stationed in Fort Lewis, Washington, when Pearl Harbor was bombed in December 1941. In March 1942, Williams died in an accidental fire in the company barracks in Roseburg, Oregon, that morning.

Unbeknownst to anyone, six months prior, the couple had gotten married when Williams was on furlough in Wyoming. Due to the circumstances of his death, James Williams moved to Washington State in accordance with the earlier plans she and Williams had made. When James Williams died in 2008, she bequeathed Wyoming Pioneer Association a significant piece of her estate. The Wyoming Pioneer Association expended the bulk of those funds to construct the Ruthe James Williams Center. In 2013, association members met in the new center.

=== Present day ===
The Wyoming Pioneer Association celebrated 125 years in 2015. They celebrated during the Wyoming State Fair which ran from August 7 through 16 in Douglas, Wyoming. Specially for this year were the 1926 Pioneer Cabin and the Grist Mill being open to the public. The association tallied almost 1,200 people visiting the cabin. "It was very exciting, and this is just the beginning," Mary Engebretson, president of the association says. "We now have a Memorandum of Understanding with State Parks and Cultural Resources and the Wyoming Department of Agriculture that allows us the flexibility to open, use and showcase the historical buildings, which are the original Pioneer Cabin, two school houses and the Grist Mill, to do a lot more with the old buildings and more in creating the complex."

== Mission and purpose ==
In 2016, the Association's president, Bob Vollman, changed the association's mission to the following:

The mission and purpose of the Wyoming Pioneer Association is to keep alive the traditions of family loyalty, integrity, and honor that have sustained us in the past and made Wyoming great. We will build on our heritage and history with the confidence that our future generations will be as proud of us as we are of our ancestors.

The Wyoming Pioneer Association acts as an advisory board to the Pioneer Museum, which is operated by the State of Wyoming. The museum is open all year. The museum collects and displays artifacts important to the West and its expansion as well as to pioneers.

== Wyoming Pioneer Memorial Museum ==
The museum was first created in 1927 in what is now referred to as the Wyoming Pioneer Cabin. The association operated the museum at that site until 1956, when the state built a new museum using appropriated funds. In 2017, the museum created an Advisory Council to support the superintendent, and the association has a permanent voting member. The association continues in its role as the Friends of the Museum Group.

The museum has been running continuously since 1927, having relocated to its current building in 1956. Some examples of items on display are an original jackalope, a historic bar, historic photographs, and a Native American artifact collection. The museum also displays the bib overalls from 1979 ProRodeo Hall of Fame inductee stock contractor Charles Irwin.

== Memorials ==
One of the ways the Wyoming Pioneer Association currently gets involved in the Wyoming community is to recognize and honor work having to do with cemeteries and veterans.

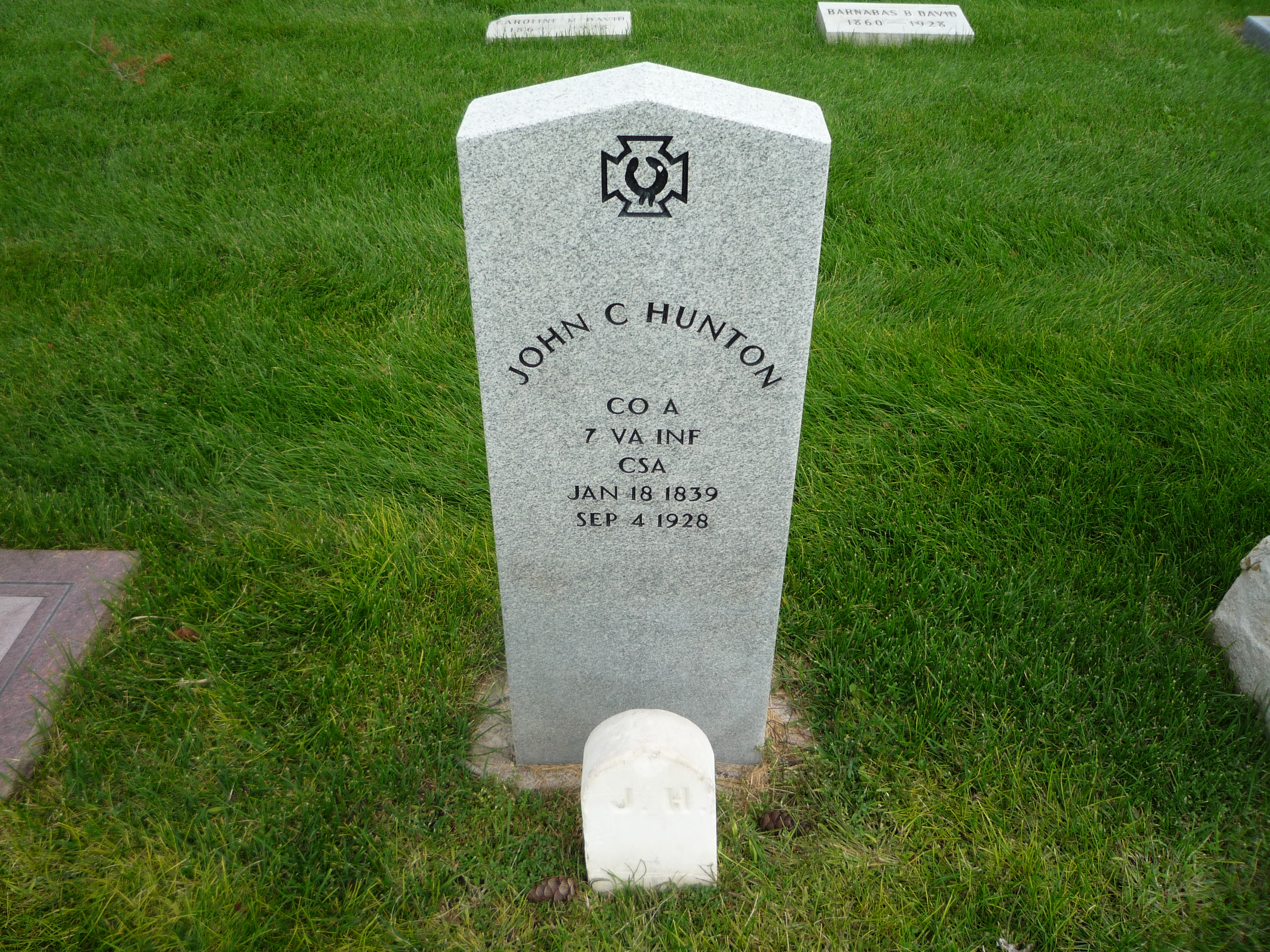
Hunton's grave front view

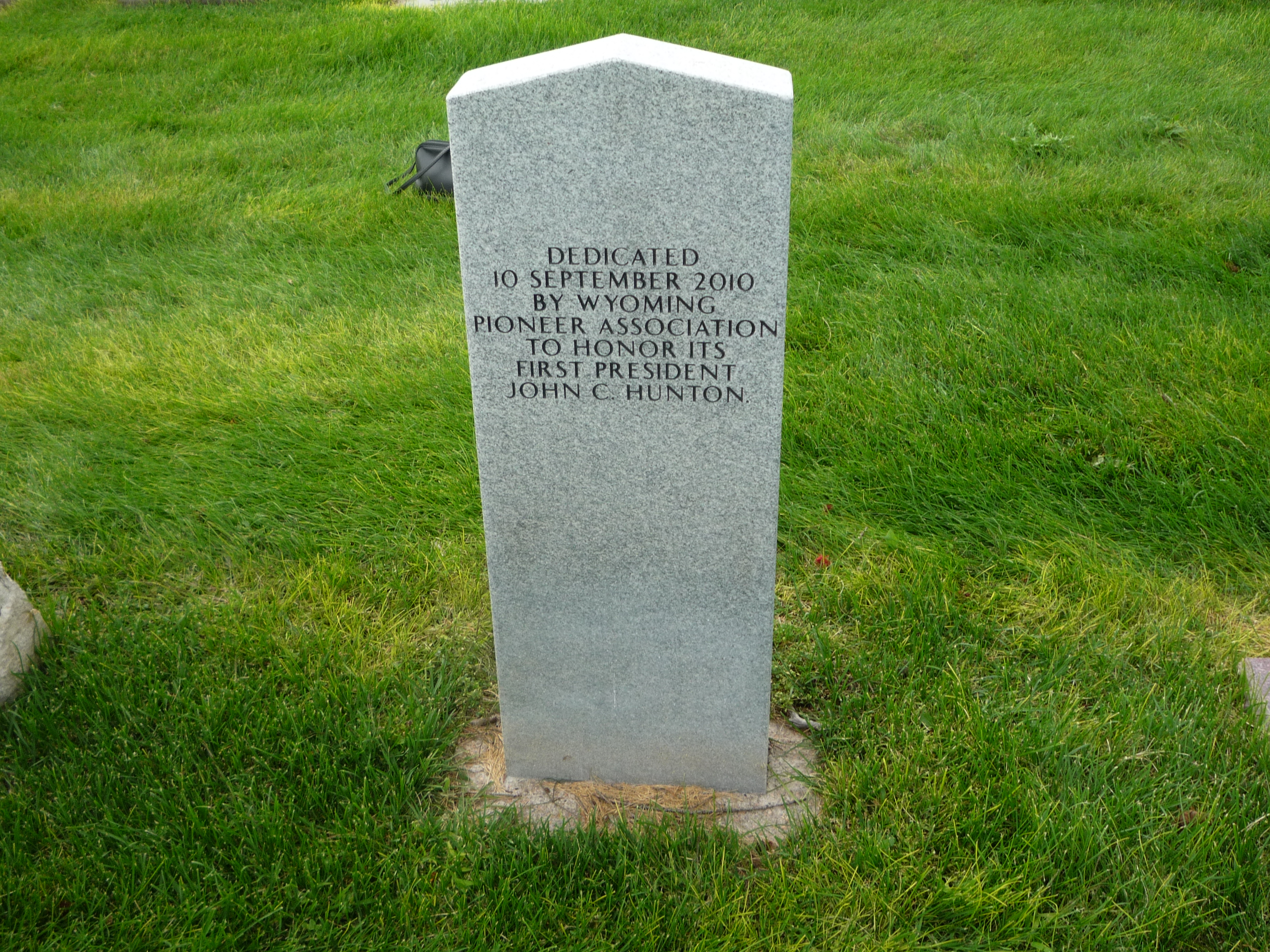
Hunton's grave rear view

In 2010, John C. Hunton received a proper grave marker from the association. In 1839 Hunton was born in Madison, Virginia and served in the American Civil War prior to relocating to Wyoming. In addition to being the founding president, Hunton was one of Wyoming's first cattlemen. He worked many positions and started his own businesses throughout Wyoming Territory. His diaries "serve as some of Wyoming’s earliest historical documents". He helped found the Wyoming Stock Growers Association and the Cheyenne Social Club. In 1890, Wyoming achieved statehood, and helping found the Wyoming Pioneer Association was key to that goal. Hunton served as Laramie County Commissioner in Cheyenne. He died September 4, 1928, at 89 years of age and was buried in Cheyenne, Wyoming with only a small white stone with his initials marking the spot. Association member and Cheyenne resident, Beverly Holmes, and retired Army Colonel Bob Fesack worked to facilitate the new marker, using Hunton's Civil War records to apply to the Veteran's Administration for the gravestone. The new gravestone was installed next to the original marker in Westlake Cemetery. Prior to the ceremony, there was a presentation at the Wyoming National Guard Museum, where retired U.S. Army Colonel Bob Bezek shared Hunton's military history. The unveiling then took place at Lakeview Ceremony. Hunton served in the Virginia Infantry for the Confederate Army, including a spell as a prisoner of war.

In 2016, the association granted its second Historical Restoration Award to a community who refurbished a cemetery in Niobrara County, Wyoming.

== See also ==
Wyoming Pioneer Memorial Museum
