= Ross, Wyoming =

- Unincorporated community
- Location within Wyoming Location within the United States
- Coordinates: 43°26′46″N 105°53′12″W
- Country: United States
- State: Wyoming
- County: Converse
- Elevation: 5,180 ft (1,580 m)
- Time zone: UTC-7 (Mountain (MST))
  - Summer (DST): UTC-6 (MDT)
- Area code: 307
- GNIS feature ID: 1597481

Ross is an unincorporated community in Converse County, Wyoming, United States. Ross is located on Wind Creek in northwestern Converse County, 45.5 miles (73.2 km) north-northeast of Casper.
