= Dorr Ranch =

- U.S. National Register of Historic Places
- Location within Wyoming Location within the United States
- Nearest city: Bill, Wyoming
- Coordinates: 43°23′15″N 105°10′56″W
- MPS: Ranches, Farms and Homesteads in Wyoming, 1860-1960 MPS
- NRHP reference No.: 14001080
- Added to NRHP: December 22, 2014

The Dorr Ranch was established by William and Mabel Dorr in 1910 in Converse County, Wyoming along Woody Creek. William had left home at the age of 8 or 9 and worked for the 71 Quarter Ranch and as a horse wrangler at Pony Express stations in Wyoming. He met Mabel McIntosh and married her in 1904. Mabel's parents had established the successful Hat Ranch near Split Rock and had significant resources to assist the young couple. The Dorrs filed for their first homestead in 1910 and expanded it in 1915, and again in 1917 and 1919, with a separate 1919 filing by Mabel. The Dorr's properties were not contiguous, and the present ranch house on Woody Creek was not built until 1915. In 1919 the Dorr School was built on the ranch. The same year the community of Bill was established, named after the shared name of four of the founders. The main ranch house was built in 1926–27.

The Dorrs raised cattle and horses, running up to 700 horses for sale to the U.S. and Mexican armies. From about 1929 the property was leased and sold to a series of companies associated with the Dorrs, apparently to cover financial trouble. In 1939 the Dorrs moved to Miles City, Montana and the Morton family operated the ranch as part of their extensive holdings, using the Dorr ranch house as an overseers residence.

The ranch was finally sold to the Mortons in 1947, part of a 16,464-acre (6,663 ha) transaction.

== Description ==
The ranch includes the 1925 main house, two 1915 log cabins, a stable, corral, windmill, cistern and the site of the schoolhouse. The main house is a two-story frame house on a sandstone foundation, with nine rooms, measuring about 36 feet (11 m) by 32 feet (9.8 m). One log cabin has two rooms, the other one. The windmill has a functioning Aeromotor. Other structures include a two-seat privy.

The Dorr Ranch was listed on the National Register of Historic Places in on December 22, 2014.
