= George W. Cross =

American politician

Member of the Missouri House of Representatives from the Cape Girardeau County district
- In office 1923–1931

Personal details
- Born: September 30, 1872 Pulaski, New York
- Died: Unknown
- Party: Republican
- Spouse: Vina B. Phelan
- Occupation: politician, manufacturer, railroad receiver

George W. Cross (born September 30, 1872) was an American politician from Cape Girardeau County, Missouri, who served in the Missouri House of Representatives. He married Vina B. Phelan of Memphis, Tennessee, in the city of Osceola, Arkansas. He worked as a manufacturer and also for the Cape Girardeau Northern Railway.
