= George H. Cross =

American politician (1854–1946)

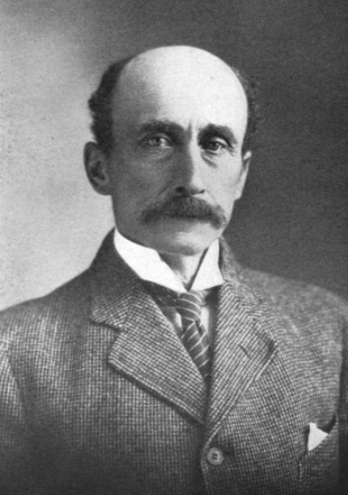

Member of the Wyoming Senate
- In office January 7, 1895 – January 4, 1897
- In office January 4, 1909 – January 6, 1913

Personal details
- Born: George Harry Cross; September 15, 1854 Montreal, Province of Canada
- Died: November 28, 1946 (aged 92) Douglas, Wyoming, U.S.
- Resting place: Douglas Park Cemetery, Douglas, Wyoming
- Party: Democratic
- Spouse: Lea Marie LeVasseur
- Children: 11
- Parents: Alex Cross (father); Julia Fisher Cross (mother)
- Education: Upper Canada College; Nicolet College; University of Oxford
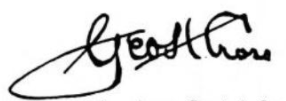
- Signature

George Harry Cross (September 15, 1854 – November 28, 1946) was an American politician who served as a member of the Wyoming Senate as a Democrat.

== Life ==
George Harry Cross was born in Montreal, Province of Canada to Julia Fisher Cross and Alex Cross, who was a member of the King's Council and was Chief Justice for the Province of Quebec, on September 15, 1854, and attended the High School of Montreal. He later attended the Upper Canada College, Nicolet College, and the University of Oxford. In December 1874 he moved to Riverbend, Colorado Territory and then moved to the Wyoming Territory in 1875. In 1883 he became an American citizen and in 1884 he returned to Montreal and married Lea Marie LeVasseur whom he would later have eleven children with, including Senate President George A. Cross.

In 1888 Cross was elected to the Converse county board of commissioners. He was elected to the Wyoming House of Representatives to represent Converse county and served from 1895 until 1897 then served again from 1909 to 1913. In 1896 he was selected as one of the Democratic presidential electors for Wyoming, but resigned to run for another term in the state senate.

In 1930 he was elected as president of the Wyoming Pioneer Association for a one year term. In 1934 Nate Warren, the Republican nominee for Colorado's gubernatorial election, was a guest to Cross's ranch for three days. On November 28, 1946, he died from pneumonia at his home in Douglas, Wyoming.
