= Douglas station (Wyoming) =

- Fremont, Elkhorn & Missouri Valley Railroad Passenger Depot
- U.S. National Register of Historic Places
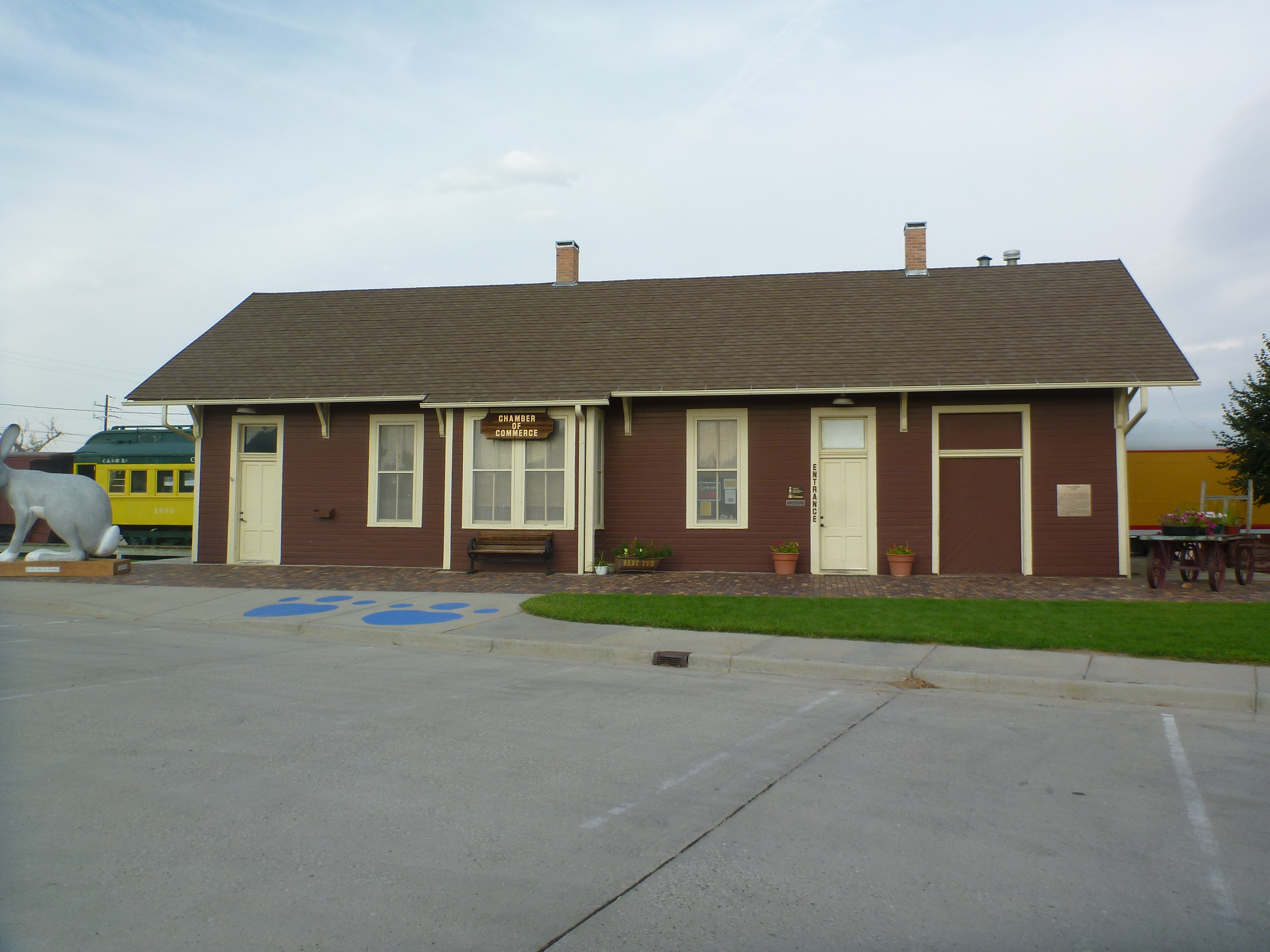
- The Douglas Interpretive Center in 2010

- Location within Wyoming Location within the United States
- Location: 121 Brownfield Rd., Douglas, Wyoming
- Coordinates: 42°45′32″N 105°23′15″W
- Area: less than one acre
- Built: 1887
- Built by: Chicago & Northwestern Railroad
- Architectural style: Late Victorian, Standardized railroad plans
- NRHP reference No.: 94000741
- Added to NRHP: August 3, 1994

The Fremont, Elkhorn & Missouri Valley Railroad Passenger Depot, also known as the Chicago and North Western Railway Passenger Depot and presently as the Douglas Railroad Interpretive Center, was built in 1886 in Douglas, Wyoming to accommodate traffic on the Fremont, Elkhorn and Missouri Valley Railroad's (FE&MV) terminus at the newly built town. The depot was built as a fairly small, cautious investment in a possibly ephemeral frontier town. Immediately following the completion of the depot Douglas saw an epidemic of typhoid fever and the worst winter in a generation, and the railroad decided to push on to Casper for its terminus. The town's population declined from 1600 in 1886 to 900 in 1888. By 1891 Owen Wister reported that Douglas had a population of about 350. However, by 1910 Douglas had 2246 residents and hosted the Wyoming State Fair. The presence of the fair stimulated rail traffic, while the FE&MV merged with the Cheyenne and Northern Railway in 1903. In 1905 oil development started. In the 1950s coal mining began for the Dave Johnson Power Plant and the railway expanded its Douglas facilities to accommodate the traffic, closing the original depot and building a larger facility. The depot was acquired from the railroad's successor, the Chicago and North Western Railway, by the city in 1990.

== Description ==
The rectangular frame structure is a typical small railroad depot, measuring about 80 feet (24 m) by 26 feet (7.9 m), built to a standardized railroad plan. Like most such depots, the station has a protruding bay on the long side facing the track to allow the stationmaster to see up and down the line. The interior has five spaces: a waiting room, an office, bathrooms, freight handling and freight storage. The interior woodwork is intact.

The depot was placed on the National Register of Historic Places on August 3, 1994. The town has developed the depot as the Douglas Railroad Interpretive Center with displays of locomotives and railroad cars and equipment. The display opened in 1995.

Rolling Stock Exhibits
Designation	Number	Commissioning	Decommissioning	Comment
Chicago, Burlington & Quincy Railroad (CB&Q) 4-8-4 Steam Locomotive #5633	# 5633	1940	1962	Entering the locomotive is prohibited
Built in the CB&Q shops at West Burlington, Iowa in September 1940 as one of the last class of steam locomotives on the Burlington. One of twenty-eight 317 tonnes (317,000 kg) units that were assigned Class 0-5A. They were designed for fast freight and heavy passenger service.				
Chicago, Burlington & Quincy Railroad (CB&Q) Dining Car	# 196	1947	1972	Half consists of kitchen, the other half is the dining room, with seating for 48
Built by the Budd Company at Philadelphia, PA as a 48-seat Diner in March 1947. Called the "Silver Salver" and numbered #196, later Burlington Northern #1160. It was used on the Morning and Afternoon Zephyr trains between Chicago and Minneapolis.				
Union Pacific Railroad Double Deck Stock Car	# 48330D	1914	1964	Modification 1936
Stock Cars are used to move pigs and sheep. This is a "Double-deck" as it has two interior floors, one above the other. Originally built for the Union Pacific Railroad in 1914, as a boxcar for hauling dry goods. Its conversion to a stock car required the removal of alternate boards along the side, installation of the second floor. The red boxcar was repainted yellow at that time. This version has a single full height door, opening to both levels. Many purpose built stock cars used Dutch doors, to allow for separate access to each level.				
Great Northern Railway (GN) Sleeping Car	# 1182	1950	1972	20 compartments
Built by Pullman Standard at Pullman, Illinois in December 1950, one of eight sleeping cars with 16 duplex roomettes and four bedrooms. It was assigned to the Western Star, on the Chicago to Seattle train. With a capacity of 24 passengers plus the porter. It was named the "Augassiz Glacier" and numbered #1182.				
Union Pacific Railroad Baggage Car	# 1897	1911	1961	Built as a mail cart
Built by the Pullman Car Company at their Michigan City, Indiana plant in February 1911 for the Union Pacific subsidiary Oregon Short Line Railroad as #331. Renumbered in 1914 as #2114 and again to #1897 in 1924. Car is configured as a working mail car with provision for a baggage and handled mail, and fresh produce.				
Chicago & Northwestern Railway (C&NW) Steel Sheathed Wooden Day Coach	# 1886	1884	1961	72 seats
Built at St. Louis Car Company in 1884 as a part of an order for ten short sixty foot coaches for the "Cowboy Line" of the C&NW being built at the time through Douglas to Lander, Wyoming. It was rebuilt in 1915 by American Car and Foundry Company at Jeffersonville, Indiana when it had steel sheathing installed over the wooden siding and electric lights replaced the gas lights. The coach operated on the North Western Ltd., Victory, Corn King, Viking and Black Hills Express. In 1932 it was assigned to suburban service in the Chicago area where it continued in operation until 1961.				
Chicago Burlington & Quincy Railroad (CB&Q) Wooden Caboose	# 14140	1884	1958	Office and car for the train attendants
This is the oldest piece of rolling stock on display. It was built by the Burlington and Missouri River Railroad in the company shops at Plattsmouth, Nebraska in 1884 at a cost of $1023 as a mainline freight caboose. It was modernized with new brakes in 1912 for use on branch lines in Nebraska and Kansas. It always held the number #14140. It is configured as sleeping quarters for the train crew.				
Fairmont Motor Car	# 217980		1960?	Single-seater, use and others for track inspection
Fairmont Model M-19 series AA, Group 4, serial #217980. Originally sold to the Union Pacific Railroad and later sold to and used by the Colorado & Southern as a track inspection car. Motor cars were used for track inspection and to transport workers. Built to the various needs of the railroads, Motor Cars varied in size and style. They are slow, with a top speed of about 30 miles per hour (48 km/h). Motor cars were locally known as "track cars," "speeders," and "jiggers". The Fairmont car is a single-seater, the smallest version; larger units could hold 12 or more people. Motor cars were replaced in the 1980'S by the "Hy-rail." This attachment is added to standard road worthy pickup trucks, allowing them; by means of retractable, rail-guided wheels, to ride the rails.				

Preceding station	Chicago and North Western Railway	Following station
Fetterman toward Lander	Fremont, Elkhorn and Missouri Valley Railroad; Main Line	Irvine toward Omaha
