= Wyoming State Fair =

Agricultural fair in Wyoming

Coordinates: 42°45′31″N 105°23′31″W

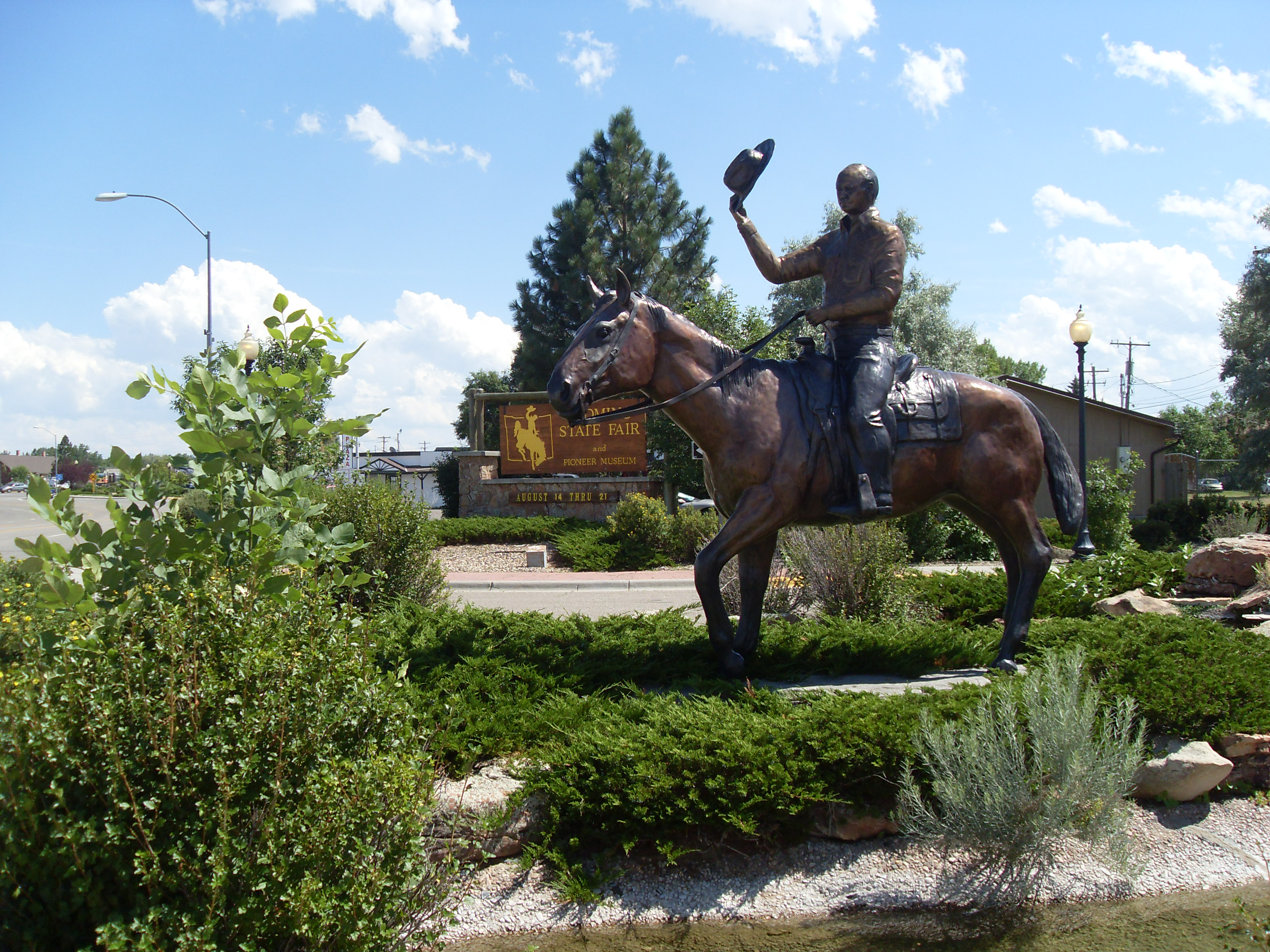
Main entrance of the Wyoming State Fair

The Wyoming State Fair is a largely agricultural exposition and rodeo held every August in Douglas in Converse County in southeastern Wyoming. The fairgrounds are located on west Yellowstone Highway on the waterside of North Platte River. The state fair began in 1886 as the “First Annual Wyoming Territorial Fair near Cheyenne. After events in Laramie, Sheridan and Casper, Douglas won the nomination in 1905 to host the fair thereafter. There were no fair events in 1935 to 1937 during the Depression and none in 1942 to 1945 because of World War II

The 2012 State Fair, the centennial of the event, was held from August 11-18th, with singer Dierks Bentley headlining the first ever sold-out concert at the fair in Douglas.

The 101st fair opened on August 10, 2013. It hosted the country musicians Hunter Hayes and Brantley Gilbert.

Despite the COVID-19 pandemic in 2020, the fair resisted cancellation.

The state fair is overseen by the Wyoming State Fair Governing Board which was created via statute in the 2018 legislative session.

During the fair, a maximum of 460 camping places are available on the south side of the fairgrounds; parking space is limited.

== See also ==
- Wyoming Pioneer Association
