= Glenrock, Wyoming =

- Town
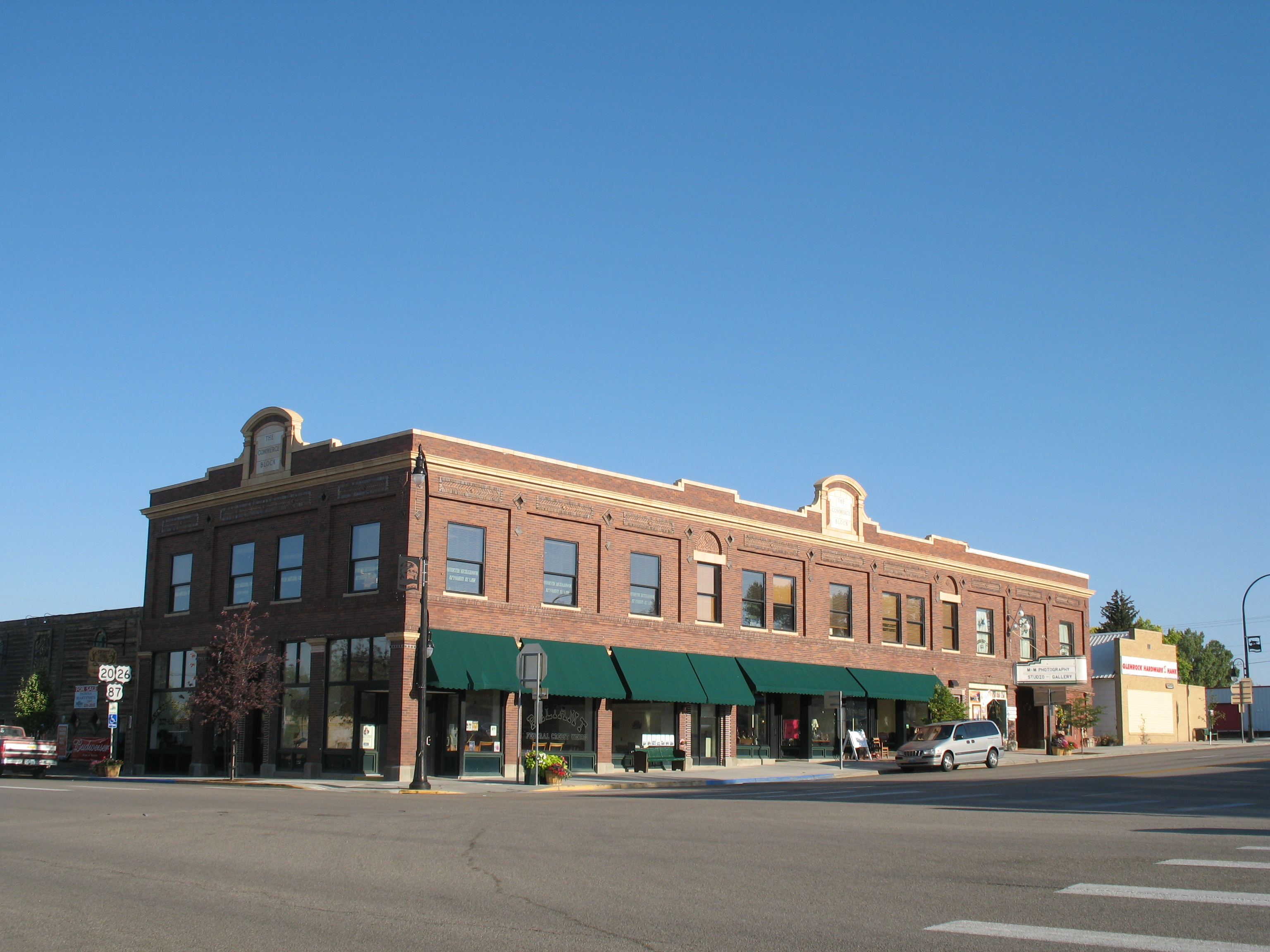
- Commerce Block in Glenrock, September 2012
- Motto: "Big Enough to Enjoy - Small Enough to Care"
- Location of Glenrock in Converse County, Wyoming
- Coordinates: 42°51′12″N 105°52′18″W
- Country: United States
- State: Wyoming
- County: Converse

Area
  - Total: 2.30 sq mi (5.96 km^{2})
  - Land: 2.30 sq mi (5.96 km^{2})
  - Water: 0 sq mi (0.00 km^{2})
- Elevation: 5,020 ft (1,530 m)

Population (2020)
  - Total: 2,420
  - Density: 1,118.8/sq mi (431.97/km^{2})
- Time zone: UTC-7 (Mountain (MST))
  - Summer (DST): UTC-6 (MDT)
- ZIP code: 82637
- Area code: 307
- FIPS code: 56-32435
- GNIS feature ID: 2412687
- Website: glenrock.org

Glenrock is a town in Converse County, Wyoming, United States. The population was 2,420 at the 2020 census.

== History ==
Glenrock, known as Deer Creek Station, had its beginning as a mail and stage station along the Oregon Trail. The station served as a stopping point along the trail and was a vital supply point for thousands of emigrants as they traveled westward. A significant number of industries were established after 1889 and expanded the growth and economy of many communities like Glenrock in central Wyoming.

=== Historical Sites ===
Rock in the Glen

- This landmark has been viewed by an estimated 350,000 immigrants that have migrated westward since the mid-1800s. In 1812, it was first discovered by American fur trappers during a creation of a fur trapping route. This trappers trail has known many names depending upon the group traveling upon it. These names include the Oregon, California, and Mormon trails.

Mormon Mines

- On June 10, 1847, the first group of Mormons reached Deer Creek in the Glenrock region. A mere ten days later, a coal mine produced the first recorded coal mined in the Wyoming territory.

Deer Creek Station

- Originally, Deer Creek Station stood as a pioneer and Indian trading post in the 1850s and as a relay terminal for the overland stage line. Ten years later in 1860, it would become a "home station for the pony express." In 1861, the station became incorporated into the telegraph system. On October 18, 1861, the telegrapher at Deer Creek Station helped to send along the first relayed message to Cleveland, Ohio from the West. As the telegraphy began to replace the pony express, the relationship between Indians and the U.S. Government worsened in the Glenrock region. Over the course of three years, from 1862–1866, Deer Creek Station stood as a military outpost. With few troops stationed in the fort, in 1866, Indians burned it down, this includes the telegraph station located in Deer Creek Station. It was never rebuilt as traffic on the old trails dwindled and it became part of the past.

=== Glenrock train wreck ===
September 27, 1923 – near Glenrock, Wyoming, soon after the washout of Chicago, Burlington and Quincy Railroad's bridge over Cole Creek, a passenger train fell through the washout, killing 30 of the train's 66 passengers. This marked the worst railroad accident in Wyoming's history.

== Geography ==
According to the United States Census Bureau, the town has a total area of 2.28 square miles (5.91 km^{2}), all land.

== Demographics ==
Historical population
Census	Pop.	Note	%±
1920	1,003		—
1930	810		−19.2%
1940	1,014		25.2%
1950	1,110		9.5%
1960	1,584		42.7%
1970	1,515		−4.4%
1980	2,736		80.6%
1990	2,153		−21.3%
2000	2,231		3.6%
2010	2,576		15.5%
2020	2,420		−6.1%
2023 (est.)	2,421	▲	0.0%

=== 2010 census ===
As of the census of 2010, there were 2,576 people, 1,102 households, and 713 families residing in the town. The population density was 1,129.8 inhabitants per square mile (436.2/km^{2}). There were 1,201 housing units at an average density of 526.8 per square mile (203.4/km^{2}). The racial makeup of the town was 96.0% White, 0.5% African American, 0.9% Native American, 0.4% Asian, 0.9% from other races, and 1.3% from two or more races. Hispanic or Latino of any race were 4.9% of the population.

There were 1,102 households, of which 29.7% had children under the age of 18 living with them, 50.5% were married couples living together, 9.6% had a female householder with no husband present, 4.5% had a male householder with no wife present, and 35.3% were non-families. 29.8% of all households were made up of individuals, and 13.3% had someone living alone who was 65 years of age or older. The average household size was 2.32 and the average family size was 2.85.

The median age in the town was 41.3 years. 23.5% of residents were under the age of 18; 8.2% were between the ages of 18 and 24; 22.8% were from 25 to 44; 27.7% were from 45 to 64; and 17.7% were 65 years of age or older. The gender makeup of the town was 51.7% male and 48.3% female.

=== 2000 census ===
As of the census of 2000, there were 2,231 people, 925 households, and 641 families residing in the town. The population density was 1,155.3 people per square mile (446.3/km^{2}). There were 1,131 housing units at an average density of 585.7 per square mile (226.3/km^{2}). The racial makeup of the town was 94.53% White, 0.31% African American, 1.61% Native American, 0.40% Asian, 0.04% Pacific Islander, 1.03% from other races, and 2.06% from two or more races. Hispanic or Latino of any race were 3.81% of the population.

There were 925 households, out of which 33.8% had children under the age of 18 living with them, 54.1% were married couples living together, 11.5% had a female householder with no husband present, and 30.6% were non-families. 26.7% of all households were made up of individuals, and 11.9% had someone living alone who was 65 years of age or older. The average household size was 2.41 and the average family size was 2.89.

In the town, the population was spread out, with 28.8% under the age of 18, 6.6% from 18 to 24, 25.6% from 25 to 44, 25.8% from 45 to 64, and 13.2% who were 65 years of age or older. The median age was 38 years. For every 100 females, there were 96.2 males. For every 100 females age 18 and over, there were 89.4 males.

The median income for a household in the town was $32,300, and the median income for a family was $40,927. Males had a median income of $32,778 versus $18,795 for females. The per capita income for the town was $17,088. About 11.4% of families and 13.0% of the population were below the poverty line, including 18.7% of those under age 18 and 6.4% of those age 65 or over.

== Education ==
Public education in the town of Glenrock is provided by Converse County School District #2. The district has three campuses – Grant Elementary School (grades PreK-3), Glenrock Intermediate School (grades 4-6), and Glenrock Junior/Senior High School (grades 7-12).

Glenrock has a public library, a branch of the Converse County Library

== Attractions and tourism ==
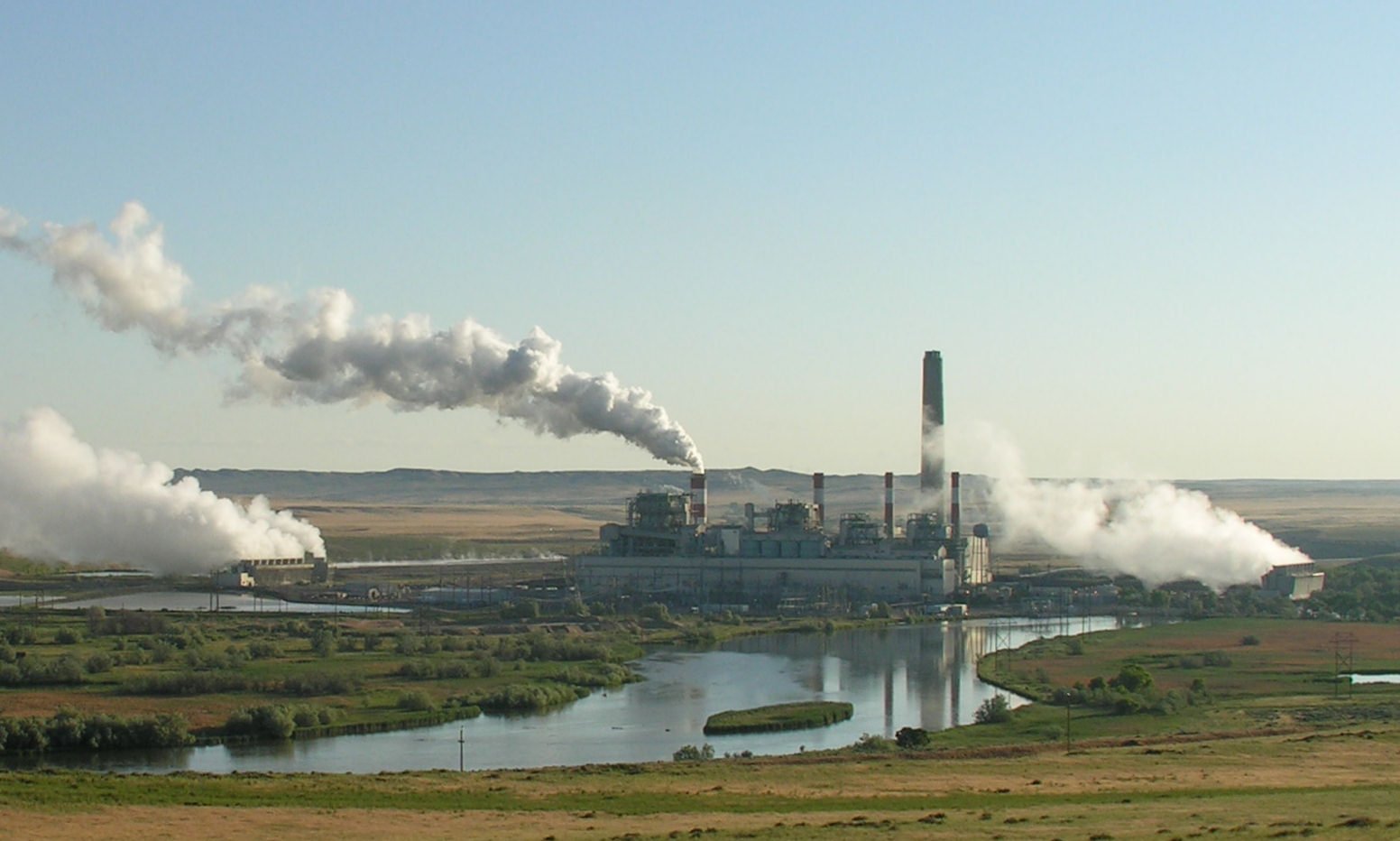
Dave Johnston power plant, a large coal-fired generating station at Glenrock, is owned by PacifiCorp.

Outdoor recreation opportunities are plentiful in the area surrounding Glenrock, as the Laramie Mountains, Medicine Bow National Forest, and the Platte River are nearby.

The Deer Creek Days Festival, Jamborees, and outdoor activities attract visitors to the town.

Other attractions include:

- Deer Creek Museum
- Glenrock Golf Course
- Paleon Museum
- The Glenrock Potato Man
- Art in the Park

== Major highways ==
- I-25 - north–south Interstate running from New Mexico to Wyoming; runs concurrent with US-87 through Glenrock.
- I-25 BL - Alternate I-25 Business Route running through the business district of town.
- US 26 (Old Glenrock Hwy) - runs east–west through center of Glenrock.
- US 87 - runs east–west through area, concurrent with I-25.
- WYO 95 - runs north out of Glenrock to Rolling Hills.

== Notable people ==
- Jim Anderson (born 1943) former and the Wyoming House of Representatives (1997–2000) and current member of the Wyoming Senate.
- Neva Egan (1914–2011), the first First Lady of Alaska; taught public school music in Glenrock
- John J. McIntyre (1904–1974), United States Representative from Wyoming; practiced law in Glenrock
- [[Elaine M. Alphin|Elaine M. Alphin]] (1955–2014), American author of more than 30 books for children and young adults, passed away in Glenrock

== See also ==
- List of municipalities in Wyoming
