= Douglas, Wyoming =

- City
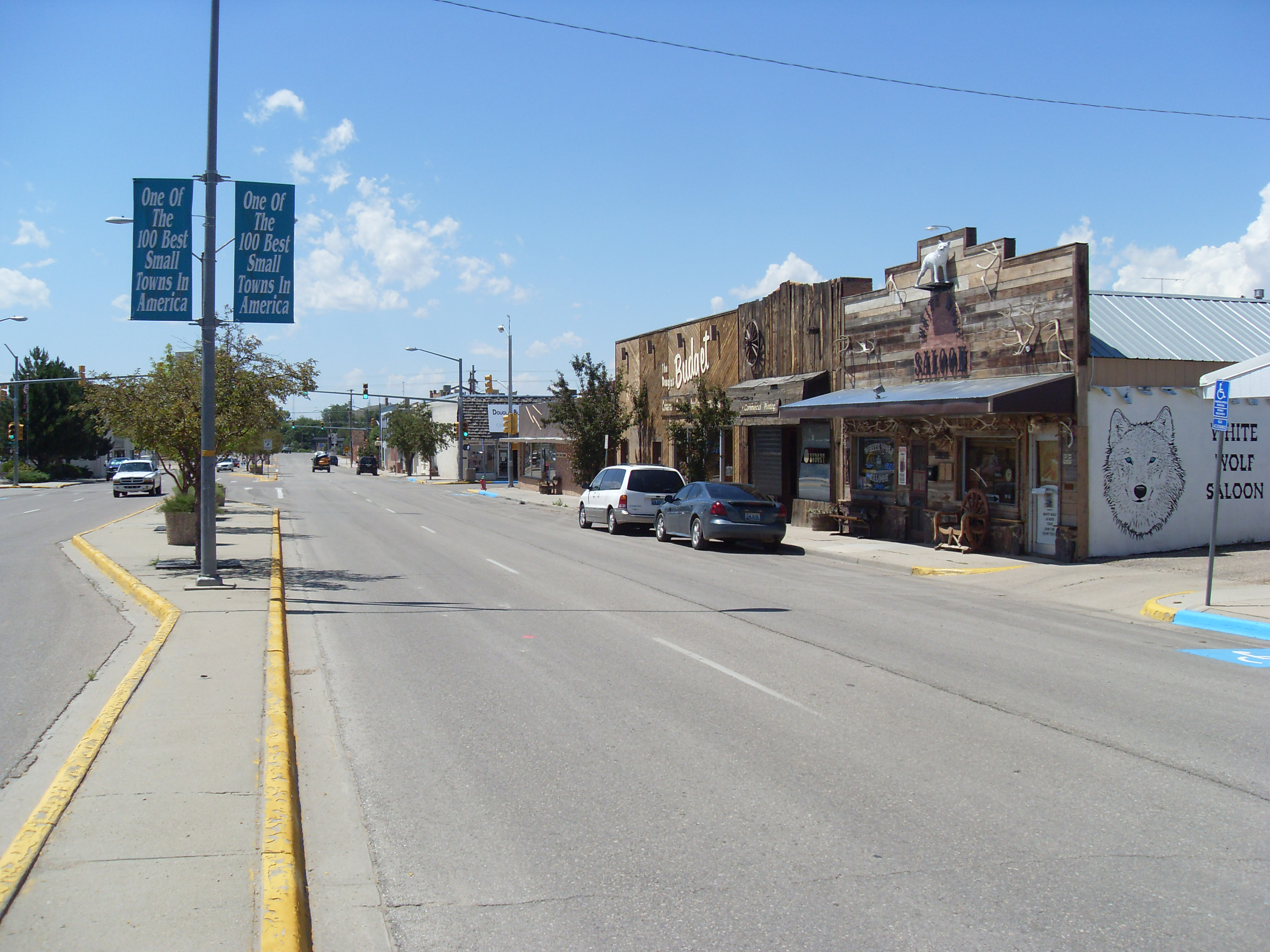
- Center Street (city center), view to the west
- Motto: "Home of the Jackalope"
- Location of Douglas in Converse County, Wyoming.

- Location of Douglas, Wyoming
- Coordinates: 42°45′05″N 105°23′28″W
- Country: United States
- State: Wyoming
- County: Converse

Area
  - Total: 6.66 sq mi (17.25 km^{2})
  - Land: 6.50 sq mi (16.84 km^{2})
  - Water: 0.16 sq mi (0.41 km^{2})
- Elevation: 4,836 ft (1,474 m)

Population (2020)
  - Total: 6,386
  - Density: 978.7/sq mi (377.87/km^{2})
- Time zone: UTC−7 (Mountain (MST))
  - Summer (DST): UTC−6 (MDT)
- ZIP code: 82633
- Area code: 307
- FIPS code: 56-21125
- GNIS feature ID: 2410350
- Website: City of Douglas Wyoming

Douglas is a city in and the county seat of Converse County, Wyoming, United States. The population was 6,386 at the 2020 census. It is the home of the Wyoming State Fair.

== History ==
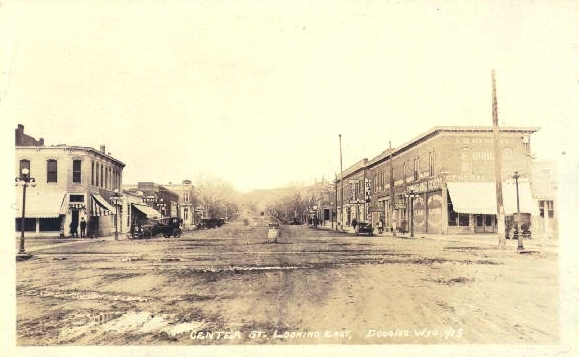
Center St., looking east (1920s)

Douglas was platted in 1886 when the Wyoming Central Railway (later the Chicago and North Western Transportation Company) established a railway station; the settlement had been in existence since 1867 when Fort Fetterman was built and was first known as "Tent City" before it was officially named "Douglas", after Senator Stephen A. Douglas. It served as a supply point, warehousing and retail, for surrounding cattle ranches, as well as servicing railway crews, cowboys and the troops of the U.S. Army stationed at Fort Fetterman. It was incorporated in 1887.

Douglas was the home of a World War II prisoner of war camp. Its former railroad passenger depot is listed on the National Register of Historic Places.

== Geography ==
According to the United States Census Bureau, the city has a total area of 4.76 square miles (12.33 km^{2}), of which 4.58 square miles (11.86 km^{2}) is land and 0.18 square miles (0.47 km^{2}) is water.

=== Climate ===
Douglas has a semi-arid climate (Köppen climate classification BSk).

Climate data for Douglas, Wyoming (Converse County Airport), 1991–2020 normals, extremes 1999–present
Month	Jan	Feb	Mar	Apr	May	Jun	Jul	Aug	Sep	Oct	Nov	Dec	Year
Record high °F (°C)	71 (22)	68 (20)	81 (27)	87 (31)	97 (36)	102 (39)	105 (41)	103 (39)	101 (38)	89 (32)	76 (24)	71 (22)	105 (41)
Mean maximum °F (°C)	57.1 (13.9)	58.2 (14.6)	70.9 (21.6)	79.3 (26.3)	86.5 (30.3)	95.6 (35.3)	99.9 (37.7)	98.6 (37.0)	93.9 (34.4)	82.3 (27.9)	70.9 (21.6)	59.0 (15.0)	100.5 (38.1)
Mean daily maximum °F (°C)	39.0 (3.9)	40.0 (4.4)	50.1 (10.1)	57.7 (14.3)	67.6 (19.8)	79.6 (26.4)	87.9 (31.1)	86.3 (30.2)	75.7 (24.3)	60.5 (15.8)	48.7 (9.3)	38.7 (3.7)	61.0 (16.1)
Daily mean °F (°C)	25.7 (−3.5)	26.4 (−3.1)	36.6 (2.6)	43.6 (6.4)	53.2 (11.8)	64.1 (17.8)	71.6 (22.0)	69.5 (20.8)	59.1 (15.1)	45.4 (7.4)	34.8 (1.6)	25.7 (−3.5)	46.3 (8.0)
Mean daily minimum °F (°C)	12.4 (−10.9)	12.8 (−10.7)	23.2 (−4.9)	30.0 (−1.1)	38.9 (3.8)	48.6 (9.2)	55.3 (12.9)	52.6 (11.4)	42.6 (5.9)	30.4 (−0.9)	21.0 (−6.1)	12.6 (−10.8)	31.7 (−0.2)
Mean minimum °F (°C)	−13.3 (−25.2)	−13.1 (−25.1)	3.5 (−15.8)	14.1 (−9.9)	24.9 (−3.9)	35.6 (2.0)	45.3 (7.4)	41.7 (5.4)	29.6 (−1.3)	10.7 (−11.8)	−1.3 (−18.5)	−14.1 (−25.6)	−22.3 (−30.2)
Record low °F (°C)	−33 (−36)	−33 (−36)	−20 (−29)	−7 (−22)	16 (−9)	29 (−2)	40 (4)	31 (−1)	14 (−10)	−15 (−26)	−25 (−32)	−29 (−34)	−33 (−36)
Average precipitation inches (mm)	0.56 (14)	0.74 (19)	1.06 (27)	1.88 (48)	2.69 (68)	1.70 (43)	1.30 (33)	0.97 (25)	1.20 (30)	1.39 (35)	0.56 (14)	0.46 (12)	14.51 (368)
Average snowfall inches (cm)	7.6 (19)	10.8 (27)	10.8 (27)	7.7 (20)	1.6 (4.1)	0.0 (0.0)	0.0 (0.0)	0.0 (0.0)	1.5 (3.8)	4.0 (10)	5.8 (15)	9.2 (23)	59.0 (150)
Average precipitation days (≥ 0.01 in)	5.9	5.7	6.5	9.7	10.6	8.4	6.6	6.3	7.3	6.3	4.3	6.0	83.6
Average snowy days (≥ 0.1 in)	5.1	5.4	4.9	3.6	1.0	0.0	0.0	0.0	0.2	1.7	3.0	5.7	30.6
Source 1: NOAA
Source 2: National Weather Service (mean maxima/minima 2006–2020)

== Demographics ==
Historical population
Census	Pop.	Note	%±
1890	491		—
1900	734		49.5%
1910	2,246		206.0%
1920	2,294		2.1%
1930	1,917		−16.4%
1940	2,205		15.0%
1950	2,544		15.4%
1960	2,822		10.9%
1970	2,677		−5.1%
1980	6,030		125.3%
1990	5,076		−15.8%
2000	5,288		4.2%
2010	6,120		15.7%
2020	6,386		4.3%
2023 (est.)	6,449		1.0%
U.S. Decennial Census; 1890–2000 census

=== 2020 census ===
As of the 2020 census, Douglas had a population of 6,386. The population density was 977.3 people per square mile. About 98.8% of residents lived in urban areas, while 1.2% lived in rural areas.

The median age was 37.0 years; 8.1% of residents were under age 5, 26.6% were under 18, and 14.7% were 65 or older. For every 100 females there were 102.8 males, and for every 100 females age 18 and over there were 101.9 males; females comprised 48.1% of the population and males 51.9%.

There were 2,675 households in Douglas, 32.7% of which had children under the age of 18 living in them. Of all households, 44.7% were married-couple households, 22.7% were households with a male householder and no spouse or partner present, and 25.2% were households with a female householder and no spouse or partner present. About 31.7% of all households were made up of individuals and 11.5% had someone living alone who was 65 years of age or older.

There were 3,058 housing units, of which 12.5% were vacant. The homeowner vacancy rate was 2.1% and the rental vacancy rate was 18.2%.

Racial composition as of the 2020 census
Race	Number	Percent
White	5,577	87.3%
Black or African American	30	0.5%
American Indian and Alaska Native	52	0.8%
Asian	37	0.6%
Native Hawaiian and Other Pacific Islander	3	0.0%
Some other race	258	4.0%
Two or more races	429	6.7%
Hispanic or Latino (of any race)	658	10.3%

=== 2021 American Community Survey estimates ===
The ancestry of Douglas in 2021 was 27.3% German, 10.6% Irish, 10.6% English, 5.1% Norwegian, 1.6% Italian, 1.2% French, 1.2% Polish, and 0.8% Scottish.

The median household income was $71,155, families had $95,123, married couples had $101,618, and non-families had $36,346. The per capita income was $37,955. 11.4% of the people were in poverty, with 23.5% of people under 18 being in poverty, 8.5% from 18 to 64, and 3.0% of people over 65 in poverty.

== Government ==
Douglas has a mayor and city council along with an appointed City Administrator. There are four councilmembers.

Kim Pexton was elected mayor in a special election in 2024. She was previously appointed to the position following the death of René Kemper. Kemper was elected to a second term in 2022.

== Culture ==
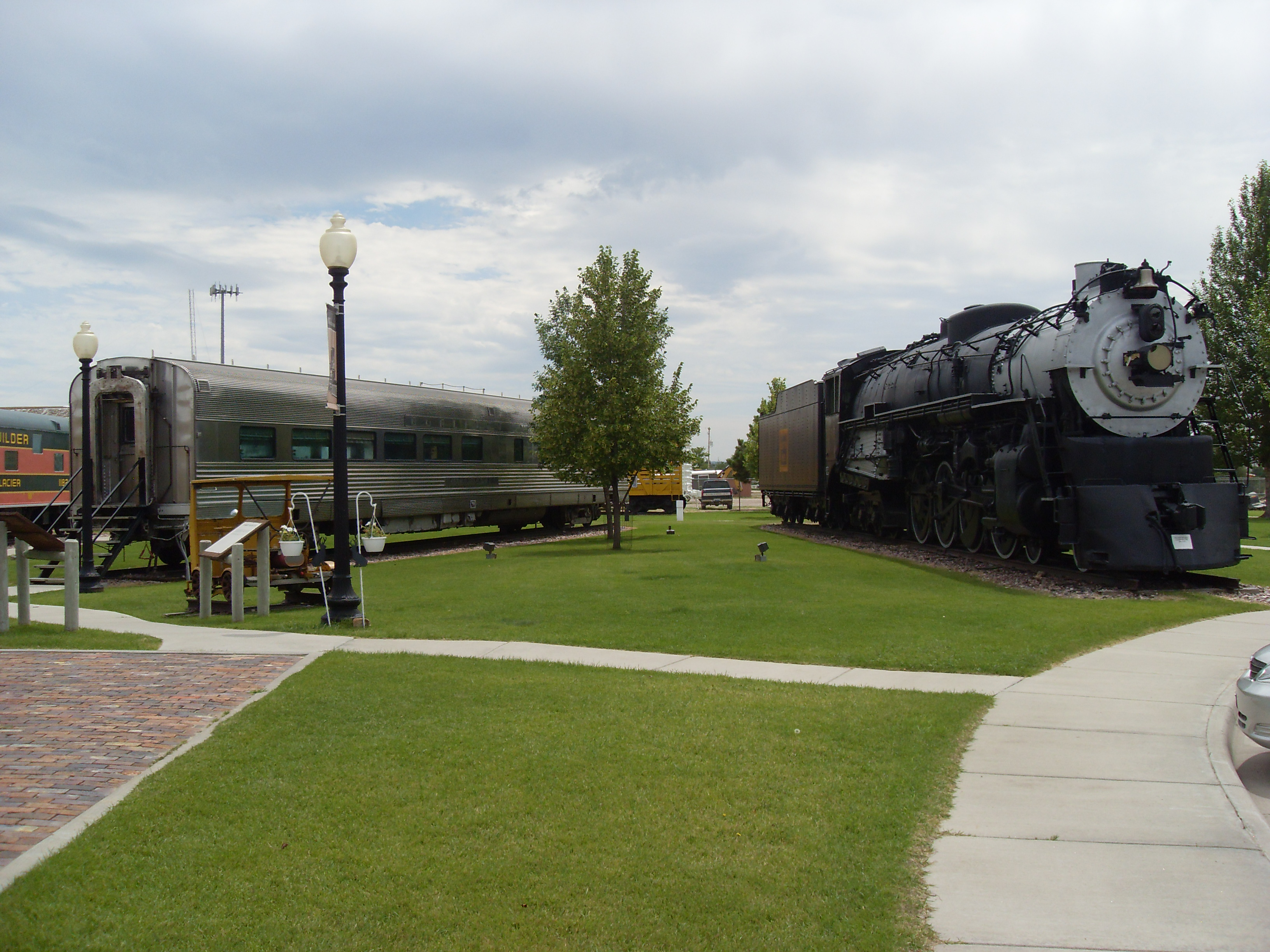
Part of the exhibition at the Douglas Railroad Interpretive Center (left: the CB&Q dining car #196; right: the CB&Q steam locomotive #5633.)

Douglas is located on the banks of the North Platte River, and is named for U.S. Senator Stephen A. Douglas. The city grew after it was designated a stop on the Fremont, Elkhorn and Missouri Valley Railroad. Railroads brought settlers and pioneers west; some stayed and others continued on. Douglas' location affords excellent access to nearby sights. Medicine Bow National Forest is located nearby, as is Thunder Basin National Grassland and Ayres Natural Bridge.

The former Fremont, Elkhorn and Missouri Valley Railroad Passenger Depot in Douglas is included on the National Register of Historic Places. The Douglas Chamber of Commerce, part of the Douglas Railroad Interpretive Center is located in the depot. The free of charge exhibition outside contains eight railroad vehicles, one steam locomotive with tender and seven cars.

=== Wyoming State Fair ===
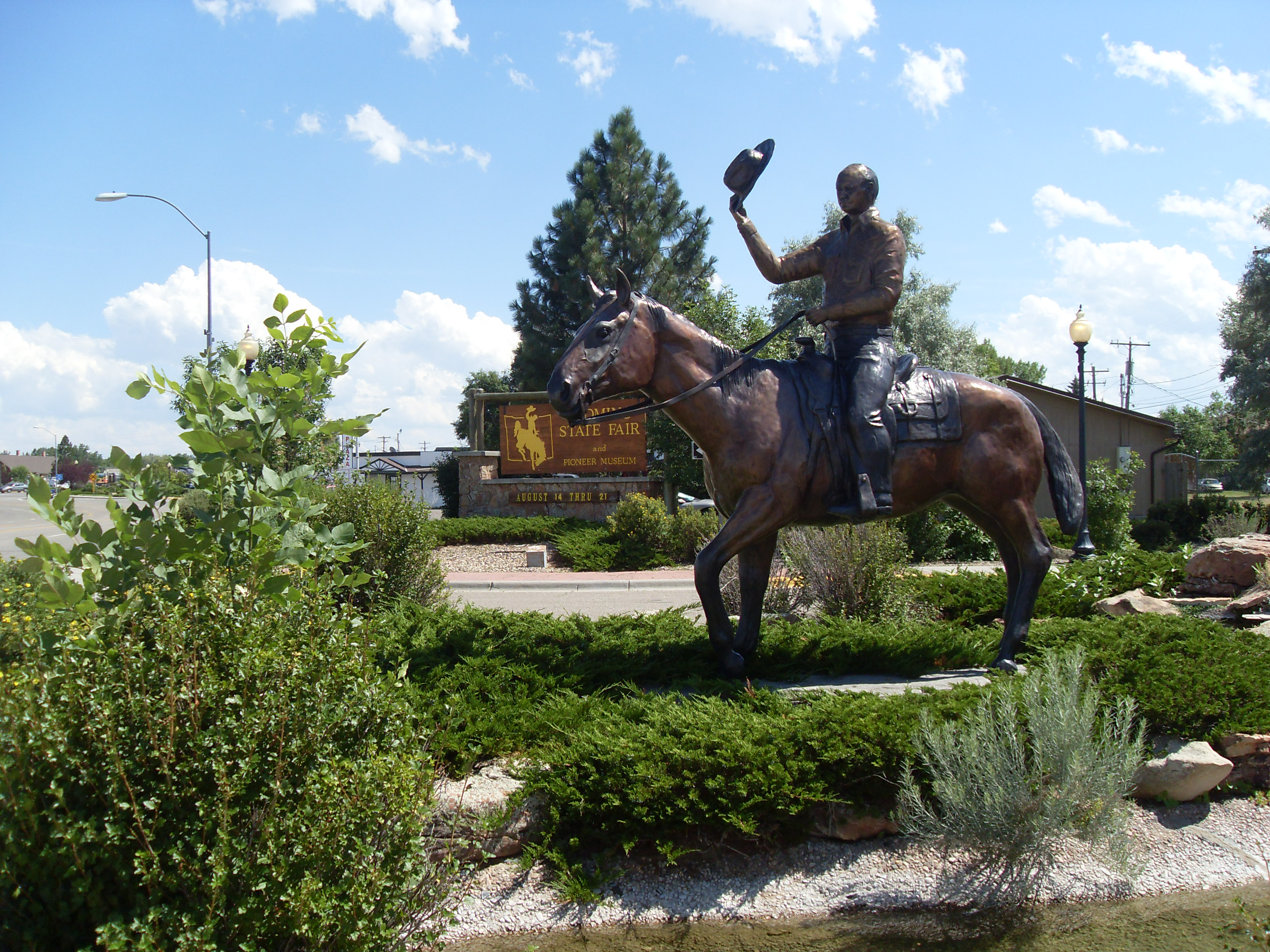
Wyoming State Fair Main Entrance

Each August Douglas hosts the Wyoming State Fair. The fair includes a carnival midway, live entertainment, and a rodeo. On August 12, 2009, the fair hosted country music star John Anderson. The centennial fair in 2012 attracted sixty thousand persons, large by Wyoming standards; the Dierks Bentley concert was the first ever sold-out show in the fair.

The 101st fair opened in Douglas on August 10, 2013; it corresponds with the centennial of the Wyoming State 4-H Club, an active group in the annual fair. Fair performers included country musicians Hunter Hayes and Brantley Gilbert.

=== Horse culture ===
Since Fort Fetterman days, Douglas has been a center of American horse culture. The first winner of American racing's Triple Crown, thoroughbred Sir Barton, is buried here. The Wyoming State Fair is known for its rodeo and animal competitions. Also on the fairgrounds is the Wyoming Pioneer Memorial Museum, a collection of pioneer and Native American relics pertaining to the history of Converse County.

=== Jackalopes ===
In 1932, the jackalope legend in the United States was attributed by The New York Times to Douglas Herrick (1920−2003) of Douglas, and thus the city was named the "Home of the Jackalope" by the state of Wyoming in 1985. Douglas has issued Jackalope Hunting licenses to tourists. The tags are good for hunting during official Jackalope season, which occurs for only one day, June 31.

According to the Douglas Chamber of Commerce, a 1930s hunting trip for jackrabbits led to the idea of a Jackalope. Herrick and his brother had studied taxidermy by mail order as teenagers. When the brothers returned from a hunting trip, Herrick tossed a jackrabbit carcass into the taxidermy shop, which rested beside a pair of deer antlers. The accidental combination of animal forms sparked Douglas Herrick's idea for a jackalope.

== Education ==
Public education in the city of Douglas is provided by Converse County School District #1. Zoned campuses include Douglas Primary School (grades k-1), Douglas Intermediate School (grades 2-3), Douglas Upper Elementary School (grades 4-5), Douglas Middle School (grades 6-8), Douglas High school (grades 9-12). Douglas is also home to the branch campus of Eastern Wyoming College, one of the state's seven community colleges.

Douglas has a public library, a branch of the Converse County Library.

== Transportation ==
=== Highways ===
- I-25 North-South Interstate running from New Mexico to Wyoming; runs concurrent with US 87 through Douglas.
- I-25 BL I-25 Business, an alternate Business Route of I-25, running through the center of Douglas.
- WYO 59
- WYO 91
- WYO 93
- WYO 94
- WYO 96

=== Transit ===
Intercity bus service to the city is provided by Express Arrow.

=== Airport ===
Air service is available 58 miles west of Douglas at Casper/Natrona County International Airport. The airport is located west of Casper, just off of US Highway 26. Passenger flights are offered by United Express (SkyWest Airlines), Delta Connection (SkyWest Airlines), and Allegiant Airlines.

=== Rail ===
The Union Pacific line between Omaha and Casper runs through Douglas.

== Radio stations ==
- KKTY (AM) 1470 and 93.3FM, Classic Hits, Wyoming Cowboys, Denver Broncos, Colorado Rockies
- KKTY-FM 100.1, Full-Service Country
- KKTS-FM 99.3, Hot Adult Contemporary

== Notable people ==
- George H. Cross (1854–1946), member of the Wyoming Senate
- Dave Edwards (1938–2013), member of the Wyoming House of Representatives
- Harriet Hageman (born 1962), U.S. representative for Wyoming
- Mike Sullivan (born 1939), governor of Wyoming and U.S. ambassador to Ireland
