= Ranchester, Wyoming =

- Town
- Location of Ranchester in Sheridan County, Wyoming
- Coordinates: 44°54′27″N 107°10′02″W
- Country: United States
- State: Wyoming
- County: Sheridan
- Incorporated: 1911

Government
  - Mayor: Peter Clark

Area
  - Total: 0.71 sq mi (1.84 km^{2})
  - Land: 0.71 sq mi (1.84 km^{2})
  - Water: 0 sq mi (0.00 km^{2})
- Elevation: 3,770 ft (1,150 m)

Population (2020)
  - Total: 1,064
  - Density: 1,467.5/sq mi (566.62/km^{2})
- Time zone: UTC-7 (Mountain (MST))
  - Summer (DST): UTC-6 (MDT)
- ZIP codes: 82839, 82844
- Area code: 307
- FIPS code: 56-63755
- GNIS feature ID: 2412525
- Website: ranchesterwy.gov

Ranchester is a town in Sheridan County, Wyoming, United States. The population was 1,064 at the 2020 census.

== History ==
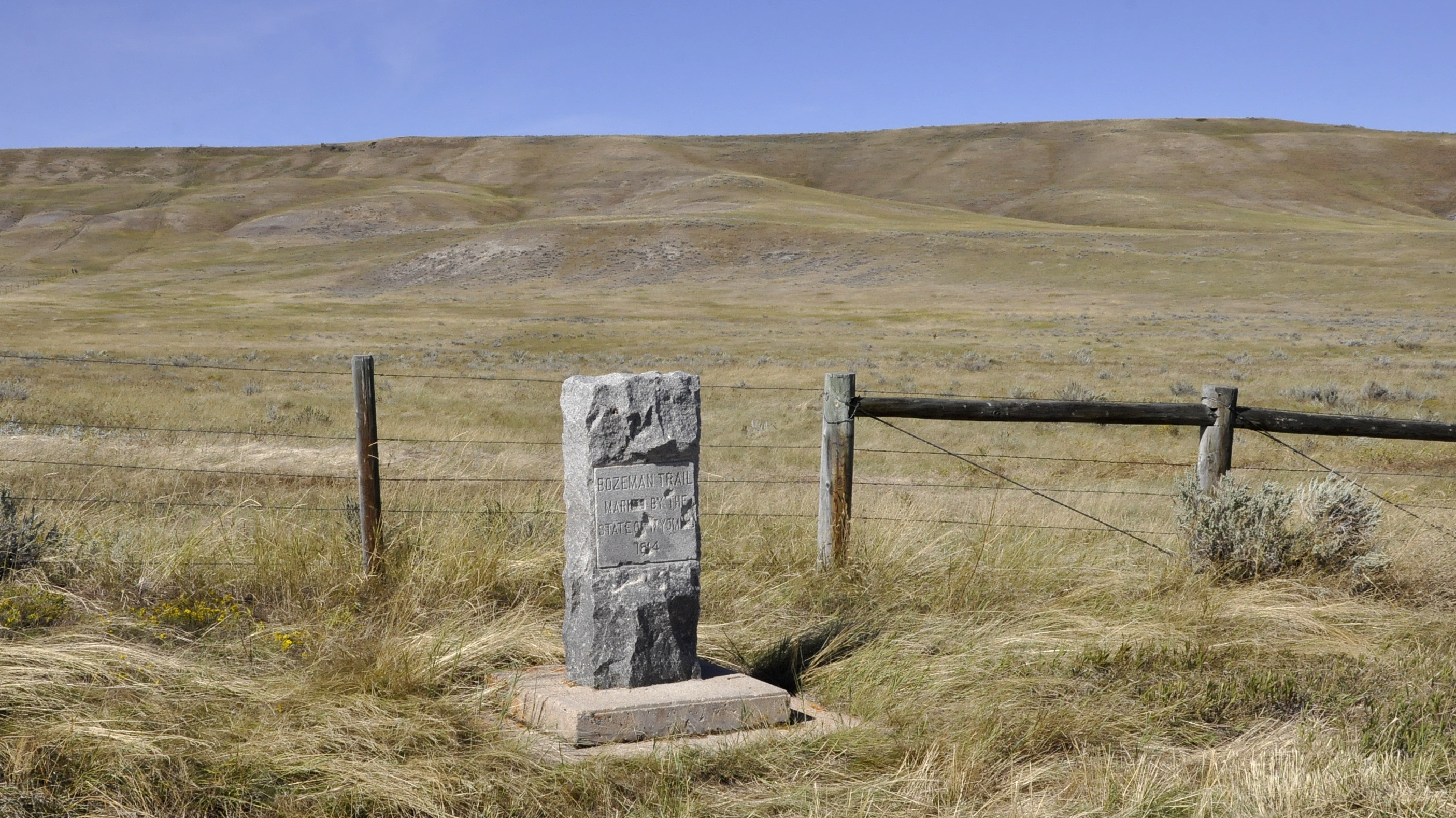
Bozeman Trail

Waterfall at Casper's Rotary Park, at the base of Casper Mountain

The Chicago, Burlington and Quincy Railroad came through the area in 1894. The townsite was first used when a railroad tie mill was created. The timber came from the Bighorn Mountains and a 35-mile long log flume was constructed to float the lumber to the mill. At least seven men died during the construction of the flume, four to explosion and three to rock slides. The railroad cancelled its contract for ties in 1912.

The town was named by S.H. Hardin who owned the O-4 Bar Ranch. The Englishman combined "ranch" with "chester" due to many towns in England ending that way. It was incorporated in 1911. Governor Joseph M. Carey attended a picnic celebrating the new town. The picnic included racing, bucking contests, and contests on the river.

During the 1980s the town benefited from a coal boom.

== Geography ==
The Bighorn Scenic Byway passes through town.

According to the United States Census Bureau, the town has a total area of 0.61 square miles (1.58 km^{2}), all land.

== Demographics ==
Historical population
Census	Pop.	Note	%±
1920	147		—
1930	155		5.4%
1940	189		21.9%
1950	251		32.8%
1960	235		−6.4%
1970	208		−11.5%
1980	655		214.9%
1990	676		3.2%
2000	701		3.7%
2010	855		22.0%
2020	1,064		24.4%
U.S. Decennial Census

=== 2010 census ===
As of the census of 2010, there were 855 people, 312 households, and 236 families living in the town. The population density was 1,401.6 inhabitants per square mile (541.2/km^{2}). There were 332 housing units at an average density of 544.3 per square mile (210.2/km^{2}). The racial makeup of the town was 90.3% White, 7.3% Native American, 0.8% Asian, 1.1% from other races, and 0.6% from two or more races. Hispanic or Latino of any race were 3.6% of the population.

There were 312 households, of which 42.6% had children under the age of 18 living with them, 55.8% were married couples living together, 14.7% had a female householder with no husband present, 5.1% had a male householder with no wife present, and 24.4% were non-families. 17.9% of all households were made up of single individuals, and 7% had someone living alone who was 65 years of age or older. The average household size was 2.74 and the average family size was 3.09.

The median age in the town was 31.7 years. 32.5% of residents were under the age of 18; 7.4% were between the ages of 18 and 24; 25.3% were from 25 to 44; 23.6% were from 45 to 64; and 11.2% were 65 years of age or older. The gender makeup of the town was 50.5% male and 49.5% female.

=== 2000 census ===
As of the census of 2000, there were 701 people, 277 households, and 191 families living in the town. The population density was 1,164.9 people per square mile (451.1/km^{2}). There were 290 housing units at an average density of 481.9 per square mile (186.6/km^{2}). The racial makeup of the town was 89.73% White, 6.42% Native American, 0.14% Pacific Islander, 1.28% from other races, and 2.43% from two or more races. Hispanic or Latino of any race were 4.28% of the population.

There were 277 households, out of which 36.8% had children under the age of 18 living with them, 53.8% were married couples living together, 12.6% had a female householder with no husband present, and 31.0% were non-families. 26.0% of households were made up of single individuals, and 12.6% had someone living alone who was 65 years of age or older. The average household size was 2.53 and the average family size was 3.08.

In the town, the population was spread out, with 30.1% under the age of 18, 7.6% from 18 to 24, 25.0% from 25 to 44, 26.2% from 45 to 64, and 11.1% who were 65 years of age or older. The median age was 37 years. For every 100 females, there were 93.6 males. For every 100 females age 18 and over, there were 90.7 males.

The median income for a household in the town was $36,094, and the median income for a family was $46,389. Males had a median income of $36,875 versus $20,804 for females. The per capita income for the town was $15,421. About 18.2% of families and 16.7% of the population were below the poverty line, including 29.2% of those under age 18 and none of those age 65 or over.

== Government ==
The town has a mayor and town council. In 2026 the mayor was Peter Clark.

== Arts and culture ==
Every July 4th the town holds a Wife-carrying contest. It is an internationally sanctioned event with winners advancing to the North American Championship.

The Connor Battlefield State Historic Site preserves part of the site where General Connor battled an Arapaho village.

The Tongue River Brewing Company has locally crafted beers.

Ranchester has a public library, a branch of the Sheridan County Public Library System.

== Education ==
Public education in the town of Ranchester is provided by Sheridan County School District #1. Tongue River Elementary (grades K–5) and Tongue River Middle School (grades 6–8) are in Ranchester. Tongue River High School (grades 9–12) is in Dayton, Wyoming.

== Media ==
Radio

- KROE AM 930
- KWYO AM 1410
- KHRW FM 92.7
- KLGT FM 96.5
- KYTI FM 93.7
- KZWY FM 94.9
- KZZS FM 98.3
- KZMQ-FM 100.3
- KLQQ FM 104.9

Television

Four television stations serve Ranchester: KTVQ (CBS) from Billings, and KTWO (ABC) from Casper. KSWY (NBC) from Casper, and PBS station K15HK-D, which is a local repeater for KCWC-DT in Lander.

== See also ==
- List of municipalities in Wyoming
