= KSHW-LP =

Television station in Sheridan, Wyoming (1979–2021)

- Sheridan, Wyoming; United States
- Channels: Analog: 6 (VHF)
- Branding: Fox Sports Radio 87.7

Programming
- Affiliations: Fox Sports Radio

Ownership
- Owner: Sheridan Media; (Lovcom, Inc.)
- Sister stations: KROE, KWYO, KZWY, KLQQ, KYTI, KOWY

History
- First air date: July 31, 1979
- Last air date: July 13, 2021
- Former call signs: K06AT (1979–2013)
- Former affiliations: ABC (translator of KTWO-TV, 1979–?); Fox (translator of KHMT, 2007–2010)
- Call sign meaning: Sheridan, Wyoming

Technical information
- Licensing authority: FCC
- Facility ID: 60161
- Class: TX
- ERP: 3 kW
- Transmitter coordinates: 44°37′20″N 107°6′57.04″W

Links
- Public license information: LMS
- Website: sheridanmedia.com/foxsports/

Radio station information
- Frequency: 87.7 MHz

Programming
- Format: Sports radio

KSHW-LP (channel 6) was a low-power television station in Sheridan, Wyoming, United States. The station was last owned by Lovcom, Inc., and last broadcast a sports radio format with programming from Fox Sports Radio.

== History ==
Northern Wyoming Community College was granted a construction permit for a channel 6 translator of ABC affiliate KTWO-TV (channel 2) in Casper, and assigned the call letters K06AT, on July 31, 1979. In 2007, the college transferred the facility to Nexstar Media Group, owner of Fox affiliate KHMT (channel 4) at Hardin, Montana, which the station was rebroadcasting, for no purchase price. The station was off air following the digital transition in 2009.

Lovcom, Inc., owner of the Sheridan Media cluster of radio stations, purchased K06AT from Nexstar in 2010 after being successful in obtaining authorization to move the station to the tower of its KYTI. At that time, it began airing sports radio programming, originally from ESPN Radio, which had previously aired on an HD Radio subchannel of KYTI.

As with all television stations operating as radio stations on channel 6, this station was required to convert to digital on July 13, 2021, ending the FM radio service.

Lovcom had advocated in filings with the Federal Communications Commission for technologies that would allow the transmission of an ATSC 3.0 signal and the FM audio program in the same 6 MHz, but no ATSC 3.0 modification was ever filed for KSHW-LP, which closed at the deadline and had its license deleted.
