= KBTG (FM) =

- Buffalo, Wyoming; United States
- Frequency: 88.3 MHz
- Branding: Buffalo's Traditional Gospel Music

Programming
- Format: Religious; gospel

Ownership
- Owner: Buffalo Baptist Church

History
- First air date: 2023

Technical information
- Licensing authority: FCC
- Facility ID: 766942
- Class: A
- ERP: 220 watts
- HAAT: −70 meters (−230 ft)
- Transmitter coordinates: 44°20′7.1″N 106°41′14.8″W

Links
- Public license information: Public file; LMS
- Website: buffalobaptist.org

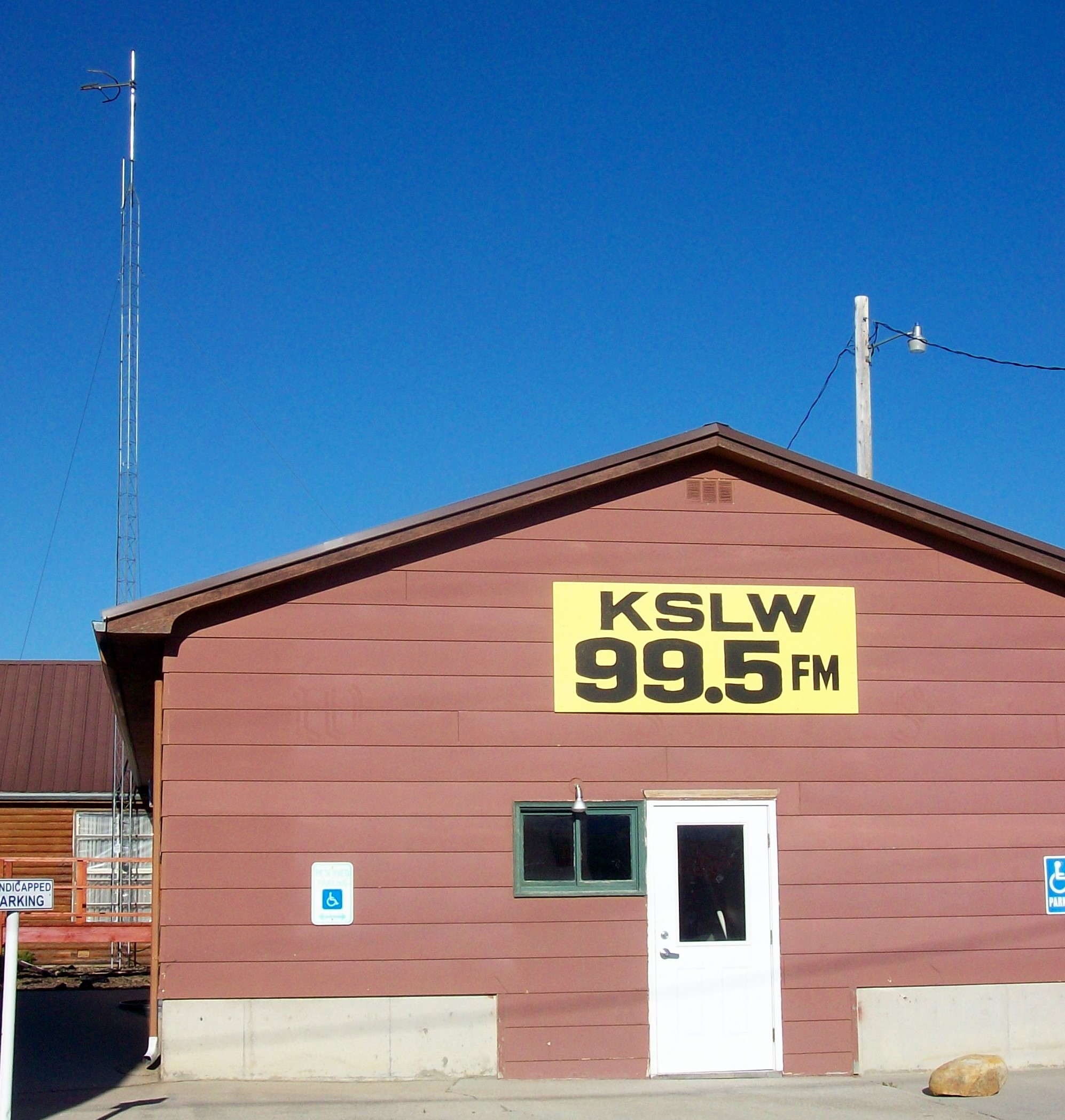
The radio station's former location on Klondike Drive, in Buffalo, along with the deleted LPFM's former call sign.

KBTG (88.3 FM) is a radio station licensed to Buffalo, Wyoming, United States. The station is owned by Buffalo Baptist Church. It is the second incarnation of the same station, previously on 99.5 FM, and known as KBTG-LP, which fell silent on May 4, 2014. The new incarnation received a license to cover on March 11, 2023.

The transmitting tower was relocated from the previous location on Klondike Drive to the church's grounds south of town near Buffalo High School.

The Federal Communications Commission deleted KBTG-LP's call sign on October 29, 2015, due to the station having been silent for more than twelve months; the station's license was deemed to have expired on May 5, 2015, and was not reinstated.

KBTG has been designated an outlet for Johnson County emergency responses if messages about emergencies need to be heard over the air. Johnson County was working with Big Horn Mountain Radio stations in Buffalo, KBBS, KLGT, and KZZS; all three stations fell silent and have remained silent. The Johnson County Commissioners approved the installation of an emergency generator at the KBTG tower. Because KBTG is limited to 220 watts, the commission was also exploring options of a signal that could cover Kaycee, in southern Johnson County.
