= Buffalo, Wyoming =

- City
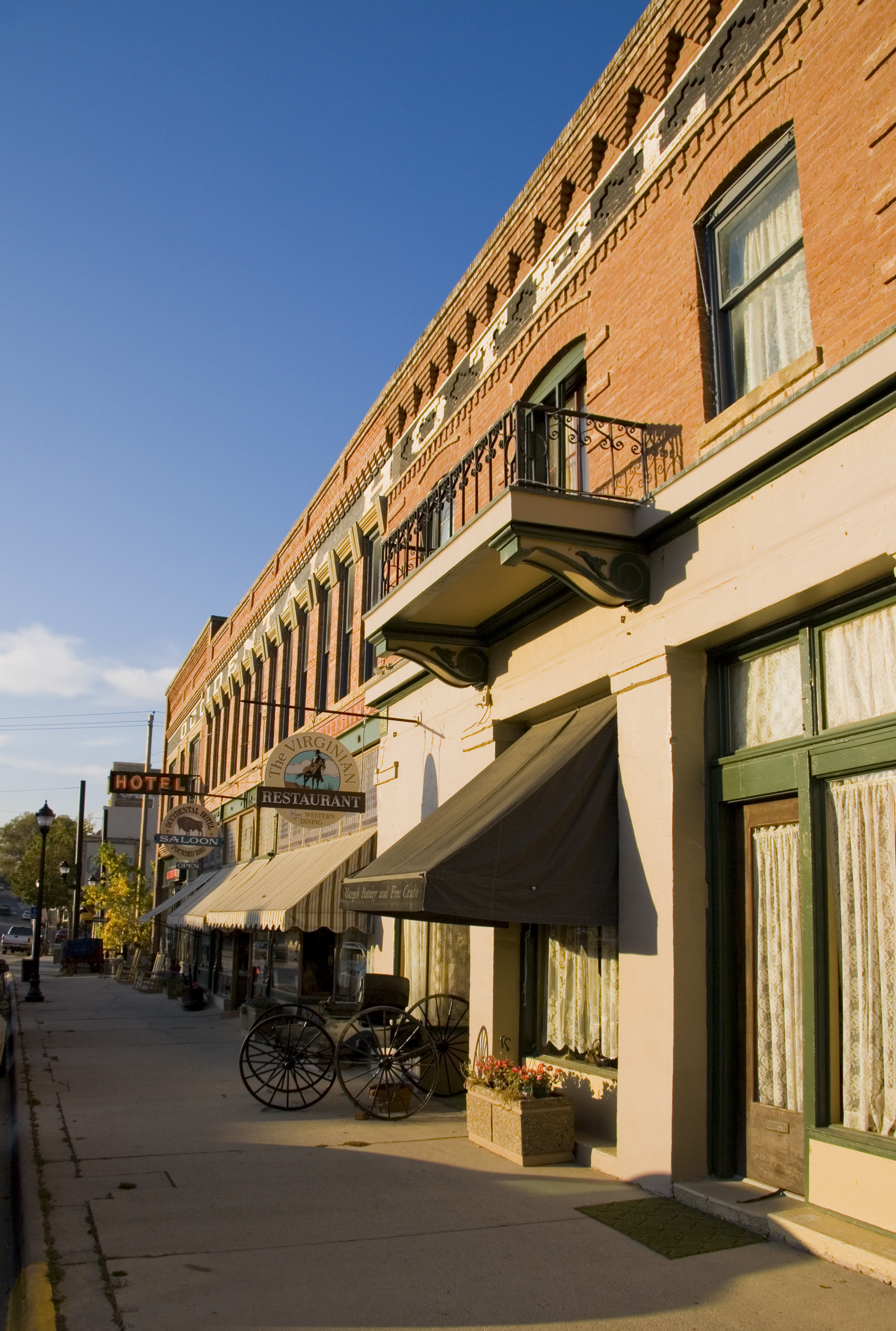
- Occidental Hotel in Buffalo

- Location of Buffalo in Johnson County, Wyoming
- Coordinates: 44°20′18″N 106°43′40″W
- Country: United States
- State: Wyoming
- County: Johnson

Area
  - Total: 4.48 sq mi (11.61 km^{2})
  - Land: 4.48 sq mi (11.61 km^{2})
  - Water: 0 sq mi (0.00 km^{2})
- Elevation: 4,708 ft (1,435 m)

Population (2020)
  - Total: 4,415
  - Density: 1,021.0/sq mi (394.22/km^{2})
- Time zone: UTC−7 (Mountain (MST))
  - Summer (DST): UTC−6 (MDT)
- ZIP codes: 82834, 82840
- Area code: 307
- FIPS code: 56-10685
- GNIS feature ID: 2409934
- Website: Official website

Buffalo is a city in and the county seat of Johnson County, Wyoming, United States. The population was 4,415 at the 2020 census, down from 4,585 at the 2010 census. The city had experienced an economic boom due to methane production from the coal bed methane extraction method used in the Powder River Basin and surrounding areas. With the decline of methane production, Buffalo's population has stabilized since the 2010 Census. Even though energy is a vital part of its economy, agriculture, tourism, and recreation are three other major components. Buffalo is located at the foot of the Bighorn Mountains.

== Demographics ==
Historical population
Census	Pop.	Note	%±
1890	1,087		—
1900	710		−34.7%
1910	1,368		92.7%
1920	1,772		29.5%
1930	1,749		−1.3%
1940	2,302		31.6%
1950	2,674		16.2%
1960	2,907		8.7%
1970	3,394		16.8%
1980	3,799		11.9%
1990	3,302		−13.1%
2000	3,900		18.1%
2010	4,585		17.6%
2020	4,415		−3.7%
2023 (est.)	4,621		4.7%
U.S. Decennial Census

=== 2020 census ===
As of the 2020 census, Buffalo had a population of 4,415. The median age was 46.1 years. 20.9% of residents were under the age of 18 and 26.1% of residents were 65 years of age or older. For every 100 females there were 97.6 males, and for every 100 females age 18 and over there were 97.2 males age 18 and over.

94.7% of residents lived in urban areas, while 5.3% lived in rural areas.

There were 2,006 households in Buffalo, of which 25.1% had children under the age of 18 living in them. Of all households, 43.9% were married-couple households, 21.5% were households with a male householder and no spouse or partner present, and 29.1% were households with a female householder and no spouse or partner present. About 36.9% of all households were made up of individuals and 18.5% had someone living alone who was 65 years of age or older.

There were 2,253 housing units, of which 11.0% were vacant. The homeowner vacancy rate was 2.0% and the rental vacancy rate was 13.0%.

Racial composition as of the 2020 census
Race	Number	Percent
White	4,005	90.7%
Black or African American	20	0.5%
American Indian and Alaska Native	53	1.2%
Asian	15	0.3%
Native Hawaiian and Other Pacific Islander	6	0.1%
Some other race	62	1.4%
Two or more races	254	5.8%
Hispanic or Latino (of any race)	227	5.1%

=== 2010 census ===
As of the census of 2010, there were 4,585 people, 2,080 households, and 1,198 families living in the city. The population density was 1,028.0 inhabitants per square mile (396.9/km^{2}). There were 2,300 housing units at an average density of 515.7 per square mile (199.1/km^{2}). The racial makeup of the city was 95.5% White, 0.3% African American, 1.6% Native American, 0.7% Asian, 0.8% from other races, and 1.2% from two or more races. Hispanic or Latino of any race were 3.5% of the population.

There were 2,080 households, of which 26.8% had children under the age of 18 living with them, 45.4% were married couples living together, 8.7% had a female householder with no husband present, 3.6% had a male householder with no wife present, and 42.4% were non-families. 37.8% of all households were made up of individuals, and 15.3% had someone living alone who was 65 years of age or older. The average household size was 2.17 and the average family size was 2.88.

The median age in the city was 42.2 years. 23% of residents were under the age of 18; 6.6% were between the ages of 18 and 24; 23.4% were from 25 to 44; 27.7% were from 45 to 64; and 19.4% were 65 years of age or older. The gender makeup of the city was 50.1% male and 49.9% female.

=== 2000 census ===
As of the census of 2000, there were 3,900 people, 1,718 households, and 1,042 families living in the city. The population density was 1,104.8 people per square mile (426.6/km^{2}). There were 1,842 housing units at an average density of 521.8 per square mile (201.5/km^{2}). The racial makeup of the city was 96.46% White, 0.10% African American, 0.82% Native American, 0.05% Asian, 0.54% from other races, and 2.03% from two or more races. Hispanic or Latino of any race were 1.82% of the population.

There were 1,718 households, out of which 26.1% had children under the age of 18 living with them, 48.8% were married couples living together, 8.4% had a female householder with no husband present, and 39.3% were non-families. 35.3% of all households were made up of individuals, and 16.1% had someone living alone who was 65 years of age or older. The average household size was 2.21 and the average family size was 2.88.

In the city, the population was spread out, with 23.1% under the age of 18, 5.6% from 18 to 24, 22.6% from 25 to 44, 27.1% from 45 to 64, and 21.5% who were 65 years of age or older. The median age was 44 years. For every 100 females, there were 93.5 males. For every 100 females age 18 and over, there were 89.4 males.

The median income for a household in the city was $29,392, and the median income for a family was $40,683. Males had a median income of $28,716 versus $19,688 for females. The per capita income for the city was $19,054. About 6.7% of families and 10.4% of the population were below the poverty line, including 7.0% of those under age 18 and 12.4% of those age 65 or over.

== Geography ==
According to the United States Census Bureau, the city has a total area of 4.46 square miles (11.55 km^{2}), all land.

=== Climate ===
According to the Köppen Climate Classification system, Buffalo has a cold semi-arid climate, abbreviated "BSk" on climate maps. The hottest temperature recorded in Buffalo was 106 °F (41 °C) on August 5, 1979, while the coldest temperature recorded was −40 °F (−40 °C) on January 17, 1930.

Climate data for Buffalo, Wyoming, 1991–2020 normals, extremes 1899–2020
Month	Jan	Feb	Mar	Apr	May	Jun	Jul	Aug	Sep	Oct	Nov	Dec	Year
Record high °F (°C)	71 (22)	77 (25)	78 (26)	88 (31)	91 (33)	102 (39)	105 (41)	106 (41)	101 (38)	91 (33)	80 (27)	71 (22)	106 (41)
Mean maximum °F (°C)	58.8 (14.9)	57.6 (14.2)	68.3 (20.2)	76.0 (24.4)	83.2 (28.4)	91.0 (32.8)	96.4 (35.8)	94.6 (34.8)	90.9 (32.7)	80.6 (27.0)	67.7 (19.8)	58.5 (14.7)	97.3 (36.3)
Mean daily maximum °F (°C)	36.0 (2.2)	36.5 (2.5)	46.5 (8.1)	53.4 (11.9)	62.4 (16.9)	73.0 (22.8)	82.8 (28.2)	81.8 (27.7)	71.8 (22.1)	57.2 (14.0)	44.9 (7.2)	36.3 (2.4)	56.9 (13.8)
Daily mean °F (°C)	23.4 (−4.8)	24.2 (−4.3)	33.2 (0.7)	40.5 (4.7)	49.7 (9.8)	59.5 (15.3)	68.0 (20.0)	66.3 (19.1)	56.7 (13.7)	43.4 (6.3)	32.1 (0.1)	23.7 (−4.6)	43.4 (6.3)
Mean daily minimum °F (°C)	10.7 (−11.8)	11.9 (−11.2)	19.9 (−6.7)	27.6 (−2.4)	37.0 (2.8)	45.9 (7.7)	53.1 (11.7)	50.8 (10.4)	41.7 (5.4)	29.6 (−1.3)	19.4 (−7.0)	11.0 (−11.7)	29.9 (−1.2)
Mean minimum °F (°C)	−10.7 (−23.7)	−6.8 (−21.6)	3.1 (−16.1)	15.8 (−9.0)	26.3 (−3.2)	36.8 (2.7)	45.6 (7.6)	42.6 (5.9)	29.9 (−1.2)	14.7 (−9.6)	1.8 (−16.8)	−7.8 (−22.1)	−17.5 (−27.5)
Record low °F (°C)	−40 (−40)	−37 (−38)	−27 (−33)	−15 (−26)	13 (−11)	27 (−3)	32 (0)	30 (−1)	9 (−13)	−8 (−22)	−26 (−32)	−38 (−39)	−40 (−40)
Average precipitation inches (mm)	0.44 (11)	0.53 (13)	0.72 (18)	1.49 (38)	2.80 (71)	2.16 (55)	1.39 (35)	0.75 (19)	1.28 (33)	1.25 (32)	0.51 (13)	0.43 (11)	13.75 (349)
Average snowfall inches (cm)	6.6 (17)	7.4 (19)	6.5 (17)	4.2 (11)	0.9 (2.3)	0.0 (0.0)	0.0 (0.0)	0.0 (0.0)	0.7 (1.8)	3.5 (8.9)	5.9 (15)	7.0 (18)	42.7 (110)
Average precipitation days (≥ 0.01 in)	5.4	6.7	6.4	8.4	11.7	10.0	7.6	5.9	6.0	7.1	4.7	4.8	84.7
Average snowy days (≥ 0.1 in)	4.7	6.0	3.9	2.3	0.4	0.0	0.0	0.0	0.2	1.8	3.4	4.6	27.3
Source 1: NOAA
Source 2: National Weather Service

== Government and infrastructure ==
The Wyoming Department of Health Veteran's Home of Wyoming, an assisted living facility for veterans and their dependents, is located in Buffalo. The facility was operated by the Wyoming Board of Charities and Reform until that agency was dissolved as a result of a state constitutional amendment passed in November 1990. Buffalo also has an airport named Johnson County Airport/KBYG.

== Education ==
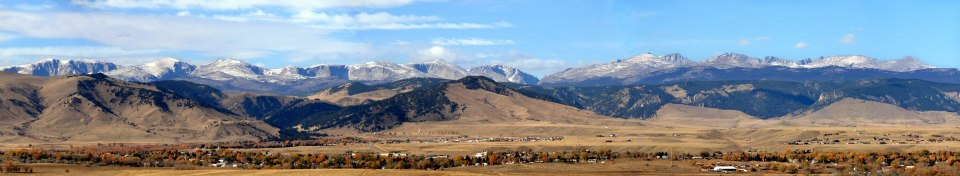
Buffalo at the base of the Bighorn Mountains

Public education in the city of Buffalo is provided by Johnson County School District #1. Schools serving the city include Meadowlark Elementary School (grades K–2) Cloud Peak Elementary School (grades 3–5), Clear Creek Middle School (grades 6–8), and Buffalo High School (grades 9–12). Buffalo High School was in the national news spotlight after the head football coach, distributed an offensive "hurt feelings report" in November 2011. This attention brought several heated school board meetings and eventually lead to the resignation of Lynch as the head football coach.

Buffalo has a public library, the Johnson County Library.

== Transportation ==
Buffalo is located near the northern terminus of Interstate 25, where it joins with Interstate 90.

The city is served by a general aviation airfield, the Johnson County Airport (Wyoming), which does not have scheduled passenger air service.

Airports in the region which do have airline service include:

- Sheridan (SHR) - Approx. 1/2-hour drive to Buffalo
- Gillette (GCC) - Approx. 1-hour drive to Buffalo
- Casper (CPR) - Approx. 1.5-hour drive to Buffalo
- Billings (BIL) - Approx. 2+hours drive to Buffalo

=== Public transport ===
Buffalo and its surroundings are served by the Buffalo Area Transit System which is a paratransit service operated by the Buffalo Senior Center Buffalo Area Transit System also offers trips to Sheridan and Casper.

Intercity bus service to the city is provided by Express Arrow and Jefferson Lines.

== Media ==
=== Radio ===
- KBBS AM 1450 "Classic Country"
- KBTG FM 88.3 "Buffalo's Traditional Gospel"
- KBUW FM 90.5 Wyoming Public Radio
- KLGT FM 96.5 "KIX 96.5"
- KZZS FM 98.3 "The Peak"

== Notable people ==
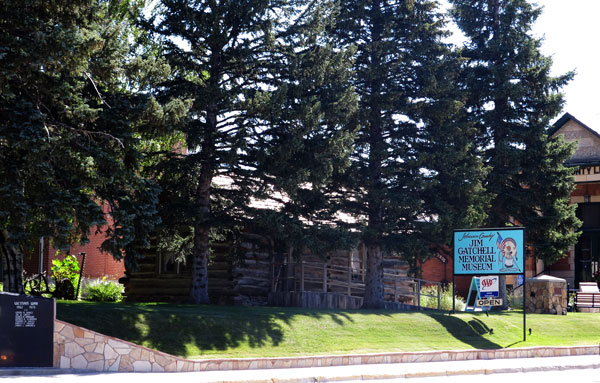
Jim Gatchell Memorial Museum in Buffalo

- Mark Gordon (born 1957), businessman, rancher from Buffalo and Wyoming governor
- Patrick "Patsy" Healy, Sr. (1847-1918), sheepman
- Verna Keays (1893–1982), designer of the Flag of Wyoming
- Frank E. Lucas (1876–1948), Governor of Wyoming
- Mathew Pitsch (born 1963), Republican member of the Arkansas House of Representatives for Fort Smith since 2015; Buffalo native
- Chris Prosinski (born 1987), safety for the Chicago Bears; previously played for the Jacksonville Jaguars and Philadelphia Eagles
- Constantine Scollen (1841–1902), missionary, resident priest from 1893 to 1894
- Joe Tiller (1942–2017), head football coach Wyoming (six years) and Purdue (nine years)

== See also ==
- Fort McKinney (Wyoming)
- List of municipalities in Wyoming
- Longmire (TV series)
- Endangered Species (1982 film)
