= KBTG =

KBTG may refer to:

- KBTG (FM), a radio station (88.3 FM) licensed to serve Buffalo, Wyoming, United States; see List of radio stations in Wyoming
- KBTG-LP, a defunct low-power radio station (99.5 FM) formerly licensed to serve Buffalo
