= Sheridan, Wyoming =

- City
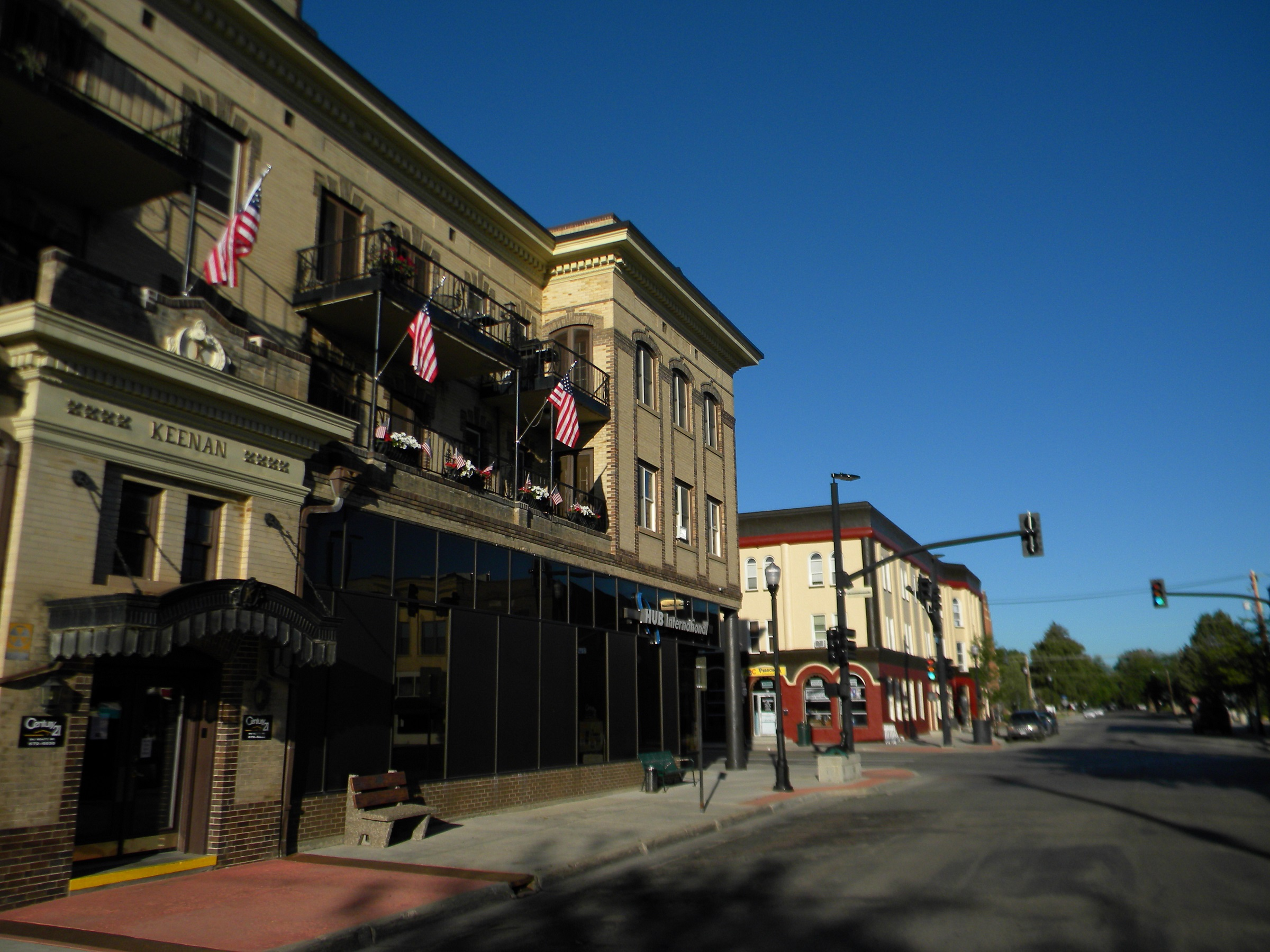
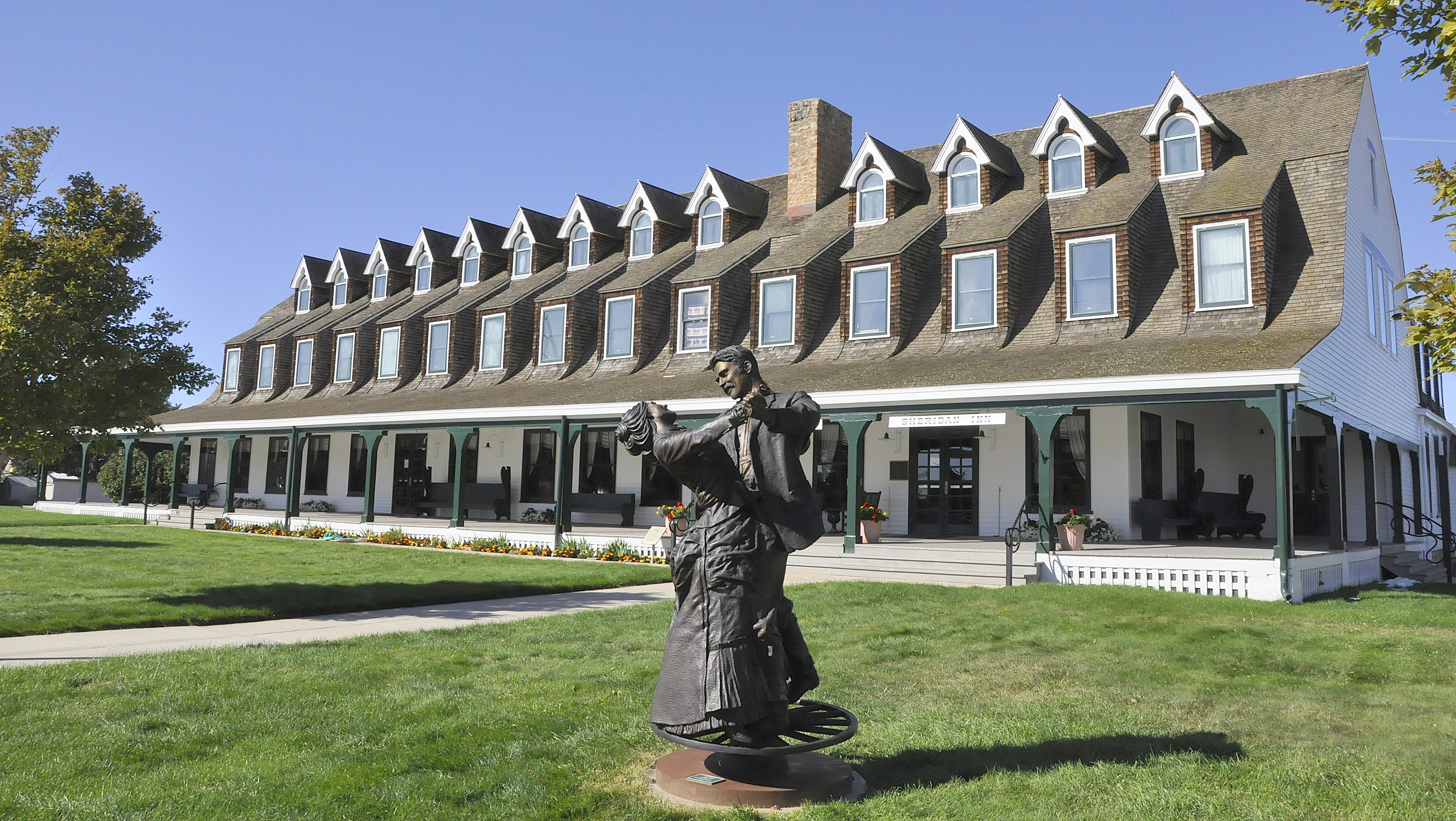
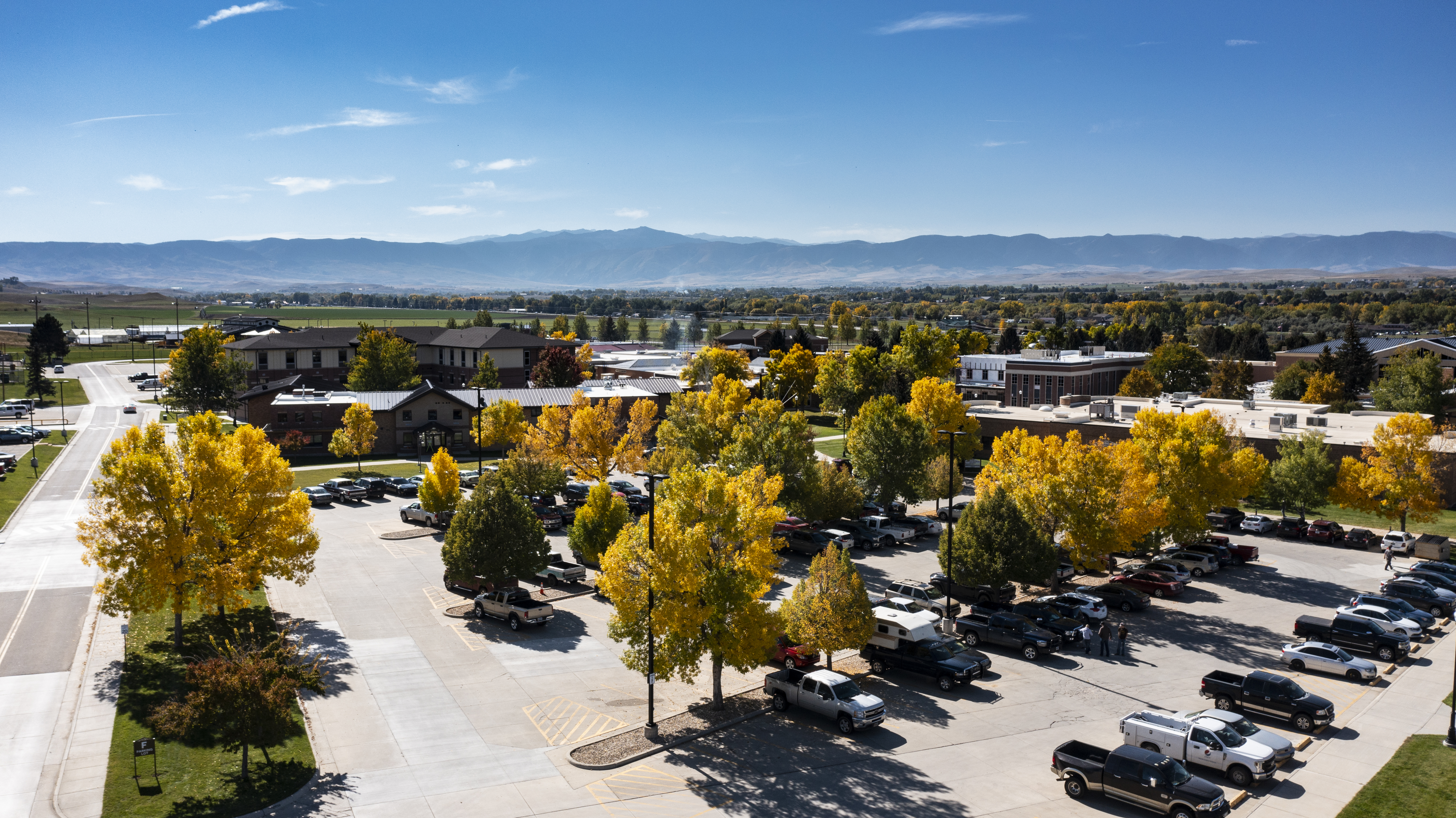
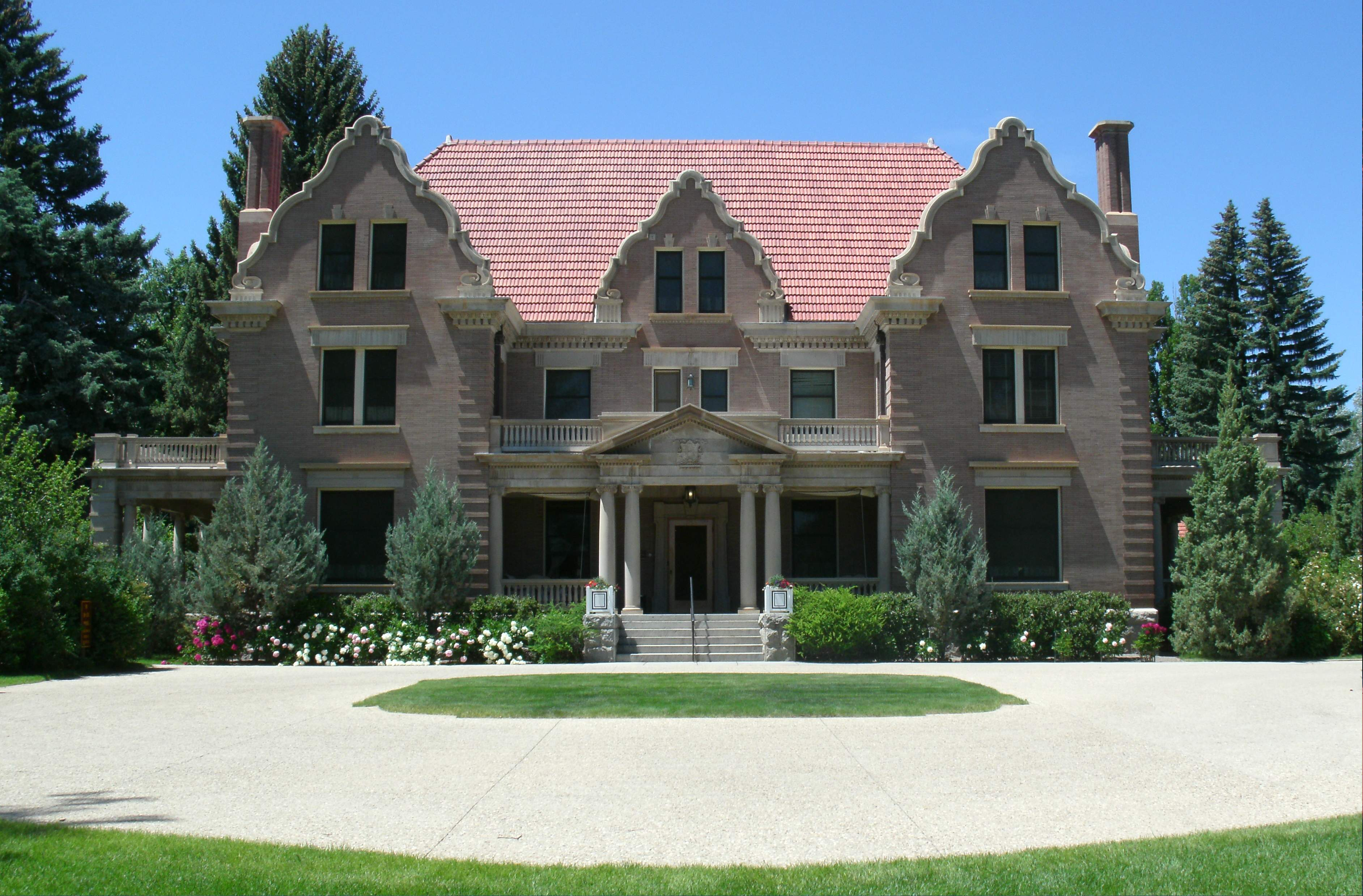
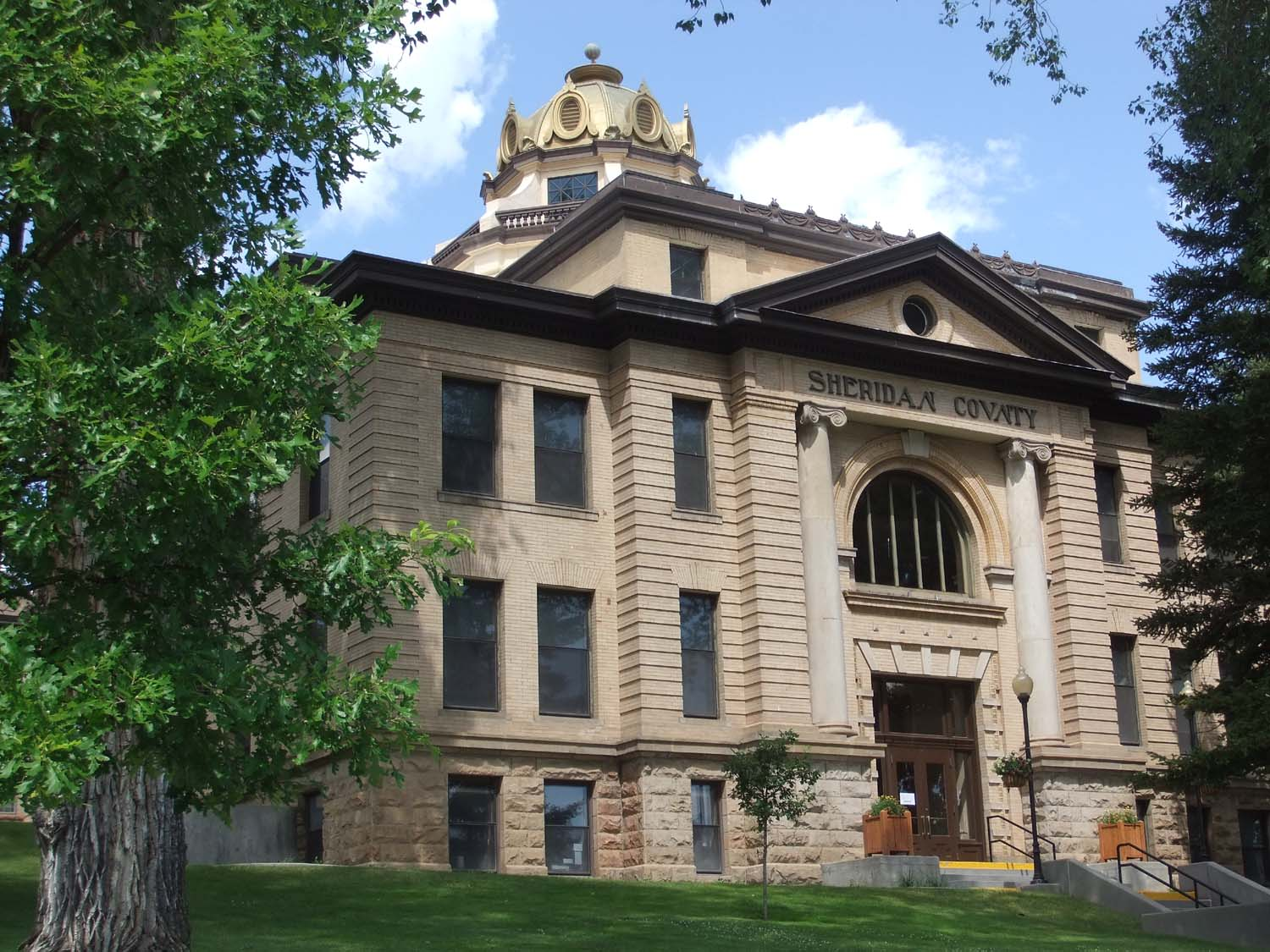
- Downtown Sheridan Sheridan Inn Sheridan College Trail End Sheridan County Courthouse

- Location of Sheridan in Sheridan County, Wyoming.

- Location of Sheridan, Wyoming Sheridan, Wyoming (the United States)
- Coordinates: 44°47′48″N 106°57′32″W
- Country: United States
- State: Wyoming
- County: Sheridan

Area
  - Total: 12.71 sq mi (32.91 km^{2})
  - Land: 12.68 sq mi (32.85 km^{2})
  - Water: 0.023 sq mi (0.06 km^{2})
- Elevation: 3,757 ft (1,145 m)

Population (2020)
  - Total: 18,737
  - Density: 1,414.4/sq mi (546.11/km^{2})
- Time zone: UTC−7 (Mountain (MST))
  - Summer (DST): UTC−6 (MDT)
- ZIP code: 82801
- Area code: 307
- FIPS code: 56-69845
- GNIS feature ID: 2411887
- Website: www.sheridanwy.gov

Sheridan is a city in the U.S. state of Wyoming and the county seat of Sheridan County. The city is located halfway between Yellowstone Park and Mount Rushmore by U.S. Route 14 and 16. It is the principal town of the Sheridan, Wyoming, Micropolitan Statistical Area which encompasses all of Sheridan County. The 2020 census put the city's population at 18,737, making it the sixth-most populous city in Wyoming.

== History ==
The city was named after General Philip Sheridan, Union cavalry leader in the American Civil War. Several battles between US Cavalry and the Sioux, Cheyenne, Arapaho, Shoshone, and Crow Indian tribes occurred in the area in the 1860s and 1870s before the town was built.

In 1878, trapper George Mandel built a cabin on Big Goose Creek, since reconstructed in the Whitney Commons park near the Sheridan County Fulmer Public Library. Jack Dow surveyed the townsite for Sheridan in 1882, at the behest of John Loucks, first mayor of the town who had served under Gen. Sheridan.

In the early 1880s, the nearby town of Big Horn was larger in population. In 1888, Sheridan County split off of Johnson County, and voters chose Sheridan as the county seat in a run-off election. The arrival of the Burlington and Missouri Railroad in 1892 boosted Sheridan's economic status, leading to the construction of the Sheridan Inn, where Buffalo Bill Cody was once a financial partner. Railroad maintenance facilities and railroad-tie treatment plants were significant employers in Sheridan's first decades. The railroad created numerous side industries as well as export opportunities for raw materials. Maps of the day show Sheridan as part of the "hinterland" providing raw goods to cities like Chicago. For the next twenty years the economy and population boomed.

Numerous coal mines funded by Chicago investors opened along Tongue River north of Sheridan in the 1890s, sparking immigration, and a major building boom that built Sheridan's brick downtown district. By 1910, an electric streetcar line, the only one in the state, connected the mining towns of Monarch, Dietz, and Acme to Sheridan.

Sheridan was settled by farmers from midwestern states like Illinois, and a few people who came up the cattle trails from Texas, like John B. Kendrick, who went on to be a cattle tycoon and Governor of Wyoming. Many immigrants from Poland, Italy, Greece, Germany, Mexico, and Japan settled in Sheridan, finding work in coal mines, railroad, or agriculture. One Muslim immigrant was Zarif Khan, a charismatic Afghani tamale and hamburger vendor from what became Pakistan whose neighborly generosity is still remembered in Sheridan. Many Polish families came from the Jaworzynka village in southern Poland. English immigrants who settled in the area were overwhelmingly farmers.

Agriculture played a major role in Sheridan County's early economy. By the 1920s, Sheridan was an agricultural processing center for wheat, dairy, and sugar beets, with a stockyard for cattle shipping by rail. Many hobos rode the rails to Sheridan in the 1920s and 1930s, seeking employment in agriculture and ranches. From 1935 through 1939, Sheridan was considered the state capital of the proposed state of Absaroka, a secessionist movement that proved unsuccessful.

The role of underground coal mining declined in the 1950s when demand for coal to power steam locomotives declined due to adoption of diesel locomotives. As coal mine towns dwindled, many employees moved into Sheridan and found other lines of work. The economy boomed in the 1970s with the construction of strip mines along Tongue River in Montana. Many subdivisions were built on former small farms outside of Sheridan in the 1970s and 1980s as the dairy, wheat, and sugar beet industry consolidated to other areas in Montana and South Dakota with more production capacity.

Tourism has long been a significant factor in Sheridan's economy and community life. Numerous guest ranches including Eaton's Ranch hosted guests that arrived by rail. Books like Diary of a Dude Wrangler and Hell Among the Yearlings document this history. Many dude ranch guests moved to Sheridan permanently, leaving a lasting influence on the area's economy, cultural life, and charity institutions. Sheridan has a number of local educational and community foundations, and almost 400 non-profits. Community-funded entities include a large Y.M.C.A. recreation center, and the WYO Theater.

In the 21st century, Sheridan is the economic center for a large area spanning three counties in north-central Wyoming and southern Montana. The town has a relatively diversified service economy—including government, healthcare, education, real estate, mining, and financial services, with a growing manufacturing sector—in contrast to many communities in Wyoming which rely mostly on natural resource extraction, government jobs, or national park tourism.

== Geography ==
According to the United States Census Bureau, the city has a total area of 10.95 square miles (28.36 km^{2}), of which 10.93 square miles (28.31 km^{2}) is land and 0.02 square miles (0.05 km^{2}) is water.

=== Climate ===
Sheridan experiences a semi-arid climate (Köppen BSk), with cold, dry winters and hot, wet summers, though summers in recent years have been trending more dry.

Climate data for Sheridan, Wyoming (Sheridan County Airport) (1991–2020 normals, extremes 1907–present)
Month	Jan	Feb	Mar	Apr	May	Jun	Jul	Aug	Sep	Oct	Nov	Dec	Year
Record high °F (°C)	71 (22)	76 (24)	83 (28)	87 (31)	95 (35)	107 (42)	109 (43)	106 (41)	104 (40)	93 (34)	81 (27)	77 (25)	109 (43)
Mean maximum °F (°C)	59.3 (15.2)	58.6 (14.8)	71.0 (21.7)	78.9 (26.1)	85.2 (29.6)	94.1 (34.5)	100.7 (38.2)	99.5 (37.5)	94.8 (34.9)	83.1 (28.4)	70.2 (21.2)	60.1 (15.6)	101.9 (38.8)
Mean daily maximum °F (°C)	36.3 (2.4)	38.4 (3.6)	49.0 (9.4)	56.7 (13.7)	66.1 (18.9)	76.9 (24.9)	87.8 (31.0)	86.6 (30.3)	75.6 (24.2)	59.9 (15.5)	46.7 (8.2)	36.7 (2.6)	59.7 (15.4)
Daily mean °F (°C)	24.0 (−4.4)	26.0 (−3.3)	35.7 (2.1)	43.2 (6.2)	52.4 (11.3)	61.8 (16.6)	70.7 (21.5)	69.1 (20.6)	59.1 (15.1)	45.4 (7.4)	33.3 (0.7)	24.5 (−4.2)	45.4 (7.5)
Mean daily minimum °F (°C)	11.7 (−11.3)	13.7 (−10.2)	22.4 (−5.3)	29.7 (−1.3)	38.7 (3.7)	46.8 (8.2)	53.5 (11.9)	51.5 (10.8)	42.5 (5.8)	31.0 (−0.6)	19.9 (−6.7)	12.2 (−11.0)	31.1 (−0.5)
Mean minimum °F (°C)	−12.9 (−24.9)	−8.8 (−22.7)	2.2 (−16.6)	14.8 (−9.6)	25.7 (−3.5)	35.3 (1.8)	44.4 (6.9)	40.7 (4.8)	29.5 (−1.4)	12.7 (−10.7)	−2.2 (−19.0)	−9.1 (−22.8)	−20.0 (−28.9)
Record low °F (°C)	−36 (−38)	−38 (−39)	−23 (−31)	−10 (−23)	13 (−11)	27 (−3)	35 (2)	26 (−3)	6 (−14)	−12 (−24)	−27 (−33)	−41 (−41)	−41 (−41)
Average precipitation inches (mm)	0.61 (15)	0.65 (17)	1.02 (26)	1.87 (47)	2.68 (68)	1.98 (50)	1.07 (27)	0.71 (18)	1.47 (37)	1.57 (40)	0.76 (19)	0.54 (14)	14.93 (378)
Average snowfall inches (cm)	13.0 (33)	12.3 (31)	11.0 (28)	8.5 (22)	1.0 (2.5)	0.0 (0.0)	0.0 (0.0)	0.0 (0.0)	0.8 (2.0)	6.7 (17)	8.1 (21)	10.0 (25)	71.4 (181)
Average precipitation days (≥ 0.01 in)	7.5	8.1	9.7	10.8	12.3	10.2	7.6	6.3	6.6	8.8	7.3	7.1	102.3
Average snowy days (≥ 0.1 in)	7.3	8.5	6.3	4.3	0.7	0.0	0.0	0.0	0.3	2.8	5.2	7.6	43.0
Average relative humidity (%)	66.1	66.3	62.7	58.4	60.3	59.7	50.2	47.1	54.4	57.7	65.6	66.7	59.6
Mean monthly sunshine hours	155.2	172.1	228.0	242.8	279.3	313.1	350.9	322.9	255.8	205.5	148.2	148.8	2,822.6
Percentage possible sunshine	54	59	62	60	61	67	75	74	68	60	51	54	63
Source 1: NOAA (relative humidity and sun 1961–1990)
Source 2: NOAA

== Demographics ==
Historical population
Census	Pop.	Note	%±
1890	281		—
1900	1,559		454.8%
1910	8,408		439.3%
1920	9,175		9.1%
1930	8,538		−6.9%
1940	10,529		23.3%
1950	11,500		9.2%
1960	11,651		1.3%
1970	10,856		−6.8%
1980	15,146		39.5%
1990	13,900		−8.2%
2000	15,804		13.7%
2010	17,444		10.4%
2020	18,737		7.4%

=== 2020 census ===
As of the 2020 census, Sheridan had a population of 18,737. The median age was 40.2 years. 21.3% of residents were under the age of 18 and 20.8% of residents were 65 years of age or older. For every 100 females there were 95.6 males, and for every 100 females age 18 and over there were 92.9 males age 18 and over.

97.3% of residents lived in urban areas, while 2.7% lived in rural areas.

There were 8,370 households in Sheridan, of which 25.2% had children under the age of 18 living in them. Of all households, 40.2% were married-couple households, 22.6% were households with a male householder and no spouse or partner present, and 30.2% were households with a female householder and no spouse or partner present. About 39.2% of all households were made up of individuals and 16.7% had someone living alone who was 65 years of age or older.

There were 9,006 housing units, of which 7.1% were vacant. The homeowner vacancy rate was 1.4% and the rental vacancy rate was 6.4%.

Racial composition as of the 2020 census
Race	Number	Percent
White	16,735	89.3%
Black or African American	78	0.4%
American Indian and Alaska Native	217	1.2%
Asian	131	0.7%
Native Hawaiian and Other Pacific Islander	14	0.1%
Some other race	356	1.9%
Two or more races	1,206	6.4%
Hispanic or Latino (of any race)	1,042	5.6%

=== 2010 census ===
As of the 2010 census, there were 17,444 people, 7,680 households, and 4,296 families residing in the city. The population density was 1,596.0 inhabitants per square mile (616.2/km^{2}). There were 8,253 housing units at an average density of 755.1 per square mile (291.5/km^{2}). The racial makeup of the city was 94.9% White, 0.4% African American, 1.0% Native American, 0.9% Asian, 0.1% Pacific Islander, 0.9% from other races, and 1.8% from two or more races. Hispanic or Latino of any race were 4.3% of the population.

There were 7,680 households, of which 26.9% had children under the age of 18 living with them, 42.0% were married couples living together, 9.6% had a female householder with no husband present, 4.3% had a male householder with no wife present, and 44.1% were non-families. 36.9% of all households were made up of individuals, and 13.7% had someone living alone who was 65 years of age or older. The average household size was 2.17 and the average family size was 2.86.

The median age in the city was 39.2 years. 22% of residents were under the age of 18; 9.7% were between the ages of 18 and 24; 25% were from 25 to 44; 27.5% were from 45 to 64; and 15.8% were 65 years of age or older. The gender makeup of the city was 49.6% male and 50.4% female.

=== 2000 census ===
As of the census of 2000, there were 15,804 people, 7,005 households, and 4,062 families residing in the city. The population density was 1,862.4 people per square mile (718.7/km^{2}). There were 7,413 housing units at an average density of 873.6 per square mile (337.1/km^{2}). The racial makeup of the city was 95.93% White, 0.22% African American, 0.97% Native American, 0.46% Asian, 0.20% Pacific Islander, 0.85% from other races, and 1.37% from two or more races. Hispanic or Latino of any race were 2.64% of the population. 24.0% were of German, 12.5% English, 10.3% Irish, 7.6% United States or American, 5.9% Norwegian and 5.3% Polish ancestry according to Census 2000.

There were 7,005 households, out of which 26.7% had children under the age of 18 living with them, 45.0% were married couples living together, 9.7% had a female householder with no husband present, and 42.0% were non-families. 35.8% of all households were made up of individuals, and 14.8% had someone living alone who was 65 years of age or older. The average household size was 2.21 and the average family size was 2.88.

In the city, the population was spread out, with 23.1% under the age of 18, 9.5% from 18 to 24, 26.3% from 25 to 44, 24.2% from 45 to 64, and 16.9% who were 65 years of age or older. The median age was 39 years. For every 100 females, there were 92.7 males. For every 100 females age 18 and over, there were 89.0 males.

The median income for a household in the city was $31,420, and the median income for a family was $40,106. Males had a median income of $30,829 versus $19,783 for females. The per capita income for the city was $18,500. About 8.6% of families and 11.2% of the population were below the poverty line, including 16.1% of those under age 18 and 6.5% of those age 65 or over.

== Economy ==
Like many towns in the western United States, Sheridan's early industries included cattle ranching, logging, coal mining, railroading, agriculture, and small factories including a flour mill, brewery, commercial registered agents, and a sugarbeet refinery.

It is a vacation destination and a travel stop, due to its proximity to Interstate 90 and U.S. Route 14.

== Arts and culture ==
Sheridan has a strong rodeo culture that draws from ranching history as well as a tradition of catering to the wild-west entertainment and shopping tastes of locals and tourists. The Sheridan WYO Rodeo was established in 1931 to provide entertainment and economic development following the success of the PK Ranch Rodeos in 1928 and 1929. It was a professional rodeo from the beginning but took a hiatus because of the Second World War in 1942 and 1943. It returned as a working cowboy rodeo in 1944 with a new name, the Bots Sots Stampede. In 1951 it resumed as the Sheridan-Wyo-Rodeo and became a professional rodeo again in 1966.

In 1953, the Miss Indian America Pageant and All-American Indian Days, "an interracial project in human relations," was founded to celebrate American Indian culture.

The mix of cowboy and American Indian pageantry is still a major flavor in Sheridan's annual summer celebrations, akin to rodeos in other reservation-border towns like Pendleton, Oregon. Sheridan's milieu of cowboy-Indian cross-pollination and community relations provided part of the inspiration for the Walt Longmire mystery novel and TV series created by local author Craig Johnson. The 1987 HBO television crime thriller Into the Homeland was filmed here.

The Sheridan WYO Rodeo, which began in 1931, is widely regarded as one of the top rodeos in the nation. It draws 25,000 guests to its annual, weeklong western celebration and performance each July at the Sheridan County Fairgrounds. The Sheridan WYO Rodeo recently launched a new Labor Day Weekend destination event called the Cowboy State Elite Rodeo, the only ERA League of Champions Rodeo event in an outdoor arena in the U.S.

An eight-foot-tall (2.5 m) replica of Leonardo's horse was dedicated on August 20, 2014. The Wyoming Horse was commissioned by the Wyoming Community Foundation on behalf of the Sheridan Public Arts Committee.

Ten sites in and near Sheridan are listed on the National Register of Historic Places, including:

- Trail End State Historic Site - 400 Clarendon Avenue - A mansion finished in 1913 that was the home of John Benjamin Kendrick (1857–1933). Kendrick was a cattle rancher who served as governor of Wyoming before being elected to three terms as a United States senator. Trail End is now a state-operated museum and is known locally as the Kendrick Mansion. Most of the contents of the museum are original to the Kendrick family. The mansion and carriage house were designed by Glenn Charles McAlister, a self-taught architect from Billings, Montana. In 1979 the mansion's carriage house was converted into a small theater for the performing arts, dubbed The Carriage House Theater.
- Quarter Circle A Ranch in Big Horn, Wyoming - just 12 miles south of Sheridan. This historic, 620-acre gentleman's working ranch is home to The Brinton Museum, one of the nation's top western and American Indian Museums.
- Sheridan County Courthouse (Wyoming) - 224 South Main Street.
- Fort Mackenzie - 1898 Fort Road - Currently a hospital administered by the Veterans Administration.
- Holy Name Catholic School – 260 East Loucks Street - Oldest Catholic school building remaining in the state of Wyoming.
- St. Peter's Episcopal Church - 1 South Tschirgi Street - Noted for its Gothic Revival architecture and stained glass windows.
- The historic Sheridan Inn (1893) - 856 Broadway Street - It has had a rich history of notable guests.
- Sheridan Main Street Historic District - Main Street from Burkitt to Mandel streets.
- Sheridan Railroad Historic District - 201-841 Broadway, 508-955 N. Gould
- Sheridan Flouring Mills, Inc. - 2161 Coffeen Avenue. The prominent smokestack is a United States Geological Survey map reference station.

Museums in Sheridan include the Sheridan County Museum and King's Saddlery Museum. The latter's exhibits display Western leather work (especially saddles) and cover Western history. The Brinton Museum in Big Horn, Wyoming, exhibits iconic 19th, 20th and 21st century Western and American Indian art in the 25,000 square-foot Forrest E. Mars, Jr. building and in its historic ranch house on the 620-acre Quarter Circle A Ranch. The museum was established in 1961 by Bradford Brinton's sister Helen Brinton, who wanted to make his historic collection of art available to the public. Exhibits include pieces by Charles M. Russell, Frederic Remington, Edward Borein, Winold Reiss, Thomas Moran, and Hans Kleiber, among many others.

Sheridan has a public library, a branch of the Sheridan County Public Library System.

== Parks and recreation ==
The City of Sheridan maintains nine parks. Kendrick Park, at the corner of Badger and Beaver Streets, includes a children's play area, a seasonal ice cream shop, a swimming pool, chainsaw carvings, and a buffalo and elk conservatory.

== Government ==
Sheridan is governed via the mayor-council system. The city council consists of six members elected which are elected at large in staggered terms. The mayor is elected in a citywide vote. The city has its own police department.

The Wyoming Department of Family Services Juvenile Services Division operates the Wyoming Girls' School, located in unincorporated Sheridan County, near Sheridan. The facility was operated by the Wyoming Board of Charities and Reform until that agency was dissolved as a result of a state constitutional amendment passed in November 1990.

== Education ==
Public education in the city of Sheridan is provided by Sheridan County School District #2. There are six elementary, two junior (or middle) schools -- Sheridan Junior High and The Wright Place -- and two high schools: Sheridan High School and Ft. Mackenzie High School. The Wright Place and Ft. Mackenzie High School are considered alternative education programs. In addition the district supports home schooling. Private and parochial schools are operated by Normative Services, Holy Name Parish (Holy Name School), and several religion-based organizations. The Northern Wyoming Community College District offers post-secondary education with Sheridan College.

== Media ==
=== Radio ===
- KROE AM 930
- KWYO AM 1410
- KHRW FM 92.7
- KYTI FM 93.7
- KZWY FM 94.9
- KLGT FM 96.5
- KZZS FM 98.3
- KOWY FM 102.3
- KLQQ FM 104.9

Two stations are public radio stations; KSUW FM 91.3, is a Wyoming Public Radio station and KPRQ FM 88.1, via translator from Montana State University - Billings in Billings, Montana.

=== Television ===
Five television stations are available in Sheridan:

- KTVQ (CBS) (Billings)
- KSWY (NBC) (Casper)
- KSGW-TV (ABC) (simulcasts KOTA-TV in Rapid City)
- translator for PBS affiliate KCWC-DT in Lander
- translator for KTWO (ABC) from Casper

=== Newspapers ===
The Sheridan Press is the local newspaper. The Billings Gazette and Casper Star Tribune are regional newspapers available in Sheridan.

=== Film location ===
Several scenes of the 2006 film Flicka were filmed on location in Sheridan. It was based on the novel, My Friend Flicka.

Movies filmed in Sheridan include Into the Homeland, Wild Horses and Endangered Species.

== Infrastructure ==
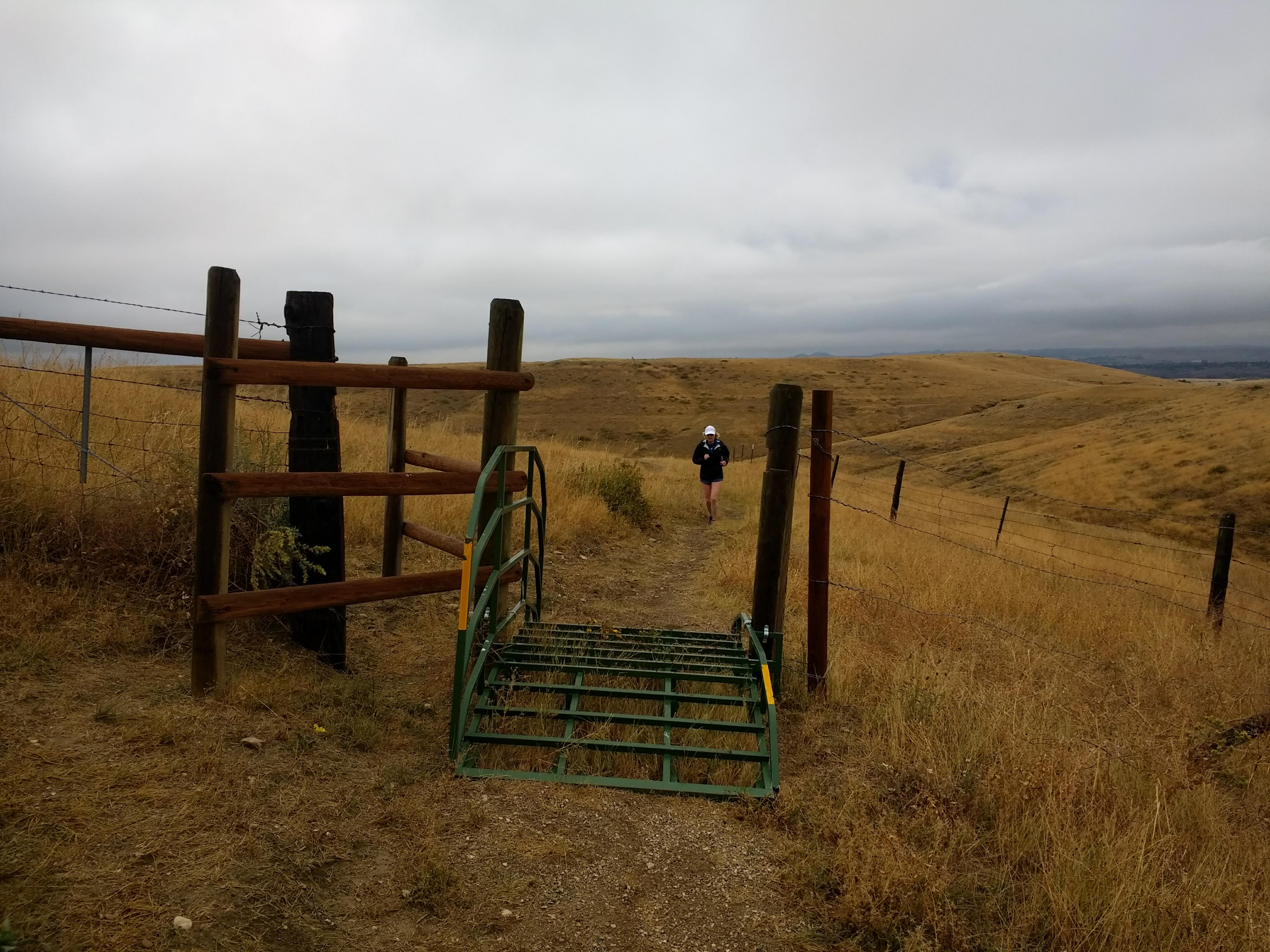
A public use trail for runners, mountain bikers and hikers in Sheridan.

=== Transportation ===
Intercity bus service is available in Sheridan through Jefferson Lines. Local service is provided by the Goose Creek Transit and the Sheridan Trolley runs from Memorial Day through Labor Day.

Sheridan is served by Sheridan County Airport, located southwest of town. Bighorn Airways offers airplane and helicopter air charter service, as well as an aircraft repair and installation center. United Express, operated by SkyWest Airlines, offers scheduled nonstop flights to Denver, Colorado.

== Notable people ==
- James B. Aleshire, U.S. Army major general
- Brad Anderson, former CEO of Best Buy
- Jerry Andrus (1918–2007), magician, optical illusionist
- Jim Benepe, professional golfer, won 1988 Beatrice Western Open
- Dan M. "Buck" Brannaman, horse whisperer and star of Buck
- Buffalo Bill Cody, auditioned talent for his Wild West Show off the front porch of the Sheridan Inn
- William Henry Harrison III, U.S. Representative from Wyoming
- John B. Kendrick, Governor of Wyoming (1915–1917) and U.S. Senator (1917–1933)
- Zarif Khan, restaurant owner and investor who lived in Sheridan
- T. Allen Lawson, American artist
- Forrest Edward Mars Jr, Candy Heir (Mars, Incorporated)
- Clint Oldenburg, born in Sheridan and played football for the Washington Redskins
- Frances O’Connor, lived her childhood and young adult life in Sheridan and surrounding area.
- Louis J. O'Marr, 13th Attorney General of Wyoming
- Glenn Parker, Justice of the Wyoming Supreme Court
- Romaine Patterson, Sirius Satellite Radio talk show host, activist
- John Pilch, former NBA player
- John Howard Pyle, governor of Arizona, 1951–1955
- Frank J. Rodriguez Sr., Minnesota state representative
- John Rotellini, magician, mentalist, entertainer, speaker, host, and media personality.
- Constantine Scollen, missionary, pastor of the Catholic Church during 1893–1894
- Pete Simpson, state representative from Sheridan County from 1981 to 1984
- Oliver Wallop, 8th Earl of Portsmouth, Wyoming state legislator, rancher, and British noble
- Cris Williamson, singer and songwriter

== Representation in media ==
In 1984, Queen Elizabeth II visited Sheridan and stayed at Canyon Ranch as a guest of Wyoming U.S. Senator Malcolm Wallop, the brother of lifetime friend Lady Porchester, Jean Wallop, whose husband, George Herbert, 8th Earl of Carnarvon, was the queen's godson. It remained rather unpublicized before local reports of the Queen shopping at local stores caused international media outlets to hound the area, seeking to capture the obscure idea of British monarchy gathering at a ranch in the "Old West" nestled beneath the Rocky Mountains. Coverage drastically intensified the following day with the Brighton hotel bombing, a nearly successful assassination attempt on Prime Minister Margaret Thatcher, and reports of the Queen's impromptu call with President Ronald Reagan to discuss the matter.
