= Sheridan Main Street Historic District =

Historic district in Wyoming, United States

- U.S. National Register of Historic Places
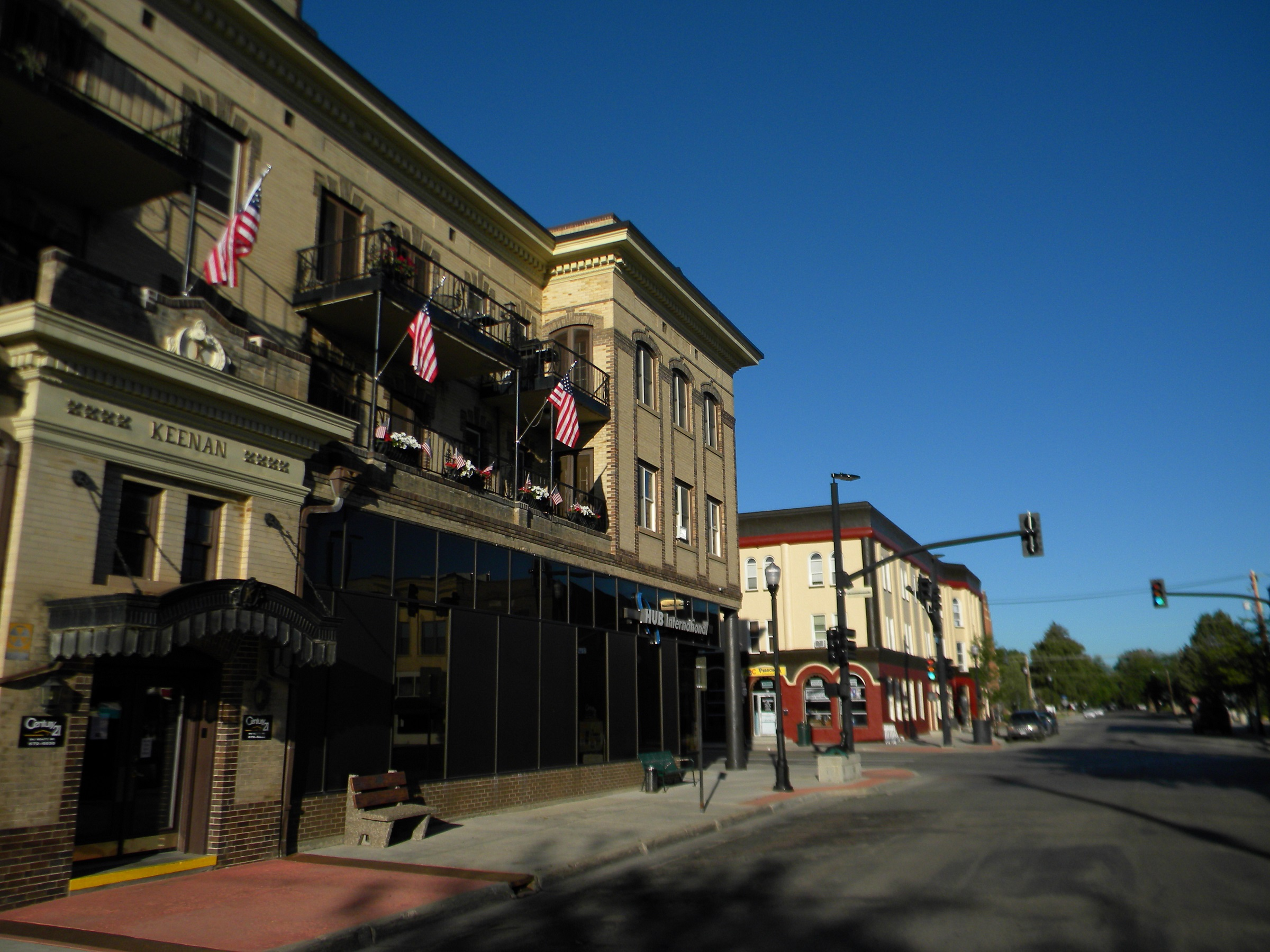

- Location within Wyoming Location within the United States
- Location: Main St. from Burkitt to Mandel Sts., Sheridan, Wyoming
- Coordinates: 44°47′55″N 106°57′19″W
- Area: 16.4 acres (6.6 ha)
- Built: 1882
- Architectural style: Late 19th and Early 20th Century American Movements
- NRHP reference No.: 82001837
- Added to NRHP: November 9, 1982

The Sheridan Main Street Historic District, in Sheridan, Wyoming, is a 16.4 acres (6.6 ha) historic district which was listed on the National Register of Historic Places in 1982.

It includes both sides of several blocks of Main Street, from Burkitt Street to Mandel Street, an area including the oldest portion of the historic core of Sheridan, dating back to 1882. It included 57 contributing buildings.
