= Sheridan County Courthouse (Wyoming) =

- U.S. National Register of Historic Places
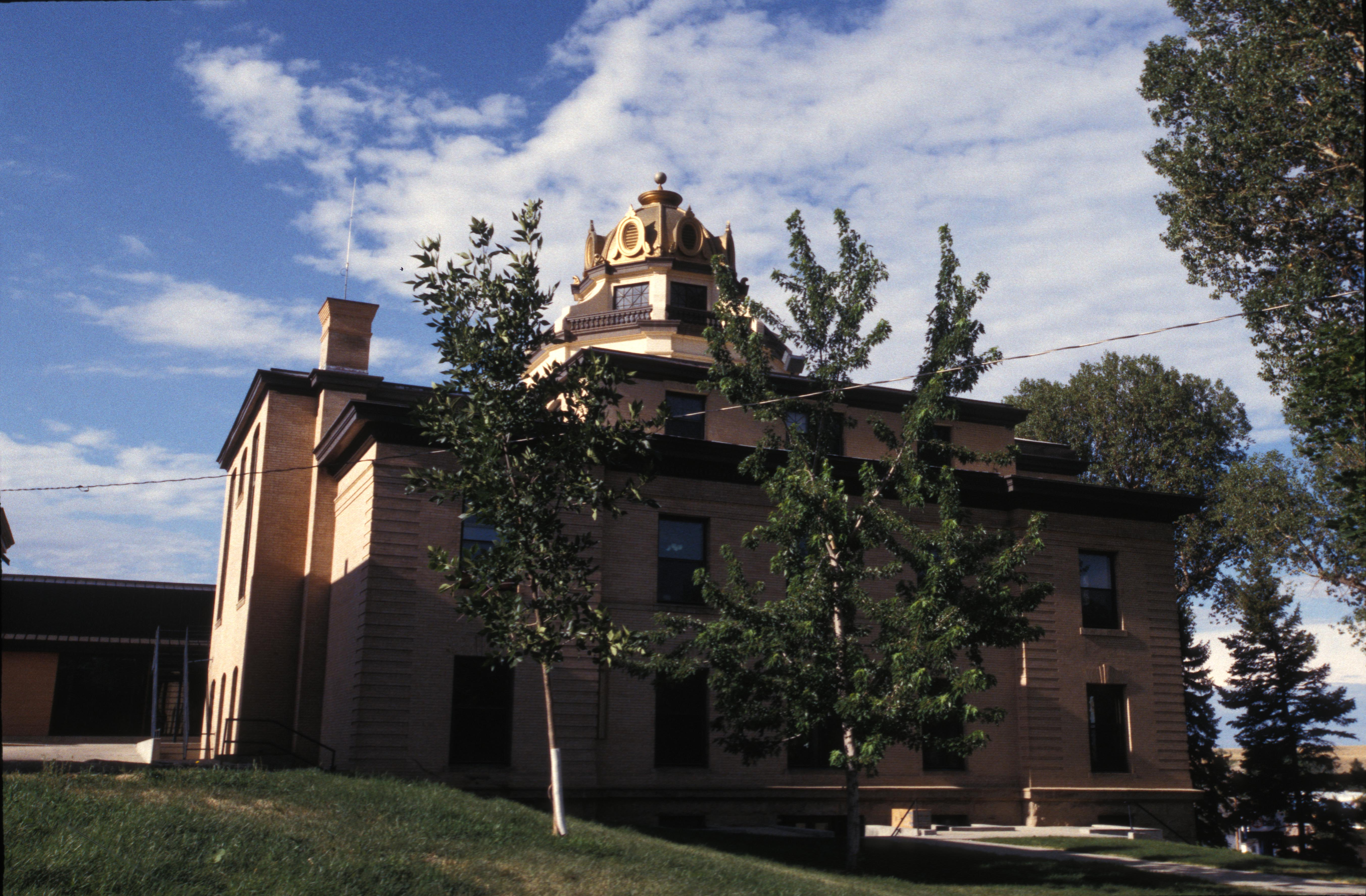

- Location within Wyoming Location within the United States
- Location: Burkett and Main Streets, Sheridan, Wyoming
- Coordinates: 44°47′42″N 106°57′21″W
- Area: 2 acres (0.81 ha)
- Built: 1904–05
- Architect: Link & McAllister
- Architectural style: Classical Revival, Beaux-Arts
- NRHP reference No.: 82001836
- Added to NRHP: November 15, 1982

The Sheridan County Courthouse, located at the intersection of Burkett and Main Streets in Sheridan, is the seat of government of Sheridan County, Wyoming. Built from 1904 to 1905, the courthouse was the first built in the county. The firm of Link & McAllister designed the courthouse; their design features elements of the Classical Revival and Beaux-Arts styles. The courthouse is topped by an octagonal dome with oval and rectangular windows and a balustrade. The building's entrance features a pediment and frieze supported by two Ionic columns. In 1913, a jail with a sheriff's residence was added to the courthouse site; this building has a similar design to the courthouse.

The courthouse was added to the National Register of Historic Places on November 15, 1982.
