= John Rotellini =

American magician and mentalist

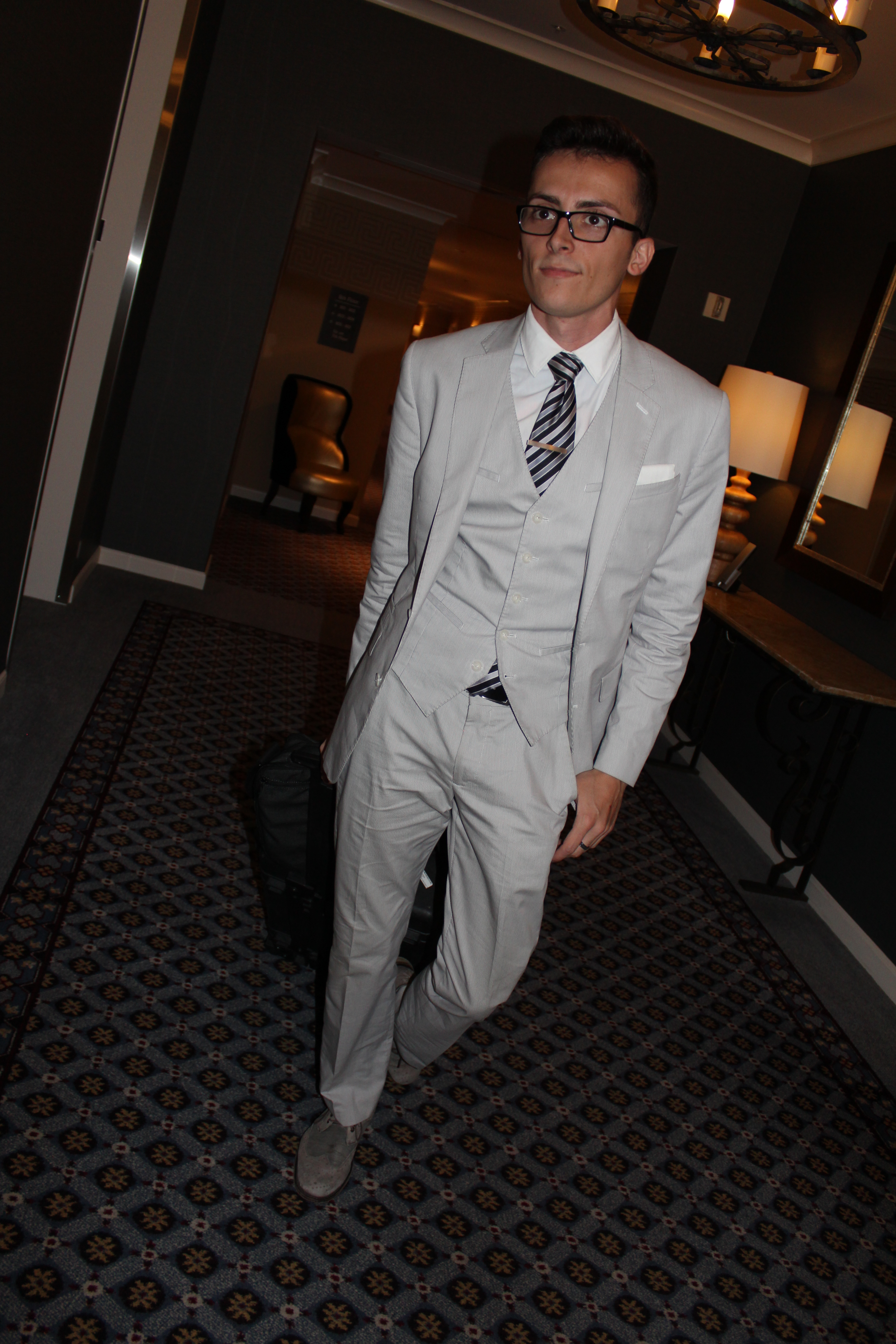
- Rotellini in 2015
- Born: John Frank Rotellini Jr. September 8, 1988 (age 37); Sheridan, Wyoming, U.S.
- Education: Sheridan College; University of Wyoming
- Occupations: Magician; mentalist; entertainer; speaker; host; media personality
- Years active: 2009–present
- Website: johnrotellini.com

John Frank Rotellini Jr. (born September 8, 1988), known professionally as John Rotellini, is an American magician, mentalist, entertainer, speaker, host, and media personality. Originally from Sheridan, Wyoming, he is based in Las Vegas, where he has performed in touring, college, corporate, cruise line, sports entertainment, virtual performance, and theatrical settings. Since December 2024, Rotellini has headlined select dates as The Mentalist at the V Theater in Las Vegas.

== Early life and education ==
Rotellini was born and raised in Sheridan, Wyoming. He began practicing magic in elementary school and later continued developing his performances while living in Wyoming. He attended community college in Sheridan before going to the University of Wyoming.

Rotellini attended Sheridan College, where he served on the Sheridan College Activities Board and gained experience in campus entertainment programming. He later transferred to the University of Wyoming, where he earned a bachelor's degree while performing on college campuses. He studied psychology at the University of Wyoming. While at the university, he was profiled by the student newspaper Branding Iron.

== Career ==
=== Early performances and touring ===
Rotellini began producing public stage shows in 2009 with Locked UP, a production that included large-scale illusions, audience participation, and a publicity stunt titled B L I N D. For the stunt, he spent part of a day without sight and drove a Pontiac Solstice roadster through Sheridan while blindfolded. The stunt promoted his early theater performances at the WYO Theater and raised several thousand dollars for Kidd's Kids, a children's charity.

In 2012, Locked UP transitioned into TOURPOCALYPSE, a touring show that was later recorded for broadcast and a DVD titled John Rotellini: TOURPOCALYPSE Live From The Gryphon Theatre. His later stage productions have included AGENT PROVOCATOUR, Up Close, and In Plain Sight.

Rotellini's live events have combined sleight of hand, illusion, psychology, con artistry, film, music, and theatre, with performances emphasizing audience interaction.

=== Las Vegas performances ===
Rotellini has been based in Las Vegas for much of his professional career. He has worked as a headlining entertainer, magician, mentalist, speaker, event host, and media personality.

In December 2024, Rotellini began headlining select dates as The Mentalist at the V Theater inside the Miracle Mile Shops in Las Vegas. The Mentalist is the longest-running mentalism production in Las Vegas and is also associated with creator and longtime headliner Gerry McCambridge. Bandsintown and Rotellini's official site list The Mentalist - V Theater @ Miracle Mile Las Vegas among his public performance dates.

=== Cruise line and international work ===
Rotellini's tours have taken him throughout the United States and abroad. His work has included cruise lines, casinos, theaters, performing arts centers, professional athletic organizations, academic institutions, and corporate events.

Rotellini has also been represented in the college entertainment market by NEON Entertainment. His career has included campuses, corporate brands, cruise lines, professional sports teams, casinos, resorts, and public touring. In the years leading up to his select-date headlining work in The Mentalist, his performance schedule included about 150 events and appearances in 20 countries per year.

=== College, corporate, and sports entertainment ===
Rotellini's background in college programming influenced his early work in the college entertainment market. He began performing on college campuses after his time as a campus activities programmer and continued that work while studying at the University of Wyoming. After graduation, he continued working in the college entertainment market while also working in corporate roles related to touring logistics, marketing, operations, and event management. In 2016, he left those executive roles to become a full-time entertainer and later expanded into corporate, cruise line, sports, casino, resort, and public touring settings.

Rotellini has appeared with the Harlem Globetrotters, becoming the first magician and mentalist to perform at T-Mobile Arena in Las Vegas during their performance in 2016. His official Bandsintown profile identifies the appearance as part of the Harlem Globetrotters' 90th Anniversary World Tour at T-Mobile Arena. The Harlem Globetrotters also released official YouTube footage titled Magic with John Rotellini.

Rotellini has delivered presentations connected to business and entrepreneurship programs. In 2018, he was a featured luncheon speaker for the GRO-Biz Conference and was identified as a University of Wyoming alumnus, small business owner, and Las Vegas magician.

On January 22, 2026, Rotellini was a member of a 12-person team that set a Guinness World Record for the fastest time to fold 12 T-shirts in relay during a work conference in Lake Las Vegas, Nevada. The team completed the relay in 2 minutes 19.65 seconds.

=== Virtual performances, hosting, and speaking ===
During the COVID-19 pandemic, Rotellini developed virtual performance offerings, including On Live with John Rotellini and related online programming. His virtual-event work has included livestreamed programming for audiences and event types such as galas, fundraisers, conferences, nonprofit events, community events, entertainment events, academic presentations, and keynote or speaking engagements. His virtual and broadcast work has included appearances connected to children's hospital programming and Seacrest Studios broadcasts.

Rotellini has also appeared in television and digital media segments, including a Valley View Live appearance and video programming connected to the TCS New York City Marathon.

=== Brand partnerships and production support ===
ProSoundWeb profiled Rotellini's use of a Countryman B6 lavalier microphone for interactive live events, noting that the microphone allowed him to move throughout performance spaces while maintaining audio pickup for both his own dialogue and audience interaction. His public biography has also listed brand relationships connected to his tours, including Countryman Microphones, Honey Stinger, American Crew Men's Products, and Express Fashion.

== Media and writing ==
Rotellini has contributed guest columns to the Casper Star-Tribune as part of the newspaper's Young Writers from Wyoming series. His columns included "Everything's Not OK and That's Alright," about mental health and seeking help, and "Seeing is... believing?", about perspective and critical thinking.

He has also hosted the podcast In Bed with John Rotellini.

== Philanthropy and community involvement ==
Rotellini has been involved in charitable and community work related to children's health, animal welfare, youth programs, veterans' services, and local community organizations. His charitable work has supported organizations including The Leukemia & Lymphoma Society, the USO, Make-A-Wish, Children's Miracle Network Hospitals, and Win Win Charity, formerly Win-Win Entertainment. He has also been connected to St. Jude's Ranch for Children and the Nevada SPCA.

Rotellini became one of Win Win Charity's most engaged performers in children's hospital outreach, completed more than 200 outreach events with the nonprofit, and was named the organization's Entertainer of the Year in 2022. The organization later renamed the award the John Rotellini Entertainer of the Year Award.

Rotellini is listed by the Nevada SPCA as one of its celebrity ambassadors. He serves on the boards of the Circle Nine Cattle Scholarship Fund and Change We Create.
