= KZWY =

- Sheridan, Wyoming; United States
- Frequency: 94.9 MHz (HD Radio)
- Branding: Z94 FM

Programming
- Format: Classic rock
- Subchannels: HD2: Classic hits; HD3: Active rock; HD4: Sports radio

Ownership
- Owner: Lovcom, Inc.; (Sheridan Media)
- Sister stations: KROE, KWYO, KYTI, KLQQ

History
- First air date: 1977
- Former call signs: KROE-FM (1977–1997)
- Call sign meaning: "Wyoming"

Technical information
- Licensing authority: FCC
- Facility ID: 38627
- Class: C
- ERP: 75,000 watts
- HAAT: 368 meters (1,207 ft)
- Transmitter coordinates: 44°37′20″N 107°6′57″W
- Translator: See § Translators

Links
- Public license information: Public file; LMS
- Webcast: Listen Live; Listen Live (HD2); Listen Live (HD3); Listen Live (HD4)
- Website: sheridanmedia.com

KZWY (94.9 FM) is a radio station broadcasting a classic rock format. Licensed to Sheridan, Wyoming, United States, the station is currently owned by Lovcom, Inc.

All Lovcom stations are located in the Sheridan Media Radio Center, at 1716 KROE Lane on Sheridan's east side.

== History ==
The station went on the air as KROE-FM on December 5, 1977, becoming Sheridan, Wyoming's first FM radio station. KROE-FM's 20,000 Watt transmitter was located in the new KROE building and the signal was broadcast to the Sheridan area from an antenna mounted on the KROE tower.

Through most of the 1980s and the early to mid 1990s, KROE-FM aired various satellite-delivered Adult Contemporary music formats. Responding to local demand, the format was shifted to a more rock-oriented lineup toward the later part of that decade. On June 30, 1997, the station changed its call sign to KZWY. Along with the call letter change, the music format was solidified with a locally programmed rock format and a new slogan: "Rock and Roll from Yesterday and Today." Also in the late 1990s, the station was moved to a new transmitter site at the top of the Big Horn Mountains and the power was increased to 75,000 Watts. This allowed the station to cover a large portion of Northeast Wyoming, including most of Sheridan, Johnson and Campbell counties.

In 2003, the slogan was modified to "Wyoming's Best Rock," while the format continued to be a mix of classic and new rock. Most of the programming on KZWY remained locally generated, but some nationally syndicated weekend shows were added including The Beatle Years, Flashback, The House of Hair, The Tour Bus and Harddrive. In 2012, Lovcom, Inc. signed on KOWY at 102.3 FM, and the Adult contemporary format which had been airing on KLQQ-HD2 (and translated on K240DW at 95.9 FM) was moved to this new station. "Magic 95.9" became "Magic 102.3." Meanwhile, the hybrid rock library on KZWY was split into two distinct formats. At the end of May 2012, KZWY began airing a straight classic rock format with an accompanying slogan change to "Wyoming's Classic Rock," while the new rock was moved to the newly available KLQQ-HD2 (and corresponding translator), which was relaunched as an Active Rock station branded "95.9 The Edge."

KZWY began broadcasting in HD Radio in the fall of 2005. Initially, a heavier rock format called "Nitro" was aired on the HD-2 channel and ESPN Radio on HD-3. Various HD multicast format changes occurred over the next few years, eventually settling on a Waitt Radio Networks Oldies format on HD-2 and eliminating the HD-3 channel. The Oldies channel is called "Oldies 105.9" because it is rebroadcast on two analog translators (K290BL and K290BM), both at 105.9 FM. In 2013, failures in the HD equipment on KLQQ forced a move of the Active Rock format from KLQQ-HD2 to KZWY-HD3. This channel is rebroadcast on translator K240DW as "95.9 The Edge." As of 2014, KZWY is the only station in the Lovcom group broadcasting in HD Radio.

In February 2017, KZWY added an HD-4 channel carrying a non-political talk format - also rebroadcast on a translator (K292DZ) - branded as "Smart Talk 106.3"

== Translators ==
Broadcast translators for KZWY
Call sign	Frequency	City of license	FID	ERP (W)	HAAT	Class	FCC info	Notes
K240DW	95.9 FM	Sheridan, Wyoming	142531	250	354.3 m (1,162 ft)	D	LMS	Relays HD3
K290BL	105.9 FM	Sheridan, Wyoming	71154	250	353.4 m (1,159 ft)	D	LMS	Relays HD2
K290BM	105.9 FM	Buffalo, Wyoming	142525	250	−90.4 m (−297 ft)	D	LMS	Relays HD2
K292DZ	106.3 FM	Sheridan, Wyoming	29893	135	−55 m (−180 ft)	D	LMS	Relays HD4

K240DW rebroadcasts KZWY's HD-3 programming, branded as "95.9 The Edge". K290BL and K290BM both rebroadcast KZWY's HD-2 programming, which is branded as "Classic Hits 105.9" to reflect the dial position of the translators on which it appears. K292DZ rebroadcasts KZWY's HD-4 programming, which is branded as "Fox Sports 106.3".
