= KBBS =

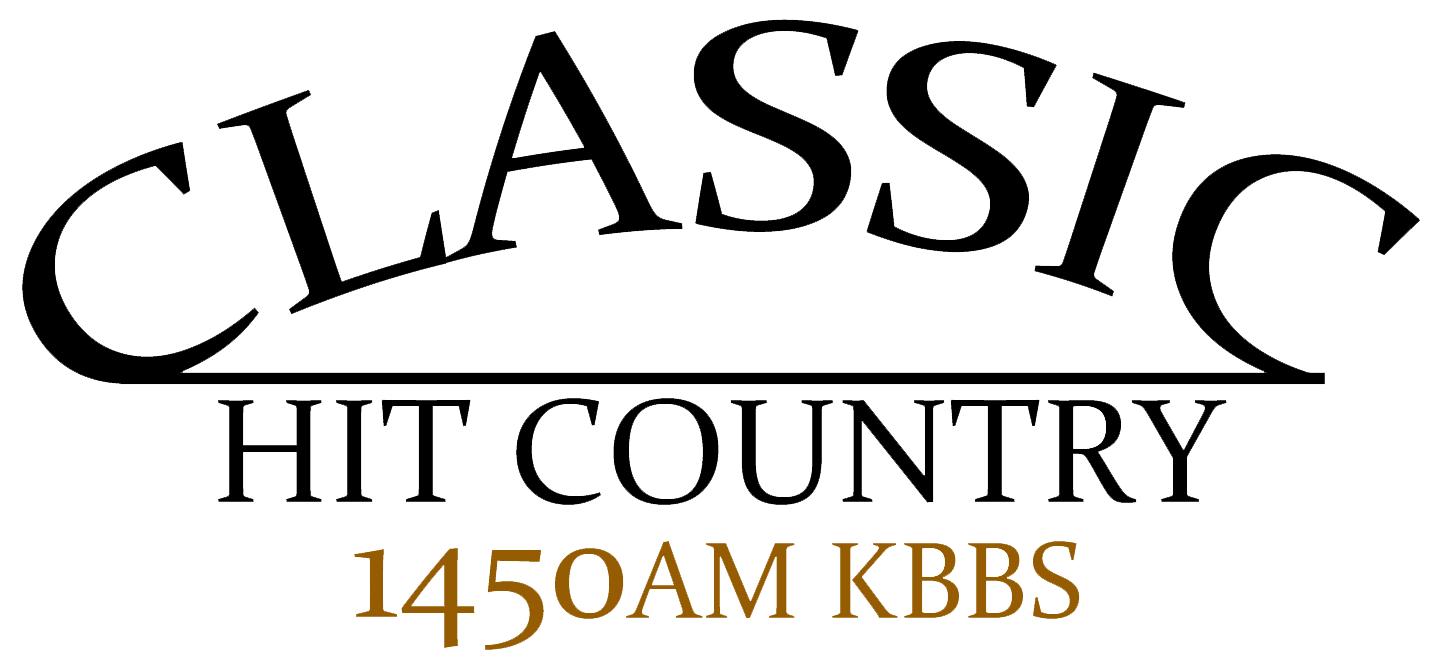
- Buffalo, Wyoming; United States
- Broadcast area: North Central Wyoming
- Frequency: 1450 kHz

Programming
- Format: Classic Country
- Affiliations: Cumulus Media

Ownership
- Owner: Legend Communications of Wyoming, Inc.; (Big Horn Mountain Radio Network)
- Sister stations: KLGT, KZZS, KHRW

History
- First air date: October 1, 1956
- Call sign meaning: Buffalo's Basque Station

Technical information
- Licensing authority: FCC
- Facility ID: 32988
- Class: C
- Power: 1,000 watts
- Transmitter coordinates: 44°20′33″N 106°40′54″W
- Translator: 103.5 K278CJ (Buffalo)

Links
- Public license information: Public file; LMS
- Webcast: Listen live (sports broadcasts only)
- Website: bighornmountainradio.com

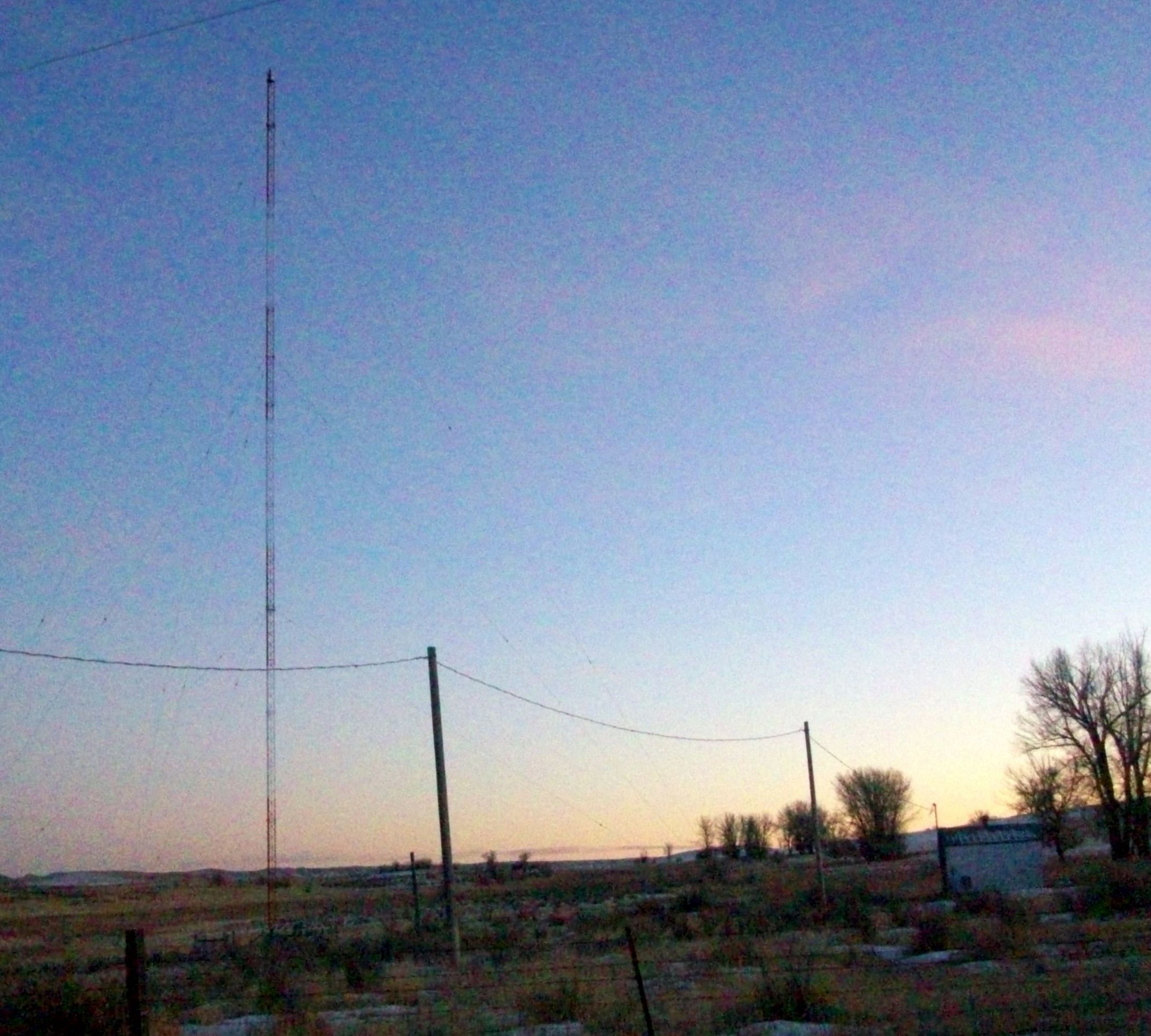
The tower for KBBS, east of Buffalo on Stockyard Road

KBBS (1450 AM) is a commercial radio station licensed to Buffalo, Wyoming. The station carries a classic country format, primarily originating from Cumulus Media. The station is currently owned by Big Horn Mountain Radio Network, a division of Legend Communications of Wyoming, LLC.

The station's 1,000 watt signal covers most of north central Wyoming, and can be received in Gillette when conditions are favorable.

KBBS also broadcasts local high school sports and University of Wyoming athletics programming. KBBS is located in the same facility as KLGT, and KZZS, at 1221 Fort Street, in Buffalo. The KBBS transmitter site is just south of Buffalo, on Stockyard Road.

In 2016, the station added an FM translator on 103.5, covering Buffalo and the immediate surrounding area.

== History ==
KBBS signed on the air on October 1, 1956. The station was owned by Northern Wyoming Broadcasting Corporation. It was limited to 250 watts, the standard for local channels at the time. In 1964, the station was transferred to KBBS Inc. The station gets its call letters from the Basque population in Buffalo. The station aired Basque music in the past.

In September 1976, KBBS increased its daytime power to 1,000 watts. Nighttime power remained 250 watts. KBBS was an affiliate of the American Information Radio Network.

The station is owned by Legend Communications of Wyoming, one of the largest radio groups in the state. Legend operates stations in Gillette, Cody, and Worland as well. The group's owner is Larry Patrick. In February 2024, Susan Patrick, Larry's then-wife, was sentenced to 15 months in prison for willfully making and subscribing a false tax return by a Maryland federal judge. She was also ordered to pay approximately $3.84 million in restitution to the United States. This situation necessitated an urgent filing with the FCC to transfer her entire 50% stake in Legend Communications to her now ex-husband, Larry Patrick, for a token price of $1.00. This makes Larry Patrick the 100% equity holder, pending FCC approval.

As of November, 2025, the station was silent.
