= KHRW =

- Ranchester, Wyoming; United States
- Broadcast area: Sheridan County, Wyoming
- Frequency: 92.7 MHz
- Branding: The Peak

Programming
- Format: Adult contemporary

Ownership
- Owner: Legend Communications of Wyoming, LLC
- Sister stations: KBBS; KLGT; KZZS

History
- First air date: September 1, 2006
- Call sign meaning: "Heavy Rock Wyoming" (previous format)

Technical information
- Licensing authority: FCC
- Facility ID: 166062
- Class: C2
- ERP: 2,300 watts
- HAAT: 346 meters (1,135 ft)
- Transmitter coordinates: 44°37′20″N 107°6′57″W

Links
- Public license information: Public file; LMS

KHRW (92.7 FM, "The Peak") is a radio station licensed to Ranchester, Wyoming. It serves the Sheridan area, with an adult contemporary format. The station is owned by Legend Communications of Wyoming, LLC. KHRQ's studio is located on Coffeen Avenue in Sheridan, while tts transmitter is located southwest of Sheridan, near Red Grade Road.

== History ==
The station began as KHRW on September 1, 2006, owned by Horizon Christian Fellowship it aired a religious radio format serving the Ranchester area. In 2009, the station was sold to Global News Consultants, LLC. The station returned to air in April 2011 with a classic hits format provided by Dial Global Networks. Following the dissolution of the satellite format in 2012, the station chose to operate via local programming instead.

The station added a weekly hour-long Spanish show in December 2014, hosted by a local high school teacher.

On November 19, 2014, it was announced that the station would be acquired by Legend Communications, sold from former owner Global News Consultants for $262,000, along with sister station KYTS 105.7 FM from Manderson, Wyoming. The purchase was consummated on February 9, 2015.

In 2019, the station flipped formats to rock-oriented music and became known as "92.7 X Rock".

The station was an affiliate of the syndicated Pink Floyd program "Floydian Slip. In late June 2022, the station flipped formats from rock to Christian Contemporary and rebranded to "Grace FM". The station competes locally with 89.9 K-Love (K210AM), and Pilgrim Radio on 99.3 (K257EO).

In 2021, the station added newscasts from Virtual News Source, which is an out-of-market news provider. Previously, news for the station and its sisters was done in-house.

The station is owned by Legend Communications of Wyoming, one of the largest radio groups in the state. Legend operates stations in Gillette, Cody, and Worland as well. The group's owner is Larry Patrick. In February 2024, Susan Patrick, Larry's then-wife, was sentenced to 15 months in prison for willfully making and subscribing a false tax return by a Maryland federal judge. She was also ordered to pay approximately $3.84 million in restitution to the United States. This situation necessitated an urgent filing with the FCC to transfer her entire 50% stake in Legend Communications to her now ex-husband, Larry Patrick, for a token price of $1.00. This makes Larry Patrick the 100% equity holder, pending FCC approval.
