= KROE =

- Sheridan, Wyoming; United States
- Frequency: 930 kHz

Programming
- Format: talk radio
- Affiliations: Compass Media Networks; Fox News Radio; NBC News Radio; Premiere Networks; USA Radio Network; Westwood One

Ownership
- Owner: Lovcom, Inc.; (Sheridan Media)
- Sister stations: KLQQ; KWYO; KYTI; KZWY

History
- First air date: 1961
- Call sign meaning: "Crow Nation", the Native American tribe that used to live in the station's listening area

Technical information
- Licensing authority: FCC
- Facility ID: 38626
- Class: D
- Power: 5,000 watts (day); 117 watts (night)
- Transmitter coordinates: 44°47′54″N 106°55′51″W

Links
- Public license information: Public file; LMS
- Webcast: Listen live
- Website: sheridanmedia.com/kroe/

KROE (930 AM) is a radio station airing a talk radio format, licensed to Sheridan, Wyoming, and owned by Lovcom, Inc. The station features programming from Fox News Radio, NBC News Radio, Compass Media Networks, Premiere Networks, USA Radio Network, and Westwood One.

All Lovcom stations are located in the Sheridan Media Radio Center, on KROE Lane in Sheridan.

== History ==
KROE first signed on the air on March 18, 1961, with a studio located at 47 South Scott Street in Sheridan, Wyoming. Studios were then moved to the former KWYO studio location at 21 North Main Street in 1963 and later moved to a mobile home east of Sheridan on a road known as "dump road" (it led to the local landfill). A new building was erected adjacent to the mobile home and transmission tower when the present owner acquired the station in 1974. The company also added a sister station, KROE-FM, broadcasting at 94.9 MHz.

By the 1980s, KROE had increased power from 1,000 Watts to 5,000 Watts, and the road on which it was located had a new name: KROE Lane. The KROE building was renovated in 2001/2002, and as of 2017, it houses six radio stations (KROE, KWYO, KLQQ, KOWY, KYTI and KZWY), as well as multiple HD multicast channels and FM translators.

== Programming ==
In 1983, KROE stopped playing vinyl records on air and moved to a reel to reel medium. In the 1980s, popular programs included "Polka Party", featuring polka music and stories delivered in Polish. Another popular program was the Make Believe Ballroom, with 1940s big band music. The Polka Party ended in the mid 1990s, and the Big Band show moved to KWYO in 1998. The music on KROE was switched to a Westwood One satellite-delivered country music format in the 1990s.

In 1997, station owner Lovcom, Inc. acquired a competing FM station. The call letters of that station were changed from KWYO-FM to KYTI and it became the country music station, while the format on KROE was changed to oldies. Throughout the 80s and 90s, KROE was known for local sports coverage, including live play-by-play of local area football and basketball games. KROE changed formats again in July 2004, dropping music in favor of a strictly talk radio format. The sports coverage was moved to sister station KWYO.

Long-time programs remain on KROE, including Swap Shop (an on-air flea market), and the local public affairs call-in program, Public Pulse. KROE is a CBS news affiliate.

In January 2017, KROE began rebroadcasting at 103.9 FM on translator K280GK.
