= KYTI =

- Sheridan, Wyoming; United States
- Frequency: 93.7 MHz
- Branding: The Coyote 93.7 FM

Programming
- Format: Country
- Affiliations: Westwood One

Ownership
- Owner: Lovcom, Inc.; (Sheridan Media)
- Sister stations: KROE, KWYO, KZWY, KLQQ

History
- Former call signs: KLWD (1978–1993); KWYO-FM (1993–1997)

Technical information
- Licensing authority: FCC
- Facility ID: 12931
- Class: C
- ERP: 75,000 watts
- HAAT: 368 meters (1,207 ft)
- Transmitter coordinates: 44°37′20″N 107°6′57″W

Links
- Public license information: Public file; LMS
- Webcast: Listen Live
- Website: www.sheridanmedia.com/kyti

KYTI (93.7 FM) is a radio station broadcasting a country music format. Licensed to Sheridan, Wyoming, United States. The station is currently owned by Lovcom, Inc. and features programming from Westwood One.

All Lovcom stations are located in the Sheridan Media Radio Center, at 1716 KROE Lane on Sheridan's east side.

== History ==
The station initially signed on as KLWD at 96.5 FM in 1978. The original format was easy listening (the call letters intended to imply a "cloud.") In the early 80s the format was switched to AOR, and by the late 80s it had switched again to Oldies with programming including the syndicated "Solid Gold Saturday Night".

In 1993 the format was switched to Adult Contemporary, and the call letters were changed to KWYO-FM on June 11, 1993. In 1997, Lovcom, Inc. bought the station from Community Media. As part of that move, the country format on Lovcom's KROE was moved to the newly acquired FM, and on July 14, 1997, the station changed its call sign to the current KYTI.

Along with the call letter change, the station increased power to 75,000 Watts and moved to 93.7FM. The station added HD Radio programming in late 2005, with the HD-2 and HD-3 channels airing a variety of formats over the next several years, including Classic Country on HD-2 and Air America Radio on HD-3. The HD Radio multicast channels eventually settled on ESPN Radio programming on HD-2 and no HD-3 channel, but in early 2014, KYTI ceased all HD Radio programming.
