= KLQQ =

- Clearmont, Wyoming; United States
- Broadcast area: Sheridan, Wyoming
- Frequency: 104.9 MHz
- Branding: Q104.9

Programming
- Format: Contemporary hit radio

Ownership
- Owner: Lovcom, Inc; (Sheridan Media)
- Sister stations: KROE, KWYO, KYTI, KZWY

History
- First air date: June 30, 2006
- Former frequencies: 104.7 MHz (2006–2007)

Technical information
- Licensing authority: FCC
- Facility ID: 165310
- Class: C1
- ERP: 31,000 watts
- HAAT: 368 meters (1,207 ft)
- Transmitter coordinates: 44°37′19.8″N 107°6′59.2″W

Links
- Public license information: Public file; LMS
- Webcast: Listen live
- Website: sheridanmedia.com/klqq

KLQQ (104.9 FM) is a radio station broadcasting a contemporary hit radio format. Licensed to Clearmont, Wyoming, United States, the station serves the Sheridan area. It is owned by Lovcom, Inc.

All Lovcom stations are located in the Sheridan Media Radio Center, at 1716 KROE Lane on Sheridan's east side.

== History ==
The station was assigned the call sign KLQQ on June 6, 2006. The official sign-on occurred at 5pm MDT on Friday, June 30, 2006. The first song played was "Get The Party Started" by Pink. Broadcasting on 104.7 FM at 2,000 watts, KLQQ was the first radio station launched in the Sheridan, Wyoming, area with simultaneous analog and HD Radio programming. Two HD Radio multicast channels were added to the signal two weeks after the official sign-on. Originally, the HD-2 channel carried a hip hop format and HD-3 was "JokeJoke," a 24-hour comedy format. In July 2006, the multicast channel lineup changed to oldies on HD-2 and ESPN Radio on HD-3.

In October 2007, KLQQ increased power to 100,000 watts and moved to 104.9 FM. The HD Radio multicast channel lineup went through several changes, but through most of 2008 the lineup was smooth jazz on HD-2 and ESPN Radio on HD-3. In October 2008, the HD-3 channel was eliminated (The ESPN Radio channel was moved to another multicast channel on a sister station) and the bandwidth on the HD-2 channel increased to equal that of the HD-1 channel. At the same time the HD-2 channel programming was changed to the "AC Pure" format provided by Waitt Radio Networks, becoming the first HD Radio multicast affiliate for the network. The HD-2 channel was called "Magic 95.9" due to the HD-2 channel also being available on analog FM translator K240DW at 95.9 FM through a loophole in FCC rules regarding translators. On June 15, 2012, the HD-2 format was changed to active rock as "95.9 The Edge" and the "Magic" format was moved to a new analog signal on KOWY at 102.3 FM. Equipment failures forced KLQQ to cease HD Radio broadcasting in 2013, and the active rock format was moved to KZWY-HD3.

In 2016, KLQQ dropped from a class C0 to a class C1 and reduced ERP from 100,000 watts to 31,000 watts.

KLQQ's analog FM signal is also translated on K253AZ in Gillette, Wyoming at 98.5 FM.
