= KWYO =

Radio station in Sheridan, Wyoming

- Sheridan, Wyoming; United States
- Frequency: 1410 kHz

Programming
- Format: Classic country
- Affiliations: USA Radio News

Ownership
- Owner: Lovcom, Inc.; (Sheridan Media)
- Sister stations: KROE, KYTI, KZWY, KLQQ

History
- First air date: July 9, 1934
- Call sign meaning: Wyoming

Technical information
- Licensing authority: FCC
- Facility ID: 12942
- Class: B
- Power: 5,000 watts (day); 350 watts (night)
- Transmitter coordinates: 44°47′54″N 106°55′51″W
- Translator: 106.9 K295CP (Sheridan)

Links
- Public license information: Public file; LMS
- Webcast: Listen Live
- Website: sheridanmedia.com/kwyo

KWYO (1410 AM) is a radio station broadcasting a Classic Country music format. Licensed to Sheridan, Wyoming, United States, the station is currently owned by Lovcom, Inc. and features programming from USA Radio News.

All Lovcom stations are located in the Sheridan Media Radio Center, at 1716 KROE Lane on Sheridan's east side.

== History ==
KWYO signed on the air for the first time on Monday, July 9, 1934 at 7:00pm, becoming Sheridan, Wyoming's first radio station. (KWYO is the second oldest radio station in Wyoming, behind KTWO in Casper, which signed on as KDFN in 1930.) The original studio location was on the second floor of the Carroll's Furniture Store at 340 N. Main. During its early years, KWYO operated only at various times of the day, generally closing down in the afternoon from 1pm to 5pm. Between 1934 and 1941, the station increased its air time to a 17½ hour broadcast day. In 1941, the power was increased from 100 to 1000 watts and KWYO moved from 1370 to 1410 on the AM dial. In 1949, the studios were moved to the upper floor of the Gillette building at 21 North Main Street, and another move to 140 East Loucks occurred in 1961. In 1977, the power was increased to 5,000 watts. A sister FM station, KLWD (now KYTI), signed on at 96.5FM in 1978. In the mid 80s, the studios were relocated again, and throughout most of the 1990s, the programming originated from the 2nd floor of an office building at 2 North Main. In 1997, KWYO's studios were relocated to the Sheridan Media building at 1716 KROE Lane. In 2017, KWYO began simulcasting programming at 106.9 FM on translator K295CP.

Former logo

== Programming ==
KWYO began operation with 2,000 phonograph records ranging from grand opera to jazz. Through the 80s and 90s the station played country music from records and compact disc. When the studios moved to the Sheridan Media building the format on KWYO was changed to Westwood One's satellite-delivered "Adult Standards." Several years later, the music lineup was revamped slightly with a move to ABC's "Memories" format, and then again when that satellite format was dropped in favor of a Waitt Radio Networks provided Adult Contemporary format. At 1pm on January 29, 2008, the format was changed to "Oldies Plus," also provided by Waitt Radio Networks. A few years later, it was switched again to a Classic Country format provided by Westwood One. In addition to music, KWYO broadcasts Sheridan City Council meetings, and provides live play-by-play of Sheridan area football and basketball games. The station was an ABC News affiliate for many decades, but switched to CBS News in the mid-2010s.
