= KOWY =

- Dayton, Wyoming; United States
- Broadcast area: Sheridan, Wyoming
- Frequency: 102.3 MHz
- Branding: Magic 102.3

Programming
- Format: Adult contemporary

Ownership
- Owner: Lovcom, Inc.

History
- First air date: 2012

Technical information
- Licensing authority: FCC
- Facility ID: 189506
- Class: C3
- ERP: 2,100 watts
- HAAT: 343 meters (1,125 ft)
- Transmitter coordinates: 44°37′24″N 107°07′03″W

Links
- Public license information: Public file; LMS
- Webcast: Listen live
- Website: sheridanmedia.com/magic-102-3

KOWY (102.3 FM) is a radio station broadcasting an adult contemporary format. Licensed to Dayton, Wyoming, United States, the station serves the Sheridan, Wyoming area, and is owned by Lovcom, Inc.
