= KZZS =

- Story, Wyoming; United States
- Broadcast area: Sheridan, Wyoming and northeastern Wyoming
- Frequency: 98.3 MHz
- Branding: 98.3 The Peak

Programming
- Format: Adult Contemporary (silent)
- Affiliations: Westwood One

Ownership
- Owner: Legend Communications of Wyoming, LLC; (Big Horn Mountain Radio Network)
- Sister stations: KBBS, KHRW, KLGT

History
- First air date: December 1999
- Former call signs: KHWC (2001)

Technical information
- Licensing authority: FCC
- Facility ID: 89085
- Class: C1
- ERP: 100,000 watts
- HAAT: 75.9 meters
- Transmitter coordinates: 44°34′32″N 106°52′23″W

Links
- Public license information: Public file; LMS
- Webcast: Listen live (Only active during local sports)
- Website: Official website

KZZS (98.3 FM Wyoming's Lite-FM, 98-3 The Peak) is a radio station broadcasting an Adult Contemporary format. Licensed to Story, Wyoming, United States, the station serves the Sheridan area, along with most of northeastern Wyoming. The station is currently owned by Big Horn Mountain Radio Network, a division of Legend Communications of Wyoming, LLC, and features programming from Westwood One.

KZZS is located at 1221 Fort Street, west of Buffalo, along with KBBS, and KLGT. KLGT and KZZS share a transmitter site off East Eby Road, in Story, WY. Sister station KHRW had its studios at 324 Coffeen Avenue in Sheridan, however the studio was sold and all four stations are operated out of the Buffalo studio now.

== History ==
KZZS started as a construction permit in late 1999. The station was sold to Legend Communications of Wyoming in 2000.

The station was assigned the call sign KHWC on April 17, 2001. On August 17, 2001, the station changed its call sign to the current KZZS. KZZS received its license to cover on March 11, 2003.

In 2021, the station added newscasts from Virtual News Source, which is an out-of-market news provider. Previously, news for the station and its sisters was done in-house.

The station is owned by Legend Communications of Wyoming, one of the largest radio groups in the state. Legend operates stations in Gillette, Cody, and Worland as well. The group's owner is Larry Patrick. In February 2024, Susan Patrick, Larry's then-wife, was sentenced to 15 months in prison for willfully making and subscribing a false tax return by a Maryland federal judge. She was also ordered to pay approximately $3.84 million in restitution to the United States. This situation necessitated an urgent filing with the FCC to transfer her entire 50% stake in Legend Communications to her now ex-husband, Larry Patrick, for a token price of $1.00. This makes Larry Patrick the 100% equity holder, pending FCC approval.

As of November, 2025, the station was silent.
