= KLGT =

- Buffalo, Wyoming; United States
- Broadcast area: Northeastern Wyoming
- Frequency: 96.5 MHz
- Branding: KIX 96.5

Programming
- Format: Country (silent)

Ownership
- Owner: Legend Communications of Wyoming, LLC; (Big Horn Mountain Radio Network)
- Sister stations: KBBS, KZZS, KHRW

History
- First air date: December 6, 1982 (as KLGM)
- Former call signs: KLGM (1982–1986)
- Former frequencies: 92.9 MHz (1982–2011)
- Call sign meaning: K-LiGhT (previous format)

Technical information
- Licensing authority: FCC
- Facility ID: 12698
- Class: C1
- ERP: 100,000 watts
- HAAT: 101.4 metres (333 ft)
- Transmitter coordinates: 44°34′32″N 106°52′23″W

Links
- Public license information: Public file; LMS
- Website: Official website

KLGT (96.5 FM Hot Country Kix 96.5) is a radio station broadcasting a country music format. Licensed to Buffalo, Wyoming, United States, the station serves the Sheridan area, and most of northeastern Wyoming. The station is currently owned by Big Horn Mountain Radio Network, a division of Legend Communications of Wyoming, LLC.

KLGT shares studios with KBBS and KZZS at 1221 Fort Street west of Buffalo. KLGT and KZZS share a transmitter site off East Eby Road in Story, WY. Sister station KHRW has studios at 324 Coffeen Avenue in Sheridan.

KLGT and other Legend Communications stations KGWY, and KZMQ-FM hold an annual fundraiser for St. Jude Children's Hospital.

== History ==
KLGT began as a construction permit in 1982. The station was assigned the call letters KLGM on December 6, 1982. On April 1, 1986, the station changed its call sign to the current KLGT. The KLGT calls used to be in Breckenridge, Colorado. That station is now known as KSMT. KLGT initially broadcast on 92.9 MHz before eventually moving to its current frequency of 96.5 MHz.

In 2018, the station was a nominee for Radio Station of the Year, at the first annual Wyoming Country Music Awards.

In 2021, the station added newscasts from Virtual News Source, which is an out-of-market news provider. Previously, news for the station and its sisters was done in-house.

The station is owned by Legend Communications of Wyoming, one of the largest radio groups in the state. Legend operates stations in Gillette, Cody, and Worland as well. The group's owner is Larry Patrick. In February 2024, Susan Patrick, Larry's then-wife, was sentenced to 15 months in prison for willfully making and subscribing a false tax return by a Maryland federal judge. She was also ordered to pay approximately $3.84 million in restitution to the United States. This situation necessitated an urgent filing with the FCC to transfer her entire 50% stake in Legend Communications to her now ex-husband, Larry Patrick, for a token price of $1.00. This makes Larry Patrick the 100% equity holder, pending FCC approval.

As of November, 2025, the station was silent.
