= Wyoming Highway 212 =

State highway in Wyoming, United States

Wyoming Highway 212
- WYO 212 highlighted in red

Route information
- Maintained by WYDOT
- Length: 14.06 mi (22.63 km)

Major junctions
- CW end: I-25 / US 87 / I-25 BL / US 87 Bus. near Cheyenne
- I-25 BL / US 85 / US 87 Bus. in South Greeley; I-80 / I-80 BL in Fox Farm-College; I-80 BL / US 30 in Cheyenne
- CCW end: Hynds Boulevard in Ranchettes

Location
- Country: United States
- State: Wyoming
- Counties: Laramie

Highway system
- Wyoming State Highway System; Interstate; US; State
| ← WYO 211 | → WYO 213 |

Wyoming Highway 212 (WYO 212) is a 14-mile (23 km) state highway in Wyoming. It is locally known as Four Mile Road from Wyoming Highway 219 to East Four Mile Road intersection at the curve, and College Drive from US 85/I-25 BUS. SR 212 acts like a bypass of Cheyenne, but in some portions it sneaks into the city limits. The portions that the bypass enters the city limits are between the railroad tracks and Ranchettes, and the northern terminus. SR 212 is signed north–south.

== Route description ==
Wyoming Highway 212 begins at its southern end at Interstate 25 (Exit 7) and travels east and north around Cheyenne to Wyoming Highway 219 (Old Yellowstone Highway) north of Cheyenne. Beginning at I-25, Wyoming Highway 212 runs concurrent with Business Loop I-25 and US 87 Business until an intersection with South Greeley Highway (US 85). After that intersection, WYO 212 passes Laramie County Community College and turns northward toward Interstate 80. WYO 212 intersects Fox Farm Road (former Wyoming Highway 221) at 5.1 miles (8.2 km) before heading north to an interchange with I-80. Between the Interstate 80 interchange and US 30 (Lincolnway), Wyoming Highway 212 runs concurrent with Business Loop I-80. After intersecting US 30, WYO 212 heads north and intersects busy Dell Range Blvd. which is a busy commercial strip for shopping and stores. WYO 212 then heads north and west around Cheyenne, taking on the name Four Mile Road.

In the Ranchettes, at the intersection of Four Mile Road and WYO 219 (Yellowstone Road), WYO 212 approaches its northern end. WYO 212 ends at Hynds Boulevard, in front of I-25.

== Major intersections ==
The entire route is in Laramie County.

| Location | mi | km | Destinations | Notes |
|---|---|---|---|---|
| | 0.000 | 0.000 | I-25 (US 87) / I-25 BL begins / US 87 Bus. begins to I-80 – Ft. Collins | Diverging diamond interchange; clockwise terminus; clockwise end of I-25 Bus./US 87 Bus. concurrency; road continues south as Clear Creek Parkway; I-25 exit 7 |
| South Greeley | 2.705 | 4.353 | I-25 BL north / US 87 Bus. north / US 85 (South Greeley Highway) – Greeley | Clockwise end of I-25 Bus./US 87 Bus. concurrency |
| Fox Farm-College | 5.622 | 9.048 | I-80 / I-80 BL begins – Rock Springs, Sidney | Sun Valley Interchange, I-80 exit 364; clockwise end of I-80 Bus. concurrency |
| Fox Farm-College | | | Campstool Road | Interchange via connector road |
| Cheyenne | 6.875 | 11.064 | I-80 BL west / US 30 (Lincolnway) | Clockwise end of I-80 Bus. concurrency |
| Ranchettes | 13.567 | 21.834 | WYO 219 (Yellowstone Road) | |
| Ranchettes | 14.060 | 22.627 | Hynds Boulevard | Counterclockwise terminus |
1.000 mi = 1.609 km; 1.000 km = 0.621 mi: Concurrency terminus
