= Business routes of Interstate 25 =

Interstate 25 Business

Location
- Country: United States

Highway system
- Interstate Highway System; Main; Auxiliary; Suffixed; Business; Future

Interstate business routes are roads connecting a central or commercial district of a city or town with an Interstate bypass. These roads typically follow along local streets often along a former US or state highway that had been replaced by an Interstate. Interstate business route reassurance markers are signed as either loops or spurs using a green shield shaped sign and numbered like the shield of the parent Interstate Highway.

Along Interstate 25 (I-25), business routes are found in all three states through which I-25 passes: New Mexico, Colorado, and Wyoming. Some states regard Interstate business routes as fully integrated within their state highway system while other states consider them to be either local roads to be maintained by county or municipal authorities or a hybrid of state and local control. Every state along I-25 regards its business routes as fully incorporated members of their respective state maintained highway systems.

Although the public may differentiate between different business routes by the number of the parent route and the location of the route, there is no uniform naming convention. Each state highway department internally uses its own designations to identify segments within its jurisdiction.

== New Mexico ==
All the business loops within New Mexico are maintained by the New Mexico Department of Transportation (NMDOT). In New Mexico, Interstate business routes are named independently of their parent Interstate's designation with business loops of I-25 numbered between 10 and 19, those of I-10 between 20 and 29, and those of I-40 between 30 and 39. New Mexico business loop numbers ascend eastward and northward with gaps in numbering to allow for future designations. I-25 begins with a business route through Williamsburg and Truth or Consequences before proceeding northward with additional routes serving the towns of Socorro, Belen, Las Vegas, Springer, and Raton. These routes largely conform to the current or former alignment of the unsigned US Highway 85 (US 85) through these communities before the construction of I-25. NMDOT has decommissioned US 85 throughout the state and no longer signs the highway along its length, as US 85 entirely follows I-25 with the single exception of the business loop in Las Vegas. The American Association of State Highway and Transportation Officials (AASHTO), however, continues to recognize the New Mexico portion of US 85 maintaining continuity with sections in adjacent states.

=== Williamsburg–Truth or Consequences business loop ===
Interstate 25 Business
- Business Loop 11
- Location: Williamsburg–Truth or Consequences
- Length: 5.711 mi (9.191 km)

Interstate 25 Business (I-25 Bus.), inventoried as Business Loop 11 (BL 11), is a 5.711-mile (9.191 km) business loop serving the cities of Williamsburg and Truth or Consequences in Sierra County. The loop begins at exit 75 of I-25 in Williamsburg, intersecting State Road 187 (NM 187), traveling northeast on Broadway Street through Truth or Consequences until meeting Main Avenue. Between that point and Date Street, the route follows two one-way roads with Broadway carrying northbound traffic and Main conveying traffic to the south. The routes combine and turn north on Date Street, intersecting the western terminus of NM 51. Turning northwest, the highway intersects NM 181 and terminates at exit 79 on I-25 on the north side of Truth or Consequences.

Most of the loop, with the exception of its I-25 interchanges, was previously part of US 85, which joined the route from the south at NM 187 and departed to the north along NM 181.

Major intersections

The entire route is in Sierra County.

Location	mi	km	Destinations	Notes
Williamsburg	0.000	0.000	I-25 / US 85 – Las Cruces, Albuquerque	Southern terminus
Williamsburg	0.415	0.668	NM 187 south	Northern terminus of NM 187
Truth or Consequences	3.592	5.781	NM 51 east (Third Avenue) – Elephant Butte, Engle	Western terminus of NM 51
Truth or Consequences	4.848	7.802	NM 181 north – Elephant Butte State Park	Southern terminus of NM 181
Truth or Consequences	5.711	9.191	I-25 / US 85 – Las Cruces, Albuquerque	Northern terminus
1.000 mi = 1.609 km; 1.000 km = 0.621 mi

=== Socorro business loop ===
Interstate 25 Business
- Business Loop 12
- Location: Socorro
- Length: 2.879 mi (4.633 km)

Interstate 25 Business (I-25 Bus.), inventoried as Business Loop 12 (BL 12), is a 2.879-mile (4.633 km) business loop serving the city of Socorro in Socorro County. The loop begins at exit 147 of I-25 and travels northwest along California Avenue until an intersection with the northern terminus of NM 1. The loop turns north as a divided highway as it enters the city. US 60 intersects from the west, and the loop becomes concurrent with US 60 as the pair of highways continue to the north. The loop terminates at exit 150 on I-25, and US 60 continues along the Interstate as it exits Socorro.

Major intersections

The entire route is in Socorro County.

Location	mi	km	Destinations	Notes
Socorro	0.000	0.000	I-25 / US 85 – Las Cruces, Albuquerque	Southern terminus
	0.366	0.589	NM 1 south	Northern terminus of NM 1
	1.055	1.698	US 60 west (Spring Street) – VLA	Southern end of US 60 concurrency
	2.879	4.633	I-25 / US 60 east / US 85 – Las Cruces, Albuquerque	Northern terminus; northern end of US 60 concurrency
1.000 mi = 1.609 km; 1.000 km = 0.621 mi: Concurrency terminus

=== Belen business loop ===
Interstate 25 Business
- Business Loop 13
- Location: Belen
- Length: 6.645 mi (10.694 km)

Interstate 25 Business (I-25 Bus.), inventoried as Business Loop 13 (BL 13), is a 6.645-mile (10.694 km) business loop serving the city of Belen in Valencia County. The loop begins at exit 190 on I-25 and intersects the northern terminus of NM 116 as the highway travels north along Main Street into the city. The western terminus of NM 309 is met in central Belen. The loop continues north to NM 314 then turns northwest before terminating at exit 195 on I-25.

Major intersections

The entire route is in Valencia County.

Location	mi	km	Destinations	Notes
Belen	0.000	0.000	I-25 / US 85 – Socorro, Albuquerque	Southern terminus
	0.700	1.127	NM 116 south	Northern terminus of NM 116
	2.310	3.718	NM 309 east (Reinken Avenue)	Western terminus of NM 309
	4.605	7.411	NM 314 north – Los Lunas	Southern terminus of NM 314
	6.645	10.694	I-25 / US 85 – Socorro, Albuquerque	Northern terminus
1.000 mi = 1.609 km; 1.000 km = 0.621 mi

=== Santa Fe business loop ===
Interstate 25 Business
- Business Loop 14
- Location: Santa Fe
- Length: 9.370 mi (15.080 km)

Interstate 25 Business (I-25 Bus.), inventoried as Business Loop 14 (BL 14), was a 9.37-mile (15.08 km) business loop that served Santa Fe in Santa Fe County. The loop began at exit 278 on I-25 and traveled northeast along NM 14 (Cerrillos Road). It then went east on NM 466 (Saint Michaels Drive), cutting through the south side of Santa Fe. The road ended up as Old Pecos Trail and remained so until reaching I-25 again and terminating at exit 284. The route was decommissioned.

Major intersections

The entire route is in Santa Fe County.

Location	mi	km	Destinations	Notes
	0.000	0.000	I-25 / US 85 / NM 14 (Cerrillos Road)	Western terminus; begins concurrency with NM 14
Agua Fria	2.704	4.352	NM 300 (Rodeo Road) / NM 284 (Airport Road)	Western terminus of NM 300; eastern terminus of NM 284
Santa Fe	5.580	8.980	NM 14 (Cerrillos Road) / NM 466 (St Michaels Drive)	Ends concurrency with NM 14; begins concurrency with NM 466
	6.790	10.927	US 84 / US 285 (St Francis Drive)	Interchanges US 84 and US 285
	9.093	14.634	NM 466 (Old Pecos Trail) / NM 300 (Old Las Vegas Hwy.)	Intersects NM 300
	9.370	15.080	I-25 / US 84 / US 85 / US 285 (Old Pecos Trail) / NM 466	Eastern terminus; ends concurrency with NM 466; NM 466 continues south
1.000 mi = 1.609 km; 1.000 km = 0.621 mi: Concurrency terminus

=== Las Vegas business loop ===
Interstate 25 Business
- Business Loop 15
- Location: Las Vegas
- Length: 4.240 mi (6.824 km)

Interstate 25 Business (I-25 Bus.), inventoried as Business Loop 15 (BL 15), is a 4.24-mile (6.82 km) business loop serving Las Vegas in San Miguel County. It also carries unsigned US 85. The loop begins at exit 343 of I-25 and travels northeast, intersecting NM 329. The loop continues north, passing to the west of Las Vegas station served by the Southwest Chief line of Amtrak, just south of the intersection with NM 104. Continuing north, the highway passes east of Municipal Park before terminating at NM 250 and I-25 at exit 347.

Major intersections

The entire route is in Las Vegas, San Miguel County.

mi	km	Destinations	Notes
0.000	0.000	I-25 / Santa Fe Trail Scenic Byway to US 84 south – Santa Fe, Raton	Southern terminus; road continues as Grand Avenue
0.341	0.549	NM 329 north (New Mexico Avenue)	Southern terminus of NM 329
		7th Street / Jackson Street / Santa Fe Trail Scenic Byway to NM 518	
2.117	3.407	NM 104 east (University Avenue) – Conchas Lake, Tucumcari	Western terminus of NM 104
		Mills Avenue to NM 518 / NM 65 – Luna Community College	Former NM 329
4.240	6.824	I-25 / NM 250 north – Santa Fe, Springer, Raton	Northern terminus; road continues as NM 250; serves Las Vegas Municipal Airport
1.000 mi = 1.609 km; 1.000 km = 0.621 mi: Route transition

=== Springer business loop ===
Interstate 25 Business
- Business Loop 16
- Location: Springer
- Length: 3.430 mi (5.520 km)

Interstate 25 Business (I-25 Bus.), inventoried as Business Loop 16 (BL 16), is an unsigned 3.43-mile (5.52 km) business loop serving the city of Springer in Colfax County. The loop begins at exit 412 of I-25 and travels northeast along Railroad Avenue. The loop serves as the main north–south road in the town and intersects Fourth Street, which, to the west of the loop, is NM 21 and, to the east, is US 56 and US 412. Continuing northwest, the loop intersects NM 468 and then runs closely parallel to the Interstate before merging at exit 414.

Major intersections

The entire route is in Colfax County.

Location	mi	km	Destinations	Notes
	0.000	0.000	I-25 (US 85) – Las Vegas, Raton	Southern terminus; I-25 exit 412
Springer	1.258	2.025	US 56 / US 412 east (Fourth Street east) / NM 21 west (Fourth Street west) – Miami, Clayton	Western termini of US 56 and US 412; eastern terminus of NM 21
Springer	1.827	2.940	NM 468 west – Springer Correctional Facility, Lake Springer	Eastern terminus of NM 468
	3.430	5.520	I-25 (US 85) – Raton	Northern terminus; I-25 exit 414
1.000 mi = 1.609 km; 1.000 km = 0.621 mi

=== Raton business loop ===
Interstate 25 Business
- Business Loop 17
- Location: Raton
- Length: 4.161 mi (6.696 km)

Interstate 25 Business (I-25 Bus.), inventoried as Business Loop 17 (BL 17), is a 4.161-mile (6.696 km) business loop that begins at exit 450 on I-25 south of Raton in Colfax County concurrent with US 64. The two highways intersect NM 555 then pass east of La Mesa Park, traveling along Second Street north into the city. Clayton Road takes US 64 off of the loop to the east as the loop continues north, crossing over the rail line that serves Raton station before turning northwest and terminating at exit 454 on I-25.

Major intersections

The entire route is in Colfax County.

Location	mi	km	Destinations	Notes
Raton	0.000	0.000	I-25 / US 64 west / US 85 – Springer, Trinidad, CO	Southern terminus; begin overlay of US 64
Raton	0.440	0.708	NM 555 west (York Canyon Road)	Eastern terminus of NM 555
Raton	1.627	2.618	US 64 east (Clayton Road) – Clayton, Amarillo, TX	End overlay of US 64
	4.161	6.696	I-25 / US 85 / US 87 – Springer, Trinidad, CO	Northern terminus
1.000 mi = 1.609 km; 1.000 km = 0.621 mi: Concurrency terminus

== Colorado ==
All Interstate business routes in Colorado are maintained by the Colorado Department of Transportation (CDOT). Within Colorado, all highways maintained by the state are classified as state highways, including Interstates and US Highways which hold the same numerical designations as their nationally established routes. The numerical values of all state highway names are followed by an alphabetic suffix, although this convention is used by the department internally and not reflected in route signage. Hence, the mainline of I-25 throughout the length of the state is classified as State Highway 25A (SH 25A) while its two business routes in Aguilar and Walsenburg are internally named SH 25B and SH 25C, respectively. US 85 and US 87 are hidden routes not recognized nor signed by CDOT in southern Colorado. They are, however, established AASHTO routes maintaining continuity with signed portions in other states along their routes. In southern Colorado, the routes primarily follow I-25, including at Aguilar, but with deviations, such as along the Walsenburg business route. In addition to these, US 160 joins I-25 at Walsenburg and follows concurrently with the Interstate to Trinidad, including the portion bypassing Aguilar. Thus, in Walsenburg, US 160 crosses the business route in the town center and again at the business route's southern terminus.

=== Trinidad business loop ===
Interstate 25 Business
- State Highway 25A
- Location: Trinidad
- Length: 0.5 mi (800 m)

Interstate 25 Business (I-25 Bus.), inventoried as State Highway 25A (SH 25A), was a business route of I-25 that connected Trinidad in Las Animas County to the Interstate. The 0.5-mile (0.80 km) route began as Animas Street, coming from University Street at a diamond interchange at exit 13 on I-25. The route was concurrent with US 160 along Main Street. The route turned southwest on Main Street and terminated at I-25. In 2009, a reconstruction project involved a replacement of the northbound viaduct crossing the Purgatoire River and more reconstruction in 2011, adding a new diamond interchange at Main Street and I-25 and replacing the antiquated ramps at Animas and University streets, which ultimately eliminated the route.

Major intersections

The entire route is in Las Animas County.

Location	mi	km	Destinations	Notes
Trinidad	0.000	0.000	I-25 / US 85 / US 87 / US 160 – Trinidad, Pueblo	Northern terminus; roadway continues as University Street
	0.049	0.079	US 160 north (Animas Street) – Trinidad	Begin overlay of US 160
	0.2	0.32	US 160 south (Main Street) – Trinidad	End overlay of US 160
	0.5	0.80	I-25 / US 85 / US 87 / US 160 – Trinidad, Pueblo	Southern terminus
1.000 mi = 1.609 km; 1.000 km = 0.621 mi: Concurrency terminus

=== Aguilar business spur ===
Interstate 25 Business
- State Highway 25B
- Location: Aguilar
- Length: 1.981 mi (3.188 km)

Interstate 25 Business (I-25 Bus.), inventoried as State Highway 25B (SH 25B), is a business spur of I-25 connecting the town of Aguilar in Las Animas County to the Interstate. The 1.981-mile (3.188 km) route begins at the corner of Main and Fir streets in Aguilar. The spur proceeds for one block north along North Fir Street before turning to the northwest along Lynn Road away from town. The route turns east along County Road 60 (CR 60) immediately before terminating at I-25 exit 34.

Major intersections

The entire route is in Las Animas County.

Location	mi	km	Destinations	Notes
Aguilar	0.000	0.000	Main Street / S. Fir Street	Western terminus; roadway continues south as S. Fir Street
	1.981	3.188	I-25 / US 85 / US 87 / US 160 – Trinidad, Pueblo	Eastern terminus; roadway continues east as County Road 60
1.000 mi = 1.609 km; 1.000 km = 0.621 mi

=== Walsenburg business loop ===
Interstate 25 Business
- State Highway 25C
- Location: Walsenburg
- Length: 4.356 mi (7.010 km)

Interstate 25 Business (I-25 Bus.), inventoried as State Highway 25C (SH 25C), is a business loop of I-25 serving the town of Walsenburg in Huerfano County. The 4.356-mile (7.010 km) route begins at I-25 exit 49 and proceeds to the west along the southern edge of Walsenburg. The route then turns to the northwest along Walsen Avenue. At Seventh Street, US 160 intersects from the west US 160 runs concurrently with the loop until US 160 turns off to the east along Fifth Street to I-25. The loop then continues northeast along Walsen Avenue, leaving town, and intersects SH 69 before terminating at I-25 exit 52.

CDOT does not recognize or sign US 85 in the southernmost part of its route within the state, nor does it recognize US 87 anywhere within Colorado, as they are redundant with other routes in the state highway system. The highways remain established by AASHTO primarily along I-25 in southern Colorado and along Walsenburg's I-25 business route.

Major intersections

The entire route is in Huerfano County.

Location	mi	km	Destinations	Notes
Walsenburg	0.000	0.000	I-25 / US 85 south / US 87 south / US 160 – Trinidad, Pueblo	Southern terminus; begin overlay of US 85 / US 87
Walsenburg	1.397	2.248	US 160 west (Seventh Street) – Alamosa	Begin overlay of US 160
Walsenburg	1.542	2.482	US 160 east (Fifth Street)	End overlay of US 160
	3.669	5.905	SH 69 west – Westcliffe	Eastern terminus of SH 69
	4.356	7.010	I-25 / US 85 north / US 87 north – Trinidad, Pueblo	Northern terminus; end overlay of US 85 / US 87
1.000 mi = 1.609 km; 1.000 km = 0.621 mi: Concurrency terminus

=== Colorado Springs business loop ===
Interstate 25 Business
- State Highway 25 Business
- Location: Colorado Springs, Colorado
- Length: 6.750 mi (10.863 km)
- Existed: 2007

Interstate 25 Business (I-25 Bus.), inventoried as State Highway 25 Business (SH 25 Bus.), was a business loop of I-25 that served downtown Colorado Springs and Northeast Colorado Springs. The route started at exit 140 on I-25 and ran along with Nevada Avenue. This route was also part of the CanAm Highway. It was a four-lane divided street that took a straight shot through downtown going north. The route terminated at exit 148 at I-25. In 2007, actions were taken to decommission the route, along with SH 38 and portions of SH 83, in an effort to add the alignment of SH 21 (Powers Boulevard).

Major intersections

The entire route is in El Paso County.

Location	mi	km	Destinations	Notes
Colorado Springs	0.000	0.000	I-25 / US 24 / US 85 / US 87	Southern terminus
	6.750	10.863	I-25 / US 85 / US 87	Northern terminus
1.000 mi = 1.609 km; 1.000 km = 0.621 mi

=== Castle Rock business loop ===
Interstate 25 Business
- State Highway 25 Business
- Location: Castle Rock
- Length: 1.200 mi (1.931 km)
- Existed: 1996

Interstate 25 Business (I-25 Bus.), inventoried as State Highway 25 Business (SH 25 Bus.), was a business loop that served the westside of Castle Rock. The route began at exit 181 as Plum Creek Pkwy and headed northwest. It then turned northeast on CR 46 (Wolfensburger Road), heading back to the Interstate, and then terminated at exit 182 as Wilcox Street. The route was decommissioned in 1996 and was likely unsigned.

Major intersections

The entire route is in Douglas County.

Location	mi	km	Destinations	Notes
Castle Rock	0.000	0.000	I-25 / US 85 / US 87	Southern terminus
	1.200	1.931	I-25 / US 85 / US 87	Northern terminus
1.000 mi = 1.609 km; 1.000 km = 0.621 mi

== Wyoming ==
All business routes of I-25 within Wyoming are maintained by the Wyoming Department of Transportation (WYDOT). Wyoming has no naming convention for disambiguation between different business routes with all designated simply as I-25 Business (I-25 Bus.) along the Interstate. I-25 has seven business routes within the state. Road concurrences are frequent in Wyoming, and the seven business highways often overlay multiple other highways, including US 87 Bus., wholly or partly at most of these seven locations, as US 87 largely follows I-25 throughout the state.

=== Cheyenne business loop ===
Interstate 25 Business
- Location: Cheyenne
- Length: 7.863 mi (12.654 km)

U.S. Highway 87 Business
- Location: Cheyenne
- Length: 7.863 mi (12.654 km)

Interstate 25 Business (I-25 Bus.) and U.S. Highway 87 Business (US 87 Bus.) are business loops serving the city of Cheyenne in Laramie County. The 8.006-mile (12.884 km) multiplexed highway begins at exit 7 of I-25/US 87 and is routed along Wyoming Highway 212 (WYO 212) and named College Drive. At just over 2.5 miles (4.0 km), US 85 is intersected. Here, I-25 Bus. leaves WYO 212, turns north onto US 85, and remains paired with it until its end. I-25 Bus./US 85/US 87 Bus. enter Cheyenne from the south and intersect I-80 at exit 362. At this point, I-180 begins. Despite the Interstate designation, the I-180 portion is not a freeway. The I-180 concurrency only lasts for just over one mile (1.6 km) as I-180 ends at I-80 Bus./US 30 along Lincolnway. I-25 Bus. continues north with US 85 and US 87 Bus. now as a one-way couplet through central Cheyenne northbound as Warren Avenue and southbound as Central Avenue. Near Cheyenne Regional Airport, the one-way streets combine and continue as Central Avenue before intersecting the southern terminus of WYO 219 at Yellowstone Road. I-25 Bus. and US 87 Bus. terminate at exit 12 of I-25/US 87. Here, US 85 joins those routes northbound.

Major intersections

The entire route is in Laramie County.

Location	mi	km	Destinations	Notes
	0.000	0.000	I-25 / US 87 to I-80 – Ft. Collins WYO 212 begins / Clear Creek Parkway	Braided interchange; I-25 BL/US 87 Bus./WYO 212 southern terminus; southern end of WYO 212 concurrency; road continues as Clear Creek Parkway; I-25 exit 7
South Greeley–Fox Farm-College line	2.705	4.353	US 85 south (South Greeley Highway south) / WYO 212 east (College Drive east) – Greeley, Laramie County Community College	Northern end of WYO 212 concurrency; southern end of US 85 concurrency
Cheyenne	3.906	6.286	I-180 begins / I-80 to US 30 west – Rock Springs, Sidney	Southern end of I-180 concurrency; I-80 exit 362
Cheyenne	See I-180			
Cheyenne	4.993	8.035	I-180 ends / I-80 BL / US 30 (Lincolnway)	Northern end of I-180 concurrency
Cheyenne	7.043	11.335	Yellowstone Road (WYO 219 north)	WYO 219 southern terminus
Cheyenne	7.863	12.654	I-25 / US 85 north / US 87 – Fort Collins, Torrington, Casper Central Avenue (WYO 224 west) / I-25 BL ends / US 87 Bus. ends – Wyoming Department of Transportation, Game and Fish, Warren AFB, National Guard	I-25 BL/US 87 Bus. northern terminus; I-25 exit 12; northern end of US 85 concurrency; road continues west as Central Avenue (WYO 224)
1.000 mi = 1.609 km; 1.000 km = 0.621 mi: Concurrency terminus

=== Chugwater business loop ===
Interstate 25 Business
- Location: Chugwater
- Length: 3.28 mi (5.28 km)

Interstate 25 Business (I-25 Bus.) is a business route signed as WYO 321 and serving the town of Chugwater in southeastern Platte County. The highway begins at exit 54 of I-25/US 87. At this interchange lies the northern terminus of WYO 211. Here, I-25 Bus. travels east past the Chugwater rest area. At 0.6 miles (0.97 km) is the western terminus of WYO 313. Less than three miles (4.8 km) later, I-25 Bus. (WYO 321) reaches I-25/US 87 at exit 57, where they both end. WYO 321 is signed from the freeway as I-25 Bus. and serves as a de facto business route; however, I-25 Bus. is not signed anywhere along WYO 321.

=== Wheatland business loop ===
Interstate 25 Business
- Location: Wheatland
- Length: 2.946 mi (4.741 km)

U.S. Highway 87 Business
- Location: Wheatland
- Length: 2.946 mi (4.741 km)

Interstate 25 Business (I-25 Bus.) and U.S. Highway 87 Business (US 87 Bus.) are concurrent business loops serving the town of Wheatland in central Platte County. I-25 Bus./US 87 Bus. begin at exit 78 of I-25/US 87. Here, I-25 Bus./US 87 Bus. begin on a short section of Mariposa Parkway but then turn north onto South Wheatland Highway for 0.3 miles (0.48 km). WYO 310 and WYO 312 are then intersected as the business routes turn east along South Street. The business routes turn north 0.5 miles (0.80 km) later onto 9th Street and intersect WYO 316 (Gilchrist Street) shortly after. Further north, the southern terminus of WYO 320 is intersected as the business loops become South Swanson Road. At 2.95 miles (4.75 km), I-25 Bus./US 87 Bus. meet I-25/US 87 at exit 80 where they end.

Major intersections

The entire route is in Wheatland, Platte County.

mi	km	Destinations	Notes
0.000	0.000	I-25 / US 87 – Cheyenne, Douglas	I-25 exit 78; I-25 BL/US 87 Bus. southern terminus; road continues west as Mariposa Parkway
0.473	0.761	South Street (WYO 312 west) / 16th Street to WYO 310	
1.165	1.875	WYO 316 east (Gilchrist Street)	
2.082	3.351	WYO 320 north – Laramie River Power Station, Grayrocks Reservoir	
2.946	4.741	I-25 / US 87 – Cheyenne, Douglas	I-25 exit 80; I-25 BL/US 87 Bus. northern terminus; road continues west, unpaved, as Swanson Road
1.000 mi = 1.609 km; 1.000 km = 0.621 mi

=== Douglas business loop ===
Interstate 25 Business
- Location: Douglas
- Length: 4.966 mi (7.992 km)

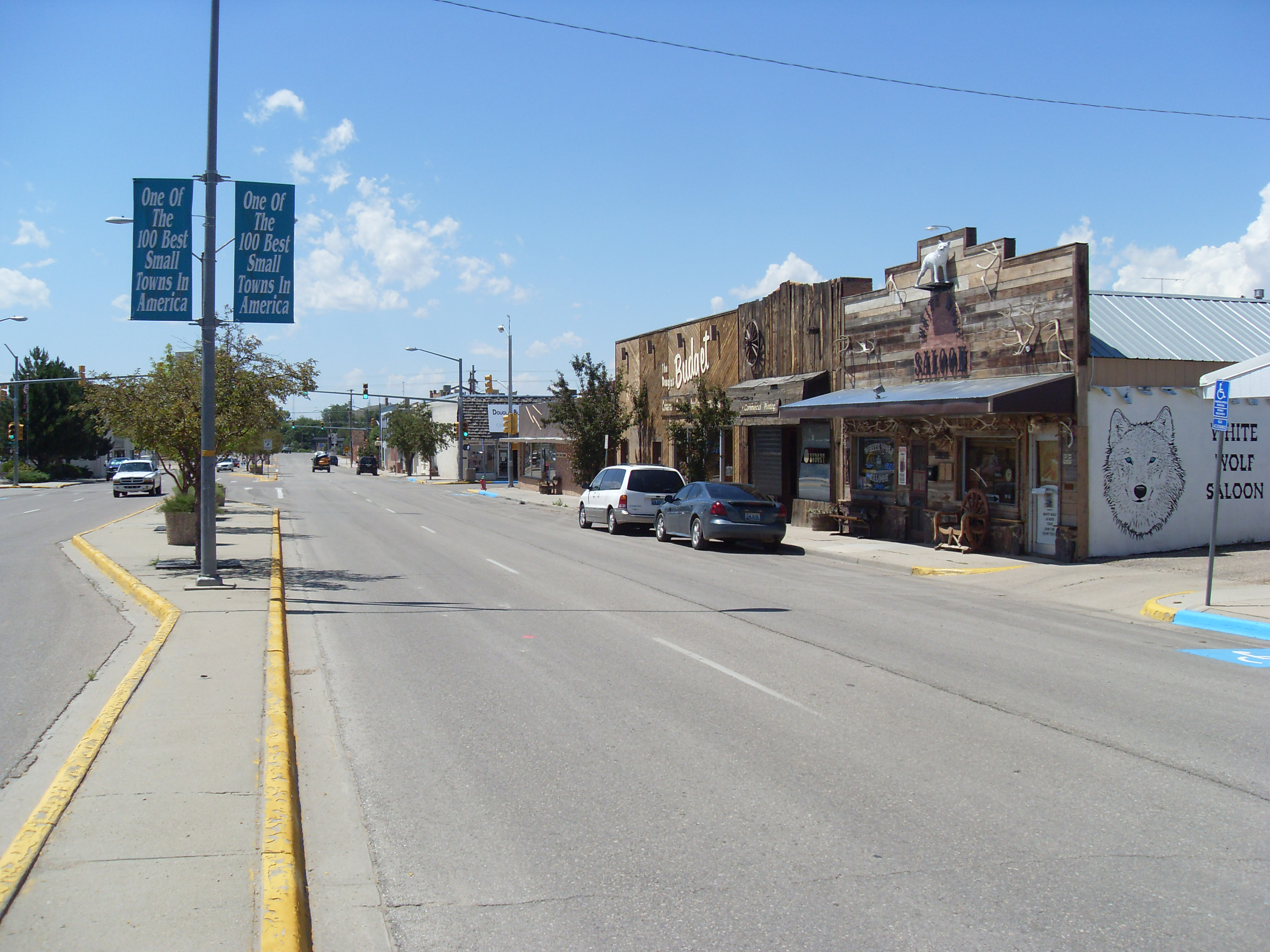
Center Street—Douglas, WY

U.S. Highway 20 Business
- Location: Douglas
- Length: 4.966 mi (7.992 km)

U.S. Highway 26 Business
- Location: Douglas
- Length: 4.966 mi (7.992 km)

U.S. Highway 87 Business
- Location: Douglas
- Length: 4.966 mi (7.992 km)

Interstate 25 Business (I-25 Bus.), U.S. Highway 20 Business (US 20 Bus.), U.S. Highway 26 Business (US 26 Bus.), and U.S. Highway 87 Business (US 87 Bus.) are concurrent 4.966-mile (7.992 km) business loops serving the town of Douglas in southern Converse County. I-25 Bus./US 20 Bus./US 26 Bus./US 87 Bus. begin at exit 135 of I-25/US 20/US 26/US 87 southeast of Douglas. The loops follow East Richards Street into Douglas. At South 4th Street, the loops turn north through Douglas. The loops turn west onto Center Street one mile (1.6 km) later, which becomes Yellowstone Highway. Near their end, the northern terminus of WYO 94 and the southern terminus of WYO 59 are intersected at Riverbend Drive. Past that intersection, the business routes rejoin I-25/US 20/US 26/US 87 at exit 140.

Major intersections

The entire route is in Douglas, Converse County.

mi	km	Destinations	Notes
0.000	0.000	I-25 / US 20 / US 26 / US 87 – Cheyenne, Casper	I-25 exit 135; I-25 Bus./US 87 Bus. southern terminus; US 20 Bus./US 26 Bus. eastern terminus
4.599	7.401	WYO 59 north / WYO 94 south (Riverbend Drive) to WYO 91 – Gillette, Esterbrook, Law Enforcement Academy, Eastern Wyoming College Douglas Campus	
4.966	7.992	I-25 / US 20 / US 26 / US 87 – Cheyenne, Casper	I-25 exit 140; I-25 Bus./US 87 Bus. northern terminus; US 20 Bus./US 26 Bus. western terminus
1.000 mi = 1.609 km; 1.000 km = 0.621 mi

=== Glenrock business loop ===
Interstate 25 Business
- Location: Glenrock
- Length: 6.98 mi (11.23 km)

Interstate 25 Business (I-25 Bus.) is a business route serving the town of Glenrock in Converse County. I-25 Bus. begins at exit 165 of I-25. The business route travels north, concurrent with WYO 95, into Glenrock on Deer Creek Road and then South 4th Street. At approximately two miles (3.2 km), I-25 Bus./WYO 95 intersect US 20/US 26/US 87. Here, I-25 Bus. turns east onto Birch Street to travel with US 20/US 26/US 87 for the remainder of its route, while WYO 95 turns west onto Birch Street. I-25 Bus. continues east out of Glenrock, intersecting the northern terminus of WYO 90 (Boxelder Road), before reaching its eastern end at exit 160 of I-25. US 20/US 26/US 87 join eastbound I-25.

Major intersections

The entire route is in Converse County.

Location	mi	km	Destinations	Notes
	0.000	0.000	US 20 / US 26 east / US 87 south / I-25 – Douglas, Casper	I-25 exit 160; I-25 BL eastern terminus; western end of US 20 / US 26 / US 87 concurrency
Glenrock	4.900	7.886	US 20 west / US 26 west / US 87 north / WYO 95 north	Eastern end of US 20 / US 26 / US 87 concurrency; western end of WYO 95 concurrency
	6.98	11.23	WYO 95 ends / I-25 – Douglas, Casper	Western terminus of I-25 BL; west end of concurrency with WYO 95; southern terminus of WYO 95; I-25 exit 165; road continues as CR 19 (Don't Litter)
1.000 mi = 1.609 km; 1.000 km = 0.621 mi: Concurrency terminus

=== Casper business loop ===
Interstate 25 Business
- Location: Casper
- Length: 2.195 mi (3.533 km)

U.S. Highway 87 Business
- Location: Casper
- Length: 2.195 mi (3.533 km)

Interstate 25 Business (I-25 Bus.) and U.S. Route 87 Business is a concurrent business loop serving the city of Casper in eastern Natrona County. The 2.20-mile (3.54 km) loop begins at exit 188A of I-25, heading south on Center Street along with and unsigned WYO 255. The loop turns left onto 1st Street, where it joins US 20 Bus. and US 26 Bus. WYO 251 intersects the loop from the south along Wolcott and Durbin streets before US 20 / US 26 / US 87 depart on Yellowstone Highway and their respective business routes end. The loop ends at exit 186 of I-25.

Major intersections

The entire route is in Casper, Natrona County.

mi	km	Destinations	Notes
0.000	0.000	I-25 / US 20 / US 26 / US 87 / WYO 255 begin – Buffalo, Shoshoni, Cheyenne	I-25 exit 188A; I-25 BL / US 87 Bus. / WYO 255 northern terminus; northern end of unsigned WYO 255 concurrency; road continues north as Center Street
0.480	0.772	US 20 Bus. west / US 26 Bus. west (1st Street west) / WYO 255 ends	Northern end of US 20 Bus. / US 26 Bus. concurrency; southern end of unsigned WYO 255 concurrency
0.546– 0.620	0.879– 0.998	Wolcott Street / Durbin Street (WYO 251 south)	One-way pair
2.190– 2.195	3.524– 3.533	I-25 / US 20 west / US 26 west / US 87 north / Beverly Street (to Bryan Stock Trail) – Cheyenne US 20 east / US 26 east / US 87 south / US 20 Bus. ends / US 26 Bus. ends (Yellowstone Highway)	I-25 exit 186; I-25 BL / US 87 Bus. southern terminus; US 20 Bus. / US 26 Bus. eastern terminus; road continues east as US 20 / US 26 / US 87
1.000 mi = 1.609 km; 1.000 km = 0.621 mi: Concurrency terminus

=== Buffalo business loop ===
Interstate 25 Business
- Location: Buffalo
- Length: 3.314 mi (5.333 km)

Interstate 25 Business (I-25 Bus.) is a business loop serving the city of Buffalo in Johnson County that runs concurrently with US 87 Bus. The 1.673-mile (2.692 km) loop begins at exit 298 of I-25/US 87 south of Buffalo. I-25 Bus. intersects WYO 196 0.5 miles (0.80 km) into its route as it follows Main Street into Buffalo. US 16 joins the loop at Fort Street one mile (1.6 km) later. US 16 has a short 0.5-mile (0.80 km) concurrency with the loop until Hart Street, where it turns east along I-90 Bus. I-90 Bus. joins the route for a 1.5-mile (2.4 km) concurrency to their termini at exit 56A of I-90/US 87 north of Buffalo, just west of the I-25 northern terminus.

Major intersections

The entire route is in Johnson County.

Location	mi	km	Destinations	Notes
	0.000	0.000	US 87 Bus. begins / I-25 / US 87 to I-90 – Gillette, Sheridan, Casper	I-25 exit 298; I-25 BL / US 87 Bus. southern terminus; southern end of US 87 Bus. concurrency
Buffalo	0.426	0.686	WYO 196 south	
Buffalo	1.256	2.021	US 16 west (Fort Street) – Worland, Yellowstone	Southern end of US 16 concurrency
Buffalo	1.673	2.692	US 16 east / I-90 BL east (East Hart Street) to I-25 / I-90	Northern end of US 16 / US 87 Bus. concurrency; southern end of I-90 BL concurrency
	3.314	5.333	I-90 BL ends / US 87 Bus. ends / I-90 west / US 87 north – Sheridan	I-90 exit 56A; I-25 BL / I-90 BL / US 87 Bus. northern terminus; northern end of I-90 BL / US 87 Bus. concurrency; westbound entrance and eastbound exit
1.000 mi = 1.609 km; 1.000 km = 0.621 mi: Concurrency terminus; Incomplete access
