= Wyoming Highway 310 =

State highway in Wyoming, United States

Wyoming Highway 310
- Hightower Road; 16th Street
- WYO 310 highlighted in red

Route information
- Maintained by WYDOT
- Length: 8.49 mi (13.66 km)

Major junctions
- West end: Reservoir Road at the Wheatland Reservoir
- East end: I-25 BL / US 87 Bus. / WYO 312 in Wheatland

Location
- Country: United States
- State: Wyoming
- Counties: Platte

Highway system
- Wyoming State Highway System; Interstate; US; State
← US 310	→ WYO 311

Wyoming Highway 310 (WYO 310) is an 8.49-mile-long (13.66 km) Wyoming State Road located in central Platte County.

== Route description ==
Wyoming Highway 310 begins its western end (southern at this point) at Reservoir Road on the edge of the Wheatland Reservoir #1, southwest of Wheatland. WYO 310 travels due north, named Hightower Road, for approximately 4 miles until it intersects the southern terminus of Wyoming Highway 311 (N. Hightower Road) near the CDP of Westview Circle. Here WYO 310 turns east toward Wheatland and travels now due east for almost 4 miles before reaching 16th Street, the former routing of US 87 through Wheatland, where it turns south onto 16th Street. Highway 310 travels south for a short distance of only 0.33 miles and ends at an intersection with I-25 Business/US 87 Business and the northern terminus of Wyoming Highway 312.

== History ==
The length of Highway 310 between its southern terminus and Oak Street in Wheatland was the former routing of US Route 87 prior to its relocation onto Interstate 25. Prior to this, WYO 310 used to end at the intersection of Oak Street and 16th Street (Old US 87), but was later extended south another third of a miles to its current terminus.

== Major intersections ==
The entire route is in Platte County.

Location	mi	km	Destinations	Notes
Wheatland Reservoir	0.00	0.00	Reservoir Road	Western terminus of WYO 310
Westview Circle	4.00	6.44	WYO 311	Southern terminus of WYO 311
Wheatland	8.49	13.66	I-25 BL / US 87 Bus. / WYO 312 south	Eastern terminus of WYO 311
1.000 mi = 1.609 km; 1.000 km = 0.621 mi
