= Wyoming Highway 221 =

Former state highway in Wyoming, United States

Wyoming Highway 221
- Fox Farm Road

Route information
- Maintained by WYDOT
- Length: 1.84 mi (2.96 km)

Major junctions
- West end: I-25 BL / US 85 / US 87 Bus. in Fox Farm-College.
- East end: WYO 212 in Fox Farm-College

Location
- Country: United States
- State: Wyoming
- Counties: Laramie

Highway system
- Wyoming State Highway System; Interstate; US; State
← WYO 220	→ WYO 222

Wyoming Highway 221 was a 1.84-mile (3.0 km) east–west Wyoming State Road known as Fox Farm Road located in southeastern Cheyenne.

== Route description ==
Wyoming Highway 221 traveled from I-25 Business/US 85/US 87 Business (South Greeley Highway) to Wyoming Highway 212 (College Avenue). Highway 221 paralleled Interstate 80 about one-half mile south of the Interstate and served residential and commercial areas. The route was decommissioned in 2009; all state route marker signs have been removed, and the route no longer appears on the Wyoming Official State Highway Map.

== Major intersections ==
The entire route was in Fox Farm-College, Laramie County.

mi	km	Destinations	Notes
0.00	0.00	I-25 BL / US 85 / US 87 Bus. (South Greeley Highway)	Western terminus; road continued as Fox Farm Drive
1.84	2.96	WYO 212 (College Drive)	Eastern terminus
1.000 mi = 1.609 km; 1.000 km = 0.621 mi
