= Wyoming Highway 320 =

State highway in Wyoming, United States

Wyoming Highway 320
- Old Yellowstone Highway; North Wheatland Highway; 9th Street
- WYO 320 highlighted in red

Route information
- Maintained by WYDOT
- Length: 12.33 mi (19.84 km)

Major junctions
- South end: I-25 BL / US 87 Bus. in Wheatland
- North end: US 26 in Dwyer

Location
- Country: United States
- State: Wyoming
- Counties: Platte

Highway system
- Wyoming State Highway System; Interstate; US; State
← WYO 319	→ WYO 321
← WYO 78	→ WYO 89

Wyoming Highway 320 (WYO 320) is a 12.33-mile-long (19.84 km) north–south state highway in central Platte County, Wyoming that connects Interstate 25 Business (I-25 Bus.) and U.S. Route 87 Business (US 87 Bus.) in Wheatland to US 26 in Dwyer, and was once part of the Yellowstone Highway.

== Route description ==
Wyoming Highway 320 begins its south end at I-25 Business/US 87 Business (9th Street/Swanson Road) in Wheatland. From here WYO 320 heads north, intersecting East Laramie River Road at 4.6 miles (7.4 km), which can take you west to I-25 (exit 84). Highway 320 continues north till its end at US 26 in Dwyer

== History ==
Wyoming Highway 320 was originally designated in Fremont County along what is now Wyoming Highway 789 between Lander and Shoshoni between 1939 and 1950. It was originally US 320 between 1926 and 1938 but in 1939 was recommissioned as Wyoming Highway 320. In 1940, when US 287 and Wyoming Highway 287 were rerouted, Wyoming 320 was extended southwest to Lander. WYO 320 maintained this until 1950, when US 26 was commissioned. WYO 320 lasted until 1954, when Wyoming Highway 789 was commissioned, thereby replacing it.

Additionally, The highway that currently carries Wyoming Highway 320 was originally part of US 87 and before that US 185 (US 185 between Cheyenne and Casper was decommissioned and replaced with US 87 in 1936) Between 1956 and the 1980s, as more of Interstate 25 was completed, the original routing of US 87 was recommissioned on the Interstate 25 freeway.

== Major intersections ==
The entire route is in Platte County.

Location	mi	km	Destinations	Notes
Wheatland	0.0	0.0	I-25 BL / US 87 Bus.	Southern terminus
	4.6	7.4	East Laramie River Road to I-25 / US 87	West to I-25/US 87 exit 84
	12.33	19.84	US 26	Northern terminus
1.000 mi = 1.609 km; 1.000 km = 0.621 mi
