= New Mexico State Road 250 =

State highway in New Mexico, United States

State Road 250

Route information
- Maintained by NMDOT
- Length: 4.500 mi (7.242 km)

Major junctions
- South end: I-25 BL / I-25 / US 85 near Las Vegas
- North end: Las Vegas Municipal Airport

Location
- Country: United States
- State: New Mexico
- Counties: San Miguel

Highway system
- New Mexico State Highway System; Interstate; US; State; Scenic
← NM 249	→ NM 251

State Road 250 (NM 250) is a 4.5-mile-long (7.2 km) state highway in the US state of New Mexico. NM 250's southern terminus is at Interstate 25 Business (I-25 Bus.), Interstate 25 (I-25) and U.S. Route 85 (US 85) in Las Vegas, and the northern terminus is at the Las Vegas Municipal Airport.

== Major intersections ==
The entire route is in San Miguel County.

Location	mi	km	Destinations	Notes
Las Vegas	0.000	0.000	I-25 BL south / I-25 / US 85	Southern terminus of NM 250, northern terminus of I-25 Bus.
	4.500	7.242	Las Vegas Municipal Airport	Northern terminus
1.000 mi = 1.609 km; 1.000 km = 0.621 mi
