= Wyoming Highway 255 =

State highway in Wyoming, United States

Wyoming Highway 255
- N. Center Street
- WYO 255 highlighted in red

Route information
- Maintained by WYDOT
- Length: 0.48 mi (770 m)
- Existed: c. 1985–present

Major junctions
- South end: I-25 BL / US 20 Bus. / US 26 Bus. / US 87 Bus. in Casper
- North end: I-25 / I-25 Bus. / US 20 / US 26 / US 87 / US 87 Bus. in Casper

Location
- Country: United States
- State: Wyoming
- Counties: Natrona

Highway system
- Wyoming State Highway System; Interstate; US; State
← WYO 254	→ WYO 256

Wyoming Highway 255 (WYO 255) is a short 0.48-mile-long (0.77 km) unsigned Wyoming state road in the City of Casper known as N. Center Street. This route provides a connection between US 20 Business/US 26 Business and I-25/US 20/US 26/US 87 and runs concurrent with the I-25/US 87 Business route.

== Route description ==
Wyoming Highway 255 begins its southern end at US 20 Business/US 26 Business (E 1st St./W 1st St.) in Casper and I-25 Business/US 87 Business which will join 255 from the east. Highway 255 travels north for just under a half-mile as N. Center Street for 0.48 miles (0.77 km) to an end at I-25/US 20/US 26/US 87 at Exit 188A. This route is signed as I-25 Business and US 87 Business its whole length from its southern to northern terminus. WYO 255 is also not signed from the interstate. However, I-25 Bus. and US 87 Bus. continue after Wyoming Highway 255 ends at its southern terminus by joining US 20 BUS/US 26 Bus. eastbound.

== History ==
WYO 255 follows the former alignment of WYO 220, which was moved to a western bypass of Casper in 1984.

== Major intersections ==
The entire route is in Casper, Natrona County.

mi	km	Destinations	Notes
0.00	0.00	I-25 BL north / US 20 Bus. / US 26 Bus. / US 87 Bus. north	Southern end of I-25 Bus./US 87 Bus. concurrency; southern terminus
0.48	0.77	I-25 BL south / US 87 Bus. south I-25 / US 20 / US 26 / US 87	Northern end of I-25 Bus./US 87 Bus. concurrency; northern terminus; I-25 exit 118A; I-25 west via W. F Street
1.000 mi = 1.609 km; 1.000 km = 0.621 mi: Concurrency terminus
