= New Mexico State Road 555 =

State highway in Colfax County, New Mexico, United States

State Road 555
- York Canyon Road
- NM 555 highlighted in red

Route information
- Maintained by NMDOT
- Length: 31.855 mi (51.266 km)

Major junctions
- West end: End of pavement in northwest Colfax County
- East end: US 64 / I-25 BL in Raton

Location
- Country: United States
- State: New Mexico
- Counties: Colfax

Highway system
- New Mexico State Highway System; Interstate; US; State; Scenic
← NM 554	→ NM 556

State Road 555 (NM 555) is a state highway in the U.S. state of New Mexico. NM 555's western terminus is at the end of state maintenance (the end of the paved road) 31.885 miles (51.314 km) west of Raton, and the eastern terminus is at US 64 (I-25 Bus.) in Raton.

== Major intersections ==
The entire route is in Colfax County.

Location	mi	km	Destinations	Notes
	31.855	51.266	York Canyon Road west	Continuation beyond western terminus
	31.855	51.266	West end of pavement	
Raton	0.000	0.000	US 64 (I-25 BL) to I-25	Eastern terminus
1.000 mi = 1.609 km; 1.000 km = 0.621 mi
