= New Mexico State Road 329 =

State highway in New Mexico, United States

State Road 329

Route information
- Maintained by NMDOT
- Length: 1.881 mi (3.027 km)

Major junctions
- South end: I-25 BL in Las Vegas
- North end: NM 65 / Mills Avenue in Las Vegas

Location
- Country: United States
- State: New Mexico
- Counties: San Miguel

Highway system
- New Mexico State Highway System; Interstate; US; State; Scenic
← NM 327	→ NM 330

State Road 329 (NM 329) is a 1.881-mile-long (3.027 km) state highway in the US state of New Mexico. NM 329's southern terminus is at Interstate 25 Business (I-25 Bus.) in Las Vegas, and the northern terminus is a continuation as Mills Avenue at NM 65 in Las Vegas.

== History ==
The Mills Avenue portion of NM 329, from the junction of NM 65 (Hot Springs Boulevard) eastward to the junction of I-25 Bus., was transferred to the City of Las Vegas in a road exchange agreement dated August 11, 1992.

== Major intersections ==
The entire route is in Las Vegas, San Miguel County.

mi	km	Destinations	Notes
0.000	0.000	I-25 BL	Southern terminus
1.881	3.027	NM 65 north	Northern terminus; southern terminus of NM 65
1.881	3.027	Mills Avenue To NM 518 / I-25 BL	Continuation as Mills Avenue to NM 518 and I-25 Bus.
1.000 mi = 1.609 km; 1.000 km = 0.621 mi
