= New Mexico State Road 467 =

State highway in New Mexico, United States

State Road 467

Route information
- Maintained by NMDOT
- Length: 16.765 mi (26.981 km)

Major junctions
- South end: US 70 near Portales
- North end: US 60 / US 84 near Clovis

Location
- Country: United States
- State: New Mexico
- Counties: Curry, Roosevelt

Highway system
- New Mexico State Highway System; Interstate; US; State; Scenic
← NM 466	→ NM 468

State Road 467 (NM 467) is a 16.8-mile-long (27.0 km) state highway in the US state of New Mexico. NM 467's southern terminus is at U.S. Route 70 (US 70) north of Portales, and the northern terminus is at US 60 and US 84 west of Clovis.

== Major intersections ==
County	Location	mi	km	Destinations	Notes
Roosevelt		0.000	0.000	US 70	Southern terminus
Curry		16.765	26.981	US 60 / US 84	Northern terminus
1.000 mi = 1.609 km; 1.000 km = 0.621 mi
