= Wyoming Highway 311 =

Highway in Wyoming

Wyoming Highway 311
- North Hightower Road
- WYO 311 highlighted in red

Route information
- Maintained by WYDOT
- Length: 1.99 mi (3.20 km)

Major junctions
- South end: WYO 310 in Westview Circle
- North end: CR 139 / CR 90 in Westview Circle

Location
- Country: United States
- State: Wyoming
- Counties: Platte

Highway system
- Wyoming State Highway System; Interstate; US; State
← WYO 310	→ WYO 312

Wyoming Highway 311 (WYO 311) is a 1.99-mile-long (3.20 km) north-south Wyoming State Road located in central Platte County, Wyoming that runs from Wyoming Highway 310, west of Wheatland, to Platte County Routes 139 & 90 northwest of Wheatland.

== Route description ==
Wyoming Highway 311 is a fairly short state highway located west of Wheatland in the CDP of Westview Circle. Wyoming 311 runs from WYO 310 (Hightower Road) north to an intersection with Platte County Route 139 and County Route 90 (Fletcher Park Road). Mileposts increase from south to north along WYO 311.

== Major intersections ==
The entire route is in Westview Circle, Platte County.

mi	km	Destinations	Notes
0.00	0.00	WYO 310	Southern terminus of WYO 311
1.99	3.20	CR 139 / CR 90	Northern terminus of WYO 311
1.000 mi = 1.609 km; 1.000 km = 0.621 mi
