= CSHS =

CSHS may stand for:

- Caboolture State High School
- Cactus Shadows High School
- Cairns State High School
- Caloundra State High School, in Caloundra, Sunshine Coast Region, Queensland, Australia
- Captain Shreve High School
- Cardinal Spellman High School (New York City)
- Carine Senior High School
- Carl Sandburg High School
- Cheyenne South High School
- Churchlands Senior High School
- Clear Springs High School
- Coburg Senior High School
- College Station High School
- Coral Springs High School
- Corinda State High School
- Crawfordsville Senior High School
