= Wyoming Highway 321 =

State highway in Wyoming, United States

Wyoming Highway 321
- Interstate 25 Business
- WYO 321 highlighted in red

Route information
- Maintained by WYDOT
- Length: 3.34 mi (5.38 km)

Major junctions
- South end: I-25 / US 87 / WYO 211 in Chugwater
- WYO 313 in Chugwater
- North end: I-25 / US 87 north of Chugwater

Location
- Country: United States
- State: Wyoming
- Counties: Platte

Highway system
- Wyoming State Highway System; Interstate; US; State
← WYO 320	→ WYO 322

Wyoming Highway 321 (WYO 321) is a 3.34-mile-long (5.38 km) north–south Wyoming State Road that is partially known as TY Basin Road and 1st Street and was once part of the Old Yellowstone Highway. WYO 321 travels from the junction with I-25/US 87/WYO 211, meets Wyoming Highway 313, and heads north to I-25/US 87 at exit 57 just north of Chugwater (Ty Basin Interchange). Wyoming Highway 321 was originally U.S. Highway 87, and its interchanges with I-25 are signed as I-25 Business.

== Route description ==
WYO 321 begins at a diamond interchange with concurrent highways I-25 and US 87 on the south side of Chugwater. The highway passes the Chugwater rest area and turns north at TY Basin Road, After passing its junction with WYO 313, it heads out of town, paralleling I-25 until its northern terminus at exit 57.

== Major intersections ==
The entire route is in Platte County.

Location	mi	km	Destinations	Notes
Chugwater	0.000	0.000	I-25 / US 87 / WYO 211 south – Cheyenne, Wheatland	Southern terminus of WYO 321; northern terminus of WYO 211; I-25 exit 54
Chugwater	0.59	0.95	WYO 313 east (Lone Tree Road)	Western terminus of WYO 313
	3.34	5.38	I-25 / US 87 / TY Basin Road north	Northern terminus; I-25 exit 57; road continues as TY Basin Road.
1.000 mi = 1.609 km; 1.000 km = 0.621 mi: Route transition
