= Interstate 180 (Wyoming) =

Interstate Highway in Cheyenne, Wyoming, United States

Interstate 180
- I-180 highlighted in red

Route information
- Auxiliary route of I-80
- Maintained by WYDOT
- Length: 1.12 mi (1.80 km)
- Existed: 1984–present
- NHS: Entire route

Major junctions
- South end: I-80 / I-25 BL / US 85 / US 87 Bus. in Cheyenne
- North end: I-80 BL / US 30 / I-25 BL / US 85 / US 87 Bus. in Cheyenne

Location
- Country: United States
- State: Wyoming
- Counties: Laramie

Highway system
- Interstate Highway System; Main; Auxiliary; Suffixed; Business; Future; Wyoming State Highway System; Interstate; US; State
← WYO 175	→ US 185

Interstate 180 (I-180) is a 1.12-mile-long (1.80 km) expressway in the US state of Wyoming between I-80 and downtown Cheyenne.

It is unusual for being one of the few Interstate Highways that does not conform to Interstate Highway standards. There is also no control of access anywhere along its route. Other routes in Alaska and Puerto Rico are similar in nature, as they are funded by Interstate dollars but do not conform to Interstate Highway standards. The only grade separations are a diamond interchange at its southern end (at a junction with I-80) and a pair of bridges that run over 1st Street and the Union Pacific Railroad tracks. However, even the interchange with I-80 is a standard diamond with signalized intersections. There are five traffic signals along I-180.

I-180 is cosigned with I-25 Business Loop (I-25 BL), US Highway 85 (US 85), and US 87 Business (US 87 Bus.), making it the only concurrency of an Interstate, Interstate business route, US Highway, and US Highway business route. It is also the only auxiliary Interstate Highway in Wyoming.

== Route description ==
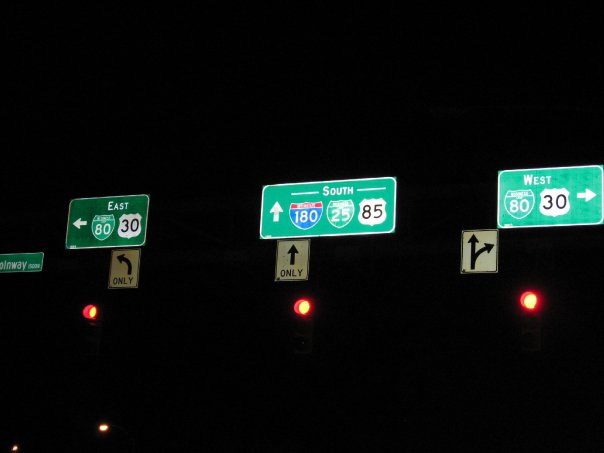
I-180/I-25 BL/US 85 (south) at its northern terminus at I-80 BL/US 30 (Lincolnway) in Cheyenne

I-180 begins at a diamond interchange with I-80 in Cheyenne, heading north concurrently with I-25 BL/US 85/US 87 Bus. on the four-lane divided North Greeley Highway. South of this interchange, I-25 BL/US 85/US 87 Bus. continues along North Greeley Highway. From the southern terminus, I-180 passes over Deming Drive and passes local homes and businesses. The road curves northwesterly and intersects 5th Street at a traffic light. The highway passes under a pedestrian bridge at 7th Street before crossing 9th Street at a signalized intersection. Past 9th Street, the directions of I-180 split and pass over a large Union Pacific Railroad yard. After this bridge, I-180 reaches its northern terminus at an at-grade signalized intersection with I-80 BL/US 30. Past this intersection, I-25 BL/US 85/US 87 Bus. continues north on the one-way pairing of Warren Avenue northbound and Central Avenue southbound.

== History ==
I-180 was conceived in November 1967, when Wyoming requested it for a new spur route into Cheyenne. The American Association of State Highway Officials added it to the Interstate Highway System in June 1970. The original plan was to have a freeway along the same corridor, with a full freeway-to-freeway interchange at I-80, but the Federal Highway Administration (FHWA) rejected it in December 1970 due to high cost and access issues. Wyoming revised the proposal to the current configuration in February 1971, and it was approved by the FHWA that March. I-180 opened in June 1984, after six years of expressway upgrades.

== Major intersections ==
The entire route is in Cheyenne, Laramie County.

mi	km	Destinations	Notes
0.00	0.00	US 85 south (I-25 BL / US 87 Bus. south) – Greeley	Continuation beyond I-80; southern end of I-25 BL/US 85/US 87 Bus. concurrency
0.00	0.00	I-80 – Rock Springs, Sidney	Signalized interchange; southern terminus; I-80 exit 362
0.34	0.55	5th Street	Signalized at-grade intersection
0.61	0.98	9th Street	Signalized at-grade intersection
1.09	1.75	I-80 BL / US 30 (Lincolnway)	Signalized at-grade intersections; northern terminus
1.09	1.75	I-25 BL / US 85 / US 87 Bus. north (Warren Avenue)	One-way street; outbound access only; continuation beyond US 30; northern end of I-25 BL/US 85/US 87 Bus. concurrency
1.09	1.75	I-25 BL / US 85 / US 87 Bus. (Central Avenue)	One-way street; inbound access only; northern end of I-25 BL./US 85/US 87 Bus. concurrency
1.000 mi = 1.609 km; 1.000 km = 0.621 mi: Concurrency terminus
