= New Mexico State Road 468 =

State highway in New Mexico, United States

State Road 468
- NM 468 highlighted in red

Route information
- Maintained by NMDOT
- Length: 2.51 mi (4.04 km)

Major junctions
- West end: End of state maintenance near Springer
- East end: I-25 BL in Springer

Location
- Country: United States
- State: New Mexico
- Counties: Colfax

Highway system
- New Mexico State Highway System; Interstate; US; State; Scenic
← NM 467	→ NM 469

State Road 468 (NM 468) is a 2.51-mile-long (4.04 km) state highway in the US state of New Mexico. NM 468's western terminus is at the end of state maintenance by the entrance to New Mexico Boys School northwest of Springer, and the eastern terminus is at Interstate 25 Business (I-25 Bus.) in Springer.

== Major intersections ==
The entire route is in Colfax County.

Location	mi	km	Destinations	Notes
Springer	0.000	0.000	I-25 BL	Eastern terminus
	2.510	4.039	End of state maintenance	Western terminus, continues west
1.000 mi = 1.609 km; 1.000 km = 0.621 mi
