= Wyoming Highway 312 =

State highway in Wyoming, United States

Wyoming Highway 312
- Preuit Road; South Street
- WYO 312 highlighted in red

Route information
- Maintained by WYDOT
- Length: 7.30 mi (11.75 km)

Major junctions
- South end: WYO 34 SSE of Wheatland
- North end: I-25 BL / US 87 Bus. / WYO 310 in Wheatland

Location
- Country: United States
- State: Wyoming
- Counties: Platte

Highway system
- Wyoming State Highway System; Interstate; US; State
← WYO 311	→ WYO 313
← WYO 33	→ WYO 35

Wyoming Highway 312 (WYO 312) is a 7.30-mile-long (11.75 km) north–south Wyoming State Road located in central Platte County, Wyoming that runs from Wyoming Highway 34 to I-25 BUS/US 87 BUS in Wheatland.

== Route description ==
Wyoming Highway 312 begins at its south end at Wyoming Highway 34, south-southwest of Wheatland, and travels north towards Wheatland. At about 6.2 miles (10.0 km), WYO 312 enters the city limits of Wheatland, and is named South Street, as the route turns east to head to an end at I-25 BUS/US 87 BUS and the eastern terminus of Wyoming Highway 310.

== History ==
Wyoming Highway 312 is the original path that Wyoming Highway 34 used to take into Wheatland before it was realigned to go directly to the Interstate 25.

== Major intersections ==
The entire route is in Platte County.

Location	mi	km	Destinations	Notes
	0.00	0.00	WYO 34	
Wheatland	7.30	11.75	I-25 BL / US 87 Bus. / WYO 310 north	Eastern terminus of WYO 310
1.000 mi = 1.609 km; 1.000 km = 0.621 mi
