= Business routes of Interstate 80 =

Interstate 80 Business

Location
- Country: United States

Highway system
- Interstate Highway System; Main; Auxiliary; Suffixed; Business; Future

Interstate 80 Business may refer to several business routes of the Interstate Highway System that connects Interstate 80 with the central business district of various cities bypassed by I-80. The business route in each community is considered a unique route. In many cases, these routes are a former section of a U.S. Route or state highway.

== California ==
Interstate business routes in California are assigned by the California Department of Transportation (Caltrans) but are not maintained by Caltrans unless they overlay other routes of the state highway system. Local authorities may request route assignment from the Caltrans Transportation System Information Program, and all requests require approval of the executive committee of the American Association of State Highway and Transportation Officials (AASHTO).

=== Sacramento ===
Interstate 80 Business
- Location: Sacramento
- Existed: 1981–present

Interstate 80 Business (I-80 Bus.), called the Capital City Freeway in its entirety, is a business loop of I-80 through Sacramento. Unlike most business routes in California, it is state-maintained and assigned route numbers in the state highway system—part of US Route 50 (US 50) on its western half (5.64 miles [9.08 km]) and unsigned State Route 51 (SR 51) on its eastern half (8.86 miles [14.26 km]). The full road is a freeway and carried I-80 until 1981, when the signage and designation of I-80 was transferred to the Beltline Freeway, previously signed as I-880. At that time, AASHTO assigned the I-305 designation to the west half, which met Interstate Highway standards. However, Caltrans has never signed this number, put it on any road signs, or used it internally. (Note: The Federal Highway Administration (FHWA) lists unsigned I-305 as six miles (9.7 km), increased from 5.3 miles (8.5 km) in 1999.)

=== Truckee ===
Interstate 80 Business
- Location: Truckee
- Existed: 2000s

Interstate 80 Business (I-80 Bus.) was a business loop in Truckee. It served as a loop around Truckee near I-80 and traversed through Donner Pass Road. All signs and references to the business loop were removed between 2003 and 2004 as part of the reconstruction of I-80 through the area.

== Nevada and Utah ==
=== Verdi ===
Interstate 80 Business
- Location: Verdi
- Existed: June 28, 1982–present

=== Reno–Sparks ===
Interstate 80 Business
- Location: Reno–Sparks
- Existed: June 28, 1982–present

=== Wadsworth–Fernley ===
Interstate 80 Business
- Location: Wadsworth–Fernley
- Existed: June 28, 1982–present

=== Lovelock ===
Interstate 80 Business
- Location: Lovelock
- Existed: April 7, 2000–present

=== Winnemucca ===
Interstate 80 Business
- Location: Winnemucca
- Existed: June 28, 1982–present

=== Battle Mountain ===
Interstate 80 Business
- Location: Battle Mountain
- Existed: June 28, 1982–present

=== Elko ===
Interstate 80 Business
- Location: Elko
- Existed: June 28, 1982–present

=== Wells ===
Interstate 80 Business
- Location: Wells
- Existed: June 28, 1982–present

=== West Wendover, Nevada–Wendover, Utah ===
Interstate 80 Business
- Location: West Wendover, Nevada–Wendover, Utah
- Length: 2.2605 mi (3.6379 km)

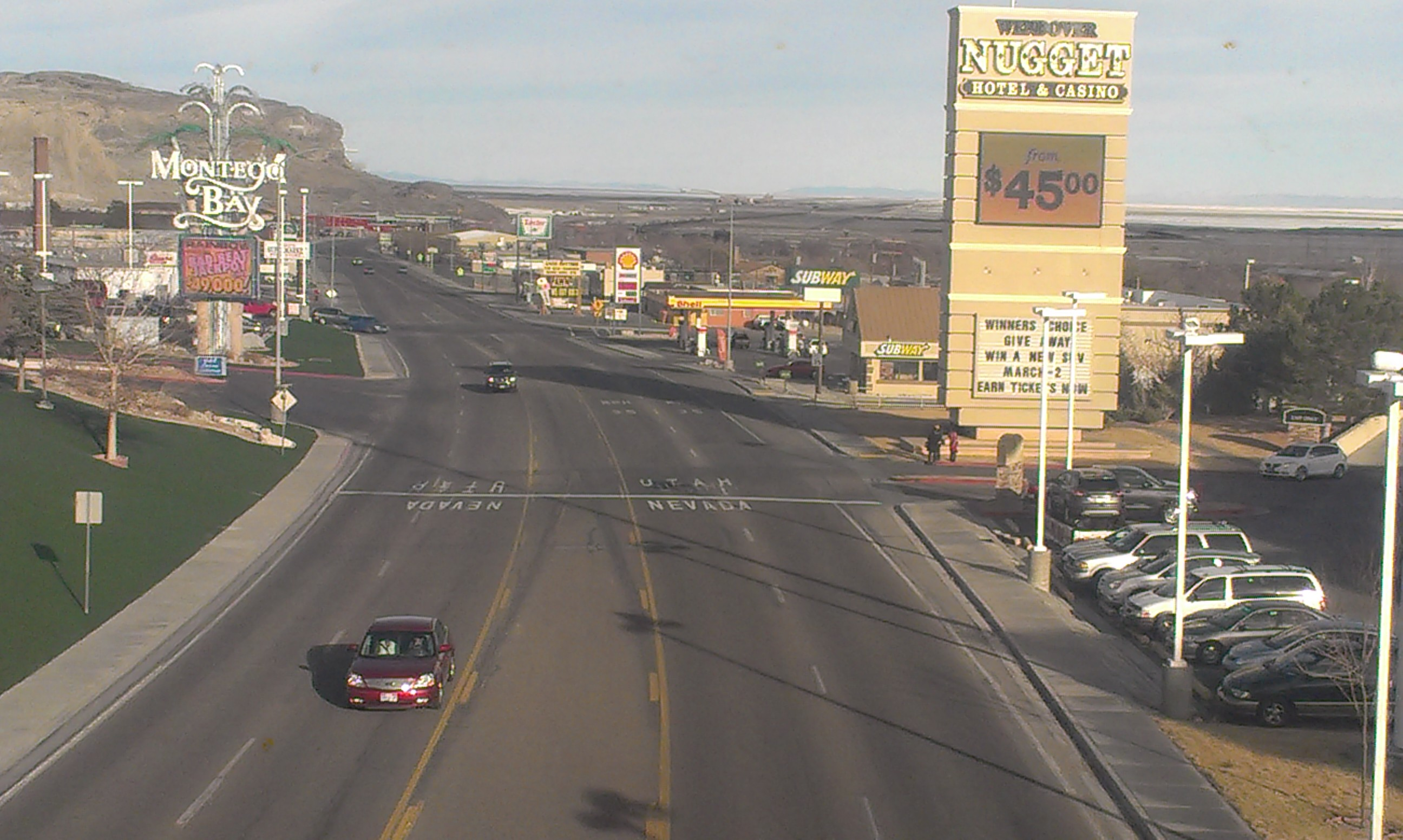
East at I-80 Bus. (Wendover Boulevard) on the Nevada–Utah state line, February 2014

Interstate 80 Business (I-80 Bus.) is a 2.2605-mile (3.6379 km) unofficial business route of I-80 in West Wendover, Nevada, and Wendover, Utah, that is southern loop off of I-80 and runs mostly along Wendover Boulevard. Wendover Boulevard was part of the original US Route 40 (US 40). The western part of the Nevada segment runs concurrently with US 93 Alternate, and the entire segment in Utah is concurrent and coterminous with State Route 58. The Nevada Department of Transportation applied for the business loop designation in the early 1980s, but the designation has never been approved because the Utah Department of Transportation never submitted a similar request. Despite being unofficial, the business loop is signed as such, even in Utah. Between July 1976 and 1993, I-80 Bus. segment in Nevada was entirely concurrent with the former State Route 224.

== Wyoming ==
=== Evanston ===
Interstate 80 Business
- Location: Evanston
- Length: 3.363 mi (5.412 km)

U.S. Highway 189 Business
- Location: Evanston
- Length: 3.363 mi (5.412 km)

Interstate 80 Business Loop (I-80 BL) is a business loop of I-80 that runs 3.15 miles (5.07 km) through Evanston in western Uinta County. The business route is coexistent with U.S. Route 189 Business (US 189 Bus.) for its entire length. I-80 BL begins at I-80 exit 3; the ramp from westbound I-80 to the business route lies east of the other three ramps of the diamond interchange. The business routes heads east along Harrison Drive, which veers northeast onto 11th Street at the western edge of the city street grid. In the downtown area, I-80 BL turns southeast onto Front Street. At the intersection of Front Street and 6th Street, which is the northern terminus of Wyoming Highway 150 (WYO 150) and the southern terminus of WYO 89, the business route turns north and crosses the Union Pacific Railroad's Evanston Subdivision rail line. I-80 BL crosses the Bear River, then turns east onto Bear River Drive (Lincoln Highway) while WYO 89 continues north. The business route follows Bear River Drive east, then meets I-80 again at exit 6, before terminating at the Bear River State Park rest area south of the Interstate.

Major intersections

The entire route is in Evanston, Uinta County.

mi	km	Destinations	Notes
0.000	0.000	I-80 / US 189 – Salt Lake, Rock Springs	I-80 exit 3; I-80 BL western terminus; US 189 Bus. southern terminus; continues south as Overthrust Road
0.000	0.000	Wasatch Road	Serves Evanston-Uinta County Airport
1.661	2.673	WYO 89 south (Front Street east) to I-80 / WYO 150 – Rock Springs	Western end WYO 89 concurrency
2.111	3.397	WYO 89 north – Jackson	Eastern end of WYO 89 concurrency
3.196	5.143	I-80 / US 189 – Rock Springs, Salt Lake	I-80 exit 6
3.363	5.412	State of Wyoming Visitor Center	I-80 BL eastern terminus; US 189 Bus. northern terminus
1.000 mi = 1.609 km; 1.000 km = 0.621 mi: Concurrency terminus

=== Fort Bridger–Lyman ===
Interstate 80 Business
- Location: Fort Bridger–Lyman
- Length: 16.67 mi (26.83 km)

Interstate 80 Business (I-80 BL) is a business loop of I-80 that has a length of 15.63 miles (25.15 km) through Fort Bridger and Lyman in eastern Uinta County. The business route begins at I-80 exit 34 where it heads east across Blacks Fork of the Green River and passes through the unincorporated town of Fort Bridger, which contains the namesake historic fort. I-80 BL intersects WYO 414 in the hamlet of Urie then curves north onto the town of Lyman. The business route follows Main Street, then intersects the southern end of WYO 413 within a sharp curve east onto Clark Street. I-80 BL leaves the town and curves northeast, then crosses Smiths Fork, a tributary of Blacks Fork, before rejoining I-80 at exit 48.

=== Green River ===
Interstate 80 Business
- Location: Green River
- Length: 2.513 mi (4.044 km)

U.S. Highway 30 Business
- Location: Green River
- Length: 2.513 mi (4.044 km)

Interstate 80 Business (I-80 BL) is a business loop of I-80 within Green River that spans 2.51 miles (4.04 km) through Green River in western Sweetwater County. The business route is coexistent with U.S. Route 30 Business (US 30 Bus.) for its entire length and avoids the Green River Tunnel on I-80. I-80 BL begins at exit 89, a trumpet interchange that connects with the eastern terminus of WYO 374. The highway heads southeast parallel to the Green River along Flaming Gorge Way through the center of Green River. Near the east end of the city, I-80 BL parallels a Union Pacific Railroad railyard that serves as the western end of the railroad's Rawlins Subdivision and the eastern end of the Evanston Subdivision. Next to the railyard, the business route has an intersection with WYO 530 (Uinta Drive), which heads north, then curves back south and bridges the business route and the railyard on its way to the portion of the city south of the Green River. Immediately east of WYO 530, I-80 BL rejoins the mainline Interstate at exit 91, another trumpet interchange.

Major intersections

The entire route is in Green River, Sweetwater County.

mi	km	Destinations	Notes
0.000	0.000	I-80 / US 30 – Evanston, Rock Springs	I-80 exit 89; I-80 BL / US 30 Bus. western terminus
0.243	0.391	WYO 374 west (Service Road) – James Town	
1.770	2.849	WYO 530 south – Flaming Gorge National Recreation Area	
2.513	4.044	I-80 / US 30 – Evanston, Rock Springs	I-80 exit 91; I-80 BL / US 30 Bus. eastern terminus
1.000 mi = 1.609 km; 1.000 km = 0.621 mi

=== Rock Springs ===
Interstate 80 Business
- Location: Rock Springs
- Length: 4.084 mi (6.573 km)

U.S. Highway 30 Business
- Location: Rock Springs
- Length: 4.084 mi (6.573 km)

Interstate 80 Business (I-80 BL) is a business loop of I-80 that runs 4.12 miles (6.63 km) through Rock Springs in central Sweetwater County. The business route is coexistent with U.S. Route 30 Business (US 30 Bus.) for its entire length. I-80 BL begins at exit 102 and heads east along Dewar Drive. The highway curves northeast and passes to the north of downtown Rock Springs. Downtown is served by WYO 430, which I-80 BL intersects just east of a rail line that branches north from the Union Pacific Railroad's Rawlins Subdivision. The business route follows Center Street west of WYO 430 and Bridger Avenue to the east, then follows Pilot Butte Avenue through the eastern part of the city to its eastern junction with I-80 at exit 107.

Major intersections

The entire route is in Rock Springs, Sweetwater County.

mi	km	Destinations	Notes
0.000	0.000	I-80 / US 30 / US 191 – Green River, Rawlins	I-80 exit 102; I-80 BL / US 30 Bus. western terminus
1.227	1.975	WYO 376 east to WYO 430	WYO 376 western terminus
2.451	3.945	Elk Street (US 191 Spur north) to I-80 / US 191 north – Pinedale	
3.690	5.938	WYO 376 west to WYO 430	WYO 376 eastern terminus
4.084	6.573	I-80 / US 30 – Green River, Rawlins	I-80 exit 107; I-80 BL / US 30 Bus. eastern terminus
1.000 mi = 1.609 km; 1.000 km = 0.621 mi

=== Rawlins ===
Interstate 80 Business
- Location: Carbon County
- Length: 3.888 mi (6.257 km)

U.S. Highway 30 Business
- Location: Carbon County
- Length: 3.888 mi (6.257 km)

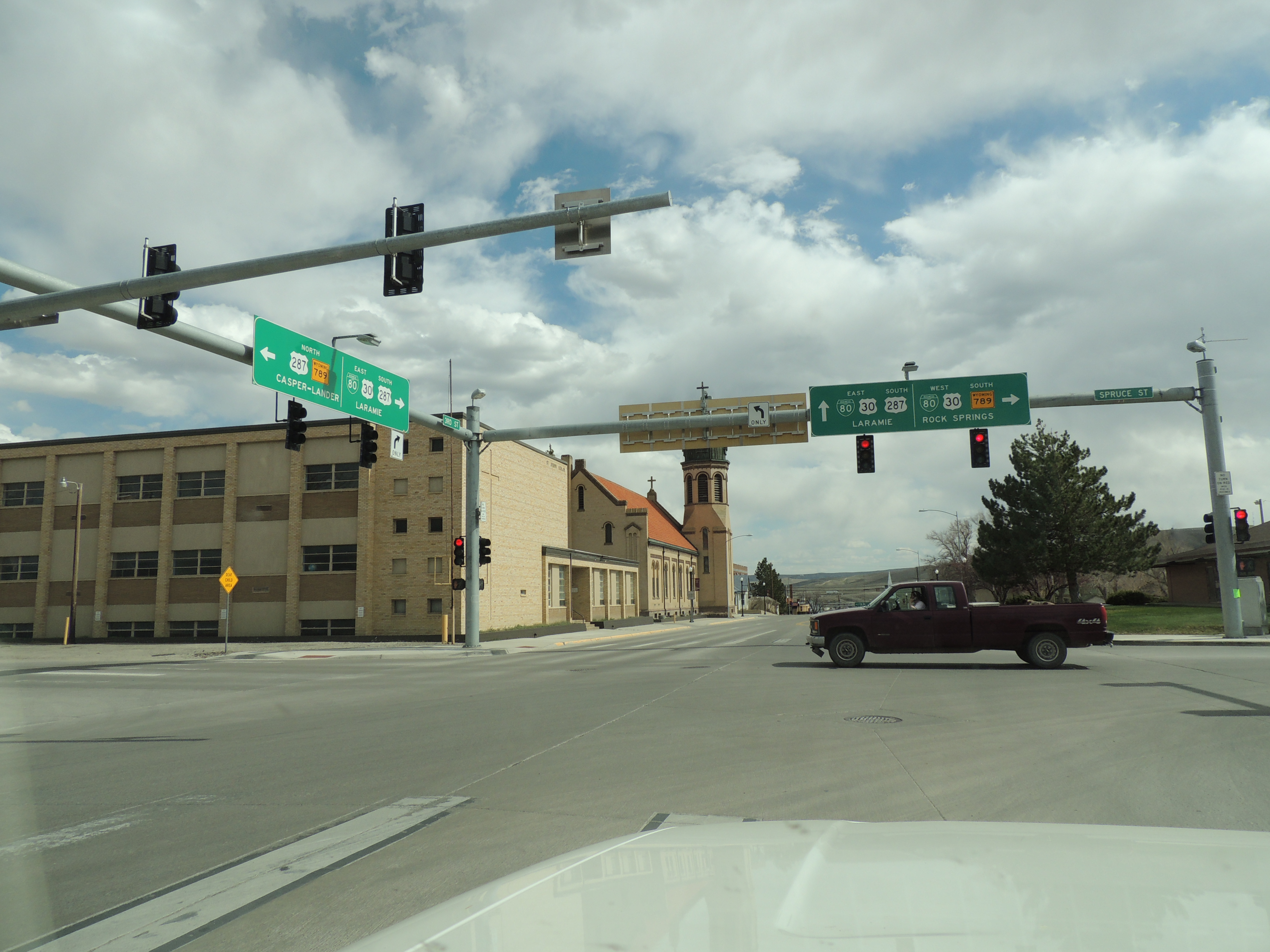
I‑90 BL US 30 Bus. at the intersection of West Spruce and 3rd streets in Rawlins, May 2014

Interstate 80 Business (I-80 BL) is a 3.77-mile (6.07 km) business loop of I-80 that passes though Rawlins in western Carbon County. The business route is coexistent with U.S. Route 30 Business (US 30 Bus.) for its entire length, same as the business routes in Green River and Rock Springs.

Description

I-80 BL / US 30 Bus. begins at a diamond interchange on I-80 / US 30 (exit 211) immediately west of the city. From its western terminus it heads east concurrently with WYO 789 along West Spruce Street. In downtown Rawlins, at the intersection of Spruce Street and 3rd Street, the business routes turn south onto 3rd Street, WY 789 turns north onto 3rd Street (also U.S. Route 287 [US 287]), and the business routes begin to run concurrently with US 287.

Three blocks to the south, I-80 BL / US 30 Bus. / US 287 turns east onto Cedar Street and parallels the Union Pacific Railroad along its Rawlins railyard, which serves as the boundary between the Rawlins Subdivision to the west and the Laramie Subdivision to the east. The highway meets the southern end of US 287 Bypass (US 287 Byp; Higley Boulevard) shortly before reaching its eastern terminus at I-80 / US 30 / US 287 (exit 215). Within the trumpet interchange on the south side of I-80 / US 20, the interchange ramps meet the western end of Wyoming Highway 76, which heads east toward Sinclair.

Major intersections

The entire route is in Carbon County.

Location	mi	km	Destinations	Notes
	0.000	0.000	South Wagon Circle Rd west	Continuation west beyond western terminus
	0.000	0.000	I-80 east / US 30 east – I‑80 BL / US 30 Bus. I-80 west / US 30 west / WYO 789 south – Wamsutter, Rock Springs	Western terminus; diamond interchange; I‑80 exit 211; western end of US 30 Bus. / WYO 789 concurrency
Rawlins	1.637	2.634	US 287 north / WYO 789 north (3rd St) – Casper, Lander; West Spruce St east	Eastern end of WYO 789 concurrency; western end of US 287 concurrency
Rawlins	3.120	5.021	US 287 Byp. north (Hingley Blvd) – US 287, Casper, Lander	T intersection; southern end of US 287 Byp.
	3.888	6.257	WYO 76 east – Sinclair	Eastbound exit and westbound entrance
	3.888	6.257	I-80 east / US 30 east / US 287 south – Sinclair, Laramie I-80 west / US 30 west – I‑80 BL / US 30 Bus.	Eastern terminus; trumpet interchange; I-80 exit 215; eastern end of US 287 / US 30 Bus. concurrency
1.000 mi = 1.609 km; 1.000 km = 0.621 mi: Concurrency terminus; Incomplete access

=== Laramie ===
Interstate 80 Business
- Location: Laramie
- Length: 6.363 mi (10.240 km)

Interstate 80 Business (I-80 Bus.), also known as Lincoln Highway, is a business loop of I-80 that spans 6.357 miles (10.231 km) through Laramie in southern Albany County. I-80 BL begins at I-80 exit 310 and heads east along Curtis Street, which crosses over the Laramie River and the Union Pacific Railroad's Laramie Subdivision. The business route turns south onto 3rd Street, along which the highway runs concurrently with US 30 and US 287. In downtown Laramie, I-80 BL and US 30 turn east onto Grand Avenue, which runs along the southern edge of the University of Wyoming campus. The highway curves southeast and leaves the city of Laramie just north of its end at the trumpet interchange of I-80 exit 316.

Major intersections

The entire route is in Laramie, Albany County.

mi	km	Destinations	Notes
0.000	0.000	I-80 – Rawlins, Cheyenne	I-80 exit 310; I-80 BL western terminus
1.255	2.020	US 30 west / US 287 north (3rd Street) / Reynold Street – Casper, Lander	Western end of US 30 / US 287 concurrency
2.101	3.381	WYO 130 west / WYO 230 west (Snowy Range Road) / Harney Street – Centennial	
2.364	3.804	US 287 south (3rd Street) / Grand Avenue	Eastern end of US 287 concurrency
6.363	10.240	I-80 / US 30 east – Rawlins, Cheyenne	I-80 exit 316; I-80 BL eastern terminus; eastern end of US 30 concurrency
1.000 mi = 1.609 km; 1.000 km = 0.621 mi: Concurrency terminus

=== Cheyenne ===
Interstate 80 Business
- Location: Cheyenne
- Length: 6.988 mi (11.246 km)

Interstate 80 Business (I-80 Bus.) is a business loop of I-80 that runs 6.935 miles (11.161 km) through Cheyenne in central Laramie County. I-80 BL begins at I-80 exit 358, a three-ramp partial cloverleaf interchange next to the Union Pacific Railroad's Laramie Subdivision rail line at the western city limits of Cheyenne. WYO 225 (Otto Road) heads southwest from the interchange and I-80 BL and US 30 head east along Lincolnway. The interchange has no ramp to eastbound I-80; that movement is made via the business route's four-ramp partial cloverleaf interchange with I-25 and US 87 a short distance to the east. I-80 BL and US 30 intersect Missile Drive, cross Crow Creek, and have an at-grade crossing of a BNSF Railway line before entering downtown Cheyenne. In the center of downtown, north of the Cheyenne railyard and the Cheyenne Depot Museum, the highways intersect US 85, I-25 Bus, and the northern end of I-180. Those north–south highways use Central Avenue southbound and Warren Avenue northbound. I-80 BL and US 30 leave downtown Cheyenne and the vicinity of the railroad as they pass Holiday Park. On the east side of Cheyenne at Lincolnway's intersection with WYO 212 (College Drive), US 30 continues east and I-80 BL turns south onto WYO 212. The business route and state highway cross over Union Pacific Railroad's Sidney Subdivision on the way to the eastern terminus of I-80 BL at I-80 exit 364 across from the Laramie County Fairgrounds.

Major intersections

The entire route is in Cheyenne, Laramie County.

mi	km	Destinations	Notes
0.000	0.000	I-80 / US 30 west – Laramie, Cheyenne Otto Road (WYO 225 west)	I-80 exit 358; I-80 BL western terminus; western end of US 30 concurrency; no entrance to I-80 east; WYO 225 (Otto Road) is former US 30 west
0.618	0.995	I-25 / US 87 to I-80 east – Fort Collins, Wheatland, Casper	I-25 exit 9
2.800– 2.865	4.506– 4.611	I-180 south / I-25 BL / US 85 (Central Avenue / Warren Avenue)	One-way couplet; I-180 northern terminus
5.735	9.230	US 30 east (Lincolnway) WYO 212 north (College Drive)	Eastern end of US 30 concurrency; western end of WYO 212 concurrency
6.988	11.246	I-80 west – Cheyenne WYO 212 south (College Drive) – Laramie County Community College	I-80 exit 358; I-80 BL eastern terminus; eastern end of WYO 212 concurrency
1.000 mi = 1.609 km; 1.000 km = 0.621 mi: Concurrency terminus; Incomplete access

=== Pine Bluffs ===
Interstate 80 Business
- Location: Pine Bluffs

Interstate 80 Business (I-80 Bus.) is a business loop in the US state of Wyoming. It serves as a loop through Pine Bluffs, near I-80 and traverses approximately 1.5 miles (2.4 km). Concurrent highway routing in the Pine Bluffs area is along US 30 (including Parsons Street). Previous concurrent routing included US 30 and State Link 53B (L-53B) in Nebraska. All signs and references to the business loop in Nebraska were completely removed in 2009, due to a decommissioning of all such related Interstate routes statewide. Business route shields were removed on the Wyoming side around the same time, but were reinstalled in places along the route in Pine Bluffs in 2012.

State	County	Location	mi	km	Destinations	Notes
Nebraska	Kimball		0.00	0.00	I-80 – Sidney, Cheyenne	Former I-80 BL eastern terminus; present-day L-53B southern terminus; I-80 exit 1
Nebraska	Kimball		0.41	0.66	US 30 east	Former east end of US 30 overlap; present-day L-53B northern terminus
Nebraska–Wyoming state line			0.81 0.000	1.30 0.000		I-80 BL eastern terminus; east end of US 30 overlap
Wyoming	Laramie	Pine Bluffs	1.495	2.406	WYO 215 north – Albin	
Wyoming	Laramie	Pine Bluffs	1.557	2.506	I-80 / US 30 west – Sidney, Cheyenne	I-80 BL western terminus; west end of US 30 overlap; I-80 exit 401
1.000 mi = 1.609 km; 1.000 km = 0.621 mi: Closed/former; Concurrency terminus

== Nebraska ==
=== Sidney ===
Interstate 80 Business
- Location: Sidney
- Existed: 2009

Interstate 80 Business (I-80 Bus.) was a business loop in the US state of Nebraska. It served as a loop through Sidney, near I-80 and traversed approximately nine miles (14 km) over multiple highways. Concurrent highways included Nebraska Highway 19 (N-19), US 30 (Illinois Street) and L-17J. All signs and references to the business loop were removed in 2009 due to a decommissioning of all such related Interstate routes statewide.

=== Lincoln ===
Interstate 80 Business
- Location: Lincoln
- Existed: unknown

Interstate 80 Business (I-80 Bus.) was a business loop in the US state of Nebraska. It served as a services loop through Lincoln for Interstate travelers, as the Interstate was outside of the city at the time. The route traversed the range of 11 to 14 miles (18 to 23 km), over various city streets and several highways. The business route entered the city from the west at I-80, overlapping with US 6 (West "O" Street), was aligned with several downtown one-way streets, went past the University of Nebraska City/East Campuses, and exited the city to the northeast, back to the Interstate, along the US 6 (Cornhusker Highway)/US 77 corridors (generally following the old Detroit–Lincoln–Denver Highway route throughout the city). The route was established in 1962 and was decommissioned at an unknown later date.
