= New Mexico State Road 300 =

State highway in New Mexico, United States

State Road 300

Route information
- Maintained by NMDOT
- Length: 6.605 mi (10.630 km)

Major junctions
- South end: I-25 / US 84 / US 85 / US 285 near Santa Fe
- North end: NM 466 in Santa Fe

Location
- Country: United States
- State: New Mexico
- Counties: Santa Fe

Highway system
- New Mexico State Highway System; Interstate; US; State; Scenic
← NM 297	→ NM 301

State Road 300 (NM 300) is a 6.605-mile-long (10.630 km) state highway in the US state of New Mexico. NM 300's southern terminus is at Interstate 25 (I-25), U.S. Route 84 (US 84), US 85 and US 285 south of Santa Fe, and the northern terminus is at NM 466 in Santa Fe.

== Major intersections ==
The entire route is in Santa Fe County.

Location	mi	km	Destinations	Notes
Santa Fe	0.000	0.000	NM 466	Northern terminus, continues west as Rodeo Road
			CR 67C (Two Trails Road) / Santa Fe Trail Scenic Byway	
	6.362	10.239	FR 2108 (Old Las Vegas Highway) / Santa Fe Trail Scenic Byway	Western terminus of FR 2108
	6.605	10.630	I-25 (US 85) / US 84 / US 285	Southern terminus, I-25 exit 290
1.000 mi = 1.609 km; 1.000 km = 0.621 mi
