= Granite, Wyoming =

- Unincorporated community
- Location within the state of Wyoming Granite (the United States)
- Coordinates: 41°06′00″N 105°09′30″W
- Country: United States
- State: Wyoming
- County: Laramie
- Elevation: 7,336 ft (2,236 m)
- Time zone: UTC-7 (Mountain (MST))
  - Summer (DST): UTC-6 (MDT)
- ZIP codes: 82059
- GNIS feature ID: 1597336

Granite (also Granite Canon or Granite Canyon) is an unincorporated community in Laramie County, Wyoming, United States. Its elevation is 7,336 feet (2,236 m) above sea level. The community is unincorporated, but has the postal designation of Granite Canon with the ZIP code of 82059.

Public education in the community of Granite is provided by Laramie County School District #1.

On the morning of October 4, 2018, an eastbound Union Pacific freight train collided with the rear of a stationary Union Pacific freight train in Granite Canyon. At the time of the accident, the striking train was traveling on a descending grade leading up to the point of collision. The engineer and conductor of the striking train were killed, and three locomotives and 57 cars of the striking train derailed, while nine cars of the stationary train derailed.
