= New Mexico State Road 65 =

State highway in New Mexico, United States

State Road 65
- NM 65 highlighted in red

Route information
- Maintained by NMDOT
- Length: 15.505 mi (24.953 km)

Major junctions
- South end: NM 329 in Las Vegas
- North end: CR 263

Location
- Country: United States
- State: New Mexico
- Counties: San Miguel

Highway system
- New Mexico State Highway System; Interstate; US; State; Scenic
← US 64	→ US 66

State Road 65 (NM 65) is a state highway in the US state of New Mexico. Its total length is approximately 15.5 miles (24.9 km). NM 65's northern terminus is a continuation as County Road 263 (CR 263) at the intersection of Forest 156 Road. It passes through Montezuma, and its southern terminus is at NM 329 in Las Vegas.

== Major intersections ==
The entire route is in San Miguel County.

Location	mi	km	Destinations	Notes
Las Vegas	0.000	0.000	NM 329 south	Southern terminus; northern terminus of NM 329
Las Vegas	1.447	2.329	NM 144 west	Eastern terminus of NM 144
	15.505	24.953	CR 263	Northern terminus
1.000 mi = 1.609 km; 1.000 km = 0.621 mi
