= Laramie County School District Number 1 =

Public school district in Laramie County, Wyoming

Laramie County School District #1 is a public school district based in Cheyenne, Wyoming, United States. With an enrollment of 14,000 students as of 2024, it is the largest school district in the state of Wyoming.

== Geography ==
Laramie County School District #1 serves the western portion of Laramie County, including the following communities:

- Incorporated places
  - City of Cheyenne
- Census-designated places (Note: All census-designated places are unincorporated.)
  - Fox Farm-College
  - Ranchettes
  - South Greeley
  - Warren AFB
- Unincorporated places
  - Granite
  - Horse Creek

== Schools ==
=== High schools ===
- Grades 9-12
  - East High School
  - South High School
  - Central High School
  - Poder Academy Secondary School (Charter school)
- Grades 9-12
  - Triumph High School (Alternative)

=== Junior high schools ===
- Grades 7-8
  - Mccormick Junior High School
  - Johnson Junior High School
  - Carey Junior High School
  - Poder Academy Secondary School (Charter School)

=== Elementary schools ===
- Grades 5-6
  - Coyote Ridge Elementary School
  - Meadowlark Elementary School
- Grades 3-6
  - Fairview Elementary School
- Grades K-6
  - Afflerbach Elementary School
  - Alta Vista Elementary School
  - Arp Elementary School
  - Baggs Elementary School
  - Bain Elementary School
  - Clawson Elementary School
  - Cole Elementary School
  - Freedom Elementary School
  - Gilchrist Elementary School
  - Goins Elementary School
  - Hebard Elementary School
  - Henderson Elementary School
  - Poder Academy (Charter School - K-5)
  - Rossman Elementary School
  - Sunrise Elementary School
  - Willadsen Elementary School
- Grades K-4
  - Anderson Elementary School
  - Buffalo Ridge Elementary School
  - Davis Elementary school
  - Dildine Elementary School
  - Hobbs Elementary School
  - Jessup Elementary School
  - Pioneer Park Elementary School
  - Prairie Wind Elementary School
  - Saddle Ridge Elementary School
- Grades K-2
  - Lebhart Elementary School

== Student demographics ==
The following figures are as of Fall 2010

- Total District Enrollment: 13,170
- Student enrollment by gender
  - Male: Not Listed or Unknown
  - Female: Not Listed or Unknown
- Student enrollment by ethnicity
  - White (not Hispanic): 72.48%
  - Hispanic: 19.61%
  - Black (not Hispanic): 2.64%
  - Asian or Pacific Islander: 0.86%
  - American Indian or Alaskan Native: 0.57%

== See also ==
- List of school districts in Wyoming
