= Wyoming Highway 430 =

State highway in Wyoming, United States

Wyoming Highway 430
- WYO 430 highlighted in red

Route information
- Maintained by WYDOT
- Length: 53.52 mi (86.13 km)

Major junctions
- South end: CR 10N at the Colorado State Line
- North end: WYO 376 in Rock Springs

Location
- Country: United States
- State: Wyoming
- Counties: Sweetwater

Highway system
- Wyoming State Highway System; Interstate; US; State
← WYO 414	→ WYO 431

Wyoming Highway 430 (WYO 430) is a 53.52-mile-long (86.13 km) state highway in south-central Sweetwater County, Wyoming, United States, that connects the Wyoming-Colorado State Line with Rock Springs.

== Route description ==
WYO 430 begins in a remote area on the Colorado State Line, about 8.75 miles (14.08 km) west–northwest of Hiawatha, Colorado. (The roadway continues south into Colorado as Moffat County Route 10N, an unimproved road that connects with Colorado State Highway 318, about 22.3 miles [35.9 km] farther south, west of the northern end of Dinosaur National Monument.) From its southern terminus WYO 430 heads northerly through remote terrain in the Horseshoe Basin for nearly 10 miles (16 km) before passing through a gap in Rife Rim. After continuing north for about another 10 miles (16 km), WYO 430 turns to head northwest for nearly 8 miles (13 km) before turning north again as loops around the south end of Cooper Ridge Just over 10 miles (16 km) farther north, the highway turns to the northwest again to cross over the Salt Wells Creek and pass by the northern end of Sweeney Ranch as it crosses the South Baxter Basin. About 15 miles (24 km) after its last turn to head northwesterly, WYO 430 enters Rock Springs on New Hampshire Street. WYO 430 then turn southwest on Marchant Street, the first cross street in town. (New Hampshire Street, the former routing of WYO 430 continues northeast.) After quickly passing between two sections of the Canyon Court Mobile Home Park, WYO 430 reaches Wyoming Highway 376 (WYO 376/South Side Belt Route), its northern terminus. (WYO 376 heads both east and west to connect with I-80 BL/US 20 Bus., 9th Street on the east and Dewar Street on the west. Marchant Street continues west for a few blocks toward the Rock Springs Municipal Cemetery.)

== History ==
WYO 430 previously extended farther north into Rock Springs. Instead of heading southwest along Marchant Street, the highway continued northwest along New Hampshire Street to Connecticut Avenue, then one block north along that street to D Street. After continuing west, then northwest along D Street, it turned southwest to run along Cedar Street before turning northwest again along A Street. Just after passing over several sets of tracks of the Union Pacific Railroad, A Street turned north for several blocks before reaching the former northern terminus of WYO 430 at I-80 BL/US 20 Bus. (North Center Street/Bridger Avenue) and the southern terminus of the former U.S. Route 187 (US 187) in the northern part of the downtown area. (The former US 187 continued north along Elk Street toward Farson and Pinedale.)

== Major intersections ==
The entire route is in Sweetwater County.

Location	mi	km	Destinations	Notes
	0.00	0.00	CR 10N south – Colorado State Highway 318	Continuation south from southern terminus
	0.00	0.00	Colorado–Wyoming State Line	Southern terminus
Sweeney Ranch	39.60	63.73	Bridge over Salt Wells Creek	
Rock Springs	53.45	86.02	New Hampshire Street northwest	Former routing of WYO 430
Rock Springs	53.52	86.13	WYO 376 east (South Side Belt Route) – I-80 BL/US 20 Bus. WYO 376 west (South Side Belt Route) – I-80 BL/US 20 Bus.	Northern terminus
Rock Springs	53.52	86.13	Marchant Street west – Rock Springs Municipal Cemetery	Continuation west from northern terminus
1.000 mi = 1.609 km; 1.000 km = 0.621 mi

== See also ==
- List of state highways in Wyoming
