= Wyoming Highway 211 =

State highway in Laramie and Platte counties in Wyoming, United States

Wyoming Highway 211
- Horse Creek Road; Iron Mountain Road
- WYO 211 highlighted in yellow

Route information
- Maintained by WYDOT
- Length: 43.88 mi (70.62 km) 63.95 total miles including CR 106-2

Major junctions
- South end: WYO 219 north of Cheyenne
- I-25 / US 85 / US 87 north of Cheyenne
- North end: I-25 / US 87; WYO 313 in Chugwater

Location
- Country: United States
- State: Wyoming
- Counties: Laramie, Platte

Highway system
- Wyoming State Highway System; Interstate; US; State
| ← WYO 210 | → US 212 |
| ← WYO 321 | → WYO 330 |

Wyoming Highway 211 (WYO 211) is a 43.88-mile-long (70.62 km) Wyoming State Road known as Horse Creek Road within Laramie County, and as Iron Mountain Road in Platte County.

== Route description ==
Wyoming Highway 211 begins its south end at Wyoming Highway 219 north of Cheyenne, near I-25 and US 85/US 87 (Exit 16). Highway 211 travels west from WYO 219, and immediately intersects exit 16 of Interstate 25. At 3.8 miles, WYO 211 intersects Round Top Road, the former northern terminus of Wyoming Highway 222. WYO 211 continues west and then northwest to serve the small outlying communities of Lambert, Iron Mountain, Federal, and Horse Creek. Highway 211 temporarily ends at Milepost 42.94 as there is an approximately 20-mile (32 km) gap, and resumes at Milepost 63.01. WYO 211 resumes north of the Laramie-Platte County Line along Iron Mountain Road and Jordan Road (County Route 106–2). Now named Horse Creek Road, WYO 211 reaches the Town of Chugwater at 63.03 miles (101.44 km), and has a junction with I-25 / US 87 and Wyoming Highway 313 at 63.95 miles (102.92 km). This is the northern terminus of WYO 211.

== History ==
The Wyoming Highway 211 section located in Platte County was formerly designated as Wyoming Highway 322.

== Major intersections ==
| County | Location | mi | km | Destinations | Notes |
|---|---|---|---|---|---|
| Laramie | Ranchettes | 0.00 | 0.00 | WYO 219 (Yellowstone Road) – Torrington | Southern terminus; road continues as Iron Mountain Road |
| Laramie | Ranchettes | 0.51 | 0.82 | US 85 (I-25 / US 87) – Cheyenne, Casper, Torrington | Iron Mountain Interchange; exit 16 on I-25 |
| Laramie | | 42.94 | 69.11 | CR 106 north | North end of state maintenance/paved road |
| Laramie–Platte county line | | 63.01 | 101.40 | CR 106 south | South end of state maintenance/paved road |
| Platte | Chugwater | 63.95 | 102.92 | I-25 / US 87 – Cheyenne, Wheatland | Exit 73 on I-25 |
| Platte | Chugwater | 63.95 | 102.92 | WYO 321 (I-25 BL north) – Chugwater | Continuation beyond northern terminus |
1.000 mi = 1.609 km; 1.000 km = 0.621 mi: Route transition

== See also ==
- List of state highways in Wyoming
