= Wyoming Highway 376 =

State highway in Rock Springs, Wyoming, United States

Wyoming Highway 376
- South Side Belt Route
- WYO 376 highlighted in red

Route information
- Maintained by WYDOT
- Length: 4.31 mi (6.94 km)

Major junctions
- Beltway around Rock Springs
- West end: I-80 BL / US 30 Bus.
- WYO 430
- East end: I-80 BL / US 30 Bus.

Location
- Country: United States
- State: Wyoming
- Counties: Sweetwater

Highway system
- Wyoming State Highway System; Interstate; US; State
← WYO 375	→ WYO 377

Wyoming Highway 376 (WYO 376) is a 4.31-mile (6.94 km) state highway in southern Sweetwater County, Wyoming, United States, that forms a loop off of the south side of the city of Rock Springs.

== Route description ==
WYO 376 travels counterclockwise from west to east around the southern edge of Rock Springs. It travels from I-80 BL/US 20 Bus. (I-80 BL/US 20 Bus./Dewar Drive) southeast around the southern end of Rock Springs (briefly leaving the city limits), and turns back north as it nears Wyoming Highway 430 (WYO 430). Marchant Street is intersected at 2.35 miles (3.78 km), and provides access to WYO 430 (New Hampshire Street). WYO 376 crosses over WYO 430 at 2.52 miles (4.06 km) and curves around the eastern side of Rock Springs and to reach its eastern end at Milepost 4.31 miles (6.94 km) where it rejoins I-80 BL/US 20 Bus. (9th Street).

== History ==
WYO 376 formerly continued in a counterclockwise direction from its current eastern terminus to connect back to the former U.S. Route 187 (Elk Street). Since U.S. Route 191 (US 191) was routed onto Interstate 80/U.S. Route 30 (I-80/US 30) north of Rock Springs, that portion of Elk Street was unnumbered. However, Wyoming Department of Transportation (WYDOT) maintains the section of Elk Street between I-80 BL/US 20 Bus. and I-80/US 30. It is mile-marked in the highway log as US 191, although signage shows US 191 bypassing the town via I-80/US 30. The northeast corner of the circumferential highway is not currently maintained by WYDOT.

== Major intersections ==
The entire route is in Sweetwater County.

Location	mi	km	Destinations	Notes
Rock Springs	0.00	0.00	I-80 BL east / US 30 Bus. (Dewar Drive) I-80 BL / US 30 Bus. west (Dewar Drive) – I-80/US 30 Exit 102	Western terminus; T intersection
Rock Springs	2.35	3.78	Marchant Street west – Rock Springs Municipal Cemetery; WYO 430 south (northeast) (Marchant Street) – Sweeney Ranch, Colorado	
Rock Springs	4.31	6.94	I-80 BL east / US 30 Bus. (9th Street) I-80 BL / US 30 Bus. (9th Street) – I-80/US 30 Exit 107	Eastern terminus
Rock Springs	4.31	6.94	North Side Belt Route/Railroad Avenue north – Elk Avenue (formerly US 187)	Continuation north beyond eastern terminus
1.000 mi = 1.609 km; 1.000 km = 0.621 mi

== See also ==
- List of state highways in Wyoming
