= New Mexico State Road 466 =

State highway in New Mexico, United States

State Road 466
- Old Pecos Trail, St. Michaels Drive
- NM 466 highlighted in red

Route information
- Maintained by NMDOT
- Length: 4.000 mi (6.437 km)
- Existed: mid-1980s–present

Major junctions
- Southern end: CR 58D in Santa Fe
- I-25 in Santa Fe; US 84 / US 285 in Santa Fe
- Northern end: NM 14 in Santa Fe

Location
- Country: United States
- State: New Mexico
- Counties: Santa Fe

Highway system
- New Mexico State Highway System; Interstate; US; State; Scenic
| ← NM 464 | → NM 467 |

State Road 466 (NM 466) is a 4-mile-long (6.4 km) state highway in the US state of New Mexico. NM 466's southern terminus is at County Route 58D in Santa Fe, and the northern terminus is at NM 14 in Santa Fe.

== History ==
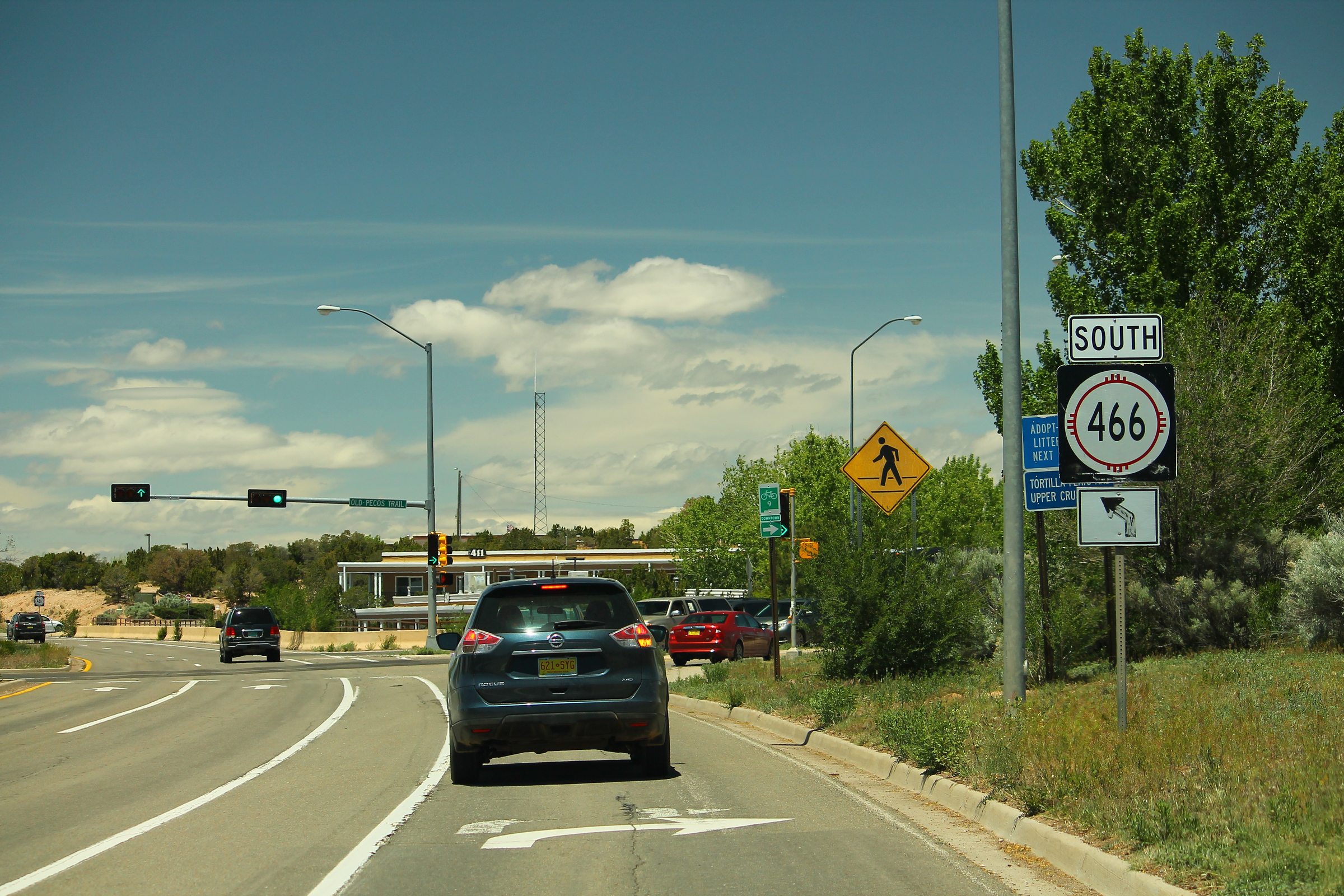
NM 466 southbound

NM 466 was created in the mid-1980s, established on St. Michaels Drive from NM 14 to U.S. Route 84 (US 84) which replaced former US 85 Bypass. In the mid-1990s US 285 was rerouted from Old Pecos Trail to along US 84 (St. Francis Drive). At that time NM 466 was extended along Old Pecos Trail to its current southern terminus.

== Major intersections ==
The entire route is in Santa Fe, Santa Fe County.

| mi | km | Destinations | Notes |
|---|---|---|---|
| 0.000 | 0.000 | NM 14 (Cerillos Road) | Northern terminus |
| 1.227– 1.407 | 1.975– 2.264 | US 84 / US 285 (Saint Francis Drive) | Interchange |
| 3.547 | 5.708 | NM 300 south (Old Las Vegas Highway) / Rodeo Road | Northern terminus of NM 300 |
| 3.668– 3.863 | 5.903– 6.217 | I-25 / US 84 / US 85 / US 285 | I-25 exit 284 |
| 4.000 | 6.437 | CR 58D (Old Aqua Fria Road) | Southern terminus |
1.000 mi = 1.609 km; 1.000 km = 0.621 mi
