= Wyoming Highway 34 =

State highway in Albany and Platte counties in Wyoming, United States

Wyoming Highway 34
- Laramie-Wheatland Road
- WYO 34 highlighted in red

Route information
- Maintained by WYDOT
- Length: 52.38 mi (84.30 km)
- Existed: November 1949–present

Major junctions
- West end: US 30 / US 287 at Bosler Junction
- WYO 312 in Ferguson Corner
- East end: I-25 / US 87 south of Wheatland

Location
- Country: United States
- State: Wyoming
- Counties: Albany, Platte

Highway system
- Wyoming State Highway System; Interstate; US; State
← WYO 33	→ WYO 35
← US 26	→ WYO 28

Wyoming Highway 34 (WYO 34), also known as Laramie-Wheatland Road, is a 52.38-mile (84.30 km) state highway in Albany and Platte counties in Wyoming, United States, that connects U.S. Routes 30 / 287 (US 30 / US 287) south-southeast of Bosler with Interstate 25 / U.S. Route 87 (I-25 / US 87) south of Wheatland.

== Route description ==
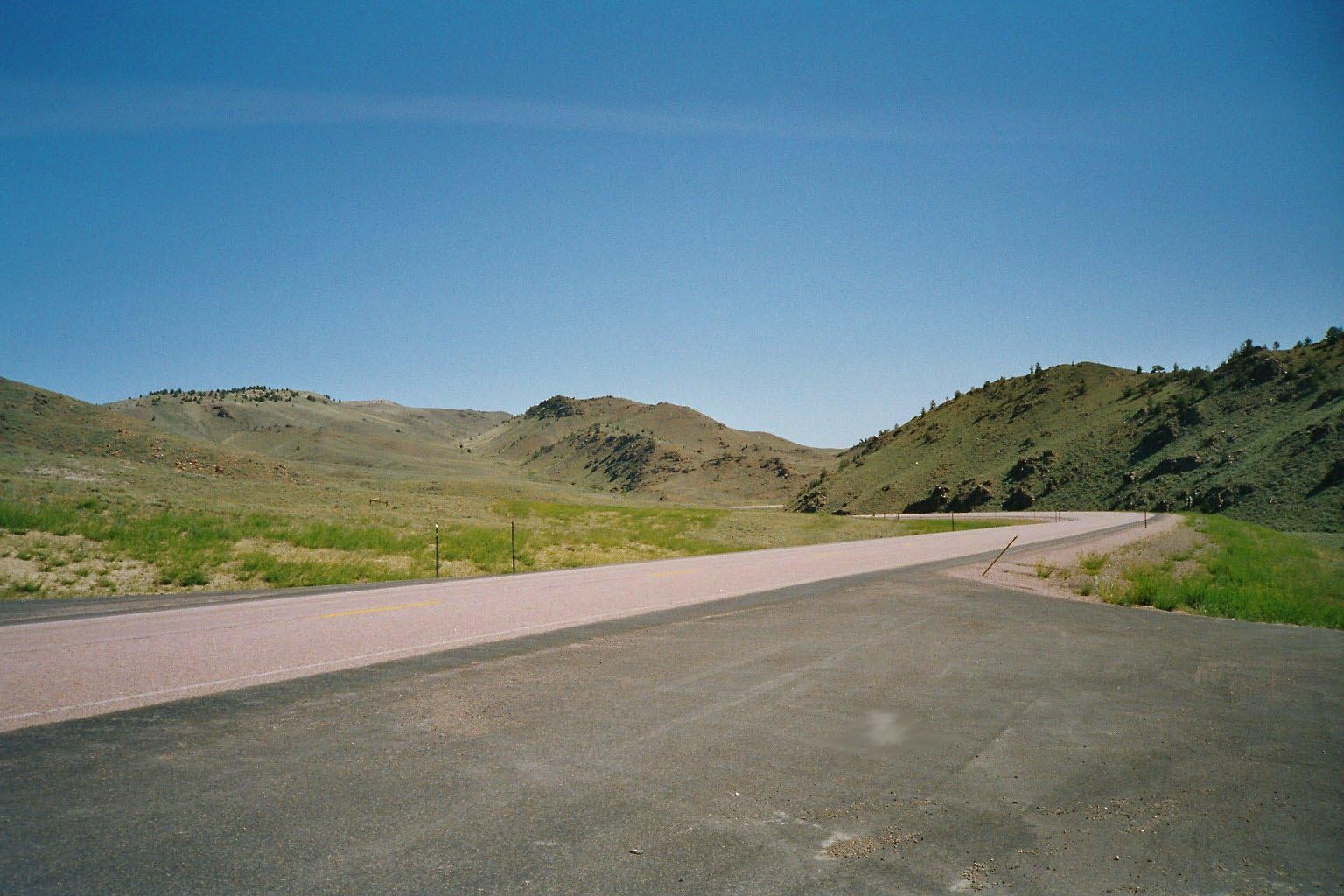
Morton Pass along WYO 34 in Albany County, June 2004

WYO 34 begins at a T intersection with US 30 / US 287 in Bosler Junction, about 1.8 miles (2.9 km) south-southeast of Bosler and just south of the Laramie River. (US 30 / US 287 heads southeast toward Laramie and Cheyenne and northwest toward Rock River and Rawlins.) From its western terminus it heads northeasterly toward Wheatland by way of Morton Pass. Nearing its eastern end, WYO 34 connects with the southern end of Wyoming Highway 312 in Ferguson Corner, which is the former routing of WYO 34 into Wheatland. (WYO 312 heads north towards Wheatland.} WYO 34 reaches its eastern terminus at a diamond interchange with I-25 / US 87 (I-25 Exit 73) just south of Wheatland. (I-25 / US 87 heads north toward Wheatland and Douglas and south toward Chugwater and Cheyenne.)

== History ==
Between 1926 and November 1949, WYO 34 was designated as Wyoming Highway 26. After U.S. Route 26 (US 26) was extended west across Wyoming to Wheatland (where it ended at US 87) and US 26 was officially designated, WYO 26 was renumbered WYO 34 to avoid confusion.

== Major intersections ==
County	Location	mi	km	Destinations	Notes
Albany	Bosler Junction	0.00	0.00	US 30 east / US 287 south – Laramie, Cheyenne US 30 west / US 287 north – Rock River, Rawlins	Western terminus; T intersection
Platte	Ferguson Corner	50.78	81.72	WYO 312 north (Ferguson Rd) – Wheatland; S Ferguson Rd south	Southern end of WYO 312; former routing of WYO 34
Platte		52.38	84.30	I-25 north / US 87 north – Wheatland, Douglas I-25 south / US 87 south – Chugwater, Cheyenne	Eastern terminus; I-25 exit 73; diamond interchange
Platte		52.38	84.30	Frontage Road north – Wheatland	Continuation east, then promptly north from eastern terminus
1.000 mi = 1.609 km; 1.000 km = 0.621 mi

== See also ==
- List of state highways in Wyoming
