= Dwyer, Wyoming =

Unincorporated community in Platte County, Wyoming, United States

- Unincorporated community
- Location within Wyoming
- Coordinates: 42°14′32″N 104°57′22″W
- Country: United States
- State: Wyoming
- County: Platte
- Elevation: 4,833 ft (1,473 m)
- Time zone: UTC-7 (Mountain (MST))
  - Summer (DST): UTC-6 (MDT)
- Area code: 307
- GNIS feature ID: 1597299

Dwyer is an unincorporated community in Platte County, Wyoming, United States.

== Description ==
The community, as well as the former Dwyer train station, was named after J. E. Dwyer, a Colorado and Southern Railroad superintendent.
