= Cheyenne South High School =

Coordinates: 41°06′34″N 104°49′09″W

Location
- 1213 W Allison Rd; Cheyenne, Wyoming 82007; United States

Information
- Type: Public secondary
- Established: 2009
- School district: Laramie County School District #1
- Principal: Kerri Gentry
- Teaching staff: 84.18 (FTE)
- Grades: 9–12
- Enrollment: 1,331 (2024-25)
- Student to teacher ratio: 14.10
- Colors: Vegas gold and black
- Athletics conference: WHSAA Class 4A
- Mascot: Bison
- Website: south.laramie1.org

Cheyenne South High School is a public secondary school (grades 9–12) located in Cheyenne, Wyoming, United States. It serves Laramie County School District #1.

Cheyenne South High School officially opened in August 2009, with freshmen only. The freshmen attended classes at Johnson Junior High School, but participated in activities and competed athletically as South High School. A new state-of-the-art building opened in the fall of 2010. During the 2010–2011 school year, South High consisted of about 480 freshmen and sophomores. South High became a grade 9–12 school in the fall of 2012 with an enrollment of approximately 1,200 students.

The school has an auditorium that seats 743 people. The entire school has wireless Internet. Kitchens are built off foreign language rooms, so students can cook ethnic foods. Industrial-style stoves are provided in the culinary class kitchens. South High also has classrooms and equipment for welding, construction, drafting, auto mechanics and health occupations.

The school's cheer squad won first place in the Wyoming State Spirit competition in 2012, 2013, 2014, and 2018. The school's two gyms display its gold and black colors. There is also an eight-lane 25-meter swimming pool. The pool is surrounded with spectator seats and a viewing area. They are the first school in the state of Wyoming to do a lip dub. The theatre team took first place in proscenium in 2013 at State Theatre. The school also has outdoor tennis courts and a football stadium.

The Cheyenne South Speech and Debate team qualified three students to the national tournament in the 2012–2013 season.

The Cheyenne South High Bison marching Band has a 14 year superior ranking streak.
