= Las Vegas Municipal Airport =

Coordinates: 35°39′15″N 105°08′33″W

- IATA: LVS; ICAO: KLVS; FAA LID: LVS

Summary
- Airport type: Public
- Owner: City of Las Vegas
- Serves: Las Vegas, New Mexico
- Elevation AMSL: 6,877 ft / 2,096 m
- Interactive map of Las Vegas Municipal Airport

Runways
Direction	Length		Surface
Direction	ft	m	Surface
2/20	5,006	1,526	Asphalt
14/32	8,199	2,499	Asphalt

Statistics (2021)
- Aircraft operations (year ending 3/31/2021): 11,500
- Based aircraft: 4
- Source: Federal Aviation Administration

Las Vegas Municipal Airport (IATA: LVS, ICAO: KLVS, FAA LID: LVS) is five miles (8 km) northeast of Las Vegas, in San Miguel County, New Mexico.

The airport was a stop on the first air route between Denver and El Paso that began in 1929. Mid-Continental Air Express first flew the route with stops at Colorado Springs, Pueblo, Las Vegas, Santa Fe, and Albuquerque. Western Air Express acquired the route by 1931, replaced by Varney Speed Lines Lockheed Vegas in 1934. In 1937 Continental Airlines flew Lockheed Model 10 Electras followed by Lockheed Lodestars.

Service was interrupted in the late 1930s but Continental returned with Douglas DC-3s and stops were added at Trinidad, Colorado and at Raton, Socorro, Truth or Consequences, and Las Cruces, New Mexico. Continental pulled out in 1952 due to airport conditions. Pioneer Air Lines DC-3s served Las Vegas from 1948 to 1952 on a route between Albuquerque and Dallas via Santa Fe, Las Vegas, Tucumcari, Clovis, Lubbock, Abilene, Mineral Wells, and Ft. Worth.

Two commuter airlines briefly served Las Vegas: Trans Central Airlines in 1969/1970 with flights to Albuquerque and Denver on a route similar to that of Continental, and Territorial Airlines in 1990 with flights to Albuquerque and Raton, NM. The airport currently receives air cargo service by South Aero with flights to Albuquerque on behalf of UPS.

== Facilities ==
The airport covers 1,300 acres (530 ha) and has two asphalt runways: 2/20 is 5,006 x 75 ft (1,526 x 23 m) and 14/32 is 8,199 x 75 ft (2,499 x 23 m).

In the year ending March 31, 2021 the airport had 11,500 aircraft operations, average 31 per day: 96% general aviation and 4% military. 4 aircraft were then based at this airport: 3 single-engine, and 1 multi-engine.

== In film ==
The airport appeared in the 2011 film Haywire.
