= Wheatland Reservoir =

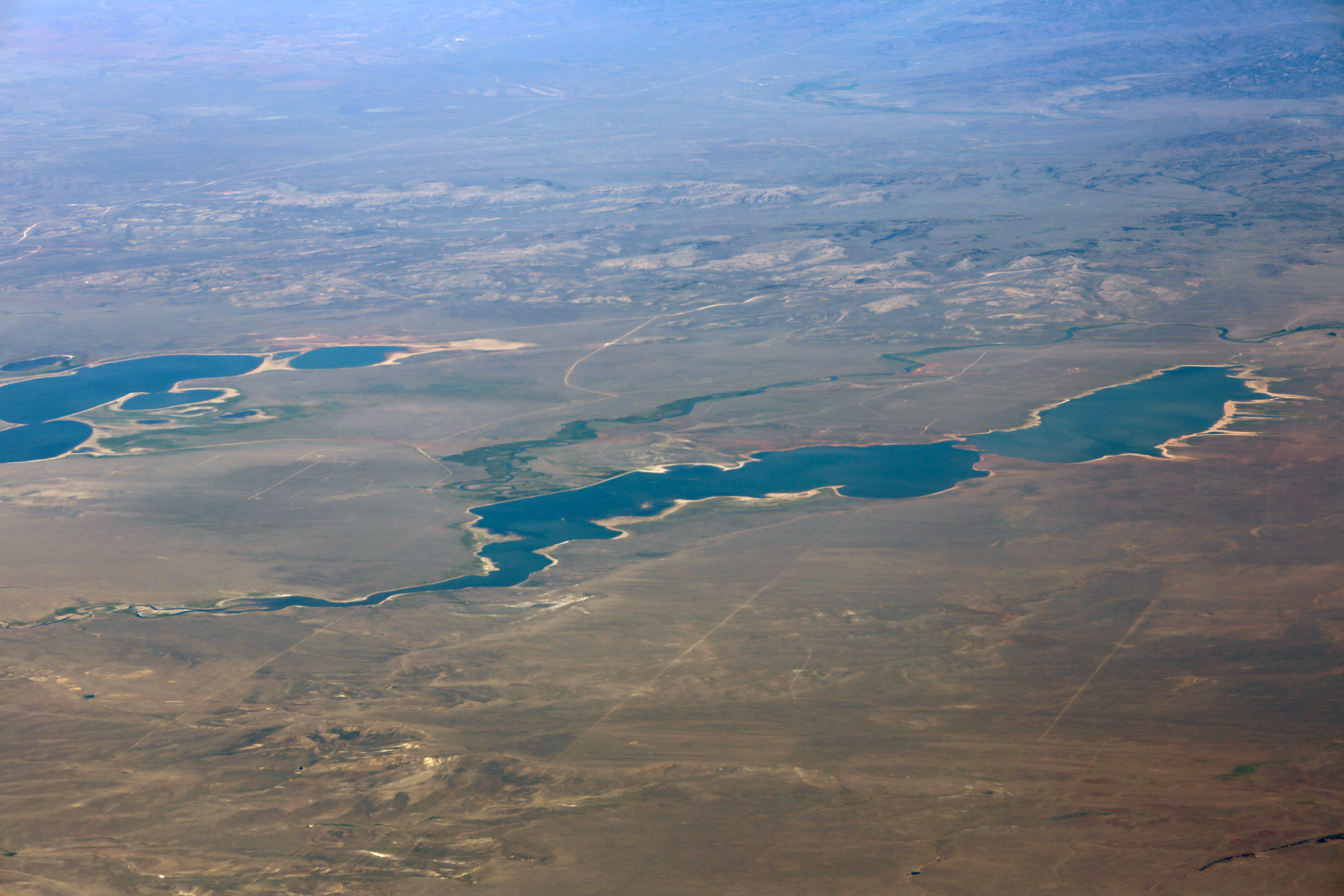
- The Wheatland Reservoirs, 2012

- Location within Wyoming Location within the United States
- Location: Albany / Platte counties, southwest of Wheatland, Wyoming
- Coordinates: 42°00′00″N 105°02′02″W 41°50′18″N 105°38′20″W41°53′30″N 105°43′38″W
- Type: reservoir
- Basin countries: United States

Wheatland Reservoir is the name of three reservoirs located near Wheatland in the U.S. State of Wyoming. Wheatland Reservoir Number 1 is located nearest to the town of Wheatland. It was formed by impounding Canal No 3 which is fed by Sybille Creek coming off the eastern slope of the Laramie Mountains. Wheatland Reservoir Number 2 is located on the western side of the Laramie Mountains. It was formed by impounding the Laramie River. Nearby Wheatland Reservoir Number 3 is fed by a canal from Reservoir Number 2 and the Laramie River.

== See also ==
- List of largest reservoirs of Wyoming
