= Ranchettes, Wyoming =

Ranchettes
- Census-designated place
- Location in Laramie County and the state of Wyoming
- Coordinates: 41°14′20″N 104°46′23″W
- Country: United States
- State: Wyoming
- County: Laramie

Area
  - Total: 49.2 sq mi (127.4 km^{2})
  - Land: 49.2 sq mi (127.4 km^{2})
  - Water: 0 sq mi (0.0 km^{2})
- Elevation: 6,201 ft (1,890 m)

Population (2020)
  - Total: 6,199
  - Density: 126.0/sq mi (48.66/km^{2})
- Time zone: UTC-7 (Mountain (MST))
  - Summer (DST): UTC-6 (MDT)
- Area code: 307
- GNIS feature ID: 2409130
- FIPS code: 56-63800

Ranchettes is a census-designated place (CDP) in Laramie County, Wyoming, United States. It is part of the Cheyenne, Wyoming Metropolitan Statistical Area. The population was 5,798 at the 2010 census.

== Geography ==
According to the United States Census Bureau, the CDP has a total area of 49.2 square miles (127.4 km^{2}), all land.

== Demographics ==
=== 2020 census ===
As of the 2020 census, Ranchettes had a population of 6,199. The median age was 50.1 years. 21.4% of residents were under the age of 18 and 24.5% of residents were 65 years of age or older. For every 100 females there were 103.2 males, and for every 100 females age 18 and over there were 102.3 males age 18 and over.

18.1% of residents lived in urban areas, while 81.9% lived in rural areas.

There were 2,372 households in Ranchettes, of which 28.0% had children under the age of 18 living in them. Of all households, 72.0% were married-couple households, 13.7% were households with a male householder and no spouse or partner present, and 10.0% were households with a female householder and no spouse or partner present. About 16.6% of all households were made up of individuals and 7.6% had someone living alone who was 65 years of age or older.

There were 2,456 housing units, of which 3.4% were vacant. The homeowner vacancy rate was 0.6% and the rental vacancy rate was 5.1%.

Racial composition as of the 2020 census
| Race | Number | Percent |
|---|---|---|
| White | 5,494 | 88.6% |
| Black or African American | 40 | 0.6% |
| American Indian and Alaska Native | 32 | 0.5% |
| Asian | 53 | 0.9% |
| Native Hawaiian and Other Pacific Islander | 8 | 0.1% |
| Some other race | 112 | 1.8% |
| Two or more races | 460 | 7.4% |
| Hispanic or Latino (of any race) | 476 | 7.7% |

=== 2000 census ===
As of the census of 2000, there were 4,869 people, 1,764 households, and 1,488 families reside in the CDP. The population density was 94.7 people per square mile (36.6/km^{2}). There were 1,812 housing units at an average density of 35.2/sq mi (13.6/km^{2}). The racial makeup of the CDP was 94.97% White, 0.88% African American, 0.86% Native American, 0.92% Asian, 0.02% Pacific Islander, 1.40% from other races, and 0.94% from two or more races. Hispanic or Latino of any race were 4.79% of the population.

There were 1,764 households, out of which 34.5% had children under the age of 18 living with them, 75.7% were married couples living together, 5.3% had a female householder with no husband present, and 15.6% were non-families. 12.1% of all households were made up of individuals, and 3.7% had someone living alone who was 65 years of age or older. The average household size was 2.76 and the average family size was 2.98.

In the CDP, the population was spread out, with 25.3% under the age of 18, 6.6% from 18 to 24, 23.5% from 25 to 44, 35.9% from 45 to 64, and 8.7% who were 65 years of age or older. The median age was 42 years. For every 100 females, there were 98.4 males. For every 100 females age 18 and over, there were 97.2 males.

The median income for a household in the CDP was $72,758, and the median income for a family was $74,901. Males had a median income of $48,534 versus $32,963 for females. The per capita income for the CDP was $27,134. About 3.7% of families and 4.7% of the population were below the poverty line, including 5.9% of those under age 18 and 7.4% of those age 65 or over.

== Education ==
Public education in the community of Ranchettes is provided by Laramie County School District #1.
