= Westview Circle, Wyoming =

- CDP
- Location in Platte County and the state of Wyoming
- Coordinates: 42°03′38″N 105°04′17″W
- Country: United States
- State: Wyoming
- County: Platte

Area
  - Total: 2.3 sq mi (6.0 km^{2})
  - Land: 2.3 sq mi (5.9 km^{2})
  - Water: 0.039 sq mi (0.1 km^{2})
- Elevation: 4,731 ft (1,442 m)

Population (2010)
  - Total: 52
  - Density: 23/sq mi (8.8/km^{2})
- Time zone: UTC-7 (Mountain (MST))
  - Summer (DST): UTC-6 (MDT)
- Area code: 307
- FIPS code: 56-82967
- GNIS feature ID: 2409576

Westview Circle is a census-designated place (CDP) in Platte County, Wyoming, United States. The population was 52 at the 2010 census.

== Geography ==
According to the United States Census Bureau, the CDP has a total area of 2.3 square miles (6.0 km^{2}), of which 2.3 square miles (5.9 km^{2}) is land and 0.04 square mile (0.1 km^{2}) (1.58%) is water.

== Demographics ==
As of the census of 2000, there were 67 people, 25 households, and 22 families residing in the CDP. The population density was 29.5 people per square mile (11.4/km^{2}). There were 25 housing units at an average density of 11.0/sq mi (4.3/km^{2}). The racial makeup of the CDP was 100.00% White.

There were 25 households, out of which 40.0% had children under the age of 18 living with them, 84.0% were married couples living together, 4.0% had a female householder with no husband present, and 12.0% were non-families. 12.0% of all households were made up of individuals, and 4.0% had someone living alone who was 65 years of age or older. The average household size was 2.68 and the average family size was 2.91.

In the CDP, the population was spread out, with 31.3% under the age of 18, 26.9% from 25 to 44, 29.9% from 45 to 64, and 11.9% who were 65 years of age or older. The median age was 40 years. For every 100 females, there were 91.4 males. For every 100 females age 18 and over, there were 91.7 males.

The median income for a household in the CDP was $40,714, and the median income for a family was $42,321. Males had a median income of $36,500 versus $31,250 for females. The per capita income for the CDP was $16,782. None of the population or the families were below the poverty line.

== Education ==
Public education in the community of Westview Circle is provided by Platte County School District #1.
