= South Greeley, Wyoming =

South Greeley
- Census-designated place
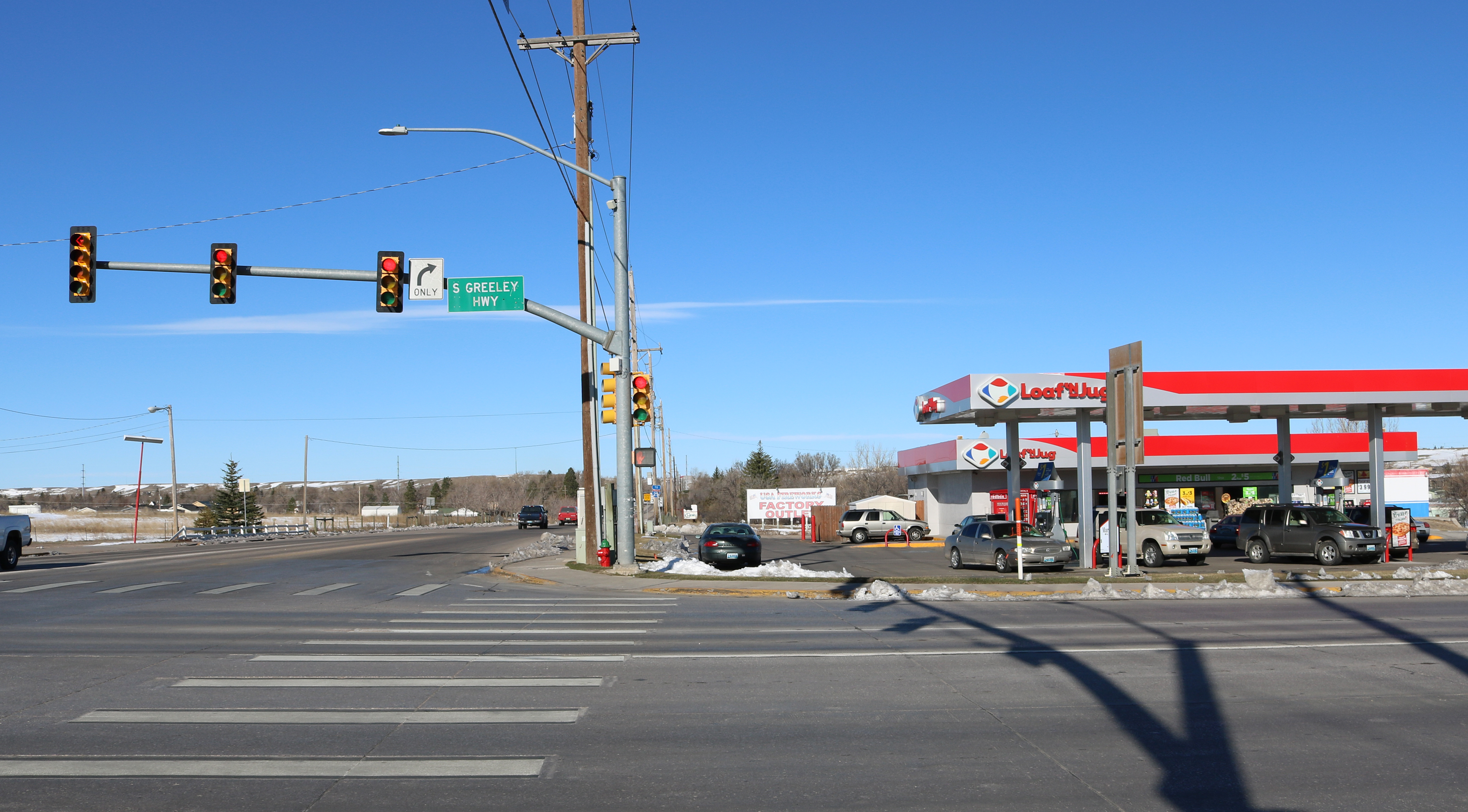
- Looking west from the Intersection of South Greeley Highway (U.S. Route 85) and College Drive in South Greeley.

- Location in Laramie County and the state of Wyoming
- Coordinates: 41°05′35″N 104°28′24″W
- Country: United States
- State: Wyoming
- County: Laramie

Area
  - Total: 1.7 sq mi (4.4 km^{2})
  - Land: 1.7 sq mi (4.4 km^{2})
  - Water: 0 sq mi (0.0 km^{2})
- Elevation: 6,047 ft (1,843 m)

Population (2020)
  - Total: 4,733
  - Density: 2,800/sq mi (1,100/km^{2})
- Time zone: UTC-7 (Mountain (MST))
  - Summer (DST): UTC-6 (MDT)
- Area code: 307
- GNIS feature ID: 2408765
- FIPS code: 56-71800

South Greeley is a census-designated place (CDP) in Laramie County, Wyoming, United States. It is part of the Cheyenne, Wyoming Metropolitan Statistical Area. The population was 4,733 at the 2020 census. The population was 4,217 at the 2010 census.

== Geography ==
According to the United States Census Bureau, the CDP has a total area of 1.7 square miles (4.4 km^{2}), all land.

Despite its name, South Greeley is not adjacent to any other municipality with Greeley in its name. The nearest such place, Greeley, Colorado, lies approximately 50 miles to the south of South Greeley.

== Demographics ==
=== 2020 census ===
As of the 2020 census, South Greeley had a population of 4,733. The median age was 34.0 years. 26.9% of residents were under the age of 18 and 11.3% of residents were 65 years of age or older. For every 100 females there were 100.0 males, and for every 100 females age 18 and over there were 99.7 males age 18 and over.

99.6% of residents lived in urban areas, while 0.4% lived in rural areas.

There were 1,879 households in South Greeley, of which 32.5% had children under the age of 18 living in them. Of all households, 37.6% were married-couple households, 25.1% were households with a male householder and no spouse or partner present, and 26.5% were households with a female householder and no spouse or partner present. About 29.7% of all households were made up of individuals and 10.3% had someone living alone who was 65 years of age or older.

There were 1,999 housing units, of which 6.0% were vacant. The homeowner vacancy rate was 1.1% and the rental vacancy rate was 8.9%.

Racial composition as of the 2020 census
Race	Number	Percent
White	3,313	70.0%
Black or African American	114	2.4%
American Indian and Alaska Native	78	1.6%
Asian	58	1.2%
Native Hawaiian and Other Pacific Islander	6	0.1%
Some other race	438	9.3%
Two or more races	726	15.3%
Hispanic or Latino (of any race)	1,225	25.9%

=== 2000 census ===
At the 2000 census, there were 4,201 people, 1,553 households and 1,091 families residing in the CDP. The population density was 2,489.6 per square mile (959.8/km^{2}). There were 1,679 housing units at an average density of 995.0/sq mi (383.6/km^{2}). The racial makeup of the CDP was 84.86% White, 2.31% African American, 1.50% Native American, 0.33% Asian, 7.19% from other races, and 3.81% from two or more races. Hispanic or Latino of any race were 14.90% of the population.

There were 1,553 households, of which 42.0% had children under the age of 18 living with them, 48.6% were married couples living together, 14.8% had a female householder with no husband present, and 29.7% were non-families. 22.5% of all households were made up of individuals, and 4.7% had someone living alone who was 65 years of age or older. The average household size was 2.71 and the average family size was 3.15.

32.1% of the population were under the age of 18, 10.9% from 18 to 24, 33.8% from 25 to 44, 17.8% from 45 to 64, and 5.3% who were 65 years of age or older. The median age was 29 years. For every 100 females, there were 103.3 males. For every 100 females age 18 and over, there were 101.2 males.

The median household income was $31,729 and the median family income was $34,015. Males had a median income of $28,468 vand females $19,696. The per capita income was $13,925. About 14.0% of families and 16.6% of the population were below the poverty line, including 23.4% of those under age 18 and 12.2% of those age 65 or over.

== Education ==
Public education in the community of South Greeley is provided by Laramie County School District #1.

Additional educational services of Higher vocational training and college-level courses in the community of South Greely is offered at Laramie County Community College.
