= Fox Farm-College, Wyoming =

Fox Farm-College
- Census-designated place
- Location in Laramie County and the state of Wyoming
- Coordinates: 41°07′18″N 104°47′05″W
- Country: United States
- State: Wyoming
- County: Laramie

Area
  - Total: 3.5 sq mi (9.0 km^{2})
  - Land: 3.5 sq mi (9.0 km^{2})
  - Water: 0 sq mi (0.0 km^{2})

Population (2010)
  - Total: 3,647
  - Density: 1,000/sq mi (410/km^{2})
- Time zone: UTC-7 (Mountain (MST))
  - Summer (DST): UTC-6 (MDT)
- Area code: 307
- GNIS feature ID: 2408252
- FIPS code: 56-29300

Fox Farm-College is a census-designated place (CDP) in Laramie County, Wyoming, United States. It is part of the Cheyenne, Wyoming Metropolitan Statistical Area. The population was 3,876 people at the 2020 census.

== Geography ==
According to the United States Census Bureau, the CDP has a total area of 3.5 square miles (9.0 km^{2}), all land.

== Demographics ==
As of the 2020 census, there were 3,876 people. The population was 3,647 at the 2010 census. As of the census of 2000, there were 3,272 people, 1,283 households, and 809 families residing in the CDP. The population density was 975.4 people per square mile (377.1/km^{2}). There were 1,405 housing units at an average density of 418.8/sq mi (161.9/km^{2}). The racial makeup of the CDP was 88.54% White, 1.34% African American, 1.56% Native American, 0.28% Asian, 0.09% Pacific Islander, 4.92% from other races, and 3.27% from two or more races. Hispanic or Latino of any race were 12.62% of the population.

There were 1,283 households, out of which 34.9% had children under the age of 18 living with them, 42.6% were married couples living together, 15.0% had a female householder with no husband present, and 36.9% were non-families. 28.7% of all households were made up of individuals, and 7.4% had someone living alone who was 65 years of age or older. The average household size was 2.45 and the average family size was 3.02.

In the CDP, the population was spread out, with 27.5% under the age of 18, 14.0% from 18 to 24, 30.0% from 25 to 44, 20.1% from 45 to 64, and 8.4% who were 65 years of age or older. The median age was 31 years. For every 100 females, there were 102.4 males. For every 100 females age 18 and over, there were 99.7 males.

The median income for a household in the CDP was $26,984, and the median income for a family was $29,265. Males had a median income of $23,860 versus $23,924 for females. The per capita income for the CDP was $15,099. About 16.8% of families and 22.0% of the population were below the poverty line, including 36.8% of those under age 18 and 9.8% of those age 65 or over.

== Education ==
Public education in the community of Fox Farm-College is provided by Laramie County School District #1.
