= List of Interstate Highways in New Mexico =

- Standard route signage used for Interstate 25 and Business Loop 40 in New Mexico
- Interstate Highways highlighted in red

Highway names
- Interstates: Interstate XX (I-XX)
- US Highways: U.S. Route XX (US XX)
- State: State Road XX (NM XX)

System links
- New Mexico State Highway System; Interstate; US; State; Scenic

== Mainline highways ==
Number	Length (mi)	Length (km)	Southern or western terminus	Northern or eastern terminus	Formed	Removed	Notes
I-10	164.26	264.35	I-10 at the Arizona state line	I-10 at the Texas state line	1957	current	Replaced nearly all of US 80
I-25	462.12	743.71	I-10 at Las Cruces	I-25 at the Colorado state line	1957	current	Longest interstate in New Mexico. Replaced and runs along unsigned US 85 in its entire length in the state. Also part of the CanAm Highway
I-27	—	—	Texas state line	I-25 near Raton	proposed	—	Proposed as part of the Ports-to-Plains Corridor
I-40	373.51	601.11	I-40 at the Arizona state line	I-40 at the Texas state line	1957	current	Replacement of historic Route 66

== Business routes ==
Number	Length (mi)	Length (km)	Southern or western terminus	Northern or eastern terminus	Formed	Removed	Notes
I-10 BL	4.370	7.033	I-10 in Lordsburg	I-10 in Lordsburg	—	—	
I-10 BL	4.458	7.174	I-10 in Deming	I-10 in Deming	—	—	
I-25 BL	5.711	9.191	I-25 in Williamsburg	I-25 in Truth or Consequences	—	—	Once concurrent with US 85 before it was realigned to I-25.
I-25 BL	2.879	4.633	I-25 in Socorro	I-25 in Socorro	—	—	
I-25 BL	6.645	10.694	I-25 in Belen	I-25 in Belen	—	—	
I-25 BL	9.370	15.080	I-25 in Santa Fe	I-25 in Santa Fe	—	—	
I-25 BL	4.240	6.824	I-25 in Las Vegas	I-25 in Las Vegas	—	—	Runs concurrent with unsigned US 85 in its entire length. Part of CanAm Highway
I-25 BL	3.430	5.520	I-25 near Springer	I-25 near Springer	—	—	Unsigned. Some maps display the route's shields
I-25 BL	4.161	6.696	I-25 in Raton	I-25 near Raton	—	—	
I-40 BL	—	—	I-40 in Gallup	I-40 in Gallup	—	—	Ran along US 66
I-40 BL	—	—	I-40 in Milan	I-40 in Grants	—	—	
I-40 BL	—	—	I-40 in Albuquerque	I-40 in Albuquerque	—	—	Ran concurrent with former US 66
I-40 BL	2.922	4.703	I-40 in Moriarty	I-40 in Moriarty	—	—	Runs concurrent with former US 66
I-40 BL	4.367	7.028	I-40 in Santa Rosa	I-40 in Santa Rosa	—	—	Runs concurrent with US 84 in its entire length
I-40 BL	7.652	12.315	I-40 in Tucumcari	I-40 in Tucumcari	—	—	Runs concurrent with former US 66
Former
