= Special routes of U.S. Route 87 =

Highway system

Special routes of U.S. Route 87

Highway system
- United States Numbered Highway System; List; Special; Divided

Several special routes of U.S. Route 87 exist. In order from south to north they are as follows.

== Texas ==
There are six current, and one former, business routes for US 87 in Texas. In addition, there was several special routes along former US 87 sections in the state.

== Wyoming ==
=== Cheyenne business loop ===
U.S. Highway 87 Business
- Location: Cheyenne
- Length: 8.006 mi (12.884 km)

U.S. Route 87 Business is a business route signed in the Cheyenne, Wyoming. This road is entirely concurrent with Interstate 25 Business Loop.

=== Wheatland business loop ===
U.S. Highway 87 Business
- Location: Wheatland
- Length: 2.960 mi (4.764 km)

U.S. Route 87 Business is a business route signed in the Wheatland, Wyoming. This road is entirely concurrent with Interstate 25 Business Loop.

=== Douglas business loop ===
U.S. Highway 87 Business
- Location: Douglas
- Length: 4.966 mi (7.992 km)

U.S. Route 87 Business is a business route signed in the Douglas, Wyoming. This road is entirely concurrent with Interstate 25 Business Loop, U.S. Route 20 Business, and U.S. Route 26 Business.

=== Casper business loop ===
U.S. Highway 87 Business
- Location: Casper
- Length: 2.195 mi (3.533 km)

U.S. Route 87 Business is a business route signed in the Casper, Wyoming. This road is entirely concurrent with Interstate 25 Business Loop, as well as partially concurrent with U.S. Route 20 Business, and U.S. Route 26 Business.

=== Buffalo business loop ===
U.S. Highway 87 Business
- Location: Buffalo
- Length: 3.314 mi (5.333 km)

U.S. Route 87 Business is a business route signed in the Buffalo, Wyoming. This road is entirely concurrent with Interstate 25 Business Loop and partially concurrent with Interstate 90 Business Loop.

=== Sheridan business loop ===
U.S. Highway 87 Business
- Location: Sheridan
- Length: 4.237 mi (6.819 km)

U.S. Route 87 Business is a business route signed in the Sheridan, Wyoming. This road is entirely concurrent with Interstate 90 Business Loop and U.S. Route 14 Business.

== Montana ==
=== Lewistown bypass ===
U.S. Highway 87 Bypass
- Location: Lewistown
- Length: 3.253 mi (5.235 km)

U.S. Highway 87 Bypass (US 87 Byp.) in Lewistown, also known as the Truck Bypass, is an unsigned highway follows the northern and western edge of the city. The route begins at Main Street (US 87/MT 200), just east of downtown, and follows 1st Avenue North to Kendall Road (US 191 north), where the roadway turns westward becoming 6th Avenue North and also becomes part of US 191. Just west of Lewistown, the roadway turns southwest and re-joins US 87/MT 200. US 87 Byp. is unsigned as the majority of the route is signed as part of US 191. It is known internally by Montana Department of Transportation as part of Corridor N-43 (C000043) and N-75 (C000075).

=== Great Falls bypass ===
U.S. Highway 87 Bypass
- Location: Great Falls
- Length: 4.994 mi (8.037 km)

U.S. Highway 87 Bypass (US 87 Byp.) exists on the eastern and northern edge of Great Falls. The route begins at 10th Avenue South (US 87/US 89/MT 3/MT 200) west of Malmstrom Air Force Base along 57th Street South and runs south to north. Just south of the intersection with 2nd Avenue North the name of the road changes to 57th Street North. At 10th Avenue North, the street name changes to River Drive North, then curves towards the west as it crosses the former Milwaukee Road railroad line at grade. The route heads straight west until after the intersection of North Park Trail where it curves to the northwest. After a railroad crossing and the entrance to Giant Springs State Park and the Lewis and Clark Interpretive Center, the road curves to the southwest, generally following the south bank of the Missouri River. US 87 Byp. ends at US 87 south of the 15th Street Bridge, but River Drive North continues along the Missouri River through Riverside Park. It is known internally by Montana Department of Transportation as Corridor N-102 (C005205).
