= Wyoming Highway 319 =

State highway in Wyoming, United States

Wyoming Highway 319
- Old Yellowstone Highway
- WYO 319 in red, WYO 319 Spur in blue

Route information
- Maintained by WYDOT
- Length: 28.75 mi (46.27 km)

Major junctions
- South end: I-25 / US 26 / US 87 north of Wheatland
- North end: US 18 / US 20 in Orin

Location
- Country: United States
- State: Wyoming
- Counties: Platte, Converse

Highway system
- Wyoming State Highway System; Interstate; US; State
← WYO 318	→ WYO 320
← US 85	→ US 89
← I-180	→ US 189

Wyoming Highway 319 (WYO 319) is a 28.75-mile-long (46.27 km) north-south state highway in Platte and Converse counties.

== Route description ==
WYO 319 is a north–south highway that follows the old Yellowstone Highway, therefore the current highway is named Old Yellowstone Highway. WYO 319 begins at an interchange with Interstate 25/U.S. Route 26/U.S. Route 87 (I-25/US 26/US 87; exit 100) and from there heads northeast then north towards Glendo. At 6.21 miles (9.99 km), WYO 319 has an intersection with a local road which heads west to exit 104 off I-25/US 26/US 87. Still heading north, WYO 319 enters Glendo from the south, intersecting A Street at 14.16 miles (22.79 km). A Street is designated as WYO 319 Spur for 0.2 miles (0.32 km) between WYO 319 and I-25/US 26/US 87 (exit 111). As WYO 319 leaves Glendo, at 15.4 miles (24.8 km), there is a road named Lake Shore Road that travels east of WYO 319 and allows access to Glendo State Park, one of Wyoming's most popular boating parks. WYO 319 heads northwest and parallels I-25/US 26/US 87 that lies to the west and the Glendo Reservoir/North Platte River that lies to the east. I-25/US 26/US 87 breaks its parallel and leaves to head more northwest towards Douglas, while WYO 319 turns north to come to an end at US 18/US 20 in Orin at 28.84 miles (46.41 km).

== History ==
WYO 319 is the original alignment of Old US 185 between 1926 and 1936 and US 87 (Yellowstone Highway) from 1936 until I-25 was completed (between 1956 and the 1980s) and therefore routed along it.

== Major intersections ==
County	Location	mi	km	Destinations	Notes
Platte		0.00	0.00	I-25 / US 26 / US 87 – Wheatland, Glendo	Southern terminus; I-25 exit 100
Platte	Glendo	14.60	23.50	A Street (WYO 319 Spur) to I-25	
Converse	Orin	28.75	46.27	US 18 / US 20 – Douglas, Lusk	Northern terminus
1.000 mi = 1.609 km; 1.000 km = 0.621 mi

== Wyoming Highway 319 Spur ==
Wyoming Highway 319 Spur
- Location: Glendo
- Length: 0.20 mi (320 m)

Wyoming Highway 319 Spur (WYO 319 Spur) is an unsigned 0.20-mile (0.3 km) long spur route of WYO 319 in Glendo. WYO 319 Spur travels from WYO 319 west to I-25/US 26/US 87 (exit 111) at the Glendo Interchange.
