= Wyoming Highway 224 =

State highway in Wyoming, United States

Wyoming Highway 224
- Wyoming Department of Transportation Headquarters Entrance
- WYO 224 highlighted in red

Route information
- Maintained by WYDOT
- Length: 0.12 mi (190 m)

Major junctions
- East end: I-25 / US 87 US 85 / I-25 BL / US 87 Bus.
- West end: WYDOT Headquarters

Location
- Country: United States
- State: Wyoming
- Counties: Laramie

Highway system
- Wyoming State Highway System; Interstate; US; State
← WYO 223	→ WYO 225

Wyoming Highway 224 (WYO 224) is a short 0.12-mile-long (0.19 km) unsigned Wyoming State Road for the Wyoming Department of Transportation (WYDOT) Headquarters and the central Wyoming Department of Fish & Game offices, located in Cheyenne.

== Route description ==
Unsigned Wyoming Highway 224 travels from exit 12 of Interstate 25/U.S. Route 87 west to the Wyoming Department of Transportation (WYDOT) Headquarters and the central Wyoming Department of Fish & Game. If headed north on I-25 BUS, US 85, and US 87 BUS (Central Avenue) and cross Interstate 25, continue straight on Central Avenue for the last quarter of a mile. This route is not signed. Milepost 0.00 is the junction with I-25/US 87 and US 85, I-25 Business/US 87 Business. The Wyoming Department of Fish and Game Headquarters is at Milepost 0.05, and the Wyoming Department of Transportation entrance is at Milepost 0.06. The main visitors parking area in the entrance is at Milepost 0.07, and other parking areas are at Milepost 0.09. The route ends at 0.12 miles (0.19 km) at F.E. Warren Air Force Base, which also provides golf course access.

== Major intersections ==
The entire route is in Cheyenne, Laramie County.

mi	km	Destinations	Notes
0.00	0.00	US 85 south / I-25 BL south / US 87 Bus. south (Central Avenue) to I-25 (US 87)	Eastern Terminus of WYO 224; Exit 12 (I-25 / US 87); Northern terminus of US 85 / I-25 Bus. /US 87 Bus.
0.12	0.19	WYDOT Headquarters	Western Terminus of WYO 224
1.000 mi = 1.609 km; 1.000 km = 0.621 mi
