= U.S. Route 18 in Wyoming =

Segment of American highway

U.S. Highway 18
- US 18 highlighted in red

Route information
- Maintained by WYDOT
- Length: 98.727 mi (158.886 km)

Major junctions
- West end: I-25 / US 20 / US 26 / US 87 at Orin
- US 20 / US 85 in Lusk; US 85 at Mule Creek Junction
- North end: US 18 at the South Dakota state line near Mule Creek Junction

Location
- Country: United States
- State: Wyoming
- Counties: Converse, Niobrara

Highway system
- United States Numbered Highway System; List; Special; Divided; Wyoming State Highway System; Interstate; US; State
← WYO 14	→ US 20

U.S. Route 18 (US 18) is an east-west U.S. Numbered Highway in the state of Wyoming. It extends approximately 99 miles (159 km) from Interstate 25 (I-25) at Orin to the South Dakota state line east of Mule Creek Junction. US 18 continues east to its terminus in Milwaukee, Wisconsin.

== Route description ==
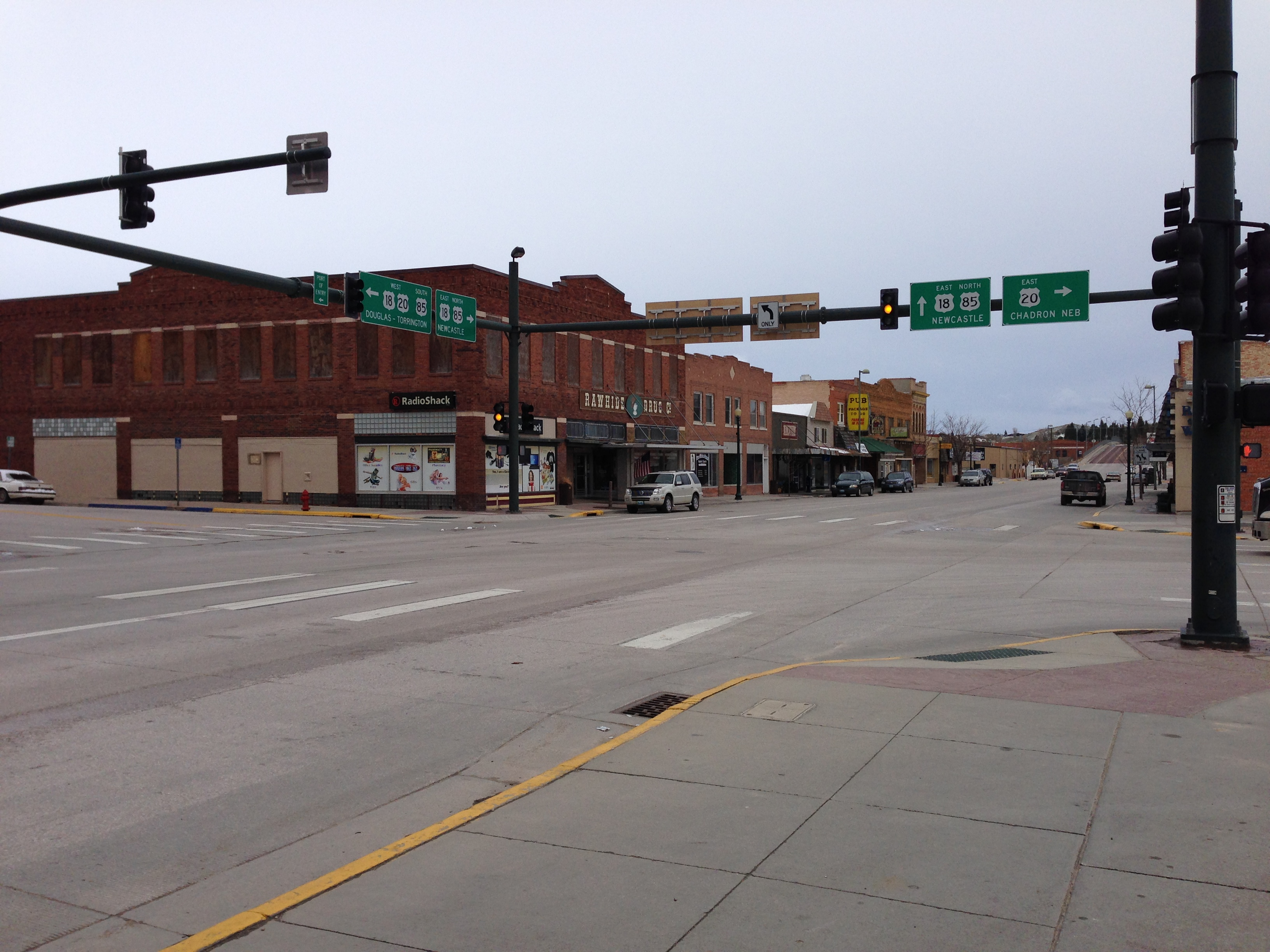
US 18, US 20, and US 85 in downtown Lusk.

US 18 begins in Orin concurrent with US 20 at I-25 (itself concurrent with US 20, US 26, and US 87) and travels 42 miles (68 km) east to Lusk, where US 18 branches off to run concurrently with US 85 for 47 miles (76 km). At the unincorporated community of Mule Creek Junction in northeastern Niobrara County, US 18 leaves US 85. This 10-mile (16 km) stretch from US 85 to the South Dakota border is the only segment of US 18 in Wyoming which is not cosigned with another highway. Running for nearly 100 miles (160 km), US 18 has a speed limit of 70 mph (110 km/h) with the exception of its ending terminus at Orin and the portion throughout Lusk.

== Major intersections ==
County	Location	mi	km	Destinations	Notes
Converse	Orin	0.000	0.000	I-25 / US 20 west / US 26 / US 87 – Glendo, Douglas	US 18 western terminus; western end of US 20 concurrency; I-25 exit 126
Converse		1.818	2.926	WYO 319 south	
Niobrara	Manville	32.705	52.634	WYO 270 – Manville, Lance Creek, Guernsey	
Niobrara		40.214	64.718	Lusk rest area	
Niobrara	Lusk	40.515	65.203	WYO 273 north	
Niobrara	Lusk	41.808	67.283	US 85 south (Cedar Street) – Torrington	Western end of US 85 concurrency
Niobrara	Lusk	42.304	68.082	US 20 east (3rd Street) – Chadron	Eastern end of US 20 concurrency
Niobrara		63.485	102.169	WYO 270 west – Lance Creek	
Niobrara	Mule Creek Junction	88.573	142.544	US 85 north – Newcastle	Eastern end of US 85 concurrency
Niobrara		98.727	158.886	US 18 east – Edgemont, Hot Springs	Continuation into South Dakota
1.000 mi = 1.609 km; 1.000 km = 0.621 mi: Concurrency terminus

== See also ==
U.S. Route 18
Previous state: Terminus	Wyoming	Next state: South Dakota
