= U.S. Route 18 =

Highway in the United States

U.S. Route 18
- US 18 highlighted in red

Route information
- Length: 1,046 mi (1,683 km)
- Existed: 1926–present

Major junctions
- West end: I-25 / US 20 / US 26 / US 87 at Orin, Wyoming
- I-29 near Worthing, South Dakota; I-35 / Iowa 27 at Clear Lake, Iowa; US 218 / Iowa 27 near Charles City, Iowa; I-39 / I-90 at Madison, Wisconsin; I-94 at Waukesha, Wisconsin; I-41 / US 41 / US 45 at Wauwatosa, Wisconsin; I-43 at Milwaukee, Wisconsin
- East end: Lincoln Memorial Drive in Milwaukee, Wisconsin

Location
- Country: United States
- States: Wyoming, South Dakota, Iowa, Wisconsin

Highway system
- United States Numbered Highway System; List; Special; Divided
← US 17	→ US 19

U.S. Highway 18 (US 18) is an east–west United States Numbered Highway in the Midwestern United States. The western terminus is in Orin, Wyoming, at an interchange with Interstate 25 (I-25). Its eastern terminus is in Downtown Milwaukee, Wisconsin. US 18, however, runs concurrent with other U.S. Highways from its western terminus to Mule Creek Junction, Wyoming. US 18 is one of the original U.S. Highways of 1926. The US 18 designation was originally proposed for a road in Michigan from Grand Haven east to Detroit. This roadway was eventually designated as US 16.

== Route description ==
Lengths
	mi	km
Wyoming	100	160
South Dakota	452	727
Iowa	312	502
Wisconsin	182	293
Total	1,046	1,683

=== Wyoming ===
In Wyoming, US 18 runs concurrent with US 20 from I-25 to Lusk, where US 18 branches off to run concurrently with US 85. At the unincorporated community of Mule Creek Junction in northeastern Niobrara County, US 18 leaves US 85. This 10-mile (16 km) stretch from US 85 to the South Dakota border is the only segment of US 18 in Wyoming which is not cosigned with another highway. Running for nearly 100 miles (160 km), US 18 has a speed limit of 70 mph (110 km/h) with the exception of its ending terminus at Orin and the portion throughout Lusk.

=== South Dakota ===
US 18 enters South Dakota west of Edgemont. It passes through Hot Springs, the Pine Ridge Indian Reservation, the Rosebud Indian Reservation, Winner, and Gregory before crossing the Missouri River near Pickstown over Fort Randall Dam. East of the Missouri River, US 18 passes through (or near) Lake Andes and Tripp before a brief concurrency with I-29 near Worthing. East of I-29, US 18 passes through Canton before crossing the Big Sioux River into Iowa.

The Oyate Trail is one of the names given (in the late 1990s) to the section of US 18 traveling across South Dakota from I-29 east of Vermillion to Maverick Junction.

Named in an attempt to encourage more tourism traffic through the lands of various Indigenous peoples in southern South Dakota, it passes through or near the Yankton Sioux, Rosebud, and Pine Ridge Indian reservations, crossing the James River Valley, the Missouri River near Fort Randall Dam, portions of Pine Ridge, and the High Plains of South Dakota, connecting the urban areas of the middle Missouri River with the Black Hills.

Portions of the road were known as the Grant Highway, Black Hills Sioux Trail, and part of the Omaha, Rosebud and Black Hills Highway, as well as the Custer Battlefield Trail.

Towns along the road include Gregory, Winner, Olivet, Mission, Martin, Batesland, and Pine Ridge. Nearby towns and locales of interest include Rosebud (capital of the Rosebud Sioux Tribe) and Wounded Knee.

The South Dakota section of US 18, other than the concurrency with I-29, is defined at South Dakota Codified Laws § 31-4-141.

=== Iowa ===
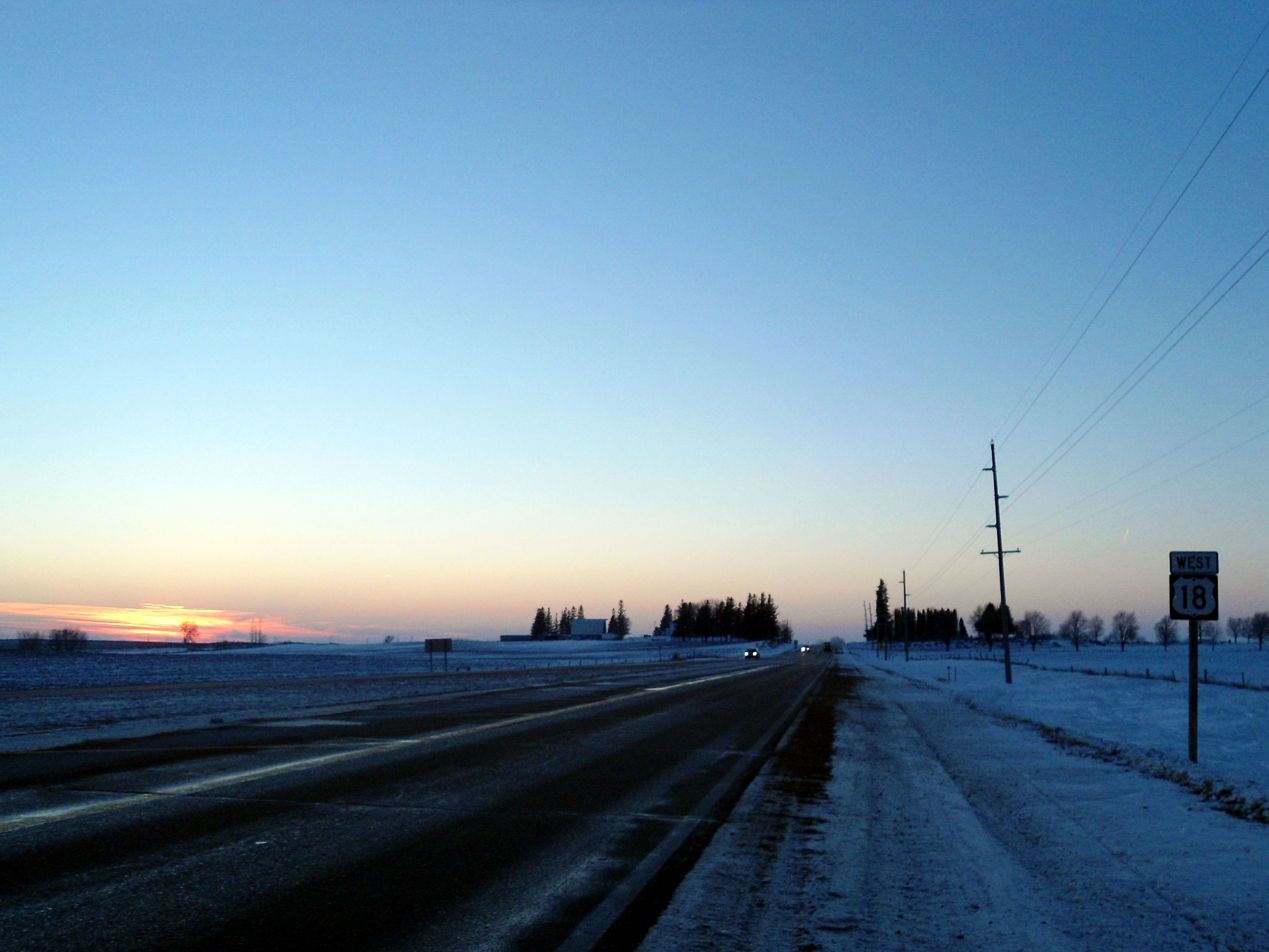
US 18 near Garner, Iowa.

US 18 enters Iowa via a Big Sioux River crossing northeast of Beloit. It overlaps US 75 for a mile (1.6 km) near Hull and US 59 for a mile (1.6 km) near Sanborn. It then overlaps US 71 through Spencer. US 18 passes through Emmetsburg before intersecting US 169 at Algona. US 18 then continues east through Garner before intersecting I-35 in Clear Lake. After a brief concurrency with I-35, US 18 continues as a freeway, bypassing Mason City to the south. At Charles City, US 18 becomes a rural two-lane highway again, except for a brief concurrency with the US 63 bypass of New Hampton. After passing through West Union, it turns northeast and joins US 52 at Postville, then leaving US 52 about seven miles (11 km) east of Monona before crossing the Mississippi River into Wisconsin via the Marquette–Joliet Bridge in the city of Marquette.

US 18 is the designated route of the Avenue of the Saints between Clear Lake and Charles City.

=== Wisconsin ===
Upon entry into Wisconsin at Prairie du Chien, US 18 is the terminus for State Trunk Highway 60 (WIS 60). The two routes are then concurrent until Bridgeport where WIS 60 splits off to the east and US 18 crosses the Wisconsin River and turns east on the other side. The route joins the US 151 expressway in Dodgeville and the two remain concurrent east to Madison. US 18 follows US 12 south of Madison and passes through or around Cambridge, Jefferson, and Waukesha before terminating in Milwaukee at the junction of East Michigan Street and Lincoln Memorial Drive in downtown.

== Major intersections ==
Wyoming
I-25 / US 20 / US 26 / US 87 in Orin. US 18/US 20 travel concurrently to Lusk.
US 85 in Lusk. The highways travel concurrently to the northeastern part of Niobrara County.
South Dakota
US 385 in Hot Springs. The highways travel concurrently to Oelrichs.
US 83 west of Mission. The highways travel concurrently to Mission.
US 183 southeast of Witten. The highways travel concurrently to Colome.
US 281 east-southeast of Fairfax. The highways travel concurrently to south of Armour.
US 81 east of Menno
I-29 south-southwest of Worthing. The highways travel concurrently for approximately 3.02 miles (4.86 km).
Iowa
US 75 in Lincoln Township. The highways travel concurrently through the township.
US 59 in Sanborn. The highways travel concurrently to Franklin Township.
US 71 in Spencer. The highways travel concurrently through the city.
US 169 in Algona
US 69 in Garfield Township. The highways travel concurrently to Garner.
I-35 in Clear Lake. The highways travel concurrently to Lake Township.
US 65 in Mason City
US 218 in Floyd. The highways travel concurrently to Charles City.
US 63 in New Hampton. The highways travel concurrently to Dresden Township.
US 52 in Post Township. The highways travel concurrently to Giard Township.
Wisconsin
US 61 in Fennimore. The highways travel concurrently through the city.
US 151 east of Dodgeville. The highways travel concurrently to Madison.
US 12 / US 14 in Madison. US 12/US 18 travel concurrently to Cambridge. US 14/US 18 travel concurrently through Madison.
US 51 in Madison
I-39 / I-90 in Madison
I-94 northeast of Waukesha
I-41 / US 41 / US 45 in Wauwatosa. A southbound entrance allows access to I-894.
Michigan Street/Lincoln Memorial Drive in Milwaukee

== See also ==
- Special routes of U.S. Route 18
- U.S. Route 118
- U.S. Route 218

Browse numbered routes
← US 16	WY	→ US 20
← SD 17	SD	→ SD 19
← Iowa 17	IA	→ US 20
← WIS 17	WI	→ WIS 19
