= Wyoming Highway 254 =

Highway in Wyoming

Wyoming Highway 254
- Salt Creek Highway
- WYO 254 highlighted in red

Route information
- Maintained by WYDOT
- Length: 4.06 mi (6.53 km)

Major junctions
- South end: US 20 Bus. / US 26 Bus. in Mills
- North end: I-25 / US 87 in Bar Nunn

Location
- Country: United States
- State: Wyoming
- Counties: Natrona

Highway system
- Wyoming State Highway System; Interstate; US; State
← WYO 253	→ WYO 255
← US 85	→ US 89

Wyoming Highway 254 (WYO 254) is a 4.06-mile-long (6.53 km) state road northwest of Casper, Wyoming known as Salt Creek Highway.

== Route description ==
Wyoming Highway 254 begins its south end the town of Mills, just outside Casper at US 20 Business/US 26 Business (Yellowstone Highway). The highway continues north into the town of Bar Nunn at 0.79 miles (located northwest of Casper). Highway 254 intersects US 20/US 26 (Casper Bypass) at 1.40 miles (2.25 km). WYO 254 continues north until 3.9 miles (6.3 km), where it turns east onto Wardwell Road for a short distance and there meets I-25/US 87 (exit 191), where WYO 254 ends.

== History ==
Wyoming Highway 254 is the former alignment of US 87 prior to relocation along I-25.

== Major intersections ==
The entire route is in Natrona County.

Location	mi	km	Destinations	Notes
Mills	0.00	0.00	US 20 Bus. / US 26 Bus.	Southern terminus
Bar Nunn	1.40	2.25	US 20 / US 26 – Shoshoni, Sheridan	Interchange
Bar Nunn	4.06	6.53	I-25 / US 87 – Casper, Midwest	Northern terminus; exit 191 on I-25; road continues east as Howard Street
1.000 mi = 1.609 km; 1.000 km = 0.621 mi
