= U.S. Route 26 in Wyoming =

Segment of American highway

U.S. Highway 26
- US 26 highlighted in red

Route information
- Maintained by WYDOT
- Length: 475.050 mi (764.519 km)
- Restrictions: Intermittent closures during winter

Major junctions
- West end: US 26 at the Idaho state line in Alpine
- US 89 from Alpine to Moran; US 189 from Hoback to Jackson; US 191 from Hoback to Moran; US 287 from Moran to Morton; US 20 from Shoshoni to Orin; I-25 / US 87 from Casper to Dwyer; US 18 at Orin; US 85 from Lingle to Torrington
- East end: US 26 at the Nebraska state line in Henry, NE

Location
- Country: United States
- State: Wyoming
- Counties: Lincoln, Teton, Fremont, Natrona, Converse, Platte, Goshen

Highway system
- United States Numbered Highway System; List; Special; Divided; Wyoming State Highway System; Interstate; US; State
← I-25	→ WYO 26

U.S. Highway 26 (US 26) is part of the United States Numbered Highway System that runs from Seaside, Oregon, to Ogallala, Nebraska. Within the state of Wyoming, it runs 475 miles (764 km) from the Idaho state line northwest of Alpine, to the Nebraska state line southeast of Torrington.

== Route description ==
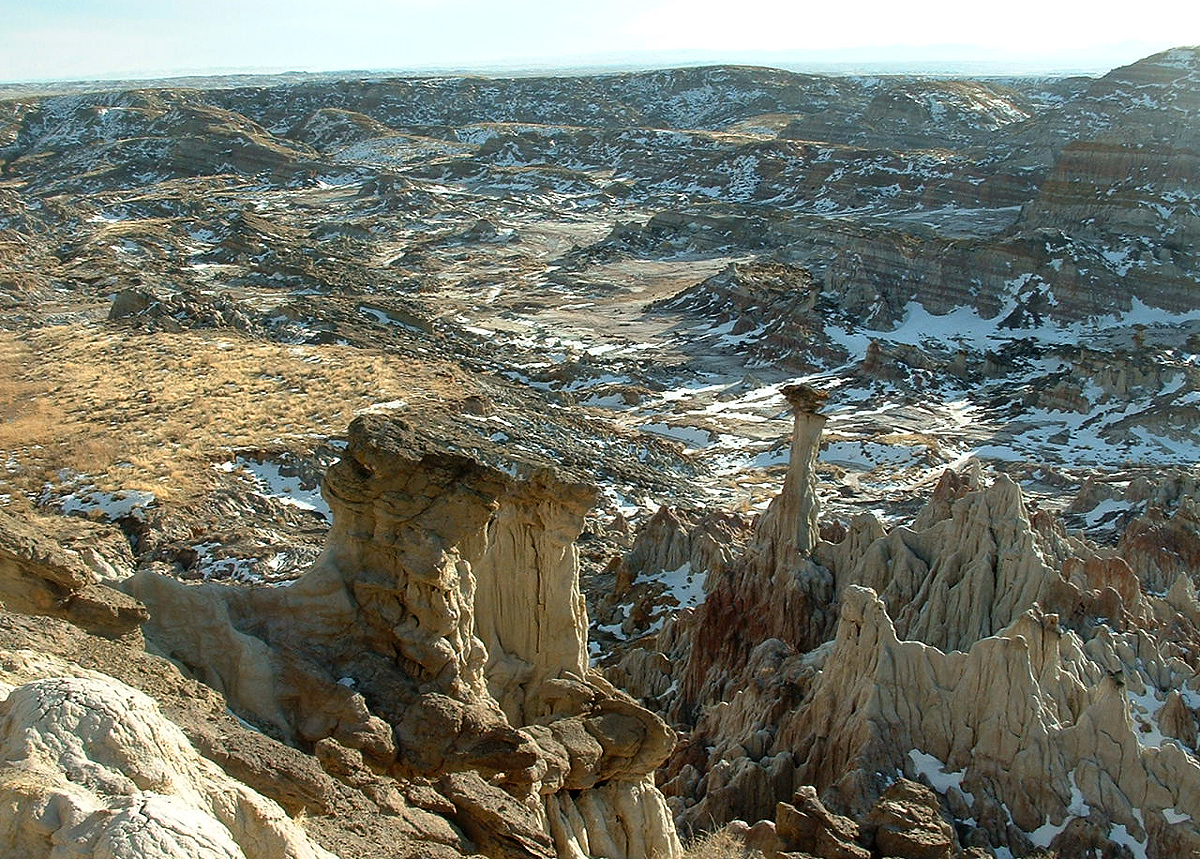
US 20/US 26 at the entrance to Hell's Half Acre

US 26 enters Lincoln County from Idaho and intersects US 89 just outside Alpine, where the two routes run concurrenly for 23 miles (37 km), crossing into Teton County and intersecting US 189 and US 191 at Hoback Junction. The four routes are then cosigned for 14 miles (23 km) to Jackson, where US 189 ends in Jackson and the other three highways continue their concurrency for 30 miles (48 km) through Grand Teton National Park up to Moran. At Glacier View Turnout, a view of Teton Glacier, on the north of Grand Teton, can be seen. At Moran, the routes meet US 287 where US 89, US 191, and US 287 continue north to Yellowstone National Park; however, US 26 turns east and begins its 99-mile (159 km) concurrency with US 287. Crossing the Continental Divide at Togwotee Pass and entering Fremont County, US 26 and US 287 pass through Dubois, the end of the Wyoming Centennial Scenic Byway, before US 26 and US 287 separate at Diversion Dam Junction, about 10 miles (16 km) west of Morton.

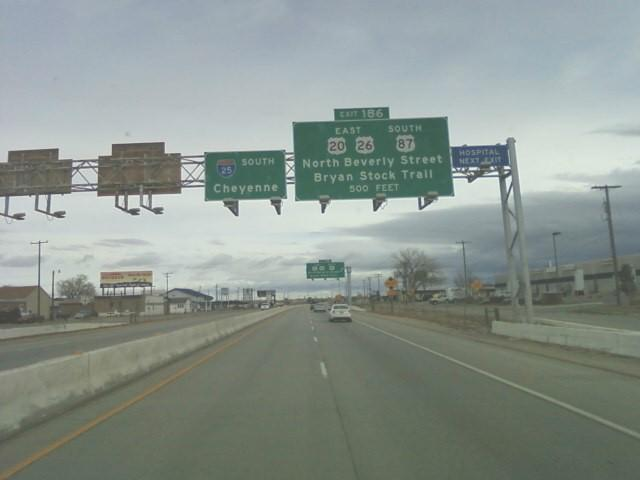
US 20, US 26, and US 87 exiting I-25 in Casper

US 26 continues to Riverton where it meets Wyoming Highway 789 (WYO 789), where the two routes are cosigned for 22 miles (35 km) to Shoshoni, where WYO 789 departs and US 26 begins its 161-mile (259 km) concurrency with US 20. The two routes travel continue to Casper, where they follow a bypass north of Casper, the eastern half of which is concurrent with Interstate 25 (I-25) and US 87 for three miles (4.8 km). US 20, US 26, and US 87 parallel I-25 for 27 miles (43 km) from Casper to Glenrock; east of Glenrock, US 26 (along with US 20 and US 87) is cosigned on I-25 for 69 miles (111 km). At Dwyer Junction, US 26 departs I-25, where it turns east to continue along the Old Oregon Trail. US 26 passes through Guernsey, Fort Laramie, Lingle, and Torrington before entering Nebraska. US 85 is concurrent with US 26 for 10 miles (16 km) between Lingle and Torrington.

== Major intersections ==
County	Location	mi	km	Exit	Destinations	Notes
Lincoln	Alpine Northwest	0.000	0.000		US 26 west – Idaho Falls	Continuation into Idaho
Lincoln	Alpine	2.370	3.814		US 89 south – Alpine, Afton, Salt Lake	Western end of US 89 concurrency
Teton	Hoback	25.358	40.810		US 189 south / US 191 south / Wyoming Centennial Scenic Byway – Pinedale	Western end of US 189/US 191/ Wyoming Centennial Scenic Byway concurrency; Hoback Junction
Teton	Hoback	29.298	47.151		WYO 391 east (East Evans Road)	
Teton	Jackson	37.093	59.695		WYO 22 west – Wilson, Teton Village	
Teton	Jackson	38.918	62.632		US 189 ends / Broadway Avenue / Cache Street	Eastern end of US 189 concurrency; US 189 northern terminus
Teton	Grand Teton National Park	42.866	68.986		Grand Teton National Park boundary	
Teton	Grand Teton National Park	68.629	110.448		Teton Park Road – Visitor Center	To Moose–Wilson Road
Teton	Grand Teton National Park	68.629	110.448		US 89 north / US 191 north / US 287 north – Yellowstone	Eastern end of US 89/US 191 concurrency; western end of US 287 concurrency
Teton	Grand Teton National Park	70.833	113.995		Grand Teton National Park boundary	
Teton		94.266	151.706		Togwotee Pass (Continental Divide)	
Fremont	Dubois	124.400	200.202		Wyoming Centennial Scenic Byway ends	Eastern end of Wyoming Centennial Scenic Byway concurrency; Wyoming Centennial Scenic Byway northern terminus
Fremont		165.279	265.991		Diversion Dam Rest Area	
Fremont	Diversion Dam Junction	167.631	269.776		US 287 south – Lander	Eastern end of US 287 concurrency
Fremont		182.436	293.602		WYO 132 south / WYO 133 north – Ethete, Pavillion	
Fremont	Riverton	201.526	324.325		WYO 789 south – Hudson, Lander	Western end of WYO 789 concurrency
Fremont		215.110	346.186		WYO 134 west – Pavillion	
Fremont	Shoshoni	223.369	359.478		US 20 west / WYO 789 north – Thermopolis, Boysen State Park, Hot Springs State Park	Easternn end of WYO 789 concurency; western end of US 20 concurrency
Natrona		270.197	434.840		Waltman Rest Area	
Natrona	Mountain View	317.363	510.746		WYO 257 south to WYO 220 – Rawlins US 20 Bus. east / US 26 Bus. east – Casper	US 20 Bus./US 26 Bus. western terminus
Natrona	Mills	319.429	514.071		WYO 254 (Salt Creek Highway) – Casper Port of Entry	
Natrona	Casper	320.242	515.380	189	I-25 north / US 87 north / Events Drive – Sheridan	Western end of I-25/US 87 concurency; exit numbers follow I-25
Natrona	Casper	321.149	516.839	188B	Poplar Street (WYO 220 south)	
Natrona	Casper	321.608	517.578	188A	I-25 BL south / US 87 Bus. south / Center Street (WYO 255 south)	No northbound entrance; I-25 BL/US 87 Bus. northern terminus
Natrona	Casper	322.266	518.637	187	McKinley Street	
Natrona	Casper	323.008– 323.341	519.831– 520.367	186	I-25 south – Cheyenne I-25 BL north / US 20 Bus. west / US 26 Bus. west / US 87 Bus. north (Yellowstone Street) / North Beverly Street / Bryan Stock Trail	Eastern end of I-25 concurency; I-25 BL/US 87 Bus. southern terminus; US 20 Bus./US 26 Bus. eastern terminus
Natrona	Evansville	324.357	522.002		WYO 258 south (Curtis Street) to I-25	
Natrona	Evansville	324.357	522.002		WYO 256 north (Cole Creek Road) / WYO 253 south (Hat Six Road) to I-25	
Converse	Glenrock	345.014	555.246		WYO 95 north – Rolling Hills	
Converse	Glenrock	345.533	556.081		I-25 BL north / WYO 95 south (4th Street) to I-25	Western end of I-25 BL concurrency
Converse		349.180	561.951		WYO 90 south (Boxelder Road)	
Converse		350.364	563.856	160	I-25 north / I-25 BL ends – Casper	Eastern end of I-25 BL concurrency; western end of I-25 concurrency; exit numbers follow I-25
Converse		355.057	571.409	156	Bixby Road	
Converse		356.991	574.521	154	Barber Road	
Converse		360.069	579.475	151	Ayres Natural Bridge	
Converse		351.793	566.156	150	Inez Road	
Converse		365.232	587.784	146	WYO 96 east (La Prele Road)	
Converse	Douglas	371.134	597.282	140	I-25 BL south / US 20 Bus. east / US 26 Bus. east / US 87 Bus. south to WYO 59 – Douglas, Gillette	
Converse	Douglas	375.763	604.732	135	I-25 BL north / US 20 Bus. west / US 26 Bus. west / US 87 Bus. north – Douglas	
Converse	Orin	384.768	619.224	126	US 18 east / US 20 east – Lusk	Eastern end of US 20 concurrency; US 18 western terminus
Converse	Orin	384.768	619.224	Orin Rest Area		
Platte	Glendo	399.560	643.029	111	Glendo (WYO 319 Spur)	
Platte		407.192	655.312	104	Middle Bear	
Platte		411.110	661.617	100	Cassa Road (WYO 319 north)	
Platte		416.410	670.147	94	El Rancho Road	
Platte	Dwyer Junction	418.864	674.096	92	I-25 south / US 87 south – Cheyenne	Eastern end of I-25/ US 87 concurrency
Platte	Dwyer Junction	418.864	674.096	Dwyer Junction Rest Area		
Platte		421.464	678.281		WYO 320 south	
Platte	Guernsey	433.281	697.298		WYO 317 north – Guernsey State Park	
Platte	Guernsey	435.413	700.729		WYO 270 north – Hartville, Manville	
Platte		436.664	702.743		Guernsey Rest Area	
Goshen	Fort Laramie	446.731	718.944		WYO 160 west – Fort Laramie National Historic Site	
Goshen		451.441	726.524		WYO 157 south	
Goshen	Lingle	457.142	735.699		US 85 south – Lusk	Western end of US 85 concurrency
Goshen	Lingle	457.349	736.032		WYO 156 south	
Goshen	Torrington	466.736	751.139		WYO 159 north (West C Street)	
Goshen	Torrington	467.004	751.570		US 85 Bus. south / WYO 92 south (Main Street)	
Goshen	Torrington	467.400	752.207		US 85 south – Cheyenne	Eastern end of US 85 concurrency
Goshen		475.050	764.519		US 26 east – Scottsbluff	Continuation into Nebraska
1.000 mi = 1.609 km; 1.000 km = 0.621 mi: Concurrency terminus; Incomplete access

== Related routes ==
- U.S. Route 26 Business (Casper, Wyoming)
- U.S. Route 26 Bypass (Mountain View–Casper, Wyoming)
- U.S. Route 26 Business (Douglas, Wyoming)
- U.S. Route 26 Bypass (Manville, Wyoming)

== See also ==
U.S. Route 26
Previous state: Idaho	Wyoming	Next state: Nebraska
