= Wyoming Highway 223 =

State highway in Wyoming, United States

Wyoming Highway 223
- Terry Ranch Road
- WYO 223 highlighted in red

Route information
- Maintained by WYDOT
- Length: 5.69 mi (9.16 km)

Major junctions
- West end: I-25 / US 87 southwest of Cheyenne
- East end: US 85 south of Cheyenne

Location
- Country: United States
- State: Wyoming
- Counties: Laramie

Highway system
- Wyoming State Highway System; Interstate; US; State
← WYO 222	→ WYO 224
← US 87	→ US 89

Wyoming Highway 223 (WYO 223) is a 5.69-mile-long (9.16 km) east–west state highway known as Terry Ranch Road in extreme southern Laramie County south of Cheyenne in the southeastern part of the U.S. state of Wyoming. The highway is the former routing of U.S. Route 87 before it was relocated onto Interstate 25.

== Route description ==
Wyoming Highway 223 starts its western end at exit 2 of Interstate 25/U.S. Route 87 southwest of Cheyenne, approximately 2 miles from the Colorado State Line. Highway 223 exits onto an I-25 frontage road but quickly turns left onto Terry Ranch Road and travels to its eastern end at US 85 (South Greeley Highway). WYO 223 serves as a connector between the I-25 and US 85 and serves the residential areas near its eastern end at US 85. Westbound, this route is also signed as "To Interstate 25."

== History ==
Wyoming Highway 223 was once part of the original routing of US 87 south of Cheyenne. US 87 entered from Colorado and followed present day WYO 223 prior to its realignment along Interstate 25. US 87 then met with US 85, at Highway 223's eastern terminus, to head north into Cheyenne.

== Major intersections ==
The entire route is in Cheyenne, Laramie County.

mi	km	Destinations	Notes
0.00	0.00	I-25 / US 87	Western Terminus of WYO 223; Exit 2 (I-25/US 87)
5.69	9.16	US 85 (South Greeley Highway)	Eastern Terminus of WYO 223
1.000 mi = 1.609 km; 1.000 km = 0.621 mi
