= Special routes of U.S. Route 26 =

Special routes of U.S. Route 26

Highway system
- United States Numbered Highway System; List; Special; Divided

Several special routes of U.S. Route 26 (US 26) exist. In order from west to east, they are as follows.

== Idaho ==
=== Ririe business loop ===
U.S. Highway 26 Business
- Location: Ririe
- Length: 2.981 mi (4.797 km)

U.S. Highway 26 Business (US-26 Bus.) is a 2.981-mile-long (4.797 km) business route in and around the small town of Ririe northeast of Idaho Falls. It connects US-26 to the community as well as SH-48.

Major intersections

County	Location	mi	km	Destinations	Notes
Bonneville		0.000	0.000	US 26 (East Ririe Highway) / North 115th East – Idaho Falls, Pocatello, Swan Valley	Western terminus of US 26 Bus.; continues as North 115th East beyond US 26
Bonneville–Jefferson county line	Ririe	1.891	3.043	SH-48 west (East County Line Road) – Rigby	Eastern terminus of SH-48
Bonneville		2.981	4.797	US 26 – Idaho Falls, Swan Valley, Jackson	Eastern terminus
1.000 mi = 1.609 km; 1.000 km = 0.621 mi

== Wyoming ==
=== Casper business loop ===
U.S. Highway 26 Business
- Location: Casper, Wyoming
- Length: 6.112 mi (9.836 km)

U.S. Highway 20 Business
- Location: Casper, Wyoming
- Length: 6.112 mi (9.836 km)

U.S. Route 26 Business and U.S. Route 20 Business in the Casper, Wyoming area is a concurrent business spur that goes from the intersection of US 20, US 26, and SR 257 in Mountain View to I-25 in Casper, following 1st Street and Yellowstone Street. It is also partially concurrent with I-25 Business and US 87 Business.

Major intersections

The entire route is in Natrona County.

Location	mi	km	Destinations	Notes
Mountain View	0.000	0.000	US 20 west / US 26 west – Shoshoni US 20 east / US 26 east to I-25 / US 87 – Sheridan, Cheyenne WYO 257 south to WYO 220 – Rawlins	US 20 Bus. / US 26 Bus. western terminus
Mills	1.534	2.469	WYO 258 south (Wyoming Boulevard) to WYO 220 / Hudson Street – Rawlins	
Mills	2.661	4.282	WYO 254 north (Salt Creek Highway)	
Casper	3.715	5.979	WYO 220 (Poplar Street) to I-25	
Casper	4.352	7.004	Center Street (WYO 255 north) / I-25 BL north / US 87 Bus. north to I-25	West end of I-25 BL / US 87 Bus. overlap; WYO 255 is unsigned
Casper	4.418– 4.490	7.110– 7.226	Wolcott Street / Durbin Street (WYO 251 south)	One-way pair
Casper	6.062– 6.112	9.756– 9.836	I-25 / US 20 west / US 26 west / US 87 north / Beverly Street – Cheyenne US 20 east / US 26 east / US 87 south / I-25 BL ends / US 87 Bus. ends (Yellowstone Highway)	I-25 exit 186; US 20 Bus. / US 26 Bus. eastern terminus; I-25 BL / US 87 Bus. southern terminus; road continues east as US 20 / US 26 / US 87
1.000 mi = 1.609 km; 1.000 km = 0.621 mi: Concurrency terminus

=== Mountain View–Casper bypass route ===
U.S. Highway 26 Bypass
- Location: Mountain View–Casper, Wyoming

U.S. Highway 20 Bypass
- Location: Mountain View–Casper, Wyoming

=== Manville bypass route ===
U.S. Highway 26 Bypass
- Location: Manville, Wyoming

U.S. Highway 20 Bypass
- Location: Manville, Wyoming

== Nebraska ==
=== Scottsbluff city route ===
U.S. Highway 26 City
- Location: Scottsbluff

=== U.S. Route 26N ===
U.S. Highway 26N
- Location: Bayard–Broadwater
- Existed: 1936–1959

U.S. Route 26N (US 26N) existed from 1939 to 1959. It went east along today's L-62A, then south along today's US-385 to just north of Bridgeport and east along today's US‑26 to Broadwater. In those years, the mainline of US‑26 between Bridgeport and Broadwater went on the south side of the North Platte River, along today's N-92.

== See also ==
- List of special routes of the United States Numbered Highway System
