= U.S. Route 20 in Wyoming =

Segment of American highway

U.S. Highway 20
- US 20 highlighted in red, with its unofficial segment through Yellowstone National Park highlighted in blue

Route information
- Maintained by WYDOT
- Length: 434.003 mi (698.460 km)
- Restrictions: Intermittent closures during winter

Major junctions
- West end: Eastern entrance of Yellowstone National Park
- US 14A at Cody; US 14 at Greybull; US 16 at Worland; US 26 from Shoshoni to Orin; I-25 / US 87 from Casper to Orin; US 18 from Orin to Lusk; US 85 at Lusk
- East end: US 20 at the Nebraska state line in Van Tassell

Location
- Country: United States
- State: Wyoming
- Counties: Park, Big Horn, Washakie, Hot Springs, Fremont, Natrona, Converse, Niobrara

Highway system
- United States Numbered Highway System; List; Special; Divided; Wyoming State Highway System; Interstate; US; State
← US 18	→ WYO 22

U.S. Highway 20 (US 20) is an east–west highway in the state of Wyoming. The eastern segment of US 20 in the state starts at the eastern entrance to Yellowstone National Park along with the western terminuses of US 14 and US 16. US 14/US 16/US 20 runs east to Greybull, where US 14 continues east and US 16/US 20 turns south; at Worland, US 16 turns east while US 20 continues south, passing through Wind River Canyon south of Thermopolis. US 20 joins US 26 in Shoshoni, where it turns east and continues all the way through Casper. From Casper, US 20/US 26 parallels Interstate 25 (I-25) and US 87 for 26 miles (42 km), until all four link up together just southeast of Glenrock. I-25/US 20/US 26/US 87 stays combined to Orin, where US 20 turns east from I-25, at the western end of US 18. US 18/US 20 run concurrently from Orin to Lusk, where US 18 turns north and US 20 continues east into Nebraska.

== Route description ==
=== Yellowstone National Park ===
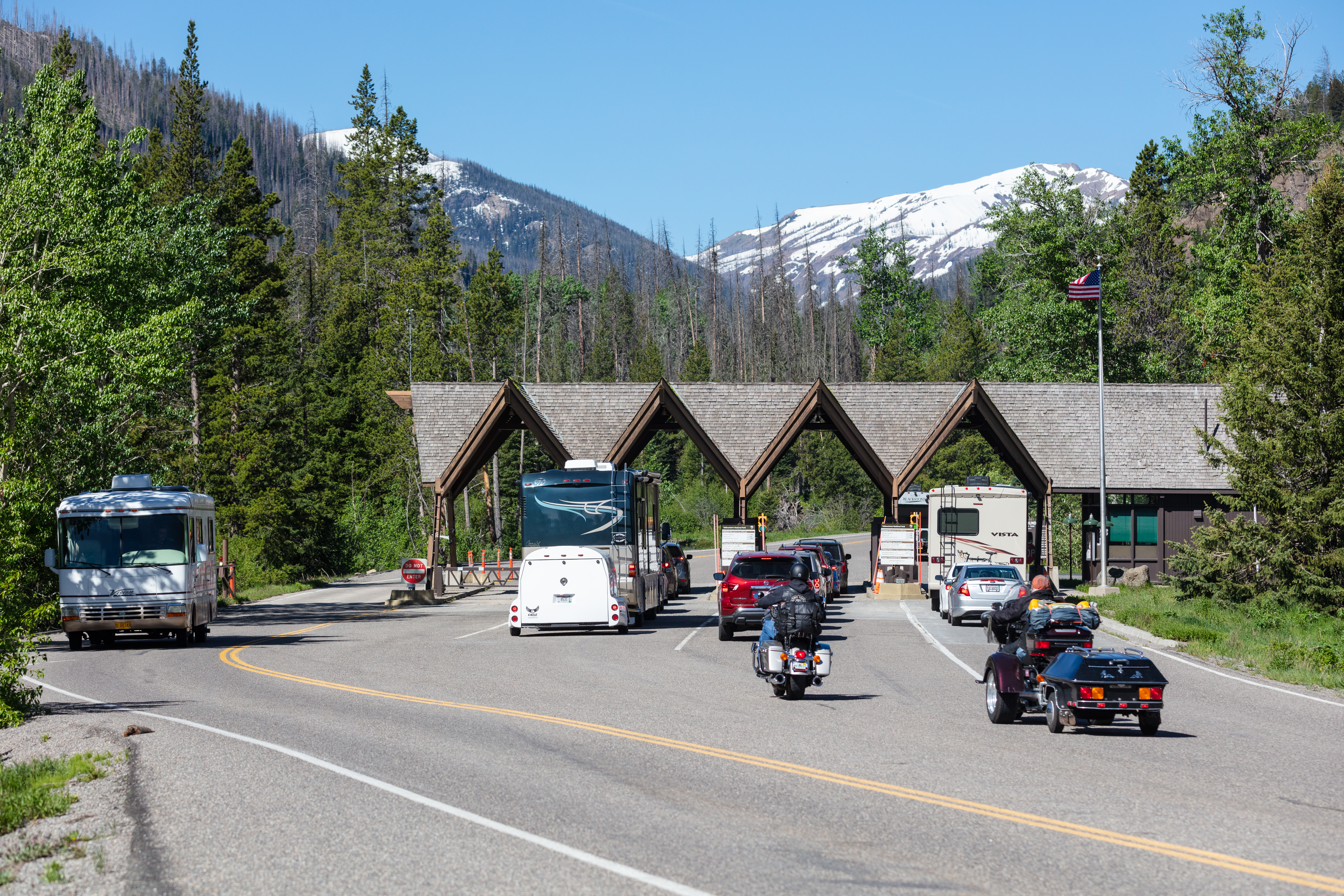
US 14, US 16, and US 20 at the East Entrance of Yellowstone Park

Google Maps and other mapmakers may show US 20 and other U.S. Highways going through Yellowstone National Park; however, they are officially discontinuous and unsigned inside the park.

Unofficially, Google Maps marks the start of the western part of US 20, along with US 191 and US 287, at the state line near West Yellowstone, Montana. The road parallels the Madison River until a junction with US 89. The three routes then turn south along US 89 (Grand Loop Road), paralleling the Firehole River. Past Old Faithful, the four routes curve east before reaching the West Thumb of Yellowstone Lake. While the rest of the routes turn south, US 20 travels northeast along the lake. US 20 even leaves the Grand Loop Road at an intersection midway along the lake. This intersection also marks the western "terminuses" of US 14 and US 16. US 20 travels through for 65.8 miles (105.9 km) by the time it exits the park.

=== Yellowstone–Nebraska state line ===
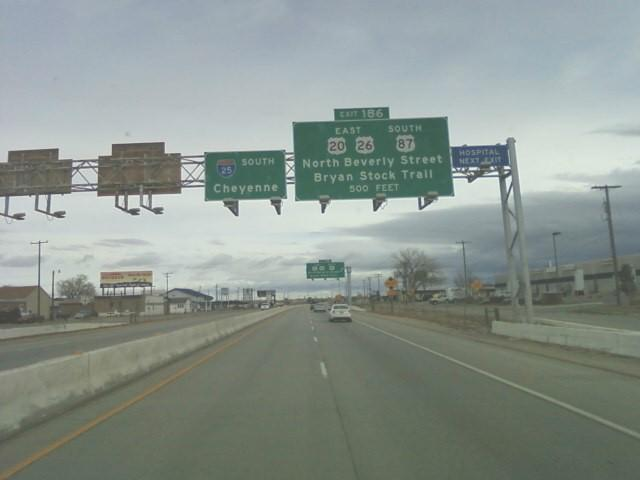
US 20, US 26, and US 87 exiting I-25 in Casper

The eastern section of US 20 begins at the east entrance of Yellowstone National Park. US 20, along with US 14 and US 16, then meanders east along the Shoshone River, heading toward Wapiti, Buffalo Bill Reservoir, and Cody. US 14A begins at Cody and continues to follow the river, while the three head straight to Greybull. Before Greybull, however, Wyoming Highway 789 (WYO 789) joins the concurrency. At Greybull, US 14 leaves the concurrency. At this point, the concurrency parallels the Bighorn River. In Worland, US 16 turns east and leaves the concurrency. South of the Boysen Dam, the road runs along the eastern front of the Boysen Reservoir. In Shoshoni, US 20 turns east along US 26, while WYO 789 turns west along the same route.

As US 20 and US 26 head toward Casper, the two routes travel along a limited-access road before traveling east along I-25 and US 87. US 20, US 26, and US 87 exit onto Beverly Street (exit 186) and travel east along Yellowstone Highway. Before reaching Glenrock, the three U.S. Highways are sandwiched between the North Platte River to the north and I-25 to the south. The three routes rejoins the interstate after Glenrock. US 20 leaves the freeway at Orin; this interchange is also where US 18 begins eastward. US 87 briefly joins the concurrency before US 20 turns east away from US 18/US 85. After passing through Van Tassell, US 20 crosses the Nebraska state line.

== History ==
US 20 became a U.S. Highway in 1926. Prior to 1940, it ended at Yellowstone National Park. In 1940, it was extended westward to Albany, Oregon; however, as U.S. Highways are not formally designated in national parks such as Yellowstone, US 20 can be thought of as made up of two parts broken by Yellowstone National Park.

== Major intersections ==
County	Location	mi	km	Exit	Destinations	Notes
Park	Yellowstone National Park	0.000	0.000		East Entrance Road (to US 20 west)	Continuation into Yellowstone National Park; US 20 resumes in Montana at the park's west entrance
Park	Yellowstone National Park	0.000	0.000	Yellowstone National Park boundary (East Entrance); fees required		
Park	Yellowstone National Park	0.000	0.000		US 14 begins / US 16 begins / Buffalo Bill Cody Scenic Byway begins	US 14 / US 16 western terminus; west end of US 14 / US 16 / Buffalo Bill Cody Scenic Byway concurrency
Park	Pahaska Tepee	2.000	3.219	Westbound road closure gate (closed winters)		
Park	Cody	49.410	79.518		WYO 291 south (South Fork Road)	
Park	Cody	50.900	81.916		US 14A east / WYO 120 west (16th Street) / Buffalo Bill Cody Scenic Byway ends – Powell, Big Horn Natl Rec Area	West end of WYO 120 and Buffalo Bill Cody Scenic Byway concurrency
Park	Cody	54.119	87.096		WYO 120 south – Meeteetse, Thermopolis	East end of WYO 120 concurrency
Big Horn		85.056	136.884		WYO 30 south – Burlington	
Big Horn	Emblem	85.665	137.864		WYO 32 north – Powell, Lowell	
Big Horn		99.197	159.642		US 310 west / WYO 789 north – Lovell	West end of WYO 789 concurrency
Big Horn	Greybull	104.176	167.655		US 14 east – Shell, Sheridan	East end of US 14 concurrency
Big Horn		109.910	176.883		WYO 36 south (Golf Course Road)	
Big Horn	Basin	112.765	181.478		WYO 30 west (C Street) – Burlington	
Big Horn		123.215	198.295		WYO 433 south	
Big Horn	Manderson	123.782	199.208		WYO 31 Spur east – Manderson, Hyattville	Officially WYO 31 Spur; signed as WYO 31
Big Horn	Manderson	124.386	200.180		WYO 31 east	Unsigned
Washakie	Worland	143.029	230.183		US 16 east (Big Horn Avenue) – Buffalo	Eastern end of US 16 concurrency; access to Washakie Medical Center
Washakie	Worland	143.353	230.704		To WYO 432 (Railroad Ave)	
Washakie	Worland	144.015	231.770		WYO 433 north (West River Road)	
Washakie		151.982	244.591		WYO 431 west / WYO 432 east	
Hot Springs		164.032	263.984		WYO 175 east – Kirby	
Hot Springs		168.825	271.698		WYO 172 east (Black Mountain Road)	
Hot Springs	Thermopolis	176.083	283.378		WYO 120 (Broadway Street) – Meeteetse, Cody, Wyoming Dinosaur Center	Access to Hot Springs Memorial Hospital
Hot Springs		178.727	287.633		WYO 173 south (Buffalo Creek Road)	
Hot Springs		180.991	291.277		Eastbound road closure gate (weather depending)	
Fremont		205.123	330.113		Westbound road closure gate (weather depending)	
Fremont	Shoshoni	208.495	335.540		US 26 west / WYO 789 south – Riverton	East end of WYO 789 concurrency; west end of US 26 concurrency
Fremont	Shoshoni	209.053	336.438		Eastbound road closure gate (weather depending)	
Fremont	Moneta	229.753	369.752		Eastbound road closure gate (weather depending)	
Natrona		255.323	410.903		Waltman rest area	
Natrona		295.633	475.775		Westbound road closure gate (weather depending)	
Natrona	Mountain View	302.481	486.796		WYO 257 south to WYO 220 – Rawlins US 20 Bus. east / US 26 Bus. east – Casper	US 20 Bus. / US 26 Bus. western terminus
Natrona	Mills	304.547	490.121		WYO 254 (Salt Creek Highway) – Casper Point of Entry	
Natrona	Casper	305.360	491.429	189	I-25 north / US 87 north – Sheridan	West end of I-25 / US 87 concurrency
Natrona	Casper	306.267	492.889	188B	Poplar Street (WYO 220 west)	
Natrona	Casper	306.682	493.557	188A	I-25 BL south / US 87 Bus. south / Center Street (WYO 255 south)	No northbound entrance; I-25 BL / US 87 Bus. western terminus; WYO 255 unsigned
Natrona	Casper	309.340	497.834	187	McKinley Street	
Natrona	Casper	308.082– 308.415	495.810– 496.346	186	I-25 south – Cheyenne I-25 BL north / US 20 Bus. west / US 26 Bus. west / US 87 Bus. north (Yellowstone Street) / North Beverly Street / Bryan Stock Trail	East end of I-25 concurrency; I-25 BL / US 87 Bus. southern terminus; US 20 Bus. / US 26 Bus. eastern terminus
Natrona	Evansville	309.431	497.981		WYO 258 south (Curtis Street) to I-25	
Natrona	Evansville	312.244	502.508		WYO 256 north (Cole Creek Road) / WYO 253 south (Hat Six Road) to I-25	
Converse	Glenrock	330.088	531.225		WYO 95 north – Rolling Hills	
Converse	Glenrock	330.607	532.060		I-25 BL north / WYO 95 south (4th Street) to I-25	West end of I-25 BL concurrency
Converse		334.254	537.930		WYO 90 south (Boxelder Road)	
Converse		335.188	539.433		I-25 road closure gate (weather depending)	
Converse		335.438	539.835	160	I-25 north / I-25 BL ends – Casper	West end of I-25 concurrency; east end of I-25 BL concurrency
Converse		340.130	547.386	156	Bixby Road	
Converse		342.071	550.510	154	Barber Road	
Converse		345.142	555.452	151	Ayres Natural Bridge	
Converse		345.866	556.617	150	Inez Road	
Converse		350.305	563.761	146	WYO 96 east (La Prele Road)	
Converse	Douglas	356.207	573.260	140	I-25 BL south / US 20 Bus. east / US 26 Bus. east / US 87 Bus. south to WYO 59 – Douglas, Gillette	
Converse	Douglas	360.836	580.709	135	I-25 BL north / US 20 Bus. west / US 26 Bus. west / US 87 Bus. north – Douglas	
Converse	Orin	369.841	595.201	126	I-25 south / US 26 east / US 87 south / US 18 begins – Glendo	East end of I-25 / US 26 / US 87 concurrency; US 18 western terminus; west end of US 18 concurrency
Converse		371.659	598.127		WYO 319 south	
Converse		371.659	598.127		Eastbound road closure gate (weather depending)	
Niobrara		401.555	646.240		Westbound road closure gate (weather depending)	
Niobrara	Manville	402.546	647.835		WYO 270 – Manville, Lance Creek, Guernsey	
Niobrara		409.535	659.083		Westbound road closure gate (weather depending)	
Niobrara		410.055	659.920		Lusk rest area	
Niobrara	Lusk	410.356	660.404		WYO 273 north	
Niobrara	Lusk	411.649	662.485		US 85 south (Cedar Street) – Torrington	West end of US 85 concurrency
Niobrara	Lusk	412.145	663.283		US 18 east / US 85 north (Cedar Street) – Newcastle	East end of US 18 / US 85 concurrency
Niobrara	Lusk	412.615	664.039		Eastbound road closure gate (weather depending)	
Niobrara		434.003	698.460		US 20 east – Harrison, Chadron	Continuation into Nebraska
1.000 mi = 1.609 km; 1.000 km = 0.621 mi: Closed/former; Concurrency terminus

U.S. Route 20
Previous state: Montana	Wyoming	Next state: Nebraska
