= Dwight D. Eisenhower Highway (Wyoming) =

Dwight D. Eisenhower Highway (Wyoming) can refer to:

- Interstate 25 from the Colorado state line to Interstate 80 in Cheyenne
- Interstate 80 from the Utah state line to Interstate 25 in Cheyenne
