= List of U.S. Highways in Wyoming =

- Signage for U.S. Highway 16, U.S. Highway 14A and U.S. Highway 191

Highway names
- US Highways: U.S. Highway X (US X)

System links
- Wyoming State Highway System; Interstate; US; State

The U.S. Highways in Wyoming are the segments of the United States Numbered Highway System owned and maintained by the Wyoming Department of Transportation.

== List ==
Number	Length (mi)	Length (km)	Southern or western terminus	Northern or eastern terminus	Formed	Removed	Notes
US 12	—	—	Mammoth Hot Springs	US 12 at the Montana state line	1926	1959	US 12 was initially proposed to go through Wyoming along present-day US 212.
US 14	400.283	644.193	Yellowstone National Park	I-90 / US 14 at the South Dakota line	1936	current	
US 16	418.874	674.112	Yellowstone National Park	US 16 at the South Dakota line	—	—	
US 18	98.727	158.886	I-25 / US 20 / US 26 / US 87 in Orin	US 18 at the South Dakota line	1926	current	
US 20	434.003	698.460	Yellowstone National Park	US 20 at the Nebraska line	1926	current	
US 26	475.050	764.519	US 26 at the Idaho line	US 26 at the Nebraska line	1926	current	
US 30	453.936	730.539	US 30 at the Idaho line	US 30 at the Nebraska line	—	—	Lincoln Highway
US 85	256.585	412.934	US 85 at the Colorado line	US 85 at the South Dakota line	—	—	
US 87	364.147	586.038	I-25/US 87 at the Colorado line	I-90/US 87 at the Montana line	—	—	
US 89	155.610	250.430	US 89 at the Idaho line	Yellowstone National Park	—	—	
US 116	158	254	Cody	Ucross	1926	1934	Replaced by US 14 and US 14A
US 185	124	200	Cheyenne	Casper	1926	1934	Replaced by US 87
US 187	207.71	334.28	I-80 BL/US 30 Bus. in Rock Springs	US 26/US 89/US 287 in Moran	1926	1982	Replaced by US 191
US 189	197.806	318.338	US 189 at the Utah line	US 26/US 89/US 191 in Jackson	1939	current	
US 191	289.402	465.747	US 191 at the Utah line	Yellowstone National Park	1926	current	
US 212	55.214	88.858	US 212 at the Montana line near Cooke City, MT US 212 at the Montana line near Alzada, MT	US 212 at the Montana line near Beartooth Pass US 212 at the South Dakota line near Colony	1926	current	Beartooth Highway (western segment)
US 216	60	97	Moorcroft	US 216 at the South Dakota line	1930	1934	Replaced by US 16
US 285	24	39	US 285 at the Colorado state line	Laramie	1926	1936	Replaced by US 287
US 287	462.723	744.680	US 287 at the Colorado state line	Yellowstone National Park in Teton County	—	—	
US 310	52.902	85.138	US 14/US 16/US 20/WYO 789 in Greybull	US 310 at the Montana line	—	—	
US 312	35	56	US 312 at the Montana line	US 312 at the Montana line	1959	1962	Beartooth Highway; replaced by US 212
US 320	26	42	Shoshoni	Riverton	1926	1939	Replaced by US 26
US 420	41	66	Deaver	Cody	1926	1933	Replaced by US 116, which became part of US 14 one year later
US 789	—	—	Colorado state line near Baggs	Montana state line near Frannie	—	—	Proposed, but never commissioned as a U.S. Highway. Designation only existed as WYO 789.
Former

== Special routes ==
Number	Length (mi)	Length (km)	Southern or western terminus	Northern or eastern terminus	Formed	Removed	Notes
US 14A	103	166	US 14 in Cody	US 14 in Burgess Junction	1936	current	
US 14 Bus.	—	—	—	—	—	—	Served Sheridan
US 16 Bus.	—	—	—	—	—	—	Serves Newcastle
US 16 Truck	—	—	—	—	—	—	Serves Newcastle
US 20 Alt.	—	—	Idaho-Wyoming state line	Jackson	—	—	
US 20 Bus.	—	—	Mountain View	Casper	—	—	
US 20 Byp.	—	—	Mountain View	Casper	—	—	
US 20 Bus.	—	—	—	—	—	—	Serves Douglas
US 20 Byp.	—	—	—	—	—	—	Served Manville
US 26 Bus.	—	—	Mountain View	Casper	—	—	
US 26 Byp.	—	—	Mountain View	Casper	—	—	
US 26 Bus.	—	—	—	—	—	—	Serves Douglas
US 30 Byp.	—	—	Kemmerer	Diamondville	—	—	
US 30 Bus.	—	—	—	—	—	—	Serves Green River
US 30 Bus.	—	—	—	—	—	—	Serves Rock Springs
US 30 Bus.	—	—	—	—	—	—	Serves Rawlins
US 30 Bus.	—	—	Pine Bluffs	Nebraska-Wyoming state line	—	—	
US 85 Alt.	—	—	Mule Creek Junction	Wyoming-South Dakota state line	—	—	
US 87 Bus.	—	—	—	—	—	—	Serves Cheyenne
US 87 Bus.	—	—	—	—	—	—	Serves Wheatland
US 87 Bus.	—	—	—	—	—	—	Serves Douglas
US 87 Bus.	—	—	—	—	—	—	Serves Casper
US 87 Bus.	—	—	—	—	—	—	Serves Buffalo
US 87 Bus.	—	—	—	—	—	—	Serves Sheridan
Temp. US 89	—	—	Wyoming-Utah state line	Hoback	—	—	
US 189 Bus.	—	—	—	—	—	—	Serves Evanston
US 191 Spur	1.315	2.116	—	—	—	—	Unsigned; serves Rock Springs
US 287 Bus.	—	—	—	—	—	—	Serves Rawlins
US 287 Byp.	—	—	—	—	—	—	Serves Rawlins
Former
