= Interstate 25 in Wyoming =

Section of Interstate Highway in Wyoming, United States

Interstate 25
- I-25 highlighted in red

Route information
- Maintained by WYDOT
- Length: 300.530 mi (483.656 km)
- Existed: 1964–present
- NHS: Entire route

Major junctions
- South end: I-25 / US 87 at the Colorado state line near Cheyenne
- I-80 in Cheyenne; US 30 in Cheyenne; US 85 near Cheyenne; US 18 / US 20 in Orin; US 20 / US 26 in Casper; US 16 in Buffalo
- North end: I-90 / US 87 near Buffalo

Location
- Country: United States
- State: Wyoming
- Counties: Laramie, Platte, Converse, Natrona, Johnson

Highway system
- Interstate Highway System; Main; Auxiliary; Suffixed; Business; Future; Wyoming State Highway System; Interstate; US; State
← WYO 24	→ US 26

Interstate 25 (I-25) is a part of the Interstate Highway System that runs from Las Cruces, New Mexico, to Buffalo, Wyoming. In Wyoming, the Interstate Highway runs 300.530 miles (483.656 km) from the Colorado state line near Cheyenne north to its national terminus at I-90 near Buffalo. I-25 connects Wyoming's largest city and capital, Cheyenne, with its second largest city, Casper, and the smaller communities of Wheatland, Douglas, and Buffalo. The highway also connects those cities with Denver and Billings via I-90. I-25 runs concurrently with U.S. Route 87 (US 87) for almost its entire course in Wyoming. The highway also has extensive concurrencies with US 20 and US 26 along its east–west segment through the North Platte River valley. The Interstate has business loops through Cheyenne, Chugwater, Wheatland, Douglas, Glenrock, Casper, and Buffalo.

== Route description ==
=== Cheyenne to Wheatland ===
I-25 enters Laramie County concurrent with US 87 from Weld County, Colorado, southwest of Cheyenne and briefly runs parallel to a BNSF Railway line. The four-lane Interstate has its first interchange, a diamond interchange, with Wyoming Highway 223 (WYO 223, Terry Ranch Road), and crosses over the Union Pacific Railroad's Speer Subdivision rail line and over the BNSF rail line. I-25 meets High Plains Road at a dumbbell interchange, then has a diverging diamond interchange with WYO 212 (College Drive), a junction that serves as the southern end of Interstate 25 Business (I-25 Bus.). The freeway has a cloverleaf interchange with I-80, crosses over the Union Pacific's Laramie Subdivision and US 30 (Lincolnway), and has a four-ramp partial cloverleaf interchange with US 30, which here is also part of I-80 Bus.

I-25 continues north along the western edge of the city of Cheyenne and along the eastern edge of Francis E. Warren Air Force Base, which is served by the next three interchanges. The highway has a five-ramp partial cloverleaf interchange with Missile Drive, crosses over a BNSF rail yard, and has a diamond interchange with Randall Avenue, which leads to Pershing Boulevard. I-25 reconnects with its business route at Central Avenue, where US 85 joins the Interstate. The freeway has a dumbbell interchange with Vandehei Avenue before leaving the city of Cheyenne and passing through the unincorporated area of Ranchettes. I-25 has an interchange with WYO 211 (Horse Creek Road) before US 85 splits to the northeast. There is no direct access from southbound I-25 to northbound US 85 at the latter interchange; southbound traffic uses the WYO 211 interchange to turn around to access northbound US 85.

I-25 continues through sparsely populated northern Laramie County, where the Interstate crosses Lodgepole Creek and has five interchanges with minor roads: Ridley Road, an unnamed road only marked as exit 25, Whitaker Road, Nimmo Road, and an unnamed road that serves the Little Bear Community. The Interstate enters Platte County at its interchange with Bear Creek Road. I-25's first population center north of Cheyenne is Chugwater, where the highway crosses over a BNSF rail line and Chugwater Creek, has an interchange with WYO 211 and WYO 313 in town, and has an interchange with WYO 321 (Ty Basin Road) north of town. Those two interchanges serve as the termini for Chugwater's I-25 Bus. The Interstate meets the western end of WYO 314 (Slater Road) west of Slater; has minor interchanges with Hunton Road, Antelope Road, and Bordeaux Road; and meets the eastern end of WYO 34.

=== Wheatland to Casper ===
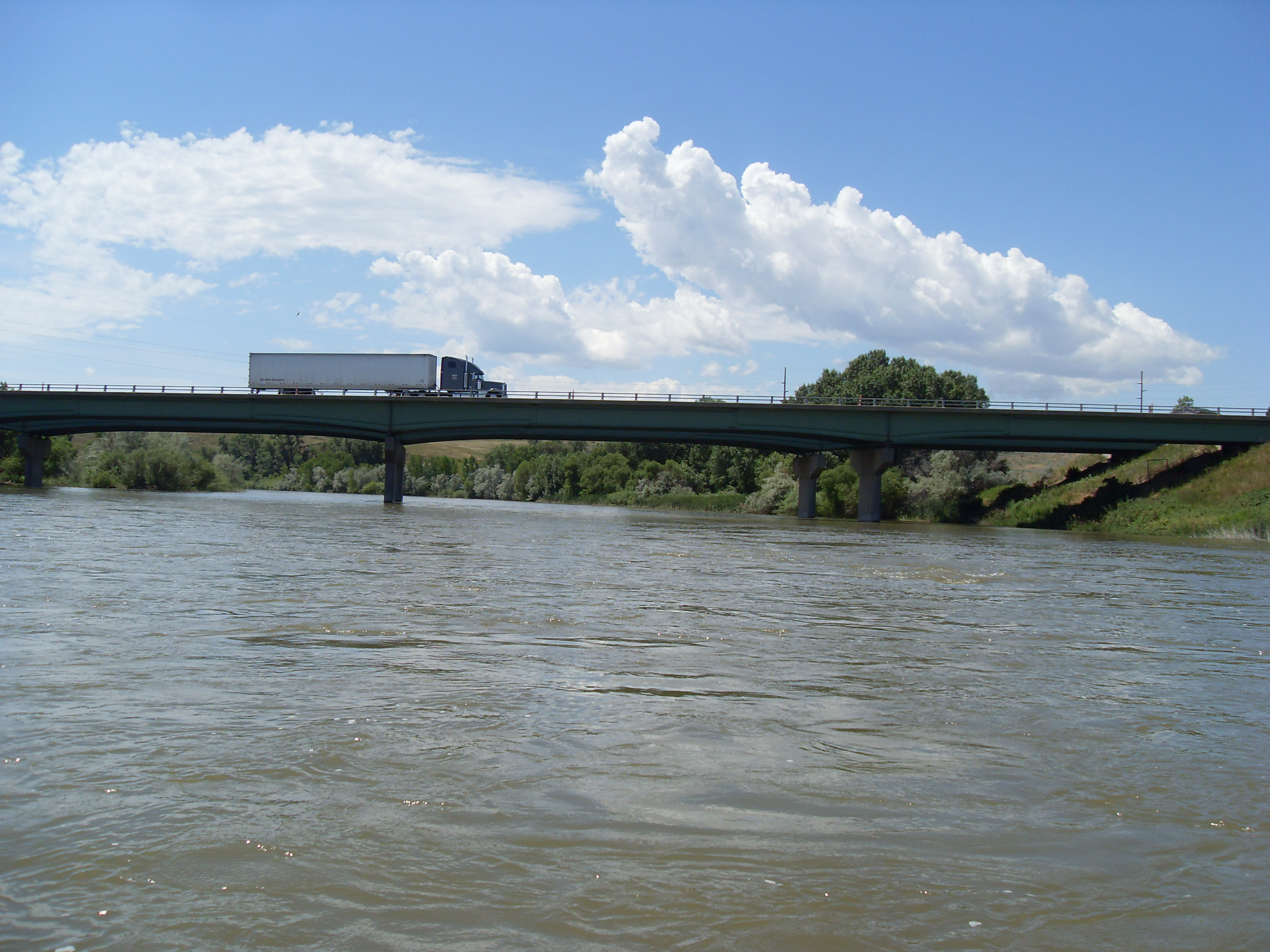
I-25 bridge over the North Platte River at Douglas

I-25's next serves the town of Wheatland, the county seat of Platte County. Wheatland's I-25 Bus. splits off onto Mariposa Boulevard and provides access to WYO 310 and WYO 312. The Interstate and business route reconvene at the north end of town. I-25 has minor interchanges with Laramie River Road near its crossing of the Laramie River and with Johnson Road. The Interstate meets US 26 at a directional T interchange at Dwyer Junction, and the U.S. Route joins I-25 and US 87 heading north. I-25 has minor interchanges with El Rancho Road and an unnamed access road to Middle Bear around a junction with the southern end of WYO 319 (Cassa Road). The Interstate has an interchange with Wyoming Highway 319 Spur (WYO 319 Spur) in the town of Glendo, then parallels WYO 319 and the BNSF rail line northwest into Converse County to the west of the Glendo Reservoir, an impoundment of the North Platte River. I-25 crosses over the North Platte River and a BNSF rail line at Orin, where the Interstate has an interchange with and is joined by US 20; this interchange serves as the western terminus of US 18.

I-25, US 87, US 20, and US 26 head west to Douglas, the county seat of Converse County. I-25 Bus. and its companion business routes—US 87 Bus., US 20 Bus., and US 26 Bus.—split northwest from a trumpet interchange into the city while I-25 and the mainline U.S. Routes pass to the south of the city. I-25 crosses over the BNSF rail line and the North Platte River, then curves northwest to meet the business routes at a trumpet interchange on the west side of the city near the business routes' intersection with WYO 59, which leads north to Gillette. I-25 continues west through interchanges with the western end of WYO 96 (La Prele Road), Inez Road, the road south to Ayres Natural Bridge, Barber Road, and Bixby Road. US 87, US 20, and US 26 diverge from I-25 east of Glenrock. I-25 Bus. joins the U.S. Routes in heading northwest toward the town, then reconnects with I-25 via WYO 95 (Deer Creek Road) south of town. I-25 enters Natrona County and has interchanges with WYO 253 (Hat Six Road) and WYO 258 (Wyoming Boulevard), which serves the town of Evansville to the north.

=== Casper to Buffalo ===
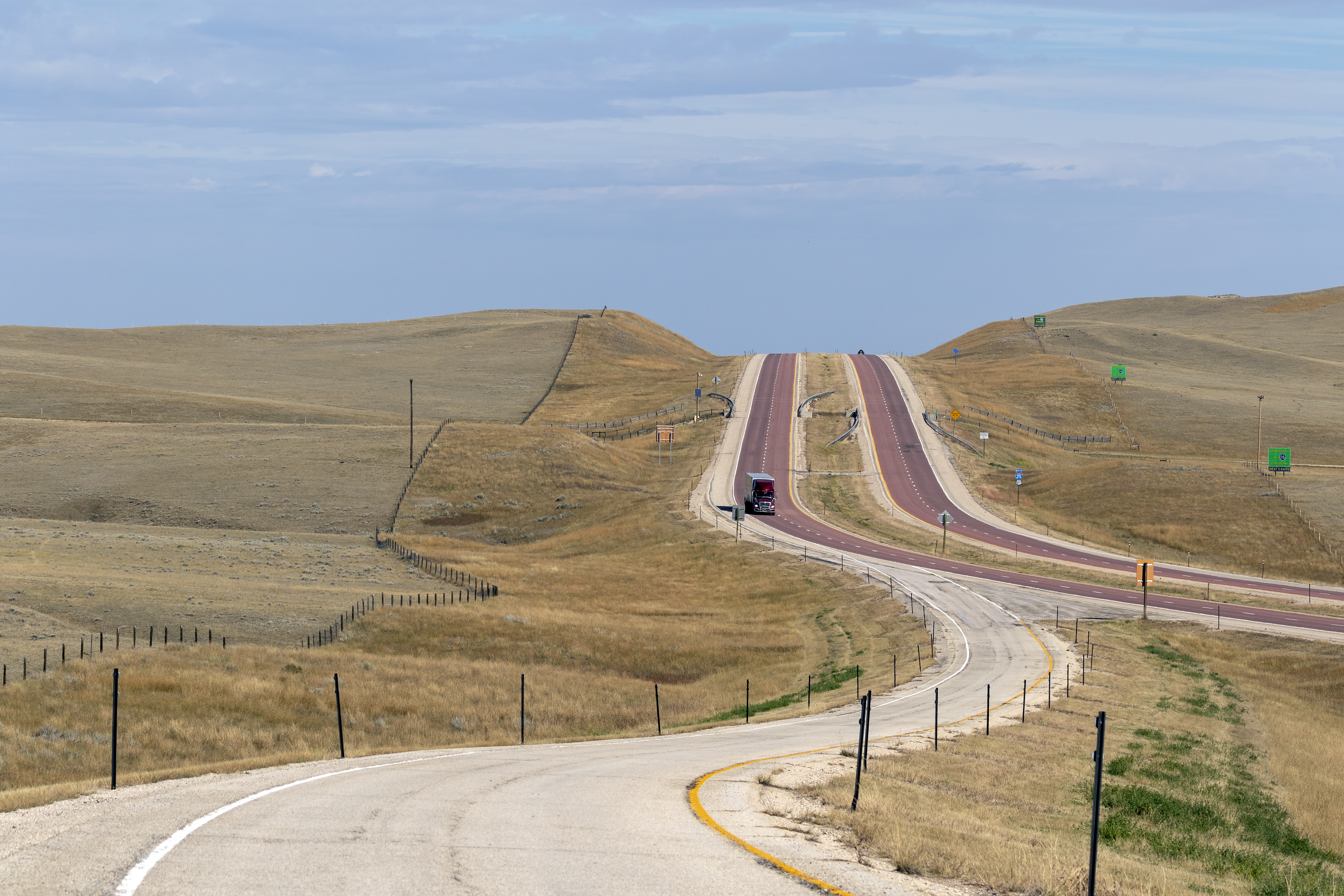
I-25 south of Buffalo

I-25 briefly parallels US 87, US 20, and US 26 (Yellowstone Highway) and enters the city of Casper at a complex junction—the complexity is explained in the description for I-25 Bus.—where the Interstate crosses over Yellowstone Highway, the three U.S. Routes join I-25, I-25 Bus. splits from the Interstate to serve downtown Casper, and US 87 Bus., US 20 Bus., and US 26 Bus. split from the mainline U.S. Routes on Yellowstone Avenue. I-25, US 87, US 20, and US 26 cross over the BNSF rail line and are paralleled by a pair of frontage roads, F Street to the north and E Street to the south. There are several slip ramps between I-25 and the frontage roads serving the three streets that connect the portion of Casper north of the BNSF rail line to downtown Casper. The first street, which is Bryan Stock Trail north of the Interstate and Beverly Street to the south, is part of the complex junction between the mainline Interstate and U.S. Routes and their business routes. The second street is McKinley Street, and the third street is Center Street and carries the northmost portion of I-25 Bus. and US 87 Bus. E Street begins from an exit ramp to Center Street as I-25 and F Street cross the North Platte River. West of the river, the freeway has a diamond interchange with WYO 220 (Poplar Street), then curves north and has a diamond interchange with US 20 and US 26, which split west toward Shoshoni and Casper–Natrona County International Airport, and the access road to the Casper Events Center.

I-25 leaves the city of Casper and has an interchange with WYO 254 (Wardwell Road) next to unincorporated Hartrandt and the town of Bar Nunn. The Interstate has an interchange with Ormsby Road in the Homa Hills area on the northern edge of the Casper populated area. I-25 has minor interchanges with Ranch Road and an unnamed road marketed as exit 223, then connects with the south end of WYO 387, which serves Midwest to the east, before entering Johnson County. The freeway has interchanges with Tisdale Mountain Road and Powder River Road just north of the highway's crossing of the South Fork of the Powder River. I-25 meets the southern end of WYO 196 (TTT Road) and parallels the state highway to Kaycee, where the highway crosses the Middle Fork of the Powder River and has an interchange with WYO 191. North of Kaycee, I-25 crosses the North Fork of the Powder River and has minor interchanges with Reno Road, Middle Fork Road, and Trabing Road and a crossings of two branches of Crazy Woman Creek near the Middle Fork interchange. The final I-25 Bus. and its companion, US 87 Bus., split off to the south of the town of Buffalo, the county seat of Johnson County. East of the town, I-25 has an interchange with US 16, which also carries I-90 Bus. The Interstate reaches its northern terminus at a directional T interchange with I-90. US 87 continues north along westbound I-90 toward Sheridan and Billings; I-90 also heads east toward Gillette. Buffalo's I-25 Bus. and US 87 Bus. have their northern terminuses at a partial interchange just west of the I-25/I-90 junction.

== History ==
The first section of I-25 to be built with funds from the Federal-Aid Highway Act of 1956 was a section near Cheyenne, which commenced in 1958. Earlier funds from the state government had been used to begin work on a freeway bypass of Casper in 1953; its first 3-mile (4.8 km) section was opened to traffic on October 1, 1960. The final section of the freeway, spanning 26 miles (42 km) between Casper and Kaycee, was opened on February 2, 1982.

== Exit list ==
County	Location	mi	km	Exit	Destinations	Notes
Laramie		0.000	0.000		I-25 south (US 87 south) – Ft. Collins, Denver	Continuation into Colorado
Laramie		2.662	4.284	2	WYO 223 east (Terry Ranch Road)	
Laramie				4	High Plains Road	Dumbbell interchange
Laramie		7.857	12.645	7	I-25 BL north / US 87 Bus. north (College Drive) / WYO 212	Diverging diamond interchange
Laramie		8.844	14.233	8	I-80 to US 85 – Laramie, Sidney	Split into exits 8B (west) and 8D (east); I-80 exits 359A-C
Laramie	Cheyenne	9.140	14.709	9	I-80 BL / US 30 (Lincolnway) – Central Business District	
Laramie	Cheyenne	10.586	17.037	10	Missile Drive – Warren Gate 2	Split into exits 10B (Warren Gate 2) and 10D (Missile Drive) southbound
Laramie	Cheyenne	11.239	18.087	11	Randall Avenue, Pershing Boulevard – Warren Gate 1	
Laramie	Cheyenne	12.697	20.434	12	I-25 BL south / US 87 Bus. south (Central Avenue) / US 85 south	South end of US 85 concurrency
Laramie	Cheyenne	13.834	22.264	13	Vandehei Avenue	Dumbbell interchange
Laramie	Ranchettes	16.230	26.120	16	WYO 211 (Horse Creek Road) to US 85 north – Torrington	US 85 north not signed northbound
Laramie	Ranchettes	17.236	27.739	17	US 85 north – Torrington	No southbound exit; north end of US 85 concurrency
Laramie		21.318	34.308	21	Ridley Road	
Laramie		25.452	40.961	25	Exit 25	
Laramie		29.512	47.495	29	Whitaker Road	
Laramie		34.440	55.426	34	Nimmo Road	
Laramie		39.235	63.143	39	Little Bear Community	
Laramie–Platte county line		47.248	76.038	47	Bear Creek Road	
Platte	Chugwater	54.590	87.854	54	I-25 BL north / WYO 321 north – Chugwater	
Platte		57.649	92.777	57	I-25 BL south / WYO 321 south (TY Basin Road) – Chugwater	
Platte		65.253	105.015	65	WYO 314 east (Slater Road)	
Platte		66.200	106.539	66	Hunton Road	
Platte		68.454	110.166	68	Antelope Road	
Platte		70.621	113.653	70	Bordeaux Road	
Platte		73.025	117.522	73	WYO 34 west – Laramie	
Platte	Wheatland	78.600	126.494	78	I-25 BL north / US 87 Bus. north – Wheatland	
Platte	Wheatland	80.853	130.120	80	I-25 BL south / US 87 Bus. south – Wheatland	
Platte		84.744	136.382	84	Laramie River Road	
Platte		87.505	140.826	87	Johnson Road	
Platte	Dwyer Junction	92.371	148.657	92	US 26 east – Guernsey, Torrington	Directional T interchange; south end of US 26 concurrency
Platte		94.825	152.606	94	El Rancho Road	
Platte		100.125	161.136	100	Cassa Road (WYO 319)	Southern terminus of WYO 319
Platte		104.043	167.441	104	Middle Bear	
Platte	Glendo	111.675	179.723	111	WYO 319 Spur – Glendo	
Converse	Orin	126.467	203.529	126	US 18 east / US 20 east – Lusk	South end of US 20 concurrency; US 18 western terminus
Converse	Douglas	135.472	218.021	135	I-25 BL north (US 20 Bus. west / US 26 Bus. west / US 87 Bus. north) – Douglas	
Converse	Douglas	140.101	225.471	140	I-25 BL south (US 20 Bus. east / US 26 Bus. east / US 87 Bus. south) to WYO 59 – Douglas, Gillette	
Converse		146.003	234.969	146	WYO 96 east (La Prele Road)	
Converse		150.442	242.113	150	Inez Road	
Converse		151.166	243.278	151	Ayres Natural Bridge	
Converse		154.237	248.220	154	Barber Road	
Converse		156.178	251.344	156	Bixby Road	
Converse		160.871	258.897	160	I-25 BL north / US 20 west / US 26 west / US 87 north – East Glenrock	North end of US 20 / US 26 / US 87 concurrency
Converse		165.909	267.005	165	I-25 BL east (WYO 95 north) – Glenrock, Rolling Hills	
Natrona	Casper	182.530	293.754	182	Hat Six Road (WYO 253) – Brookhurst	
Natrona	Casper	185.354	298.298	185	Wyoming Boulevard (WYO 258) – Evansville	
Natrona	Casper	186.452– 186.785	300.065– 300.601	186	US 20 east / US 26 east / US 87 south / I-25 BL north / US 20 Bus. west / US 26 Bus. west / US 87 Bus. north (N. Beverly Street) / Bryan Stock Trail	South end of US 20 / US 26 / US 87 concurrency; I-25 BL / US 20 Bus. / US 26 Bus. / US 87 Bus. signed northbound; US 20 / US 26 / US 87 signed southbound
Natrona	Casper	187.527	301.795	187	McKinley Street	
Natrona	Casper	188.185– 188.340	302.854– 303.104	188A	I-25 BL south / US 87 Bus. south / WYO 255 south (Center Street)	No northbound entrance
Natrona	Casper	188.600	303.522	188B	Poplar Street (WYO 220)	
Natrona	Casper	189.507	304.982	189	US 20 west / US 26 west to WYO 220 west – Shoshoni, Port of Entry	North end of US 20 / US 26 concurrency
Natrona	Hartrandt	191.644	308.421	191	WYO 254 south (Wardwell Road)	
Natrona	Bar Nunn	194	312	194	Westwinds Road	Opened on October 5, 2018
Natrona	Homa Hills	197.522	317.881	197	Ormsby Road	
Natrona		210.412	338.625	210	WYO 259 north (Horse Creek Ranch Road)	
Natrona		216.605	348.592	216	Ranch Road	
Natrona		223.780	360.139	223	No name exit	
Natrona		227.987	366.910	227	WYO 387 north – Midwest, Edgerton	
Johnson		235.375	378.799	235	Tisdale Mountain Road	
Johnson		246.560	396.800	246	Powder River Road	
Johnson		249.688	401.834	249	WYO 196 north (TTT Road)	
Johnson	Kaycee	254.254	409.182	254	WYO 191 – Kaycee	
Johnson		265.476	427.242	265	Reno Road	
Johnson		280.177	450.901	280	Middle Fork Road	
Johnson		291.077	468.443	291	Trabing Road	
Johnson	Buffalo	298.024	479.623	298	I-25 BL north / US 87 Bus. north – Buffalo	
Johnson	Buffalo	299.321	481.710	299	I-90 BL / US 16 – Buffalo	
Johnson		300.530	483.656	300	I-90 / US 87 north – Sheridan, Gillette, Rapid City	Northern terminus of I-25; north end of US 87 concurrency; I-90 exit 56B; tri-level directional T interchange
1.000 mi = 1.609 km; 1.000 km = 0.621 mi: Concurrency terminus; Incomplete access

== Related routes ==
Interstate 25 Business
- Location: Wyoming

I-25 in Wyoming currently has no auxiliary Interstates but has six business loops and one business spur. Its business loops are located in Cheyenne, Chugwater, Wheatland, Douglas, Glenrock, and Casper. The business spur is located in Buffalo.

Interstate 25
Previous state: Colorado	Wyoming	Next state: Terminus
