= Special routes of U.S. Route 20 =

Special routes of U.S. Route 20

Highway system
- United States Numbered Highway System; List; Special; Divided

Several special routes of U.S. Route 20 (US 20) exist. In order from west to east, they are as follows.

== Oregon ==
=== Toledo business loop ===
U.S. Highway 20 Business
- Location: Toledo, Oregon

U.S. Route 20 Business (US 20 Bus.) in Toledo, Oregon, runs from an intersection with the main highway west of Toledo on the Toledo Frontage Road and 5th Street through Toledo and again on the Toledo Frontage Road to an intersection with the main highway east of Toledo. US 20 Bus. in Toledo is also called Sharon Branstiter Memorial Drive, in memory of Toledo's former mayor.

=== Bend business loop ===
U.S. Highway 20 Business
- Location: Bend, Oregon

U.S. Route 20 Business (US 20 Bus.) in Bend, Oregon, runs from an intersection with the main highway north of Bend, south on East 1st Street, Deschutes Place, and Wall Street to Newport Avenue, concurrent with US 97 Bus., and then east on Newport and Greenwood avenues to the main highway concurrent with East 3rd Avenue in Bend.

== Idaho ==
=== Mountain Home–Carey temporary route ===
U.S. Highway 20 Temporary
- Location: Mountain Home–Carey, Idaho

=== Idaho Falls business loop ===
U.S. Highway 20 Business
- Location: Idaho Falls, Idaho

U.S. Highway 20 Business (US 20 Bus.) in Idaho Falls, Idaho, is overlapped by US 26. It begins at Interstate 15 (I-15) exit 118 on West Broadway Street and runs concurrent with the I-15 Bus. until the intersection with Yellowstone Avenue, where I-15 Bus. turns south and US 20 Bus./US 26 turns north. Curving under a set of railroad bridges, the street name briefly changes to the Northgate Mile. The concurrency with US 26 ends when US 20 Bus. turns north onto North Holmes Avenue, while US 26 continues along North Yellowstone Highway. The railroad line that the route previously ran under is encountered again at the intersection with East Anderson Street, where the tracks cross from the southwest corner to the northeast corner. A while after crossing a bridge over South Fork Willow Creek, North Holmes Avenue intersects 29th Road North and suddenly gains the additional name of Lewisville Road. US 20 Bus. ends at the diamond interchange with US 20 (Rigby Highway), known as exit 310.

=== Rigby business route ===
U.S. Highway 20 Business
- Location: Rigby, Idaho

=== Sugar City–Jackson alternate route ===
U.S. Highway 20 Alternate
- Location: Sugar City, Idaho–Jackson, Wyoming
- Length: 72 mi (116 km)
- Existed: 1950–1958

=== St. Anthony business loop ===
U.S. Highway 20 Business
- Location: St. Anthony, Idaho

U.S. Highway 20 Business (US 20 Bus.) in St. Anthony, Idaho, begins at exit 346 on US 20 and proceeds northward onto Bridge Avenue. After crossing Henrys Fork, the route enters the St. Anthony downtown area. Once through the downtown area, it turns to the east on the Yellowstone Highway. US 20 Bus. continues to the east, crossing Henrys Fork again, before bending to the southwest and ending at an intersection with mainline US 20.

== Wyoming ==
=== Casper business loop ===
U.S. Highway 20 Business
- Location: Casper, Wyoming
- Length: 6.112 mi (9.836 km)

U.S. Highway 26 Business
- Location: Casper, Wyoming
- Length: 6.112 mi (9.836 km)

U.S. Route 20 Business and U.S. Route 26 Business in the Casper, Wyoming area is a concurrent business spur that goes from the intersection of US 20, US 26, and SR 257 in Mountain View to I-25 in Casper, following 1st Street and Yellowstone Street. It is also partially concurrent with I-25 Business and US 87 Business.

Major intersections

The entire route is in Natrona County.

Location	mi	km	Destinations	Notes
Mountain View	0.000	0.000	US 20 west / US 26 west – Shoshoni US 20 east / US 26 east to I-25 / US 87 – Sheridan, Cheyenne WYO 257 south to WYO 220 – Rawlins	US 20 Bus. / US 26 Bus. western terminus
Mills	1.534	2.469	WYO 258 south (Wyoming Boulevard) to WYO 220 / Hudson Street – Rawlins	
Mills	2.661	4.282	WYO 254 north (Salt Creek Highway)	
Casper	3.715	5.979	WYO 220 (Poplar Street) to I-25	
Casper	4.352	7.004	Center Street (WYO 255 north) / I-25 BL north / US 87 Bus. north to I-25	West end of I-25 BL / US 87 Bus. overlap; WYO 255 is unsigned
Casper	4.418– 4.490	7.110– 7.226	Wolcott Street / Durbin Street (WYO 251 south)	One-way pair
Casper	6.062– 6.112	9.756– 9.836	I-25 / US 20 west / US 26 west / US 87 north / Beverly Street – Cheyenne US 20 east / US 26 east / US 87 south / I-25 BL ends / US 87 Bus. ends (Yellowstone Highway)	I-25 exit 186; US 20 Bus. / US 26 Bus. eastern terminus; I-25 BL / US 87 Bus. southern terminus; road continues east as US 20 / US 26 / US 87
1.000 mi = 1.609 km; 1.000 km = 0.621 mi: Concurrency terminus

=== Mountain View–Casper bypass route ===
U.S. Highway 20 Bypass
- Location: Mountain View–Casper, Wyoming

U.S. Highway 26 Bypass
- Location: Mountain View–Casper, Wyoming

=== Douglas business loop ===
U.S. Highway 20 Business
- Location: Douglas

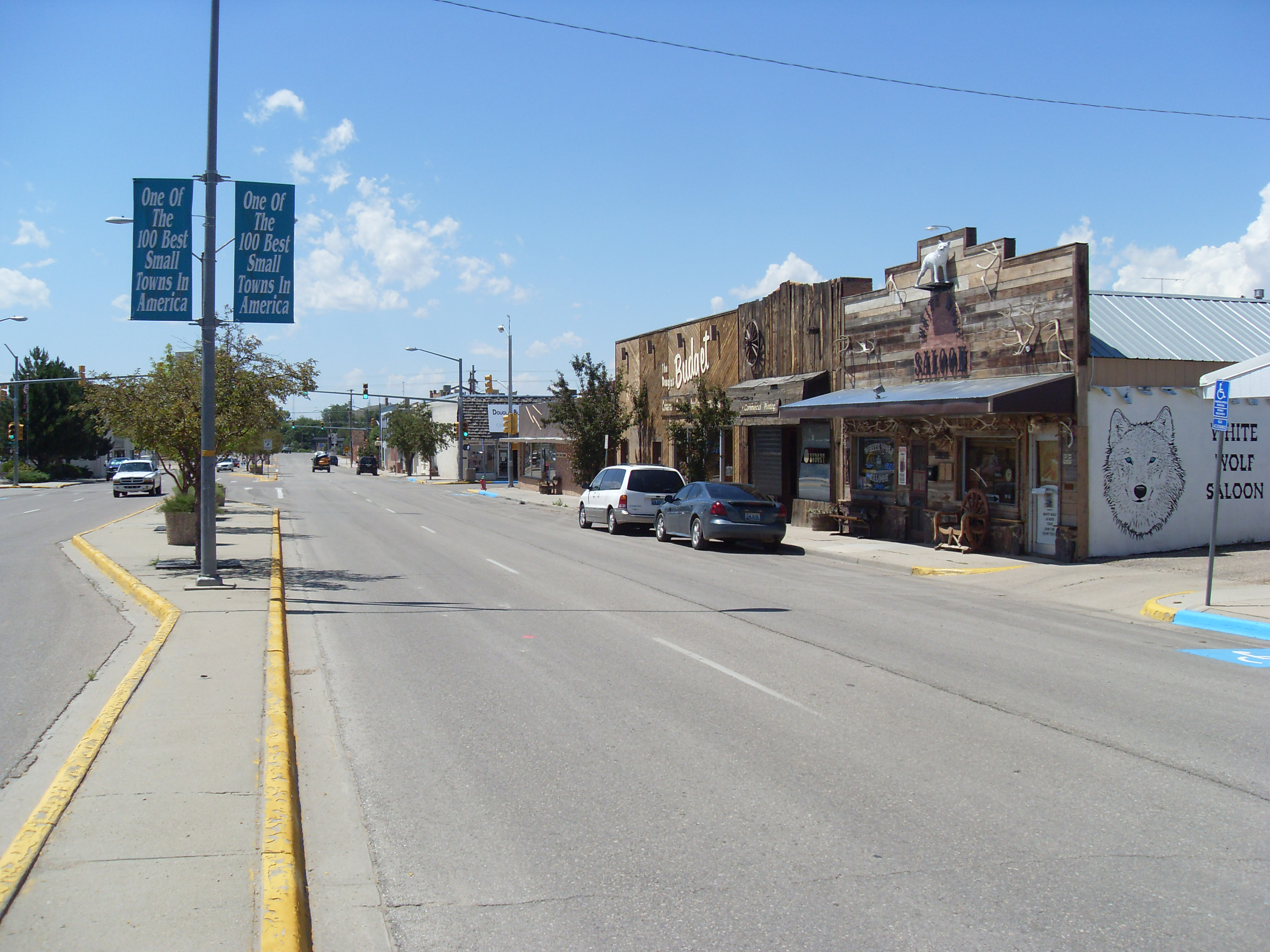
Center Street—Douglas, WY

Interstate 25 Business
- Location: Douglas
- Length: 4.966 mi (7.992 km)

U.S. Highway 26 Business
- Location: Douglas

U.S. Highway 87 Business
- Location: Douglas

U.S. Route 20 Business (US 20 Bus.), Interstate 25 Business (I-25 Bus.), U.S. Route 26 Business (US 26 Bus.), and U.S. Route 87 Business (US 87 Bus.) are concurrent 4.966-mile (7.992 km) business loops serving the town of Douglas in southern Converse County. I‑25 Bus. / US 20 Bus. / US 26 Bus. / US 87 Bus. begin at exit 135 of I‑25 / US 20 / U.S. Route 26 / U.S. Route 87 southeast of Douglas. The loops follow East Richards Street into Douglas. At South 4th Street, the loops turn north through Douglas. The loops turn west onto Center Street one mile (1.6 km) later, which becomes Yellowstone Highway. Near their end, the northern terminus of WYO 94 and the southern terminus of Wyoming Highway 59 are intersected at Riverbend Drive. Past that intersection, the business routes rejoin I‑25 / US 20 / US 26 / US 87 at exit 140.

Major intersections

The entire route is in Converse County.

Location	mi	km	Destinations	Notes
	0.000	0.000	I-25 / US 20 / US 26 / US 87 – Cheyenne, Casper	Southern terminus of I-25 Bus./US 87 Bus., eastern terminus of US 20 Bus./US 26 Bus.; exit 135 on I-25
Douglas	4.599	7.401	WYO 59 north / WYO 94 south (Riverbend Drive) to WYO 91 – Gillette, Esterbrook, Law Enforcement Academy, Eastern Wyoming College Douglas Campus	Southern terminus of WYO 59; northern terminus of WYO 94
Douglas	4.966	7.992	I-25 / US 20 / US 26 / US 87 – Cheyenne, Casper	Northern terminus of I-25 Bus./US 87 Bus., western terminus of US 20 Bus./US 26 Bus.; exit 140 on I-25
1.000 mi = 1.609 km; 1.000 km = 0.621 mi

=== Manville bypass route ===
U.S. Highway 20 Bypass
- Location: Manville, Wyoming

U.S. Highway 6 Bypass
- Location: Manville, Wyoming

== Iowa ==
=== Sioux City business loop ===
U.S. Highway 20 Business
- Location: South Sioux City, Nebraska–Sioux City, Iowa
- Existed: 1979–present

Sioux City business route highlighted in red

U.S. Highway 20 Business (US 20 Bus.) in the Sioux City area originates in Nebraska, at the junction of Dakota Avenue and I-129 in South Sioux City. US 20 Bus. follows US 20's old alignment through South Sioux City before crossing into Iowa concurrently with US 77. US 20 Bus. then joins with I-29 for a very short distance before exiting onto Virginia Street and then Gordon Drive. US 20 Bus. westbound traffic does not join I-29 but skips it though a system of ramps. The route then follows Gordon Drive through central Sioux City to the US 20/US 75 bypass, where it rejoins US 20. US 20 Bus. in Sioux City is known officially as Iowa Highway 12 (Iowa 12), though Iowa 12 is signed as ending at I-29 in western Sioux City.

=== Fort Dodge business loop ===
U.S. Highway 20 Business
- Location: Fort Dodge, Iowa
- Existed: 1990–present

Fort Dodge business route highlighted in red

U.S. Highway 20 Business (US 20 Bus.) in Fort Dodge, Iowa, begins at the western end of the current US 20 expressway near Moorland and follows US 20's former route through the city via Kenyon Road and 5th Avenue South. Just east of Fort Dodge's eastern city limits, US 20 Bus. turns south on Webster County Road P59 (CR P59), passing through several gypsum mining areas before rejoining the US 20 expressway in Coalville.

== Illinois ==
=== Freeport business loop ===
U.S. Route 20 Business
- Location: Freeport, Illinois
- Existed: 1988–present

U.S. Route 20 Business (US 20 Bus.) is a business route of US 20 around Freeport, Illinois. In 1988, US 20 was rerouted away from Freeport after a bypass was completed. The former routing that ran through downtown Freeport along Galena Avenue and South Street became US 20 Bus. The bypass was initially completed as two-lanes with earthworks completed for four-lanes. The segment east of Illinois Route 26 (IL 26) was completed as four-lane in the early 1900s with the segment west of IL 26 completed in the late 1990s.

=== Rockford–Belvidere business loop ===
U.S. Route 20 Business
- Location: Rockford–Belvidere, Illinois
- Length: 21 mi (34 km)

U.S. Route 20 Business (US 20 Bus.) is the longest business route in Illinois that runs 21 miles (34 km) from just west of Rockford, Illinois, to just east of Belvidere. The route begins just west of Weldon Road and runs as State Street into downtown Rockford, where it is split into two one-way streets (Chestnut Street, Walnut Street, and First Avenue for eastbound traffic, with Jefferson Street and Kilburn Avenue for westbound traffic). The route continues east along State Street all the way through Rockford and becomes a two-lane highway between Rockford and Belvidere. US 20 is then routed in an outer loop around the city of Belvidere before merging back with US 20 near Genoa Road and I-90 (Jane Addams Memorial Tollway) as Belvidere Road. Locally, the segment in Belvidere is referred to as "The Bypass."

=== Elgin business loop ===
U.S. Route 20 Business
- Location: Elgin, Illinois
- Length: 5.5 mi (8.9 km)
- Existed: 1962–1984

U.S. Route 20 Business (US 20 Bus.) was a business loop along a former route of US 20 in Elgin, Illinois. The route began as Villa Street at a junction with US 20 Elgin Bypass in Southeast Elgin. Following Villa Street into downtown, it turned north briefly as Villa Court. Through downtown, westbound traffic followed Center Street for one block to take Highland Avenue across the Fox River. Eastbound traffic turned from Highland Avenue onto State Street for one block to take Chicago Street across the river to Villa Court. West of State Street, both directions of traffic followed Highland Avenue and Larkin Avenue to the other end of the Elgin Bypass. This special route was created when US 20 was rerouted to the Elgin Bypass in 1962. The route was decommissioned in 1984.

=== Chicago business loop ===
U.S. Route 20 Business
- Location: Melrose Park–Chicago, Illinois
- Length: 27.8 mi (44.7 km)
- Existed: 1938–1968

City U.S. Route 20
- Location: Elmhurst–Chicago, Illinois

U.S. Route 20 Business
- Location: Chicago, Illinois–Hammond, Indiana

City U.S. Route 20 (City US 20) was created in 1938 to roughly follow the former alignment of US 20 through Chicago while the main highway was routed around the city. From US 20 at the intersection of Lake Street and Mannheim Road, the city route went east on Lake Street. At Harlem Avenue, it turned south to continue east on Washington Boulevard. At Garfield Park the route split, eastbound traffic followed Warren Boulevard while westbound traffic followed Washington Boulevard. Initially, opposing traffic traveled together on Washington Boulevard from Union Park to the South Branch Chicago River where it followed Wacker Drive to Michigan Avenue. When Chicago changed many downtown streets to one-way in 1955, eastbound traffic followed Washington Boulevard while westbound traffic followed Randolph Street. The route followed both streets to Michigan Avenue for four years before returning to Wacker Drive. At Michigan Avenue, the route joined City US 12 to head south. The original route took 16th Street one block east to Indiana Avenue and thence to Cermak Road. In 1958, eastbound traffic continued on Michigan to Cermak Road while westbound traffic followed Indiana Avenue to 14th Street. The route followed Cermak Road to a short diagonal named Silverton Way to South Parkway (now Martin Luther King Drive). From there, the route followed Oakwood, Drexel, and Hyde Park boulevards to Jackson Park. Traversing the park on what came to be known as part of Cornell Drive (Avenue), the route continued South on Stony Island Avenue, rejoining US 20 at 95th Street. In 1960, this route was redesignated as U.S. Route 20 Business (US 20 Bus.). The eastern end of the route was moved in 1963 to the Chicago Skyway as Toll Business U.S. Route 20 (Toll Bus. US 20) to rejoin the main highway at Indianapolis Boulevard at the state line. The route was decommissioned in 1968.

== Indiana ==
=== Tremont–Michigan City alternate route ===
U.S. Route 20 Alternate
- Location: Tremont–Michigan City, Indiana

=== South Bend business loop ===
U.S. Route 20 Business
- Location: South Bend–Mishawaka, Indiana

U.S. Route 20 Business (US 20 Bus.) follows the former route of US 20 through South Bend and Mishawaka, Indiana, generally along Colfax Avenune and McKinley Avenue/McKinley Highway. Signage is inconsistent along parts of the route.

=== South Bend bypass route ===
U.S. Route 20 Bypass
- Location: South Bend–Elkhart, Indiana
- Length: 8.3 mi (13.4 km)

U.S. Route 20 Bypass (US 20 Byp.) was the designation for the portion of the St. Joseph Valley Parkway during the period when it was only open between US 31 south of South Bend, Indiana, and US 20 to the west in Elkhart. When the freeway was extended north and US 31 was rerouted onto it, the US 20 Byp. designation was removed. When the freeway was completed to the east reconnecting to US 20, the mainline US 20 designation was transferred to it, rather than the US 20 Byp. designation being reapplied to it.

=== Osceola–Elkhart truck route ===
U.S. Route 20 Truck
- Location: Osceola–Elkhart, Indiana

== Ohio ==
=== Ohio alternate route ===
U.S. Route 20A
- Location: Pioneer–Maumee, Ohio
- Length: 52.53 mi (84.54 km)
- Existed: 1935–present

U.S. Route 20S
- Location: Bridgewater Center–Busy Corners, Ohio
- Existed: 1932–1935

U.S. Route 20A (US 20A) is a 52.53-mile-long (84.54 km) east–west alternate route of US 20 located in northwest Ohio. The western terminus of the route is at US 20 south of Pioneer, and the eastern terminus is at US 20 in Maumee, southwest of Toledo. The route runs parallel to the Ohio Turnpike (I-80/I-90) for much of its length, and intersects the turnpike at exit 13 northeast of Montpelier in Holiday City. US 20 and US 20A are never more than five miles (8.0 km) apart for the entire 50-mile (80 km) stretch through the Ohio farm country, as the mainline of US 20 takes the more northerly route. The highway was previously designated U.S. Route 20S (US 20S).

=== US 20N ===
U.S. Route 20N
- Location: Bridgewater Township–Maumee, Ohio
- Existed: 1932–1935

U.S. Route 20N (US 20N) was the designation for US 20 in northwest Ohio between the endpoints of US 20S during the period when that route existed. In 1932, US 20N was established and acquired part of US 20 between Bridgewater Township and Maumee. By 1935, US 20N was decommissioned and was reverted to US 20.

=== Toledo–Gibsonburg Junction business route ===
U.S. Route 20 Business
- Location: Toledo–Gibsonburg Junction, Ohio

=== Perrysburg truck route ===
U.S. Route 20 Truck
- Location: Perrysburg, Ohio

=== Fremont business route ===
U.S. Route 20 Business
- Location: Fremont, Ohio

=== Western Greater Cleveland alternate route ===
U.S. Route 20A
- Location: Rocky River–Cleveland, Ohio
- Existed: 1971–1983

U.S. Route 20A (US 20A) ran concurrently with the current US 6 Alternate (US 6 Alt.) from their common eastern terminus in the Ohio City neighborhood in Cleveland to US 20/State Route 113 (SR 113) in Rocky River from 1971 to 1983.

=== Eastern Greater Cleveland alternate route ===
U.S. Route 20A
- Location: Cleveland–East Cleveland, Ohio
- Existed: 1936–1967

U.S. Route 20A (US 20A) ran along Euclid Avenue, with US 6 Alt., in Cleveland and East Cleveland from 1936 until 1967, when US 20 was removed from US 6 and run along Euclid Avenue from Superior Avenue in East Cleveland to Public Square in Cleveland.

== New York ==
=== Silver Creek truck route ===
U.S. Route 20 Truck
- Location: Silver Creek, New York

U.S. Route 20 Truck (US 20 Truck) is a truck route of US 20 in Silver Creek, New York. The road begins at an intersection with US 20 in Silver Creek, goes along Central Avenue for a short time and merges in with NY 5. The two become concurrent for another mile on Howard Street where US 20 Truck ends at an intersection with US 20.

=== New York alternate route ===
U.S. Route 20A
- Location: Big Tree–South Bloomfield, New York
- Length: 83.59 mi (134.53 km)
- Existed: c. 1939–present

U.S. Route 20A (US 20A) is an 83.59-mile (134.53 km) east–west alternate route of US 20 in western New York. It leaves US 20 in Hamburg, a suburb of Buffalo, and rejoins it in East Bloomfield about five miles (8 km) west of Canandaigua, the county seat of Ontario County. While the main line of US 20 takes a direct path between Hamburg, Buffalo, and East Bloomfield via Avon, US 20A veers to the south to serve several villages and hamlets, including the villages of Geneseo and Warsaw. US 20A was assigned c. 1939.

=== Lenox bypass route ===
U.S. Route 20 Bypass
- Location: Lenox, Massachusetts

== See also ==
- List of special routes of the United States Numbered Highway System
