= Hartrandt, Wyoming =

Census-designated place in Natrona County, Wyoming, United States

- Census-designated place
- Location within the state of Wyoming
- Coordinates: 42°52′42″N 106°21′01″W
- Country: United States
- State: Wyoming
- County: Natrona

Area
  - Total: 1.5 sq mi (4.0 km^{2})
  - Land: 1.5 sq mi (4.0 km^{2})
  - Water: 0 sq mi (0.0 km^{2})
- Elevation: 5,285 ft (1,611 m)

Population (2010)
  - Total: 693
  - Density: 450/sq mi (170/km^{2})
- Time zone: UTC-7 (Mountain (MST))
  - Summer (DST): UTC-6 (MDT)
- Area code: 307
- FIPS code: 56-35552
- GNIS feature ID: 2408355

Hartrandt is a census-designated place (CDP) in Natrona County, Wyoming, United States. It is part of the Casper, Wyoming Metropolitan Statistical Area and the population was 693 at the 2010 census.

== Geography ==
According to the United States Census Bureau, the CDP has a total area of 1.56 square miles (4.0 km^{2}), all land.

== Demographics ==
As of the census of 2000, there were 682 people, 248 households, and 183 families residing in the CDP. The population density was 446.3 people per square mile (172.1/km^{2}). There were 269 housing units at an average density of 176.0/sq mi (67.9/km^{2}). The racial makeup of the CDP was 93.40% White, 0.15% African American, 1.03% Native American, 0.44% Asian, 0.15% Pacific Islander, 0.73% from other races, and 4.11% from two or more races. Hispanic or Latino of any race were 2.20% of the population.

There were 248 households, out of which 35.9% had children under the age of 18 living with them, 57.7% were married couples living together, 8.9% had a female householder with no husband present, and 26.2% were non-families. 17.3% of all households were made up of individuals, and 6.5% had someone living alone who was 65 years of age or older. The average household size was 2.74 and the average family size was 3.09.

In the CDP, the population was spread out, with 26.8% under the age of 18, 8.7% from 18 to 24, 31.1% from 25 to 44, 24.8% from 45 to 64, and 8.7% who were 65 years of age or older. The median age was 34 years. For every 100 females, there were 110.5 males. For every 100 females age 18 and over, there were 107.1 males.

The median income for a household in the CDP was $25,694, and the median income for a family was $35,000. Males had a median income of $24,943 versus $15,625 for females. The per capita income for the CDP was $12,340. About 15.3% of families and 28.0% of the population were below the poverty line, including 55.0% of those under age 18 and 14.1% of those age 65 or over.

== See also ==
- List of census-designated places in Wyoming
