= Homa Hills, Wyoming =

- CDP
- Location within the state of Wyoming
- Coordinates: 42°59′35″N 106°22′51″W
- Country: United States
- State: Wyoming
- County: Natrona

Area
  - Total: 9.1 sq mi (24 km^{2})
  - Land: 9.1 sq mi (24 km^{2})
  - Water: 0.016 sq mi (0.041 km^{2})
- Elevation: 5,299 ft (1,615 m)

Population (2010)
  - Total: 278
  - Density: 31/sq mi (12/km^{2})
- Time zone: UTC-7 (Mountain (MST))
  - Summer (DST): UTC-6 (MDT)
- Area code: 307
- FIPS code: 56-38307
- GNIS feature ID: 2408396

Homa Hills is a census-designated place (CDP) in Natrona County, Wyoming, United States. It is part of Casper, Wyoming's Metropolitan Statistical Area. The population was 278 at the 2010 census.

== Geography ==
According to the United States Census Bureau, the CDP has a total area of 9.1 square miles (23.7 km^{2}), of which 9.1 square miles (23.6 km^{2}) is land and 0.02 square mile (0.04 km^{2}) (0.18%) is water.

== Demographics ==
As of the census of 2000, there were 214 people, 85 households, and 70 families residing in the CDP. The population density was 24.3 people per square mile (9.4/km^{2}). There were 99 housing units at an average density of 11.2/sq mi (4.3/km^{2}). The racial makeup of the CDP was 94.39% White, 0.47% Asian, and 5.14% from two or more races. Hispanic or Latino of any race were 1.87% of the population.

There were 85 households, out of which 29.4% had children under the age of 18 living with them, 67.1% were married couples living together, 10.6% had a female householder with no husband present, and 17.6% were non-families. 14.1% of all households were made up of individuals, and 4.7% had someone living alone who was 65 years of age or older. The average household size was 2.52 and the average family size was 2.70.

In the CDP, the population was spread out, with 20.6% under the age of 18, 12.6% from 18 to 24, 26.6% from 25 to 44, 31.3% from 45 to 64, and 8.9% who were 65 years of age or older. The median age was 41 years. For every 100 females, there were 98.1 males. For every 100 females age 18 and over, there were 102.4 males.

The median income for a household in the CDP was $48,828, and the median income for a family was $48,672. Males had a median income of $35,156 versus $23,333 for females. The per capita income for the CDP was $16,516. None of the families and 2.3% of the population were living below the poverty line.
