= U.S. Route 87 in Wyoming =

U.S. Highway in Wyoming

U.S. Highway 87
- US 87 highlighted in red

Route information
- Maintained by WYDOT
- Length: 364.147 mi (586.038 km)
- Existed: 1926–present

Major junctions
- South end: I-25 / US 87 at the Colorado state line near Cheyenne
- I-25 at various locations; I-80 / US 30 in Cheyenne; US 85 near Cheyenne; US 26 at Dwyer Junction; US 18 / US 20 in Orin; US 20 / US 26 in Casper; US 16 in Buffalo; I-90 at various locations; US 14 from Sheridan to Ranchester
- North end: I-90 / US 87 at the Montana state line near Ranchester

Location
- Country: United States
- State: Wyoming
- Counties: Laramie, Platte, Converse, Natrona, Johnson, Sheridan

Highway system
- United States Numbered Highway System; List; Special; Divided; Wyoming State Highway System; Interstate; US; State
← US 85	→ WYO 87
← WYO 176	→ WYO 185
← WYO 343	→ WYO 345
← WYO 345	→ WYO 350

U.S. Route 87 (US 87) is a part of the U.S. Highway System that travels Port Lavaca, Texas, north to Havre, Montana. In the state of Wyoming, it extends approximately 364 miles (586 km) from the Colorado state line south of Cheyenne to the Montana state line northwest of Ranchester. The majority of US 87 is concurrent with Interstate 25 and Interstate 90.

== Route description ==
US 87 enters Wyoming from Colorado concurrent with Interstate 25, a concurrency that begins in Raton, New Mexico, and the enter Cheyenne and intersect Interstate 80. Between exits 12 and 17 is a 4.8-mile (7.7 km) concurrency with US 85, which departs at Ranchettes. I-25 and US 87 continue 75 miles (121 km) north to Dwyer Junction, where it intersects US 26 at exit 92 and it joins the concurrency. The three routes continue 34 miles (55 km) north to Orin, where at exit 126 it intersects US 18 and US 20; US 18 terminates at the location but US 20 joins the route. I-25, US 20, US 26, and US 87 travel northward for 34 miles (55 km) to exit 160 east of Glenrock, where US 20, US 26, and US 87 follow a 27-mile (43 km) segment separate from I-25. The routes rejoin I-25 in Casper at exit 186 for 2.7 miles (4.3 km), where US 20 and US 26 split westward at exit 189. US 87 remains concurrent with I-25 northward until its terminus with Interstate 90 near Buffalo, concluding its 580-mile (930 km) concurrency over three states (unsigned in Colorado and New Mexico).

US 87 follows I-90 west for 12 miles (19 km) to exit 44, where it follows a 18-mile (29 km) section independent of another Interstate or U.S. highway, the only such section in Wyoming. A portion of US 87 was washed out in the late 1990s at the Massacre Hill Historic Site, so detour signs are posted directing US 87 traffic along WYO 193 through Story. US 87 is still officially designated through the disconnected washed out area; however the section is unsigned in favor of WYO 346 to the south and WYO 344 to the north of the washed out area.

North of WYO 193, US 87 signage resumes and it continues to Sheridan and rejoins I-90 at exit 25. I-90 and US 87 share a 16-mile (26 km) concurrency US 14 to exit 9 at Ranchester, where US 14 splits west. I-90 and US 87 continue 10 miles (16 km) northward and crosses into Montana.

== History ==
=== U.S. Route 185 ===
U.S. Route 185
- Location: Cheyenne–Casper
- Length: 124 mi (200 km)
- Existed: 1926–1934

U.S. Route 185 (US 185) was an intrastate U.S. Highway that was the main route between Cheyenne and Casper; it was replaced by U.S. Route 87 in 1936.

=== Massacre Hill washout ===
Wyoming Highway 344
- Location: Sheridan County
- Length: 1.95 mi (3.14 km)

Wyoming Highway 346
- Location: Johnson County, Sheridan County
- Length: 2.67 mi (4.30 km)

In the late 1990s, a short section of US 87 / WYO 344 at the Massacre Hill Historic Site, had been permanently closed due to recurring landslides. According to the Wyoming Department of Transportation, the stretch of roadway has ongoing and costly maintenance problems, with the most recent landslides closing the roadway as of the Spring of 1998. Because repairing the roadway could potentially damage the historic site, WYDOT recommends that through traffic use either Interstate 90 or Wyoming 193 as an alternate route.

As a result of the landslide on US 87, Wyoming petitioned the American Association of State Highway and Transportation Officials (or AASHTO) to reroute US 87 over Highway 193 in the late 1990s. However, this was denied. Consequently, a detour for US 87 follows WYO 193 since it is unlikely that US 87 will be reconstructed at its current location.

== Major intersections ==
County	Location	mi	km	Destinations	Notes
Laramie		0.000	0.000	I-25 south (US 87 south) – Fort Collins	Continuation into Colorado; continuation of I-25 concurrency; US 87 is unsigned in Colorado
See I-25 (exits 2-160)
Converse		160.834	258.837	I-25 north / I-25 BL begins – Casper	I-25 exit 160; north end of I-25 concurrency; south end of I-25 BL concurrency; continuation of US 20 (from exit 126) / US 26 (from exit 92) concurrency
Converse		162.017	260.741	WYO 90 south (Boxelder Road)	
Converse	Glenrock	165.664	266.610	I-25 BL north / WYO 95 south (4th Street) to I-25	West end of I-25 BL concurrency
Converse	Glenrock	166.183	267.446	WYO 95 north – Rolling Hills	
Natrona	Evansville	184.027	296.163	WYO 256 north (Cole Creek Road) / WYO 253 south (Hat Six Road) to I-25	
Natrona	Evansville	186.840	300.690	WYO 258 south (Curtis Street) to I-25	
Natrona	Casper	187.856– 188.189	302.325– 302.861	I-25 BL north / US 20 Bus. west / US 26 Bus. west / US 87 Bus. north (Yellowstone Street) / North Beverly Street / Bryan Stock Trail I-25 south – Cheyenne	I-25 exit 186; south end of I-25 concurrency; north end US 20 / US 26 concurrency at I-25 exit 189
See I-25 (exits 186-300)
Johnson	Buffalo	302.502	486.830	I-25 ends / I-90 east – Gillette, Rapid City	I-25 northern terminus; north end of I-25 concurrency; south end of I-90 concurrency; I-25 exit 300; I-90 exit 56B; exit numbers follow I-90
See I-90 (exits 56-44)
Johnson		314.661	506.398	I-90 west – Sheridan	I-90 exit 44; north end of I-90 concurrency
Johnson		316.401	509.198	WYO 193 north (US 87 Detour) / WYO 346 begins – Story	South end of US 87 unsigned section (disconnected); detour via WYO 193; south end of WYO 346 concurrency
Sheridan		319.071	513.495	WYO 346 ends	North end of WYO 346 concurrency
Sheridan		Section closed due to landslides			
Sheridan		321.300	517.082	WYO 344 begins	South end of WYO 344 concurrency
Sheridan		323.251	520.222	WYO 193 south (US 87 Detour) / WYO 344 ends – Story	North end of US 87 unsigned section; north end of WYO 344 concurrency
Sheridan		328.225	528.227	WYO 342 east (Made Creek Road) to I-90	
Sheridan		333.041	535.978	WYO 332 north / WYO 335 south – Big Horn	
Sheridan	Sheridan	336.992	542.336	WYO 334 west (Brundage Lane) I-90 BL west / US 14 Bus. west / US 87 Bus. north (Coffeen Avenue)	South end of I-90 BL / US 14 Bus. concurrency
Sheridan	Sheridan	337.271	542.785	I-90 east – Buffalo I-90 BL ends / US 14 Bus. ends / US 14 east – Ucross	North end of I-90 BL / US 14 Bus. concurrency; south end of I-90 / US 14 concurrency; north end of US 14 concurrency at I-90 exit 9
See I-90 (exits 25-1)
Sheridan		364.147	586.038	I-90 west / US 87 north – Hardin, Billings	Continuation into Montana
1.000 mi = 1.609 km; 1.000 km = 0.621 mi: Closed/former; Concurrency terminus

== Related routes ==
=== Special routes ===
- U.S. Route 87 Business (Cheyenne, Wyoming)
- U.S. Route 87 Business (Wheatland, Wyoming)
- U.S. Route 87 Business (Douglas, Wyoming)
- U.S. Route 87 Business (Casper, Wyoming)
- U.S. Route 87 Business (Sheridan, Wyoming)

=== Former routes ===
- Wyoming Highway 196
- Wyoming Highway 219
- Wyoming Highway 220
- Wyoming Highway 223
- Wyoming Highway 254
- Wyoming Highway 259
- Wyoming Highway 320
- Wyoming Highway 321
- Wyoming Highway 345

== See also ==
U.S. Route 87
Previous state: Colorado	Wyoming	Next state: Montana
