= List of Interstate Highways in Wyoming =

- Signage for Interstate 80, Interstate 180, and Interstate 80 Business
- Interstate Highways highlighted in red

Highway names
- Interstates: Interstate X (I-X)
- Business routes: Interstate X Business (I-X Bus.)

System links
- Wyoming State Highway System; Interstate; US; State

The Interstate Highways in Wyoming are the segments of the Dwight D. Eisenhower National System of Interstate and Defense Highways owed and maintained by the Wyoming Department of Transportation. It comprises 914 miles (1,471 km) on four routes as well as Business Interstate Highways. Construction began in September 1956 on Interstate 25 (I-25) and the network was completed in October 1985. It cost an estimated $570 million to build Wyoming's portion of the Interstate Highway System.

== Mainline highways ==
Number	Length (mi)	Length (km)	Southern or western terminus	Northern or eastern terminus	Formed	Removed	Notes
I-25	300.53	483.66	I-25 / US 87 at the Colorado state line towards Denver	I-90 / US 87 at Buffalo, Wyoming with passageways to Billings, Montana and Rapid City, South Dakota	1956	current	Runs concurrently with US 87 almost entirely in the state
I-80	402.78	648.21	I-80 / US 189 at the Utah state line towards Salt Lake City	I-80 at the Nebraska state line towards Ogallala	1956	current	Longest interstate in Wyoming; also known as the Lincoln Highway
I-90	208.80	336.03	I-90 / US 87 at the Montana state line towards Billings	I-90 / US 14 at the South Dakota state line towards Rapid City	1956	current	Only Interstate that does not serve Cheyenne
I-180	1.09	1.75	I-80 in Cheyenne	I-80 Bus. / US 30 in Cheyenne	1984	current	Highway not up to Interstate Highway standards; runs concurrently with I-25 Business, US 85, and US 87 Business in its entire length; also the only auxiliary route in Wyoming

== Business routes ==
Number	Length (mi)	Length (km)	Southern or western terminus	Northern or eastern terminus	Formed	Removed	Notes
I-25 BL	8.006	12.884	I-25/US 87 in Cheyenne	I-25/US 87 in Cheyenne	—	—	Runs entirely concurrently with US 87 Business; also runs concurrently with I-180 and US 85 entering Cheyenne
I-25 BL	3.28	5.28	I-25/US 87 and WYO 211 in Chugwater	I-25/US 87 and WYO 321 northeast of Chugwater	—	—	Entirely concurrent with WYO 313 and WYO 321
I-25 BL	4.966	7.992	I-25/US 87 in Douglas	I-25/US 87 southeast of Douglas	—	—	Entirely concurrent with US 20 Business, US 26 Business, and US 87 Business
I-25 BL	6.98	11.23	I-25/US 87 southwest of Glenrock	I-25/US 20/US 26/US 87 southeast of Glenrock	—	—	Runs concurrently with County Road 19 entering Glenrock and then US 20 and US 26 heading east of Glenrock
I-25 BL	2.180	3.508	I-25/US 87 in Casper	I-25/US 20/US 26/US 87 east of Casper	—	—	Unsigned; entirely concurrent with US 87 Business; also runs concurrently with unsigned WYO 255, US 20, and US 26
I-25 BL	1.673	2.692	I-25/US 87 south of Buffalo	I-90/US 87 north of Buffalo	—	—	Entirely concurrent with US 87 Business; also runs concurrently with I-90 Business and WYO 196
I-80 BL	3.150	5.069	I-80/US 189 west of Evanston	I-80/US 189 east of Evanston	—	—	Entirely concurrent with US 189 Business; also runs concurrently with WYO 89
I-80 BL	15.630	25.154	I-80 west of Fort Bridger	I-80 east of Lyman	—	—	Longest Interstate business route in Wyoming; also the only business route in Wyoming not concurrent with another route
I-80 BL	2.5	4.0	I-80/US 30 northwest of Green River	I-80/US 30 east of Green River	—	—	Entirely concurrent with US 30 Business; also runs concurrently with WYO 374
I-80 BL	4.120	6.630	I-80/US 30/US 191 west of Rock Springs	I-80/US 30 northeast of Rock Springs	—	—	Entirely concurrent with US 30 Business
I-80 BL	3.770	6.067	I-80/US 30 west of Rawlins	I-80/US 30/US 287	—	—	Entirely concurrent with US 30 Business; also runs concurrently with US 287
I-80 BL	6.357	10.231	I-80 in Laramie	I-80/US 30 east of Laramie	—	—	Runs concurrently with US 30, US 287, and County Road 322 north of Laramie
I-80 BL	6.935	11.161	I-80 west of Cheyenne	I-80/US 30 east of Cheyenne	—	—	Entirely concurrent with US 30
I-90 BL	5.4	8.7	I-90/US 14/US 87 north of Sheridan	I-90 southeast of Sheridan	—	—	Entirely concurrent with US 14; also runs concurrently with US 87
I-90 BL	2.2	3.5	I-90/US 87 north of Buffalo	I-90 east of Buffalo	—	—	Runs concurrently with I-25 Business, WYO 196, US 87 Business, and then US 16
I-90 BL	3.3	5.3	I-90 west of Gillette	I-90/US 14/US 16 east of Gillette	—	—	Runs concurrently with US 14 and US 16 almost in its entire length; also runs concurrently with WYO 50 and WYO 59
I-90 BL	1.6	2.6	I-90 northwest of Moorcroft	I-90 in Moorcroft	—	—	Unsigned; runs concurrently with US 14 and US 16 entering Moorcroft
I-90 BL	3.4	5.5	I-90 southwest of Sundance	I-90 east of Sundance	—	—	Entirely concurrent with US 14
