= Mills, Wyoming =

City in Natronal County, Wyoming, United States

- City
- Location of Mills in Natrona County, Wyoming
- Coordinates: 42°51′02″N 106°22′48″W
- Country: United States
- State: Wyoming
- County: Natrona

Area
  - Total: 2.99 sq mi (7.74 km^{2})
  - Land: 2.96 sq mi (7.67 km^{2})
  - Water: 0.027 sq mi (0.07 km^{2})
- Elevation: 5,125 ft (1,562 m)

Population (2020)
  - Total: 4,034
  - Density: 1,343.3/sq mi (518.64/km^{2})
- Time zone: UTC-7 (Mountain (MST))
  - Summer (DST): UTC-6 (MDT)
- ZIP codes: 82604, 82644
- Area code: 307
- FIPS code: 56-53460
- GNIS feature ID: 2413001
- Website: millswy.gov

Mills is a city in Natrona County, Wyoming, United States. It is part of the Casper, Wyoming Metropolitan Statistical Area. The population was 4,034 at the 2020 census, up from 3,461 at the 2010 census.

== Geography ==
Mills is located at 42°50′49″N 106°22′43″W (42.846815, -106.378658).

According to the United States Census Bureau, the town has a total area of 2.18 square miles (5.65 km^{2}), of which 2.15 square miles (5.57 km^{2}) is land and 0.03 square miles (0.08 km^{2}) is water.

== Demographics ==
Historical population
Census	Pop.	Note	%±
1930	357		—
1940	379		6.2%
1950	866		128.5%
1960	1,477		70.6%
1970	1,724		16.7%
1980	2,139		24.1%
1990	1,574		−26.4%
2000	2,591		64.6%
2010	3,461		33.6%
2020	4,034		16.6%
2023 (est.)	4,517	▲	12.0%

=== 2010 census ===
As of the census of 2010, there were 3,461 people, 1,513 households, and 894 families residing in the town. The population density was 1,609.8 inhabitants per square mile (621.5/km^{2}). There were 1,654 housing units at an average density of 769.3 per square mile (297.0/km^{2}). The racial makeup of the town was 94.0% White, 0.4% African American, 1.5% Native American, 0.2% Asian, 1.9% from other races, and 2.1% from two or more races. Hispanic or Latino of any race were 6.5% of the population.

There were 1,513 households, of which 30.1% had children under the age of 18 living with them, 35.2% were married couples living together, 15.5% had a female householder with no husband present, 8.4% had a male householder with no wife present, and 40.9% were non-families. 31.7% of all households were made up of individuals, and 9.8% had someone living alone who was 65 years of age or older. The average household size was 2.29 and the average family size was 2.82.

The median age in the town was 38.6 years. 23.1% of residents were under the age of 18; 9% were between the ages of 18 and 24; 25.4% were from 25 to 44; 28.1% were from 45 to 64; and 14.3% were 65 years of age or older. The gender makeup of the town was 50.5% male and 49.5% female.

=== 2000 census ===
As of the census of 2000, there were 2,591 people, 1,161 households, and 700 families residing in the town. The population density was 1,555.4 people per square mile (599.0/km^{2}). There were 1,272 housing units at an average density of 763.6 per square mile (294.1/km^{2}). The racial makeup of the town was 93.98% White, 0.46% African American, 1.51% Native American, 0.23% Asian, 0.04% Pacific Islander, 1.93% from other races, and 1.85% from two or more races. Hispanic or Latino of any race were 3.94% of the population.

There were 1,161 households, out of which 26.1% had children under the age of 18 living with them, 43.2% were married couples living together, 11.3% had a female householder with no husband present, and 39.7% were non-families. 31.4% of all households were made up of individuals, and 9.8% had someone living alone who was 65 years of age or older. The average household size was 2.23 and the average family size was 2.75.

In the town, the population was spread out, with 22.5% under the age of 18, 10.8% from 18 to 24, 30.4% from 25 to 44, 22.5% from 45 to 64, and 13.8% who were 65 years of age or older. The median age was 38 years. For every 100 females, there were 102.7 males. For every 100 females age 18 and over, there were 100.7 males.

The median income for a household in the town was $26,717, and the median income for a family was $33,105. Males had a median income of $29,728 versus $20,945 for females. The per capita income for the town was $14,103. About 16.2% of families and 18.4% of the population were below the poverty line, including 20.0% of those under age 18 and 13.6% of those age 65 or over.

== Education ==
Public education in the town of Mills is provided by Natrona County School District #1.

== See also ==
- List of municipalities in Wyoming
