= Glendo, Wyoming =

- Town
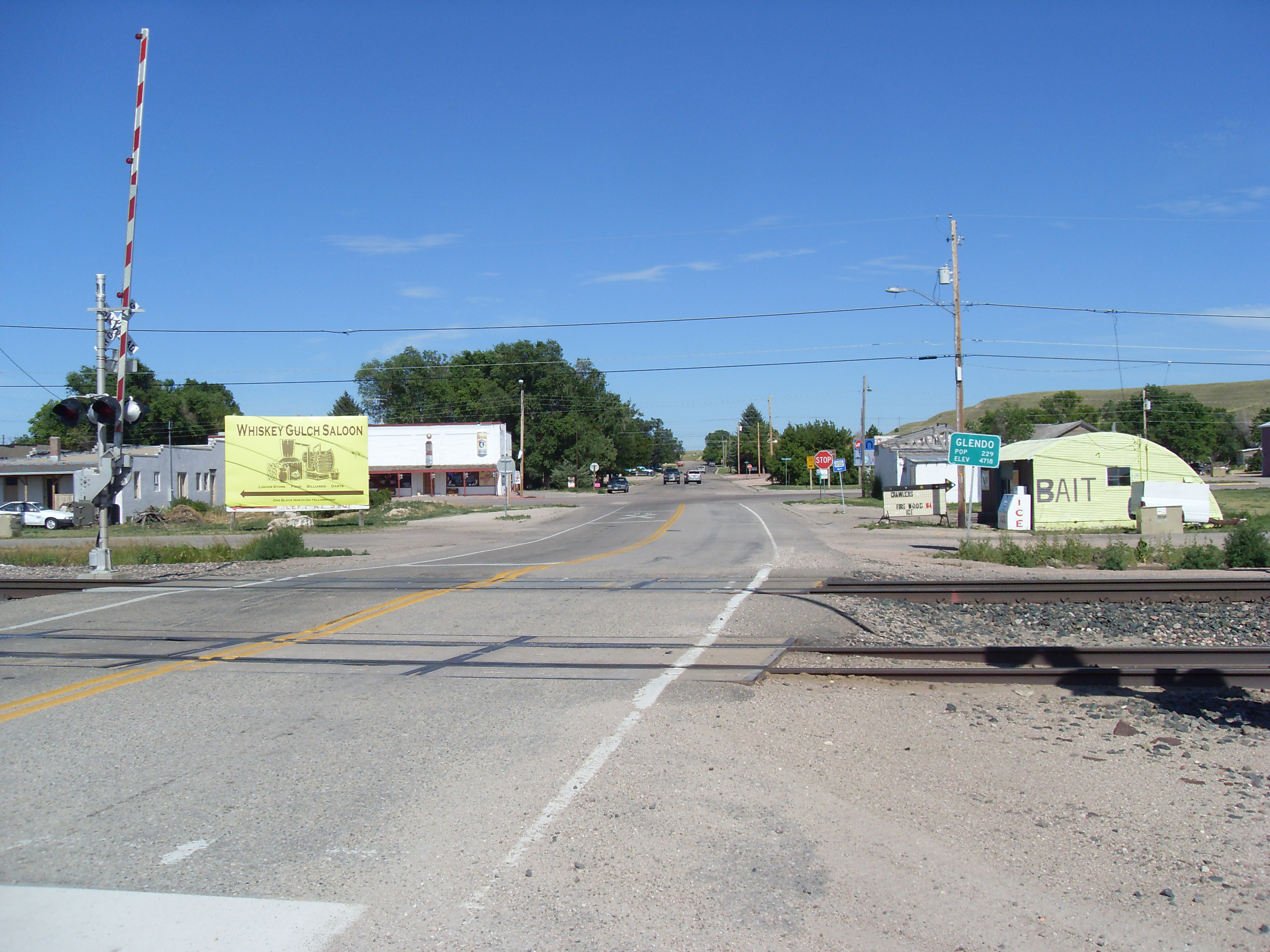
- Looking east on A Street in Glendo, July 2010
- Motto: "Small in Number - Big in Heart"
- Location of Glendo in Platte County, Wyoming.
- Coordinates: 42°30′06″N 105°01′28″W
- Country: United States
- State: Wyoming
- County: Platte

Area
  - Total: 0.59 sq mi (1.53 km^{2})
  - Land: 0.59 sq mi (1.53 km^{2})
  - Water: 0 sq mi (0.00 km^{2})
- Elevation: 4,724 ft (1,440 m)

Population (2020)
  - Total: 237
  - Density: 340.8/sq mi (131.59/km^{2})
- Time zone: UTC-7 (Mountain (MST))
  - Summer (DST): UTC-6 (MDT)
- ZIP code: 82213
- Area code: 307
- FIPS code: 56-32290
- GNIS feature ID: 2412686
- Website: townofglendo.com

Glendo is a town in Platte County, Wyoming, United States. As of the 2020 census, Glendo had a population of 237.

== History ==
The town was incorporated in 1922. The California Trail, Oregon Trail and Mormon Trail passed south of Glendo. The Overland Stage Line also passed south of Glendo.

It was in a cabin near the town that William L. Carlisle, one of America's last train robbers, was captured in December 1919 after a shoot-out with the posse pursuing him.

On August 21, 2017, Glendo was directly in the middle of the path of a total solar eclipse, the first over the continental United States since 1979. Like many locations inside the path of totality, thousands of eager tourists and eclipse chasers flocked into Glendo to witness the event.

== Geography ==
According to the United States Census Bureau, the town has a total area of 0.53 square miles (1.37 km^{2}), all land.

== Demographics ==
Historical population
Census	Pop.	Note	%±
1930	201		—
1940	162		−19.4%
1950	215		32.7%
1960	292		35.8%
1970	210		−28.1%
1980	367		74.8%
1990	195		−46.9%
2000	229		17.4%
2010	205		−10.5%
2020	237		15.6%
U.S. Decennial Census

=== 2010 census ===
As of the census of 2010, there were 205 people, 101 households, and 59 families residing in the town. The population density was 386.8 inhabitants per square mile (149.3/km^{2}). There were 167 housing units at an average density of 315.1 per square mile (121.7/km^{2}). The racial makeup of the town was 97.1% White, 1.0% Native American, 1.0% from other races, and 1.0% from two or more races. Hispanic or Latino of any race were 3.4% of the population.

There were 101 households, of which 16.8% had children under the age of 18 living with them, 52.5% were married couples living together, 5.9% had a female householder with no husband present, and 41.6% were non-families. 37.6% of all households were made up of individuals, and 15.8% had someone living alone who was 65 years of age or older. The average household size was 2.03 and the average family size was 2.68.

The median age in the town was 52.1 years. 17.1% of residents were under the age of 18; 2.9% were between the ages of 18 and 24; 14.6% were from 25 to 44; 40.9% were from 45 to 64; and 24.4% were 65 years of age or older. The gender makeup of the town was 48.8% male and 51.2% female.

=== 2000 census ===
As of the census of 2000, there were 229 people, 110 households, and 66 families residing in the town. The population density was 431.5 people per square mile (166.8/km^{2}). There were 165 housing units at an average density of 310.9 per square mile (120.2/km^{2}). The racial makeup of the town was 95.20% White, 0.44% Native American, 2.18% from other races, and 2.18% from two or more races. Hispanic or Latino of any race were 5.24% of the population.

There were 110 households, out of which 16.4% had children under the age of 18 living with them, 52.7% were married couples living together, 4.5% had a female householder with no husband present, and 39.1% were non-families. 32.7% of all households were made up of individuals, and 15.5% had someone living alone who was 65 years of age or older. The average household size was 2.08 and the average family size was 2.55.

In the town, the population was spread out, with 14.8% under the age of 18, 7.9% from 18 to 24, 21.4% from 25 to 44, 31.9% from 45 to 64, and 24.0% who were 65 years of age or older. The median age was 50 years. For every 100 females, there were 100.9 males. For every 100 females age 18 and over, there were 105.3 males.

The median income for a household in the town was $24,531, and the median income for a family was $26,786. Males had a median income of $21,146 versus $15,000 for females. The per capita income for the town was $14,529. About 2.4% of families and 9.0% of the population were below the poverty line, including 7.1% of those under the age of eighteen and 2.7% of those 65 or over.

== Parks and recreation ==
=== Glendo State Park ===
Glendo is near Glendo State Park, one of several state recreation areas along the North Platte River in Wyoming. The park surrounds Glendo Reservoir, which is a popular location for water sports and fishing.

== Education ==
Public education in the town of Glendo is provided by Platte County School District #1. Glendo Schools, a K-12 campus, serves the town.

Glendo has a public library, a branch of the Platte County Public Library System.

== See also ==
- List of towns in Wyoming
