= Orin, Wyoming =

- CDP
- Location within Wyoming
- Coordinates: 42°39′02″N 105°10′57″W
- Country: United States
- State: Wyoming
- County: Converse

Area
  - Total: 1.1 sq mi (2.9 km^{2})
  - Land: 1.0 sq mi (2.6 km^{2})
  - Water: 0.12 sq mi (.3 km^{2})
- Elevation: 4,705 ft (1,434 m)

Population (2020)
  - Total: 52
  - Density: 52/sq mi (20/km^{2})
- Time zone: UTC-7 (Mountain (MST))
  - Summer (DST): UTC-6 (MDT)
- Area code: 307
- FIPS code: 56-58100
- GNIS feature ID: 2629279

Orin is a census-designated place (CDP) in Converse County, Wyoming, United States. The population was 52 at the 2020 census.

== History ==
The community was named for Orin Hughitt, the uncle of a railroad official. A post office was established at the Orin Junction in 1891. The name was changed to Orin in 1895, and the post office closed in about 1962.

Orin was the final place outlaw Doc Middleton owned and operated a saloon, before dying in the local jail in 1913.

== Geography ==
The community is located at the intersection of Interstate 25/U.S. Route 26/U.S. Route 87 and U.S. Route 18/U.S. Route 20. Orin is approximately 10 miles (16 km) southeast of Douglas. A BNSF Railway line runs through the community.

According to the United States Census Bureau, the CDP has a total area of 1.1 square miles (2.9 km^{2}), with 1.0 square mile (2.6 km^{2}) is land and 0.1 square mile (0.26 km^{2}) (9.1%) is water.
