= Wyoming Department of Transportation =

Government agency in Wyoming, United States

- Official logo of WYDOT

Agency overview
- Formed: 1991; 35 years ago
- Preceding agency: Wyoming Highway Department
- Jurisdiction: State of Wyoming
- Headquarters: 5300 Bishop Boulevard Cheyenne, Wyoming (307) 777-4375
- Employees: Nearly 2,000
- Agency executive: Darin Westby, Director
- Child agency: Wyoming Highway Patrol
- Website: dot.state.wy.us

The Wyoming Department of Transportation (WYDOT) is the state agency that manages transportation infrastructure and services in Wyoming. According to its official mission statement: "It aims to provide a safe, high quality, and efficient transportation system."

WYDOT employs nearly 2,000 people across approximately 60 locations, making it one of the larger government agencies in the state. Its functions include road planning and maintenance, driver licensing and vehicle registration, aviation support, and coordination between its various divisions, including the Wyoming Highway Patrol.

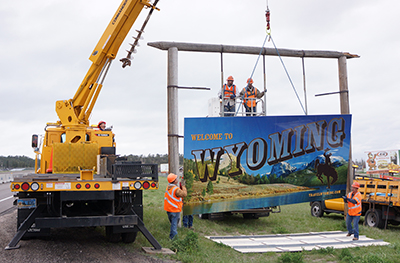
Wyoming Department of Transportation employees put up a new welcome sign in the Spring of 2017.

WYDOT headquarters are located in northwest Cheyenne adjacent to the Central Avenue Interchange (exit 12) on I-25. In addition, road construction and maintenance operations are divided among five field districts, headquartered in Basin, Casper, Laramie, Rock Springs, and Sheridan.

WYDOT was formed in 1991, incorporating the Wyoming Highway Department, along with the Wyoming Aeronautics Commission and transportation-related elements of the Wyoming Department of Revenue and Taxation and the Wyoming Public Service Commission.

The old Highway Department had existed since 1917, when it was created in response to the Federal Aid Road Act of 1916, in which Congress decreed that as a prerequisite for the receipt of federal funds, a state must have a highway department (or similar agency) in place and functioning. Until that time, road improvements were the responsibility of local governments.

During the 1920s, as the pace of road improvement picked up, so did the need for maintenance. In Wyoming, the initial maintenance work was very basic in nature and carried on only during the summer. Winter motor travel was practically unknown in those days, consequently the agency's maintenance forces were laid off in the fall of the year, with only a few mechanics retained to overhaul equipment.

== Winter maintenance begins ==
Winter maintenance and snow removal outside of the mountainous areas was first undertaken on a large scale in the fall of 1929. Some snow removal on a very limited mileage had been carried on since the Department bought its first snowplow in 1923, but the agency had acquired only 13 plows up until 1929. That year, another 33 plows were purchased.

By then, it was becoming obvious that taking steps to effective reduce snow drifting and accumulation on the roads was just as important as snow removal. The department began engineering grade raises, wider rights of way, removal of guardrail and similar drift-causing structures, and the first snow fences were erected during this era.

== 1930s: Paving work accelerated ==
While during the 1920s, the focus was mainly on "getting out of the mud;" with improvements consisting of improving drainage and topping roads with gravel. By the 1930s the Highway Department had raised its sights to providing durable all-weather surfacing.

An excerpt from the department's 1930 annual report read, "The construction of … low-style surfaces such as gravel shale and crushed stone ... has only provided a temporary solution to the problems of providing adequate highways. Increasing traffic … has made it impossible to satisfactorily maintain the traffic-bound gravel road ... There is a continuing loss of surfacing material which is expensive and often difficult to replace."

Initially, the remedy was 'oiling,' whereby heavy asphaltic oil was sprayed atop a layer of gravel or other base material; a process was also referred to as 'inverted penetration." Oiling was soon supplanted by paving with bituminous mix (asphalt), a process still in wide use. Paving with concrete was also performed, albeit on a limited basis initially. (Concrete is now used more commonly, primarily in urban or high traffic rural settings.) By 1939, more than 90 percent of the state highway system had been paved.

== Wyoming Highway Patrol organized ==
During the 1920s and early 1930s, Wyoming had a state 'Department of Law Enforcement' in place, mainly to enforce Prohibition. Over time, agents became increasingly busy enforcing motor vehicle laws, so when Prohibition ended, the need was apparent for some sort of regulation and enforcement authority on the highway with its steadily increasing traffic, including commercial vehicle regulation.

In response, the Wyoming Legislature authorized creation of the Wyoming Highway Patrol, effective June 1, 1933. Capt. George Smith, the first Patrol director, was also a visionary, pushing for a state speed limit and a driver licensing law years before they became a reality. Primarily for logistical reasons, the Highway Patrol was affiliated the Highway Department, and that association has continued to the modern day.

== Evolution of Aeronautics Commission's function ==
The Wyoming Legislature established the Aeronautics Commission in 1937, with an initial focus on conducting search and rescue and enforcing licensing requirements. The role of Aeronautics has evolved to where its Commission's primary job has become one of disbursing state funds to maintain and improve runways and buildings needed for cargo shipping, air taxis and ambulances, military transport, and commercial flights. Federal deregulation of airlines in 1978, as well as Wyoming state government reorganization in the early 1990s, were significant factors in changing the Commission's role and authority.

== Interstate highway construction ==
After years of planning and no small amount of political maneuvering, construction of the Interstate highway system began after Congress passed the Federal Aid Highway Act of 1956. By 1960, interstate construction was going strong in Wyoming. In Wyoming 62 sections of new four-lane highway, encompassing nearly 600 miles (970 km) (about two-thirds of the ultimate system) opened to traffic between 1960 and 1969. This busy decade of Interstate construction was topped off on Oct. 3, 1970 with the opening of the 77 miles (124 km) Walcott Junction-Laramie segment of Interstate 80. This was longest single section of new interstate opened at one time, not only in Wyoming, but also anywhere in the U.S. The last gap in Wyoming's interstate system was closed in October 1985.

Currently, there are 33,000 miles (53,000 km) of public roadways in Wyoming. WYDOT manages 6,859 miles (11,038 km) of road, of which only 405 miles (652 km) are considered urban highways. There are 914 miles (1,471 km) of interstates in Wyoming.

Wyoming has 10 intercity bus organizations, serving 38 cities. There are 23 counties within Wyoming which have a total of 41 public transit systems. There are approximately 2,000 miles (3,200 km) of rail in Wyoming, 100 miles (160 km) which are state-owned. Wyoming has nine primary service airports.

Wyoming has one of the nation's lowest fuel tax rates at 14 cents per gallon, which generates approximately $6.65 million per year.

== See also ==
- List of state highways in Wyoming
- Outline of Wyoming
- U.S. Department of Transportation
- Vehicle registration plates of Wyoming
