= National Register of Historic Places listings in Platte County, Wyoming =

Location of Platte County in Wyoming

This is a list of the National Register of Historic Places listings in Platte County, Wyoming.

It is intended to be a complete list of the properties and districts on the National Register of Historic Places in Platte County, Wyoming, United States. The locations of National Register properties and districts for which the latitude and longitude coordinates are included below, may be seen in a map.

There are 14 properties and districts listed on the National Register in the county, three of which are National Historic Landmarks. One previous listing has been removed from the Register.

This National Park Service list is complete through NPS recent listings posted December 19, 2025.

Contents: Counties in Wyoming
Albany - Big Horn - Campbell - Carbon - Converse - Crook - Fremont - Goshen - Hot Springs - Johnson - Laramie - Lincoln - Natrona - Niobrara - Park - Platte - Sheridan - Sublette - Sweetwater - Teton - Uinta - Washakie - Weston

== Current listings ==
	Name on the Register	Image	Date listed	Location	City or town	Description
1	Chugwater Soda Fountain	Chugwater Soda Fountain	June 21, 2022 (#100007867)	314 1st St. 41°45′24″N 104°49′17″W	Chugwater	Wyoming's oldest operating soda shop, Chugwater's oldest operating business, and an important local social hub established in 1927 in a commercial building dating to 1914.
2	Diamond Ranch		September 28, 1984 (#84003696)	1247 Diamond Rd. 41°44′45″N 105°03′15″W	Chugwater vicinity	Ranch established in 1878 by architect George D. Rainsford; noted for its substantial stone buildings, contributions to fine horse breeding, and later use as a guest ranch.
3	EWZ Bridge over East Channel of Laramie River	EWZ Bridge over East Channel of Laramie River	February 22, 1985 (#85000431)	Palmer Canyon Rd. 42°02′40″N 105°09′00″W	Wheatland vicinity	Pin-connected, five-panel Pratt pony truss built 1913–14; an early example of a commonly used bridge type in Wyoming. Replaced.
4	Duncan Grant Ranch Rural Historic Landscape	Duncan Grant Ranch Rural Historic Landscape	February 27, 2013 (#13000047)	778 Sybille Creek Rd. 41°58′36″N 105°04′31″W	Wheatland vicinity	8,000-acre (3,200 ha) ranch established in 1874 whose 23 contributing properties illustrate the typical spatial organization and land use patterns of southeast Wyoming ranches.
5	Robert Grant Ranch		September 7, 1995 (#95001073)	433 Richeau Rd. 41°50′52″N 104°56′27″W	Wheatland vicinity	Mid-sized ranch established in 1891, with a typical mix of vernacular buildings constructed on site and repurposed buildings from other ranches, comprising 12 contributing properties that also include a rare surviving plunge dip.
6	Guernsey Lake Park	Guernsey Lake Park	August 26, 1980 (#80004051)	2187 Lake Side Dr. 42°17′15″N 104°45′32″W	Guernsey	1927 dam complex and 1930s park buildings and structures created by the Civilian Conservation Corps, including a museum with innovative educational displays. Designated a National Historic Landmark District on September 25, 1997.
7	Oregon Trail Ruts	Oregon Trail Ruts	October 15, 1966 (#66000761)	off Lucinda Rollins Rd. 42°15′21″N 104°44′54″W	Guernsey	Wheel ruts and roadcuts incised across a series of sandstone outcrops 1841–1869, leaving the best preserved ruts of the Emigrant Trail. Preserved as a state historic site.
8	Patten Creek Site	Patten Creek Site	September 11, 1989 (#89001204)	Address restricted	Hartville vicinity	Long-used site for the procurement and fabrication of stone tools, with three distinct Archaic period layers predominating.
9	Platte County Courthouse	Platte County Courthouse	October 15, 2008 (#08001004)	800 9th St. 42°03′21″N 104°57′10″W	Wheatland	Prominent 1917 courthouse significant for its exemplary Neoclassical architecture and association with Platte County's early-20th-century political development.
10	Powars II Paleoindian Hematite Quarry	Powars II Paleoindian Hematite Quarry	May 6, 2021 (#100006494)	Address restricted	Sunrise vicinity	North America's only known prehistoric hematite quarry, containing one of the continent's largest assemblages of Paleoindian artifacts, comprising stone, bone, and antler tools used 13,000–11,000 years ago.
11	Register Cliff	Register Cliff	April 3, 1970 (#70000674)	off S. Guernsey Rd. 42°14′54″N 104°42′37″W	Guernsey	Landmark cliff along the Emigrant Trail in Wyoming on which pioneers carved their names in the 1840s and '50s. A state historic site since 1932.
12	Sunrise Mine Historic District	Sunrise Mine Historic District	December 23, 2005 (#05000925)	Wyoming Highway 318; 42°19′55″N 104°42′11″W	Sunrise	Unusually intact mine complex and company town with 35 contributing properties built 1898–1955, attracting European and Asian workers and sustaining the area's economy.
13	Swan Land and Cattle Company Headquarters	Swan Land and Cattle Company Headquarters	October 15, 1966 (#66000760)	18 Happy Hollow Rd. 41°45′18″N 104°49′09″W	Chugwater	Row of four buildings constructed 1876–1918, comprising the headquarters of one of the largest ranching operations in the U.S., founded by Scottish investors in 1883.
14	Wheatland Downtown Historic District	Wheatland Downtown Historic District	March 19, 2021 (#100006269)	9th St. from Walnut to Water Sts., and Gilchrist St. from 8th to 9th Sts. 42°03′16″N 104°57′12″W	Wheatland	Economic and governmental heart of Wheatland, with 24 contributing properties built 1903–1963.

== Former listing ==
	Name on the Register	Image	Date listed	Date removed	Location	City or town	Description
1	Wheatland Railroad Depot		February 16, 1996 (#96000077)	September 5, 2017	701 Gilchrist Ave. 42°03′15″N 104°57′03″W	Wheatland	1895 train station, the hub for incoming settlers and outgoing agricultural products. Demolished.

== See also ==
- List of National Historic Landmarks in Wyoming
- National Register of Historic Places listings in Wyoming
