= Grant House =

Grant House may refer to:

== In Australia ==
- Grant House, Beaumaris, a heritage-listed house in Beaumaris, Melbourne, Victoria

== In the United States ==
- Grant-Humphreys Mansion, Denver, Colorado, listed on the U.S. National Register of Historic Places (NRHP) and a Denver Landmark
- Grant House (Denver, Colorado), 100 S. Franklin Street, a Denver Landmark, Colorado
- Ebenezer Grant House, East Windsor Hill, Connecticut, NRHP-listed
- Ulysses S. Grant Home, Galena, Illinois, NHRP-listed
- Douglas and Charlotte Grant House, Marion, Iowa, NRHP-listed
- George Grant Villa, Victoria, Kansas, listed on the NRHP in Ellis County
- Stone-Grant House, Georgetown, Kentucky, listed on the NRHP in Scott County
- George W. Grant House, Lexington, Kentucky, listed on the NRHP in Fayette County
- Lindenberger-Grant House, Lyndon, Kentucky, listed on the NRHP in Jefferson County
- Grant-Black House, New Orleans, Louisiana, listed on the NRHP in Orleans Parish
- Peter Grant House, Farmingdale, Maine, listed on the NRHP in Kennebec County
- William F. Grant House, North Vassalboro, Maine, listed on the NRHP in Kennebec County
- Grant Family House, Saco, Maine, listed on the NRHP in York County
- Benjamin Grant House, Ipswich, Massachusetts, NRHP-listed
- Grant House (Rush City, Minnesota), Rush City, Minnesota, listed on the NRHP in Chisago County
- Grant-Kohrs Ranch/Warren Ranch, Deer Lodge, Montana, listed on the NRHP in Powell County
- Grant-Kohrs Ranch National Historic Site, Deer Lodge, Montana, NRHP-listed
- Grant Cottage, Mount McGregor, New York, where Ulysses S. Grant died
- Grant Houses, a housing project named for Ulysses S. Grant, in New York
- Ulysses S. Grant Boyhood Home, Georgetown, Ohio, NRHP-listed
- A.G. Grant Homestead, Grove City, Ohio, NRHP-listed
- William H. Grant House (Middleport, Ohio), NRHP-listed
- Henry M. Grant House, Portland, Oregon, NRHP-listed
- O.B. Grant House, Ridgway Township, Pennsylvania, NRHP-listed
- Grant-Lee Hall, Harrogate, Tennessee, listed on the NRHP in Claiborne County
- William H. Grant House (Richmond, Virginia), NRHP-listed
- Grant House (Vancouver, Washington), the former commanding officer's residence on Officers Row, part of Vancouver Barracks and Fort Vancouver National Historic Site
- Paul S. Grant House, Whitefish Bay, Wisconsin, listed on the NRHP in Milwaukee County
- Robert Grant Ranch, Wheatland, Wyoming, listed on the NRHP in Platte County

== People ==
- Grant House (swimmer), an American swimmer and gold medalist at the 2015 FINA World Junior Swimming Championships

== See also ==
- William H. Grant House (disambiguation)
