= Lance Creek, Wyoming =

- CDP
- Location in Niobrara County and the state of Wyoming
- Coordinates: 43°01′50″N 104°39′24″W
- Country: United States
- State: Wyoming
- County: Niobrara

Area
  - Total: 42.0 sq mi (109 km^{2})
  - Land: 41.9 sq mi (109 km^{2})
  - Water: 0.01 sq mi (0.026 km^{2})
- Elevation: 4,475 ft (1,364 m)

Population (2020)
  - Total: 43
  - Density: 1.0/sq mi (0.40/km^{2})
- Time zone: UTC-7 (Mountain (MST))
  - Summer (DST): UTC-6 (MDT)
- ZIP Code: 82222
- Area code: 307
- FIPS code: 56-44615
- GNIS feature ID: 2408571

Lance Creek is a census-designated place (CDP) in Niobrara County, Wyoming, United States. The population was 43 at the 2020 census. Lance Creek is the namesake of the Lance Formation, a rock formation from the Late Cretaceous that has yielded fossils from a diverse number of species.

== Geography ==
According to the United States Census Bureau, the CDP has a total area of 42.0 square miles (108.8 km^{2}), of which 42.0 square miles (108.8 km^{2}) is land and 0.026% is water.

== Demographics ==
At the 2000 census, there were 51 people, 21 households and 17 families residing in the CDP. The population density was 1.2 per square mile (0.5/km^{2}). There were 53 housing units at an average density of 1.3/sq mi (0.5/km^{2}). The racial makeup of the CDP was 96.08% White, and 3.92% from two or more races. Hispanic or Latino of any race were 3.92% of the population.

There were 21 households, of which 19.0% had children under the age of 18 living with them, 76.2% were married couples living together, 4.8% had a female householder with no husband present, and 14.3% were non-families. 4.8% of all households were made up of individuals, and none had someone living alone who was 65 years of age or older. The average household size was 2.43 and the average family size was 2.56.

17.6% of the population were under the age of 18, 2.0% from 18 to 24, 21.6% from 25 to 44, 37.3% from 45 to 64, and 21.6% who were 65 years of age or older. The median age was 49 years. For every 100 females, there were 104.0 males. For every 100 females age 18 and over, there were 100.0 males.

The median household income was $36,250 and the median family income was $36,250. Males had a median income of $26,875 versus $16,250 for females. The per capita income for the CDP was $14,419. None of the population or the families were below the poverty line.

== Education ==
Public education in Lance Creek is provided by Niobrara County School District #1. Schools serving the community include Lance Creek School (grades K-3), Lusk Elementary/Middle School (grades K-8), Niobrara County High School (grades 9–12).

== Highways ==
- WYO 270 (Lance Creek Hwy.) – connects to U.S. Highway 85 ten miles east of Lance Creek, and to U.S. 20 fifteen miles south of town in Manville.
- WYO 271 (20 Mile Rd.) – route running west out of Lance Creek, to the West Lance Creek area.
- WYO 272 (No. Lance Creek Rd.) – route running north out of Lance Creek, serving several area ranches, and to Thunder Basin National Grassland.
