= Wyoming Highway 270 =

State highway in Platte and Niobrara counties in Wyoming, United States

Wyoming Highway 270
- WYO 270 highlighted in red

Route information
- Maintained by WYDOT
- Length: 73.37 mi (118.08 km)

Major junctions
- South end: US 26 in Guernsey
- US 18 / US 20 in Manville
- North end: US 18 / US 85

Location
- Country: United States
- State: Wyoming
- Counties: Platte, Niobrara

Highway system
- Wyoming State Highway System; Interstate; US; State
← WYO 259	→ WYO 271
← WYO 317	→ WYO 319

Wyoming Highway 270 (WYO 270) is a 73.37-mile (118.08 km) north–south state highway in northeastern Platte and southwestern Niobrara counties in Wyoming, United States, that connects U.S. Route 26 (US 26), east of Guernsey with U.S. Route 18 / U.S. Route 85 (US 85), east of Lance Creek.

== Route description ==
=== Guernsey to Manville ===
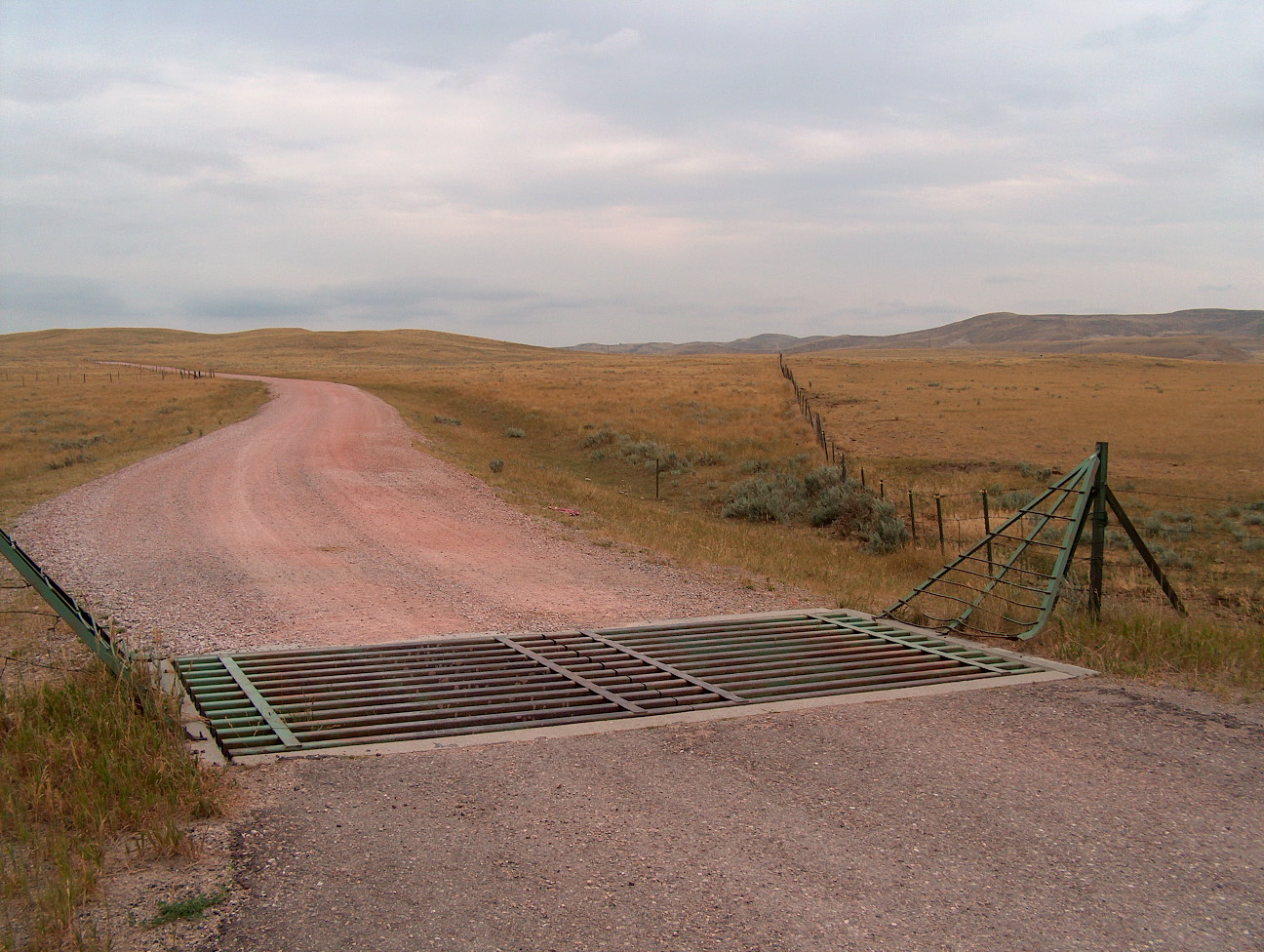
Ranch road leaving Highway 270 in Platte County, August 2006

WYO 270 starts at its southern end in Platte County at US 26 just east of Guernsey. From here it heads north as Hartville Highway on its way to the town of the same name. WYO 270 reaches Hartville at approximately 4.5 miles (7.2 km), and intersects the western terminus of Wyoming Highway 318 (Main Street). WYO 270 continues north, leaving Hartville to head north to Manville and Lance Creek. At almost 40 miles (64 km), WYO 270 intersects US 18 / U.S. Route 20 (US. 20) just before entering Manville. Upon entering Manville, the former Wyoming Highway 274 (9th Avenue) is intersected. Highway 274 was designated for the old alignment of US 18 / US 20, but was decommissioned in the early 1990s.

=== Manville to end ===
North of Manville, WYO 270 heads to Lance Creek and intersects the eastern terminus of Wyoming Highway 271 (Twentymile Road). WYO 270 then begins to turn east as the last length of its routing is primarily east–west. Wyoming Highway 272 (North Lance Creek Road) is intersected at just under 61 miles (98 km). At just over 73 miles (117 km), WYO 270 reaches its northern (or eastern) end at US 18 / US 85 north of Lusk.

== History ==
The section of WYO 270 from US 26 at Guernsey north to Hartville at present day Wyoming Highway 318 was formerly designated as Wyoming Highway 318 (WYO 318) prior to the 1970s. WYO 318 used to begin as US 26 at Guernsey and end at Sunrise with a 90 degree turn at Hartville. The stretch between Guernsey and Hartville was recommissioned as Wyoming Highway 270 when that road was completed between Manville and Hartville.

== Major intersections ==
County	Location	mi	km	Destinations	Notes
Platte		0.00	0.00	US 26 east (Heartland Expy) – Fort Laramie, Torrington US 26 west (Heartland Expy) – Guernsey, Wheatland, Douglas	Southern terminus; T intersection
Platte	Hartville	4.53	7.29	WYO 318 east (Main St) – Sunrise	T intersection; western end of WYO 318
Niobrara		39.55	63.65	US 18 east / US 20 east – Lusk, Van Tassell US 18 west / US 20 west – Douglas, Casper	
Niobrara	Manville	39.82	64.08	9th Ave east – US 18 / US 20; 9th Ave west – US 18 / US 20	Former routing of Wyoming Highway 274 and previous routing of US 18 / US 20
Niobrara	Lance Creek	57.97	93.29	WYO 271 west (Twentymile Rd) – West Lance Creek	T intersection; eastern end of WYO 271
Niobrara	Lance Creek	60.73	97.74	WYO 272 north (North Lance Creek Rd)	T intersection; southern end of WYO 272
Niobrara		73.37	118.08	US 18 north / US 85 north – Mule Creek Junction, Newcastle US 18 south / US 85 south – Lusk, Lingle	Northern terminus; T intersection
1.000 mi = 1.609 km; 1.000 km = 0.621 mi

== See also ==
- List of state highways in Wyoming
