= Platte County School District =

Platte County School District may refer to:

- Platte County School District Number 1 (Wyoming)
- Platte County School District Number 2 (Wyoming)
- Platte County School District Number 3 (Missouri)
