= Benjamin Watkins Leigh House =

Historic house in Virginia, United States

- U.S. National Register of Historic Places
- Virginia Landmarks Register
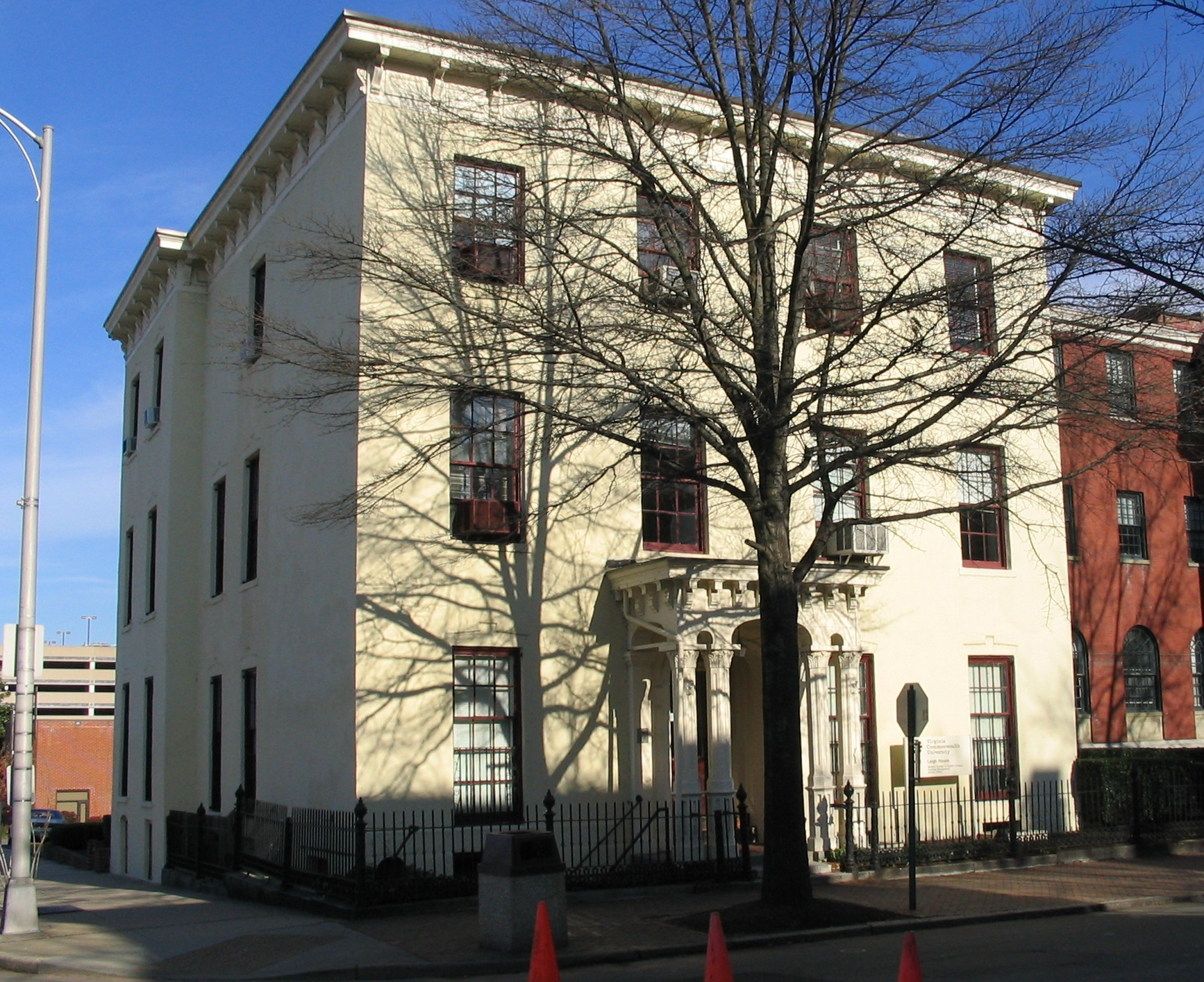
- Benjamin Watkins Leigh House, December 2004

- Location within Virginia Location within the United States
- Location: 1000 E. Clay St., Richmond, Virginia
- Coordinates: 37°32′31″N 77°25′52″W
- Area: 0.8 acres (0.32 ha)
- Built: 1812-1816
- Built by: Wickham, John
- Architectural style: Federal, Italianate
- NRHP reference No.: 69000352
- VLR No.: 127-0065

Significant dates
- Added to NRHP: April 16, 1969
- Designated VLR: November 5, 1968

Benjamin Watkins Leigh House, also known as the Wickham-Leigh House, is a historic home located in Richmond, Virginia. It was built between 1812 and 1816, and is a three-story, four-bay-by-three-bay dwelling showcasing Federal architecture with rectangular stuccoed brick. It features an Italianate bracketed cornice and a small Italianate front porch. It was the home of Senator Benjamin W. Leigh (1781-1849) and sold to Lieutenant Governor John Munford Gregory (1804-84) upon Leigh's death in 1849. The house was sold to Sheltering Arms Hospital in 1932, after which a large three-story wing was added to the east side connecting it to the William H. Grant House. The house was later sold to the Medical College of Virginia and used for offices.

It was listed on the National Register of Historic Places in 1969.
