= Wyoming Highway 318 =

State highway in Platte County, Wyoming, United States

Wyoming Highway 318
- WYO 318 highlighted in red

Route information
- Maintained by WYDOT
- Length: 1.09 mi (1.75 km)

Major junctions
- West end: WYO 270 in Hartville
- East end: Dead End in Sunrise

Location
- Country: United States
- State: Wyoming
- Counties: Platte

Highway system
- Wyoming State Highway System; Interstate; US; State
← WYO 317	→ WYO 319

Wyoming Highway 318 (WYO 318) is a 1.09-mile (1.75 km) east–west state highway in northeastern Platte County, Wyoming, United States, that connects Wyoming Highway 270 (WYO 270) in Hartville with Sunrise.

== Route description ==
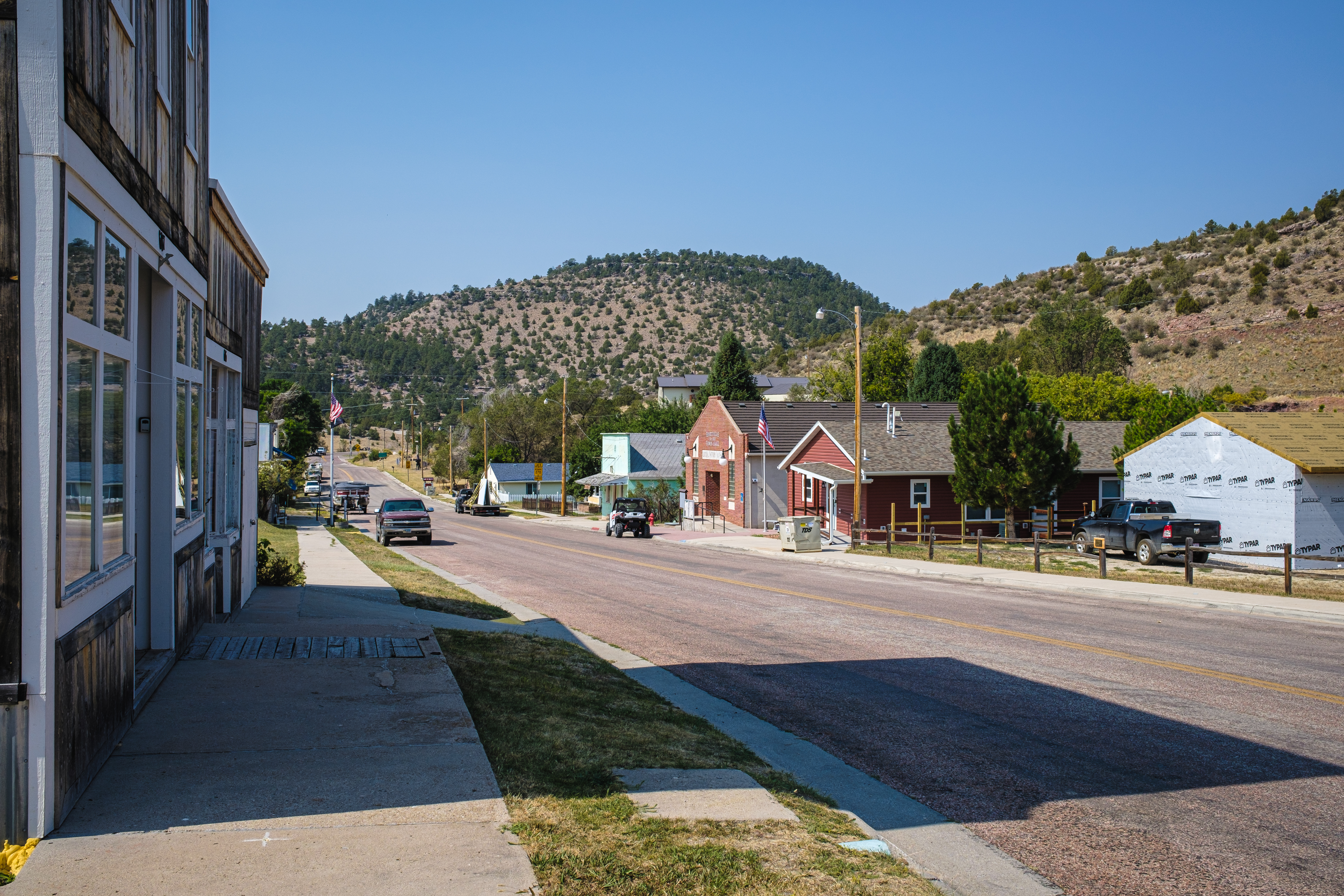
West along WYO 318 in Hartville, September 2020

WYO 318 begins at WYO 270 in the small town of Hartville. WYO 318 travels east as Hartville's Main Street for a mile till it reaches the old mining town of Sunrise at 1.09 miles (1.75 km). Upon reaching the former town, WYO 318 ends at a road closed sign as the mine property is gated. The Sunrise Mine operated until 1980 and produced 42,457,187 tons of iron ore

== History ==
The section of present-day Wyo 270 from U.S. Route 26 (US 26), east of Guernsey, north to Hartville at present-day WYO 318 was formerly designated as Wyoming Highway 318 prior to the 1970s. WYO 318 used to begin as US 26 at Guernsey and end at Sunrise with a 90 degree turn at Hartville. The stretch between Guernsey and Hartville was recommissioned as Wyoming Highway 270 when that road was completed between Manville and Hartville to maintain continuity.

== Major intersections ==
The entire route is in Platte County.

Location	mi	km	Destinations	Notes
Hartville	0.00	0.00	WYO 270 north – Manville WYO 270 south – Guernsey	Western terminus; T intersection
Sunrise	1.09	1.75	Dead End	Eastern terminus
1.000 mi = 1.609 km; 1.000 km = 0.621 mi

== See also ==
- List of state highways in Wyoming
