= Sunrise, Wyoming =

Ghost town and historic district in Platte County, Wyoming, United States

- Sunrise Mine Historic District
- U.S. National Register of Historic Places
- U.S. Historic district
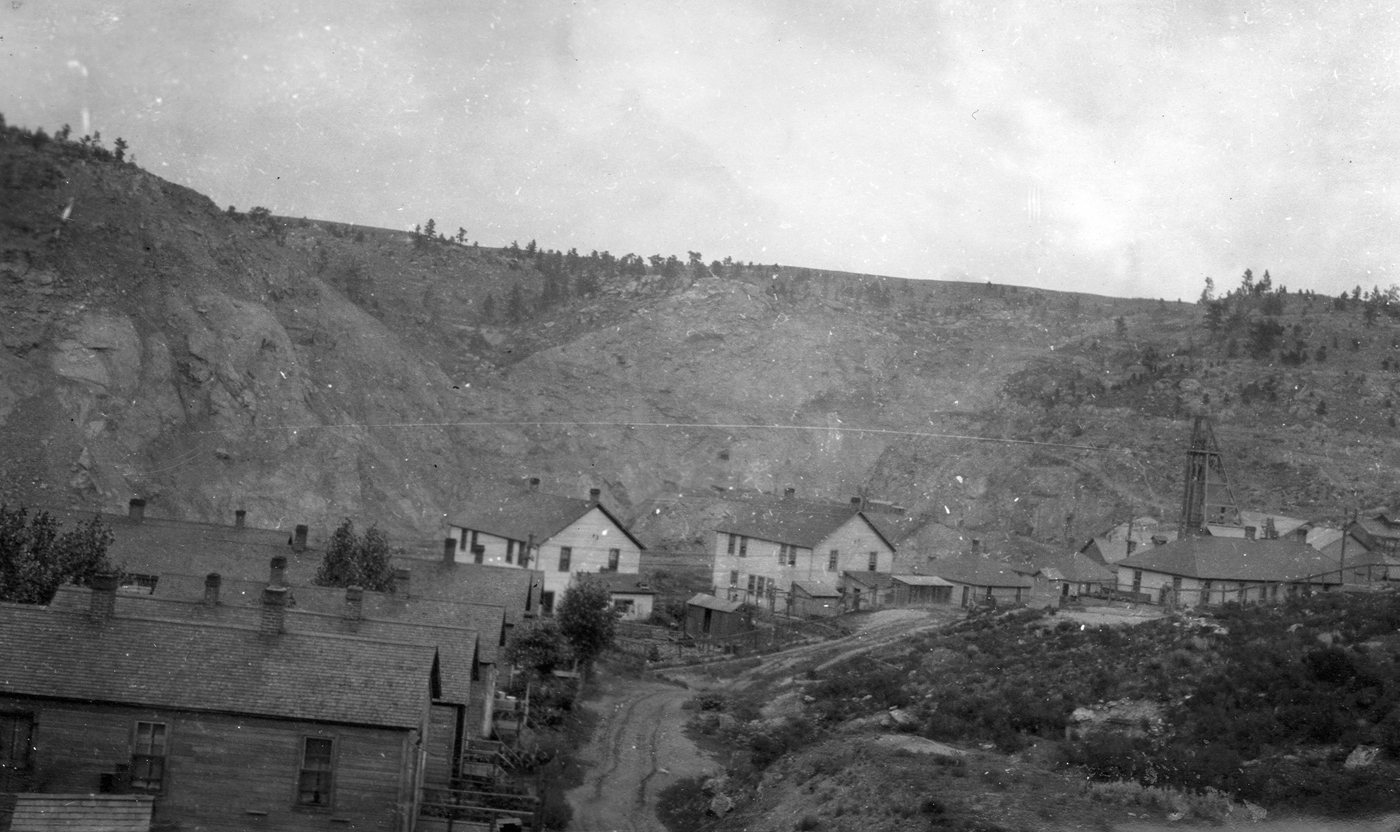
- Sunrise, Wyoming in 1926

- Location within Wyoming Location within the United States
- Location: Wyoming Highway 318, Platte County, Wyoming
- Coordinates: 42°19′55″N 104°42′11″W
- Built: 1898
- NRHP reference No.: 05000925
- Added to NRHP: December 23, 2005

Sunrise was a company mining town of the Colorado Fuel and Iron Company located in Platte County, Wyoming, United States. The entire site of the former mining district and town is listed on the National Register of Historic Places (NRHP).

== History ==
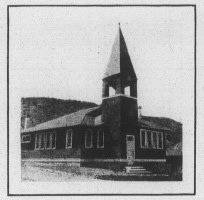
Church built for miners in Sunrise by CF&I at cost of $3,400.

In the 1880s the area around what would become Sunrise was an important area in the mining of copper. In 1890, Charles A. Guernsey, after whom the nearby town of Guernsey, Wyoming is named, founded the Wyoming Railway and Iron Company to exploit iron mining in the area. In 1898, the Colorado Fuel and Iron company began leasing mining rights in the area to improve its supply of iron. In 1904 Colorado Fuel and Iron bought the entire Sunrise Mine.

Colorado Fuel and Iron hoped to make Sunrise a model company town. In the early 1900s company-owned houses, boarding houses, depots, a school, churches, shops, and other structures were built. In response to the Ludlow Massacre, further improvements came to the town in the 1910s and 1920s in the form of better brick housing, a YMCA building, parks, a playground, better utility systems, a hospital, and other improvements. By 1928 the mine employed 547.

Initially, the mining methods used at Sunrise were strip mining followed by glory-hole mining. In 1930, underground block caving mining was started, and by World War II all mining was underground. Ore mined was partially processed on site and then sent to Colorado Fuel and Iron mills in Pueblo, Colorado.

Because of decreasing ore quality and problems in the domestic steel market, the town and mine were closed by Colorado Fuel and Iron in 1980. Over the lifetime of the mine 40 million tons of iron ore were produced, more than any other C.F. & I. mine. The district was added to the National Register of Historic Places in 2005.

== Highways ==
- WYO 318 - runs west from Sunrise one mile to Hartville, where it meets WYO 270, which connects to U.S. Route 26, five miles (8.0 km) to the south.

== See also ==
- List of ghost towns in Wyoming
- National Register of Historic Places listings in Platte County, Wyoming
