= William H. Grant House =

William H. Grant House may refer to:

- William H. Grant House (Middleport, Ohio)
- William H. Grant House (Richmond, Virginia)

== See also ==
- Grant House (disambiguation)
