= Wyoming Highway 317 =

State highway in Platte County, Wyoming, United States

Wyoming Highway 317
- Lakeside Drive
- WYO 317 highlighted in red

Route information
- Maintained by WYDOT
- Length: 1.66 mi (2.67 km)

Major junctions
- South end: US 26 west of Guernsey
- North end: Lakeside Drive in Guernsey State Park

Location
- Country: United States
- State: Wyoming
- Counties: Platte

Highway system
- Wyoming State Highway System; Interstate; US; State
← WYO 316	→ WYO 318

Wyoming Highway 317 (WYO 317) is a 1.66-mile (2.67 km) north–south state highway in northeastern Platte County, Wyoming, United States that connect U.S. Route 26 (US 26), west of Guernsey with Guernsey State Park and serves as the park's south entrance.

== Route description ==
WYO 317 begins at US 26 just west of Guernsey. It proceeds northward to Guernsey State Park, where it ends at 1.66 miles.

The roadway continues as Lakeside Drive and crosses the Guernsey Dam, an earth-fill dam on the North Platte River. Lakeside Drive then runs along the eastern side of the Guernsey Reservoir to the north park entrance and then out to Wyoming Highway 270 northeast of the park.

== Major intersections ==
The entire route is in Platte County.

Location	mi	km	Destinations	Notes
	0.00	0.00	US 26 east (Heartland Expy) – Guernsey, Fort Laramie, Torrington US 26 west (Heartland Expy) – Wheatland, Douglas	Southern terminus; T intersection
Guernsey State Park	1.66	2.67	Hydro Cir east	Northern terminus; T intersection
Guernsey State Park	1.66	2.67	Lakeside Drive north – WYO 270	Continuation north beyond northern terminus
1.000 mi = 1.609 km; 1.000 km = 0.621 mi

== See also ==
- List of state highways in Wyoming
