= Miners and Stockmen's Steakhouse & Spirits =

Coordinates: 42°19′40″N 104°43′33″W

Restaurant information
- Established: 1862
- Location: Wyoming, United States

Miners and Stockmen's Steakhouse & Spirits is a restaurant located in the sparsely populated town of Hartville in the U.S. state of Wyoming. It was opened in 1862 and is the oldest business in the state. It is also one of the last remnants of the Old Fort Laramie Trading Post.

== History ==
Miners and Stockmen's Steakhouse & Spirits was opened in 1862. The bar back that is still used nowadays was hand carved by brewmasters in Germany. The restaurant is situated in a former booming mining town, and it was a popular spot for bank robbers, cattle rustlers and other outlaws. People would gather secretly in its basement to drink during the Prohibition.

Scott and Christine Harmon bought Miners and Stockmen’s Steakhouse & Spirits in 2014.

== Features ==
Miners and Stockmen's Steakhouse and Spirits has a wild west ambience. It is illustrated by its brick-and-wood facade, iron front sign and rustic decor. Local taxidermy adorns the walls. The restaurant has a large outdoor patio for dining which also has a view of the Wyoming hills.

Miners and Stockmen's Steakhouse and Spirits offers a selection of steaks and vodka. The bar has an extensive wine list and offers 35 different kinds of whiskeys.
