= Niobrara County School District Number 1 =

School district in Wyoming, United States

Niobrara County School District #1 is a public school district based in Lusk, Wyoming, United States.

== Geography ==
Niobrara County School District #1 serves all of Niobrara County and a small portion of northwestern Goshen County. The following communities are served by the district:

- Incorporated places
  - Town of Lusk
  - Town of Manville
  - Town of Van Tassell
- Census-designated places (Note: All census-designated places are unincorporated.)
  - Lance Creek

== Schools ==
- Niobrara County High School (Grades 9–12)
- Lusk Elementary & Middle School (Grades K-8)
- Lance Creek School (Grades K-3)

== Student demographics ==
The following figures are as of October 1, 2020.

- Total District Enrollment: 1397
- Student enrollment by gender
  - Male: 673 (48.17%)
  - Female: 724 (51.83%)
- Student enrollment by ethnicity
  - White (not Hispanic): 1111 (79.53%)
  - Hispanic: 228 (16.32%)
  - Asian or Pacific Islander: 14 (1.00%)
  - American Indian or Alaskan Native: 23 (1.65%)
  - Black (not Hispanic): 10 (0.72%)

== See also ==
- List of school districts in Wyoming
