= Van Tassell, Wyoming =

- Town
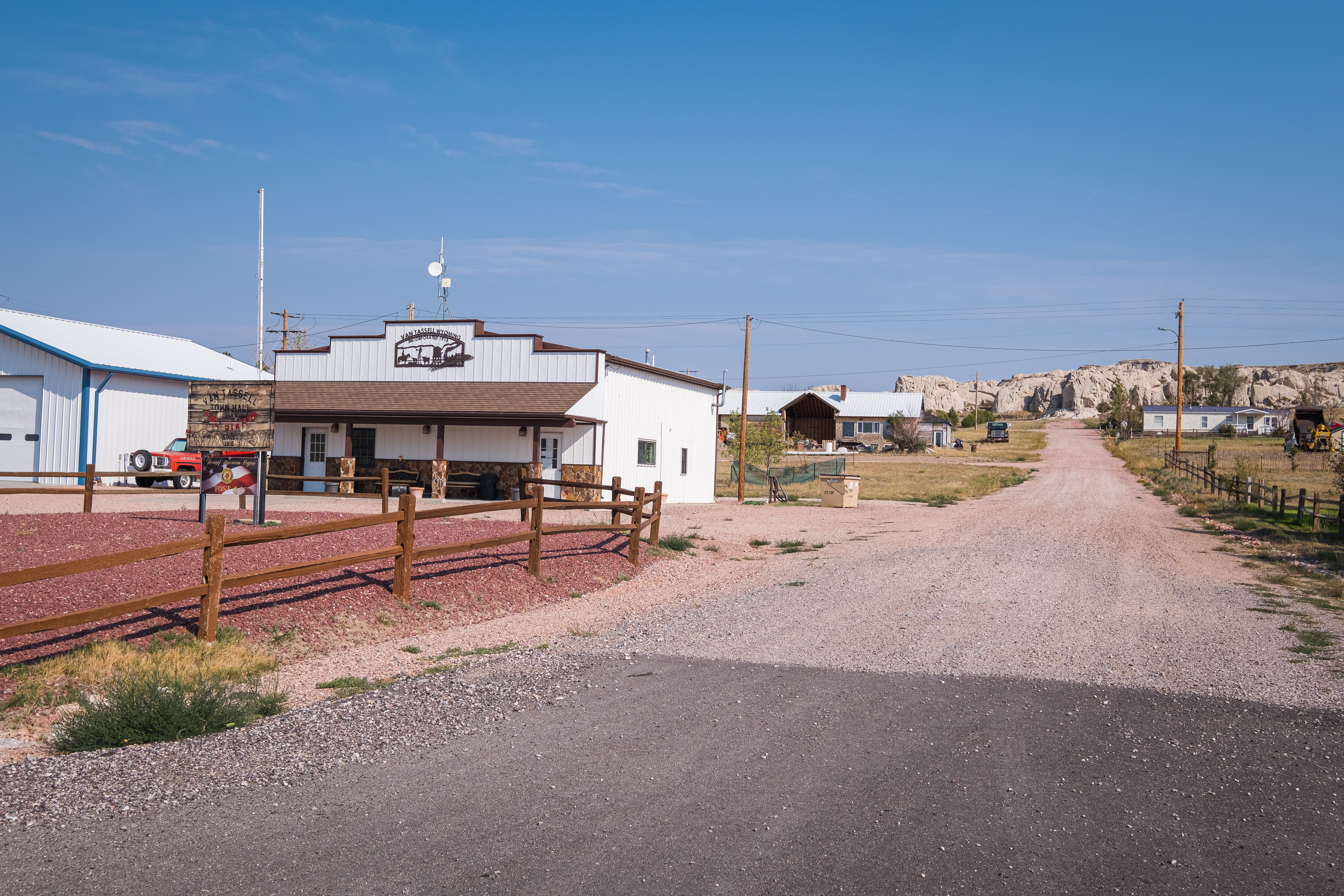
- Van Tassell from Hwy 20

- Location of Van Tassell in Niobrara County, Wyoming.
- Coordinates: 42°39′51″N 104°05′29″W
- Country: United States
- State: Wyoming
- County: Niobrara

Area
  - Total: 1.83 sq mi (4.73 km^{2})
  - Land: 1.83 sq mi (4.73 km^{2})
  - Water: 0 sq mi (0.00 km^{2})
- Elevation: 4,741 ft (1,445 m)

Population (2020)
  - Total: 22
  - Density: 9.8/sq mi (3.8/km^{2})
- Time zone: UTC-7 (Mountain (MST))
  - Summer (DST): UTC-6 (MDT)
- ZIP code: 82242
- Area code: 307
- FIPS code: 56-79705
- GNIS feature ID: 2413423

Van Tassell is a town in Niobrara County, Wyoming, United States. As of the 2020 census, Van Tassell had a population of 22.

== History ==
A post office was established at Van Tassell in 1910 and was in operation until its discontinuation in 2017. The town was named for R. S. Van Tassell, a cattleman.

== Geography ==
According to the United States Census Bureau, the town has a total area of 1.83 square miles (4.74 km^{2}), all land.

== Demographics ==
Historical population
Census	Pop.	Note	%±
1920	170		—
1930	90		−47.1%
1940	82		−8.9%
1950	34		−58.5%
1960	15		−55.9%
1970	21		40.0%
1980	10		−52.4%
1990	8		−20.0%
2000	18		125.0%
2010	15		−16.7%
2020	22		46.7%
U.S. Decennial Census

=== 2010 census ===
As of the census of 2010, there were 15 people, 6 households, and 6 families residing in the town. The population density was 8.2 inhabitants per square mile (3.2/km^{2}). There were 9 housing units at an average density of 4.9 per square mile (1.9/km^{2}). The racial makeup of the town was 100.0% White.

There were 6 households, of which 2 had children under the age of 18 living with them, 5 were married couples living together, and 2 had a female householder with no husband present. No households were made up of single individuals. The average household size was 2.50 and the average family size was 2.50.

The median age in the town was 52.5 years. 4 residents were under the age of 18; 0 were between the ages of 18 and 24; 2 were from 25 to 44; 5 were from 45 to 64; and 4 were 65 years of age or older. The gender makeup of the town was 6 males and 9 females.

=== 2000 census ===
As of the census of 2000, there were 18 people, 9 households, and 5 families residing in the town. The population density was 9.9 people per square mile (3.8/km^{2}). There were 11 housing units at an average density of 6.0 per square mile (2.3/km^{2}). The racial makeup of the town was 94.44% White and 5.56% Asian.

There were 9 households, out of which 33.3% had children under the age of 18 living with them, 55.6% were married couples living together, and 44.4% were non-families. 33.3% of all households were made up of individuals, and 22.2% had someone living alone who was 65 years of age or older. The average household size was 2.00 and the average family size was 2.60.

In the town, the population was spread out, with 16.7% under the age of 18, 22.2% from 25 to 44, 27.8% from 45 to 64, and 33.3% who were 65 years of age or older. The median age was 50 years. For every 100 females, there were 63.6 males. For every 100 females age 18 and over, there were 66.7 males.

The median income for a household in the town was $53,750, and the median income for a family was $53,750. Males had a median income of $40,000 versus $15,000 for females. The per capita income for the town was $17,686. None of the population or the families were below the poverty line.

== Education ==
Public education in the town of Van Tassell is provided by Niobrara County School District #1. Schools serving the town include Lusk Elementary/Middle School (grades K–8) and Niobrara County High School (grades 9–12).

== Highways ==
- U.S. Route 20 - east–west route through Van Tassell.
- WYO 159 (Van Tassell Rd.) - South Van Tassell Rd. becomes Wyoming State Route 159 to Torrington.

== Notable residents ==
- Warren Leroy Jones, Judge of the United States Court of Appeals for the Fifth Circuit, lived in Van Tassell.
