= Keeline, Wyoming =

Unincorporated community in Niobrara County, Wyoming

- Unincorporated community
- Location within the state of Wyoming Keeline (the United States)
- Coordinates: 42°45′25″N 104°45′24″W
- Country: United States
- State: Wyoming
- County: Niobrara
- Established: 1910
- Elevation: 5,305 ft (1,617 m)
- Time zone: UTC-7 (Mountain (MST))
  - Summer (DST): UTC-6 (MDT)
- GNIS feature ID: 1597370

Keeline is an unincorporated community in Niobrara County, in the U.S. state of Wyoming.

== History ==
A post office called Keeline was established in 1908, and remained in operation until it was discontinued in 1995. The community was named for George A. Keeline, a cattleman. In 1910, the settlement was first planned by Addison Spaugh, who encouraged businesses to settle around the local railway depot. Several establishments soon set up in town, including a barber, lumberyard, dining hall, car dealership, a hardware store, and a school. A newspaper, the Keeline Record, was set up in 1916 and ran until 1923. At its peak, Keeline may have had as many as 440 residents. By 1940, 101 residents remained. Today, only a few people live in the townsite, and most of the buildings are abandoned.
