= Wyoming Highway 272 =

State highway in Wyoming, United States

Wyoming Highway 272
- North Lance Creek Road
- WYO 272 highlighted in red

Route information
- Maintained by WYDOT
- Length: 3.32 mi (5.34 km)

Major junctions
- South end: WYO 270 NE of Lance Creek
- North end: CR 14

Location
- Country: United States
- State: Wyoming
- Counties: Niobrara

Highway system
- Wyoming State Highway System; Interstate; US; State
← WYO 271	→ WYO 273

Wyoming Highway 272 (WYO 272) is a 3.32-mile-long (5.34 km) north–south Wyoming State Road named North Lance Creek Road and is located in north central Niobrara County.

== Route description ==
Wyoming Highway 272 has its southern end at Wyoming Highway 270, northeast of Lance Creek. WYO 272 heads north into the Lance Creek Fossil Area. Highway 272 ends at 3.32 miles and Niobrara County Route 14 takes over as the northern routing.

== Major intersections ==
The entire route is in Niobrara County.

Location	mi	km	Destinations	Notes
Lance Creek	0.00	0.00	WYO 270	
	3.32	5.34	CR 14 (North Lance Creek Rd)	Continuation beyond northern terminus
1.000 mi = 1.609 km; 1.000 km = 0.621 mi
