= Wyoming Highway 273 =

State highway in Wyoming, United States

Wyoming Highway 273
- Country Club Road
- WYO 273 highlighted in red

Route information
- Maintained by WYDOT
- Length: 0.33 mi (530 m)

Major junctions
- South end: US 18 / US 20 near Lusk
- North end: Niobrara County Club near Lusk

Location
- Country: United States
- State: Wyoming
- Counties: Niobrara

Highway system
- Wyoming State Highway System; Interstate; US; State
← WYO 272	→ US 287

Wyoming Highway 273 (WYO 273) is a short 0.33-mile-long (0.53 km) north–south Wyoming State Road, known as County Club Road, located in south-central Niobrara County two miles west of Lusk.

== Route description ==
At only 0.33 miles (0.53 km) in length, Wyoming Highway 273 acts as a spur from US 18/US 20 north to the Lusk Municipal Golf Course, just west of Lusk.

== Major intersections ==
The entire route is in Lusk, Niobrara County.

mi	km	Destinations	Notes
0.00	0.00	US 18 / US 20	Southern terminus of WYO 273
0.33	0.53	Niobrara County Club	Northern terminus of WYO 273
1.000 mi = 1.609 km; 1.000 km = 0.621 mi
