= Wyoming Highway 271 =

Highway in Wyoming

Wyoming Highway 271
- Twentymile Road
- WYO 271 highlighted in red

Route information
- Maintained by WYDOT
- Length: 3.19 mi (5.13 km)

Major junctions
- East end: WYO 270 in Lance Creek
- West end: CR 23 in West Lance Creek

Location
- Country: United States
- State: Wyoming
- Counties: Niobrara

Highway system
- Wyoming State Highway System; Interstate; US; State
← WYO 270	→ WYO 272

Wyoming Highway 271 (WYO 271) is a 3.19-mile-long (5.13 km) east–west Wyoming State Road known as Twenty Mile Road and is located in west-central Niobrara County, Wyoming, United States.

== Route description ==
Wyoming Highway 271 travels from Wyoming Highway 270 at Lance Creek west 3.19 miles to West Lance Creek where it ends and Niobrara CR 23 takes over. Milepost zero is at its eastern junction with Wyoming Highway 270. WYO 271 also provides access to the local airport.

== Major intersections ==
The entire route is in Niobrara County.

Location	mi	km	Destinations	Notes
Lance Creek	0.00	0.00	WYO 270	Eastern terminus of WYO 271
West Lance Creek	3.19	5.13	CR 23 (Twenty Mile Road)	Western terminus of WYO 271
1.000 mi = 1.609 km; 1.000 km = 0.621 mi
