= Sheltering Arms Physical Rehabilitation Centers =

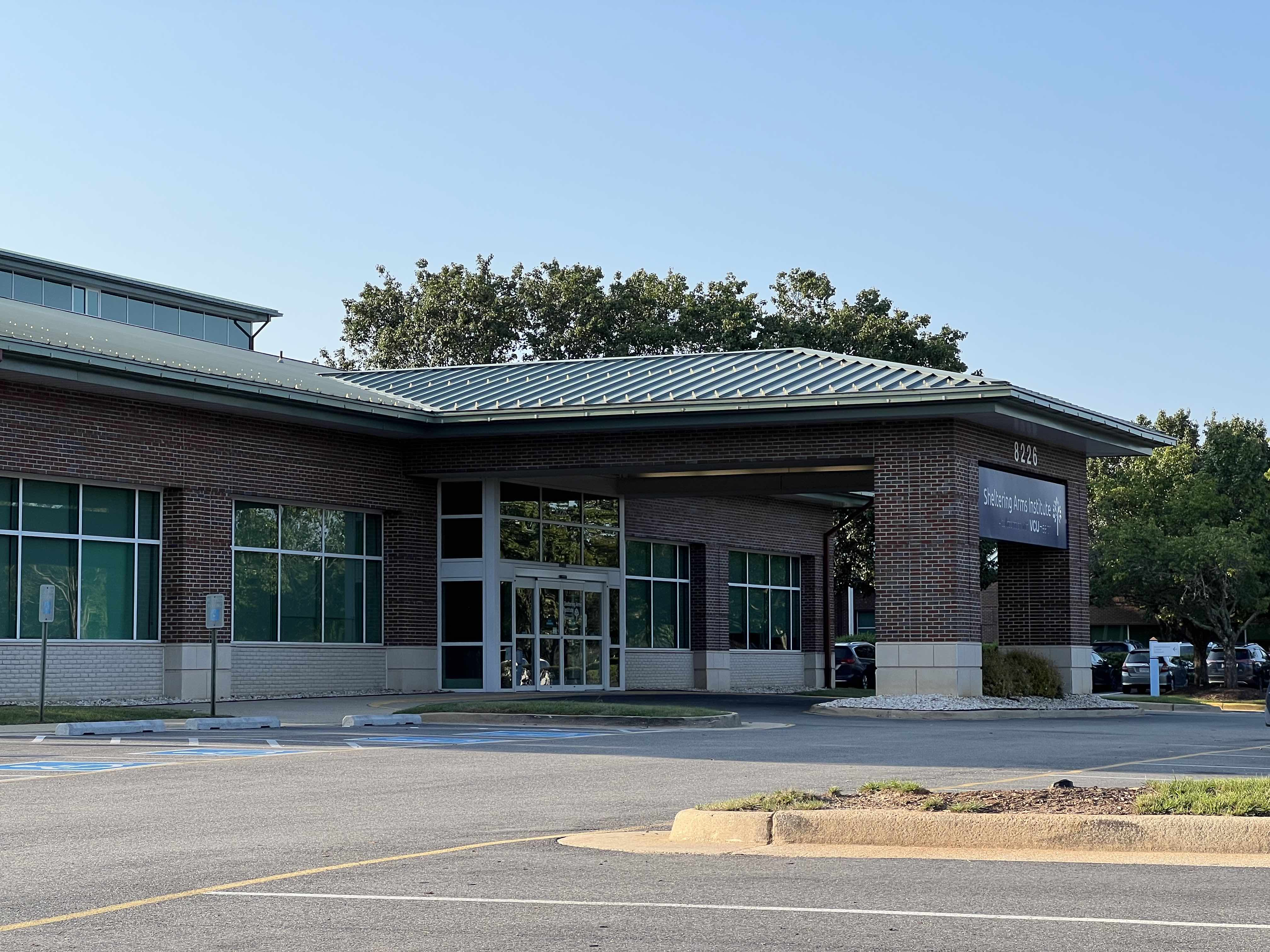
- Sheltering Arms Institute in Mechanicsville, where the hospital used to be located.

Geography
- Location: Richmond, Virginia, United States
- Coordinates: 37°37′43″N 77°23′14.6″W

Organization
- Type: Specialist

Services
- Speciality: Rehabilitation and health services

History
- Opened: 1889

Links
- Website: www.shelteringarms.com
- Lists: Hospitals in Virginia

Sheltering Arms Physical Rehabilitation Centers (previously Sheltering Arms Hospital) are rehabilitation and health services facilities in the Greater Richmond Region of Virginia. The original hospital was founded in 1889 in Richmond, Virginia with mission to rendering medical services to all, regardless of their ability to pay. From 1892 to 1965, the hospital was housed in the William H. Grant House.

Sheltering Arms Physical Rehabilitation Hospital provides services from multiple in-patient locations. It also offers case management services to help patients and their families address short- and long-term rehabilitation issues and access community-based resources. Sheltering Arms Physical Rehabilitation Hospital is accredited by the Joint Commission on Accreditation of Healthcare Organizations (JCAHO).
