= Peter Grant House =

Historic house in Maine, United States

- U.S. National Register of Historic Places
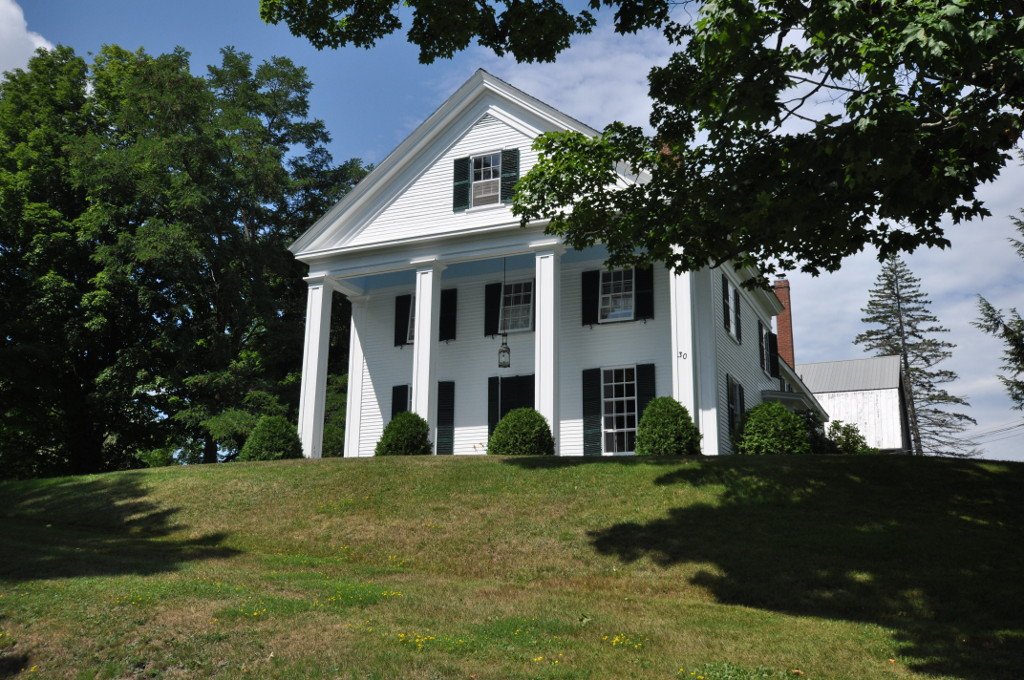

- Location within Maine Location within the United States
- Location: 10 Grant Street, Farmingdale, Maine
- Coordinates: 44°14′29″N 69°46′27″W
- Area: 1 acre (0.40 ha)
- Built: 1830
- Architectural style: Greek Revival
- NRHP reference No.: 76000096
- Added to NRHP: May 17, 1976

The Peter Grant House is a historic house at 10 Grant Street in Farmingdale, Maine. Built in 1830, it is one Maine's oldest surviving examples of Greek Revival architecture, with a temple front overlooking the Kennebec River. It was listed on the National Register of Historic Places on May 17, 1976.

== Description and history ==
The house sits just south of the modest village center of Farmingdale, on the south side of Grant Street, and residential spur extending west from Maine State Route 27, which parallels the west bank of the Kennebec River.

It is a 2 1/2-story wood-frame structure, with a gabled roof, clapboard siding, and granite foundation. The east-facing gable front is fully pedimented, extending beyond the main block to form a Greek temple portico with four two-story paneled square columns. There are paneled pilasters at the corners of this facade, which is three bays wide, with elongated sash windows flanking the entrance on the ground floor, and smaller sashes above. A small sash window fills the gable of the portico.

Peter Grant was a native of Berwick, Maine who moved to Gardiner in 1790. Finding financial success in land speculation and the merchant trade, he purchased 200 acres (81 ha) between Gardiner and Hallowell in 1800, and built a house there. His first house was destroyed by fire, and he had this house built in 1830 as its replacement. The house remained in the hands of the Grant family until 1865, and was owned by members of the Skehan family for a significant portion of the 20th century.

== See also ==
- National Register of Historic Places listings in Kennebec County, Maine
