= Patten Creek Site =

- U.S. National Register of Historic Places
- NRHP reference No.: 89001204
- Added to NRHP: September 11, 1989

The Patten Creek Site is prehistoric stone tool fabrication site in Platte County, Wyoming. The location was used mostly during the Pains Archaic period and has been shown by archeological investigation to represent about 3.6 metres (12 ft) of deposits. Primary investigation was undertaken at the site in the 1960s.

The site was placed on the National Register of Historic Places on September 11, 1989.
