= Platte County School District Number 2 =

School district in Wyoming, United States

Platte County School District #2 is a public school district based in Guernsey, Wyoming, United States.

== Geography ==
Platte County School District #2 serves northeastern Platte County as well as a very small portion of northwestern Goshen County, including the following communities:

- Incorporated places
  - Town of Guernsey
  - Town of Hartville

== Schools ==
- Guernsey-Sunrise Junior/Senior High School (Grades 7–12)
- Guernsey-Sunrise Elementary School (Grades K-6)

== Student demographics ==
The following figures are as of October 1, 2008.

- Total District Enrollment: 205
- Student enrollment by gender
  - Male: 94 (45.85%)
  - Female: 111 (54.15%)
- Student enrollment by ethnicity
  - White (not Hispanic): 172 (83.90%)
  - Hispanic: 28 (13.66%)
  - Asian or Pacific Islander: 2 (0.98%)
  - American Indian or Alaskan Native: 2 (0.98%)
  - Black (not Hispanic): 1 (0.49%)

== See also ==
- List of school districts in Wyoming
