= Hartville, Wyoming =

Town in Platte County, Wyoming, United States

- Town
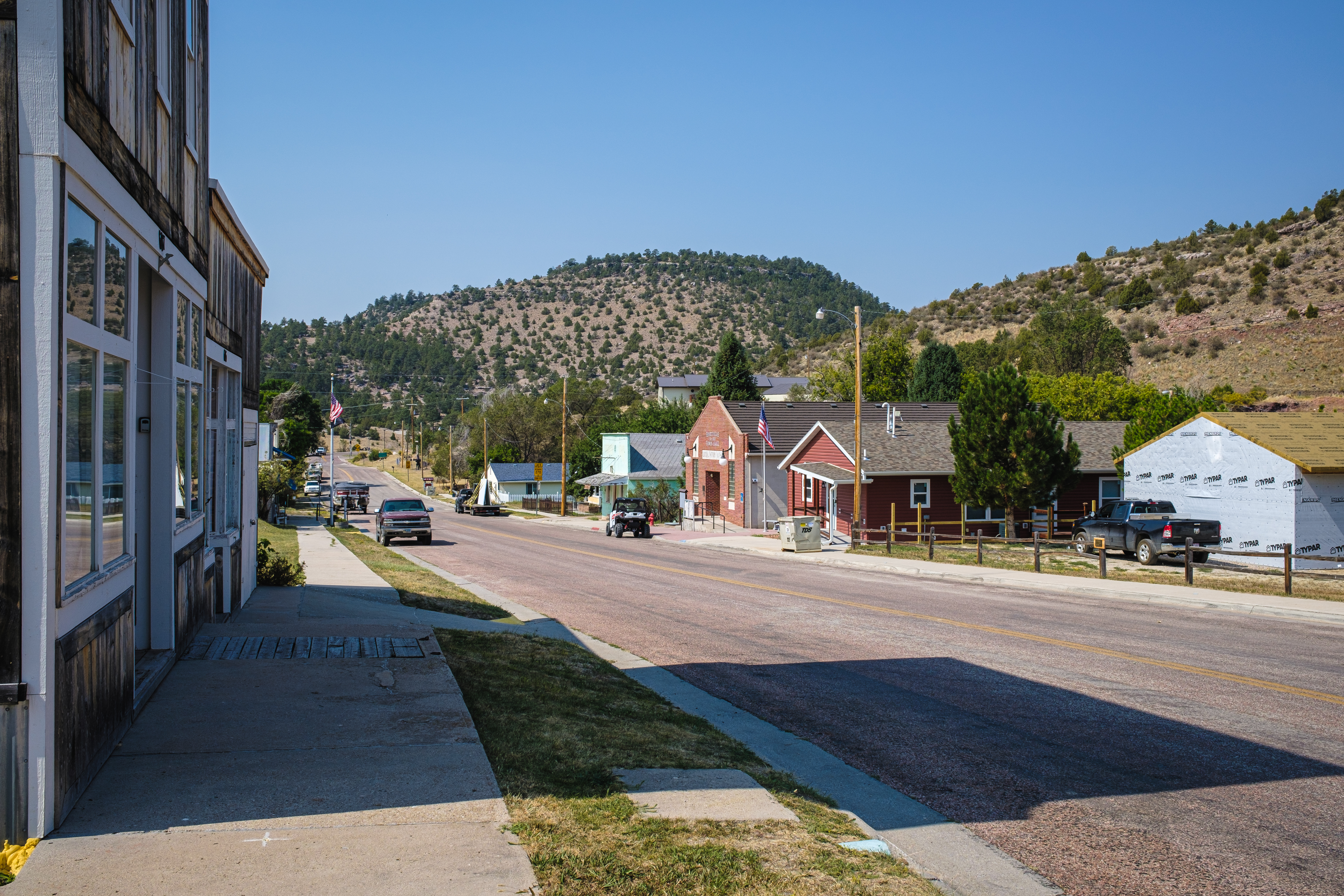
- East on Main Street (WYO 318) in Hartville, September 2020

- Location of Hartville in Platte County, Wyoming.
- Coordinates: 42°19′39″N 104°43′28″W
- Country: United States
- State: Wyoming
- County: Platte

Area
  - Total: 0.26 sq mi (0.67 km^{2})
  - Land: 0.26 sq mi (0.67 km^{2})
  - Water: 0 sq mi (0.00 km^{2})
- Elevation: 4,682 ft (1,427 m)

Population (2020)
  - Total: 64
  - Density: 231.5/sq mi (89.39/km^{2})
- Time zone: UTC-7 (Mountain (MST))
  - Summer (DST): UTC-6 (MDT)
- ZIP code: 82215
- Area code: 307
- FIPS code: 56-35625
- GNIS feature ID: 2412731
- Website: www.hartvillewyoming.com

Hartville is a town in Platte County, Wyoming, United States. As of the 2020 census, Hartville had a population of 64.

== History ==
During the Old West period, Hartville was the scene of multiple shootings. Many of the victims were cowboys and are buried at the town's Boot Hill.

Miners and Stockmen's Steakhouse & Spirits, the oldest business in the state of Wyoming, is located in Hartville. It is also one of the last remnants of the Old Fort Laramie Trading Post.

== Geography ==
Hartville is located at 42°19′36″N 104°43′40″W (42.326783, -104.727790).

According to the United States Census Bureau, the town has a total area of 0.25 square miles (0.65 km^{2}), all land.

== Demographics ==
Historical population
| Census | Pop. | Note | %± |
|---|---|---|---|
| 1910 | 235 | | — |
| 1920 | 138 | | −41.3% |
| 1930 | 189 | | 37.0% |
| 1940 | 179 | | −5.3% |
| 1950 | 229 | | 27.9% |
| 1960 | 177 | | −22.7% |
| 1970 | 246 | | 39.0% |
| 1980 | 149 | | −39.4% |
| 1990 | 78 | | −47.7% |
| 2000 | 76 | | −2.6% |
| 2010 | 62 | | −18.4% |
| 2020 | 64 | | 3.2% |
U.S. Decennial Census

=== 2010 census ===
As of the census of 2010, there were 62 people, 32 households, and 16 families residing in the town. The population density was 248.0 inhabitants per square mile (95.8/km^{2}). There were 45 housing units at an average density of 180.0 per square mile (69.5/km^{2}). The racial makeup of the town was 100.0% White. Hispanic or Latino of any race were 6.5% of the population.

There were 32 households, of which 12.5% had children under the age of 18 living with them, 46.9% were married couples living together, 3.1% had a female householder with no husband present, and 50.0% were non-families. 40.6% of all households were made up of individuals, and 18.8% had someone living alone who was 65 years of age or older. The average household size was 1.94 and the average family size was 2.69.

The median age in the town was 56 years. 12.9% of residents were under the age of 18; 0.0% were between the ages of 18 and 24; 19.3% were from 25 to 44; 38.7% were from 45 to 64; and 29% were 65 years of age or older. The gender makeup of the town was 53.2% male and 46.8% female.

=== 2000 census ===
As of the census of 2000, there were 76 people, 35 households, and 22 families residing in the town. The population density was 272.2 people per square mile (104.8/km^{2}). There were 52 housing units at an average density of 186.2 per square mile (71.7/km^{2}). The racial makeup of the town was 89.47% White, 6.58% from other races, and 3.95% from two or more races. Hispanic or Latino of any race were 22.37% of the population.

There were 35 households, out of which 25.7% had children under the age of 18 living with them, 54.3% were married couples living together, 8.6% had a female householder with no husband present, and 37.1% were non-families. 37.1% of all households were made up of individuals, and 14.3% had someone living alone who was 65 years of age or older. The average household size was 2.17 and the average family size was 2.82.

In the town, the population was spread out, with 23.7% under the age of 18, 1.3% from 18 to 24, 22.4% from 25 to 44, 18.4% from 45 to 64, and 34.2% who were 65 years of age or older. The median age was 51 years. For every 100 females, there were 100.0 males. For every 100 females age 18 and over, there were 93.3 males.

The median income for a household in the town was $25,000, and the median income for a family was $13,750. Males had a median income of $26,667 versus $0 for females. The per capita income for the town was $12,116. There were 36.4% of families and 28.4% of the population living below the poverty line, including 35.3% of under eighteens and 20.0% of those over 64.

== Education ==
Public education in the town of Hartville is provided by Platte County School District #2. Campuses serving the town include Guernsey-Sunrise Elementary School (grades K-6) and Guernsey-Sunrise Junior/Senior High School (grades 7-12).

== Highways ==
- WYO 270 (Hartville Hwy.) - north-south route through Hartville, connects to U.S. Hwy 26 five miles south of Hartville.
- WYO 318 (Sunrise Rd.) - runs east from Hartville to Sunrise.

== See also ==
- List of municipalities in Wyoming
