= Niobrara County, Wyoming =

County in the United States

- County
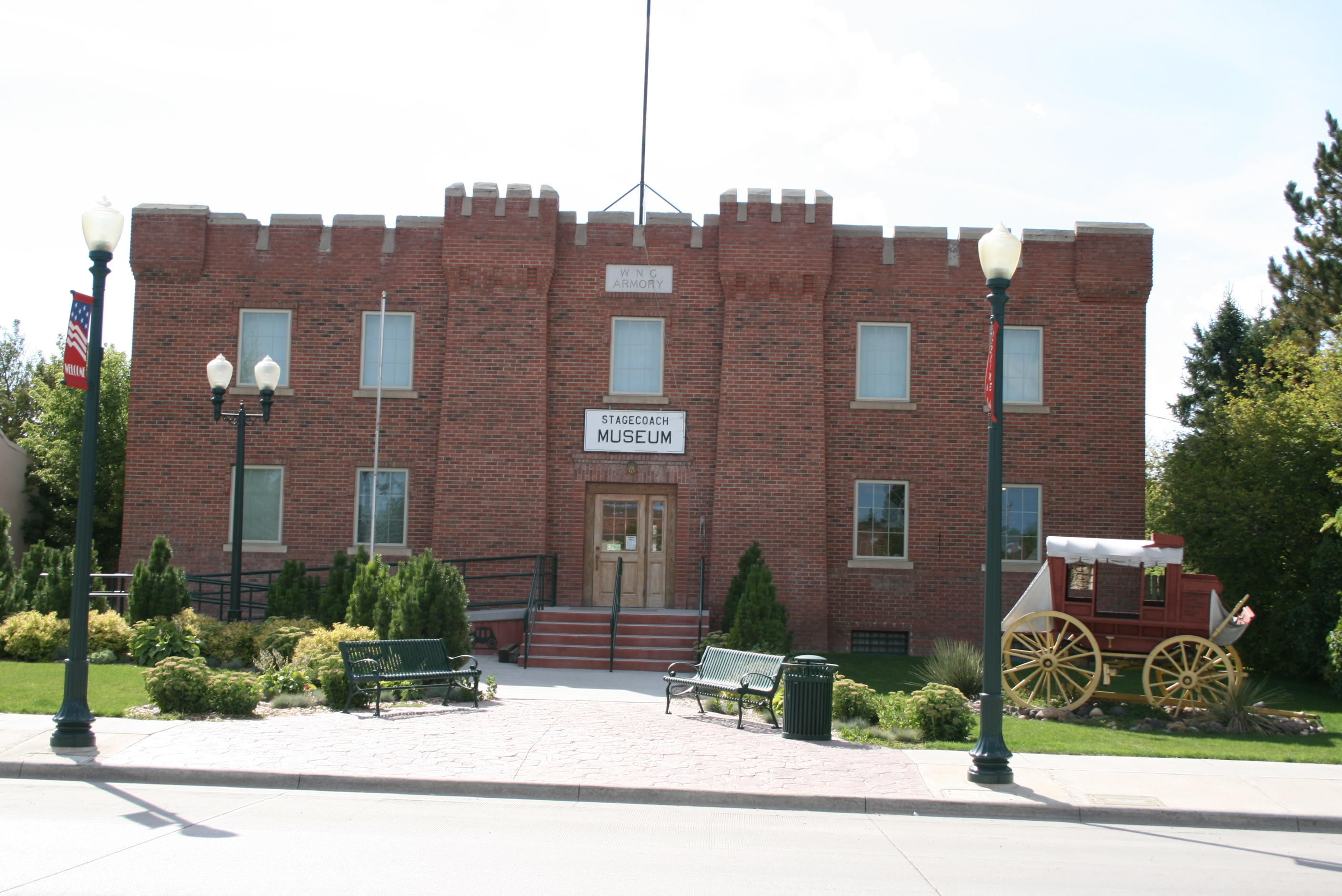
- Stagecoach Museum in Lusk

- Location within the U.S. state of Wyoming
- Coordinates: 43°03′N 104°28′W
- Country: United States
- State: Wyoming
- Founded: February 21, 1911 (authorized); 1913 (organized)
- Named for: Niobrara River
- Seat: Lusk
- Largest town: Lusk

Area
  - Total: 2,628 sq mi (6,810 km^{2})
  - Land: 2,626 sq mi (6,800 km^{2})
  - Water: 1.9 sq mi (4.9 km^{2}) 0.07%

Population (2020)
  - Total: 2,467
  - Estimate (2025): 2,341 ▼
  - Density: 0.9395/sq mi (0.3627/km^{2})
- Time zone: UTC−7 (Mountain)
  - Summer (DST): UTC−6 (MDT)
- Congressional district: At-large
- Website: niobraracounty.org

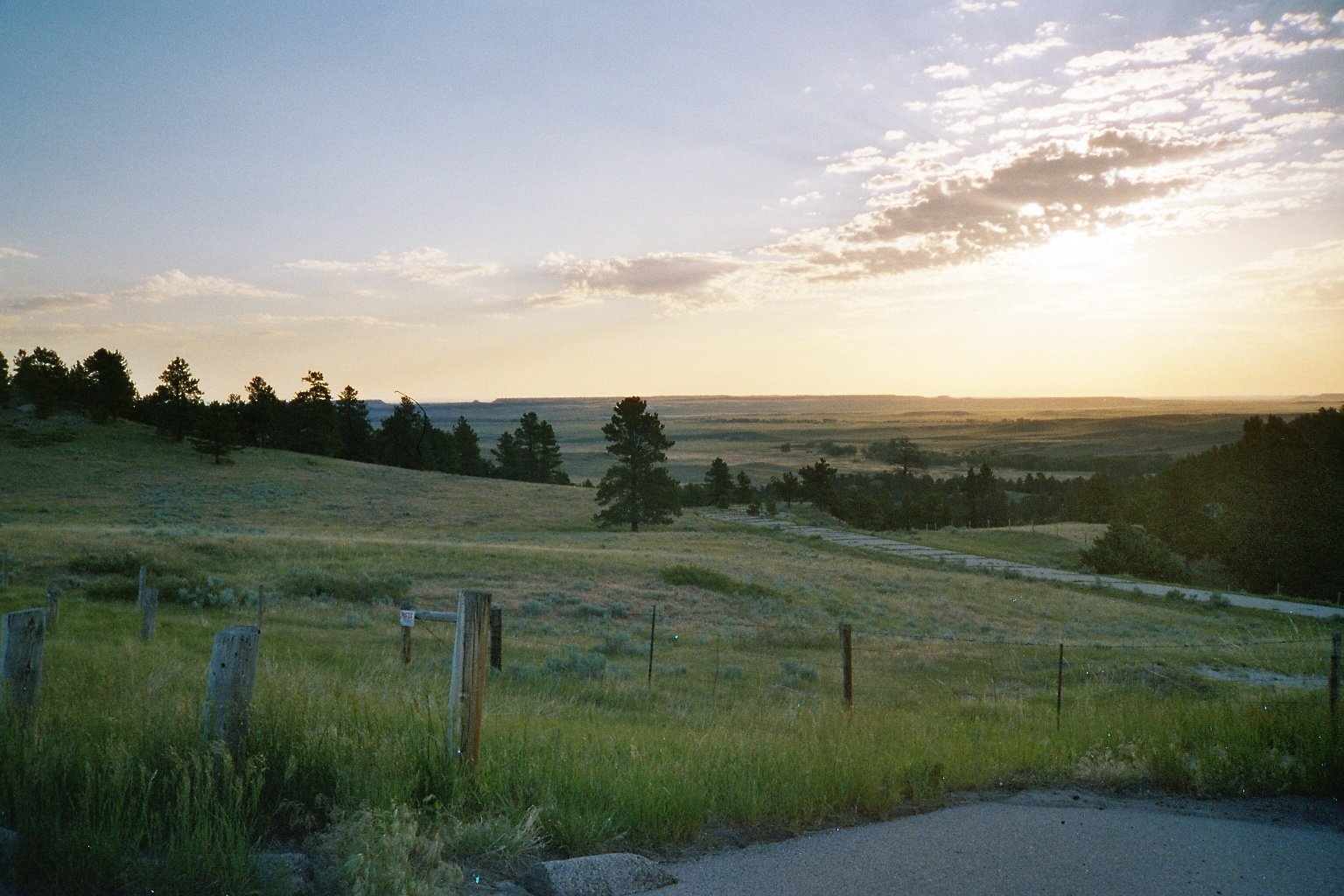
Niobrara County (WY) SR85

Niobrara County is a county in the U.S. state of Wyoming. As of the 2020 United States census, the population was 2,467, making it the least populous county in Wyoming. Its county seat is Lusk. Its eastern boundary abuts the west lines of the states of Nebraska and South Dakota.

== History ==
Niobrara County was created on February 21, 1911, of area annexed from Converse County. Its organization was established in 1913.

The county was named for the Niobrara River, which rises near Lusk.

== Geography ==
According to the US Census Bureau, the county has a total area of 2,628 square miles (6,810 km^{2}), of which 2,626 square miles (6,800 km^{2}) is land and 1.9 square miles (4.9 km^{2}) (0.07%) is water.

In comparison to the state of Rhode Island, the county has more than twice the land area, with approximately 1/500 of the population.

=== Adjacent counties ===
- Weston County – north
- Custer County, South Dakota – northeast
- Fall River County, South Dakota – east
- Sioux County, Nebraska – southeast
- Goshen County – south
- Platte County – southwest
- Converse County – west

=== Major highways ===
- US 18
- US 20
- US 85
- WYO 270
- WYO 271
- WYO 272
- WYO 273

=== National protected area ===
- Thunder Basin National Grassland (part)

== Demographics ==
Historical population
| Census | Pop. | Note | %± |
|---|---|---|---|
| 1920 | 6,321 | | — |
| 1930 | 4,723 | | −25.3% |
| 1940 | 5,988 | | 26.8% |
| 1950 | 4,701 | | −21.5% |
| 1960 | 3,750 | | −20.2% |
| 1970 | 2,924 | | −22.0% |
| 1980 | 2,924 | | 0.0% |
| 1990 | 2,499 | | −14.5% |
| 2000 | 2,407 | | −3.7% |
| 2010 | 2,484 | | 3.2% |
| 2020 | 2,467 | | −0.7% |
| 2025 (est.) | 2,341 | ▼ | −5.1% |
US Decennial Census; 1870–2000 2010–2016

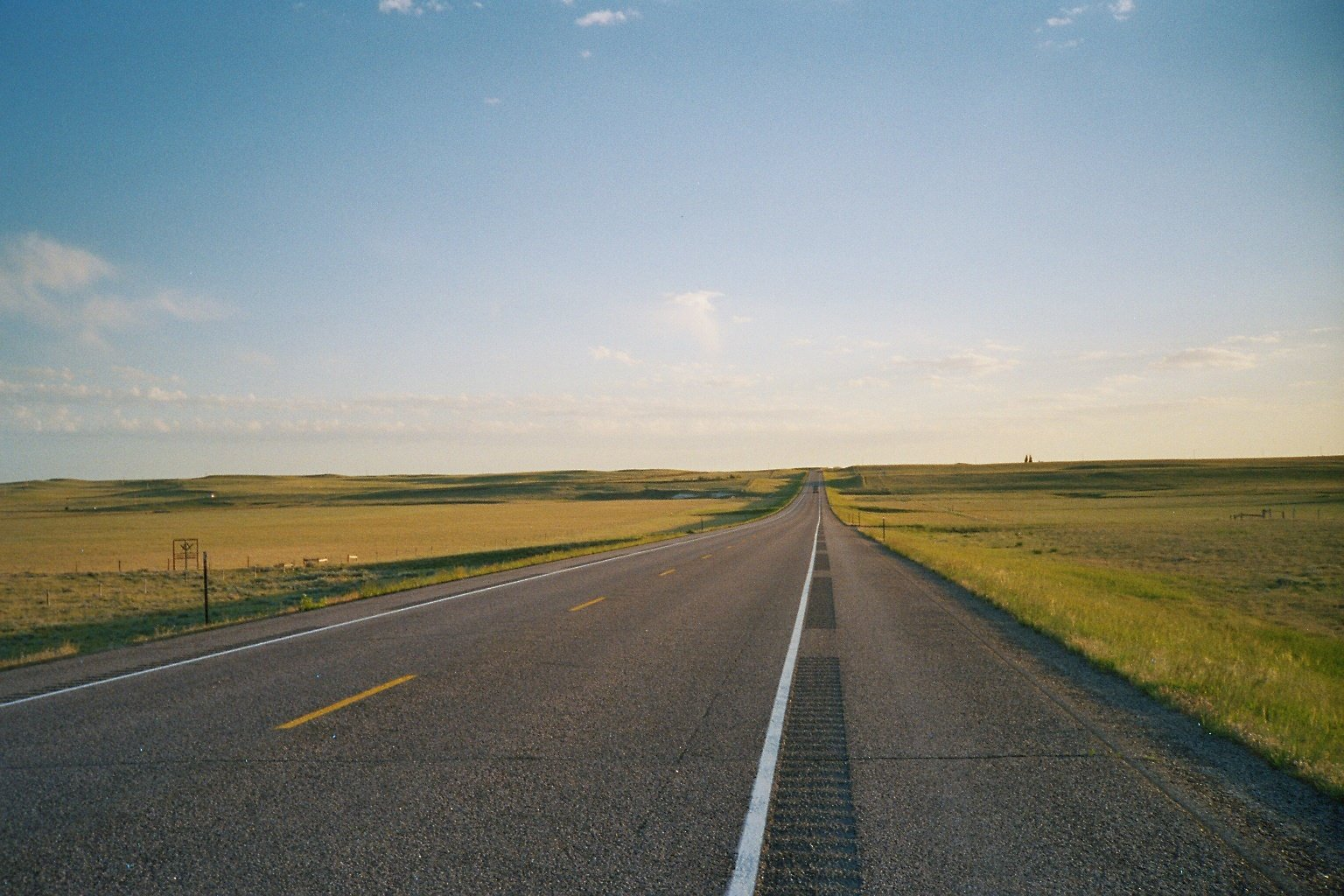
Niobrara County (WY) US85N

=== 2020 census ===
As of the 2020 census, the county had a population of 2,467. Of the residents, 17.6% were under the age of 18 and 25.5% were 65 years of age or older; the median age was 45.5 years. For every 100 females there were 84.4 males, and for every 100 females age 18 and over there were 79.1 males.

Niobrara County, Wyoming – Racial and ethnic composition Note: the US Census treats Hispanic/Latino as an ethnic category. This table excludes Latinos from the racial categories and assigns them to a separate category. Hispanics/Latinos may be of any race.
| Race / Ethnicity (NH = Non-Hispanic) | Pop 2000 | Pop 2010 | Pop 2020 | % 2000 | % 2010 | % 2020 |
|---|---|---|---|---|---|---|
| White alone (NH) | 2,337 | 2,361 | 2,255 | 97.09% | 95.05% | 91.41% |
| Black or African American alone (NH) | 3 | 4 | 6 | 0.12% | 0.16% | 0.24% |
| Native American or Alaska Native alone (NH) | 11 | 20 | 27 | 0.46% | 0.81% | 1.09% |
| Asian alone (NH) | 2 | 9 | 12 | 0.08% | 0.36% | 0.49% |
| Pacific Islander alone (NH) | 0 | 0 | 5 | 0.00% | 0.00% | 0.20% |
| Other race alone (NH) | 1 | 2 | 0 | 0.04% | 0.08% | 0.00% |
| Mixed race or Multiracial (NH) | 17 | 36 | 86 | 0.71% | 1.45% | 3.49% |
| Hispanic or Latino (any race) | 36 | 52 | 76 | 1.50% | 2.09% | 3.08% |
| Total | 2,407 | 2,484 | 2,467 | 100.00% | 100.00% | 100.00% |

The racial makeup of the county was 92.7% White, 0.2% Black or African American, 1.2% American Indian and Alaska Native, 0.5% Asian, 0.5% from some other race, and 4.5% from two or more races. Hispanic or Latino residents of any race comprised 3.1% of the population.

There were 1,024 households in the county, of which 22.9% had children under the age of 18 living with them and 24.7% had a female householder with no spouse or partner present. About 36.6% of all households were made up of individuals and 17.7% had someone living alone who was 65 years of age or older.

There were 1,322 housing units, of which 22.5% were vacant. Among occupied housing units, 72.9% were owner-occupied and 27.1% were renter-occupied. The homeowner vacancy rate was 2.5% and the rental vacancy rate was 22.2%.

=== 2010 census ===
As of the 2010 United States census, there were 2,484 people, 1,069 households, and 659 families in the county. The population density was 0.9 people per square mile (0.35 people/km^{2}). There were 1,338 housing units at an average density of 0.5 units per square mile (0.19 units/km^{2}). The racial makeup of the county was 96.5% white, 0.8% American Indian, 0.4% Asian, 0.2% black or African American, 0.5% from other races, and 1.6% from two or more races. Those of Hispanic or Latino origin made up 2.1% of the population. In terms of ancestry, 41.5% were German, 19.0% were English, 17.7% were Irish, 6.6% were Swedish, and 3.0% were American.

Of the 1,069 households, 23.2% had children under the age of 18 living with them, 50.4% were married couples living together, 7.4% had a female householder with no husband present, 38.4% were non-families, and 34.5% of all households were made up of individuals. The average household size was 2.12 and the average family size was 2.71. The median age was 46.1 years.

The median income for a household in the county was $45,813 and the median income for a family was $57,153. Males had a median income of $41,898 versus $30,323 for females. The per capita income for the county was $22,885. About 6.3% of families and 11.5% of the population were below the poverty line, including 17.9% of those under age 18 and 13.3% of those age 65 or over.

=== 2000 census ===
As of the 2000 United States census, there were 2,407 people, 1,011 households, and 679 families in the county. The population density was 1 person per square mile (0.39 person/km^{2}). There were 1,338 housing units at an average density of 0.5 units per square mile (0.19 units/km^{2}). The racial makeup of the county was 98.05% White, 0.12% Black or African American, 0.50% Native American, 0.12% Asian, 0.50% from other races, and 0.71% from two or more races. 1.50% of the population were Hispanic or Latino of any race. 35.1% were of German, 18.7% English, 11.2% Irish, and 5.7% American ancestry.

There were 1,011 households, out of which 27.10% had children under the age of 18 living with them, 57.60% were married couples living together, 6.00% had a female householder with no husband present, and 32.80% were non-families. 29.50% of all households were made up of individuals, and 14.10% had someone living alone who was 65 years of age or older. The average household size was 2.28 and the average family size was 2.81.

The county population contained 22.60% under the age of 18, 6.10% from 18 to 24, 26.00% from 25 to 44, 26.60% from 45 to 64, and 18.70% who were 65 years of age or older. The median age was 43 years. For every 100 females there were 95.20 males. For every 100 females age 18 and over, there were 88.80 males.

The median income for a household in the county was $29,701, and the median income for a family was $33,714. Males had a median income of $25,909 versus $17,016 for females. The per capita income for the county was $15,757. About 10.70% of families and 13.40% of the population were below the poverty line, including 15.00% of those under age 18 and 15.60% of those age 65 or over.

== Alleged broadcast signal intrusion ==
In 2006, a series of videos originating from the now defunct video sharing site Google Video claimed to be of a broadcast signal intrusion which allegedly occurred in Niobrara County, commonly known online as The Wyoming Incident. It is said that those who watched it would experience hallucinations and other such ailments due to a frequency that played throughout the broadcast. The videos were later revealed to be part of a larger alternate reality game (ARG) project.

== Communities ==
=== Towns ===
- Lusk (county seat)
- Manville
- Van Tassell

=== Census-designated place ===
- Lance Creek

=== Unincorporated communities ===
- Keeline
- Riverview

== Politics ==
Like almost all of Wyoming, Niobrara County is overwhelmingly Republican. No Democratic presidential candidate has won Niobrara County since Franklin D. Roosevelt beat Alf Landon in 1936 by thirty-eight votes, and none since Lyndon B. Johnson in 1964 has attained 30 percent of the county's vote. In 2024, it was the most Republican county in the most Republican state, backing Donald Trump by a more than 80 percent margin.

United States presidential election results for Niobrara County, Wyoming
| Year | Republican | | Democratic | | Third party(ies) | |
| Year | No. | % | No. | % | No. | % |
|---|---|---|---|---|---|---|
| 1912 | 500 | 49.36% | 282 | 27.84% | 231 | 22.80% |
| 1916 | 533 | 45.63% | 599 | 51.28% | 36 | 3.08% |
| 1920 | 969 | 73.52% | 345 | 26.18% | 4 | 0.30% |
| 1924 | 820 | 48.43% | 202 | 11.93% | 671 | 39.63% |
| 1928 | 1,424 | 74.21% | 469 | 24.44% | 26 | 1.35% |
| 1932 | 908 | 41.56% | 1,237 | 56.61% | 40 | 1.83% |
| 1936 | 1,086 | 48.37% | 1,124 | 50.07% | 35 | 1.56% |
| 1940 | 1,427 | 54.22% | 1,200 | 45.59% | 5 | 0.19% |
| 1944 | 1,312 | 61.37% | 826 | 38.63% | 0 | 0.00% |
| 1948 | 975 | 55.87% | 753 | 43.15% | 17 | 0.97% |
| 1952 | 1,652 | 73.13% | 588 | 26.03% | 19 | 0.84% |
| 1956 | 1,248 | 70.67% | 518 | 29.33% | 0 | 0.00% |
| 1960 | 1,362 | 70.57% | 568 | 29.43% | 0 | 0.00% |
| 1964 | 1,122 | 57.10% | 843 | 42.90% | 0 | 0.00% |
| 1968 | 1,136 | 76.24% | 250 | 16.78% | 104 | 6.98% |
| 1972 | 1,245 | 81.00% | 289 | 18.80% | 3 | 0.20% |
| 1976 | 1,042 | 70.55% | 427 | 28.91% | 8 | 0.54% |
| 1980 | 1,075 | 76.13% | 270 | 19.12% | 67 | 4.75% |
| 1984 | 1,098 | 80.79% | 239 | 17.59% | 22 | 1.62% |
| 1988 | 825 | 69.27% | 354 | 29.72% | 12 | 1.01% |
| 1992 | 635 | 48.85% | 298 | 22.92% | 367 | 28.23% |
| 1996 | 757 | 58.01% | 325 | 24.90% | 223 | 17.09% |
| 2000 | 888 | 78.79% | 190 | 16.86% | 49 | 4.35% |
| 2004 | 1,064 | 80.97% | 230 | 17.50% | 20 | 1.52% |
| 2008 | 1,017 | 78.65% | 244 | 18.87% | 32 | 2.47% |
| 2012 | 1,022 | 80.09% | 200 | 15.67% | 54 | 4.23% |
| 2016 | 1,116 | 84.93% | 115 | 8.75% | 83 | 6.32% |
| 2020 | 1,118 | 85.47% | 155 | 11.85% | 35 | 2.68% |
| 2024 | 1,108 | 89.79% | 112 | 9.08% | 14 | 1.13% |

The Wyoming Department of Corrections Wyoming Women's Center is located in Lusk. The facility was operated by the Wyoming Board of Charities and Reform until that agency was dissolved as a result of a state constitutional amendment passed in November 1990.

== Education ==
There is one school district, Niobrara County School District 1.

== See also ==
- National Register of Historic Places listings in Niobrara County, Wyoming
- Wyoming
  - List of cities and towns in Wyoming
  - List of counties in Wyoming
  - Wyoming statistical areas
