= Duncan Grant Ranch Rural Historic Landscape =

- U.S. National Register of Historic Places
- U.S. Historic district
- Location within Wyoming Location within the United States
- Coordinates: 41°58′35″N 105°03′36″W
- Built by: Duncan Grant
- NRHP reference No.: 13000047
- Added to NRHP: February 27, 2013

The Duncan Grant Ranch was established by Scottish immigrant Duncan Grant in Platte County, Wyoming in the 1870s. It is a representative example of an immigrant homestead ranch of the late 1800s.

The Duncan Grant Ranch was placed on the National Register of Historic Places on February 27, 2013.
