= Ebenezer Grant House =

Historic house in Connecticut, United States

- U.S. National Register of Historic Places
- U.S. Historic district – Contributing property
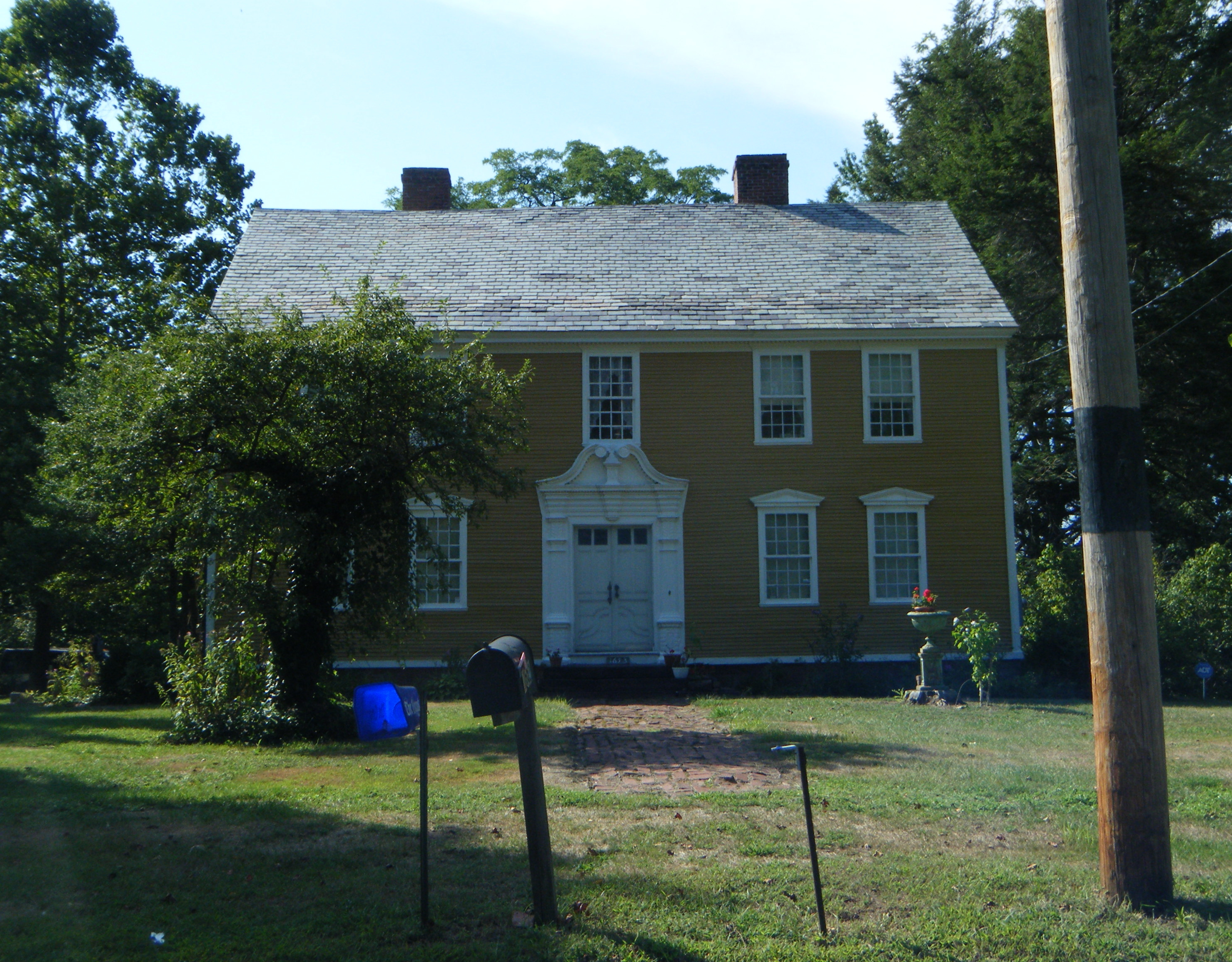

- Location within Connecticut Location within the United States
- Location: 1653 Main Street, East Windsor Hill, Connecticut, South Windsor, Connecticut
- Coordinates: 41°51′5″N 72°36′31″W
- Area: 4.7 acres (1.9 ha)
- Built: 1695, 1757-58
- Built by: Grant, Ebenezer
- Architectural style: Jacobean
- Part of: East Windsor Hill Historic District (ID86001208)
- NRHP reference No.: 77001408

Significant dates
- Added to NRHP: September 19, 1977
- Designated CP: May 30, 1986

The Ebenezer Grant House is a historic house at 1653 Main Street in the village of East Windsor Hill in South Windsor, Connecticut. Built in 1757–58, it is one of the finest examples of regional colonial architecture in the state. Its rear addition is believed to date to 1695, making it one of the state's oldest surviving colonial structures. The house was listed on the National Register of Historic Places in 1977.

== Description and history ==
The Ebenezer Grant House stands in the village of East Windsor Hill, on the west side of Main Street a short way north of its junction with Oxbow Lane. It is a 2 1/2-story wood-frame structure, with a side-gable roof, two interior brick chimneys, and a clapboarded exterior. The main facade is five bays wide, with the main entry at the center. The entry surround is one of the most elaborate known of the regionally distinctive Connecticut River style of colonial entry surrounds. It has fluted pilasters set on high pedestals, and a moulded pediment and broken scrollwork pediment above. Also richly decorated but less ornate are two secondary entrances on the south side, one in the main block and another in the rear ell. The interior also features elaborate Georgian woodwork, with an elaborate central staircase with spiral balusters.

The land that became East Windsor Hill was first settled by Samuel Grant, the son of Matthew Grant, one of Windsor's first settlers. Samuel Grant built a house on this site in 1695, which is believed to be incorporated in the rear ell portion of the later development. The 1757-58 part of the house is described as "among the most elaborate 18th century houses still standing in Connecticut". Its historic importance is magnified by the existence of complete documentation. In addition to its architectural significance, the house also played a role in the American Revolutionary War, serving as a place of confinement for the Tory governor of New Jersey, William Franklin, and British general Richard Prescott. It was moved within its lot by about 25 feet in 1913.

== See also ==
- List of the oldest buildings in Connecticut
- National Register of Historic Places listings in Hartford County, Connecticut
