= William F. Grant House =

Historic house in Maine, United States

- U.S. National Register of Historic Places
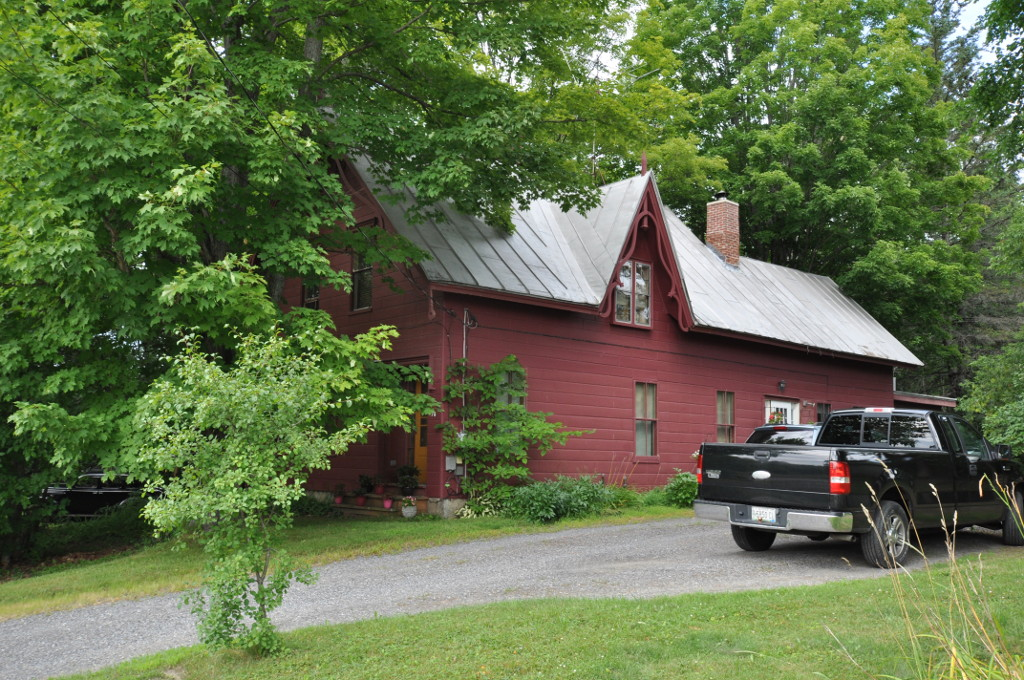

- Location within Maine Location within the United States
- Location: 869 Main St., North Vassalboro, Maine
- Coordinates: 44°28′57″N 69°37′20″W
- Area: 2.2 acres (0.89 ha)
- Built: 1850
- Architectural style: Gothic Revival
- NRHP reference No.: 06000396
- Added to NRHP: May 17, 2006

The William F. Grant House is a historic house at 869 Main Street in North Vassalboro, Maine. Built in 1850 by a Scottish immigrant, it is a distinctive local example of Gothic Revival architecture. It was listed on the National Register of Historic Places in 2006.

== Description and history ==
The Grant House stands near the southern end of the village of North Vassalboro, on the east side of Main Street (Maine State Route 32). It is a 1 1/2-story wood-frame structure, with a steeply pitched gable roof. A lower ell extends the main block to the rear. The building is sided in flushboarding scored to resemble ashlar stone. The main gable and a cross gable on the long south facade are both decorated with carved vergeboard trim with drop pendants at the ends, and there are finial protrusions at the peak of each gable. Windows on the west-facing front facade are framed by drip moulding, and the entrance is flanked by sidelight windows and decorative wood panels. The interior retains many of its original decorative elements, including wall paneling and distinctively cut doors.

The house was built in 1850 by William F. Grant, a Scottish immigrant. A house painter, he was known to paint his house with distinctive colors, effectively as an advertisement of his skills. The house was also stylistically distinctive, apparently the only Gothic Revival house to be built in the village. Grant's sons began in business as carriage painters, but eventually branched out into the manufacture of carriages and wheels.

== See also ==
- National Register of Historic Places listings in Kennebec County, Maine
