= Robert Grant Ranch =

- U.S. National Register of Historic Places
- U.S. Historic district
- Location within Wyoming Location within the United States
- Nearest city: Wheatland, Wyoming
- Coordinates: 41°50′55″N 104°56′54″W
- Area: 75 acres (30 ha)
- Built: 1891
- Built by: Grant, Robert
- NRHP reference No.: 95001073
- Added to NRHP: September 7, 1995

The Robert Grant Ranch was established in 1891 in Platte County, Wyoming by Scottish immigrant Robert Grant. The ranch represents a complete homestead with a representative collection of buildings and structures associated with a self-sufficient ranching operation in Wyoming. Robert Grant was born in 1847 in Motherwell, Scotland. He married Margaret Grant in Bellish in 1867, where Robert was a coal miner. The Grants emigrated to the United States in 1878 with their sons Tom and Robert, Jr. to join some of Margaret's family members in Wyoming. They established a 160-acre (65 ha) homestead, which they sold in 1884. Their new home became the Grant Ranch. After establishing an irrigation system the family built a permanent house in 1890. After 1900 Margaret and Robert retired to Wheatland, and the ranch was taken over by their daughter Clara and son Duncan, both born after the move to Wyoming. After marrying, Duncan took over ranch operations and was eventually joined by son Robert Grant III.

Significant ranch structures include the wood and stone main house (1891–94), a stone outhouse (c. 1890), a stone chicken house (c. 1890), a dipping vat (c. 1910), a lime kiln (c. 1890), and irrigation structures. Later additions included a bunkhouse/schoolhouse (c. 1917), a brooder house (c. 1930), a coal shed (moved to the ranch c. 1920) and a playhouse from another site. The main house is a 1-1/2 story house measuring about 30 feet (9.1 m) by 30 feet (9.1 m), with a hipped roof. The walls are thick local limestone covered with lime and sand stucco. A kitchen addition is 16 feet (4.9 m) by 24 feet (7.3 m).

The Robert Grant Ranch was placed on the National Register of Historic Places on September 7, 1995.
