= Guernsey State Park =

State park in Wyoming, United States

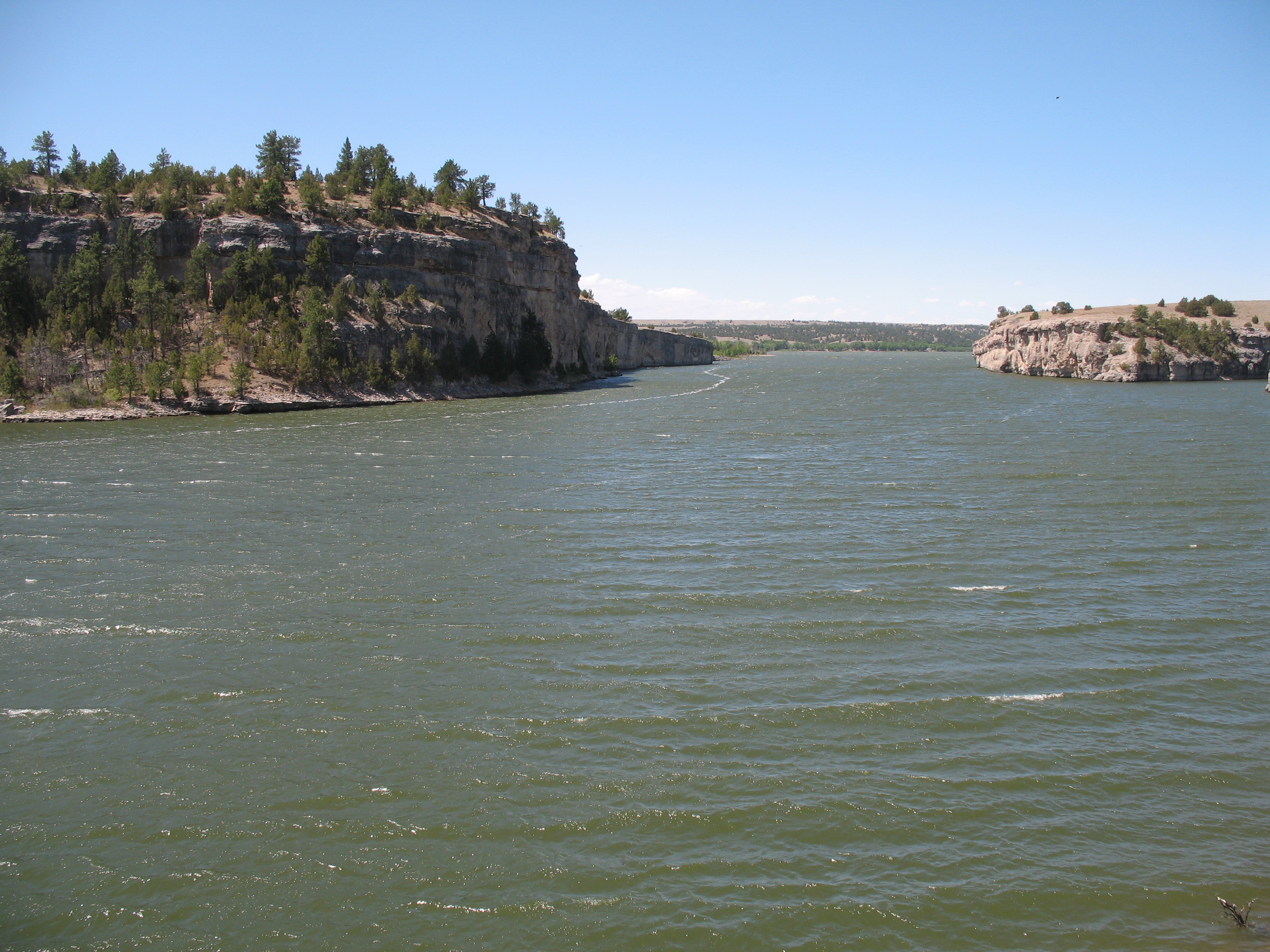

- Location within Wyoming Location within the United States
- Location: Platte County, Wyoming, United States
- Coordinates: 42°19′3″N 104°49′11″W
- Area: 8,631 acres (3,493 ha)
- Elevation: 4,423 ft (1,348 m)
- Established: 1934
- Administrator: Wyoming State Parks, Historic Sites & Trails
- Designation: Wyoming state park
- Website: Official website
- Lake Guernsey State Park
- U.S. National Register of Historic Places
- U.S. National Historic Landmark District
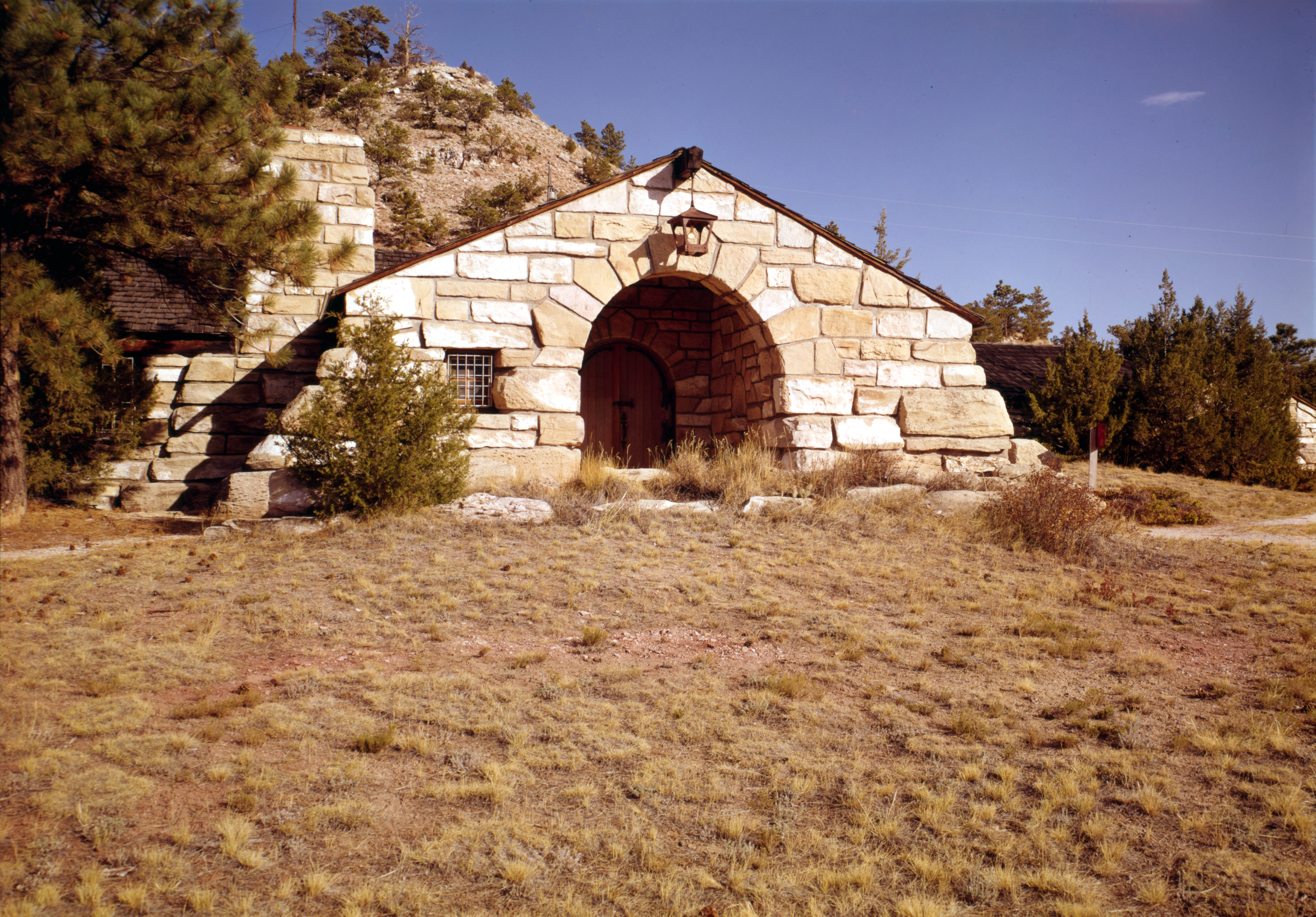
- Guernsey State Park Museum
- Area: 3,760 acres (original); 8,602 acres (increase)
- Built: 1934-39
- Architect: Roland Pray (original); S. R. Deboer; Richard G. Redell (expanded)
- Architectural style: National Park Service Rustic, Bungalow/Craftsman
- NRHP reference No.: 80004051 (original); 97001260 (increase)

Significant dates
- Added to NRHP: August 26, 1980 (original); September 25, 1997 (increase)
- Designated NHLD: September 25, 1997

Guernsey State Park is a public recreation area surrounding the Guernsey Reservoir, an impoundment of the North Platte River, one mile northwest of the town of Guernsey in Platte County, Wyoming. The state park has campgrounds, boat ramps and hiking trails as well as exceptional examples of structures created by the Civilian Conservation Corps in the 1930s. Facilities are managed for the Bureau of Reclamation by the Wyoming Division of State Parks and Historic Sites.

== History ==
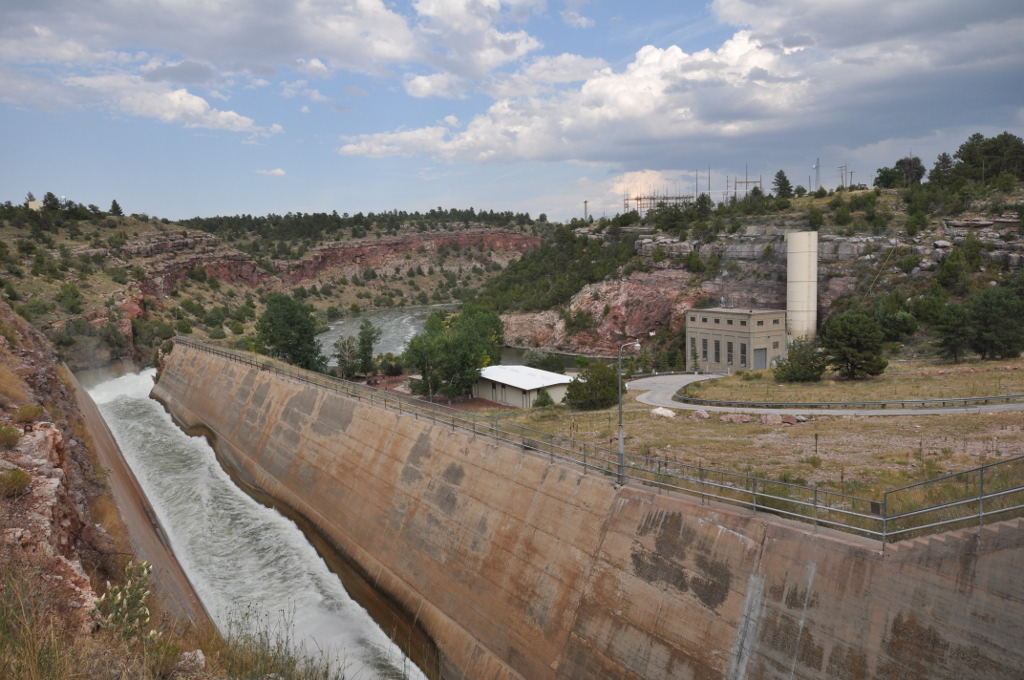
Guernsey State Park Power Plant

The park began with the construction of the Guernsey Dam, started in 1925 and completed in 1927. Between 1934 and 1939, workers with the Civilian Conservation Corps created recreational facilities on the land surrounding the dam's reservoir. Park management fell to the state of Wyoming in 1957.

Lake Guernsey State Park (also known as Guernsey State Park Historic District, Lake Guernsey Park, Guernsey Lake Park, or Guernsey State Park) was declared a National Historic Landmark District in 1997 for its design history and construction. The park's design was the result of the first collaboration between the National Park Service and the Bureau of Reclamation, and its infrastructure was built by Civilian Conservation Corps crews. The historic district contains 60 contributing resources: 14 buildings, three sites and 43 structures, as well as 46 non-contributing resources.

== Features ==
The Guernsey State Park Museum offers information about the CCC and the natural and cultural history of the area. The park contains a separate National Historic Landmark, the Oregon Trail Ruts. Register Cliff, another feature of the Oregon Trail listed on the National Register of Historic Places, is located two miles southeast of the park.

== Activities and amenities ==
The park has seven campgrounds and three boat ramps. Fish species include walleye, yellow perch and channel catfish. Fish populations are affected by the reservoir's twice-yearly draw-downs.
