= William H. Grant House (Richmond, Virginia) =

Historic house in Virginia, United States

- U.S. National Register of Historic Places
- Virginia Landmarks Register
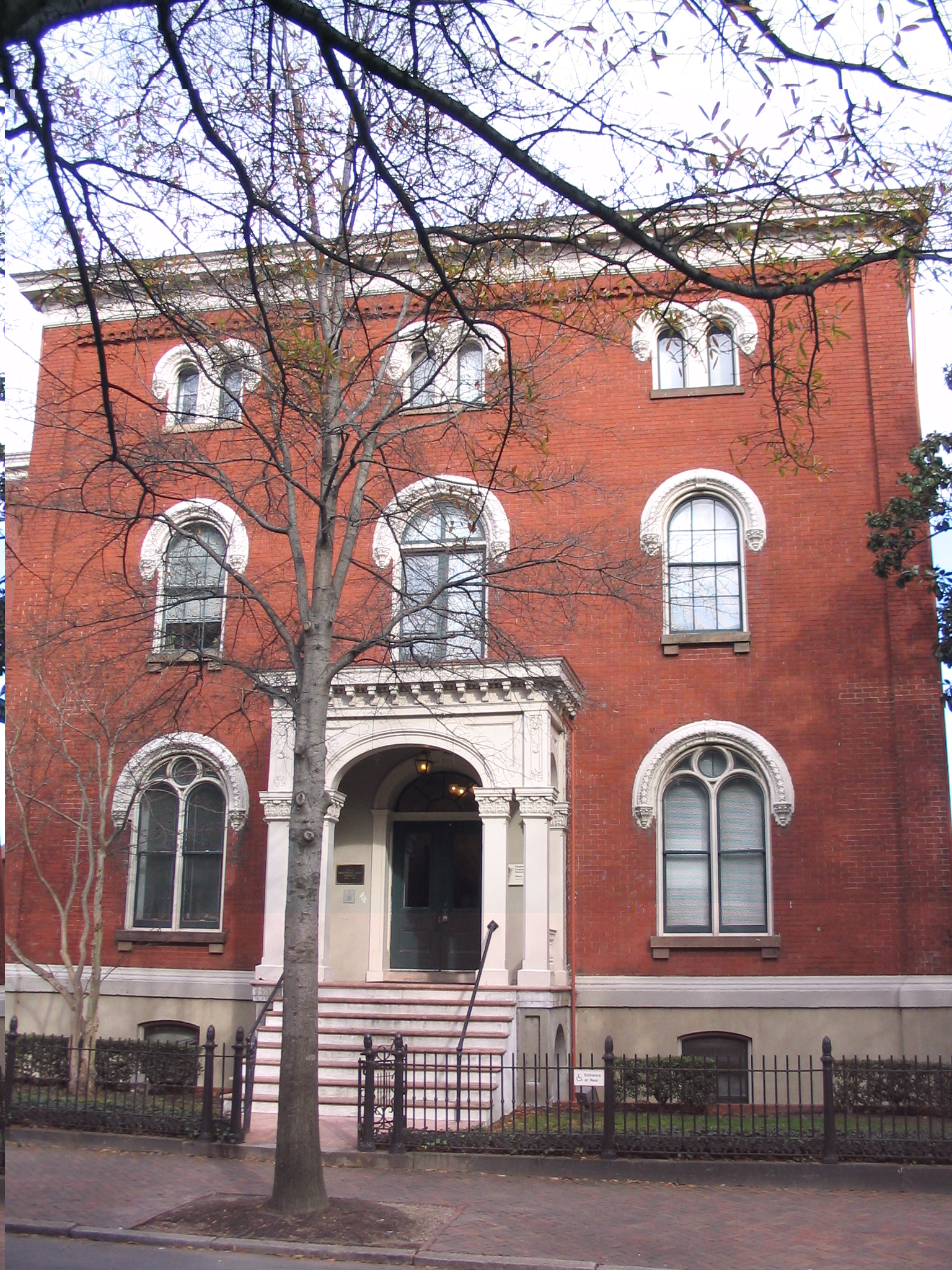
- Location: 1008 E. Clay St., Richmond, Virginia
- Coordinates: 37°32′30″N 77°25′52″W
- Area: 0.8 acres (0.32 ha)
- Built: 1857
- Architectural style: Italianate
- NRHP reference No.: 69000356
- VLR No.: 127-0017

Significant dates
- Added to NRHP: April 16, 1969
- Designated VLR: November 5, 1968

The William H. Grant House, also known as Sheltering Arms Hospital, is a historic house located in Richmond, Virginia. It was built in 1857, and is a large, three-story brick townhouse in the Italianate style. It features a small, richly ornamented arched front porch supported by coupled square columns. In 1892, the house was acquired by the Sheltering Arms Hospital, who occupied it until 1965. It is connected to the Benjamin Watkins Leigh House.

It was listed on the National Register of Historic Places in 1969.

Currently, the building is owned by Virginia Commonwealth University and houses office space for the Department of Dermatology and Risk Management unit.
