= Niobrara County High School =

Coordinates: 42.7596°N 104.4596°W

Location
- 109 School Avenue; Lusk, (Niobrara County), Wyoming 82225; United States

Information
- Type: Public high school
- Principal: Katherine Kruse
- Staff: 26.39 (FTE)
- Enrollment: 340 (2023-2024)
- Student to teacher ratio: 12.88
- Colors: Red and white
- Nickname: Tigers

Niobrara County High School is located in Lusk, Wyoming, United States. Serving students grades 9-12, the high school is governed by Niobrara County School District #1.

== Notable alumni ==
- James E. Barrett, United States federal judge
- Douglas W. Owsley, Division Head of Physical Anthropology at the Smithsonian's National Museum of Natural History
