= Guernsey, Wyoming =

- Town
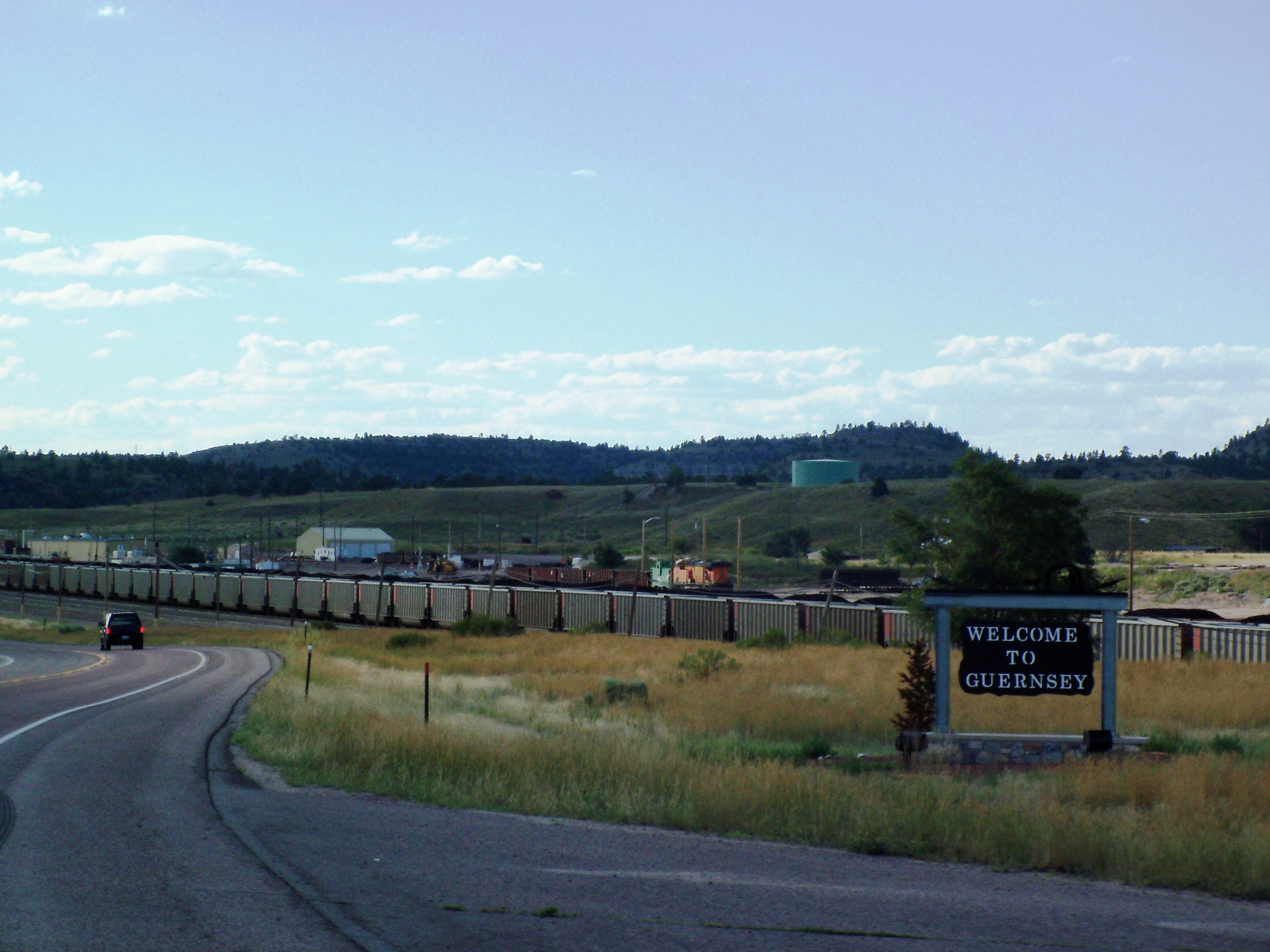
- Welcome to Guernsey sign

- Location of Guernsey in Platte County, Wyoming.
- Coordinates: 42°16′02″N 104°44′50″W
- Country: United States
- State: Wyoming
- County: Platte

Area
  - Total: 1.04 sq mi (2.69 km^{2})
  - Land: 1.02 sq mi (2.65 km^{2})
  - Water: 0.015 sq mi (0.04 km^{2})
- Elevation: 4,354 ft (1,327 m)

Population (2020)
  - Total: 1,130
  - Density: 1,097.0/sq mi (423.54/km^{2})
- Time zone: UTC-7 (Mountain (MST))
  - Summer (DST): UTC-6 (MDT)
- ZIP code: 82214
- Area code: 307
- FIPS code: 56-34320
- GNIS feature ID: 2412714
- Website: www.togwy.us

Guernsey is a town in Platte County, Wyoming, United States. As of the 2020 census, Guernsey had a population of 1,130.

The town was named for C. A. Guernsey, a cattle rancher.

== Geography ==
According to the United States Census Bureau, the town has a total area of 1.04 square miles (2.69 km^{2}), of which 1.02 square miles (2.64 km^{2}) is land and 0.02 square miles (0.05 km^{2}) is water.

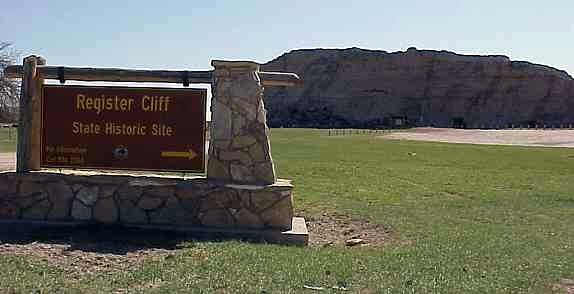
State Marker and Register Cliff

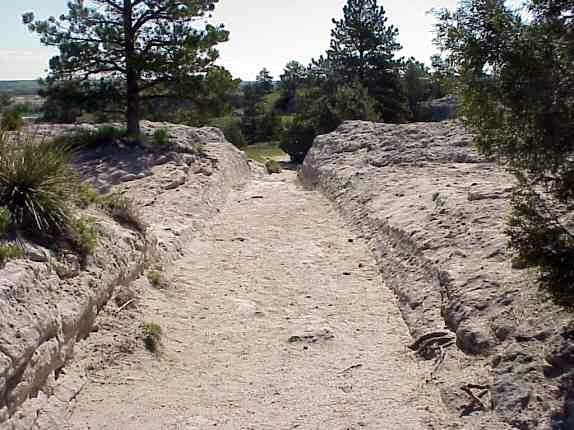
Oregon Trail ruts near Guernsey

== Demographics ==
Historical population
Census	Pop.	Note	%±
1910	274		—
1920	372		35.8%
1930	656		76.3%
1940	603		−8.1%
1950	721		19.6%
1960	800		11.0%
1970	793		−0.9%
1980	1,512		90.7%
1990	1,155		−23.6%
2000	1,147		−0.7%
2010	1,147		0.0%
2020	1,130		−1.5%
U.S. Decennial Census

=== 2010 census ===
As of the census of 2010, there were 1,147 people, 504 households, and 315 families living in the town. The population density was 1,124.5 inhabitants per square mile (434.2/km^{2}). There were 581 housing units at an average density of 569.6 per square mile (219.9/km^{2}). The racial makeup of the town was 93.6% White, 0.2% African American, 0.5% Native American, 0.4% Asian, 3.5% from other races, and 1.7% from two or more races. Hispanic or Latino of any race were 13.1% of the population.

There were 504 households, of which 26.6% had children under the age of 18 living with them, 48.0% were married couples living together, 9.5% had a female householder with no husband present, 5.0% had a male householder with no wife present, and 37.5% were non-families. 30.4% of all households were made up of individuals, and 11.1% had someone living alone who was 65 years of age or older. The average household size was 2.28 and the average family size was 2.83.

The median age in the town was 44.6 years. 21.7% of residents were under the age of 18; 7.7% were between the ages of 18 and 24; 21.2% were from 25 to 44; 31.3% were from 45 to 64; and 18.2% were 65 years of age or older. The gender makeup of the town was 48.1% male and 51.9% female.

=== 2000 census ===
As of the census of 2000, there were 1,147 people, 504 households, and 312 families living in the town. The population density was 1,067.3 people per square mile (413.9/km^{2}). There were 612 housing units at an average density of 569.5 per square mile (220.8/km^{2}). The racial makeup of the town was 91.54% White, 0.17% African American, 1.05% Native American, 0.17% Asian, 3.75% from other races, and 3.31% from two or more races. Hispanic or Latino of any race were 8.11% of the population.

There were 504 households, out of which 30.4% had children under the age of 18 living with them, 49.0% were married couples living together, 9.9% had a female householder with no husband present, and 37.9% were non-families. 33.3% of all households were made up of individuals, and 15.7% had someone living alone who was 65 years of age or older. The average household size was 2.28 and the average family size was 2.89.

In the town, the population was spread out, with 26.8% under the age of 18, 7.1% from 18 to 24, 23.8% from 25 to 44, 26.9% from 45 to 64, and 15.3% who were 65 years of age or older. The median age was 40 years. For every 100 females, there were 96.4 males. For every 100 females age 18 and over, there were 89.6 males.

The median income for a household in the town was $30,758, and the median income for a family was $38,958. Males had a median income of $37,778 versus $17,656 for females. The per capita income for the town was $14,897. About 7.6% of families and 10.9% of the population were below the poverty line, including 11.7% of those under age 18 and 19.6% of those age 65 or over.

== Education ==
Public education in the town of Guernsey is provided by Platte County School District #2. Campuses serving the town include Guernsey-Sunrise Elementary School (grades K-6) and Guernsey-Sunrise Junior/Senior High School (grades 7–12).

Guernsey has a public library, a branch of the Platte County Public Library System.

== Highways ==
- U.S. Highway 26
- WYO 270 (Hartville Hwy)
- WYO 317 (Lake Side Drive)

== Airport ==
Camp Guernsey Airport / Guernsey Municipal Airport serves the National Guard/Space Rangers of Space Force Camp and the Town of Guernsey.

== See also ==
- Guernsey State Park
- Oregon Trail
- Register Cliff
