= Wyoming Highway 251 =

State highway in Wyoming, United States

Wyoming Highway 251
- Casper Mountain Road; S. Wolcott Street
- WYO 251 highlighted in red

Route information
- Maintained by WYDOT, City of Casper
- Length: 8.99 mi (14.47 km)

Major junctions
- South end: CR 504 / CR 505 in Casper Mountain
- North end: I-25 BL / US 20 Bus. / US 26 Bus. / US 87 Bus. in Casper

Location
- Country: United States
- State: Wyoming
- Counties: Natrona

Highway system
- Wyoming State Highway System; Interstate; US; State
| ← WYO 241 | → WYO 252 |

Wyoming Highway 251 (WYO 251) is an 8.99-mile-long (14.47 km) north-south Wyoming state road located in Natrona County.

== Route description ==
Wyoming Highway 251 begins its southern end at Natrona CR 505 in the census-designated place (CDP) of Casper Mountain, south of the City of Casper. The southern terminus of WYO 251 lies on the Casper Mountain summit at an elevation of 8,485 feet and provides access to the Hogadon Ski Area. Natrona CR 505 continues southwest of the Casper Mountain area and meets County Route 401, which links to Wyoming Highway 487. Highway 251 proceeds northward as it zig-zags down off Casper Mountain. At the base, the southern terminus of Wyoming Highway 252 (Garden Creek Road) is intersected at just under 4 miles. Past WYO 252, Highway 251 now on a straighter course, enters the Casper city limits and reaches Wyoming Highway 258 also known as Wyoming Boulevard at 5.7 miles. Highway 251 continues northward and changes names to South Wolcott Street. WYO 251 gently curves around the west side of the Casper Golf Club and the east side of Casper College before entering downtown Casper. The northern terminus of Highway 251 lies at the business routes of I-25/US 20/US 26/US 87 (E. 1st Street) in Casper.

The last 2.01 miles (3.2 km) of Highway 251 are maintained by the City of Casper.

== Major intersections ==
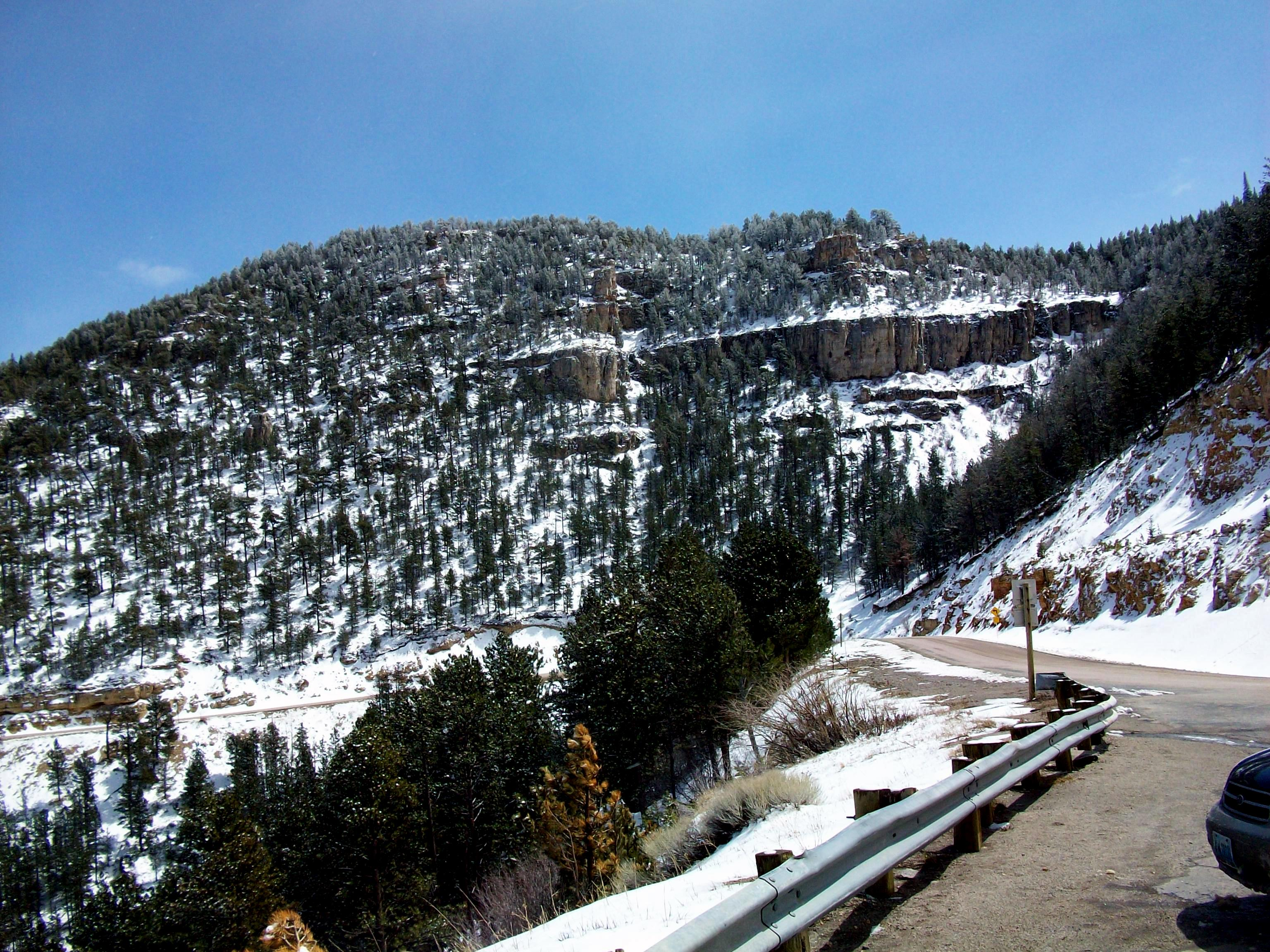
Wyoming Highway 251 climbing Casper Mountain

The entire route is in Natrona County.

| Location | mi | km | Destinations | Notes |
|---|---|---|---|---|
| Casper Mountain | 0.000 | 0.000 | CR 504 west / CR 505 south | Southern terminus; Casper Mountain Road continues as CR 505 |
| Casper Mountain | 3.95 | 6.36 | WYO 252 | Counterclockwise terminus of WYO 252 |
| Casper | 5.86 | 9.43 | WYO 258 (Wyoming Boulevard) | |
| Casper | 8.99 | 14.47 | 1st Street ( I-25 BL / US 20 Bus. / US 26 Bus. / US 87 Bus.) | Northern terminus |
| Casper | 8.99 | 14.47 | Durbin Street | One-way street, outbound access only; continuation beyond northern terminus |
| Casper | 8.99 | 14.47 | Wolcott Street | One-way street, inbound access only |
1.000 mi = 1.609 km; 1.000 km = 0.621 mi: Route transition
