= Wyoming Highway 257 =

State highway in Wyoming, United States

Wyoming Highway 257
- Casper West Belt
- WYO 257 highlighted in red

Route information
- Maintained by WYDOT
- Length: 7.302 mi (11.751 km)
- Existed: 2012–present
- History: Completed in 2015

Major junctions
- South end: WYO 220 near Red Butte
- North end: US 20 / US 26 / US 20 Bus. / US 26 Bus. near Mills

Location
- Country: United States
- State: Wyoming
- Counties: Natrona

Highway system
- Wyoming State Highway System; Interstate; US; State
← WYO 256	→ WYO 258

Wyoming Highway 257 (WYO 257), also known as the Casper West Belt, is a state highway in Natrona County, Wyoming. The 7.3-mile (11.7 km) highway forms part of a bypass around Casper and Mills, connecting WYO 220 in the south to U.S. Route 20 (US 20) and US 26 in the north. The road itself continues east on an expressway carrying US 20 and US 26 to a junction with Interstate 25 (I-25).

The highway was proposed in the late 1990s to relieve truck congestion in Casper and Mills, particularly on WYO 220, and approved in 2002. The project used federal funding and began construction in 2013 after a series of eminent domain disputes delayed planning. WYO 257 opened to traffic on December 31, 2015.

== Route description ==
WYO 257 begins southwest of Red Butte at a junction with WYO 220, a divided highway that connects Alcova to Casper. The highway travels north across the North Platte River and begins ascending a plateau, gaining a northbound truck climbing lane in the process. After passing a historic marker commemorating the Oregon Trail, WYO 257 turns northeast towards the outskirts of Mills and passes a small housing subdivision in the process. The highway then intersects Robertson Road and enters an industrial area before it terminates at an intersection with US 20 and US 26. The road continues east onto the Shoshoni Bypass, an expressway carrying US 20 and US 26 to an interchange with I-25.

The 7.3-mile-long (11.7 km), two-lane highway primarily serves as a truck bypass of Casper; most of it has a speed limit of 65 miles per hour (105 km/h). It is maintained by the Wyoming Department of Transportation (WYDOT), who conduct an annual survey of traffic volume that is expressed in terms of annual average daily traffic (AADT), a measure of traffic volume for any average day of the year. WYDOT measured an average daily volume of 1,980 vehicles, including 650 trucks, on WYO 257 in 2020.

== History ==
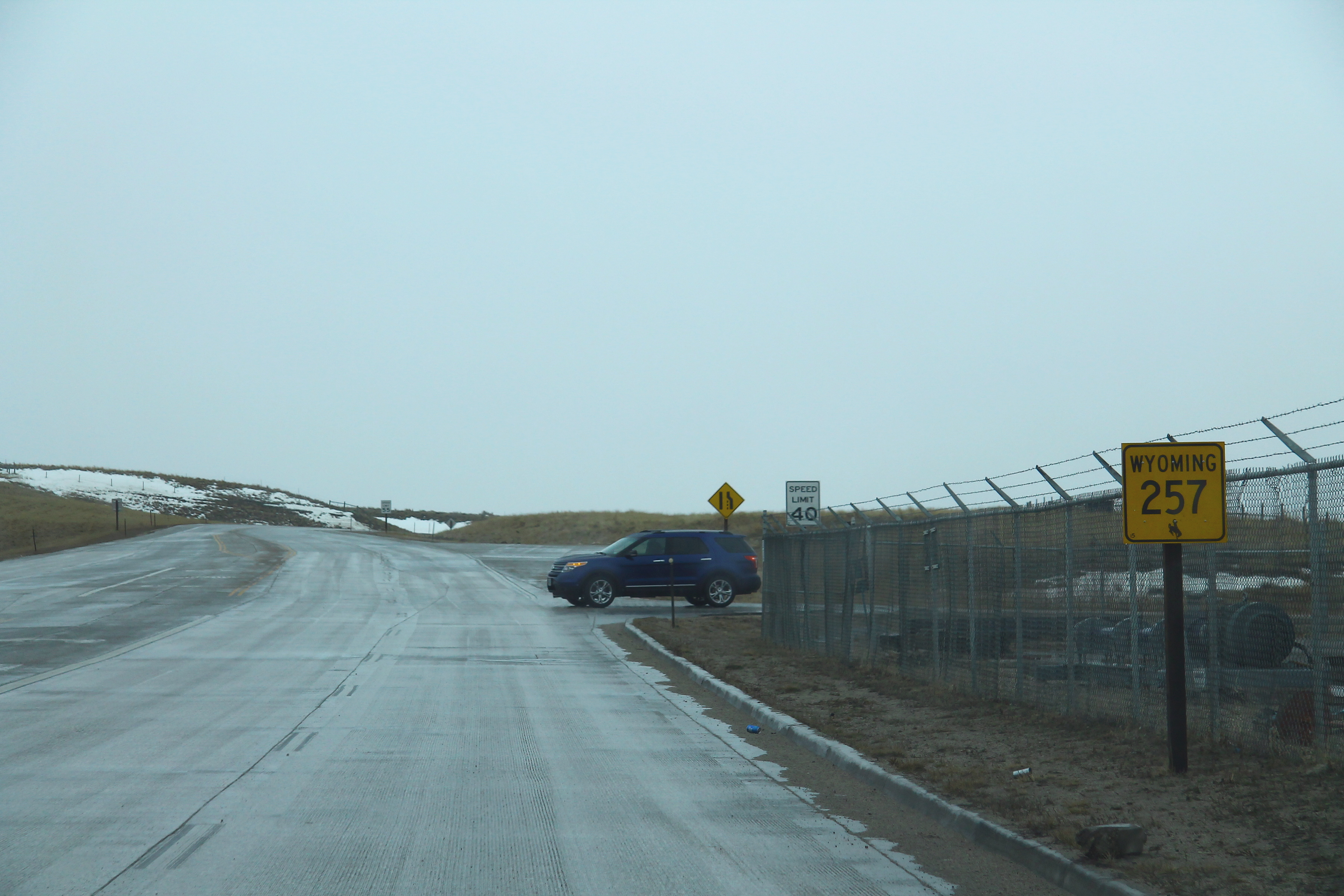
Looking southbound on WYO 257 near its northern terminus

A western bypass of Casper to reduce truck congestion in the city and on WYO 220 was proposed by the local metropolitan planning organization in 1997 and was the subject of a feasibility study begun by WYDOT in 1998. The city already had an eastern bypass, named Wyoming Boulevard (part of WYO 258), that was constructed in the 1970s and was also studied for replacement with an eastern belt to complement the proposed western belt. The Casper West Belt, which would connect WYO 220 to US 20 and US 26 at the Shoshoni Bypass, was criticized by local residents for potentially disrupting scenic views; at public hearings, WYDOT and its consultants were also criticized for not responding to public feedback and not accommodating the needs of local residents.

The Casper City Council endorsed the West Belt proposal in July 2000, but requested that WYDOT improve its communication with residents on the project's impacts. The project had five alternatives, with the consultant-recommended alignment costing up to $37 million (equivalent to $63.6 million in 2023 dollars) and serving 4,000 to 6,000 vehicles per day, including 350 to 450 trucks. The recommended route was later modified to reduce the local impact of the highway and was adopted by WYDOT as the preferred alternative in their 2002 study. The modified alternative also included eliminating part of Poison Spider Road, with traffic redirected north to Robertson Road to cross the West Belt.

The federal Safe, Accountable, Flexible, Efficient Transportation Equity Act: A Legacy for Users, passed by Congress in 2005, earmarked $21 million (equivalent to $31.5 million in 2023 dollars) for the construction of the West Belt pending a match from the state government. Construction and material costs increased during the project's planning period, necessitating a split into two phases; overall pre-inflation costs were estimated at over $50 million (equivalent to $69.5 million in 2023 dollars) by 2008. The initial phase of construction to grade the highway was planned to begin in 2008, but was delayed to 2010 before being accelerated to a 2009 start due to funding availability. Construction was, however, delayed by an eminent domain lawsuit that was appealed to the U.S. District Court for Wyoming in December 2010. The U.S. District Court ruled in favor of WYDOT, allowing for condemnation procedures to continue, and the lawsuit was settled in early 2011.

Land condemnation of the highway's right-of-way and additional land for future expansion was completed in January 2012, following additional negotiations with property owners and a hearing in the Natrona County District Court. The $19.2 million contract (equivalent to $25.2 million in 2023 dollars) to construct the first phase, including the North Platte River bridge, was awarded in March 2013 and grading was completed the following year. The second phase to pave the new highway began in October 2014 with the awarding of a $16.6 million contract (equivalent to $21 million in 2023 dollars) to a Utah firm.

The West Belt was added to the state highway system as WYO 257 in 2012, and opened to the public on December 31, 2015, over 15 years after it was first proposed. It cost a total of $36 million to construct (equivalent to $45.2 million in 2023 dollars), with 90 percent of funds provided by the federal government, and was awarded the President's Project of the Year from the Wyoming Engineering Society in 2017. Following a fatal crash on the new highway six months after it opened, WYDOT installed rumble strips and lowered the speed limit at the Robertson Road intersection to prevent future collisions. Long-term plans call for up to 13 signalized intersections spaced 1/2 mile (0.80 km) apart on the highway to prevent unwanted congestion during industrial development of the corridor.

== Major intersections ==
The entire route is in Natrona County.

Location	mi	km	Destinations	Notes
	0.000	0.000	WYO 220 – Casper, Rawlins	Southern terminus
	7.302	11.751	US 20 Bus. / US 26 Bus. east / US 20 / US 26 to I-25 / US 87 – Sheridan, Cheyenne, Shoshoni, Port of Entry	Northern terminus; highway continues as US 20/US 26 east
1.000 mi = 1.609 km; 1.000 km = 0.621 mi
