= Wyoming Highway 258 =

State highway in Wyoming, United States

Wyoming Highway 258
- Wyoming Boulevard; Casper Beltline
- WYO 258 highlighted in red

Route information
- Maintained by WYDOT, City of Casper
- Length: 10.58 mi (17.03 km)

Major junctions
- Beltway around Casper
- West end: US 20 Bus. / US 26 Bus. in Casper
- WYO 220 WYO 252; WYO 251 I-25
- East end: US 20 / US 26 / US 87 in Evansville

Location
- Country: United States
- State: Wyoming
- Counties: Natrona

Highway system
- Wyoming State Highway System; Interstate; US; State
← WYO 257	→ WYO 259

Wyoming Highway 258 (WYO 258) is a 10.58-mile-long (17.03 km) state highway in Wyoming, known as Wyoming Boulevard and acts as a two-lane bypass around the western, southern, and eastern sides of the City of Casper.

== Route description ==
Wyoming Highway 258 begins its western end at US 20 Business/US 26 Business (Yellowstone Highway) in Mills and from there travels counter-clockwise around Casper. WYO 258 heads south and crosses the North Platte River before intersecting W. 13th Street, which also provides access to Fort Caspar. Continuing south, WYO 258 passes along the western side of the Central Wyoming Fair Grounds and briefly parallels the North Platte River a short distance before intersecting Wyoming Highway 220 (CY Avenue), the main artery for traffic coming into Casper from the west. Past WYO 220, Highway 258 gradually turns eastward before reaching the southern terminus of Wyoming Highway 252 (S. Poplar Street). Under 1 mile later, Wyoming Highway 251 (Casper Mountain Road) is intersected which travels to Casper College and Casper Mountain. Highway 258 continues east for a small distance and then begins to turn northeast as it travels around the southeastern outskirts of Casper and passes west of the Casper County Club. Now mainly directed north, WYO 258 travels through the eastern neighborhoods of Casper and intersects busy east-west 2nd Street. Casper's Eastridge Mall lies on the southeastern side of this intersection. A third of mile north of that intersection, Interstate 25 is intersected at exit 185 as WYO 258 enters the Town of Evansville. Just past the interstate, WYO 258 reaches its eastern end at US 20/US 26/US 87 (Yellowstone Highway) after 10.58 miles (17.03 km). The roadway itself continues north as Curtis Avenue north through Evansville.

Wyoming Highway 258 is maintained by the City of Casper, however when Highway 258 momentarily travels out of the city, state maintenance will begin and end as it does southeast of the city. Casper has taken over maintenance of the portions of the route within its city limits, but for signage purposes the route is still Highway 258.

== Major intersections ==
The entire route is in Natrona County.

Location	mi	km	Destinations	Notes
Casper	0.00	0.00	US 20 Bus. / US 26 Bus.	Western terminus of WYO 258
Casper	1.00	1.61	W. 13th Street	Fort Casper Road/Entrance to Fort Caspar
Casper	2.16	3.48	WYO 220 (CY Avenue)	
Casper	4.06	6.53	WYO 252 (South Poplar Street)	
Casper	4.76	7.66	WYO 251 (Casper Mountain Road)	
Casper	10.16	16.35	2nd Street	
Evansville	10.36	16.67	I-25 – Cheyenne, Billings	Exit 185 (I-25)
Evansville	10.58	17.03	US 20 / US 26 / US 87	Eastern Terminus of WYO 258
1.000 mi = 1.609 km; 1.000 km = 0.621 mi
