= Wyoming Highway 77 =

State highway in Carbon County, Wyoming, United States

Wyoming Highway 77
- Old Shirley Basin Road
- WYO 77 highlighted in red

Route information
- Maintained by WYDOT
- Length: 22.18 mi (35.70 km)
- Existed: Mid 1970s–present
- Restrictions: Closed winters

Major junctions
- South end: WYO 487 north of Medicine Bow
- North end: WYO 487 near Casper

Location
- Country: United States
- State: Wyoming
- Counties: Carbon

Highway system
- Wyoming State Highway System; Interstate; US; State
| ← WYO 76 | → WYO 78 |
| ← WYO 452 | → WYO 514 |

Wyoming Highway 77 (WYO 77) is a 22.18-mile (35.70 km) remote state highway in northeastern Carbon County, Wyoming, United States, that forms a western loop off of Wyoming Highway 487 (WYO 487), and connects with WYO 487 north of Medicine Bow and again south of Casper.

== Route description ==
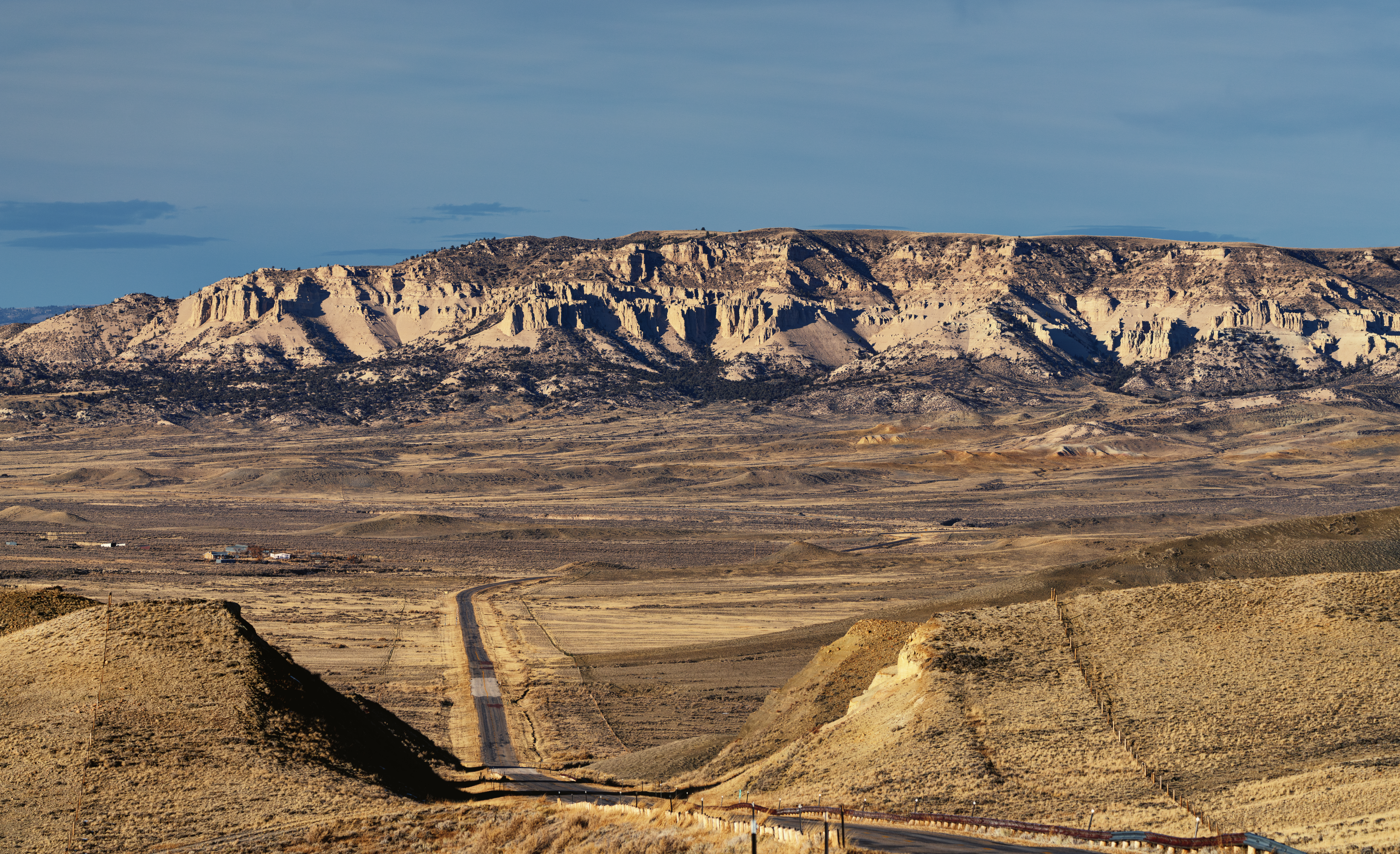
South on WYO 77, with the Shirley Mountains in the distance, December 2024

WYO 77 begins at a T intersection with WYO 487, about 20 miles (32 km) north of Medicine Bow. From its southern terminus it heads northwesterly for roughly 10 miles (16 km) before turning north. After heading northerly for roughly 22 miles (35 km), WYO 77 reaches its northern terminus at another t intersection with WYO 478, approximately one mile (1.6 km) west of the Shirley Rim Rest Area and about 30 miles (48 km) south of Capser.

The entirety of WYO 77 maintains a speed limit of 65 miles per hour (105 km/h) and is closed during winters.

== Major intersections ==
The entire route is in Carbon County.

| Location | mi | km | Destinations | Notes |
|---|---|---|---|---|
| | 0.00 | 0.00 | WYO 487 north – WYO 77 WYO 487 south – Medicine Bow, Laramie | Southern terminus; T intersection |
| | 22.18 | 35.70 | WYO 487 north – WYO 220, Casper WYO 487 south – WYO 77 | Northern terminus; T intersection |
1.000 mi = 1.609 km; 1.000 km = 0.621 mi

== See also ==
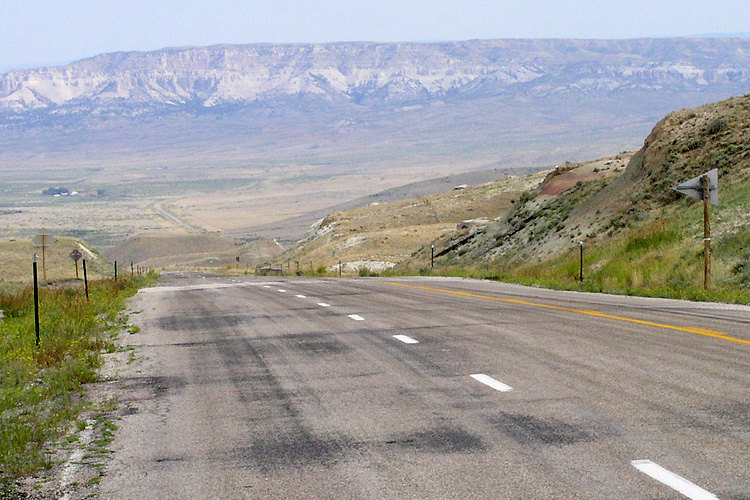
View atop WYO 77's highest point looking north, August 2008

- List of state highways in Wyoming
