= Wyoming Highway 253 =

State highway in Natrona County, Wyoming, United States

Wyoming Highway 253
- Hat Six Road
- WYO 253 highlighted in red

Route information
- Maintained by WYDOT
- Length: 10.90 mi (17.54 km)

Major junctions
- South end: CR 606 near Natrona-Converse County Line
- I-25 in Evansville
- North end: US 20 / US 26 / US 87 / WYO 256 in Evansville

Location
- Country: United States
- State: Wyoming
- Counties: Natrona

Highway system
- Wyoming State Highway System; Interstate; US; State
← WYO 252	→ WYO 254

Wyoming Highway 253 (WYO 253), Hat Six Road, is a 10.90-mile (17.54 km) state highway in eastern Natrona County, Wyoming, United States, that connects Natrona County Road 606 (CR 606), southeast of Casper, with U.S. Route 20 / U.S. Route 26 / U.S. Route 87 (US 20 / US 26 / US 87) and Wyoming Highway 256 (WYO 256) in Evansville.

== Route description ==
WYO 253 begins at the north end of CR 606 (Hat Six Road), near the Natrona-Converse county line and southeast of Casper. From its southern terminus heads northerly and promptly connects with the north end of Natrona County Road 607 (Smith Creek Road). From there, WYO 253 travels generally northwest. As it enters Evansville, WYO 253 has a diamond interchange with Interstate 25 (Exit 182) at 10.35 miles (16.66 km) and shortly thereafter reaches its northern terminus at an intersection with US 20 / US 26 / US 87 (East Yellowstone Highway / Old Glenrock Highway) and the southern terminus of WYO 256 (Cole Creek Road). The mileposts for Highway 253 increase from north to south.

== Major intersections ==
The entire route is in Natrona County.

Location	mi	km	Destinations	Notes
	0.00	0.00	CR 606 (Hat Six Road)	Southern terminus; WYO 253 becomes CR 606
	10.35	16.66	I-25 east – Glenrock, Douglas I-25 west – Casper, Sheridan	Exit 182 on I-25; diamond interchange
Evansville	10.90	17.54	US 20 east / US 26 east / US 87 north (East Yellowstone Hwy / Old Glenrock Hwy) – Glenrock US 20 west / US 26 west / US 87 south (East Yellowstone Hwy / Old Glenrock Hwy) – Casper	
Evansville	10.90	17.54	WYO 256 north	Continuation north beyond northern terminus
1.000 mi = 1.609 km; 1.000 km = 0.621 mi: Route transition

== See also ==
- List of state highways in Wyoming
