= Wyoming Highway 252 =

State highway in Wyoming, United States

Wyoming Highway 252
- Garden Creek Road; S. Poplar Street
- WYO 252 highlighted in red

Route information
- Maintained by WYDOT
- Length: 4.37 mi (7.03 km)

Major junctions
- South end: WYO 251
- North end: WYO 258 in Casper

Location
- Country: United States
- State: Wyoming
- Counties: Natrona

Highway system
- Wyoming State Highway System; Interstate; US; State
← WYO 251	→ WYO 253

Wyoming Highway 252 (WYO 252) is a 4.37-mile-long (7.03 km) Wyoming state road in Natrona County, serving the areas just south of the City of Casper. It is locally known as Garden Creek Road from WYO 251 to the Casper city line where it becomes South Poplar Street.

== Route description ==
Wyoming Highway 252 begins its southern end at Wyoming Highway 251 (Casper Mountain Road) south of Casper. Highway 252 proceeds southwest for a just under a mile before turning west. However, one mile later WYO 252 turns again, this time north as it crosses Garden Creek for which it is named after. Highway 251 now will roughly parallel Garden Creek for the remainder of its routing to Casper. At 3.99 miles, WYO 251 enters Casper and shortly thereafter reaches Wyoming Highway 258 (Wyoming Boulevard) its northern terminus at 4.37 miles. The mileposts for Highway 252 increase from south to north.

== Major intersections ==
The entire route is in Natrona County.

Location	mi	km	Destinations	Notes
Casper Mountain	0.00	0.00	WYO 251	Southern terminus
Casper	4.37	7.03	WYO 258 (Wyoming Boulevard)	Northern terminus
1.000 mi = 1.609 km; 1.000 km = 0.621 mi
