= Wyoming Highway 256 =

State highway in Natrona County, Wyoming, United States

Wyoming Highway 256
- Cole Creek Road
- WYO 256 highlighted in red

Route information
- Maintained by WYDOT
- Length: 2.67 mi (4.30 km)

Major junctions
- South end: US 20 / US 26 / US 87 / WYO 253 in Evansville
- North end: CR 701 northeast of Brookhurst

Location
- Country: United States
- State: Wyoming
- Counties: Natrona

Highway system
- Wyoming State Highway System; Interstate; US; State
← WYO 255	→ WYO 257

Wyoming Highway 256 (WYO 256), Cole Creek Road, is a 2.67-mile (4.30 km) state highway in Natrona County, Wyoming, United States, that connects U.S. Route 20 / U.S. Route 26 / U.S. Route 87 (US 20 / US 26 / US 87) and Wyoming Highway 253 (WYO 253) with Natrona County Road 701 (CR 701), northeast of Brookhurst.

== Route description ==
WYO 256 begins at an intersection with US 20 / US 26 / US 87 (East Yellowstone Highway / Old Glenrock Highway) and the northern terminus of WYO 253 (Hat Six Road) in Evansville. WYO 256 travels north for 2.67 miles (4.30 km) northeast towards the mining areas north of the Ednass Kimball Wilkins State Park which is located on US 20 / US 26 / US 87. The designation of WYO 256 ends and the roadway continues as Cole Creek Road (SR 701).

== Major intersections ==
The entire route is in Natrona County.

Location	mi	km	Destinations	Notes
Evansville	0.00	0.00	WYO 253 south (Hat Six Rd) – I‑25	Continuation south from southern terminus
Evansville	0.00	0.00	US 20 east / US 26 east / US 87 north (East Yellowstone Hwy / Old Glenrock Hwy) – Glenrock US 20 west / US 26 west / US 87 south (East Yellowstone Hwy / Old Glenrock Hwy) – Casper	Southern terminus
	2.67	4.30	CR 701 (Cole Creek Road)	Northern terminus; WYO 256 becomes CR 701
1.000 mi = 1.609 km; 1.000 km = 0.621 mi: Route transition

== See also ==
- List of state highways in Wyoming
