= Casper Mountain =

Mountain in Wyoming, United States

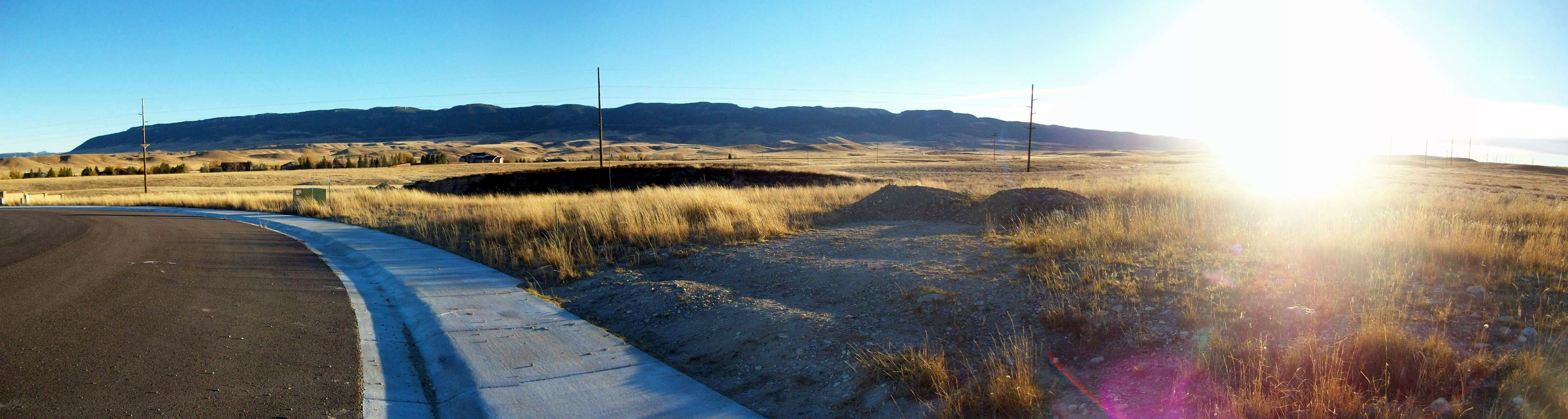
- Casper Mountain, from the east side of Casper, Wyoming.

Highest point
- Elevation: 8,130 ft (2,480 m)
- Coordinates: 42°45′09″N 106°18′52″W

Geography
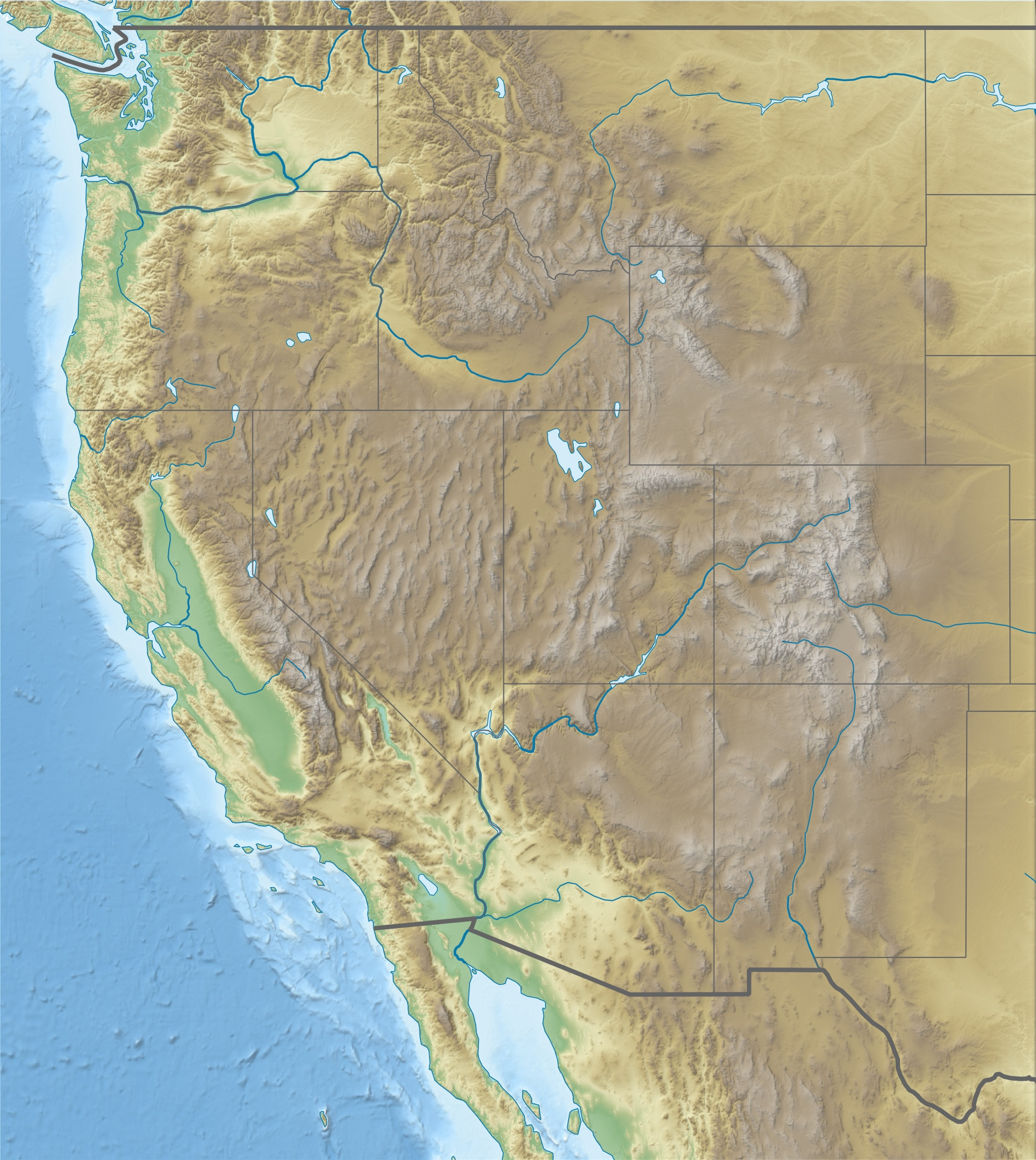
- Location within USA West
- Location: Natrona County, Wyoming, USA
- Parent range: Laramie Mountains
- Topo map(s): USGS Goose Egg, Casper, Brookhurst, Freeland, Crimson Dawn, Otter Creek

Climbing
- Easiest route: Hiking, on roads

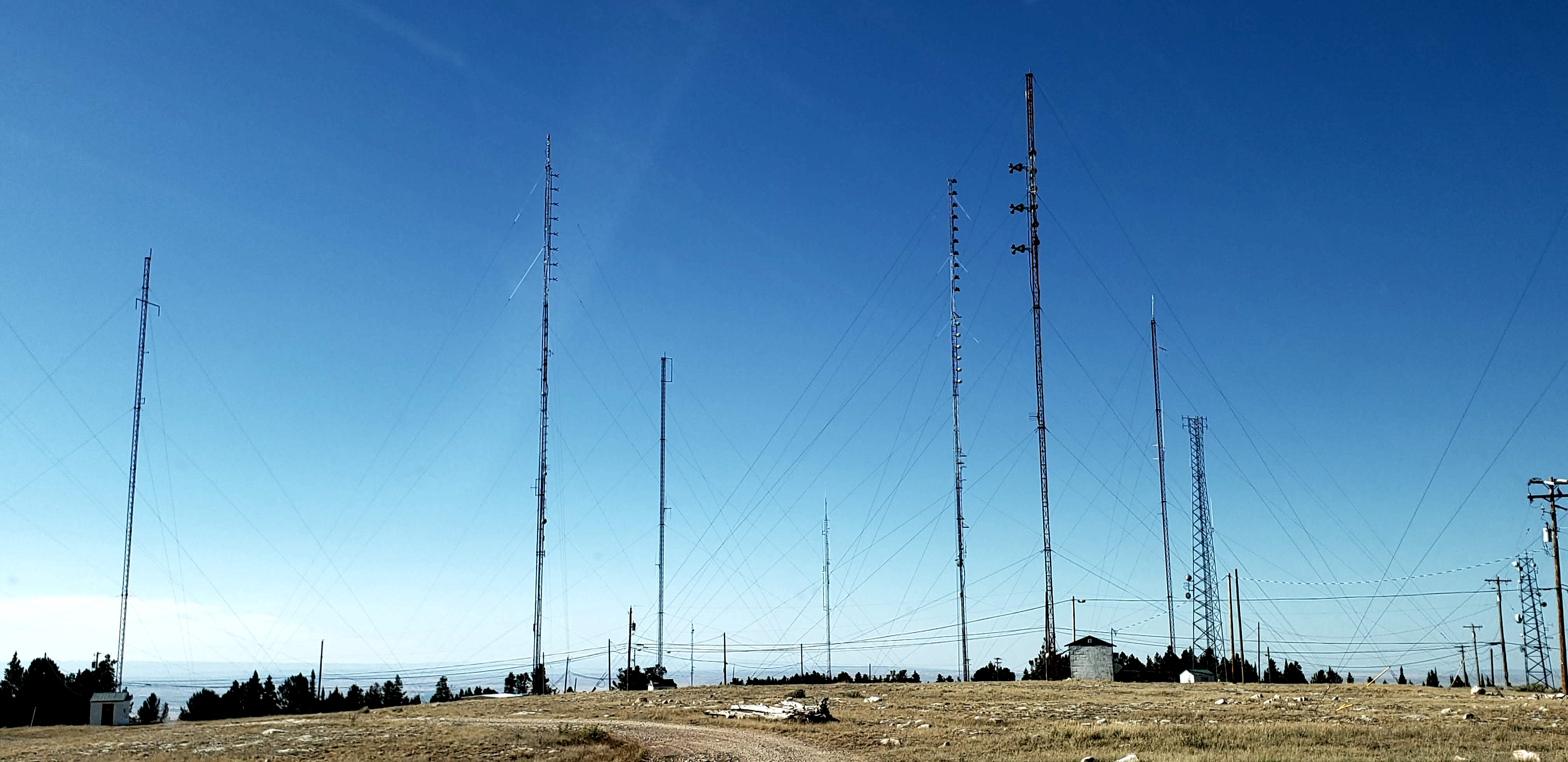
The tower farm on Casper Mountain, Wyoming.

Casper, as seen from the summit of the mountain.

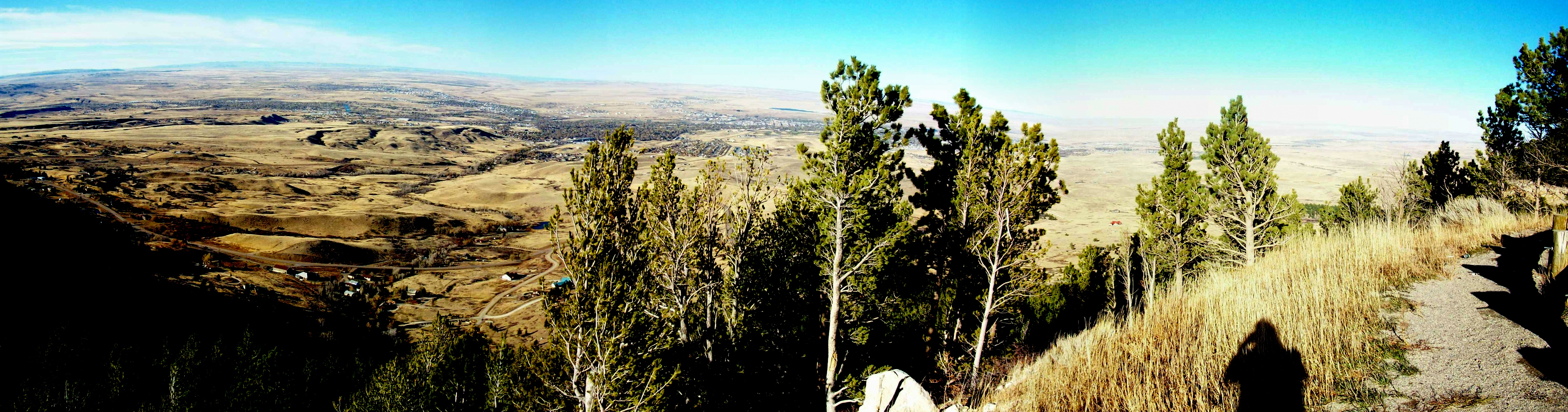
Another view of Casper as seen from Casper Mountain.

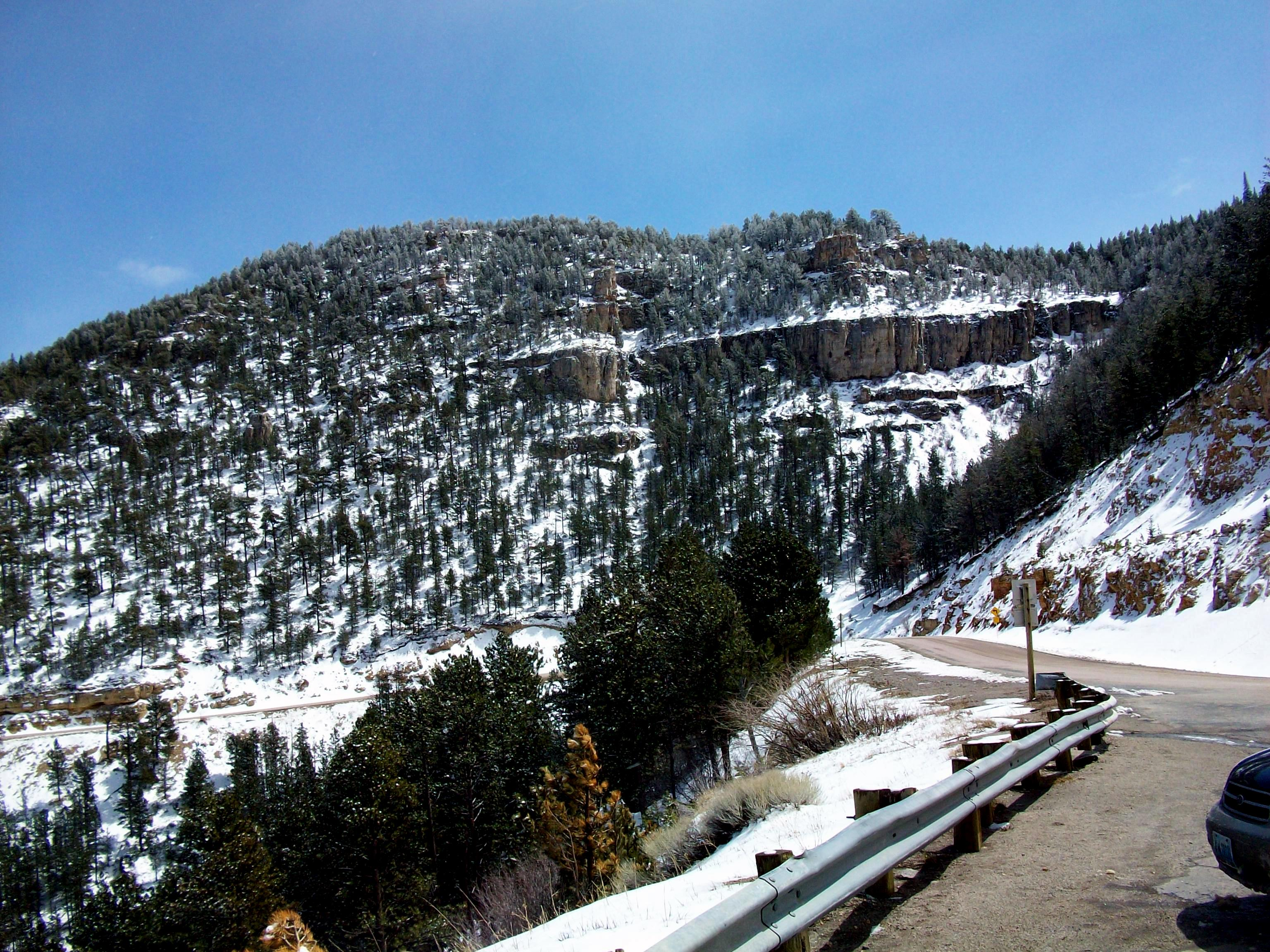
A view of the road (Wyoming Highway 251) climbing the mountain.

Casper Mountain, an anticline, is located at the north end of the Laramie Mountains overlooking Casper, Wyoming along the North Platte River. At a top elevation of 8,130 feet (2,478 m), the geological feature rises approximately 3,000 feet (914 m) above Casper.

== Geology ==
Casper Mountain is composed of precambrian, paleozoic, and mesozoic rocks. The topography of the mountain has remained the same since the Laramide time period. However, erosion has stripped away the top sedimentary soil, exposing older rocks. Casper Mountain features quartzite, biotite schist, gneiss as well as amphibolite. The Casper Mountain fault line lies on the north side. The rocks on Casper Mountain are significantly older than those found in the city of Casper, predominantly because of the anticline nature of the mountain. Archeologists studying the mountain believe Native Americans were in the area around 11,000 years ago. Stone artifacts found on the mountain date to between 4500 and 2500 B.C.. Campsites of these natives were found near quartzite outcroppings, and it is believed they used this rock for tools, arrowheads, knives, and other items. Casper Mountain has an archeological site operated by the University of Wyoming. The mountain is part of the "Casper formation" so named for limestones and sandstones constituting the greater part of the sedimentary rocks in the region, including the Laramie Mountains.

== Recreation ==
Casper Mountain is largely privately owned; however, there are several miles of trails for hiking, mountain biking, and horseback riding.

There are many recreation opportunities on the mountain. Hogadon Ski Area is one of very few ski areas with a parking/entry point located above the resort. Although small, the ski area provides a large source of winter entertainment on the mountain. Other winter activities include cross country skiing, snowshoeing, fatbiking, and snowmobiling. A small part of the cross country ski trails are lit at night, providing night skiing.

The southern side of the mountain is bordered by Muddy Mountain, which itself has many recreation opportunities.

Summer activities on Casper Mountain include camping, hiking, mountain biking, horseback riding, and picnicking. The Braille Trail is a short scenic hike meant for those who are blind, but catering to everyone. The trail celebrated its 35th anniversary in 2010, and was visited by about 2,000 people. The area around the trail has picnic sites, and is popular during the summer. The trail is accessible on a road near the base of Tower Hill. Along with the Braille Trail, Casper Mountain has many other hiking trails. At the base of the mountain's north side lies Garden Creek Falls. The Casper Rotary Club manages the trails around the area and, beginning in December 2010, started to renovate some of the trails in order to make them safer for hikers. The club planned to install low intensity lighting in the parking lot, powered by solar panels. Given concerns by residents near the parking lot, the project was discontinued.

The mountain is also host to an annual summer-solstice gathering at Crimson Dawn. This event, based upon children's stories told by a local woman to her children in the 1930s and 1940s, has grown into a local tradition, with hundreds of families migrating up the mountain to see actors re-enact tales of witches and warlocks.

Casper Mountain is also home to Beartrap Meadow, a large open space at the base of the road leading to the far east side of the mountain. Large parties have and continue to be held in the meadow. Beartrap Meadow also houses several campsites. Since 1994 Beartrap Meadow has hosted the Beartrap Summer Festival in late July or early August. It features bluegrass music and has included bands such as Ricky Skaggs, Earl Scruggs, and the Nitty Gritty Dirt Band.

== Wildlife ==
Wildlife on the mountain includes wild grouse, mule deer, and elk, among other species native to Wyoming. Mountain lions have also been spotted on the mountain. On the west flank of the mountain in Jackson canyon, one of the largest migratory populations of bald eagles in the world take shelter during certain times of year.

== Climate ==
Climate data for Casper Mountain, Wyoming
Month	Jan	Feb	Mar	Apr	May	Jun	Jul	Aug	Sep	Oct	Nov	Dec	Year
Mean daily maximum °F (°C)	28 (−2)	30 (−1)	39 (4)	45 (7)	54 (12)	65 (18)	74 (23)	72 (22)	62 (17)	47 (8)	34 (1)	25 (−4)	48 (9)
Mean daily minimum °F (°C)	13 (−11)	14 (−10)	20 (−7)	25 (−4)	34 (1)	43 (6)	50 (10)	49 (9)	41 (5)	30 (−1)	21 (−6)	13 (−11)	29 (−2)
Average precipitation inches (mm)	1.7 (43)	2.0 (51)	2.8 (71)	3.8 (97)	3.9 (99)	2.1 (53)	1.1 (28)	0.9 (23)	1.7 (43)	2.8 (71)	2.3 (58)	2.0 (51)	27.1 (688)
Average precipitation days	8	9	11	12	11	7	4	4	6	9	10	10	101
Source: Google/NOAA

== Broadcasting ==
All of Casper's high powered television stations originate from towers on the mountain, as do a vast majority of the area's FM radio signals. A cross country ski area cuts right through an area known as Tower Hill (see pictures), where many of the towers are located. Local, State and Federal agencies - BLM, Sheriff, Fire, EMS and Casper PD - operate sites on Casper mountain providing both analog and digital support for traditional radio systems as well as the WyoLink statewide trunking system. There are other commercial sites on the mountain as well, providing such services as wireless ISP and cell phones. Local amateur radio operators also take advantage of the mountain. One of the more heavily used amateur repeaters is operated by the Casper Amateur Radio Club - W7VNJ.

== Fires ==
Although the mountain has seen its fair share of fires, in August 2006 a large wildfire known as the Jackson Canyon Fire burned 11,496 acres (40 km^{2}) on the western end of Casper Mountain, In September 2012, the Sheep Herder Complex fire burned 15,887 acres and consumed 37 residences and 23 outbuildings, according to InciWeb. The fire was 100 percent contained by September 16, 2012. The cause of the fire remains unknown, although it has been speculated to be human-caused.

== Popular culture ==
In 2025, Casper Mountain was featured in a two-part season premiere episode of Ghost Adventures, season 30. Several locations on the mountain were featured in the episode including UFO sightings near Garden Creek Falls, and Crimson Dawn. The crew of the show spent six days in and around Casper and contributed about $50,000 to the local economy.
