= Wyoming Highway 487 =

State highway in Carbon and Natrona counties in Wyoming, United States

Wyoming Highway 487
- Shirley Basin Road
- WYO 487 highlighted in red

Route information
- Maintained by WYDOT
- Length: 72.712 mi (117.019 km)
- Existed: 1959–present

Major junctions
- South end: US 30 / US 287 in Medicine Bow
- WYO 77; WYO 77
- North end: WYO 220 south-southwest of Bessemer Bend

Location
- Country: United States
- State: Wyoming
- Counties: Carbon, Natrona

Highway system
- Wyoming State Highway System; Interstate; US; State
← WYO 452	→ WYO 514

Wyoming Highway 487 (WYO 487), also known as Shirley Basin Road, is a 72.712-mile (117.019 km) state highway in Carbon and Natrona counties in Wyoming, United States. It connects U.S. Route 30 / U.S. Rotue 287 (US 30 / US 287) in Medicine Bow with Wyoming Highway 220 (WYO 220), south-southwest of Bessemer Bend.

== Route description ==
WYO 487 begins at a T intersection with US 30 / US 287 (Old Lincoln Highway) in Medicine Bow. (US 30 / US 287 heads east toward Rock River and Laramie and west toward Hanna Junction and Rawlins.) From its southern terminus, WYO 487 proceeds north to cross the Medicine Bow River before leaving Medicine Bow. About 4 miles (6.4 km) north of Medicine Bow, WYO 487 crosses the Little Medicine Bow River.

Continuing north for over 12 miles (19 km) more, and passing just east of Battle Mountain (on the east end of the Freezeout Mountains range), WYO 487 connects with the south end of Marshal Road (also known as Little Medicine Road or 32 Mile Road), which heads northeast toward Douglas.

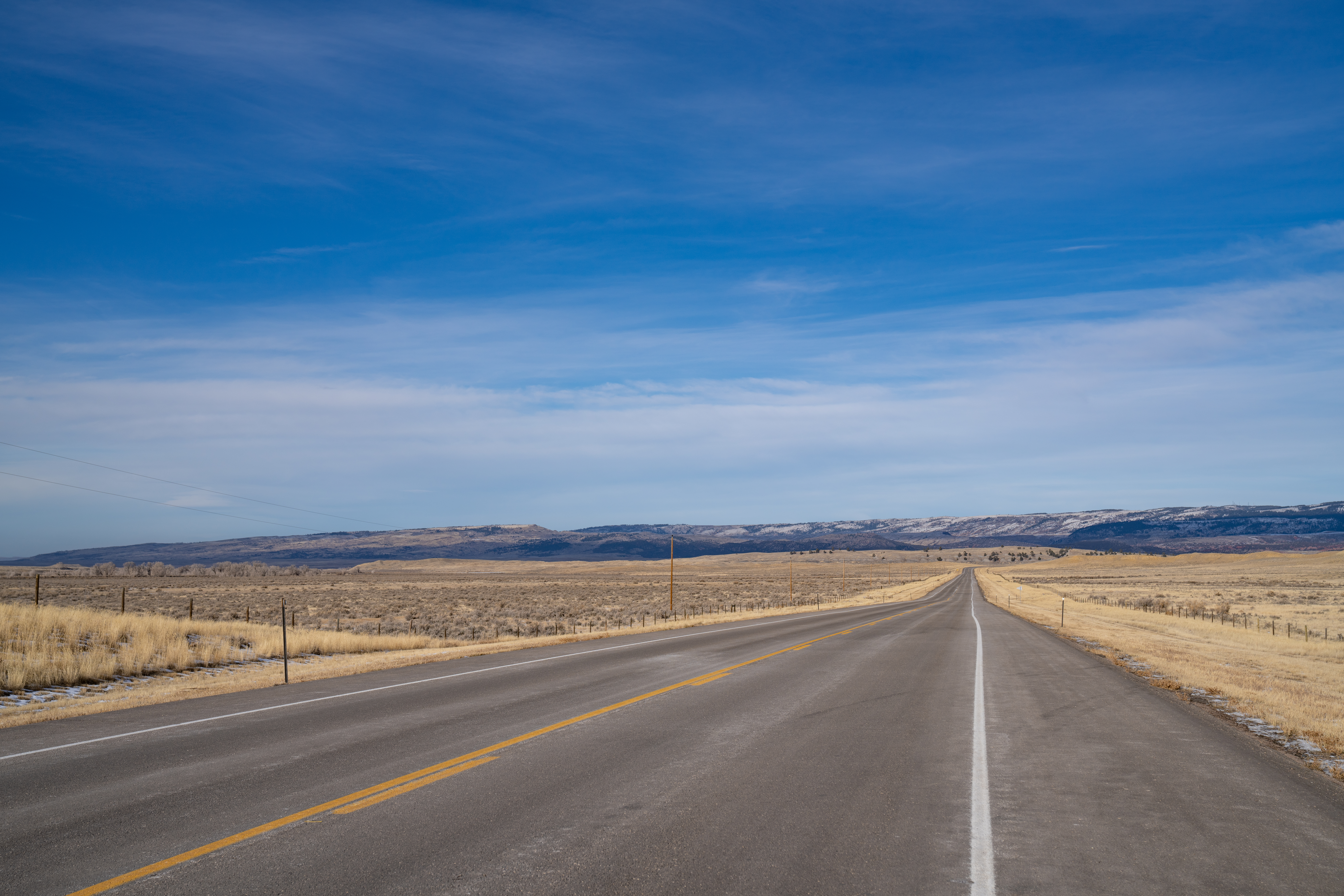
WYO 487 cuts through the plains and mountains between Medicine Bow and Casper, December 2022.

Approximately four and a half miles (7.2 km) farther northwest, WYO 487 connects with the southern end of Wyoming Highway 77 (WYO 77) at a T intersection. (WY 77 heads northwest, then north to form a western loop off of WYO 487.) Roughly 23 miles (37 km) farther north, WYO 487 turns to proceed west-northwest for just over 8 miles (13 km) before reaching the Shirly Basin Rest Area. Just under one mile (1.6 km) later, WYO 487 connects with the north end of WYO 77 at another T intersection.

Beyond the northern end of WYO 77, WYO 487 turns to proceed north again, but after approximately 17.5 miles (28.2 km) it turns west for just over another 9 miles (14 km) before reaching its northern terminus at a T intersection with WYO 220, about 7.3 miles (11.7 km) south-southwest of the census-designated place of Bessemer Bend. (WYO 220 heads east toward Casper and west toward Alcova and Muddy Gap Junction.)

== History ==
The Medicine Bow–Casper Cutoff was designated as Highway 487 by the Wyoming Highway Commission in March 1959.

== Major intersections ==
County	Location	mi	km	Destinations	Notes
Carbon	Medicine Bow	0.000	0.000	US 30 / US 287 (Lincoln Highway) – Laramie, Rawlins	Southern terminus; T intersection
Carbon	Medicine Bow	0.812	1.307	Bridge over the Medicine Bow River	
Carbon		4.013	6.458	Bridge over the Little Medicine Bow River	
Carbon		17.563	28.265	Marshal Rd (Little Medicine Rd / 32 Mile Rd) east – Douglas	T intersection
Carbon		22.162	35.666	WYO 77 north	WYO 77 southern terminus
Carbon		45.100	72.581	Shirley Basin Rest Area	
Carbon		46.025	74.070	WYO 77 south	WYO 77 northern terminus
Natrona		72.712	117.019	WYO 220 – Alcova, Muddy Gap Junction, Casper	Northern terminus; T intersection
1.000 mi = 1.609 km; 1.000 km = 0.621 mi

== See also ==
- List of state highways in Wyoming
