= Wyoming Highway 220 =

State highway in Wyoming, United States

Wyoming Highway 220
- Alcova Highway
- WYO 220 highlighted in red

Route information
- Maintained by WYDOT, City of Casper
- Length: 72.79 mi (117.14 km)
- Existed: 1938–present

Major junctions
- West end: US 287 / WYO 789 at Muddy Gap Junction
- East end: I-25 / US 20 / US 26 / US 87 in Casper

Location
- Country: United States
- State: Wyoming
- Counties: Carbon, Natrona

Highway system
- Wyoming State Highway System; Interstate; US; State
← WYO 219	→ WYO 221
← US 87	→ US 89

Wyoming Highway 220 (WYO 220) is the principal highway connecting the city of Casper to US 287/WYO 789. WYO 220 lies in northwestern Carbon and southern Natrona counties and along the famous Oregon Trail.

== Route description ==
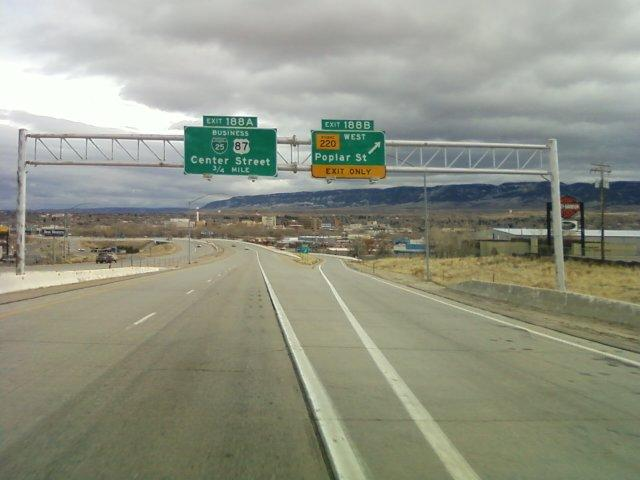
I-25 southbound Exit 188B - WYO 220 in Casper, WY

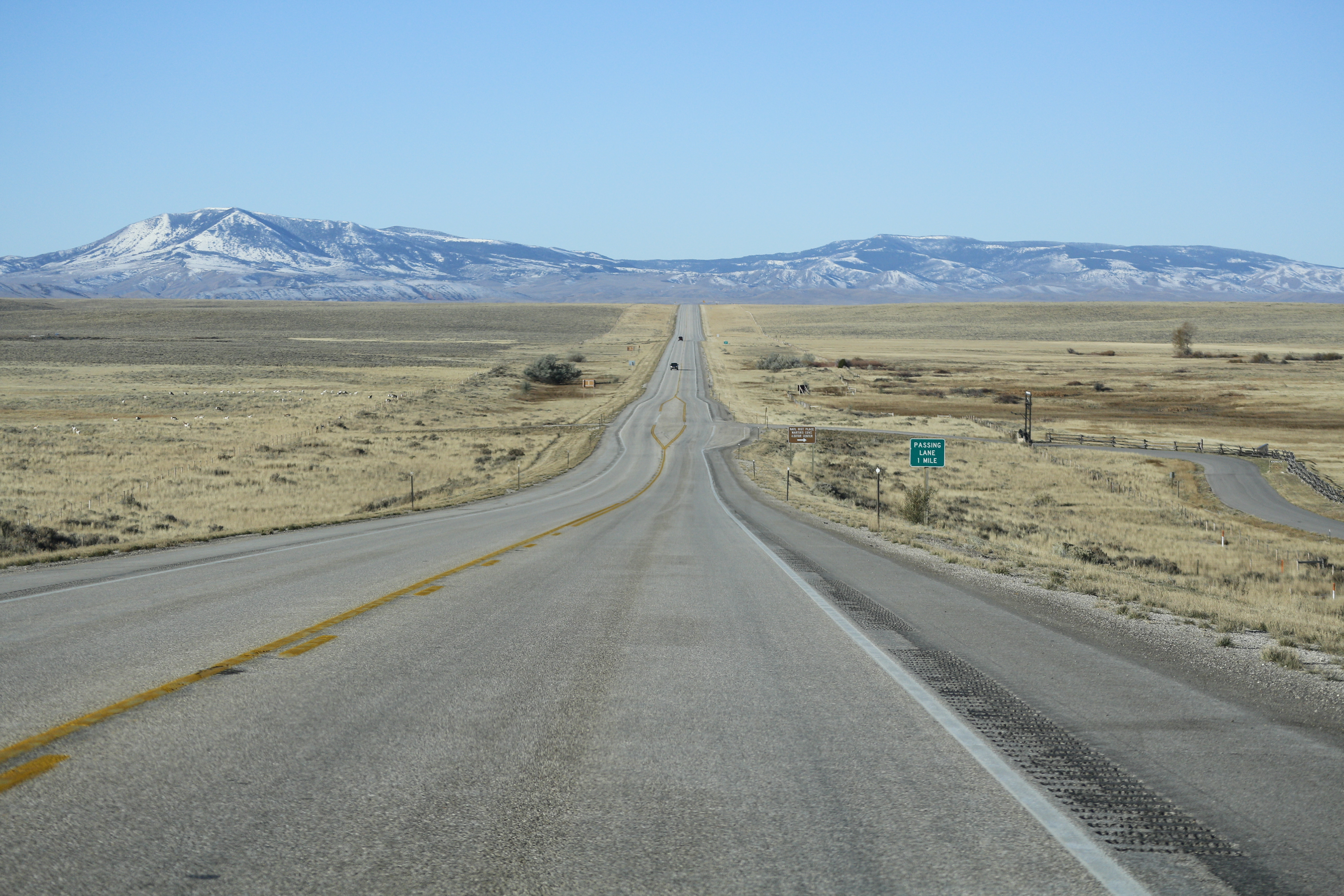
Wyoming Highway 220 near Martin's Cove

Wyoming Highway 220 begins its western end in Carbon County at US 287/WYO 789 at Muddy Gap Junction and from there heads northeast toward Casper. Nearing 20 miles, Highway 220 leaves Carbon County and enters Natrona County as it nears the north side of the Pathfinder Reservoir and the Pathfinder National Wildlife Refuge. It passes Independence Rock, a large granite rock with carvings from mid-19th century emigrants.

WYO 220 passes north of the reservoir, now traveling more easterly as it comes upon the census-designated place (CDP) of Alcova, the center of population of Wyoming. Also to the south lies Alcova Lake. Past Alcova, WYO 220 turns back northeast and begins to parallel the North Platte River and continue until it reaches Casper. At 53.17 miles the northern terminus of Wyoming Highway 487 is intersected as 220 continues northeast. Just before entering the Casper city limits, the two-lane highway becomes a divided multi-lane highway with two lanes for each direction of traffic, and becomes known as CY Avenue. Wyoming Highway 258 (Wyoming Boulevard) is intersected at just over 69 miles. Past WYO 258, the multi-lane division continues until just before the intersection of CY Avenue and Poplar Street. At this intersection, WYO 220 follows Poplar Street north. As WYO 220 heads north on Poplar Avenue, US 20 Business/US 26 Business (First Street) is intersected within a mile and three-quarters of a mile later, WYO 220 reaches its eastern end at Interstate 25 (exit 188B), which also carries US 20/US 26/US 87 as well.

The highway is maintained by WYDOT, except for portions of CY Avenue and Poplar Street in Casper, which are maintained locally.

== History ==
Between 1926 and 1938, what is now WYO 220 was part of U.S. Route 87E (US 87E). In 1938, US 87E's portion in Wyoming was redesignated as WYO 220. The highway generally follows the path of the historic Oregon Trail and has several commemorative markers at various points. WYO 220 originally terminated at US 20 and US 26 in downtown Casper and was later extended north along Center Street to I-25, which was completed in October 1960.

A new "inner-city connector" between WYO 220 and I-29 via Poplar Street was proposed in the 1960s to redirect traffic from downtown. The first phase of the project, a new bridge over the North Platte River and the Chicago, Burlington and Quincy Railroad, opened in late 1968. The full extension of Poplar Street opened on August 14, 1984, following work to relocate a railyard and widening of the street south of the river. WYO 220 was relocated onto the extension, while its old alignment along Center Street became Highway 255.

A portion of the highway in "the Narrows" near Goose Egg was straightened and improved during a 1965 that cost $1.58 million to construct; the project also included preparations to widen the highway to four lanes. Calls to widen WYO 225 grew in the late 1980s after a series of vehicle collisions that killed several people. The state government began work on widening bridges and intersections along the section in 1988, but declined to widen the entire highway.

A western bypass of Casper to relieve congestion on WYO 220 was proposed in the late 1990s and approved for construction in 2000. The route, named Highway 257, opened in December 2015.

== Major intersections ==
County	Location	mi	km	Destinations	Notes
Carbon	Muddy Gap	0.000	0.000	US 287 / WYO 789 / California National Historic Trail / Mormon Pioneer National Historic Trail / Oregon National Historic Trail / Pony Express National Historic Trail / Chief Washakie Trail – Rawlins, Lander	Western terminus; highway continues as US 287/WYO 789 south
Natrona		53.170	85.569	WYO 487 – Medicine Bow	Northern terminus of WYO 487
Natrona		63.915	102.861	WYO 257 (Casper West Belt) to I-25 / US 87 / US 20 / US 26 – Sheridan, Cheyenne, Shoshoni	Southern terminus of WYO 257; opened in December 2015
Natrona	Casper	69.260	111.463	WYO 258 (Wyoming Boulevard)	
Natrona	Casper	72.120	116.066	US 20 Bus. / US 26 Bus. (First Street)	
Natrona	Casper	72.790	117.144	I-25 / US 20 / US 26 / US 87 / California National Historic Trail / Mormon Pioneer National Historic Trail / Oregon National Historic Trail / Pony Express National Historic Trail – Buffalo, Cheyenne, Airport	Eastern terminus; exit 188B on I-25; road continues north as Poplar Street
1.000 mi = 1.609 km; 1.000 km = 0.621 mi

== See also ==
- List of state highways in Wyoming
- List of highways numbered 220
