= Muddy Mountain =

Mountain in Wyoming, United States

Highest point
- Elevation: 8287 ft (2527 m)
- Coordinates: 42°40′55″N 106°16′16″W

Geography
- Location: Natrona County, Wyoming, U.S.
- Parent range: Laramie Mountains

Climbing
- Easiest route: County Road 505

Muddy Mountain is a peak in the Laramie Mountains approximately 12 miles (19 km) south-south-east of Casper, Wyoming. There is a two-mile (3.2 km) "interpretive nature trail" maintained by the Bureau of Land Management, as well as a series of trails popular with mountain bikers, horseback riders, and ATVs in the summer, and snowmobiles in the winter.

In May 2024, the Federal Highway Administration began to improve the access road to the mountain, which was previously a graded dirt road. Natrona County and the Bureau of Land Management assisted with improving the road by paving it and creating more day-use parking. The project included upgrades to Casper Mountain Circle Drive, of which 2.3 miles (4 km) was previously unpaved. On Muddy Mountain itself, 7 miles (11 km) of road was paved. The project is expected to be complete by the fall of 2024.

== Climate ==
The summit of Muddy Mountain has a humid continental climate (Köppen Dfb). However, it could be classified as a subalpine climate (Köppen Dfc), with September only just averaging over 10 °C, making there four months with an average temperature of 10 °C or more. For a climate to be classified as subarctic/subalpine, it must have an average temperature of at least 10 °C for one month but no more than three months, whereas humid continental climates have four or more months. Muddy Mountain is within the 5a USDA Hardiness Zone (-20 °F to -15 °F).

There is no weather station at the summit, but this climate table contains interpolated data for an area around the summit.

Climate data for Muddy Mountain 42.6756 N, 106.2576 W, Elevation: 8,199 ft (2,499 m) (1991–2020 normals)
Month	Jan	Feb	Mar	Apr	May	Jun	Jul	Aug	Sep	Oct	Nov	Dec	Year
Mean daily maximum °F (°C)	26.4 (−3.1)	28.0 (−2.2)	37.2 (2.9)	44.2 (6.8)	53.8 (12.1)	66.1 (18.9)	75.5 (24.2)	73.9 (23.3)	63.7 (17.6)	48.8 (9.3)	35.0 (1.7)	25.9 (−3.4)	48.2 (9.0)
Daily mean °F (°C)	18.9 (−7.3)	19.7 (−6.8)	27.6 (−2.4)	33.7 (0.9)	43.2 (6.2)	54.1 (12.3)	62.9 (17.2)	61.5 (16.4)	52.1 (11.2)	38.9 (3.8)	27.1 (−2.7)	18.8 (−7.3)	38.2 (3.5)
Mean daily minimum °F (°C)	11.4 (−11.4)	11.3 (−11.5)	17.9 (−7.8)	23.3 (−4.8)	32.5 (0.3)	42.0 (5.6)	50.4 (10.2)	49.1 (9.5)	40.5 (4.7)	29.0 (−1.7)	19.2 (−7.1)	11.6 (−11.3)	28.2 (−2.1)
Average precipitation inches (mm)	1.70 (43)	1.87 (47)	2.53 (64)	3.59 (91)	3.98 (101)	2.13 (54)	1.07 (27)	0.98 (25)	1.69 (43)	2.57 (65)	1.84 (47)	1.87 (47)	25.82 (654)
Source: PRISM Climate Group

Bates Creek #2 is a weather station located on the southwestern flank of Muddy Mountain, at an elevation of 6042 ft (1842 m). Bates Creek #2 has a cold semi-arid climate (Köppen BSk), bordering on a humid continental climate (Köppen Dfb).

Climate data for Bates Creek #2, Wyoming, 1991–2020 normals, 1969-2020 records: 6042ft (1842m)
Month	Jan	Feb	Mar	Apr	May	Jun	Jul	Aug	Sep	Oct	Nov	Dec	Year
Record high °F (°C)	60 (16)	62 (17)	74 (23)	79 (26)	88 (31)	97 (36)	98 (37)	98 (37)	98 (37)	84 (29)	71 (22)	63 (17)	98 (37)
Mean maximum °F (°C)	48.8 (9.3)	51.1 (10.6)	63.5 (17.5)	72.4 (22.4)	80.0 (26.7)	87.8 (31.0)	92.5 (33.6)	90.7 (32.6)	86.7 (30.4)	75.8 (24.3)	62.2 (16.8)	51.2 (10.7)	93.4 (34.1)
Mean daily maximum °F (°C)	34.3 (1.3)	35.6 (2.0)	45.9 (7.7)	53.2 (11.8)	63.0 (17.2)	74.8 (23.8)	83.6 (28.7)	82.0 (27.8)	71.8 (22.1)	57.5 (14.2)	44.0 (6.7)	34.4 (1.3)	56.7 (13.7)
Daily mean °F (°C)	23.1 (−4.9)	24.5 (−4.2)	34.2 (1.2)	41.1 (5.1)	50.5 (10.3)	60.7 (15.9)	68.6 (20.3)	67.2 (19.6)	57.6 (14.2)	44.7 (7.1)	32.6 (0.3)	23.7 (−4.6)	44.0 (6.7)
Mean daily minimum °F (°C)	12.0 (−11.1)	13.4 (−10.3)	22.4 (−5.3)	28.9 (−1.7)	37.9 (3.3)	46.6 (8.1)	53.7 (12.1)	52.3 (11.3)	43.4 (6.3)	31.8 (−0.1)	21.3 (−5.9)	13.0 (−10.6)	31.4 (−0.3)
Mean minimum °F (°C)	−7.7 (−22.1)	−6.8 (−21.6)	4.9 (−15.1)	14.8 (−9.6)	25.0 (−3.9)	35.2 (1.8)	44.4 (6.9)	41.9 (5.5)	29.9 (−1.2)	14.0 (−10.0)	2.0 (−16.7)	−6.4 (−21.3)	−14.4 (−25.8)
Record low °F (°C)	−26 (−32)	−29 (−34)	−11 (−24)	−3 (−19)	17 (−8)	29 (−2)	32 (0)	35 (2)	14 (−10)	−8 (−22)	−16 (−27)	−38 (−39)	−38 (−39)
Average precipitation inches (mm)	0.76 (19)	0.76 (19)	0.93 (24)	1.64 (42)	2.28 (58)	1.37 (35)	0.91 (23)	0.76 (19)	1.05 (27)	1.40 (36)	0.65 (17)	0.74 (19)	13.25 (338)
Average snowfall inches (cm)	11.90 (30.2)	11.10 (28.2)	10.50 (26.7)	9.20 (23.4)	2.30 (5.8)	0.10 (0.25)	0.00 (0.00)	0.00 (0.00)	0.60 (1.5)	5.80 (14.7)	5.60 (14.2)	11.90 (30.2)	69 (175.15)
Average extreme snow depth inches (cm)	9.1 (23)	10.1 (26)	7.6 (19)	5.5 (14)	2.3 (5.8)	0.1 (0.25)	0.0 (0.0)	0.0 (0.0)	0.6 (1.5)	5.0 (13)	4.2 (11)	7.8 (20)	14.5 (37)
Average precipitation days (≥ 0.01 in)	6.1	5.8	6.0	8.3	9.1	7.2	5.7	5.0	5.9	5.5	4.8	5.9	75.3
Average snowy days (≥ 0.1 in)	5.4	5.3	4.6	3.4	0.8	0.0	0.0	0.0	0.3	1.9	3.4	5.4	30.5
Source 1: NOAA
Source 2: XMACIS2 (records, monthly max/mins & snow depth)
