= Hogadon Ski Area =

Ski area in Wyoming, United States

Hogadon Basin Ski Area
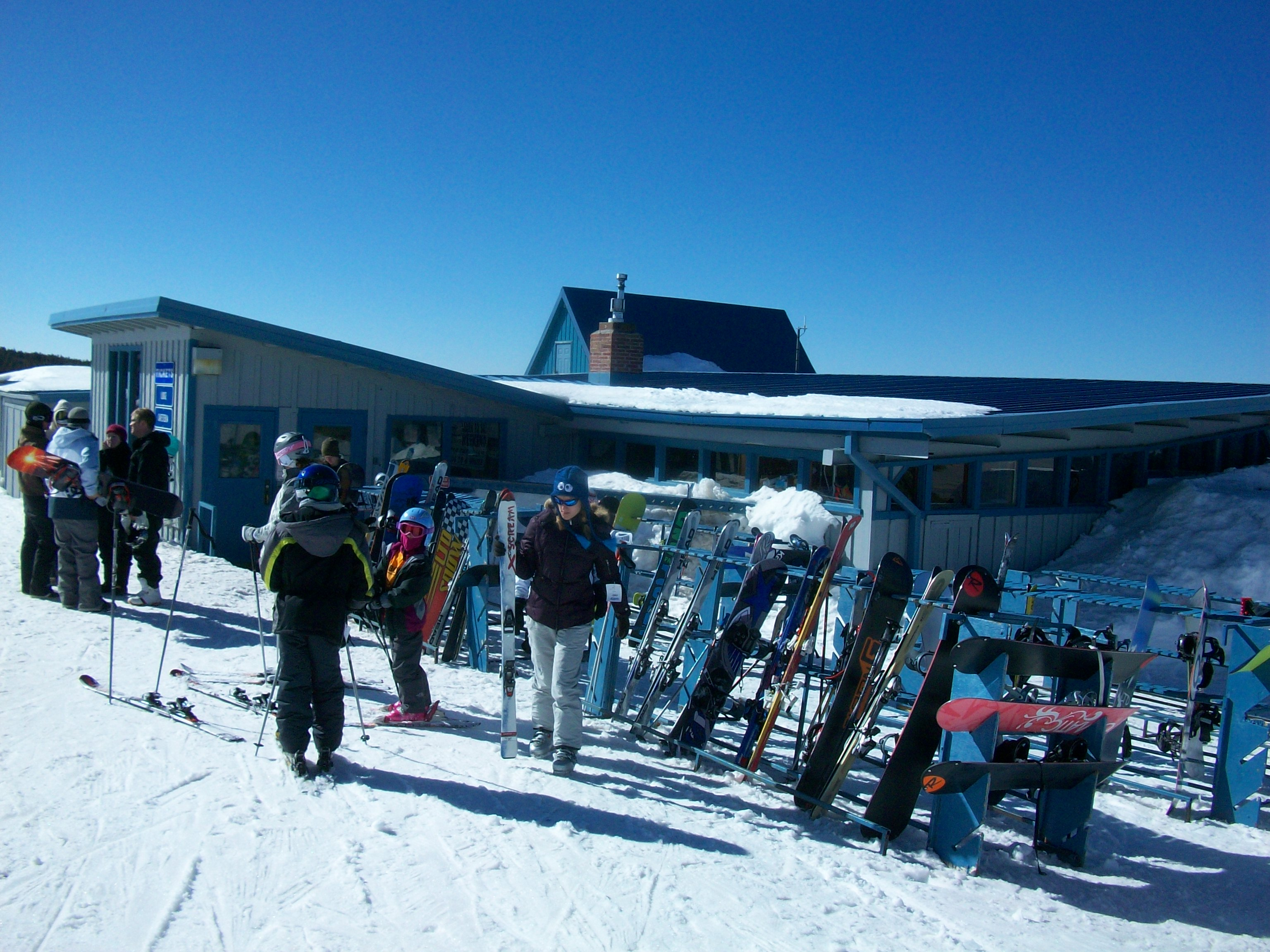

- Location in Wyoming Hogadon Basin Ski Area (the United States)
- Location: Casper Mountain, Natrona County, Wyoming
- Nearest city: Casper, Wyoming
- Coordinates: 42°44′41.86″N 106°20′21.94″W
- Top elevation: 8,000 feet (2,438 m)
- Base elevation: 7,370 feet (2,246 m)
- Skiable area: 60 acres (240,000 m^{2})
- Trails: 27+
- Lift system: 2 lifts
- Terrain parks: 1
- Snowfall: 140"
- Snowmaking: Yes
- Night skiing: Yes (cross country trails - yes)
- Website: http://hogadon.net/

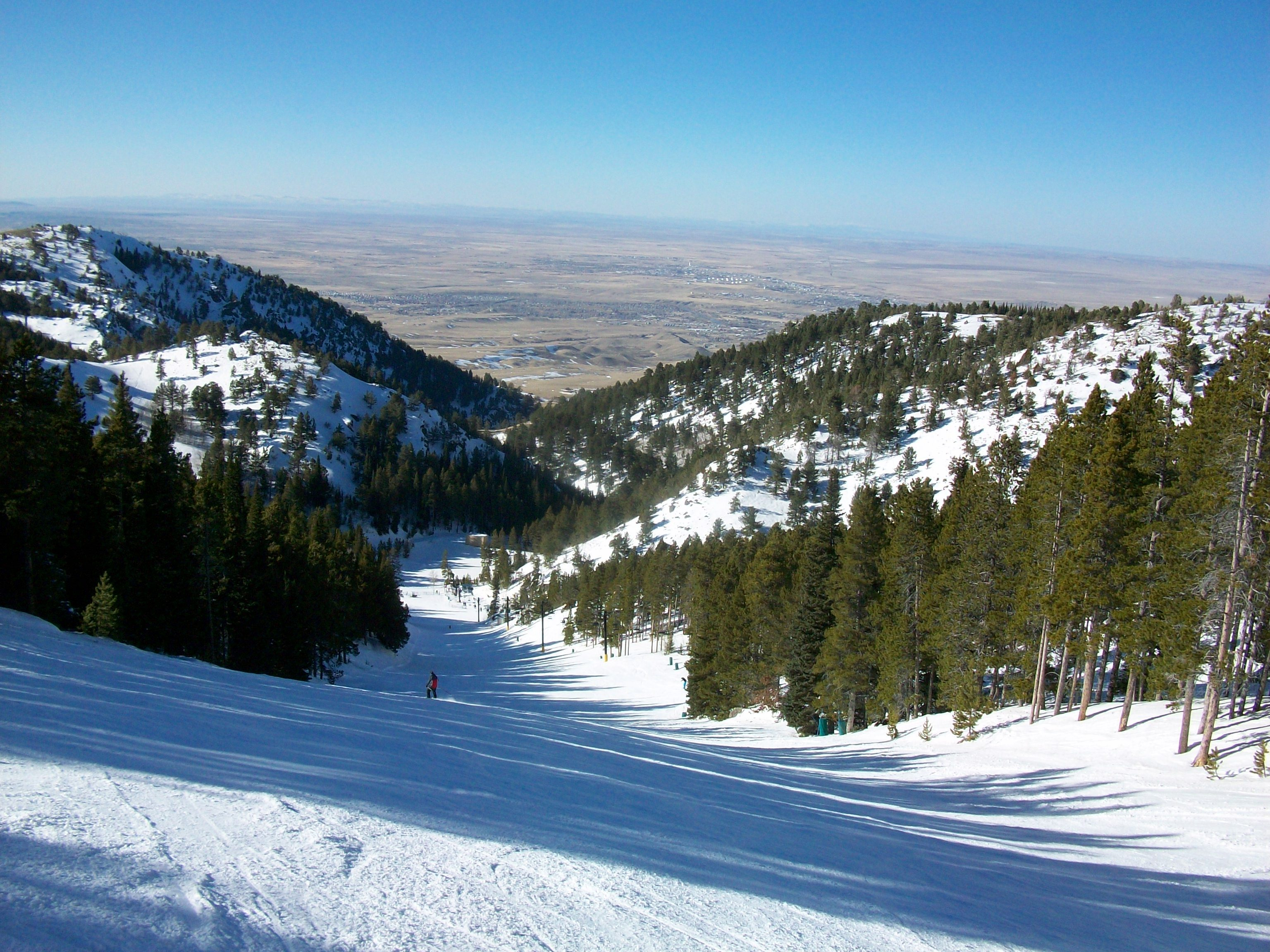
Looking towards Casper, from the top of one of the runs at Hogadon.

Hogadon Basin Ski Area is a ski resort located 11 miles (18 km) south of Casper, Wyoming on Casper Mountain. The mountain features 28 trails of varying difficulty. Of those trails, 20% are beginner, 40% are intermediate and 40% are expert ski terrain. The mountain also features a terrain park. With 600 vertical feet from top to bottom . The ski area offers a restaurant as well. Hogadon is one of the few resorts in the country that has the actual resort building located on the summit as opposed to the base.

The Details:

Elevation: top- 8,000 feet; vertical rise- 600 feet

The Prospector Chair (Double Chair Lift): 2,200 feet long; 1,000 skiers per hour

The Mine Shaft (Magic Carpet Lift): on beginner terrain

60 acres of groomed slopes

50% snowmaking capacity

== Cross country skiing ==
Along with traditional downhill skiing, the mountain also features several miles of cross country trails, minutes from the actual resort itself. These trails are often lit at night for night skiing. As of 2022 The ski resort offers "night" downhill skiing on 2 runs.
