= Casper Mountain, Wyoming =

- CDP
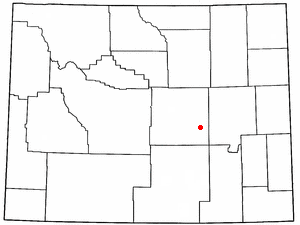
- Location of Casper Mountain, Wyoming
- Coordinates: 42°43′59″N 106°19′36″W
- Country: United States
- State: Wyoming
- County: Natrona

Area
  - Total: 10.4 sq mi (27.0 km^{2})
  - Land: 10.4 sq mi (27.0 km^{2})
  - Water: 0 sq mi (0.0 km^{2})
- Elevation: 7,963 ft (2,427 m)

Population (2010)
  - Total: 401
  - Density: 38.5/sq mi (14.9/km^{2})
- Time zone: UTC-7 (Mountain (MST))
  - Summer (DST): UTC-6 (MDT)
- Area code: 307
- FIPS code: 56-13222
- GNIS feature ID: 1853199

Casper Mountain is a census-designated place (CDP) on Casper Mountain in Natrona County, Wyoming, United States. It is part of the Casper, Wyoming Metropolitan Statistical Area. The population was 401 at the 2010 census.

== Geography ==
According to the United States Census Bureau, the CDP has a total area of 10.4 square miles (27.0 km^{2}), all land.

== Demographics ==
As of the census of 2000, there were 298 people, 126 households, and 97 families residing in the CDP. The population density was 28.6 people per square mile (11.0/km^{2}). There were 303 housing units at an average density of 29.1/sq mi (11.2/km^{2}). The racial makeup of the CDP was 96.31% White, 1.68% Native American, 0.34% from other races, and 1.68% from two or more races. Hispanic or Latino of any race were 2.01% of the population.

There were 126 households, out of which 28.6% had children under the age of 18 living with them, 72.2% were married couples living together, 1.6% had a female householder with no husband present, and 23.0% were non-families. 18.3% of all households were made up of individuals, and 4.8% had someone living alone who was 65 years of age or older. The average household size was 2.37 and the average family size was 2.71.

In the CDP, the population was spread out, with 20.8% under the age of 18, 4.7% from 18 to 24, 25.2% from 25 to 44, 39.9% from 45 to 64, and 9.4% who were 65 years of age or older. The median age was 45 years. For every 100 females, there were 117.5 males. For every 100 females age 18 and over, there were 108.8 males.

The median income for a household in the CDP was $65,795, and the median income for a family was $67,273. Males had a median income of $51,705 versus $30,104 for females. The per capita income for the CDP was $35,866. None of the families and 4.7% of the population were living below the poverty line.
