= Red Butte, Wyoming =

- CDP
- Location within the state of Wyoming
- Coordinates: 42°48′18″N 106°26′03″W
- Country: United States
- State: Wyoming
- County: Natrona

Area
  - Total: 0.47 sq mi (1.2 km^{2})
  - Land: 0.43 sq mi (1.1 km^{2})
  - Water: 0.03 sq mi (0.078 km^{2})
- Elevation: 5,167 ft (1,575 m)

Population (2010)
  - Total: 449
  - Density: 1,000/sq mi (400/km^{2})
- Time zone: UTC-7 (Mountain (MST))
  - Summer (DST): UTC-6 (MDT)
- Area code: 307
- FIPS code: 56-64400
- GNIS feature ID: 2409148

Red Butte is a census-designated place (CDP) in Natrona County, Wyoming, United States. It is part of the Casper, Wyoming Metropolitan Statistical Area. The population was 1,430 at the 2020 census.

== Geography ==
According to the United States Census Bureau, the CDP has a total area of 0.5 square mile (1.2 km^{2}), of which 0.43 square mile (1.1 km^{2}) is land and 0.03 square mile (0.1 km^{2}) (7.06%) is water.

== Demographics ==
As of the census of 2000, there were 439 people, 160 households, and 134 families residing in the CDP. The population density was 941.0 people per square mile (360.6/km^{2}). There were 163 housing units at an average density of 349.4/sq mi (133.9/km^{2}). The racial makeup of the CDP was 96.81% White, 0.23% Native American, 0.46% Asian, 0.68% from other races, and 1.82% from two or more races. Hispanic or Latino of any race were 1.82% of the population.

There were 160 households, out of which 36.3% had children under the age of 18 living with them, 75.6% were married couples living together, 3.8% had a female householder with no husband present, and 16.3% were non-families. 13.1% of all households were made up of individuals, and 6.3% had someone living alone who was 65 years of age or older. The average household size was 2.74 and the average family size was 3.01.

In the CDP, the population was spread out, with 26.9% under the age of 18, 4.8% from 18 to 24, 24.1% from 25 to 44, 31.9% from 45 to 64, and 12.3% who were 65 years of age or older. The median age was 43 years. For every 100 females, there were 111.1 males. For every 100 females age 18 and over, there were 108.4 males.

The median income for a household in the CDP was $70,350, and the median income for a family was $71,500. Males had a median income of $36,500 versus $32,321 for females. The per capita income for the CDP was $26,751. None of the population or families were below the poverty line.
