= InciWeb =

Interagency all-risk information system

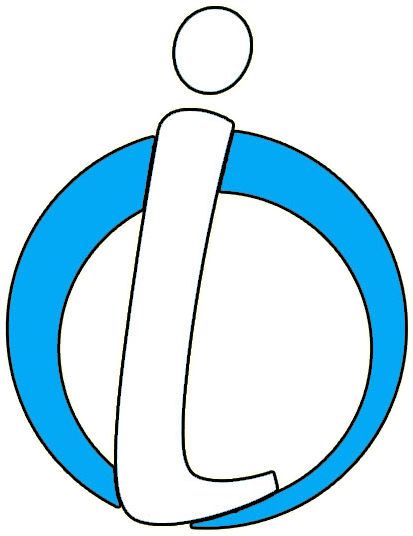
- Company type: all-risk incident web information management system
- Area served: United States
- Industry: web information management system
- Website: inciweb.wildfire.gov
- Launched: 2004

InciWeb is an interagency all-risk incident web information management system provided by the United States Forest Service released in 2004. It was originally developed for wildland fire emergencies, but can be also used for other emergency incidents (natural disasters, such as earthquakes, floods, hurricanes, and tornadoes).

== Introduction ==
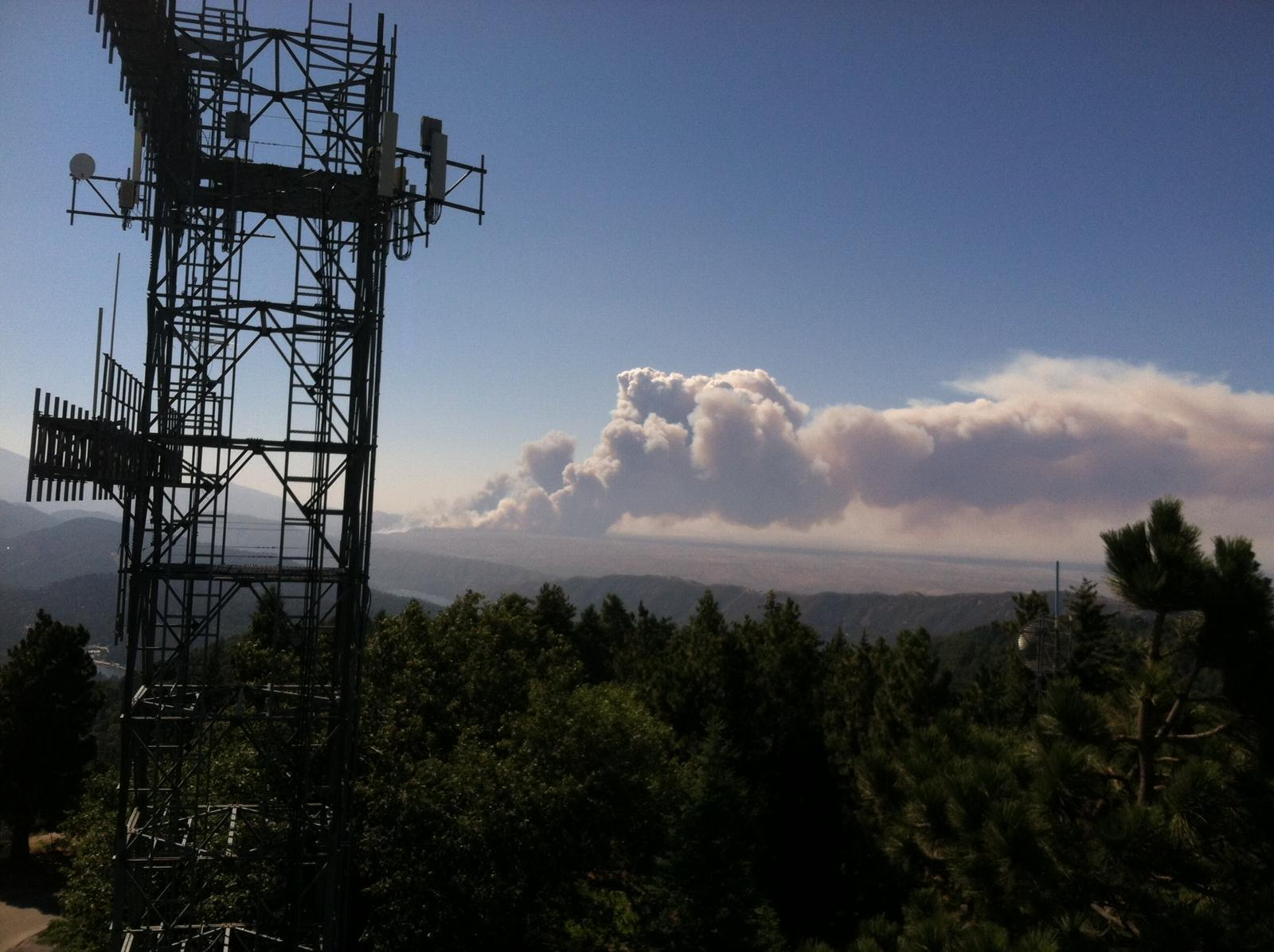
InciWeb photo of the 2015 North Fire in California

It was developed with two primary missions:

1. Provide the public a single source of incident related information
2. Provide a standardized reporting tool for the Public Affairs community

Official announcements include evacuations, road closures, news releases, maps, photographs, and basic info and current situation about the incident.

Incident information can be accessed by:

- web browser at https://inciweb.wildfire.gov/
- Twitter
- RSS web feed

== Technical ==
The original application was hosted at the United States Forest Service - Wildland Fire Training and Conference Center, at McClellan Airfield, California, comprising three servers:

- Database server
- Administrative server
- Load balancer for the public content which routes traffic to a pool of eight servers.

Web traffic averages 2 million plus hits daily during the fire season with the ability to handle 3.5 million hits.

The servers were moved to the National information Technology Center (NITC), Kansas City, Missouri on July 16, 2008, along with the release of version 2.0; the current version is 2.2.

== Availability issues ==
InciWeb was having technical difficulties due to the high volume of Internet users trying to access the site during the September–October 2006 Day Fire and the Summer 2008 California wildfires.

== Participating agencies ==
- United States Forest Service
- Bureau of Land Management
- Bureau of Indian Affairs
- Fish and Wildlife Service
- National Park Service
- National Oceanic & Atmospheric Administration
- Department of the Interior Office of Aircraft Services
- National Association of State Foresters
- United States Fire Administration

These same agencies are also in the National Interagency Fire Center.

== See also ==
- Incident Command System
- Incident management
