= Alcova, Wyoming =

- CDP
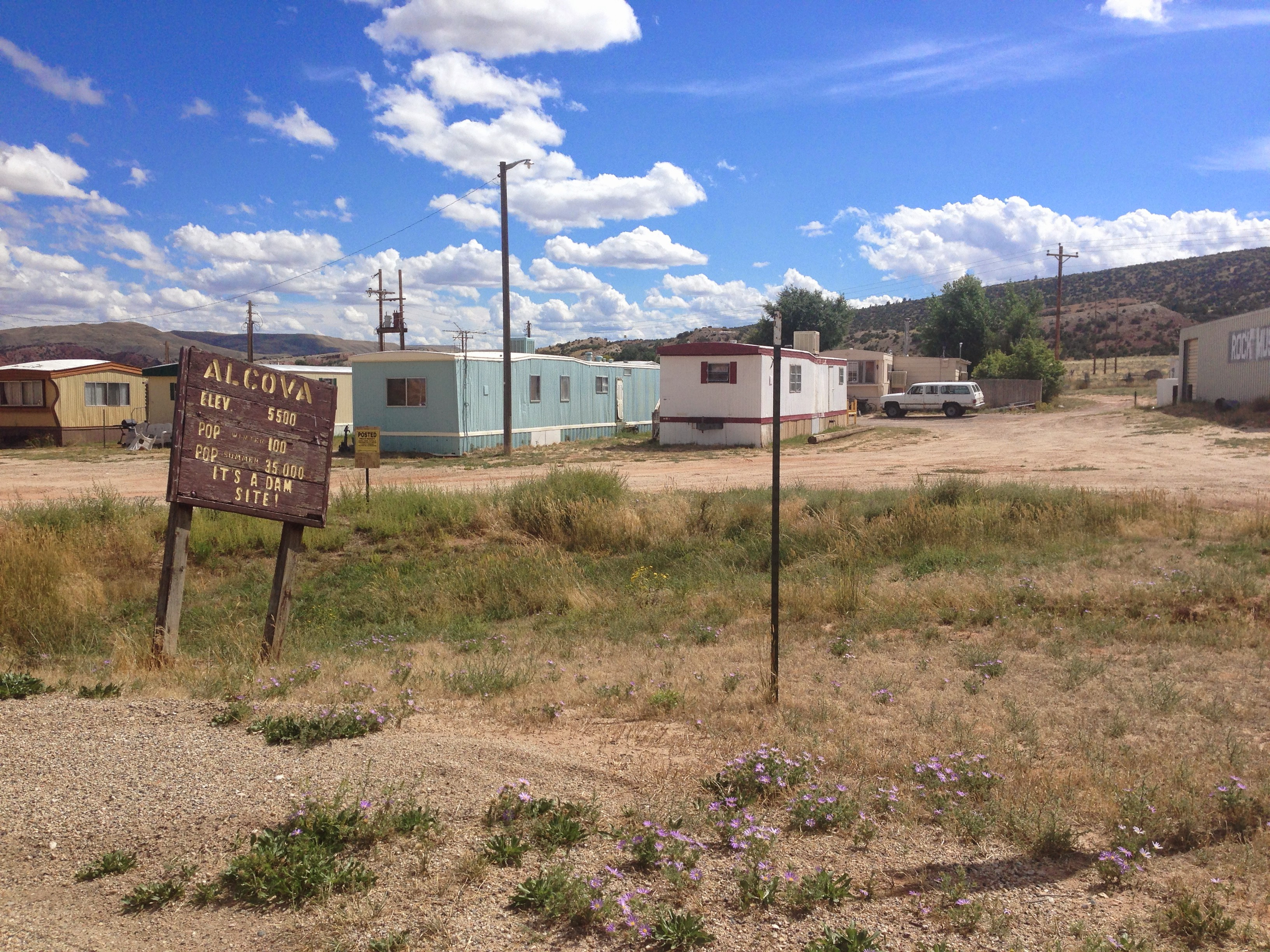
- View of Alcova

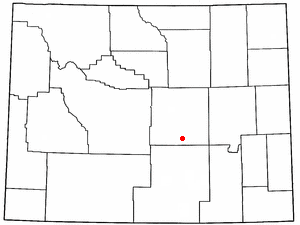
- Location of Alcova, Wyoming
- Coordinates: 42°33′16″N 106°43′35″W
- Country: United States
- State: Wyoming
- County: Natrona

Area
  - Total: 1.25 sq mi (3.2 km^{2})
  - Land: 1.2 sq mi (3.1 km^{2})
  - Water: 0.04 sq mi (0.10 km^{2})
- Elevation: 5,371 ft (1,637 m)

Population (2020)
  - Total: 34
  - Density: 28/sq mi (11/km^{2})
- Time zone: UTC-7 (Mountain (MST))
  - Summer (DST): UTC-6 (MDT)
- ZIP code: 82620
- Area code: 307
- FIPS code: 56-01115
- GNIS feature ID: 2407712

Alcova is a census-designated place (CDP) in Natrona County, Wyoming, United States. It is part of the Casper, Wyoming Metropolitan Statistical Area. The population was 34 at the 2020 census. Wyoming's center of population is located in the small Town of Alcova.

== Geography ==
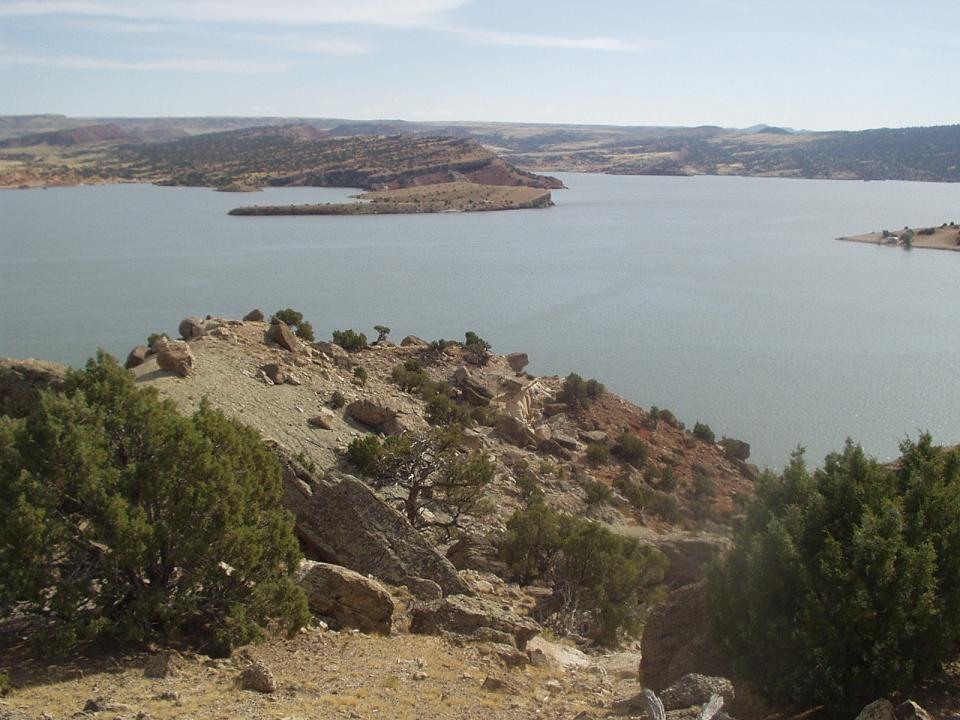
Alcova Reservoir near Alcova, Wyoming

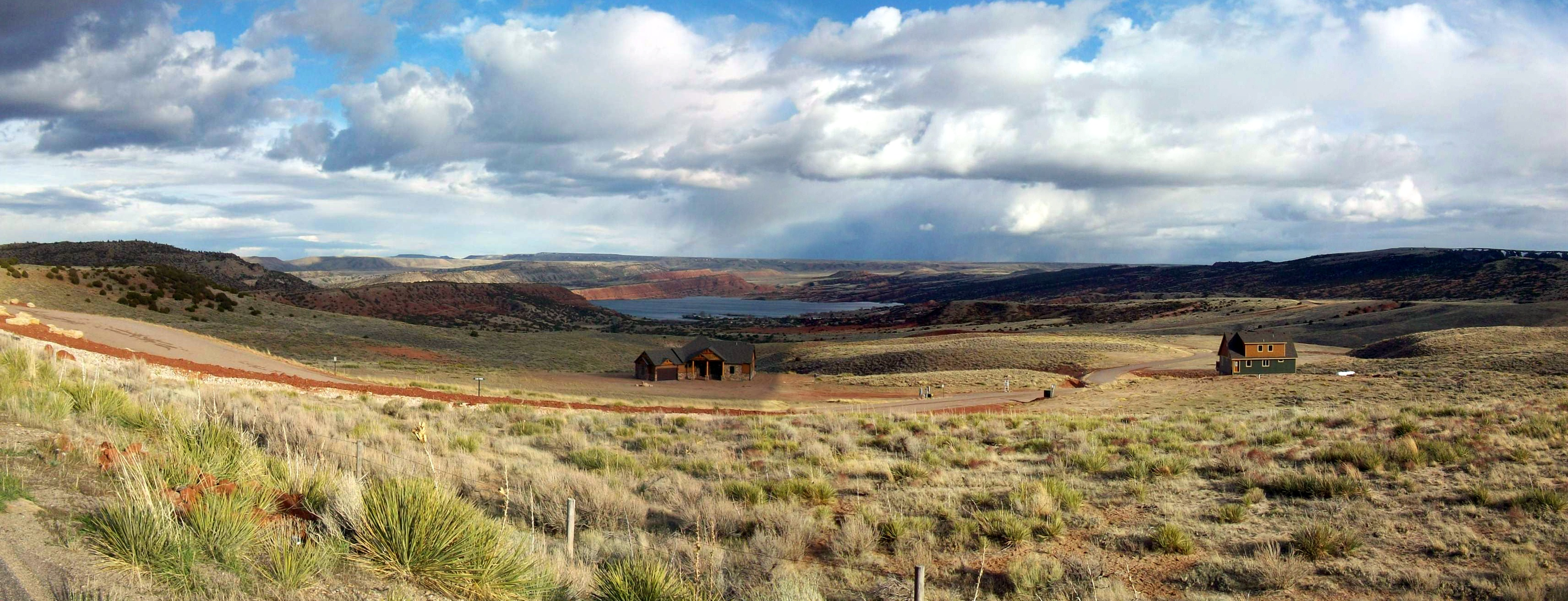
Alcova Reservoir, from Wyoming Highway 220

According to the United States Census Bureau, the CDP has a total area of 1.25 square miles (3.2 km^{2}), of which 1.21 square miles (3.1 km^{2}) was land and 0.04 square miles (0.1 km^{2}) (3.0%) was water.

=== Climate ===
According to the Köppen Climate Classification system, Alcova has a semi-arid climate, abbreviated "BSk" on climate maps.

== Demographics ==
At the 2000 census there were 20 people, 7 households, and 7 families in the CDP. The population density was 70.7 people per square mile (27.6/km^{2}). There were 15 housing units at an average density of 53.0/sq mi (20.7/km^{2}). The racial makeup of the CDP was 90.00% White, 5.00% African American and 5.00% Asian. Of the 7 households 42.9% had children under the age of 18 living with them, 85.7% were married couples living together, and 0.0% were non-families. No households were one person and none had someone living alone who was 65 or older. The average household size was 2.86 and the average family size was 2.86.

The age distribution was 25.0% under the age of 18, 10.0% from 18 to 24, 15.0% from 25 to 44, 30.0% from 45 to 64, and 20.0% 65 or older. The median age was 44 years. For every 100 females, there were 100.0 males. For every 100 females age 18 and over, there were 114.3 males.

The median household income was $102,264 and the median family income was $102,264. Males had a median income of $51,250 versus $0 for females. The per capita income for the CDP was $27,432. None of the population or families were below the poverty line.

== Education ==
There is a small elementary school located in the Town of Alcova called Alcova Elementary School. It is a small rural school with a single classroom.
