= Evansville, Wyoming =

- Town
- Motto: "The People Business"
- Location of Evansville in Natrona County, Wyoming.
- Coordinates: 42°52′16″N 106°15′13″W
- Country: United States
- State: Wyoming
- County: Natrona
- Incorporated: July 1923

Area
  - Total: 3.46 sq mi (8.97 km^{2})
  - Land: 3.46 sq mi (8.97 km^{2})
  - Water: 0 sq mi (0.00 km^{2})
- Elevation: 5,125 ft (1,562 m)

Population (2020)
  - Total: 2,746
  - Density: 855.7/sq mi (330.37/km^{2})
- Time zone: UTC-7 (Mountain (MST))
  - Summer (DST): UTC-6 (MDT)
- ZIP code: 82636
- Area code: 307
- FIPS code: 56-25765
- GNIS feature ID: 2412606
- Website: townofevansville.org

Evansville is a town in Natrona County, Wyoming, United States. It is part of the Casper, Wyoming Metropolitan Statistical Area. The population was 2,746 at the 2020 census.

Evansville is the location of the Oregon Trail State Veterans Cemetery.

== History ==
The town was named after W.T. Evans, a blacksmith.

Evans settled in the area in 1902, and built a successful ranch. From 1918 to 1920, portions of the ranch were sold to the Socony-Mobil and Texas Oil Companies.

The town was incorporated in July 1923.

The Evansville Post Office was established in October 1923. Henry F. Beeman was the first postmaster.

== Geography ==
According to the United States Census Bureau, the town has a total area of 3.58 square miles (9.27 km^{2}), of which 3.54 square miles (9.17 km^{2}) is land and 0.04 square miles (0.10 km^{2}) is water.

== Pollution ==
In 2018, an area of contaminated groundwater that had been classified as a superfund site for three decades was partially removed from the EPA's National Priorities List. Contaminants at the site include benzene and tetrachloroethene. It is believed that the contamination at the Mystery Bridge/U.S. Highway 20 Superfund site was caused by industrial operations at a plant operated by Kinder Morgan and an industrial truck wash operated by Dow Chemical and Dowell-Schlumberger.

== Demographics ==
Historical population
Census	Pop.	Note	%±
1930	174		—
1940	206		18.4%
1950	393		90.8%
1960	678		72.5%
1970	832		22.7%
1980	2,335		180.6%
1990	1,403		−39.9%
2000	2,255		60.7%
2010	2,544		12.8%
2020	2,746		7.9%

=== 2010 census ===
As of the census of 2010, there were 2,544 people, 967 households, and 637 families living in the town. The population density was 718.6 inhabitants per square mile (277.5/km^{2}). There were 1,109 housing units at an average density of 313.3 units per square mile (121.0 units/km^{2}). The racial makeup of the town was 90.8% White, 0.4% African American, 1.7% Native American, 0.4% Asian, 4.1% from other races, and 2.6% from two or more races. Hispanic or Latino of any race were 12.5% of the population.

There were 967 households, of which 40.2% had children under the age of 18 living with them, 41.0% were married couples living together, 16.8% had a female householder with no husband present, 8.2% had a male householder with no wife present, and 34.1% were non-families. 23.5% of all households were made up of individuals, and 6.2% had someone living alone who was 65 years of age or older. The average household size was 2.63 and the average family size was 3.11.

The median age in the town was 29.1 years. 28.9% of residents were under the age of 18; 12.9% were between the ages of 18 and 24; 31.2% were from 25 to 44; 19.9% were from 45 to 64; and 7.3% were 65 years of age or older. The gender makeup of the town was 49.6% male and 50.4% female.

=== 2000 census ===
As of the census of 2000, there were 2,255 people, 848 households, and 561 families living in the town. The population density was 879.7 people per square mile (339.7 people/km^{2}). There were 918 housing units at an average density of 358.1 units per square mile (138.3 units/km^{2}). The racial makeup of the town was 90.07% White, 1.11% African American, 1.24% Native American, 0.22% Asian, 4.43% from other races, and 2.93% from two or more races. Hispanic or Latino of any race were 8.43% of the population.

There were 848 households, out of which 39.2% had children under the age of 18 living with them, 41.3% were married couples living together, 17.9% had a female householder with no husband present, and 33.8% were non-families. 25.8% of all households were made up of individuals, and 6.7% had someone living alone who was 65 years of age or older. The average household size was 2.66 and the average family size was 3.15.

In the town, the population was spread out, with 32.1% under the age of 18, 13.7% from 18 to 24, 28.6% from 25 to 44, 18.4% from 45 to 64, and 7.2% who were 65 years of age or older. The median age was 27 years. For every 100 females, there were 90.5 males. For every 100 females age 18 and over, there were 88.9 males.

The median income for a household in the town was $25,375, and the median income for a family was $28,603. Males had a median income of $26,536 versus $17,981 for females. The per capita income for the town was $11,657. About 21.4% of families and 25.9% of the population were below the poverty line, including 35.2% of those under age 18 and 15.4% of those age 65 or over.

== Government ==
Evansville has a mayor and town council. There are four council members.

In November 2025 the council appointed Ernie Blackford as interim mayor. Blackford will serve as interim mayor until November 2026. Candace Machado, elected in 2024, resigned for personal reasons. Previous to the election Machado was appointed interim mayor in February 2024 when mayor Chad Edwards resigned.

== Education ==
Public education in the town of Evansville is provided by Natrona County School District #1.
